= 45th Félix Awards =

2023 Canadian music award ceremony

- Date: November 5, 2023
- Hosted by: Louis-José Houde

Television/radio coverage
- Network: SRC

The 44th Félix Awards were held on November 5, 2023, to honour achievements in Quebec music. The advance event, presenting awards in lower-profile categories, was held on November 1.

Nominees were announced on September 20.

Actor Louis-José Houde, who has been the host of every Félix Award ceremony since 2006, indicated that the 2023 awards would be his last, although he did not rule out returning again in the future.

== Nominees and winners ==
Male Artist of the Year	Female Artist of the Year
Daniel Bélanger; FouKi; Ludovick Bourgeois; Patrice Michaud; Richard Séguin	Alexandra Stréliski; Roxane Bruneau; Lisa LeBlanc; Ginette Reno; Guylaine Tanguay
Group of the Year	Revelation of the Year
Les Cowboys Fringants; 2Frères; Bleu Jeans Bleu; Salebarbes; Les Trois Accords	Kanen; Bibi Club; Calamine; Francis Degrandpré; Jeanick Fournier
Song of the Year	Songwriter of the Year
Salebarbes, "Gin à l'eau salée"; 2Frères, "On a mis d’la lumière"; Daniel Bélanger, "J’entends tout ce qui joue (dans ta tête)"; Roxane Bruneau, "Partout"; Cœur de pirate, "Crépuscule"; Marc Dupré, "Tout l’amour qu’on donne"; Corneille, "Nouveau pouvoir"; Koriass feat. Jay Scott, "Matusalem"; Lisa LeBlanc, "Dans l'jus"; Ariane Roy, "Ce n’est pas de la chance"	Daniel Bélanger; Philippe B; Philippe Brach; Lydia Képinski; Ingrid St-Pierre; Alexandra Stréliski
Indigenous Artist of the Year	Adult Contemporary Album of the Year
Kanen; Kathia Rock; Matiu; Natasha Kanapé; Shauit	Ginette Reno, C'est tout moi; Maude Audet, Il faut partir maintenant; Jeanick Fournier, Vivante; Ingrid St-Pierre, Reines; Les Sœurs Boulay, Échapper à la nuit
Alternative Album of the Year	Anglophone Album of the Year
Philippe Brach, Les gens qu'on aime; Kanen, Mitshuap; Keith Kouna, Métastases; Lydia Képinski, Depuis; Thierry Larose, Sprint!	Matt Holubowski, Like Flowers on a Molten Lawn; Milk & Bone, Chrysalism; Jonathan Roy, Life Distorsions; Les Shirley, More Is More; Zach Zoya, No Love Is Ever Wasted
Bestselling Album of the Year	Classical Album of the Year, Solo or Small Ensemble
Ginette Reno, C’est tout moi; 2Frères, Sous le même toit; Daniel Bélanger, Mercure en mai; Jean-Michel Blais, aubades; Les Cowboys Fringants, En concert avec l’Orchestre Symphonique de Montréal; Les Cowboys Fringants, L’Amérique pleure (bande sonore originale du film); Lisa LeBlanc, Chiac disco; Salebarbes, Gin à l’eau salée; Souldia, Non conventionnel; Alexandra Stréliski, Néo-Romance	Angèle Dubeau, Portrait Alex Baranowki; Caroline Lizotte, Lizotte Plays/Joue Lizotte; Charles-Richard Hamelin and Andrew Wan, Schumann : Les trois sonnates pour violon et piano; Montreal Symphony Orchestra, Mahler : symphonie No. 5; Stéphane Tétreault and Valérie Milot, Transfiguration
Country Album of the Year	Critic's Choice Album of the Year
Francis Degrandpré, Soir de quai; Tom Chicoine, Moteur super sport; Guillaume Lafond, À destination; Phil G. Smith, On est encore là; Véranda, Là-bas	Daniel Bélanger, Mercure en mai; Gab Bouchard, Grafignes; Philippe Brach, Les gens qu’on aime; FouKi, Zayon; Thierry Larose, Sprint!
Folk Album of the Year	Indigenous Language Album of the Year
Richard Séguin, Les liens les lieux; Julie Aubé, Contentement; Philippe B, Nouvelle administration; Matiu, Tipatshimushtunan; Caroline Savoie, Bruits blancs	Shauit, Natukun; Katia Rock, Uapen Nuta / Terre de nos aïeux; Maten, Utenat; Pako, Nanto
Instrumental Album of the Year	Interpretive Album of the Year
Alexandra Stréliski, Néo-romance; De la beauté, Même l’impossible fleurit; Flore Laurentienne, Volume II; Ping Pong Go, Ping Pong Go; Saratoga, Forêts	Les Cowboys Fringants, En concert avec l’Orchestre Symphonique de Montréal (sous la direction du chef Simon Leclerc); Annie Blanchard and Maxime Landry, Jolene and the Gambler; Isabelle Boulay, Les chevaux du plaisir (Boulay chante Bashung); Vincent Vallières, L’entends-tu encore, Vallières?; Various Artists, C’est notre histoire, hommage à Renée Martel
Jazz Album of the Year	Other Language Album of the Year
Galerie, Anomalie; Gentiane MG, Walls Made of Glass; Jacques Kuba Séguin, Parfum No. 1; Lorraine Desmarais Jazz Trio, Street Beat Suite; Rachel Therrien Latin Jazz Project, Mi Hogar	Valaire, Jazz Futon; Julie Doiron and Dany Placard, Julie & Dany; Chloé Sainte-Marie, Maudit silence; Laurie LeBlanc, Long Weekend; Waahli, Soap Box
Pop Album of the Year	Rap Album of the Year
Daniel Bélanger, Mercure en mai; Bleu Jeans Bleu, Top Minou; Clay & Friends, Aguà Extend’eau; Dumas, Cosmologie; Clay Scott, Clay Scott	Loud, Aucune promesse; Calamine, Lesbienne woke sur l’Autotune; FouKi, Zayon; Rymz, Un jour de plus au paradis; Shreez, Je suis canicule
Rock Album of the Year	Traditional Album of the Year
Les Trois Accords, Présencee d'esprit; Gab Bouchard, Grafignes; LUMIÈRE, GLAM; Jonathan Personne, Jonathan Personne; Vulgaires Machins, Disruption	Le Vent du Nord, Les voix du vent avec cordes et piano (Le Quatuor Trad, Philippe Prud’homme); Bon Débarras, Bon Débarras en famille; É.T.É., Sur ces eaux; Le Diable à Cinq, Tempête; Musique à bouches, Il est grand temps
World Music Album of the Year	Anglophone Concert of the Year
Pierre Kwenders, José Louis and the Paradox of Love; Ayrad, III; Ramon Chicharron, Destello de Estrellas; Diogo Ramos, Cabaça; Wesli, Tradisyon	Jonathan Roy, Life Distortions Tour; The Barr Brothers, 23 Winter Tour; Jesse Mac Cormack, SOLO Tour; Alicia Moffet, Intertwine
Comedy Concert of the Year	Francophone Concert of the Year
Adib Alkhalidey, Québécois Tabarnak; Fabien Cloutier, Délicat; Jo Cormier, Animal; Simon Gouache, Live; Christine Morency, Grâce	Michel Rivard, Le tour du bloc; 2Frères, Sous le même toit; Jean-Michel Blais, aubades; Bleu Jeans Bleu, Top Minou; Bon Enfant, Diorama; Lisa LeBlanc, Chiac disco; Hubert Lenoir, Picture de IPSE Tour; Les Louanges, Crash; Jay Scott, Québec World Tour; Richard Séguin, Traverser les saisons
Other Language Concert of the Year	Variety or Reinterpretation Concert of the Year
Clay & Friends, Aguà; Pierre Kwenders, José Louis and the Paradox of Love; Laura Niquay, Waska Mitisiwin; Chloé Sainte-Marie, Maudit silence	Salebarbes, Salebarbes; Annie – The Musical; Harmonium Symphonique; Hedwig et le pouce en furie; Fred Pellerin, La descente aux affaires
Most Successful Artist Outside Quebec	Video of the Year
Alexandra Stréliski; La Zarra; Les Louanges; Lisa LeBlanc; Patrick Watson	Ariane Roy, "Kundah"; Jean-Michel Blais, "La chute"; Dumas, "Leitmotiv"; FouKi, "Zayon"; LOST, "Malsain et sauf"
