= 2017 in Canadian music =

The following is a list of notable events and releases that happened in 2017 in music in Canada.

== Events ==
- April 2 – Juno Awards of 2017
- April – East Coast Music Awards
- May – Prism Prize
- June – Preliminary longlist for the 2017 Polaris Music Prize is announced
- July – SOCAN Songwriting Prize is won by PUP in the English division and Klô Pelgag in the French division.
- July – Shortlist for the Polaris Music Prize is announced
- September – Lido Pimienta wins the Polaris Music Prize for her album La Papessa
- Fall – 13th Canadian Folk Music Awards
- November 6 – Tower of Song: A Memorial Tribute to Leonard Cohen, a memorial tribute concert to singer-songwriter Leonard Cohen to mark the first anniversary of his death, is held at Montreal's Bell Centre

== Bands reunited ==
- Joydrop
- Northern Haze
- Slow

== Albums released ==
=== # ===
- 2Frères, La Route

=== A ===
- Aerialists, Group Manoeuvre
- Afrikana Soul Sister, Afrikana Soul Sister
- The Age of Electric, The Pretty EP – February 17
- Lydia Ainsworth, Darling of the Afterglow – March 31
- Alaskan Tapes, In Distance We're Losing
- a l l i e, Nightshade
- Alvvays, Antisocialites – September 8
- Ammoye, The Light
- Tafari Anthony, Remember When
- Arcade Fire, Everything Now – July 28
- Austra, Future Politics – January 20

=== B ===
- Jason Bajada, Loveshit 2 (Blondie & the Backstabberz)
- Aidan Baker, Aberration – December 8
- Barenaked Ladies, Fake Nudes – November 17
- The Barr Brothers, Queens of the Breakers – October 13
- The Beaches, Late Show – October 20
- Begonia, Lady in Mind
- Beppie, There's a Song Inside Me
- Bernice, Puff EP
- The Besnard Lakes, Are the Divine Wind – February 3
- Beyries, Landing
- Big Brave, Ardor
- The Birthday Massacre, Under Your Spell – June 9
- Philippe Brach, Le silence des troupeaux
- Broken Social Scene, Hug of Thunder – July 7
- Roxane Bruneau, Dysphorie
- Louise Burns, Young Mopes – February 3
- Spencer Burton, Songs Of
- Matthew Byrne, Horizon Lines

=== C ===
- Daniel Caesar, Freudian – August 25
- Steph Cameron, Daybreak Over Jackson Street
- Patricia Cano, Madre Amiga Hermana
- Lou Canon, Suspicious – April 7
- Charlotte Cardin, Main Girl
- Celeigh Cardinal, Everything and Nothing at All
- Casper Skulls, Mercy Works
- Keshia Chanté, Unbound 01 – March 24
- Choses Sauvages, Choses Sauvages
- Ora Cogan, Crickets
- Cold Specks, Fool's Paradise
- Corridor, Supermercado
- The Courtneys, The Courtneys II – February 17
- Rose Cousins, Natural Conclusion – February 3
- Crown Lands, Rise Over Run
- Alex Cuba, Lo Unico Constante – April 7
- Eliana Cuevas, Golpes y Flores
- Amelia Curran, Watershed – March 10

=== D ===
- Danko Jones, Wild Cat – March 3
- Daphni, Joli Mai
- Desirée Dawson, Wild Heart
- The Dears, Times Infinity Volume Two – July 14
- Death From Above, Outrage! Is Now – September 8
- The Deep Dark Woods, Yarrow
- Mac DeMarco, This Old Dog – May 7
- Le Diable à Cinq, Sorti de l'enfer
- Do Make Say Think, Stubborn Persistent Illusions – May 19
- Julie Doiron, Julie Doiron Canta en Español Vol. 2
- Gord Downie, Introduce Yerself – October 27
- Drake, More Life – March 18
- Marc Dupré, La vie qu'il nous reste
- Durham County Poets, Grimshaw Road
- dvsn, Morning After – October 13

=== E ===
- Fred Eaglesmith, Standard
- Earle and Coffin, Wood Wire Blood & Bone (February); A Day in July (September)
- Efajemue, Fragile
- Coral Egan and Karen Young, Dreamers
- Elliott Brood, Ghost Gardens – September 15
- Emily Haines & The Soft Skeleton, Choir of the Mind – September 15
- Quin Etheridge-Pedden, Embark
- André Ethier, Under Grape Leaves

=== F ===
- Fast Romantics, American Love – April 28
- Stephen Fearing, Every Soul's a Sailor
- Feist, Pleasure – April 28
- Janina Fialkowska, Chopin Recital 3 – April 7
- FouKi, Extendo
- FouKi, Pré_Zay
- FouKi, Sour Face Musique
- Freedom Writers, Again
- Fucked Up, Year of the Snake
- Nelly Furtado, The Ride – March 31

=== G ===
- The Garrys, Surf Manitou
- Ghostkeeper, Sheer Blouse Buffalo Knocks – March 31
- The Glorious Sons, Young Beauties and Fools – October 13
- Godspeed You! Black Emperor, Luciferian Towers – September 22
- Matthew Good, Something Like a Storm – October 20
- Jenn Grant, Paradise – March 3
- Great Lake Swimmers, They Don't Make Them Like That Anymore

=== H ===
- Harm & Ease, Wonderful Changes
- Headstones, Little Army – June 2
- Hedley, Cageless – September 29
- Hollerado, Born Yesterday
- Matt Holubowski, Solitudes (Epilogue)
- Nate Husser, Geto Rock for the Youth
- Andrew Hyatt, Iron & Ashes

=== I ===
- Brandon Isaak, Big City Back Country Blues
- Iskwé, The Fight Within
- Ivory Hours, Dreamworld

=== J ===
- Japandroids, Near to the Wild Heart of Life – January 27
- Julie and the Wrong Guys, Julie and the Wrong Guys – September 8

=== K ===
- Kae Sun, Canary – February
- Khotin, New Tab
- Kid Koala, Music to Draw To: Satellite – January 20
- Brett Kissel, We Were That Song
- Keith Kouna, Bonsoir shérif
- Nicholas Krgovich, In an Open Field
- Pierre Kwenders, Makanda at the End of Space, the Beginning of Time

=== L ===
- Land of Talk, Life After Youth – May 19
- Richard Laviolette, Taking the Long Way Home – March 10
- Catherine Leduc, Un bras de distance avec le soleil
- Exco Levi, Narrative – November 24
- Lights, Skin & Earth – September 22
- Loud, Une année record
- Russell Louder, Think of Light
- The Lowest of the Low, Do the Right Now
- Rob Lutes, Walk in the Dark
- The Luyas, Human Voicing – February 24

=== M ===
- Maestro Fresh Wes, Coach Fresh – November 17
- Majid Jordan, The Space Between – October 27
- Mama's Broke, Count the Wicked
- Manila Grey, No Saints Under Palm Shade
- Matiu, Matiu
- Mauno, Tuning
- Matt Mays, Once Upon a Hell of a Time – October 20
- Jon McKiel, Memorial Ten Count
- Patrice Michaud, Almanach
- Danny Michel, Khlebniknov – January 20
- Millimetrik, Sour Mash
- Mother Mother, No Culture – February 10
- David Myles, Real Love – September 15

=== N ===
- The New Pornographers, Whiteout Conditions – April 7
- Nickelback, Feed the Machine – June 9
- Justin Nozuka, High Tide – September 22

=== O ===
- Ocie Elliott, Ocie Elliott
- Oh Susanna, A Girl in Teen City
- Our Lady Peace, Somethingness EP, Vol. 1 – August 25
- Ouri, Superficial

=== P ===
- Partner, In Search of Lost Time – September 8
- PartyNextDoor, Colours 2 – June 2
- PartyNextDoor, Seven Days – September 28
- Peter Peter, Noir Eden – February 24
- Peter Henry Phillips, The Origin
- Dany Placard, Full Face
- Joel Plaskett and Bill Plaskett, Solidarity – February 17
- Chad Price, Chad Price
- Propagandhi, Victory Lap – September 29

=== R ===
- Allan Rayman, Roadhouse 01
- The Real McKenzies, Two Devils Will Talk – March 3
- Alejandra Ribera, This Island – January 27
- Daniel Romano, Modern Pressure
- The Royal Oui, This Is Someday – May 19
- The Rural Alberta Advantage, The Wild
- Ruth B, Safe Heaven – May 5
- Serena Ryder, Utopia

=== S ===
- The Sadies, Northern Passages – February 10
- Julien Sagot, Bleu Jane
- Said the Whale, As Long As Your Eyes Are Wide – March 31
- Saukrates, Season 2 – November 17
- Jay Scøtt x Smitty Bacalley, Stockholm
- Seaway, Vacation – September 15
- Joseph Shabason, Aytche - August 25
- Shauit, Apu Peikussiak^{u}
- Crystal Shawanda, Voodoo Woman
- Vivek Shraya with the Queer Songbook Orchestra, Part Time Woman
- Sister Ray, Untitled
- Silverstein, Dead Reflection – July 14
- Zal Sissokho, Le Palabre
- Sarah Slean, Metaphysics – April 7
- Snotty Nose Rez Kids, Snotty Nose Rez Kids – January; The Average Savage – September
- So Loki, Shine
- Souldia, Ad Vitam Æternam
- Leeroy Stagger, Love Versus – April 7
- Stars, There Is No Love in Fluorescent Light – October 13
- Jeffery Straker, Dirt Road Confessional

=== T ===
- Theory of a Deadman, Wake Up Call – October 27
- Timber Timbre, Sincerely, Future Pollution – April 7
- Tire le coyote, Désherbage
- Maylee Todd, Acts of Love – November 3
- Shania Twain, Shania Now
- Twin Flames, Signal Fire

=== V ===
- Rosie Valland, Synchro
- Chad VanGaalen, Light Information – September 8
- Jennie Vee, Suffer – September 22
- Vile Creature, A Pessimistic Doomsayer
- Leif Vollebekk, Twin Solitude

=== W ===
- Frank Walker, 24
- The Weather Station, The Weather Station - October 6
- Weaves, Wide Open
- Whitehorse, Panther in the Dollhouse – July 7
- Wolf Parade, Cry Cry Cry – October 6
- The Wooden Sky, Swimming in Strange Waters – April 7
- Roy Wood$, Say Less – December 1

=== Y ===
- Neil Young, Hitchhiker – September 8
- Neil Young + Promise of the Real, The Visitor – December 1

== Year-End List ==
| № | Artist(s) | Title |
|---|---|---|
| 1 | Ed Sheeran | "Shape of You" |
| 2 | Justin Bieber and Luis Fonsi featuring Daddy Yankee | "Despacito Remix" |
| 3 | The Chainsmokers featuring Halsey | "Closer" |
| 4 | The Chainsmokers and Coldplay | "Something Just like This" |
| 5 | French Montana featuring Swae Lee | "Unforgettable" |
| 6 | The Weeknd featuring Daft Punk | "Starboy" |
| 7 | Bruno Mars | "That's What I Like" |
| 8 | Kygo and Selena Gomez | "It Ain't Me" |
| 9 | Clean Bandit featuring Sean Paul and Anne-Marie | "Rockabye" |
| 10 | Justin Bieber featuring DJ Khaled, Quavo, Chance the Rapper and Lil Wayne | "I'm the One" |
| 11 | Kendrick Lamar | "Humble" |
| 12 | Imagine Dragons | "Believer" |
| 13 | James Arthur | "Say You Won't Let Go" |
| 14 | Ed Sheeran | "Castle on the Hill" |
| 15 | Future | "Mask Off" |
| 16 | Shawn Mendes | "There's Nothing Holdin' Me Back" |
| 17 | Post Malone featuring Quavo | "Congratulations" |
| 18 | Lil Uzi Vert | "XO Tour Llif3" |
| 19 | DJ Khaled featuring Rihanna and Bryson Tiller | "Wild Thoughts" |
| 20 | Charlie Puth | "Attention" |
| 21 | Sam Hunt | "Body Like a Back Road" |
| 22 | Zedd and Alessia Cara | "Stay" |
| 23 | The Weeknd featuring Daft Punk | "I Feel It Coming" |
| 24 | Zayn and Taylor Swift | "I Don't Wanna Live Forever" |
| 25 | Niall Horan | "Slow Hands" |
| 26 | The Chainsmokers | "Paris" |
| 27 | Bruno Mars | "24K Magic" |
| 28 | Liam Payne featuring Quavo | "Strip That Down" |
| 29 | Taylor Swift | "Look What You Made Me Do" |
| 30 | Ed Sheeran | "Galway Girl" |
| 31 | Julia Michaels | "Issues" |
| 32 | Calvin Harris featuring Pharrell Williams, Katy Perry and Big Sean | "Feels" |
| 33 | Drake | "Passionfruit" |
| 34 | Katy Perry featuring Skip Marley | "Chained to the Rhythm" |
| 35 | J Balvin and Willy William featuring Beyoncé | "Mi Gente" |
| 36 | Nicki Minaj featuring Jason Derulo and Ty Dolla Sign | "Swalla" |
| 37 | Maroon 5 featuring Kendrick Lamar | "Don't Wanna Know" |
| 38 | Post Malone featuring 21 Savage | "Rockstar" |
| 39 | Calvin Harris featuring Frank Ocean and Migos | "Slide" |
| 40 | Kyle featuring Lil Yachty | "ISpy" |
| 41 | DJ Snake featuring Justin Bieber | "Let Me Love You" |
| 42 | Migos featuring Lil Uzi Vert | "Bad and Boujee" |
| 43 | Imagine Dragons | "Thunder" |
| 44 | Miley Cyrus | "Malibu" |
| 45 | Rae Sremmurd featuring Gucci Mane | "Black Beatles" |
| 46 | Ariana Grande featuring Nicki Minaj | "Side to Side" |
| 47 | Logic featuring Alessia Cara and Khalid | "1-800-273-8255" |
| 48 | Harry Styles | "Sign of the Times" |
| 49 | Drake | "Fake Love" |
| 50 | Justin Timberlake | "Can't Stop the Feeling!" |
| 51 | Demi Lovato | "Sorry Not Sorry" |
| 52 | Drake | "Signs" |
| 53 | Ed Sheeran and Beyoncé | "Perfect" |
| 54 | Justin Bieber featuring David Guetta | "2U" |
| 55 | Cardi B | "Bodak Yellow" |
| 56 | Camila Cabello featuring Young Thug | "Havana" |
| 57 | 21 Savage | "Bank Account" |
| 58 | Childish Gambino | "Redbone" |
| 59 | Pink | "What About Us" |
| 60 | Portugal. The Man | "Feel It Still" |
| 61 | Kendrick Lamar | "DNA" |
| 62 | Maroon 5 featuring Future | "Cold" |
| 63 | Kesha | "Praying" |
| 64 | Dua Lipa | "New Rules" |
| 65 | Machine Gun Kelly and Camila Cabello | "Bad Things" |
| 66 | Sam Smith | "Too Good at Goodbyes" |
| 67 | Twenty One Pilots | "Heathens" |
| 68 | Marshmello featuring Khalid | "Silence" |
| 69 | Selena Gomez | "Bad Liar" |
| 70 | Alessia Cara | "Scars to Your Beautiful" |
| 71 | Shawn Mendes | "Treat You Better" |
| 72 | Sia featuring Kendrick Lamar | "The Greatest" |
| 73 | Rihanna | "Love on the Brain" |
| 74 | Major Lazer featuring PartyNextDoor and Nicki Minaj | "Run Up" |
| 75 | Jon Bellion | "All Time Low" |
| 76 | Major Lazer featuring Justin Bieber and MØ | "Cold Water" |
| 77 | John Legend | "Love Me Now" |
| 78 | Migos | "T-Shirt" |
| 79 | Maroon 5 featuring SZA | "What Lovers Do" |
| 80 | Hailee Steinfeld and Grey featuring Zedd | "Starving" |
| 81 | Kodak Black | "Tunnel Vision" |
| 82 | Clean Bandit featuring Zara Larsson | "Symphony" |
| 83 | Justin Bieber and BloodPop | "Friends" |
| 84 | Shawn Mendes | "Mercy" |
| 85 | Khalid | "Young Dumb & Broke" |
| 86 | Shawn Hook featuring Vanessa Hudgens | "Reminding Me" |
| 87 | Macklemore featuring Skylar Grey | "Glorious" |
| 88 | Halsey | "Now or Never" |
| 89 | Ayo & Teo | "Rolex" |
| 90 | Katy Perry featuring Nicki Minaj | "Swish Swish" |
| 91 | The Weeknd | "Party Monster" |
| 92 | Martin Garrix and Dua Lipa | "Scared to Be Lonely" |
| 93 | Travis Scott | "Butterfly Effect" |
| 94 | Zayn featuring Sia | "Dusk Till Dawn" |
| 95 | Drake featuring Quavo and Travis Scott | "Portland" |
| 96 | Lorde | "Green Light" |
| 97 | Rae Sremmurd | "Swang" |
| 98 | Calvin Harris featuring Rihanna | "This Is What You Came For" |
| 99 | Big Sean | "Bounce Back" |
| 100 | Major Lazer featuring Travis Scott, Camila Cabello and Quavo | "Know No Better" |

== Deaths ==
- January 1 – Stuart Hamilton, 87, pianist and vocal coach
- February 4 – Steve Lang, 67, bassist (April Wine)
- February 13 – Trish Doan, 31, bassist (Kittie)
- August 30 – Skip Prokop, 73, drummer (Lighthouse)
- October 17 – Gord Downie, 53, rock singer and songwriter (The Tragically Hip)
