= 44th Félix Awards =

2022 Canadian music award ceremony

- Date: November 6, 2022
- Hosted by: Louis-José Houde

Television/radio coverage
- Network: SRC

The 43rd Félix Awards were held on November 6, 2022 to honour achievements in Quebec music. The gala was hosted by Louis-José Houde, and televised by Ici Radio-Canada Télé.

The advance ceremony announcing the winners in categories not selected for the main gala was hosted by Pierre Lapointe and broadcast by Télé-Québec on November 2.

== Nominees and winners ==
Male Artist of the Year	Female Artist of the Year
Hubert Lenoir; Ludovick Bourgeois; Corneille; Marc Dupré; Patrice Michaud	Roxane Bruneau; Cœur de pirate; Lisa LeBlanc; Klô Pelgag; Sarahmée
Group of the Year	Revelation of the Year
Salebarbes; 2Frères; Bon Enfant; Les Cowboys Fringants; Les Trois Accords	Ariane Roy; Étienne Coppée; Natasha Kanapé; La Zarra; Jay Scøtt
Song of the Year	Songwriter of the Year
FouKi and Jay Scøtt, "Copilote"; 2Frères, "Sous le même toit"; Ludovick Bourgeois, "L’écho"; Roxane Bruneau, "Si jamais on me cherche"; Clay and Friends, "Bouge Ton Thang"; Cœur de pirate, "On s’aimera toujours"; Lisa LeBlanc, "Pourquoi faire aujourd’hui"; Ariane Moffatt, "Ensemble, sensibles"; Salebarbes, "Good Lord"; Vincent Vallières, "Elle n’entend plus battre son cœur"	Hubert Lenoir — PICTURA DE IPSE: Musique directe; Lou-Adriane Cassidy, Alexandre Martel — Lou-Adriane Cassidy vous dit: Bonsoir; Lisa LeBlanc, Benoit Morier, Michel Roy, Léandre Bourgeois — Chiac Disco; Salomé Leclerc — Mille ouvrages mon cœur; Vincent Roberge, Félix Petit — Crash (Les Louanges)
Indigenous Artist of the Year	Adult Contemporary Album of the Year
Laura Niquay; Beatrice Deer; Natasha Kanapé; Scott-Pien Picard; Samian	Patrice Michaud, Grand voyage désorganisé; 2Frères, Sous le même toit; Pierre Lapointe, L'heure mauve; Salomé Leclerc, Mille ouvrages mon cœur; Gilles Vigneault, Comme une chanson d'amour
Alternative Album of the Year	Anglophone Album of the Year
Hubert Lenoir, PICTURA DE IPSE: Musique directe; Les Louanges, Crash; Lysandre, Sans oublier; Mon Doux Saigneur, Fleur de l'âge; P'tit Belliveau, Un homme et son piano	Naya Ali, Godspeed; Half Moon Run, Inwards & Onwards; Elliot Maginot, Easy Morning; Alicia Moffet, Intertwine; Patrick Watson, Better in the Shade
Bestselling Album of the Year	Classical Album of the Year, Solo or Small Ensemble
Les Cowboys Fringants, Bande sonore originale du film L’Amérique pleure; Jean-Michel Blais, Aubades; Roxane Bruneau, Acrophobie; Paul Daraîche and Renée Martel, Contre vents et marées; Lost, Lostalgik; Mario Pelchat, Comme au premier rendez-vous; Salebarbes, Gin à l’eau salée; Jay Scøtt, Ses Plus Grands Succès; Souldia, Dixque d’art; Guylaine Tanguay, Ginette à ma façon	Angèle Dubeau, Elle; Elinor Frey and Rosa Barocca, Concertos italiens baroques pour violoncelle; Julia MacLaine, Preludes; Yannick Nézet-Séguin, Introspection: Solo piano sessions; Charles Richard-Hamelin and Andrew Wan, Beethoven – Intégrale des sonates pour violon et piano Vol.3: Nos 4, 9, 10
Country Album of the Year	Critic's Choice Album of the Year
Lendemain de veille, Le party est pogné; Éric Goulet, Goulet; Véronique Labbé, Honky Tonk Bar; Karo Laurendeau, De terre et d’asphalte; Bruno Rodéo, Les étoiles se placent	Hubert Lenoir, PICTURA DE IPSE: Musique directe; 2Frères, Sous le même toit; Bon Enfant, Diorama; Lou-Adriane Cassidy, Lou-Adriane Cassidy vous dit: Bonsoir; Lisa LeBlanc, Chiac Disco; Les Louanges, Crash
Electronic Album of the Year	Folk Album of the Year
Millimetrik, Sun-Drenched; Ariel, Chroniques souterraines; DJ Unpier, Dans la danse; Super Plage, Électro-vacances	Jay Scøtt, Ses Plus Grands Succès; Émile Bilodeau, Petite nature; Édith Butler, Le tour du Grand Bois; Étienne Coppée, Et on pleurera ensemble; Tire le coyote, Au premier tour de l’évidence
Indigenous Language Album of the Year	Instrumental Album of the Year
Laura Niquay, Waska Matisiwin; Claude McKenzie, Muk(u)uin; Ninan, Innu Auass; Scott-Pien Picard, Pekuaiapu; Samian, Nikamo	Jean-Michel Blais, Aubades; Philippe Brault, Maria Chapdelaine; Jorane, Hemenetset; Martin Lizotte, Sfumato; Ingrid St-Pierre, Ludmilla
Interpretive Album of the Year	Jazz Album of the Year
Les Cowboys Fringants, Bande sonore originale du film L’Amérique pleure; Paul Daraîche and Renée Martel, Contre vents et marées; Salebarbes, Gin à l’eau salée; Guylaine Tanguay, Ginette à ma façon; Various Artists, Aquanaute 2022	Carl Mayotte, Escale; Jazzlab Orchestra, Loguslabusmuzikus; Yves Léveillé, L’Échelle du Temps; Ron Ledoux Quartet, A Stone’s Throw Away; The Liquor Store, Colossus
Other Language Album of the Year	Pop Album of the Year
TEKE::TEKE, Shirushi; Cordâme, Da Vinci inventions; Richy Jay, Le temps; Radiant Baby, Pantomime	Lisa LeBlanc, Chiac Disco; William Cloutier, On ira; Cœur de pirate, Impossible à aimer; Marc Dupré, Où sera le monde; Ariane Roy, Medium plaisir
Rap Album of the Year	Rock Album of the Year
Souldia, Dixque d'art; KNLO, Sac à surprise; Koriass, Abri de fortune; Lost, Lostalgik; Sarahmée, Poupée Russe	Bon Enfant, Diorama; Lou-Adriane Cassidy, Lou-Adriane Cassidy vous dit: Bonsoir; Gazoline, Gazoline III; Gros Mené, Pax et Bonum; Les Rats d'Swompe, Élixir
Traditional Album of the Year	World Music Album of the Year
Le Vent du Nord, 20 printemps; De Temps Antan, Pesant; Yves Lambert, Lâche moi l’tordeur; Les Grands Hurleurs, Ellipse; Les Tireux d'Roches, Tapiskwan Sipi	Afrikana Soul Sister, Kalasö; Cruzito, Lagrimas y Lambos; Noé Lira, Latiendo la tierra; Okto Echo, Transcestral; Oktopus, Créature
Youth Album or DVD of the Year	Anglophone Concert of the Year
Montreal Symphony Orchestra with Simon Leclerc, Bébé symphonique; Ari Cui Cui, Ari Cui Cui et les patins magiques; Jean-Philippe Morin, Les Supersoniks; Marc Trudel, La mystérieuse école; Various Artists, Le vieillard et l’enfant	Half Moon Run, Look & Listen Tour; Beyries, Encounter; Dominique Fils-Aimé, Three Little Words; Elliot Maginot, Easy Morning; Patrick Watson, A Mermaid in Lisbon
Comedy Concert of the Year	Francophone Concert of the Year
Pierre-Yves Roy-Desmarais, Jokes, Chapeau, Maman, Magie, Piano; Virginie Fortin, Mes sentiments; Louis-José Houde, Mille mauvais choix; Mariana Mazza, Impolie; Arnaud Soly, Stand-up	Klô Pelgag, Notre-Dame-des-Sept-Douleurs; Roxane Bruneau, Acrophobie; Dumas, Le cours des jours; Pierre Lapointe, Pour déjouer l’ennui; Les Cowboys Fringants, Les Antipodes; Patrice Michaud, Grand voyage désorganisé; Ariane Moffatt, Incarnat; Gab Paquet, Séduire pour Survivre; Émile Proulx-Cloutier, À mains nues; Vincent Vallières, Toute beauté n'est pas perdue
Variety or Reinterpretation Concert of the Year	International Collaboration of the Year
Joe Bocan, Marie Carmen and Marie Denise Pelletier, Pour une histoire d’un soir; Rita Baga, Créature; André-Philippe Gagnon, Monsieur tout le monde; Damien Robitaille, Bientôt ce sera Noël; Various Artists, Les polissons de la chanson – Hommage à Georges Brassens	Hubert Lenoir with Bonnie Banane, OCTEMBRE; Cruzito with Ken-Y, Como Ayer; D-Track with Akhenaton, Soroche; Patrick Watson with Teresa Salgueiro, A Mermaid in Lisbon
Most Successful Artist Outside Quebec	Most Successful Artist On the Web
Hubert Lenoir; Jean-Michel Blais; Cœur de pirate; Les Cowboys Fringants; Klô Pelgag; Suuns; Patrick Watson	Damien Robitaille; Louis-Jean Cormier; Jay Scøtt; Alexandra Stréliski; Vincent Vallières
Video of the Year	
FouKi feat. Jay Scøtt, "Copilote"; Louis-Jean Cormier, "Les lignes de ta main"; KNLO feat. Alaclair Ensemble, "ÇA APPELLE"; Hubert Lenoir, "Secret"; Ariane Moffatt, "Incarnat Piano-Film"; Sarahmée feat. FouKi, "Quand la route est longue"
