= Juno Award for Francophone Album of the Year =

Canadian music award

The Juno Award for Francophone Album of the Year is an annual award presented by the Canadian Academy of Recording Arts and Sciences (CARAS) for the best French-language album in Canada. Wanting to add a more inclusive Canadian content to the Award show, Isba Music's Larry Mancini lobbied CARAS to add this award to its roster. It was awarded as the Best Selling Francophone Album, based entirely on album sales, but is now chosen by a jury vote.

The award faced some controversy in 1993 when Mitsou initially received a nomination for her mixed English-French EP Heading West, which was then rescinded on the grounds that the album didn't meet the criteria of being at least 80 per cent francophone. The award committee claimed that the album's failure to qualify in the category had "slipped through the cracks" due to a last-minute submission, but Mitsou herself dismissed the controversy as an unimportant "tempest in a thimble".

== Recipients ==
=== Best Selling Francophone Album (1992–2002) ===
Year	Winner(s)	Album	Nominees	Ref.
1992	Luc de Larochellière	Sauvez mon âme	L'Album du peuple – Tome 1 – François Pérusse; Kathleen – Kathleen; Snob – Les B.B.; Vilain Pingouin – Vilain Pingouin	
1993	Céline Dion	Dion chante Plamondon	Quand on se donne – Francis Martin; À contre-jour – Julie Masse; Aux portes du matin – Richard Séguin	
1994	François Pérusse	L'Album du peuple – Tome 2	Ça va bien – Kathleen; Corridors – Laurence Jalbert; Pelchat – Mario Pelchat; Europe Tour – Roch Voisine	
1995	Roch Voisine	Coup de tête	Obsession – Éric Lapointe; Déchaînée – France d'Amour; Johanne Blouin chante Noel – Johanne Blouin; Y – Lynda Lemay	
1996	Céline Dion	D'eux	Beau Dommage – Beau Dommage; Carpe diem – Lara Fabian; C'est la vie – Mario Pelchat; Bohémienne – Marjo	
1997	Céline Dion	Live à Paris	Quatre saisons dans le désordre – Daniel Bélanger; Pure – Lara Fabian; Luce Dufault – Luce Dufault	
1998	Marie-Michèle Desrosiers	Marie-Michèle Desrosiers chante les classiques de Noël	Miserere – Bruno Pelletier; La force de comprendre – Dubmatique; Versions Reno – Ginette Reno; Parle pas si forte – Térez Montcalm	
1999	Céline Dion	S'il suffisait d'aimer	Enchantée – Carmen Campagne; L'Album du peuple, volume 1 – François Pérusse; Grand parleur, petit faiseur – Kevin Parent; Lynda Lemay – Lynda Lemay	
2000	La Chicane	En catimini	D'autres rives – Bruno Pelletier; Les fourmis – Jean Leloup; Live – Lynda Lemay; Notre-Dame de Paris, version integrale – various artists	
2001	Ginette Reno	Un grand Noël d'amour	Seul – Garou; Mieux qu'ici bas – Isabelle Boulay; Scènes d'amour – Isabelle Boulay; L'Opéra du mendiant – Nicola Ciccone	
2002	Kevin Parent	Les vents ont changé	Etc... – Gabrielle Destroismaisons; Cordial – La Bottine Souriante; Disparu – La Chicane; Du coq à l'âme – Lynda Lemay	

=== Francophone Album of the Year (2003–present) ===
Year	Winner(s)	Album	Nominees	Ref.
2003	Daniel Bélanger	Rêver mieux	Break syndical – Les Cowboys Fringants; Les lettres rouges – Lynda Lemay; De l'amour le mieux – Natasha St-Pier; Rendez-vous – Sylvain Cossette	
2004	Wilfred Le Bouthillier	Wilfred Le Bouthillier	1 fille & 4 types – Céline Dion; Reviens – Garou; Don Juan : un spectacle musical de Félix Gray – Jean François Breau, Marie-Eve Janvier, Mario Pelchat, Claude Léveillée, Philippe Berghella, Cassiopée, Cindy Daniel, and Chico Castillo; Maudit Bordel – Marie-Chantal Toupin	
2005	Marie-Élaine Thibert	Marie-Élaine Thibert	Audrey (album)|Audrey – Audrey de Montigny; Écoute-moi donc – Dany Bédar; Gros mammouth – Les Trois Accords; J't'aime tout court – Nicola Ciccone	
2006	Jim Corcoran	Pages blanches	Le Trashy Saloon – Anik Jean; Hors de tout doute – France D'Amour; Garde la tête haute – Senaya; Sur le fil – Stéphanie Lapointe	
2007	Antoine Gratton	Il était une fois dans l'est	Le coeur dans la tête – Ariane Moffatt; Trompe-l'œil – Malajube; La Forêt des mal-aimés – Pierre Lapointe; Compter les corps – Vulgaires Machins	
2008	Daniel Bélanger	L'Échec du matériel	D'elles – Céline Dion; L'homme qui me ressemble – Damien Robitaille; De retour à la source – Isabelle Boulay; Vers à soi – Jorane	
2009	Ariane Moffatt	Tous les sens	L'arbre aux parfums – Caracol; Cœur de pirate – Cœur de pirate; Le Volume du vent – Karkwa; Tradarnac – Swing	
2010	Andrea Lindsay	Les sentinelles dorment	Mille excuses milady – Jean Leloup; Dans mon corps – Les Trois Accords; Un toi dans ma tête – Luc de Larochellière; Un serpent sous les fleurs – Yann Perreau	
2011	Karkwa	Les Chemins de verre	Brun – Bernard Adamus; Nous – Daniel Bélanger; Silence – Fred Pellerin; Belmundo Regal – Radio Radio	
2012	Malajube	La caverne	Le désert des solitudes – Catherine Major; Blonde – Cœur de pirate; C'est un monde – Fred Pellerin; Le vrai le faux – Jérôme Minière	
2013	Louis-Jean Cormier	Le treizième étage	Le Royaume – Amylie; Astronomie – Avec pas d'casque; Lisa Leblanc – Lisa Leblanc; Aux alentours – Marie-Pierre Arthur	
2014	Karim Ouellet	Fox	Himalaya mon amour – Alex Nevsky; Omniprésent – Damien Robitaille; Chic de ville – Daniel Bélanger; Punkt – Pierre Lapointe	
2015	Jimmy Hunt	Maladie d'amour	Ornithologie, la nuit – Philippe B; Serge Fiori – Serge Fiori; L'alchimie des monstres - Klô Pelgag; Valse 333 – Julien Sagot	
2016	Jean Leloup	À Paradis City	Si l'aurore – Marie-Pierre Arthur; Les grandes artères – Louis-Jean Cormier; Zulu – Galaxie; 22h22 – Ariane Moffatt	
2017	Laurence Nerbonne	XO	Ultramarr – Fred Fortin; Love Suprême – Koriass; Trente – Karim Ouellet; Le fantastique des astres – Yann Perreau	
2018	Daniel Bélanger	Paloma	Nos Eldorados – Alex Nevsky; L'Étoile thoracique – Klô Pelgag; Almanach – Patrice Michaud; La Science du cœur – Pierre Lapointe	
2019	Loud	Une année record	Le silence des troupeaux — Philippe Brach; En cas de tempête, ce jardin sera fermé — Cœur de pirate; Darlène — Hubert Lenoir; Désherbage — Tire le coyote	
2020	Les Louanges	La nuit est une panthère	La nuit des longs couteaux — Koriass; L'Étrange pays — Jean Leloup; Tout ça pour ça — Loud; Après — Fred Pellerin	
2021	Louis-Jean Cormier	Quand la nuit tombe	À tous les vents — 2Frères; Les antipodes — Les Cowboys Fringants; Pour déjouer l'ennui — Pierre Lapointe; Notre-Dame-des-Sept-Douleurs — Klô Pelgag	
2022	Cœur de pirate	Impossible à aimer	Acrophobie — Roxane Bruneau; Le ciel est au plancher — Louis-Jean Cormier; Grignotines de Luxe — FouKi; Toute beauté n’est pas perdue — Vincent Vallières	
2023	Les Louanges	Crash	Chiac Disco — Lisa Leblanc; Medium plaisir — Ariane Roy; Mercure en mai — Daniel Bélanger; PICTURA DE IPSE: Musique directe — Hubert Lenoir	
2024	Les Cowboys Fringants with the Montreal Symphony Orchestra	En concert avec l’Orchestre symphonique de Montréal (sous la direction du chef Simon Leclerc)	FouKi, Zayon; Karkwa, Dans la seconde; Salebarbes, À boire deboutte; Souldia, Non conventionnel	
2025	Klô Pelgag	Abracadabra	Les Cowboys Fringants, Pub Royal; Fredz, Demain il fera beau; Aliocha Schneider, Aliocha Schneider; Jay Scott, Toutes les rues sont silencieuses	
2026	Lou-Adriane Cassidy	Journal d'un loup-garou	Fredz, On s'enverra des fleurs; Pierre Lapointe, Dix chansons démodées pour ceux qui ont le cœur abîmé; Jean-François Pauzé, Les amours de seconde main; Ariane Roy, Dogue	
