= Fredz =

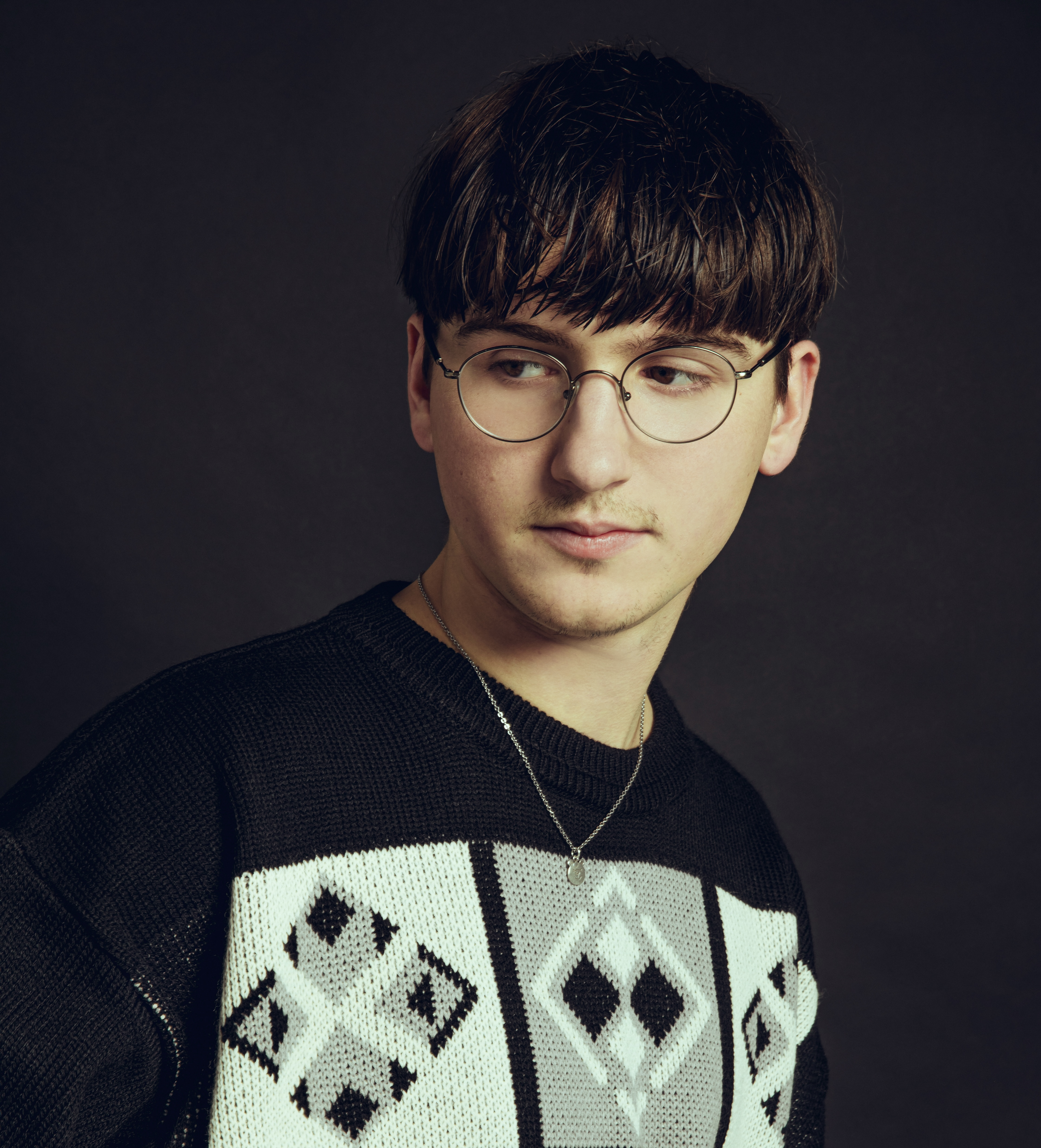

Background information
- Born: Frédéric Carrier; January 25, 2002 (age 24); Longueuil, Quebec, Canada
- Genres: Pop, hip-hop
- Occupations: Singer, Rapper
- Years active: 2015-present

Frédéric Carrier (born January 25, 2002), known professionally as Fredz, is a Canadian singer from Longueuil, Quebec. He is most noted for his 2024 album Demain il fera beau, which was a Félix Award nominee for Rap Album of the Year at the 46th Félix Awards in 2024, and a Juno Award nominee for Francophone Album of the Year at sure the Juno Awards of 2025.

His 2025 album On s'enverra des fleurs was shortlisted for Francophone Album of the Year at the Juno Awards of 2026.

== Discography ==
- Pas d'épines, pas de roses - 2019
- Dans ma tête - 2019
- Personne ne touche le ciel - 2020
- Astronaute - 2022
- Demain il fera beau - 2024
- On s’enverra des fleurs - 2025
- Extraordinaire - 2025
