= Elliot Maginot =

Canadian singer-songwriter

Elliot Maginot is the stage name of Gabriel Hélie-Harvey, a Canadian singer-songwriter from Quebec. He is most noted for his 2021 album Easy Morning, which was longlisted for the 2021 Polaris Music Prize and was a Félix Award nominee for Anglophone Album of the Year at the 44th Félix Awards in 2022.

Maginot writes and performs in English despite being a francophone Quebecer.

== Discography ==
- Young/Old/Everything.In.Between (2014)
- Comrades (2018)
- Easy Morning (2021)
