= Laura Niquay =

Atikamekw singer-songwriter

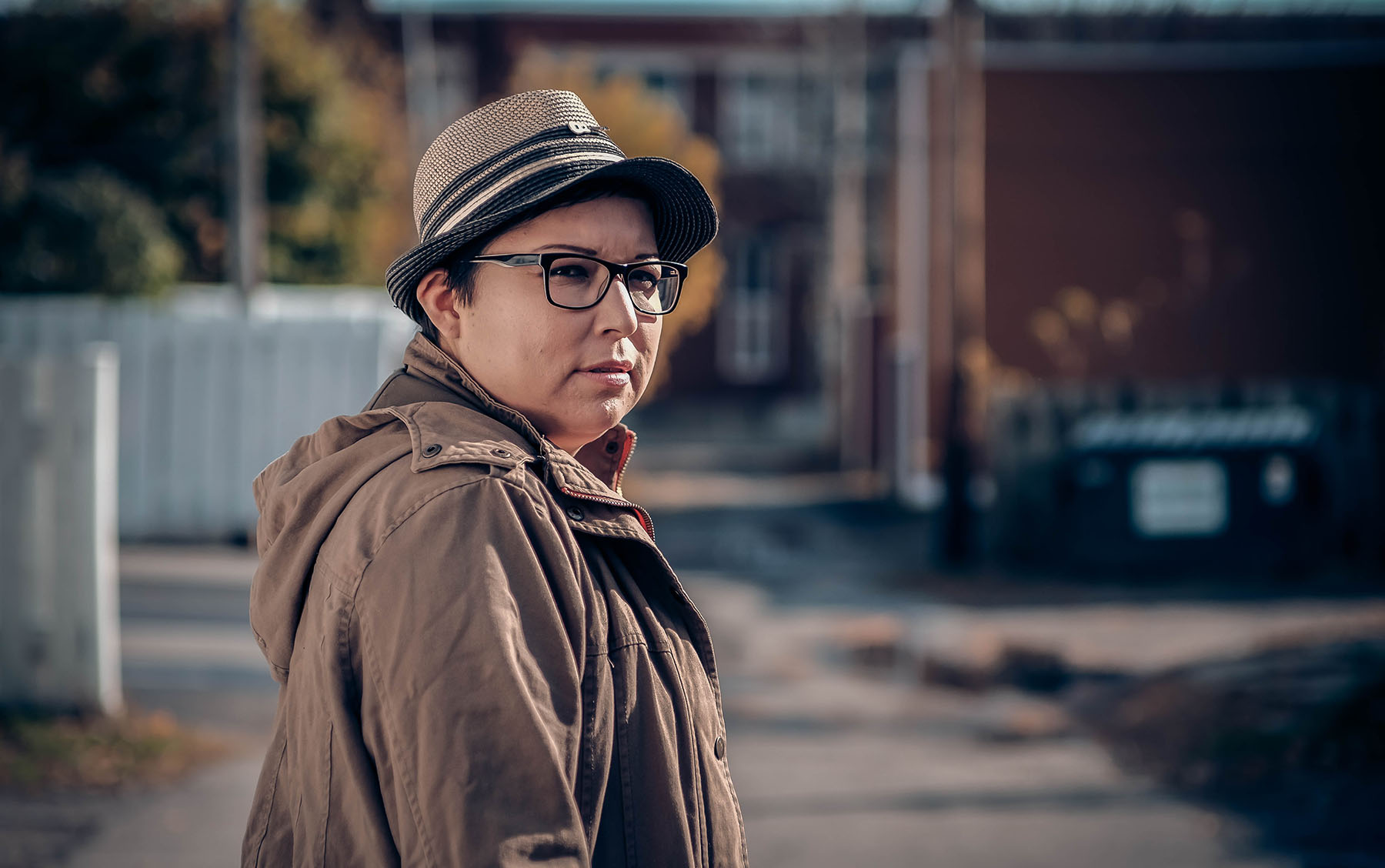

Laura Niquay (born 1982) is an Atikamekw singer-songwriter from Canada, whose album Waska Matisiwin was a longlisted nominee for the 2021 Polaris Music Prize.

Originally from Wemotaci, Quebec, Niquay participated in the recording of her uncle Arthur Petiquay's 2005 album Awacic. She released her own debut album, Waratanak, in 2015, and followed up with Waska Matisiwin in 2021. Waska Matisiwin won the Félix Award for Indigenous Language Album of the Year, and Niquay won the award for Indigenous Artist of the Year, at the 44th Félix Awards in 2022.
