= Carl Mayotte =

Canadian musician

- Born: Quebec City, Quebec, Canada
- Genres: Jazz fusion
- Occupations: musician; composer; arranger; conductor
- Instrument: Bass guitar
- Member of: Carl Mayotte Quintet
- Website: carlmayotte.com

Carl Mayotte is a Canadian bass guitarist, composer, arranger and conductor. In 2018, he formed a jazz fusion group, the Carl Mayotte Quintet.

== Early life ==
He began his musical career at age 16, playing in many bars and events around Quebec, Canada. He completed a technical degree at Campus Notre-Dame-de-Foy before completing his bachelor's degree in jazz interpretation at Laval University, followed by a Master's degree with the jazz faculty of McGill University.

He traveled across Quebec, and many times to France, with the goal of democratizing jazz and bringing this musical genre to the forefront.

== Influences ==
He did not limit himself to jazz music. In an interview with Radio-Canada, he stated, "I try to listen to as many styles as possible, and above all, I do not want to put up barriers for myself". He listens to pop music, has said that he enjoys the New Zealand singer Kimbra, and when he was younger listened to rock and progressive metal groups, such as Tool, Primus, and Dream Theater. In going from classical music to the more modern jazz fusion, he is able to appreciate and be inspired by many different styles of music.

== Carl Mayotte Quintet ==
With his group Carl Mayotte Quintet, including Gabriel Cyrl (electric guitar), Francis Grégoire (keyboard), Damien-Jade Cyr (saxophone) and Stéphane Chamberland (drums), he had the chance to participate in many concerts, events, festivals as well as offering master classes in CEGEPs, conservatories and universities across the province of Quebec. His first album with Carl Mayotte Quintet and has worked with Michel Cusson.

== Music camp ==
In the summer of 2022, Mayotte created a new jazz music camp in St-Alexandre de Kamouraska, bringing together musicians of all ages and levels.

== Recognition ==
- Révélation in jazz: Radio-Canada (2020–21) for Fantosme (2019).
- Jazz Album of the Year nominee. Le Premier Gala de l'ADISQ
- Félix Album of the Year for Escale (2022)

== Discography ==
Mayotte participated in multiple projects:

=== Carl Mayotte Quintet ===
- 2019 : Fantosme
- 2021 : Pop de Ville, Vol.1
- 2022 : Escale
- 2023 : Carnaval

=== Nouvelle R ===
- 2015 : L’emporte-pièce
- 2017 : Sendionek Mastro
- 2018 : Sénescence

=== De Si Belles ===
- 2018 : De Si Belles

=== Other projects ===
- 2016 : Marie-Claire Quartet : 60/40
- 2022 : Carl Mayotte: In a Sentimental Mood

=== Appearances on other albums ===
- 2020 : Félix Connolly : Entre Deux
- 2021 : François Doyon : Noël

== Videography ==
Mayotte appeared in multiple video projects

=== Clips (Carl Mayotte Quintet) ===
- 2019 : Marise
- 2023 : Le Saltimbanque

=== Clips (Triton Trio) ===
- 2013 : Triton Trio - medley de musique de film
- 2016 : Triton Trio - Concerto Rock
- 2018 : Triton Trio - Demo 2018
- 2020 : Super Mario Bros Medley - Triton Trio
