= Millimetrik =

Millimetrik is the stage name of Pascal Asselin, a Canadian electronic musician from Quebec City, Quebec. He is most noted as a two-time Félix Award winner for Electronic Album of the Year, winning at the 41st Félix Awards in 2019 for Make It Last Forever and at the 44th Félix Awards in 2022 for Sun-Drenched.

== Discography ==
=== Albums ===
- Northwest Passage's New Era - 2008
- Mystique Drums - 2010
- Read Between the Rhymes - 2012
- Lonely Lights - 2014
- Fog Dreams - 2016
- Make It Last Forever - 2019
- Sun-Drenched - 2021

=== EPs ===
- Cities - 2006
- Keys - 2008
- Afterglow - 2010
- Around You - 2011
- Influences - 2011
- Remix the Rhymes - 2013
- Remixed Lights - 2014
- Sour Mash - 2017
