= Sarahmée =

Senegalese-Canadian rapper (born 1988)

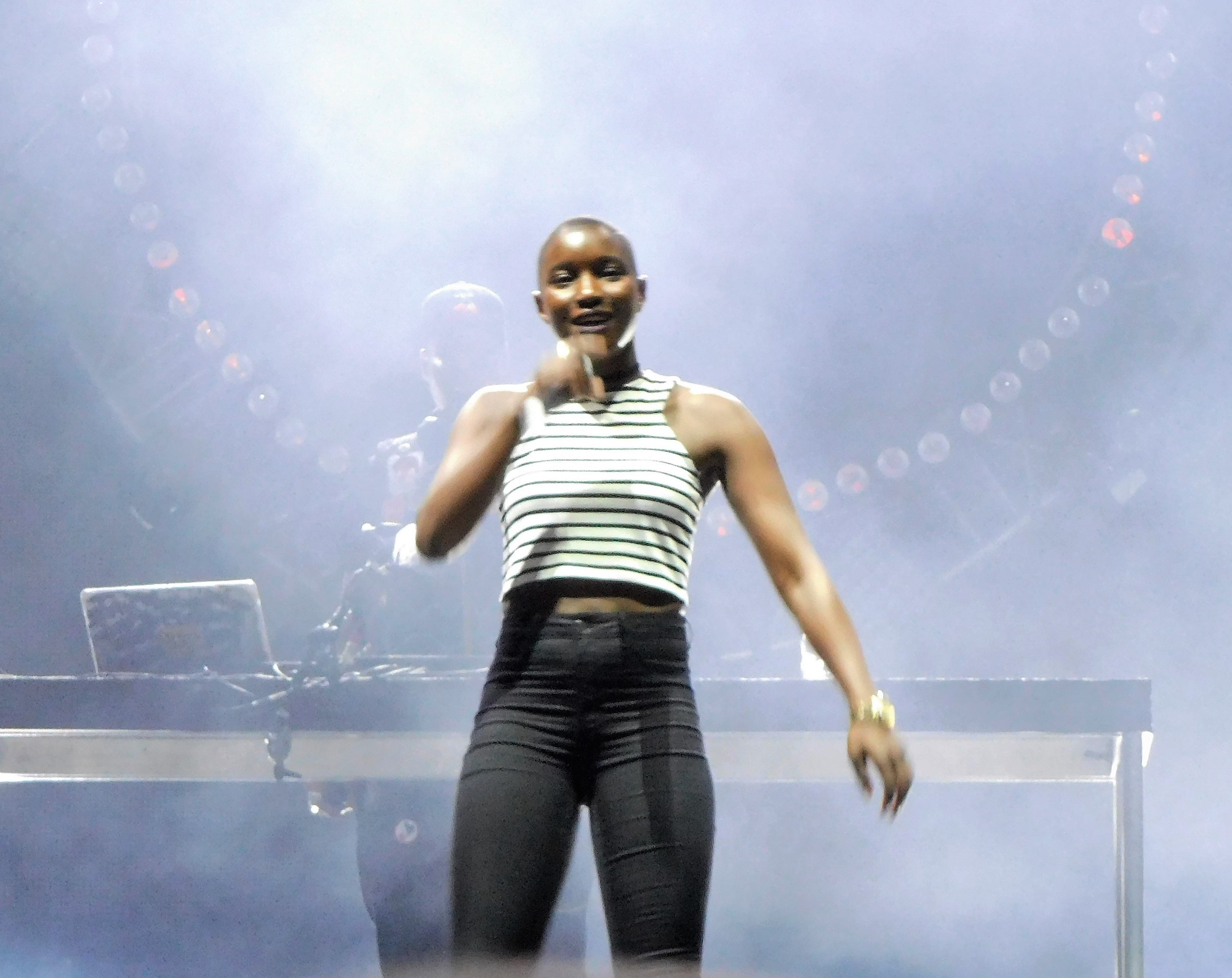
Sarahmée

Sarahmée Ouellet (born 1986 in Dakar, Senegal), mononymously known as Sarahmée, is a Senegalese-Canadian rapper from Quebec. She is most noted for her single "T'as pas cru", which was shortlisted for the 2019 SOCAN Songwriting Prize.

The sister of singer-songwriter Karim Ouellet, she released the EPs Retox in 2011 and Sans détour in 2013 before releasing her full-length debut album Légitime in 2015. She followed up with Irréversible in 2019, and received a Prix Félix nomination for Revelation of the Year at the Gala de l'ADISQ in 2019. The video for her single "Bun Dem", directed by Caraz, was also a Juno Award nominee for Video of the Year at the Juno Awards of 2020.

In 2024 she released Pleure pas ma fille, sinon Maman va pleurer, an album about her grieving her brother's death in 2021.
