= Ariane Roy =

Québécois singer-songwriter (born 1997)

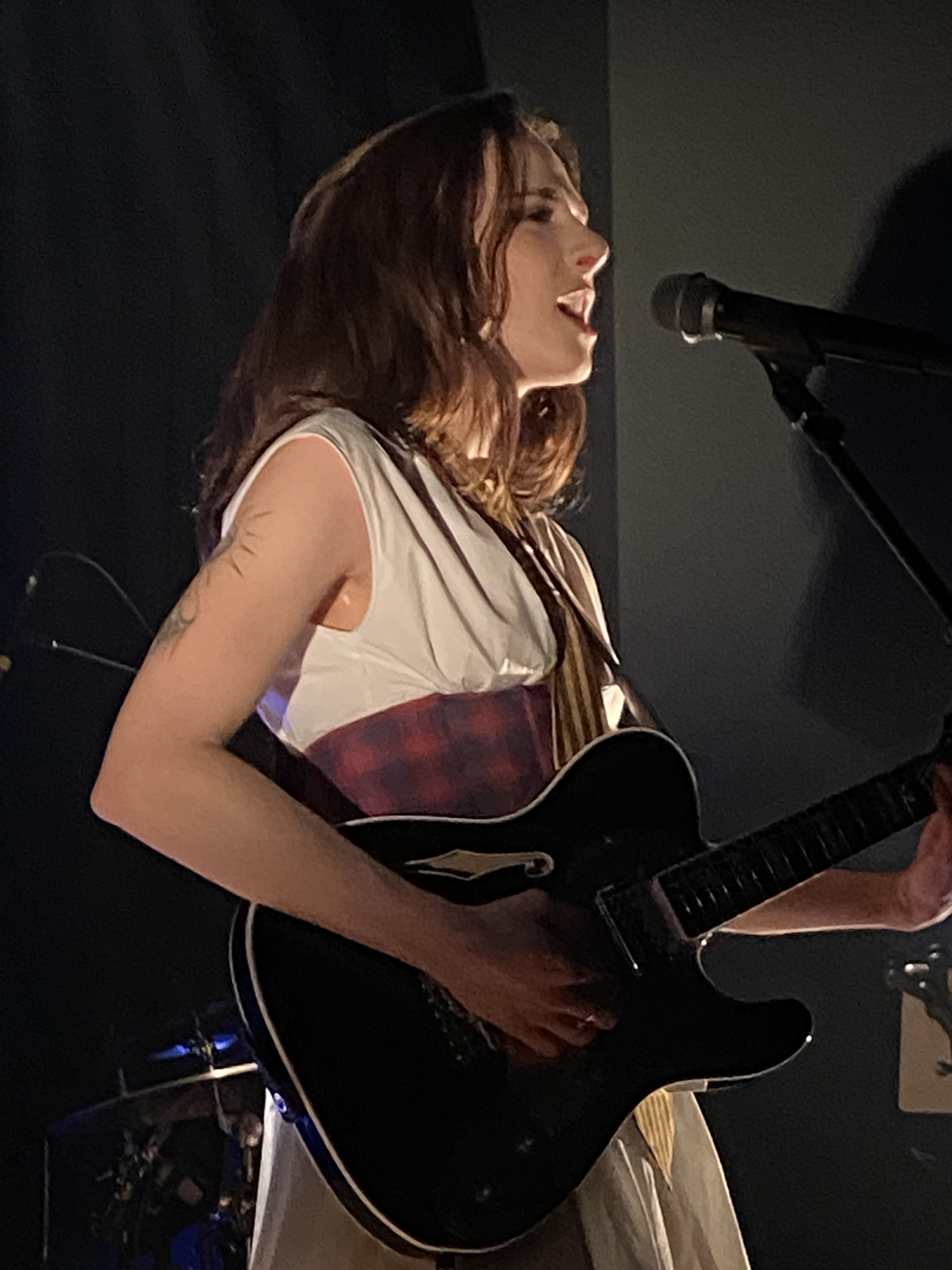
- Ariane Roy at Cabaret La Basoche in April 2026

Background information
- Born: Quebec City, Quebec, Canada
- Genres: Indie pop, folk
- Occupations: Musician, singer-songwriter
- Years active: 2019–present
- Label: La Maison Fauve

Ariane Roy (born March 19, 1997) is a Québécois pop singer-songwriter from Quebec City, Quebec, whose debut album Medium plaisir was released in 2022.

She was a finalist in the virtual 2020 edition of the Francouvertes music competition.

Her single "Ta main", cowritten with Pierre Emmanuel Beaudoin, Vincent Gagnon, Dominique Plante, Cédric Martel and Roxane Azzaria, was a SOCAN Songwriting Prize nominee in the French category in 2021. Its music video, directed by Adrian Villagomez, was a Félix Award nominee for Video of the Year at the 43rd Félix Awards, and a Juno Award nominee for Video of the Year at the Juno Awards of 2022.

In 2022, Roy and Plante received a second SOCAN Songwriting Prize nomination for "Ce n'est pas de la chance".

At the 44th Félix Awards in 2022, Roy won the award for Revelation of the Year and Medium plaisir was a nominee for Pop Album of the Year, and at the Juno Awards of 2023, Medium plaisir was nominated for Francophone Album of the Year.

Her second album, Dogue, launched on March 28, 2025, was longlisted for the 2025 Polaris Music Prize, and for Francophone Album of the Year at the Juno Awards of 2026.
