= Yann Perreau =

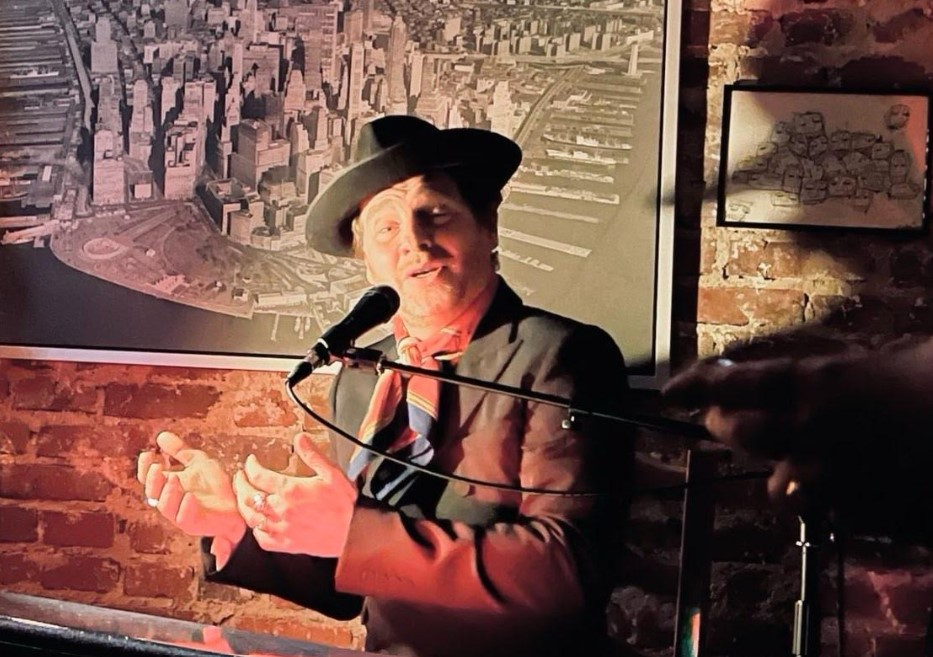
- Yann Perreau at the FrancoFolies de Montréal on 14 June 2010

Background information
- Born: 1976 (age 49–50); Lanaudière, Quebec, Canada
- Genre: Pop-rock-electro
- Occupation: Singer
- Label: Bonsound
- Website: yannperreau.com

Yann Perreau (born 1976) is a Canadian singer songwriter from Quebec specialising in rock-electro music. Between 1994 and 1999, he was a member of Doc et les Chirurgiens, before becoming a solo artist.

== Biography ==
=== Beginnings ===
Yann Perreau grew up in a musical oriented family. His parents ran a bar that invited many well-known names to perform at the venue. He took part in a province wide college musical competition Cégeps en spectacle in 1994.

=== Doc et les Chirurgiens ===
At 18, he joined guitar player David Blais and drummer Steve Cournoyer to form the band Doc et les Chirurgiens, band based in Lanaudière, Quebec but with pan-provincial success. In its first year of formation, the trio won the Quebec music competition Cégeps Rock and the L'Empire des futures stars in 1994 and were signed to the label Disquébec. In its five years of existence, the band released two albums. The single "Shake Your Fire Maker" released on their album 13 found great success on Quebec radio stations. Disquébec shut down operations in 1997 and the band continued for a while announcing it is disbanding in 1999 after a farewell concert at the cabaret du Musée Juste pour rire.

=== Solo ===
Yann Perreau continued his career and played the marionette in youth theatre show Les quatre saisons de Picot by Gilles Vigneault for 4 seasons. He also appeared in various events in Quebec and France through a tour organised by the Office franco-québécois pour la jeunesse. Returning to Québec, he appeared in the music festival Coup de cœur francophone 2001 and cooperated with the musician Gilles Brisebois. In Peru he worked with the theatre group Vichama, and composed the soundtrack for Casa Loma: journal de bord.

His debut solo album Western Romance released in November 2002 with the label FouleSpin Musique contained songs co-written with Fredric Gary Comeau. He appeared in a number of festivals, won the award Rapsat-Lelièvre at the Francofolies de Spa in Belgium, the award Miroir de l'artiste d'ici at the Festival d'été de Québec and Prix Félix-Leclerc de la chanson 2003 at the FrancoFolies de Montréal making in 2004 to the closing concert event at the FrancoFolies.

His second album Nucléaire was in April 2005 with two singles "La vie n'est pas qu'une salope" and Guerrière'x receiving airplay and in the same year was invited on the "Carte Blanche" show by Alain Bashung at the FrancoFolies de Montréal. In 2006, he won the Bourse Rideau.

In 2007, he returned to the stage with the show Perreau et la Lune It was later released as a DVD Perreau et la lune live au Quat'Sous by Bonsound Records. His album Un serpent sous les fleurs released by Bonsound Records in 2009 was nominated for Best francophone album during the 2010 Juno Awards, the Canadian equivalent of the Grammies.

He later produced Alex Nevsky’s debut De Lune à l’Aube (2010) and collaborated with poet Claude Péloquin on À genoux dans le désir (2012), recorded in his own Mystic Studio.

His album Le fantastique des astres became his most successful one, release in 2016, spawning hit singles and a tour across Canada and Europe. Perreau also directed the Discothèque show for the Montreal International Jazz Festival in 2017, co-hosted L’autre gala de l’ADISQ with Marie-Mai in 2018, and continued to release new work, including the EP Voyager léger (2018) and the single Goûter le temps (2020). In 2024, he composed the score for The Award, a production by the Belgian circus troupe.

In the autumn of 2024, Yann Perreau released his album El Perro del Amor and began a solo tour across Quebec.

In 2026, he created Renaud Symphonique, a show celebrating Renaud’s 50-year career, featuring some 15 performers—including Diane Dufresne and Isabelle Boulay—as well as the Montreal National Jazz Orchestra, under the musical direction of Antoine Gratton. Two performances took place on October 9 and 11, 2026, in Montreal and Quebec City, respectively, with Renaud in attendance.

== Discography ==
=== Albums ===
- 2002: Western Romance [FouleSpin]
- 2005: Nucléaire [FouleSpin]
- 2009: Un serpent sous les fleurs [Bonsound]
- 2012: À genoux dans le désir [Productions du Renard]
- 2016: Le Fantastique des Astres [Bonsound]
- 2018 : Voyager léger (EP) [Les Productions du Renard]
- 2024 : El Perro del Amor

=== DVDs ===
- 2008: Perreau et la lune live au Quat'Sous [Bonsound]

=== Videography ===
Songs

- 2002: "Fille d'automne"
- 2003: "L'amour est une bombe"
- 2003: "Ma dope à moi"
- 2005: "La vie n'est pas qu'une salope"
- 2006: "Guerrière"
- 2009: "Beau comme on s'aime"
- 2009: "Le président danse autrement"
- 2010: "L'amour se meurt"
- 2011: "Le bruit des bottes"
- 2016: "J'aime les oiseaux"
- 2016: "Faut pas se fier aux apparences"
