= Philippe Brach =

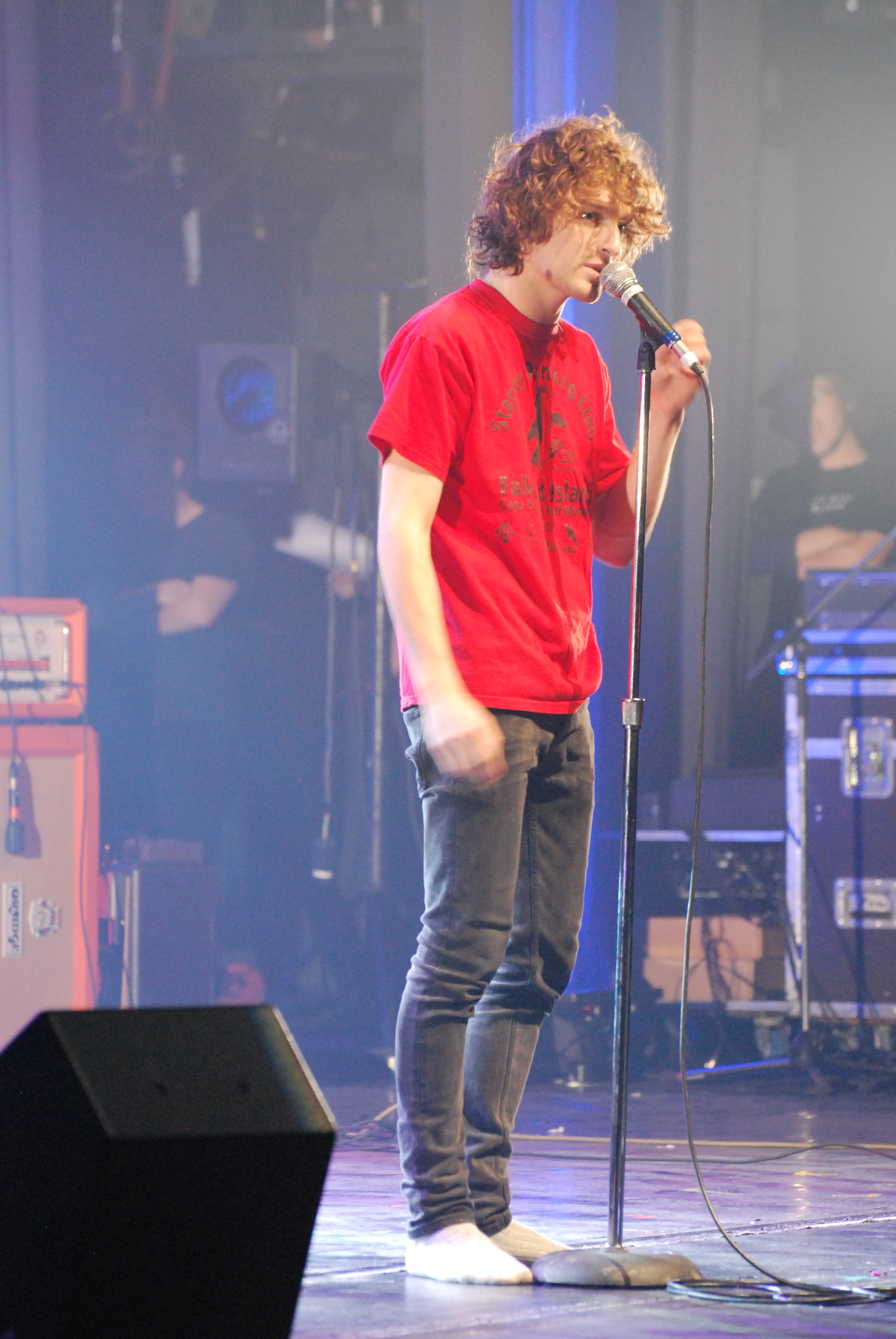

Background information
- Born: Philippe Bouchard; July 22, 1989 (age 37); Saguenay, Quebec
- Genres: pop rock, folk rock
- Occupation: singer-songwriter
- Instruments: Vocals, guitar
- Years active: 2012-present

Philippe Brach is the stage name of Philippe Bouchard (born July 22, 1989), a Canadian singer-songwriter from Saguenay, Quebec.

Launching his music career in 2012, he was the winner of the Francouvertes festival in 2014. Several weeks later, he released his debut album La foire et l'ordre. He won the Prix Félix for Revelation of the Year in 2015.

His second album, Portraits de famine, followed in 2015, and his third, Le silence des troupeaux, was released in 2017. He was a SOCAN Songwriting Prize nominee in 2016 for "Crystel" from Portraits de famine, and in 2018 for "La fin du monde" from Le silence des troupeaux, and Le silence de troupeaux was longlisted for the 2018 Polaris Music Prize.

He is a frequent collaborator with singer and songwriter Klô Pelgag, including on the duets "Si proche et si loin à la fois" from Portraits de famine and a cover of Richard Desjardins's "Les Yankees" for the tribute album Hommage à Desjardins.

At the Juno Awards of 2019, Le silence des troupeaux was shortlisted for the Juno Award for Francophone Album of the Year.

His album Les gens qu'on aime was longlisted for the 2023 Polaris Music Prize.
