= Alicia Moffet =

Canadian pop singer

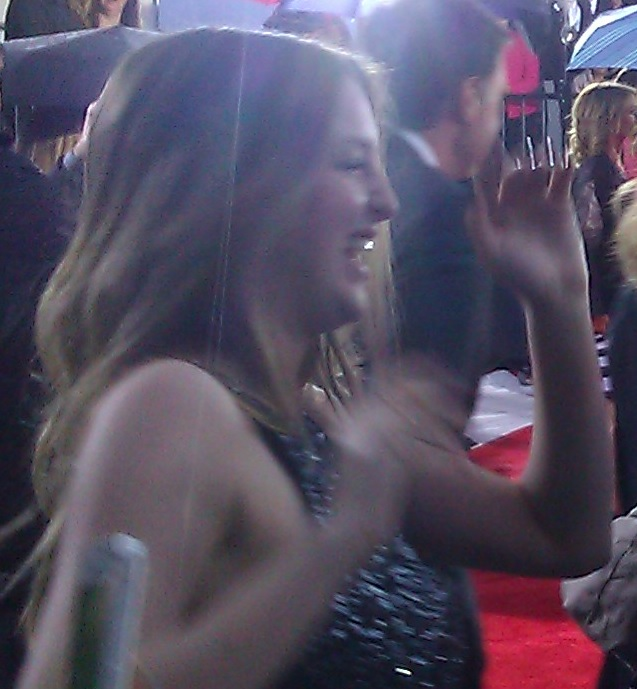
- Alicia Moffet at the Gala Artis red carpet, Montreal, April 2015.

Background information
- Born: Saint-Lazare, Quebec, Canada
- Genre: Pop
- Occupations: Singer, songwriter, actress, television host
- Years active: 2013–present
- Labels: Sony Music (2013–2014); Independent (2019–2024); Cult Nation (2025–present)
- Website: facebook.com/aliciamoffet
- Partner(s): Alexandre Mentink (2018–2021); Frédérick Robichaud (2022–2026)
- Children: 1

Alicia Moffet is a Canadian singer, songwriter, actress, and television host. She first gained national recognition after winning the sixth season of The Next Star in 2013.

Born in Quebec City and raised in Saint-Lazare, Moffet later competed in the 2015 season of La Voix, where she reached the semi-finals.

After relocating to Montreal at age 18 to pursue a music career, Moffet released many singles and albums, including Billie Ave., Intertwine, and No, I'm Not Crying.

In addition to her music career, she expanded into television and co-hosted the reality television series Occupation Double from 2023 to 2024.

== Career ==
Moffet has been singing since 2008. In May 2013, Moffet auditioned for The Next Star. She got a golden ticket and was accepted into the top 13. She made the top 9 in late June 2013. She was chosen to be in the top six and crowned winner of season 6 on September 22, 2013, at Canada's Wonderland, where the live season finale was held.

Moffet released her own single during The Next Star broadcast, entitled "Better Watch Out for Me" released September 16, 2013. Together with the other contestants, she recorded the single "We Just Don't Care", released September 9, 2013. On September 23, 2013, at the live show she performed "We Just Don't Care", "Better Watch Out for Me" and the "winner's song" "Roar" by Katy Perry. She was crowned winner with over 3 million votes, receiving as a prize the chance to record a single licensed by Sony Music Canada.

In March 2014, Sony released the single "Why Do Boys Lie" (Pourquoi Mentir). At the beginning of 2015, Moffet featured on La Voix (Canada).

She released her first album Billie Ave. on June 26, 2020. Some of the songs were written with other artists, including Milk & Bone and Jonathan Roy.

Then, in early 2022, Moffet released her second album, Intertwine. In her opinion, the second album is a true reflection of herself.

In 2023 and 2024, she hosted the show Occupation Double with her then-boyfriend, Frederick Robichaud.

At the 2026 ADISQ Gala, Moffet won the Félix for English Show of the Year for her tour No, I'm Not Crying. Following a performance, she thanked her musicians, Cult Nation team, and fans. This milestone ties in with her new French single "Sans toi" and a nine-date Quebec tour throughout November.

== Personal life ==
Moffet began dating Alexandre Mentink on June 1, 2018. On July 20, 2019, the couple had their first child, a daughter named Billie Lou Mentink. In December 2021, she announced their breakup on social media, according to the Narcity Québec blog.

In 2022, Moffet began a relationship with former Occupation Double contestant Frédérick Robichaud. Moffet and Robichaud announced their breakup in May 2026, though they continued to work together as co-hosts of the reality television show Occupation Double. She later released the single "Forever", in which she sings about the heartbreak following their separation.

== Filmography ==
Year	Title	Role	Notes
2013	The Next Star	Herself	Top 6; winner
2013	The Zone	Herself	Interview
2015	La Voix	Herself	Eliminated (Top 8)

== Discography ==
=== Studio albums ===
Year	Title	Release date	Label
2020	Billie Ave.	June 26	Productions Alicia Moffet Inc.
2022	Intertwine	March 25	Productions Alicia Moffet Inc.
2025	No, I'm Not Crying	May 30	Cult Nation

=== Singles ===
Year	Title	Peak chart positions			Certifications	Album
Year	Title	CAN	CAN CHR	CAN HAC	Certifications	Album
2013	"We Just Don't Care" (as part of The Next Star; Top 6)	—	—	—		Non-album singles
2013	"Better Watch Out for Me"	—	—	—		Non-album singles
2014	"Why Do Boys Lie"	—	—	—		Non-album singles
2014	"Pourquoi mentir"	—	—	—		Non-album singles
2019	"Take Control"	—	—	—		Billie Ave.
2019	"Open Up"	—	—	—		Billie Ave.
2019	"Beautiful Scar"	—	—	—	MC: Gold	Billie Ave.
2020	"On Your Mind" (with Shaun Frank)	—	—	—		Non-album singles
2020	"Ciel" (with FouKi)	—	—	—	MC: Platinum	Non-album singles
2020	"Body High"	—	—	—		Non-album singles
2022	"Lullaby"	24	—	—	MC: Platinum	Intertwine
2022	"Winter Wonderland"	—	—	—		Non-album singles
2023	"Didn't Try"	—	—	—		Non-album singles
2025	"Choke"	—	—	—		No, I'm Not Crying
2025	"Lay Your Light"	68	10	6		No, I'm Not Crying
2026	"Forever"	54	—	—		Non-album singles
2026	"Sans toi"	62	—	—		Non-album singles
"—" denotes a recording that did not chart or was not released in that territory.

=== Guest appearances ===
Year	Title	Artist	Number of tracks	Release date
2013	"YTV's The Next Star - Season 6 Top 6"	Alicia Moffet, Alex Zaichowski, Paige Prescott; Kat Moscone, Dante Scott & Jaden MacPhee	7	September 17, 2013

=== Prizes and awards ===
Year	Award	Category	Nominated work	Result
2026	SOCAN Award	Top 20 of the CBC Music charts	"Lay Your Light"	Won
2026	Félix Award	Concert of the Year – Anglophone	No, I'm Not Crying	Won
