= Le Diable à Cinq =

Canadian folk music band

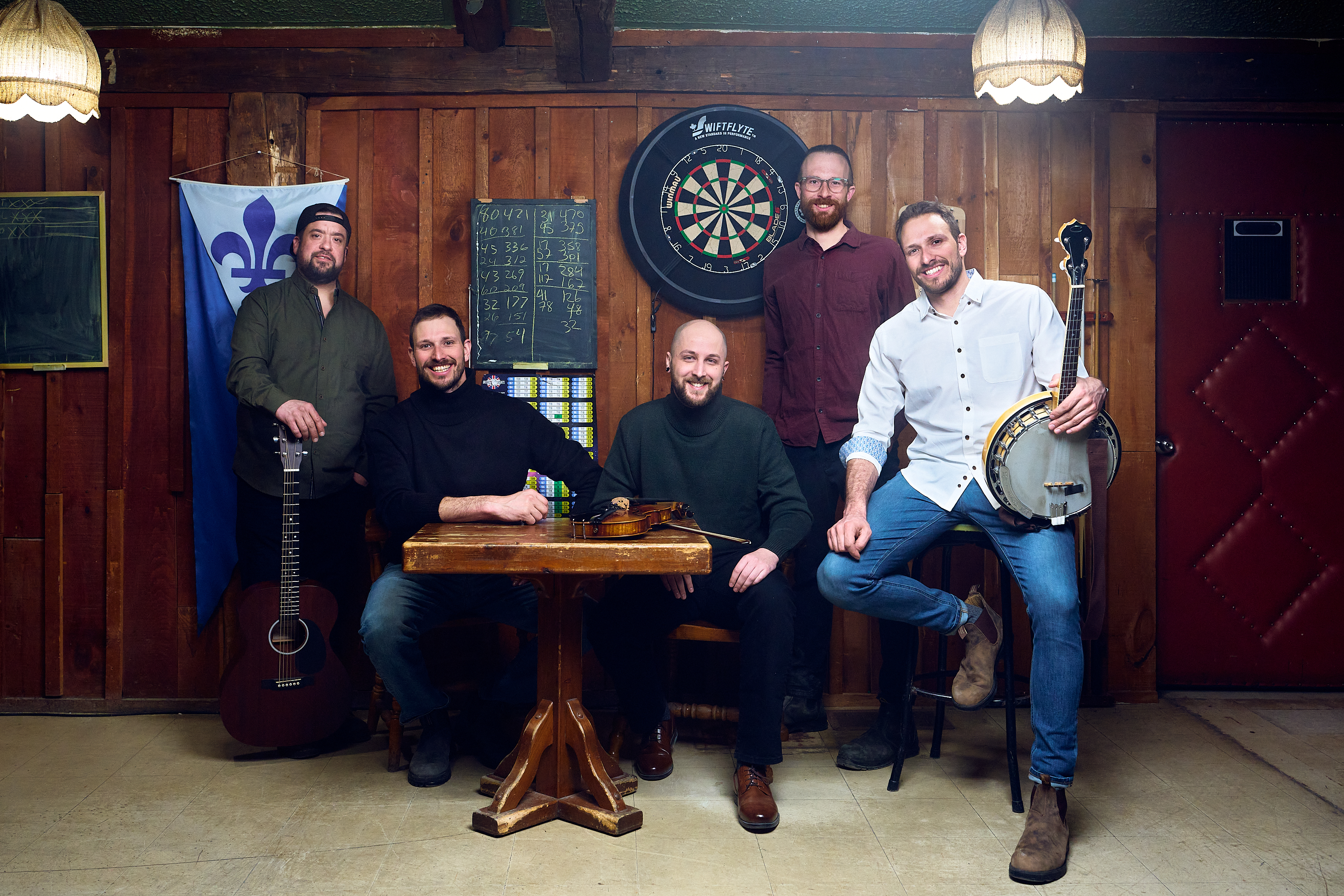

Background information
- Origin: Ripon, Quebec
- Genre: folk music
- Years active: 2015-present
- Label: Le Diable à Cinq
- Members: Samuel Sabourin; Félix Sabourin; Éloi Gagnon Sabourin; André-Michel "Brun" Dambremont; Guillaume Beaulieu
- Past members: Vincent Ouellette-Destroimaisons; Rémi Pagé
- Website: https://diablea5.com/

Le Diable à Cinq is a Canadian folk music group from the Outaouais region of Quebec, who play traditional Québécois folk music. Based in the town of Ripon, the group consists of brothers Éloi, Samuel and Félix Sabourin, their cousin André-Michel Dambremont, and their friend Guillaume Beaulieu.

== Awards and recognitions ==
The band released their first album, Sorti de l'enfer, in 2017, followed up in 2019 with Debout! and in 2023 byTempête. Debout! was a Felix Award nominee for Traditional Album of the Year at the 42nd Felix Awards, a Canadian Folk Music Award nominee for Traditional Album of the Year at the 16th Canadian Folk Music Awards, as well as a nominee in Juno Awards of 2021 in the Traditional Roots Album of the Year.

The album Debout! Also won, at the first ADISQ 2020 Gala, the prize of Ma Première Nomination l'ADISQ. This prize is awarded by the votes of the public and is intended for artists nominated for the first time at the ADISQ Gala. With this award, Le Diable à cinq follows in the footsteps of Roxane Bruneau and Souldia, winners in 2018 and 2019, respectively. The album Tempête also received a Félix Award nomination for Traditional Album of the Year in 2023. At the end of 2025, the band announced the departure of their fiddler, Rémi Pagé. Shortly thereafter, in 2026, the band announced the arrival of Guillaume Beaulieu to replace Rémi on fiddle and foot percussion. May 2026 marked the release of their fourth album, titled Indomptable.

== International Success ==
The group made its international debut at WOMEX 2022 in Lisbon, Portugal. Following this appearance, Le Diable à Cinq increased the number of its European performances, giving an initial series of concerts at various festivals in Spain, England, Latvia, Estonia, and Switzerland. In 2024, the group continued with performances in Ireland, Estonia , and England at the prestigious Trafalgar Square.

In 2025, the quintet performed at the Canadian Pavilion during the 2025 World Expo in Osaka, Japan, giving six show. Later in 2025, the group will perform in Belgium, Germany, Finland, and France. Among their performances are, among others, appearances at the Rudolstadt Festival (90,000 annual visitors) , as well as at the Kaustinen Folk Music Festival, considered the largest folk music and dance festival in the Nordic countries.

== Musical style ==
The band’s musical repertoire consists of original compositions and covers of traditional Quebec songs, infused with pop and rock influences. The band alternates between musical numbers, songs, and call-and-response songs. Le Diable à Cinq is known for its explosive, high-energy stage presence. An evening with them is described as a unifying experience.

== Discographie ==
- 2017 : Sorti de l'enfer (Les Disques Passeport)
- 2019 : Debout! (Les Disques Passeport)
- 2023 : Tempête (Les Disques Passeport)
- 2026 : Indomptable (The Orchard)

== Members ==
- Félix Sabourin: vocals, accordion, podorythmie
- Samuel Sabourin: vocals, tenor banjo, fiddle, mandolin
- Éloi Gagnon-Sabourin: vocals, piano
- Guillaume Beaulieu: vocals, fiddle, podorythmie
- André-Michel Dambremont: vocals, acoustic guitar, bass guitar

== Awards ==
- 2020 : Winner of Ma Première Nomination l'ADISQ for Debout! - Le Diable à Cinq
- 2020 : Nomination at the ADISQ gala for the Félix : Album of the year - traditional for Debout! - Le Diable à Cinq
- 2021 : Winner of prix Jeune Talent at the Culturiades
- 2021 : Nomination at the Canadian Folk Music Awards for traditional album of the year for Debout! - Le Diable à Cinq
- 2021 : Nomination at the Juno Awards in the category album roots traditionnel of the year for Debout! - Le Diable à Cinq
- 2023 : official ambassador for En Petite-Nation
- 2023 : Nomination at the ADISQ gala for the Félix : Album of the year - traditional for Tempête - Le Diable à Cinq
- 2025 : Recognized as one of Radio-Canada Ottawa-Gatineau’s “10 Stars of the Cultural Scene”
