= Tire le coyote =

Canadian folk-rock singer-songwriter

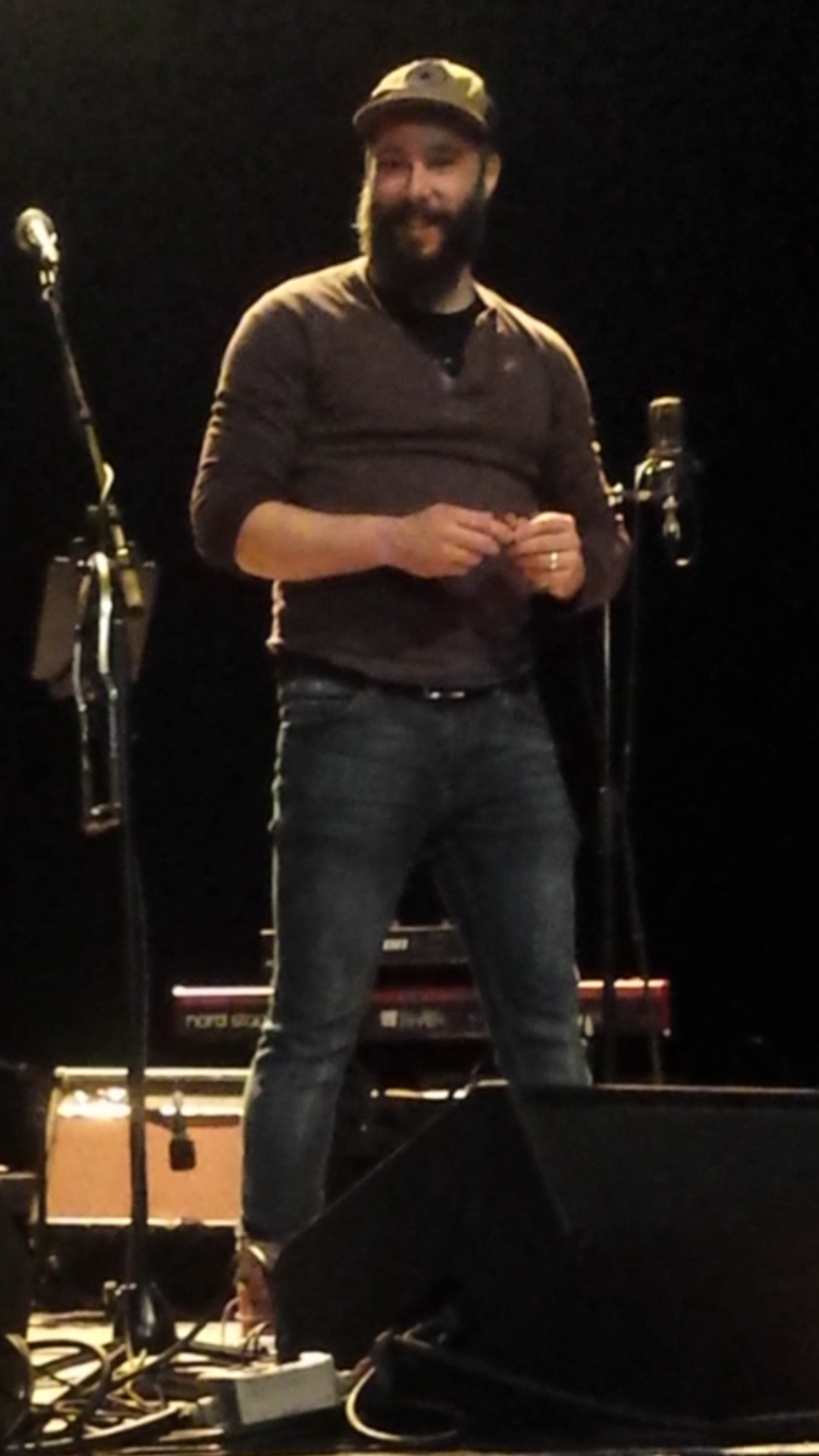

Background information
- Born: Benoît Pinette; 1981 (age 43–44); Sherbrooke, Quebec
- Origin: Sherbrooke, Quebec
- Genres: folk rock
- Occupation: singer-songwriter
- Instruments: vocals, guitar
- Years active: 1998-present

Tire le coyote is the stage name of Benoît Pinette (born 1981 in Sherbrooke, Quebec), a Canadian folk-rock singer-songwriter from Quebec. He is most noted for receiving a Juno Award nomination for Francophone Album of the Year at the Juno Awards of 2019.

Pinette began his career in music with the band Fono Jône, which performed at the Francouvertes and Francofolies de Montréal festivals but broke up before releasing any recordings. He released his solo debut EP in 2009, before following up with the full-length album Le Fleuve en huile in 2011. He followed up with the albums Mitan in 2013 and Panorama in 2015.

He received a Canadian Folk Music Award nomination for French Songwriter of the Year at the 11th Canadian Folk Music Awards, a Prix Félix nomination for Folk Album of the Year, and a SOCAN Songwriting Prize nomination for the song "Jolie Anne".

His fourth album, Désherbage, was released in 2017. In addition to the album's Juno Award nomination, he received two Prix Félix nominations for Songwriter of the Year and Singer-Songwriter Concert Tour of the Year, and a second Canadian Folk Music Award nomination for French Songwriter of the Year at the 14th Canadian Folk Music Awards.

== Discography ==
- EP (2009)
- Le Fleuve en huile (2011)
- Mitan (2013)
- Panorama (2015)
- Désherbage (2017)
- Session acoustique 1 (2019)
- Au premier tour de l'évidence (2022)
