= FouKi =

Canadian rapper

FouKi is the stage name of Léo Fougères, a Canadian rapper from Montreal, Quebec. He is most noted as the winner of the Felix Award for Male Artist of the Year at the 43rd Félix Awards in 2021.

Fougères began his career in music in the mid-2010s, forming the band Ségala with friends and releasing the mixtape Plato Hess before launching his solo career. In addition to his solo albums, he has released the collaborative album Génies en herbe with Koriass, and the non-album singles "Ciel" with Alicia Moffet and "Poutine Sauce" with Nate Husser.

He has been a three-time SOCAN Songwriting Prize nominee, receiving nods in 2019 for "Zaybae", in 2020 for "ZayZay", and in 2021 for "Oui Toi". His album Grignotines de luxe was a Juno Award nominee for Francophone Album of the Year at the Juno Awards of 2022.

At the 44th Félix Awards in 2022, FouKi and Jay Scøtt won the awards for Song of the Year and Video of the Year for the single "Copilote".

== Discography ==
- 2016 - Plato Hess
- 2017 - Extendo
- 2017 - Sour Face Musique
- 2017 - Pré_Zay
- 2018 - Zay
- 2018 - La Zayté
- 2019 - ZayZay
- 2020 - Grignotines de Luxe
- 2020 - Génies en herbe (with Koriass)
- 2023 - Zayon
- 2023 - RAP CLUB
- 2025 - "Still Kankan"
