= Jonathan Painchaud =

Canadian singer-songwriter (born 1974)

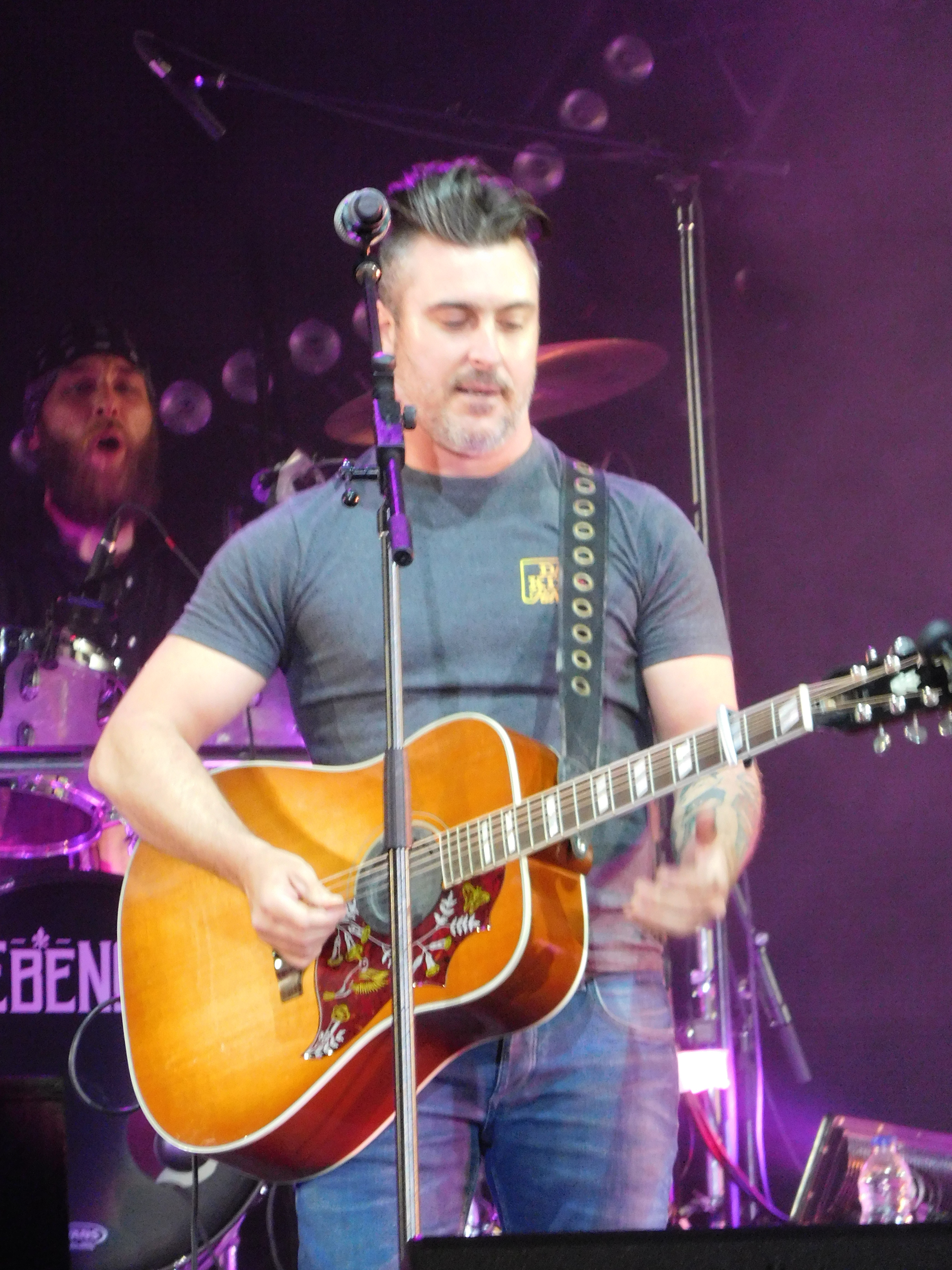

Background information
- Born: Îles de la Madeleine
- Genres: Pop, rock, country
- Occupations: Singer, songwriter
- Label: L-A be
- Website: http://jonathanpainchaud.com

Jonathan Painchaud (born September 17, 1974) is a Canadian singer-songwriter from Iles de la Madeleine, Quebec.

Painchaud is a former member of the group Okoumé. He released a duo album with his brother, Éloi, in 2002, and released four solo albums since then, Qu'on se lève (2007), La dernière des arcades (2010), Mon cœur collé au tien (2013), and La tête haute (2016).

Jonathan and Eloi Painchaud have since formed the band Salebarbes, who have released the albums Live au Pas Perdus (2019) and Gin à l'eau salée (2021), and won the Félix Award for Group of the Year at the 44th Félix Awards in 2022. They won Francophone Artist of the Year at the 2025 Canadian Country Music Association Awards.

== Discography ==
- Au nom du père (Éloi et Jonathan Painchaud, 2002)
1. Mon plus beau rêve
2. Parle, parle
3. Shalala
4. Ranch Flavor
5. Chat noir
6. Que du vent
7. Un
8. Petite symphonie
9. Le soleil se lève encore
10. Berceuse
11. Verre Bouteille
12. C'est fini
13. Louisianne
- C'est la vie (2006)
1. C'est La Vie
2. Maria
3. Perfect Match
4. Comme Un Con
5. Orphelin
6. J'aime une femme
7. 9 décembre
8. Trop Tard
9. Reste Avec Moi
10. Ça Me Rentre Dedans
11. Ma Girl À Moi
12. J'ai Pas Menti
13. Et Toi
- Qu'on se lève (2007)
1. Les vieux chums
2. Qu'on se lève
3. Pousse, pousse
4. Tout simplement
5. Laisse toi pas détruire
6. Au bout des doigts
7. Haschich
8. Le goon
9. Pour mon grand frère
10. Le kid
11. Le méchant
12. Belle ballerine
- La dernière des arcades (2010)
1. Toujours rebelle
2. Si t'es vivant
3. Seul à seul
4. Dans le sang et l'encre
5. Rien à chanter
6. Trou d'eau
7. La dernière des arcades
8. Bruce Lee vs Chuck Norris
9. Les fantômes du passé
10. À genoux
- Mon cœur collé au tien (2013)
1. Fais-toi s'en pas
2. Pour de vrai
3. Edge
4. Menteur
5. Goéland
6. Deloréan
7. Celle-ci
8. Histoire de frère
9. Drôle de temps
10. Clutching at straws
11. Petite poupée
- La tête haute (2016)
1. La tête haute
2. Belle infirmière
3. Me laisser porter par les vents
4. C'était tout juste l'automne
5. Rat Race
6. C'est pas tous les jours dimanche
7. La reine de ma maison
8. Plus que la vie elle-même
9. Le quadrupède pétomane
10. Pour une journée au moins
