= Koriass =

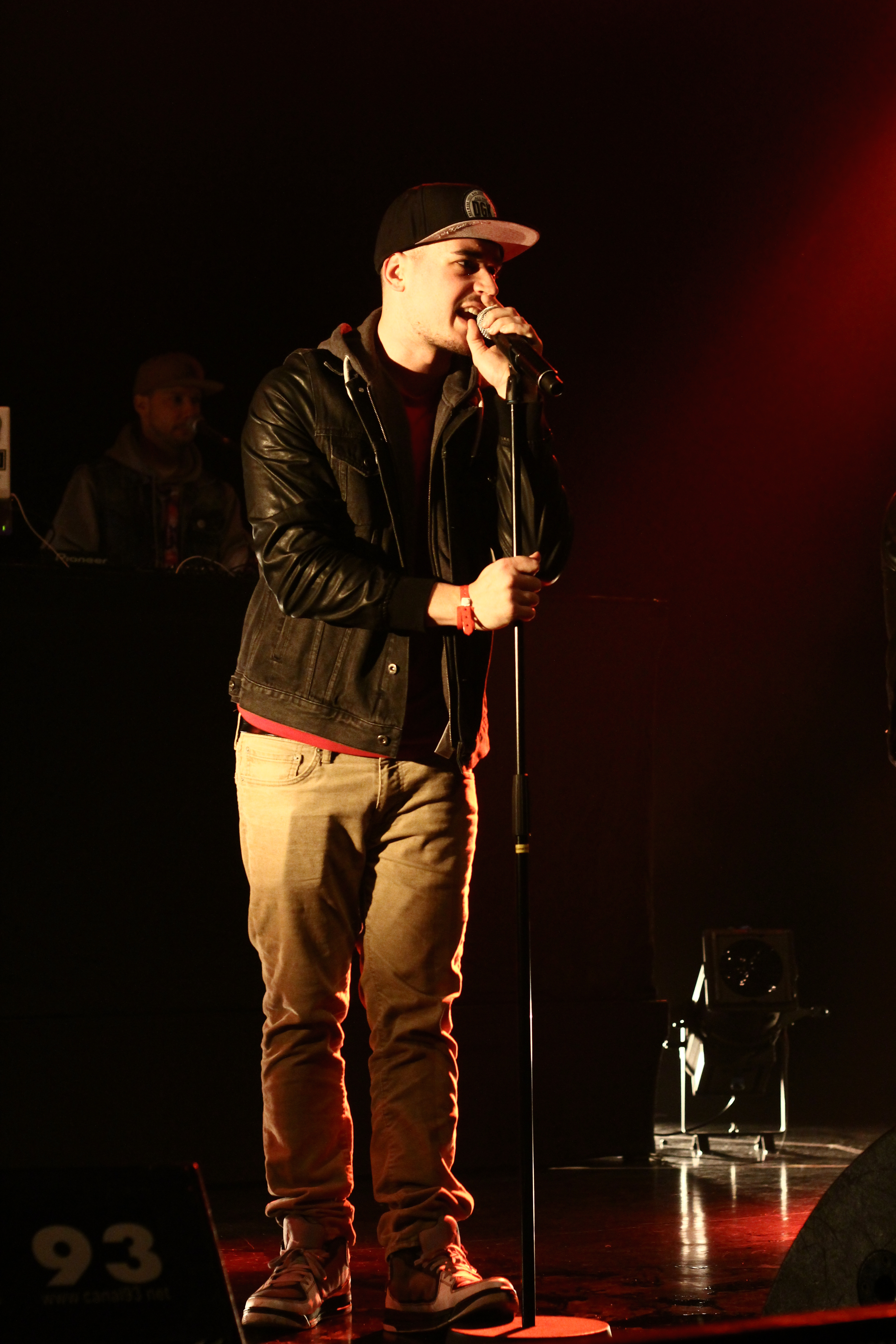

Background information
- Born: Emmanuel Dubois; March 12, 1984 (age 42); Montreal, Quebec, Canada
- Genre: hip hop
- Occupation: rapper
- Instrument: Vocals
- Years active: 2000s-present

Koriass is the stage name of Emmanuel Dubois (born March 12, 1984), a Canadian rapper from Quebec. He is a two-time winner of the Prix Félix for Best Hip Hop Album, in 2014 for Rue des Saules and in 2016 for Love Suprême, was a shortlisted finalist for the Juno Award for Francophone Album of the Year at the Juno Awards of 2017 for Love Suprême, and won the Echo Songwriting Prize in the French division in 2012 for his song "St-Eustache".

He received another Juno Award nomination for Francophone Album of the Year at the Juno Awards of 2020, for his 2019 album La nuit des longs couteaux.

== Discography ==
=== Albums ===
- Les racines dans le béton (2008)
- Petites victoires (2011)
- Rue des Saules (2013)
- Love Suprême (2016)
- La nuit des longs couteaux (2018)
- Génies en herbes (with FouKi, 2020)
- Abri de fortune (pour fin du monde) (2022)

=== EPs ===
- Mort de rire (2006, EP)
- Petit love (2015, EP)
