= Souldia =

Canadian rapper

Souldia is the stage name of Kevin Saint-Laurent, a Canadian rapper from Limoilou, Quebec. He is most noted for his albums Dixque d'art, which won the Félix Award for Rap Album of the Year at the 44th Félix Awards in 2022, and Non conventionnel, which was a Juno Award nominee for Francophone Album of the Year at the Juno Awards of 2024.

== Discography ==
- 2009 - Art kontrol
- 2012 - Les origines du mal
- 2014 - Krime grave
- 2016 - Sacrifice
- 2017 - Ad Vitam Æternam
- 2018 - L'album noir
- 2018 - Survivant
- 2020 - Silence radio
- 2020 - Backstage
- 2021 - Dixque d'art
- 2023 - Non conventionnel
- 2024 - Nouvelle Vie
