= Vincent Vallières =

Canadian singer from Sherbrooke (born 1978)

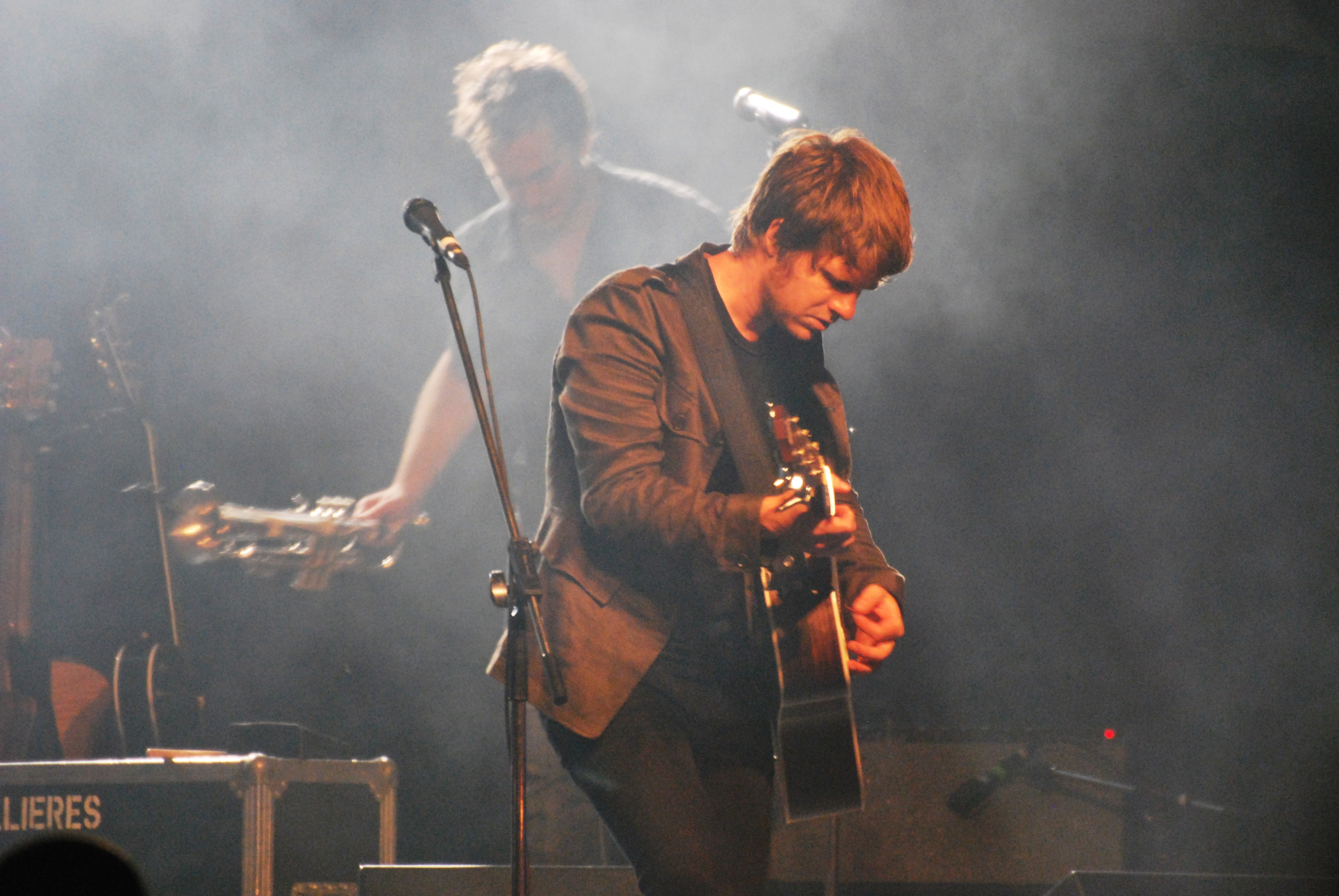
- Vincent Vallières, in Jonquière, July 14, 2011

Background information
- Born: August 8, 1978 (age 48); Sherbrooke, Quebec, Canada
- Genres: Rock; country
- Occupation: Singer
- Instruments: Guitar; harmonica
- Years active: 1996-present
- Website: vincentvallieres.com

Vincent Vallières (French pronunciation: [vɛ̃sɑ̃ valjɛʁ]; born August 8, 1978) is a Canadian singer from Sherbrooke.

== Career ==
Vallières debut album, Trente Arpents, was released in 1999, followed by Bordel Ambiant in 2001 . He became popular in Quebec in 2003 with the release of his third album, Chacun Dans Son Espace. On August 29, 2006, his fourth album, Le Repère Tranquille, was released, with the first single "Je pars à pied" immediately put into the regular rotations of many Québec radio stations. The second single from that album, "Un quart de piasse", also received airplay.

His 2021 album Toute beauté n'est pas perdue was a Juno Award nominee for Francophone Album of the Year at the Juno Awards of 2022.

== Discography ==
=== Albums ===
- Trente arpents, 1999
- Bordel ambiant, 2001
- Chacun dans son espace, 2003
- Le Repère tranquille, 2006
- Le Monde tourne fort, 2009, Gold (Music Canada)
- Fabriquer l'aube, 2013, Gold (Music Canada)
- Le temps des vivants, 2017
- Toute beauté n'est pas perdue, 2021

=== Singles ===
Year	Single	Peak positions	Album
Year	Single	CAN	Album
2011	"On Va S'Aimer Encore"	56	Le Monde Tourne Fort
"—" denotes releases that did not chart

== Prizes and honors ==
- 2005: Prix Félix-Leclerc de la chanson (Québec)
- 2007: Prix Gilles-Vigneault
