= Jay Scott (singer) =

Canadian musician

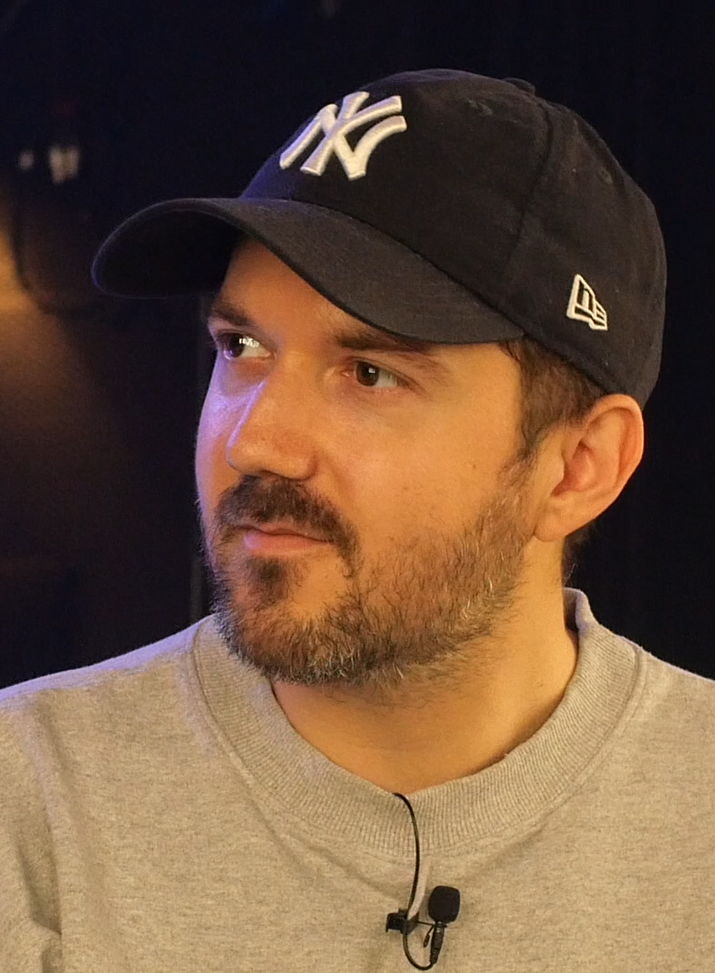
Jay Scott in 2022

Jay Scott (also stylized as Jay Scøtt) is the stage name of Pier-Luc Jean Papineau, a Canadian musician from Terrebonne, Quebec, most noted as a winner of three Félix Awards at the 44th Félix Awards in 2022.

Papineau began his musical career in the early 2010s, performing as a rapper under the stage name PL3. Changing his stage name to Jay Scøtt, he subsequently formed a duo with collaborator Smitty Bacalley, with whom he released the albums Stockholm in 2017 and Un chevreuil in 2018, and competed in the Francouvertes competition in 2018. He also released the solo EP EM0G0D in 2018.

During this time, he also released a number of folk-oriented demos on YouTube and Patreon, breaking through to wider popularity when rapper FouKi released a collaborative remix of Scott's song "Copilote" on his 2020 album Grignotines de luxe. The song became a major radio hit in 2021, and Scott released the album Ses plus grands succès, compiling several of his YouTube and Patreon songs including "Copilote", in late 2021. In 2022 he followed up with Rap Queb Vol. 1, an album of covers of other significant Quebec hip hop songs.

At the 44th Félix Awards "Copilote" was the winner of the awards for Song of the Year and Video of the Year, and Ses plus grands succès won the award for Folk Album of the Year. Scott was also a nominee for Revelation of the Year, and Ses plus grands succès was nominated for Bestselling Album of the Year.
