= Keith Kouna =

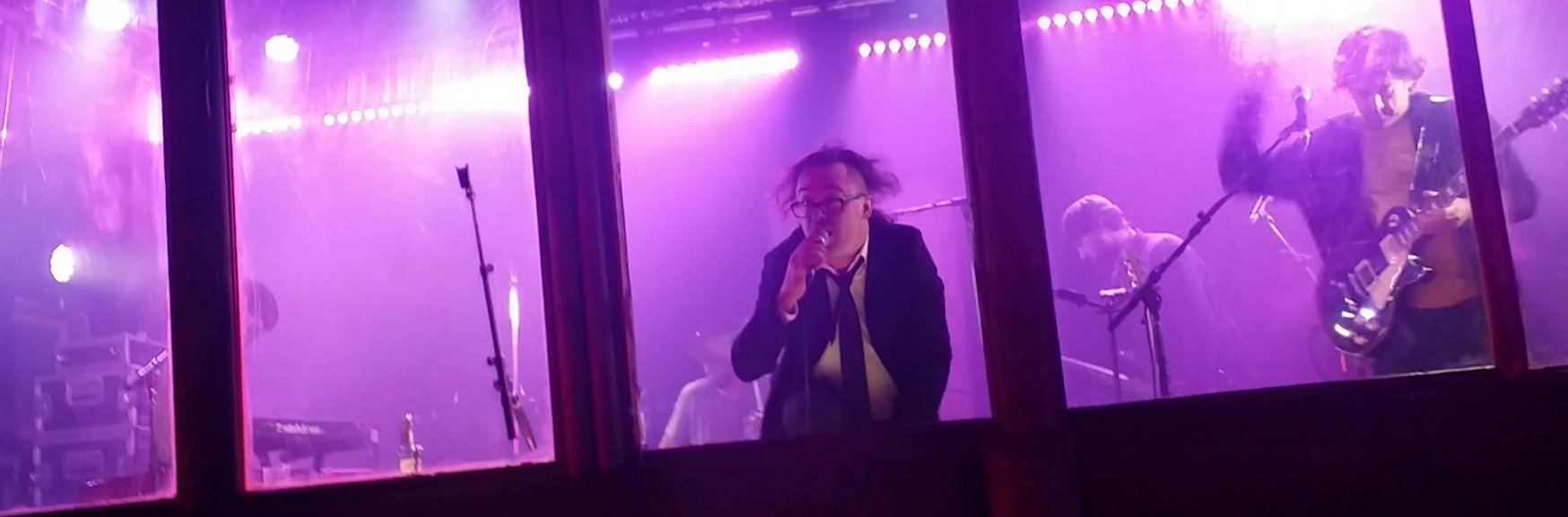

Background information
- Born: Sylvain Côté
- Origin: Saint-Augustin-de-Desmaures, Quebec
- Genres: indie rock, punk rock
- Occupation: singer-songwriter
- Instrument: vocals
- Years active: 2001-present

Keith Kouna is the stage name of Sylvain Côté, a Canadian rock singer and songwriter from Saint-Augustin-de-Desmaures, Quebec. He is most noted for winning the SOCAN Songwriting Prize in the French division for his song "Batiscan" in 2013.

Kouna was first active in music as the lead vocalist for the punk rock band Les Goules. He released his solo debut album Les Années monsieur in 2008, and followed up with Du plaisir et des bombes in 2012. Following his award win for "Batiscan", he released Le voyage d’hiver, an album which reimagined and reinterpreted Franz Schubert's Winterreise.

Les Goules reunited for a new album in 2016. Kouna then released his most recent solo album, Bonsoir shérif, in 2017.
