= Ingrid St-Pierre =

Canadian singer-songwriter (born 1985)

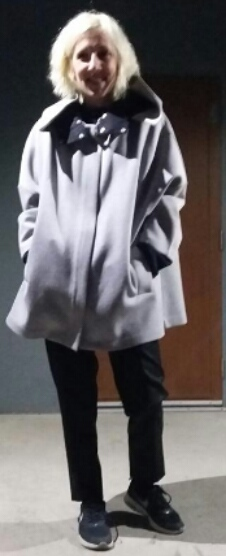
St-Pierre in 2016

Ingrid St-Pierre (born in 1985) is a French Canadian singer-songwriter from Quebec.

== Biography ==
Ingrid St-Pierre was born and raised in Cabano, a town within the Bas-Saint-Laurent region of Quebec, Canada. Her father is a businessman while her mother is a painter and an artist. Since a young age, St-Pierre took piano and Gregorian classical singing classes. At age 17, she left her hometown to go study in Quebec City. She later on settled in Trois-Rivières where she decided to study psychology. Ultimately, she left university to pursue a musical career.

== Musical career ==
She joined independent Canadian record label "La Tribu" in 2011 and still works with them to this day

She released her first album Petite mam'zelle de chemin on May 24, 2011. The album sold relatively well in Quebec and it even won St-Pierre her first nomination for the Breakthrough Award at the ADISQ, the main awards for music in Quebec. St-Pierre was called Francophone discovery by the Public Francophone Radio Association. On January 20, 2012, St-Pierre released a music video for her song "Ficelles" on YouTube, a video on her Grandmother and her struggle with Alzheimer's which now has nearly three million views. In 2012, she released her second album L'Escapade, receiving three ADISQ nominations: album of the year, singer-songwriter of the year and the Contemporary adult award, an award she lost to Celine Dion. After a three-year hiatus for personal reasons, during which St-Pierre suffered a miscarriage in 2014, she released her third album Tokyo in November 2015. St-Pierre, with her partner and drummer, Liu-Kong Ha, had a baby boy on September 9, 2015, who they decided to name Polo. Her son was conceived in Tokyo hence the name she gave to her new album. Later that year, she was nominated once again for the ADISQ Gala and finally won her first Felix for artist of the year. Following her vocality on the subject, The Federation of Quebec Alzheimer's society named St-Pierre their Spokesperson for the Alzheimer's movement.

In 2016, St-Pierre toured in support of her third album Tokyo. She also joined the Canadian celebrity dancing show Les Dieux de la danse with her long-time friend, singer and television host Joël Legendre.

== Discography ==
=== 2011 : Ma petite mam'zelle de chemin ===
1. Mercure au Chrome et p'tits pansements
2. Homéostasie crânienne
3. Colle sur tes papilles
4. Desjardins
5. Les froufrous blancs
6. Les Ex
7. Pates au basilic
8. Sous les Aquarelles
9. Une luciole sur un high
10. T'se
11. Ficelles

=== 2012 : L'escapade ===
1. La chocolaterie
2. La planque a libellules
3. La courte échelle
4. L'escapade
5. Valentine
6. Coin Livernoche
7. Deltaplane
8. En p'tit bonhomme
9. Les elles

=== 2015 : Tokyo ===
1. Tokyo Jelly Bean
2. La ballerine
3. 63 Rue Leman
4. Place Royale
5. La dentellière
6. Lucie
7. Les loups pastel
8. Les aéronefs
9. Monoplace
10. L'éloge des dernières fois

=== 2019 : Petite Plage ===
1. À la mer
2. Les joailliers
3. Les éléphants Massaï
4. Les amoureux scaphandres
5. Les épousailles
6. La vie devant
7. Sac banane
8. La lumineuse (lettre à mon fils)
9. L'enneigée

== Videography ==
- Desjardins (August 11, 2011), Directed by Philippe Arsenault
- Ficelles (January 20, 2012). Directed by Valerie Dupras and Jean-Francois Levesque
- Valentine (March 28, 2013) Directed by Sebastien Gagne
- Feu de Bengale (October 11, 2013) Directed by Sebastien Gagne
- La planque à libellules (December 6, 2013) Jean-Francois Blais
- Tokyo Jellybean (September 21, 2016) Directed by Pierre Alexandre Gerard
