= André-Philippe Gagnon =

Canadian comedian and impressionist

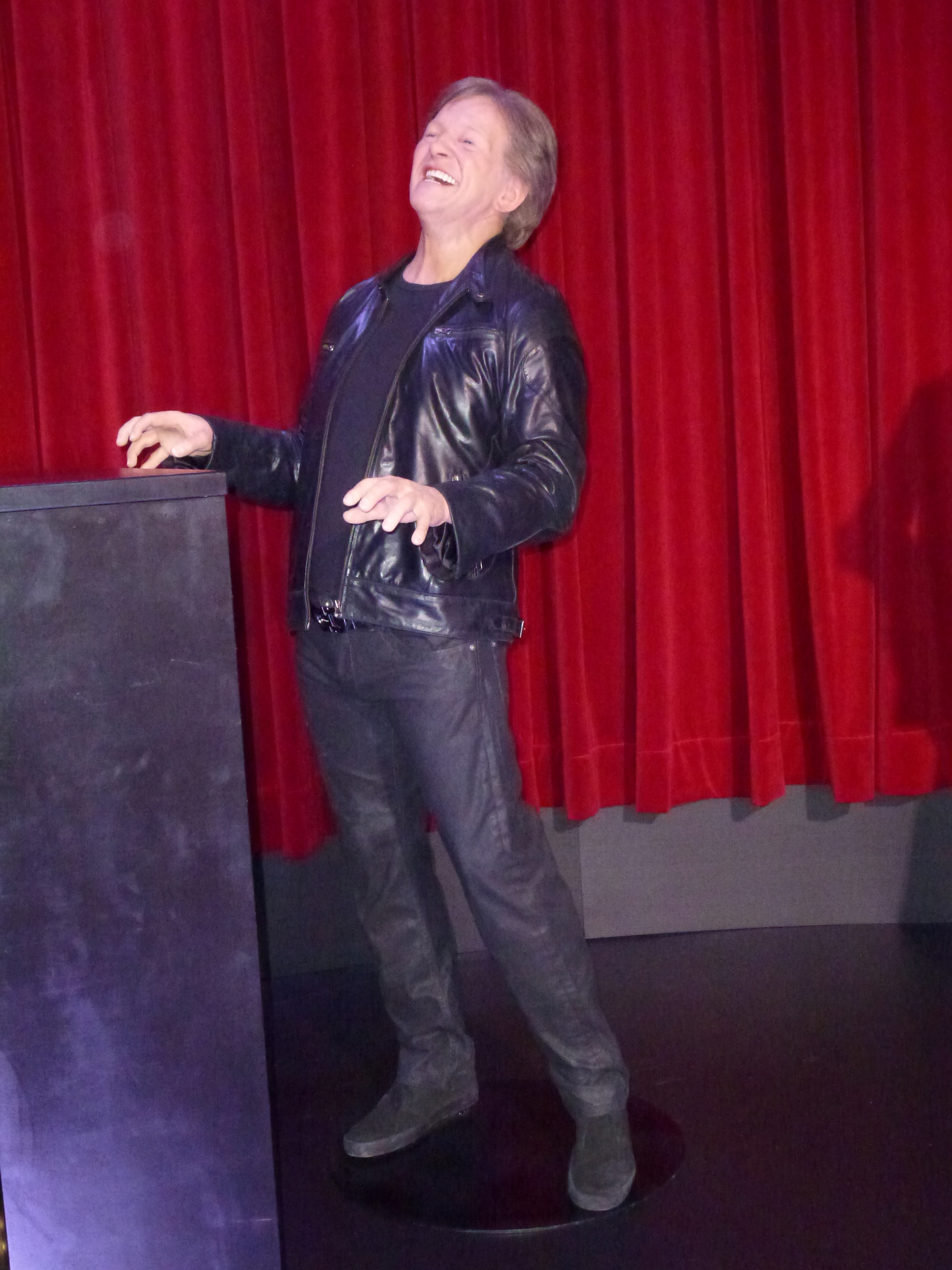
- Gagnon in 2013
- Born: December 17, 1962 (age 62); Loretteville, Quebec, Canada
- Occupation(s): Comedian, impressionist

André-Philippe Gagnon (born December 17, 1962) is a Canadian comedian and impressionist.

His impressionist act is unique for his specialized talent in impersonating the singing voices of celebrities, as opposed to his contemporaries, who typically can do only the speaking voices. He is best known for duplicating "We Are the World".

He gained widespread recognition in North America after a 1985 appearance on The Tonight Show Starring Johnny Carson and went on to play a regular act at The Venetian in Las Vegas and other venues around the world.

== Notable performances ==
- 1989 – SkyDome opening ceremony in Toronto, also broadcast live on the TVA Channel.

== Discography ==
- 1991 L'intégrale [enregistrement sonore] (Distribution Select formerly Distribution Musicor)
