= 2Frères =

Canadian folk rock duo

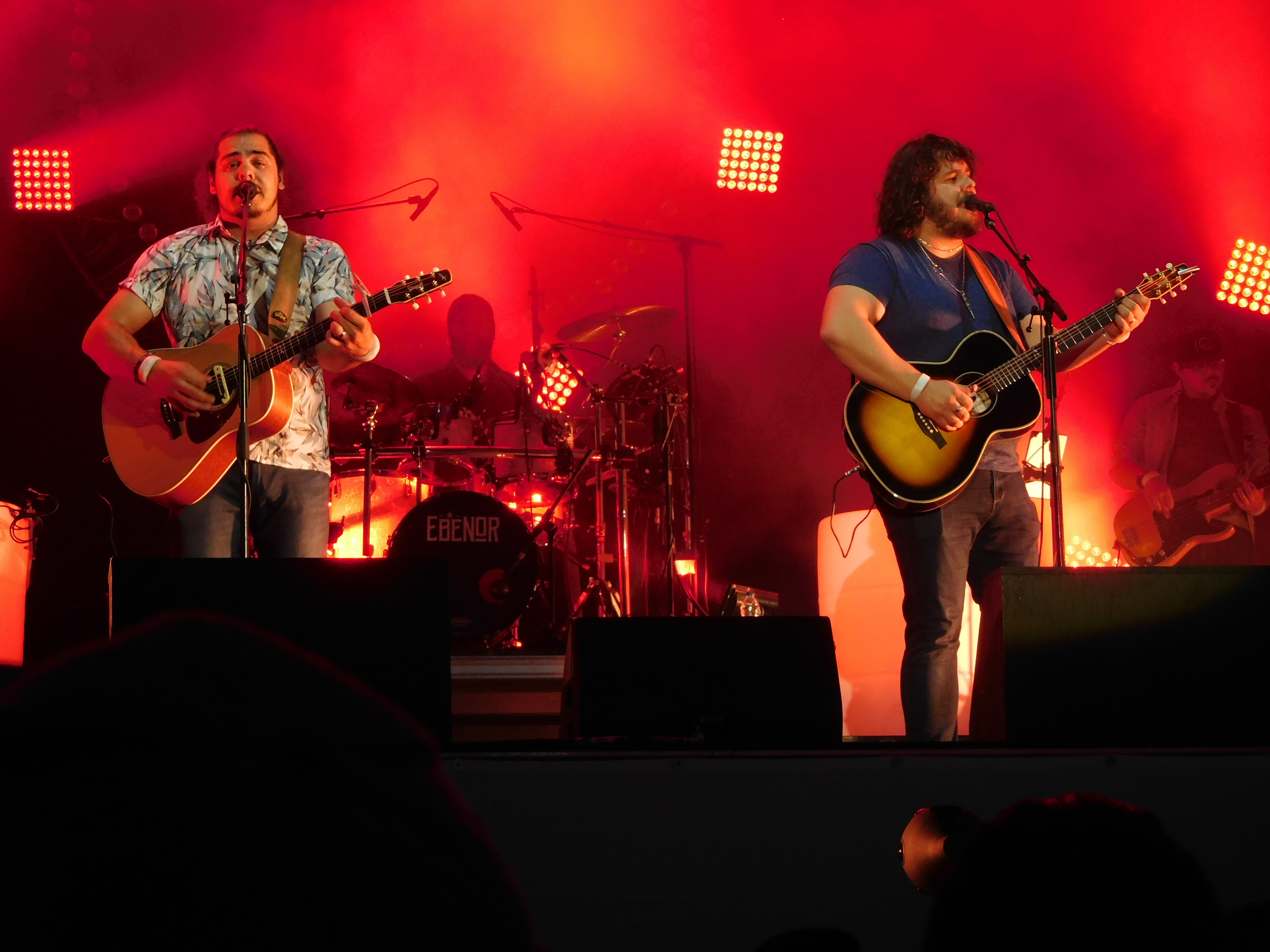

Background information
- Origin: Chapais, Quebec, Canada
- Genres: folk, folk pop poche rock
- Years active: 2008–present
- Labels: MP3 Disques
- Members: Erik Caouette; Sonny Caouette
- Website: https://2freres.com

2Frères is a Canadian folk rock duo from Chapais, Quebec, consisting of brothers Erik and Sonny Caouette. They are most noted as two-time winners of the Félix Award for Group of the Year, winning at the 38th Félix Awards in 2016 and at the 40th Félix Awards in 2018.

== Biography ==
Formed in 2008, they released their debut album Nous autres in April 2015. The album sold 80,000 copies in Quebec and was certified platinum, and the band were the most-played artists of any genre on francophone radio in Canada in 2016. In addition to their Group of the Year win at the Felix Awards in 2016, the album also won Pop Album of the Year.

Their second album, La Route, was released in November 2017. The album's single "Comme avant" spent a record 25 weeks as the most-played song on Quebec radio, and the album was again certified gold.

Their third album, À tous les vents, followed in February 2020. The album debuted at #1 on Quebec's pop charts. With touring impacted by the COVID-19 pandemic in Canada, the album was partially promoted by a documentary special on the duo, 2Frères : L’improbable parcours, which was broadcast by TVA on September 27, 2020, as well as a companion book, 2Frères, À tous les vents : L’histoire d’un improbable parcours, by François Couture.

They received three Felix nominations at the 42nd Félix Awards in 2020, for Group of the Year, Adult Contemporary Album of the Year for À tous les vents, and Song of the Year for the album's title track.

They received two Juno Award nominations at the Juno Awards of 2021, for Breakthrough Group of the Year and Francophone Album of the Year for À tous les vents.

In 2023, they participated in an all-star recording of Serena Ryder's single "What I Wouldn't Do", which was released as a charity single to benefit Kids Help Phone's Feel Out Loud campaign for youth mental health.
