= Patrice Michaud =

Canadian singer-songwriter (born 1980)

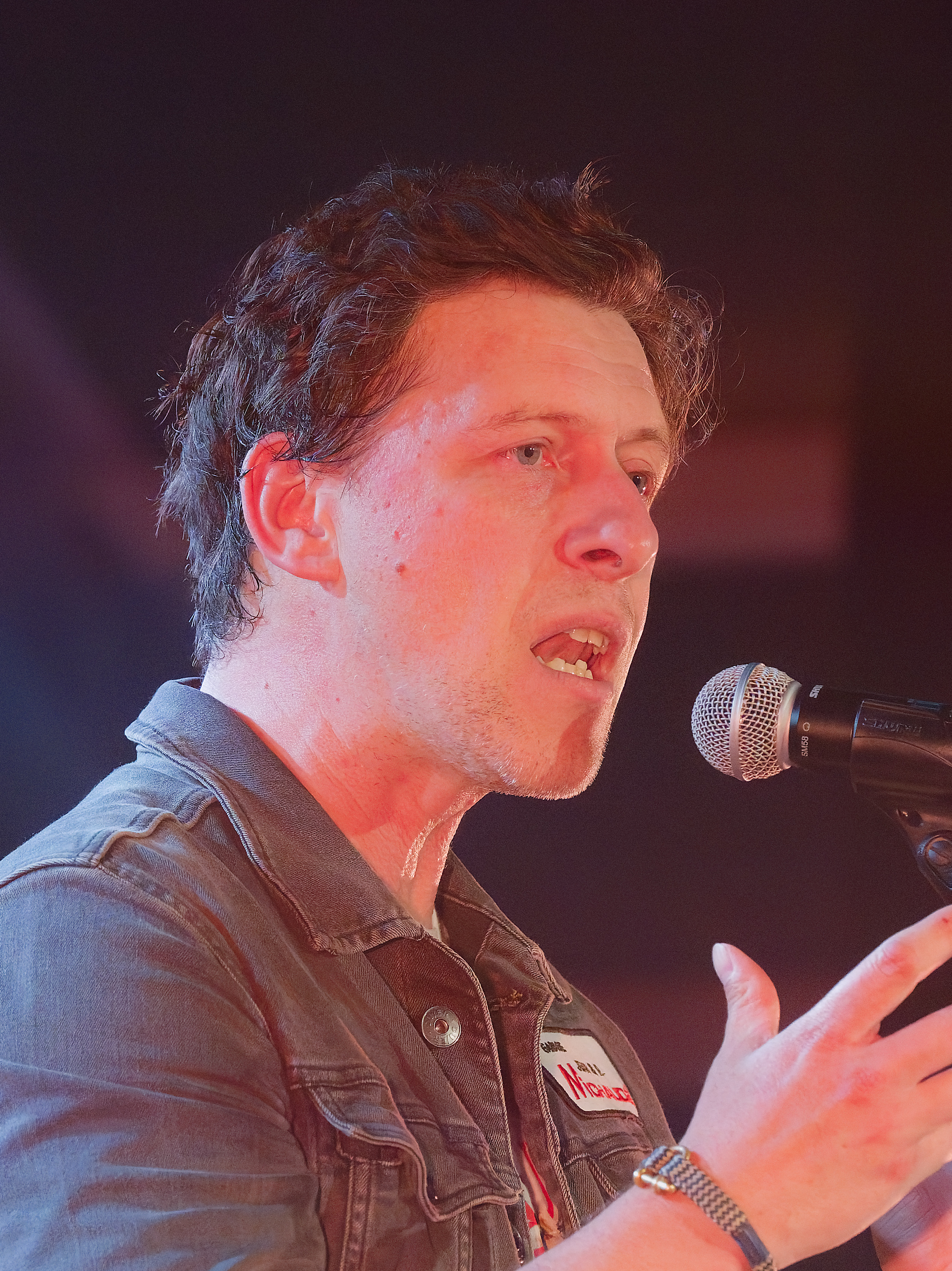
- Patrice Michaud in Petite-Vallée, June 2026

Background information
- Born: November 1, 1980 (age 45); Cap-Chat, Quebec
- Genres: pop rock, folk rock
- Occupation: singer-songwriter
- Instruments: vocals, guitar
- Years active: 2010-present

Patrice Michaud (born November 1, 1980) is a Canadian singer-songwriter from Cap-Chat, Quebec. He won the SOCAN Songwriting Prize in the French division in 2014 for his song "Mécaniques générales", and his 2017 album Almanach was a Juno Award finalist for Francophone Album of the Year at the Juno Awards of 2018.

A graduate of Université Laval, he released his debut album Le Triangle des Bermudes in 2011, and followed up with Le Feu de chaque jour in 2014. In 2015 he won the Prix Félix for Best Concert Performance by a Solo Artist for his tour to support Le Feu de chaque jour.

Almanach, his third album, was released in 2017. In addition to his Juno Award nomination, he won two Prix Félix in 2017, for Male Vocalist of the Year and Song of the Year for "Kamikaze", and was a Canadian Folk Music Award finalist for French Songwriter of the Year at the 13th Canadian Folk Music Awards.

At the Gala de l'ADISQ in 2018, he won the Prix Félix for Male Singer of the Year.

Grand voyage désorganisé, his fourth album, was released in 2021.
