= Félix Award =

Annual Canadian music award in Québec

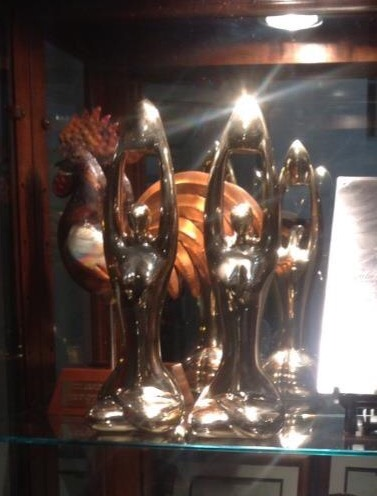
- Two Félix awards on display at Centre des arts Juliette-Lassonde in Saint-Hyacinthe, Quebec
- Awarded for: achievements in Quebec's music, storytelling, and humour industry
- Country: Canada
- Presented by: Association du disque, de l'industrie du spectacle québécois (ADISQ)
- First award: September 23, 1979
- Website: gala.adisq.com

The Félix Award (French: Trophée Félix or Prix Félix) is an award, given by the Association du disque, de l'industrie du spectacle québécois (ADISQ) on an annual basis to artists working in the music, storytelling (conte), and humour industry in the Canadian province of Quebec (in any language) and in the French language in Canada.

== The award ==
The first Félix awards were presented on September 23, 1979. The idea belonged to the first president of ADISQ, Gilles Talbot. The award trophy was created by Marc-André Parisé.

The awards are named in honour of Quebec songwriter Félix Leclerc.

In contrast to the Juno Awards, whose nominations are based partially on record sales, nominations and winners of the Félix are decided by ADISQ members. The awards are given during an annual ceremony "Gala de l'ADISQ". Among the categories are Best-selling album, Best album (in various music genres), Songwriter of the year, Composer of the year, Song of the year, Male/Female singer of the year, Discovery of the year, Show of the year, etc.

The awards have sometimes been controversial. In 1983, songwriter Luc Plamondon attracted controversy by using his acceptance speech to denounce copyright law. In 1991, Céline Dion publicly refused the Félix for anglophone artist of the year for her English-language album Unison, not considering herself an anglophone artist. Instead she suggested to ADISQ to create a new award category for an artist who achieved the most success internationally. The next year such category was indeed created : Most successful artist performing in a language other than French (French: Artiste s’étant le plus illustré dans une autre langue que le français)

== Ceremonies ==
| Ceremony | Date | Hosts |
|---|---|---|
| 1st Felix Awards | September 23, 1979 | Dominique Michel, Denise Filiatrault |
| 2nd Felix Awards | October 5, 1980 | Yvon Deschamps |
| 3rd Felix Awards | October 4, 1981 | Yvon Deschamps |
| 4th Felix Awards | October 3, 1982 | Yvon Deschamps |
| 5th Felix Awards | October 30, 1983 | Yvon Deschamps |
| 6th Felix Awards | October 28, 1984 | Jean-Pierre Ferland |
| 7th Felix Awards | October 27, 1985 | Jean-Guy Moreau |
| 8th Felix Awards | October 26, 1986 | Serge Thériault, Claude Meunier |
| 9th Felix Awards | October 25, 1987 | André-Philippe Gagnon |
| 10th Felix Awards | October 23, 1988 | Denise Filiatrault, Dominique Michel, Yvon Deschamps, Jean-Pierre Ferland, Jean-Guy Moreau, Serge Thériault, Claude Meunier, André-Philippe Gagnon |
| 11th Felix Awards | October 15, 1989 | Michel Rivard |
| 12th Felix Awards | October 21, 1990 | Michel Rivard |
| 13th Felix Awards | October 14, 1991 | René Simard |
| 14th Felix Awards | October 18, 1992 | René Simard |
| 15th Felix Awards | October 17, 1993 | Yvon Deschamps |
| 16th Felix Awards | October 16, 1994 | Yvon Deschamps |
| 17th Felix Awards | November 5, 1995 | Patrick Huard |
| 18th Felix Awards | November 3, 1996 | Yvon Deschamps |
| 19th Felix Awards | October 26, 1997 | Yvon Deschamps |
| 20th Felix Awards | November 1, 1998 | Céline Dion, René Simard, Jean-Pierre Ferland, André-Philippe Gagnon |
| 21st Felix Awards | October 31, 1999 | Véronique Cloutier |
| 22nd Felix Awards | November 4, 2000 | Guy A. Lepage |
| 23rd Felix Awards | October 28, 2001 | Guy A. Lepage |
| 24th Felix Awards | October 27, 2002 | Guy A. Lepage |
| 25th Felix Awards | October 26, 2003 | Guy A. Lepage |
| 26th Felix Awards | October 31, 2004 | Guy A. Lepage |
| 27th Felix Awards | October 30, 2005 | Michel Rivard |
| 28th Felix Awards | October 29, 2006 | Louis-José Houde |
| 29th Felix Awards | October 28, 2007 | Louis-José Houde |
| 30th Felix Awards | November 2, 2008 | Louis-José Houde |
| 31st Felix Awards | November 1, 2009 | Louis-José Houde |
| 32nd Felix Awards | November 7, 2010 | Louis-José Houde |
| 33rd Felix Awards | October 30, 2011 | Louis-José Houde |
| 34th Felix Awards | October 28, 2012 | Louis-José Houde |
| 35th Felix Awards | October 27, 2013 | Louis-José Houde |
| 36th Felix Awards | October 26, 2014 | Louis-José Houde |
| 37th Felix Awards | November 8, 2015 | Louis-José Houde |
| 38th Felix Awards | October 30, 2016 | Louis-José Houde |
| 39th Felix Awards | October 29, 2017 | Louis-José Houde |
| 40th Felix Awards | October 28, 2018 | Louis-José Houde |
| 41st Félix Awards | October 27, 2019 | Louis-José Houde |
| 42nd Félix Awards | November 1, 2020 | Louis-José Houde |
| 43rd Félix Awards | November 7, 2021 | Louis-José Houde |
| 44th Félix Awards | November 6, 2022 | Louis-José Houde |
| 45th Félix Awards | November 5, 2023 | Louis-José Houde |
| 46th Félix Awards | November 3, 2024 | Pierre-Yves Roy-Desmarais |
| 47th Félix Awards | November 9, 2025 | Pierre-Yves Roy-Desmarais |

== Partial list of recipients ==
- April Wine
- Beau Dommage
- Charlotte Cardin
- Daniel Bélanger
- Bleu Jeans Bleu
- La Bottine Souriante
- Daniel Boucher
- Isabelle Boulay
- Lara Fabian
- Gerry Boulet
- Édith Butler
- Marie Carmen
- Robert Charlebois
- Cœur de pirate
- Jim Corcoran
- Sylvain Cossette
- Les Cowboys Fringants
- Richard Desjardins
- Céline Dion
- Diane Dufresne
- Jean-Pierre Ferland
- André Gagnon
- Garolou
- Garou
- Corey Hart
- Laurence Jalbert
- Pierre Lapointe
- Daniel Lavoie
- Jean Leloup
- Hubert Lenoir
- Loco Locass
- Loud
- Marjo
- Patrice Michaud
- Gaston Miron
- Ariane Moffatt
- Kevin Parent
- Bruno Pelletier
- Marie Denise Pelletier
- Paul Piché
- Michel Rivard
- Richard Séguin
- Martine St-Clair
- Diane Tell
- Fabienne Thibeault
- Marie-Chantal Toupin
- Uzeb
- Roch Voisine
- Andrée Watters

== See also ==
- List of Quebec musicians
- Music of Quebec
- Culture of Quebec
