= Innu music =

Music of the Innu First Nation, Canada

The Innu are among the First Nations of Canada. They have maintained a vibrant folk music culture, especially involving dance and percussion-based music. Philip Mackenzie is an especially important modern musician, known for being the creator a kind of singer-songwriter tradition using the Innu language. Though he originally used only guitar and teueikan (a Montagnais frame drum with snares), subsequent performers in his folk Innu style have added electronic and acoustic instruments.

The Innu Nikamu (The Innu Sings), held annually in Quebec, is an important festival of Native American music of all kinds. The most famous Innu folk-rock band, Kashtin, began their popular career at Innu Nikamu. The festival is profiled in the 2017 documentary film Innu Nikamu: Resist and Sing (Innu Nikamu: Chanter la résistance).

Notable Innu musicians include Natasha Kanapé Fontaine, Kanen, Matiu, Claude McKenzie, Geneviève McKenzie-Sioui, Scott-Pien Picard, Shauit and Florent Vollant.
