= 41st Félix Awards =

2019 Canadian music award ceremony

- Date: October 27, 2019
- Hosted by: Louis-José Houde

Television/radio coverage
- Network: SRC

The 41st Félix Awards were held on October 27, 2019, to honour achievements in Quebec music. The gala ceremony was hosted by Louis-José Houde, and televised by Ici Radio-Canada Télé.

Nominees were announced in September.

== Nominees and winners ==
Male Artist of the Year	Female Artist of the Year
Loud; Marc Dupré; Éric Lapointe; Hubert Lenoir; Fred Pellerin	Cœur de pirate; Lara Fabian; Marie-Mai; Ariane Moffatt; Ginette Reno
Group of the Year	Revelation of the Year
Bleu Jeans Bleu; 2Frères; Alaclair Ensemble; Les Cowboys Fringants; Les Trois Accords	Alexandra Stréliski; Lou-Adriane Cassidy; Jérôme 50; Les Louanges; Sarahmée
Song of the Year	Songwriter of the Year
Roxane Bruneau, "Des p'tits bouts de toi"; 2Frères, "Léo Gagné"; Charlotte Cardin and CRi, "Fous n'importe où"; Cœur de pirate and Loud, "Dans la nuit"; Corneille, "Tout le monde"; Marc Dupré, "La tempête"; Les Louanges, "Pitou"; Loud, "Fallait y aller"; Ginette Reno, Diane Dufresne, Céline Dion, Isabelle Boulay, Luce Dufault, Louise Forestier, Laurence Jalbert, Catherine Major, Ariane Moffatt, Marie Denise Pelletier and Marie-Élaine Thibert, "Tu trouveras la paix (pour Renée Claude)"; Les Trois Accords, "Ouvre tes yeux, Simon !"	Alexandra Stréliski, Inscape; Koriass and FouKi, La nuit des longs couteaux (Koriass); Salomé Leclerc, Les choses extérieures; Ariane Moffatt, Petites mains précieuses; Vincent Roberge, Félix Petit and Simon Saint Hillier, La nuit est une panthère (Les Louanges)
Indigenous Artist of the Year	Adult Contemporary Album of the Year
Florent Vollant; Elisapie; Maten; Matiu; Shauit	Ginette Reno, À jamais; Lou-Adriane Cassidy, C'est la fin du monde à tous les jours; Robert Charlebois, Et voilà; Michel Rivard, L'origine de mes espèces; Ingrid St-Pierre, Petite plage
Alternative Album of the Year	Anglophone Album of the Year
Les Louanges, La nuit est une panthère; Choses Sauvages, Choses Sauvages; Jérôme 50, La hiérarchill; Salomé Leclerc, Les choses extérieures; Qualité Motel, C’est pas la qualité qui compte	Jesse Mac Cormack, Now; The Brooks, Freewheelin’Walking; Marie Davidson, Working Class Woman; Alex Henry Foster, Windows in the Sky; Matt Lang, Matt Lang
Bestselling Album of the Year	Classical Album of the Year, Orchestra or Large Ensemble
Ginette Reno, À jamais; Éric Lapointe, Délivrance; Fred Pellerin, Après; Souldia, Survivant; Alexandra Stréliski, Inscape	Montreal Symphony Orchestra with Charles Richard-Hamelin and Kent Nagano, Chopin : Concertos nos 1 et 2; Ensemble contemporain de MTL with Véronique Lacroix, Ana Sokolovic : Sirènes; Orchestre Métropolitain with Yannick Nézet-Séguin, Sibelius 1; Orchestre Métropolitain with Jean-Philippe Sylvestre and Alain Trudel, Mathieu : Concerto no 4 en mi mineur – Rachmaninov : Rhapsodie sur un thème de Paganini, op. 43; Various Artists, Requiem
Classical Album of the Year, Solo or Small Ensemble	Country Album of the Year
Andrew Wan and Charles Richard-Hamelin, Beethoven : Sonates pour violon et piano no. 6, 7 et 8; Soloists of the Montreal Symphony Orchestra, Schubert : Octuor en fa majeur, D. 803; Les Voix humaines with Nigel North, John Dowland : Lachrimae; Philippe Sly and Le Chimera Project, Schubert : Winterreise; Various Artists, Gabriel Fauré : Intégrale des mélodies pour voix et piano	Paul Daraîche, Ma maison favorite; Pascal Allard, Pascal Allard; La Famille Day, Quand on s'est rencountry; Karo Laurendeau, La fureur de vivre; Renée Martel, Arrière-saison
Critic's Choice Album of the Year	Electronic Album of the Year
Les Louanges, La nuit est une panthère; Alaclair Ensemble, Le sens des paroles; FouKi, ZayZay; Salomé Leclerc, Les choses extérieures; Alexandra Stréliski, Inscape; Les Trois Accords, Beaucoup de plaisir	Millimetrik, Make It Last Forever; Das Mörtal, Hotline Miami II EP (Deluxe Edition); Marie Davidson, Working Class Woman (Instrumentals); Ouri, Superficial
Folk Album of the Year	Instrumental Album of the Year
Fred Pellerin, Après; Guillaume Beauregard, Disparition; David Marin, Hélas Vegas; Safia Nolin, Dans le noir; Richard Séguin, Retour à Walden, Richard Séguin sur les pas de Thoreau	Alexandra Stréliski, Inscape; Philippe Brault, La disparition des lucioles; Flying Hórses, Reverie; Sef Lemelin, Déconstruction; Julie Thériault, Projections
Interpretive Album of the Year	Jazz Album of the Year
Varions Artists, La Renarde, sur les traces de Pauline Julien; Various Artists, La Voix 2019; Various Artists, Serge Fiori, Seul Ensemble; Les Prêtres, Quand les hommes vivront d'amour; Guylaine Tanguay, Que les fêtes commencent !	Dominique Fils-Aimé, Stay Tuned!; James Gelfand Trio, Ground Midnight; Jazzlab Orchestra, Quintessence; Josh Rager, Dreams and Other Stories; Rafael Zaldivar, Consecration
Other Language Album of the Year	Pop Album of the Year
Elisapie, The Ballad of the Runaway Girl; Nomadic Massive, MIWA EP; Scott-Pien Picard, Scott-Pien Picard; Pilou, La vraie nature – Chansons par Pilou; Florent Vollant, Mishta Meshkenu	Cœur de pirate, En cas de tempête, ce jardin sera fermé; Bleu Jeans Bleu, Perfecto; Lara Fabian, Papillon; Marie-Mai, Elle et moi; Ariane Moffatt, Petites mains précieuses
Rap Album of the Year	Rock Album of the Year
Alaclair Ensemble, Le sens des paroles; FouKi, ZayZay; Koriass, La nuit des longs couteaux; Loud, Tout ça pour ça; Souldia, Survivant	Éric Lapointe, Délivrance; Caravane, Supernova; Les Hôtesses d'Hilaire, Viens avec moi; Pierre Lapointe et les Beaux Sans-Cœur, Ton corps est déjà froid; Les Trois Accords, Beaucoup de plaisir
Traditional Album of the Year	World Music Album of the Year
Le Vent du Nord and De Temps Antan, Notre album solo; Les Grands Hurleurs, Chouïa; Sophie & Fiachra and André Marchand, Portraits; Le Vent du Nord, Territoires; Yves Lambert Trio, Tentation	Wesli, Rapadou Kreyol; Ayrad, Zoubida; King Abid, Emerikia; Le Winston Band, Zig Zag Zydeco Zoo; Roberto López, Kaleido Stropico
Youth Album of the Year	Anglophone Concert Tour of the Year
Various Artists, La Course des tuques; Kattam, Kattam et ses Tam-Tams; Nicolas Noël, Les livres des enfants du monde; Marie Paquin, Berceuses sous la hotte; Les Petites Tounes, Dans l'Univers	Milk & Bone, Deception Bay; Sylvain Cossette, La tournée 80s; Elliot Maginot, Comrades; Jordan Officer, Three Rivers; Various Artists, Britishow
Comedy Concert Tour of the Year	Interpretive Concert Tour of the Year
Simon Leblanc, Malade; Virginie Fortin, Du bruit dans le cosmos; Martin Matte, Eh la la !; P-A Méthot, Faire le beau; André Sauvé, Ça	Various Artists, La Renarde, sur les traces de Pauline Julien; Brigitte Boisjoli, Signé Plamondon; Marie-Michèle Desrosiers, Marie-Élaine Thibert, Luce Dufault and Martine St-Clair, Entre vous et nous; Various Artists, Les Choristes; Various Artists, Notre-Dame de Paris
Singer-Songwriter Concert Tour of the Year	Video of the Year
Michel Rivard, L'origine de nos espèces; Dumas, Nos idéaux; Marc Dupré, Rester forts; Hubert Lenoir, Darlène; Loud, Une année record	Alaclair Ensemble, "La famille"; Koriass, "Cinq à sept"; Les Louanges, "La nuit est une panthère"; Ariane Moffatt, "Pour toi"; Seba et Horg, "Magasin à 1$"; Les Sœurs Boulay, "Nous après nous"
Most Successful Artist Outside Quebec	Most Successful International Francophone Artist Quebec
Hubert Lenoir; Cœur de pirate; Elisapie; Loud; Alexandra Stréliski	Christophe Maé; Patrick Bruel; Petula Clark; Julien Clerc; Zaz
Félix Hommage
Francine Chaloult
