= 43rd Félix Awards =

2021 Canadian music award ceremony

- Date: November 7, 2021
- Hosted by: Louis-José Houde

Television/radio coverage
- Network: SRC

The 43rd Félix Awards were held on November 7, 2021 to honour achievements in Quebec music. The gala ceremony was hosted by Louis-José Houde, and televised by Ici Radio-Canada Télé.

== Nominees and winners ==
Male Artist of the Year	Female Artist of the Year
FouKi; Louis-Jean Cormier; Pierre Lapointe; Damien Robitaille; Vincent Vallières	Roxane Bruneau; Cœur de pirate; Ariane Moffatt; Klô Pelgag; Guylaine Tanguay
Group of the Year	Revelation of the Year
Les Cowboys Fringants; 2Frères; Bleu Jeans Bleu; Comment Debord; Corridor	CRi; Alex Burger; Comment Debord; Léa Jarry; Thierry Larose
Song of the Year	Songwriter of the Year
Roxane Bruneau, "À ma manière"; 2Frères, "Faut qu'j'y aille"; Ludovick Bourgeois, "Figé dans le temps"; Cœur de pirate, "T'es belle"; Les Cowboys Fringants, "Sur mon épaule"; Marc Dupré, "Où sera le monde?"; FouKi feat. Alicia Moffet, "Ciel"; Jérôme 50, "Tokébakicitte"; Sarahmée, "Le cœur a ses raisons"; Vincent Vallières, "Homme de rien"	Klô Pelgag, Notre-Dame-des-Sept-Douleurs; Antoine Corriveau, Pissenlit; Louis-Jean Cormier and Daniel Beaumont, Le ciel est au plancher; Ariane Moffatt, Incarnat; Vincent Vallières, Toute beauté n'est pas perdue
Indigenous Artist of the Year	Adult Contemporary Album of the Year
Anachnid; Kanen; Matiu; Scott-Pien Picard; Q052	Louis-Jean Cormier, Le ciel est au plancher; Belle Grand Fille, Nos maisons; Pierre Lapointe, Chansons hivernales; Andréanne A. Malette, SITKA; Ariane Moffatt, Incarnat
Alternative Album of the Year	Anglophone Album of the Year
Klô Pelgag, Notre-Dame-des-Sept-Douleurs; Abelaïd, Les cœurs du mal; Comment Debord, Comment Debord; Laurence-Anne, Musivision; Robert Robert, Silicone Villeray	Charlotte Cardin, Phoenix; Helena Deland, Someone New; Dominique Fils-Aimé, Three Little Words; Half Moon Run, Seasons of Change; Suuns, Fiction
Bestselling Album of the Year	Classical Album of the Year, Solo or Small Ensemble
Roxane Bruneau, Acrophobie; 2Frères, À tous les vents; FouKi, Grignotines de Luxe; Harmonium with the Montreal Symphony Orchestra, Histoires sans paroles - Harmonium symphonique; Koriass and FouKi, Génies en herbe	Charles Richard-Hamelin and Andrew Wan, Beethoven - Intégrale des Sonates pour violon et piano Vol. 2: Nos 1, 2, 3, 5; Mathieu Gaudet, Schubert - Intégrale des sonates et œuvres majeures pour piano, Vol. 3; Nadia Labrie, Antoine Bareil, Isaac Chalk and Benoît Loiselle, Flûte Passion: Mozart; Myriam Leblanc with Ensemble Mirabilia, Vivaldi: Luce e Ombra; Charles Richard-Hamelin, Chopin: 24 Préludes - Andante Spianato & Grande Polonaise
Country Album of the Year	Critic's Choice Album of the Year
Alex Burger, Sweet Montérégie; Irvin Blais, Léda; Émilie Daraîche, Émilie Daraîche; Léa Jarry, L'heure d'été; Pat Groulx et les bas blancs, Besoin de rien	Klô Pelgag, Notre-Dame-des-Sept-Douleurs; Louis-Jean Cormier, Le ciel est au plancher; Antoine Corriveau, Pissenlit; Ariane Moffatt, Incarnat; Vincent Vallières, Toute beauté n'est pas perdue
Electronic Album of the Year	Folk Album of the Year
CRi, Juvenile; 10after10, The Boxer Rebellion; Das Mörtal, Miami Beach Witches; DJ UNPIER, Gawteries; Totalement Sublime, Totalement Sublime	Vincent Vallières, Toute beauté n'est pas perdue; Philémon Cimon, Philédouche; Jimmy Hunt, Le Silence; Rick et les Bons Moments, Rick et les Bons Moments; Rosier, Légèrement
Instrumental Album of the Year	Interpretive Album of the Year
Daniel Bélanger, Travelling; Viviane Audet, Les filles montagnes; Cœur de pirate, Perséides; Alain Lefèvre, Opus 7 Préludes; Louis-Étienne Santais, Reflection 1	Harmonium with the Montreal Symphony Orchestra, Histoires sans paroles - Harmonium symphonique; Ludovick Bourgeois, Bedroom Sessions; Half Moon Run, The Covideo Sessions; The Franklin Electric, Never Look Back; Guylaine Tanguay, Country
Jazz Album of the Year	Other Language Album of the Year
Jordan Officer, Jazz Vol. 1; François Bourassa, L'Impact du silence; Simon Denizart, Nomad; Misc, Partager l'ambulance; Christine Tassan Quintette, Voyage intérieur	Marie Davidson & L'Œil Nu, Renegade Breakdown; Alex McMahon, Expat Vol. 1; Justine Quetzal, Breath of Healing; Wake Island, Born to Leave
Pop Album of the Year	Rap Album of the Year
Roxane Bruneau, Acrophobie; Kinkead, Migration; Le Couleur, Concorde; Gab Paquet, La force d'Éros; Peter Peter, Super Comédie	Connaisseur Ticaso, Normal de l'Est; FouKi, Grignotines de Luxe; Imposs, ElevaZIIION (Société distincte); KNLO, CLUB Mixtape 2020; Koriass and FouKi, Génies en herbe
Rock Album of the Year	Traditional Album of the Year
Les Cowboys Fringants, Les Nuits de Repentigny; Daniel Boucher, À grands coups de tounes vol. 1; Antoine Corriveau, Pissenlit; Dance Laury Dance, C'est ça; Thierry Larose, Cantalou	Bon Débarras, Repères; Benoît et Colin, Benoît et Colin; Nicolas Boulerice, Maison de Pierres, Nicolas Boulerice; Duo Beaudry-Prud'homme, Chansons en noires et blanches; Dâvi Simard, Violoneux
World Music Album of the Year	Youth Album of the Year
Ramon Chicharron, Pescador de Sueños; Nazih Borish, Roots of Strings; Élage Diouf, Wutiko; Gypsy Kumbia Orchestra, VelkomBak; Paul Kunigis, Yallah	Ari Cui Cui, Les chansons fabricolées de la télé (Saisons 1 et 2); Brimbelle, Brimbelle sur le chemin des saveurs; Maria Cannelloni, Joyeux flocons; PARADOXUS - le théâtre musical
Anglophone Concert of the Year	Francophone Concert of the Year
Charlotte Cardin, The Phoenix Experience; Anachnid, Dreamweaver; Pierre Kwenders, Pierre Kwenders @ Festival de Jazz; The Barr Brothers, Sleeping Operator; Tocadéo, Chez-vous	Klô Pelgag, VIVRE : Le Spectacle spectral; 2Frères, À tous les vents; Koriass and FouKi, Génies en herbe; Les Cowboys Fringants, L'Amérique pleure; Damien Robitaille, Dé-Confiné
Comedy Concert of the Year	International Collaboration of the Year
Yvon Deschamps, Bon 85e Yvon!; Rachid Badouri, Nous pour vous; Michel Barrette, Mes Drôles de Noëls; Luc Langevin, Interconnectés; Pierre-Yves Roy-Desmarais, Le Grand Live	Klô Pelgag and Pomme, "Sorcières Gagnantes"; Anachnid with R.O., Konoba, Kenny Verreault and Gabriel Moar, "Vent du nord"; Pierre Kwenders and Clément Bazin, "Classe Tendresse"; Pierre Lapointe and Mika, "Six heures d'avion nous séparent"; Eli Rose and Kemmler, "Loin de toi"; Zach Zoya with Angel, "Patience"
Most Successful Artist Outside Quebec	Most Successful Artist On the Web
Charlotte Cardin; Basia Bulat; Pierre Lapointe; Klô Pelgag; Plants and Animals	Damien Robitaille; Gab Bouchard; Louis-Jean Cormier; Florence K; FouKi; Half Moon Run; Les Cowboys Fringants; Jesse Mac Cormack; Montreal Symphony Orchestra; QW4RTZ
Video of the Year	
Klô Pelgag, "Mélamine"; KNLO, "Plafond"; Les Louanges, "Pigeons"; Catherine Major, La panique; Ariane Roy, "Ta main"
