= Innu Nikamu =

Innu Nikamu is an annual music festival, staged in the Innu community of Mani-Utenam near Sept-Îles, Quebec. Launched in 1985 by a community group that included musician Florent Vollant of the prominent local band Kashtin, the festival programs an annual lineup of Indigenous Canadian music and culture, staged on the grounds of the former Sept-Îles residential school.

In a bid to expand the event's public visibility beyond First Nations communities, in the 2010s the festival began inviting selected mainstream recording artists to perform on the festival bill, while retaining indigenous music as its principal focus.

Artists at the 2023 festival included Vollant, Gipsy Kings, Roxane Bruneau, Beatrice Deer, Petapan, Richard Séguin, Loud, Natasha Kanapé Fontaine, Émile Bilodeau, Maten, Aysanabee, Meshikamau, Claude McKenzie, Souldia, Neon Dreams and Bill St-Onge. The festival also launched a marketing campaign to promote the 2023 event in the major markets of Montreal, Quebec City and Trois-Rivières.

The festival was profiled in the 2017 documentary film Innu Nikamu: Resist and Sing (Innu Nikamu: Chanter la résistance). The film was directed by Kevin Bacon-Hervieux, the festival's former artistic director.
