= Akua Tuta =

Studio album by Kashtin
- Released: 1994
- Genres: folk, First Nations
- Label: Groupe Concept/Columbia
- Producers: Kashtin, Toby Gendron with participation of Rick Haworth

Kashtin chronology
Innu (1991)	Akua Tuta (1994)

Akua Tuta is the third album by Canadian folk rock duo Kashtin, released in 1994. Akua Tuta was the final album released by the band under the name Kashtin, although band members Claude McKenzie and Florent Vollant have each continued to record as solo artists.

The album was a shortlisted nominee for the Juno Award for Best Music of Aboriginal Canada Recording at the Juno Awards of 1995.

The title track was selected by Robbie Robertson for inclusion on his television soundtrack Music for The Native Americans, and was also used on Due South in the episode "Hawk and a Handsaw".

== Track listing ==
As with all three of the band's albums, the album cover included title translations in both English and French, as well as the original titles in Innu, the band's native language.

1. "Akua Tuta" (Take Care/Fais attention)
2. "Uasset" (All the Children/Tous les enfants)
3. "Ashtam Nashue" (Come Follow Me/Viens suis-moi)
4. "Nuitsheuan" (My Friend/Mon ami)
5. "Miam Uapukun" (Like a Flower/Comme une fleur)
6. "Ne Puamun" (My Dreams/Mes rêves)
7. "Tapue Shtutune" (You Really Make Me.../Vraiment tu me fais...)
8. "Apu Shapentaman" (Without Interest/Sans interêt)
9. "Uauitemu" (Tell Me/Dis-moi)
10. "Tshekuanu Mak" (Why/Pourquoi)
11. "Utei Teu Etaian" (Here With Me/Ici avec moi)
12. "Iame" (Good Bye/Au revoir)
