= 42nd Félix Awards =

2020 Canadian music award ceremony

- Date: November 1, 2020
- Hosted by: Louis-José Houde

Television/radio coverage
- Network: SRC

The 42nd Félix Awards were held on November 1, 2020 to honour achievements in Quebec music. The gala ceremony was hosted by Louis-José Houde, and televised by Ici Radio-Canada Télé.

Due to the COVID-19 pandemic in Canada, the ceremony was conducted under social distancing protocols; in his opening monologue, Houde joked that when he agreed to host the ceremony for the fifteenth time, he did not know that it would be "a PowerPoint at the Sheraton". Only nominees themselves were permitted in the theatre with no unnominated guests allowed, and were seated at tables spaced six feet apart; rather than winners coming up to the stage to accept their awards, the trophies were delivered directly to their tables by masked waiters.

== Nominees and winners ==
Male Artist of the Year	Female Artist of the Year
Émile Bilodeau; Ludovick Bourgeois; Louis-Jean Cormier; Marc Dupré; Pierre Lapointe	Alexandra Stréliski; Marie-Pierre Arthur; Isabelle Boulay; Marie-Mai; Ariane Moffatt
Group of the Year	Revelation of the Year
Les Cowboys Fringants; 2Frères; Bleu Jeans Bleu; Kaïn; Les Sœurs Boulay	Eli Rose; Evelyne Brochu; Flore Laurentienne; Miro; P'tit Belliveau
Song of the Year	Songwriter of the Year
Les Cowboys Fringants, "L'Amérique pleure"; 2Frères, "À tous les vents"; Bleu Jeans Bleu, "Coton Ouaté"; Ludovick Bourgeois, "Que sera ma vie"; Roxane Bruneau, "Aime-moi encore"; Cœur de pirate, "Ne m'appelle pas"; Louis-Jean Cormier, "Je me moi"; Corneille, "Le bonheur"; Lara Fabian, "Par amour"; Ariane Moffatt, "Pour toi"	Louis-Jean Cormier, Daniel Beaumont, Alan Côté and David Goudreault, Quand la nuit tombe (Louis-Jean Cormier); Stéphanie Boulay and Mélanie Boulay, La mort des étoiles (Les Sœurs Boulay); Mathieu David Gagnon, Volume 1 (Flore Laurentienne); Pierre Lapointe, Pour déjouer l'ennui (Pierre Lapointe); Akena "KNLO" Okoko and Louis-Nicolas Imbeau, Sainte-Foy (KNLO)
Indigenous Artist of the Year	Adult Contemporary Album of the Year
Elisapie; Anachnid; Matiu; Scott-Pien Picard; Shauit	Louis-Jean Cormier, Quand la nuit tombe; 2Frères, À tous les vents; Kaïn, Je viens d'ici; Pierre Lapointe, Pour déjouer l'ennui; Les Sœurs Boulay, La mort des étoiles
Alternative Album of the Year	Anglophone Album of the Year
Marie-Pierre Arthur, Des feux pour voir; Fred Fortin, Microdose; Mon Doux Saigneur, Horizon; Dany Placard, J'connais rien à l'astronomie; P'tit Belliveau, Greatest Hits Vol. 1	Patrick Watson, Wave; Naya Ali, Godspeed: Baptism (Prelude); Anachnid, Dreamweaver; Leonard Cohen, Thanks for the Dance; Matt Holubowski, Weird Ones
Bestselling Album of the Year	Classical Album of the Year, Orchestra or Large Ensemble
Les Cowboys Fringants, Les Antipodes; Bleu Jeans Bleu, Perfecto; Jean Leloup, L'Étrange pays; Loud, Tout ça pour ça; Alexandra Stréliski, Inscape	Angèle Dubeau & La Pietà, Pulsations; Jonathan Cohen, Les Violons du Roy; Kent Nagano and the Montreal Symphony Orchestra, The John Adams Album; Charles Richard-Hamelin, Mozart: Concertos pour piano Nos 22 et 24
Classical Album of the Year, Solo or Small Ensemble	Country Album of the Year
Charles Richard-Hamelin, Chopin: Ballades et Impromptus; Luc Beauséjour, Le rappel des oiseaux; Mathieu Gaudet, Schubert: Le premier romantique; Alain Lefèvre, My Paris Years; Alain Lefèvre and Hélène Mercier, André Mathieu – Concerto de Québec & œuvres pour deux pianos	Patrick Norman, Si on y allait; Cindy Bédard, Après l'orage; Véronique Labbé, Une minute; Marie-Ève Laure, Onze; Phil G. Smith, On fait du country
Critic's Choice Album of the Year	Folk Album of the Year
Marie-Pierre Arthur, Des feux pour voir; Louis-Jean Cormier, Quand la nuit tombe; Les Cowboys Fringants, Les Antipodes; Flore Laurentienne, Volume 1; Les Hay Babies, Boîte aux lettres	Jean Leloup, L'Étrange pays; Émile Bilodeau, Grandeur mature; Sara Dufour, Sara Dufour; Les Hay Babies, Boîte aux lettres; Alexandre Poulin, Nature humaine
Instrumental Album of the Year	Interpretive Album of the Year
Gregory Charles, LEN; Viviane Audet, Alexis Martin and Robin-Joël Cool, Conséquences (Bande originale de la série); Flore Laurentienne, Volume 1; Organ Mood, Indivisible	Isabelle Boulay, En attendant Noël; Les Hôtesses d'Hilaire, Viens avec moi (Live); Laurence Jalbert, Au Pays de Nana Mouskouri; Mario Pelchat, Aznavour - Désormais; Tire le coyote, Session acoustique I
Jazz Album of the Year	Other Language Album of the Year
Jacques Kuba Séguin, Migrations; Emie R Roussel Trio, Rythme de passage; Carl Mayotte, Fantosme; Rachel Therrien, Vena; Jean-Pierre Zanell, Rio Minas	Various Artists, Nikamu Mamuitun-Chansons Rassembleuses; Natalie Choquette, Colores; Guy Mapoko, Pardon; Nomadic Massive, Times; Various Artists, Nitehi Aimihewin
Pop Album of the Year	Rap Album of the Year
Marc Dupré, Rien ne se perd; Ludovick Bourgeois, 2; Evelyne Brochu, Objets perdus; Laurence Nerbonne, Feu; SOMMM, SOMMM	KNLO, Sainte-Foy; Dramatik, Le Phénix, il était plusieurs fois, LaF, Citadelle; Robert Nelson, Nul n'est roé en son royaume; Souldi, Backstage
Rock Album of the Year	Traditional Album of the Year
Les Cowboys Fringants, Les Antipodes; Chocolat, Jazz engagé; Corridor, Junior; France D'Amour, D'Amour et rock'n'roll	Salebarbes, Live au Pas Perdus; Le Diable à Cinq, Debout!; É.T.É, Les quatre roses; Mélisande (électrotrad), Les myriades
World Music Album of the Year	Youth Album of the Year
Zal Sissokho, Kora Flamenca; Didem Başar, Levantine Rhapsody; Boogat, El Gato y Los Rumberos; ILAM, NÉNÉ; Mateo, Vengo De Frente	Arthur l'aventurier, Arthur L'aventurier au bout du monde en Australie; Atchoum & Pépé et sa guitare, Ça promet!; Maria Cannelloni, Le Tourne-Fêtes; Ariane DesLions, Rêves à colorier; Henri Godon, Tous musiciens
Anglophone Concert Tour of the Year	Comedy Concert Tour of the Year
Patrick Watson, "Wave"; Dominique Fils-Aimé, "Stay Tuned!"; Martin Fontaine, "Elvis Experience Montréal 72 - Comme si c'était arrivé..."; Matt Holubowski, "Weird Ones"; Matt Lang, "Matt Lang"	Sam Breton, "Au pic pis à pelle"; Rachid Badouri, "Les fleurs du tapis"; Yannick De Martino, "Les dalmatiens sont énormes en campagne"; Simon Gouache, "Une belle soirée"; Rosalie Vaillancourt, "Enfant roi"
Interpretive Concert Tour of the Year	Singer-Songwriter Concert Tour of the Year
Véronic DiCaire, "Véronic DiCaire en Spectacle"; Diane Dufresne, "Diane Dufresne symphonique: De concert avec vous"; Michel Faubert, "Le chant du silence"; Various Artists, Le Fantôme de l'Opéra - version concert; Various Artists, Mamma Mia!	Robert Charlebois, "Robert en CharleboisScope"; Bleu Jeans Bleu, "Perfecto"; Les Hôtesses d'Hilaire, "Viens avec moi"; Loud, "Tout ça pour ça"; Alexandra Stréliski, "Inscape"
Video of the Year	
Les Cowboys Fringants, "L'Amérique pleure"; Alaclair Ensemble, "Mets du respect dans ton bac"; Bleu Jeans Bleu, "Le king de la danse en ligne"; Louis-Jean Cormier, "100 mètres haies"; FouKi, "Ciel" (avec Alicia Moffet); KNLO, "Ça fait mal"
