= Innu Nikamu: Resist and Sing =

2017 Canadian documentary film

- Film poster
- French: Innu Nikamu: Chanter la résistance
- Directed by: Kevin Bacon-Hervieux
- Written by: Kevin Bacon-Hervieux
- Produced by: Ian Boyd
- Cinematography: Philippe St-Gelais
- Edited by: Geoffrey Boulangé
- Music by: Florent Vollant
- Production company: Terre Innu
- Distributed by: Vidéographe
- Release date: October 10, 2017 (FNC)
- Running time: 92 minutes
- Country: Canada
- Languages: French; English; Innu-aimun

Innu Nikamu: Resist and Sing (French: Innu Nikamu: Chanter la résistance) is a Canadian documentary film, directed by Kevin Bacon-Hervieux and released in 2017. The film is a profile of Innu Nikamu, an Innu music festival which is held on the grounds of the former Sept-Iles Indian residential school. Musical figures appearing in the film include Shauit, Florent Vollant and the rock band Simple Plan.

The film premiered on October 10, 2017, at the Festival du nouveau cinéma.

The film won the Prix Iris for Best Documentary Film at the 21st Quebec Cinema Awards in 2019.
