= Fartman =

Fartman can refer to

- Fartman (Howard Stern), a flatulent superhero
- Matshishkapeu, literally "Fart Man", in Innu mythology
