= Alex Burger (musician) =

Canadian country singer-songwriter

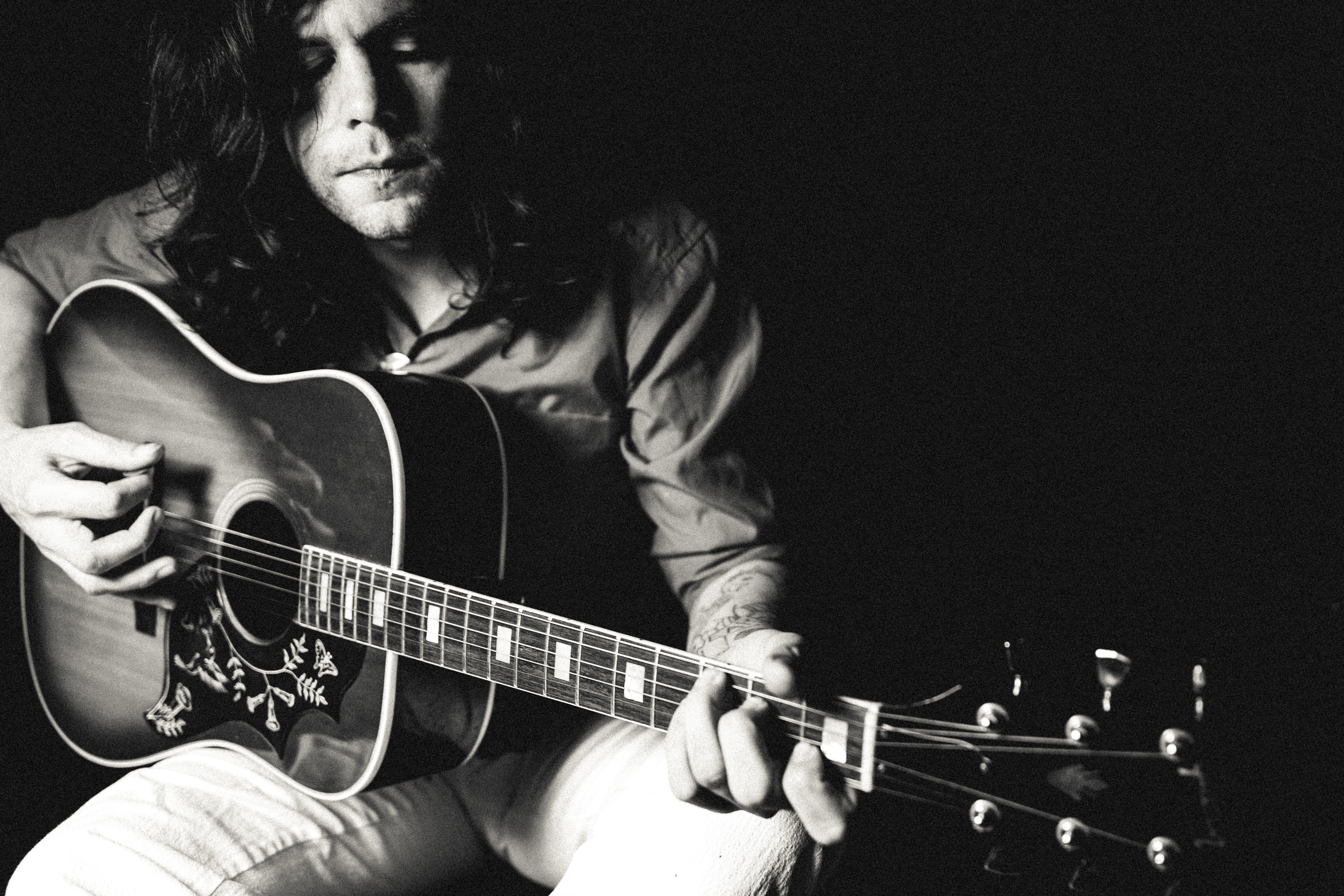
Alex Burger

Alex Burger (born October 24, 1990) is a Canadian country singer-songwriter, based in Quebec. He released his first EP, À m’ment donné, in 2018, followed by Sweet Montérégie in 2021.

== Career ==
Burger comes from a family in which country music was present. Through his grandfather, he learned about Willie Lamothe, a pioneer of Canadian and Quebecois country music.

Burger was part of the nine-member group Câltar-Bateau, which released two albums: Verbal boisson # 7 in 2014 and La bavure des possessions in 2015. The latter album allowed the group to advance to the finals of the Francouvertes in 2016. The group went on hiatus in 2017. Burger also participated in the Bon Enfant project as a bassist and was also a bassist for Mon Doux Saigneur. He launched his solo career in 2018.

In 2020, Burger participated in La Voix, the Quebec adaptation of The Voice, with a performance of "Doris" by Stephen Faulkner. Participation in La Voix improved his visibility with the Quebec public. His first full-length album, Sweet Montérégie, was released in 2021. La Presse described it as a "surprise," rating it 4 out of 5 stars and noting the background work done by Burger on supporting texts, composition, and arrangement.

Sweet Montérégie won the Felix Award for Country Album of the Year at the 43rd Félix Awards in 2021.

== Discography ==
- À m’ment donné (EP, 2018)
- Plus grande que nature (single, 2020)
- Sweet Montérégie (2021)
