= Innu tea doll =

Innu toy and tea cache

A tea doll is a traditional Innu doll that served both as a children's toy and as a cache of tea. Known as Innikueu in Innu, the dolls were stuffed with tea that could be recovered and used by hunters in times of need. The dolls were carried by the children of hunters, to save weight on the hunt. Once the tea had been consumed, the doll was re-stuffed with grass or leaves.
