= Anachnid =

Canadian electronic musician

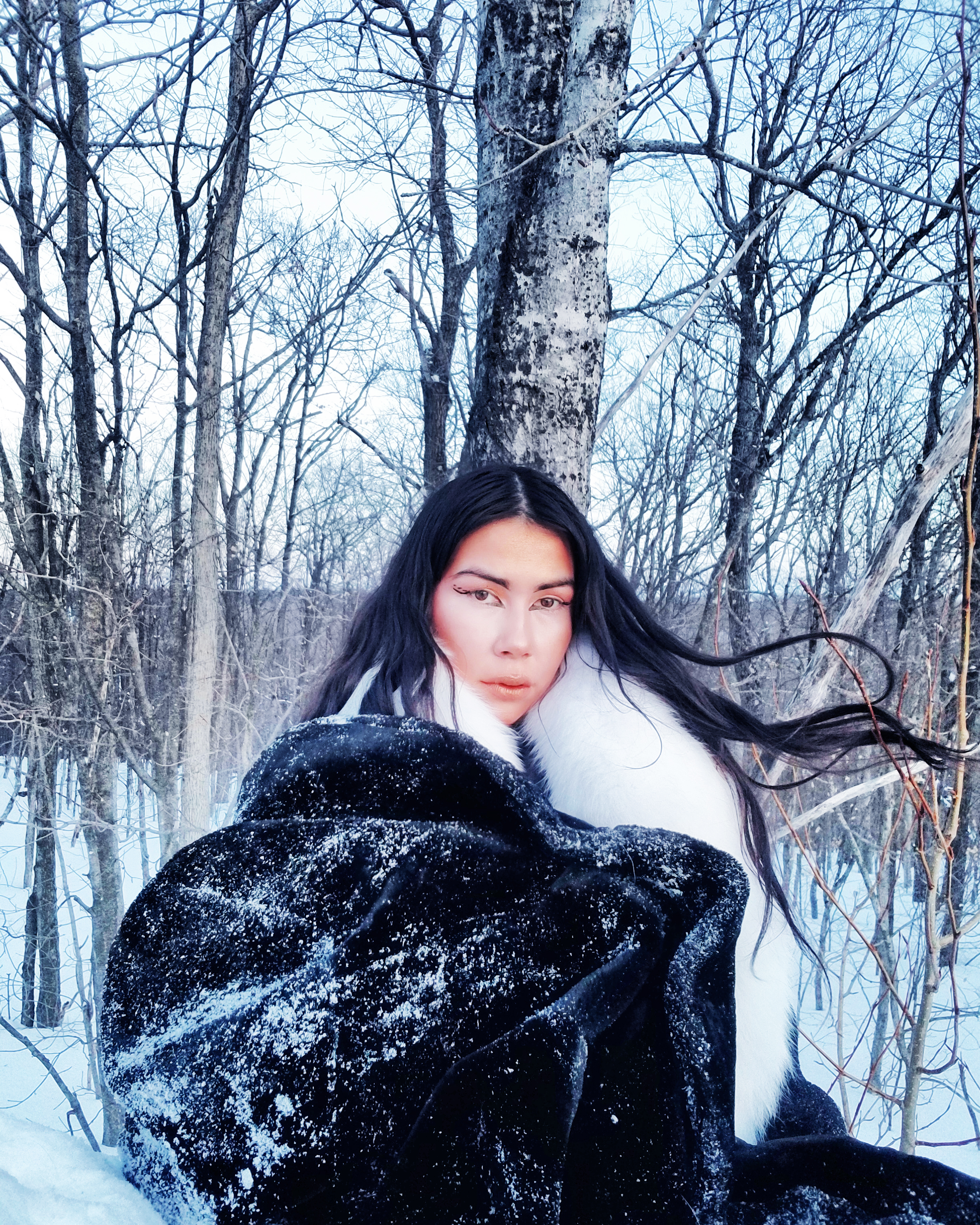

Anachnid is a Canadian electronic musician based in Montreal, Quebec. She is most noted for winning the Felix Award for Indigenous Artist of the Year at the 43rd Félix Awards in 2021.

Her debut album Dreamweaver, released in February 2020, was longlisted for the 2020 Polaris Music Prize, and received Felix Award nominations for indigenous artist of the year and anglophone album of the year at the 42nd Felix Awards.

Of Oji-Cree and Mi'kmaq heritage, she grew up primarily in Atikamekw territory in Western Quebec. She performs primarily in English, although some of her music incorporates indigenous languages. She chose her performing name Anachnid because she considers the spider to be her totem animal.

She won the award for Indigenous Songwriter of the Year at the Indigenous Music Awards in 2019.

== Personal life ==
Her grandfather Elijah Harper was a politician and a member of the Red Sucker Lake First Nation.
