= Atshen =

Spirit in Innu mythology related to the werewolf

In Innu mythology, Atshen is a cannibalistic spirit that hunts through the permafrost.

== See also ==
- Werewolf
- Wendigo
