= Collège international Marie de France =

Canadian international school in Quebec

Coordinates: 45°29′24″N 73°37′28″W

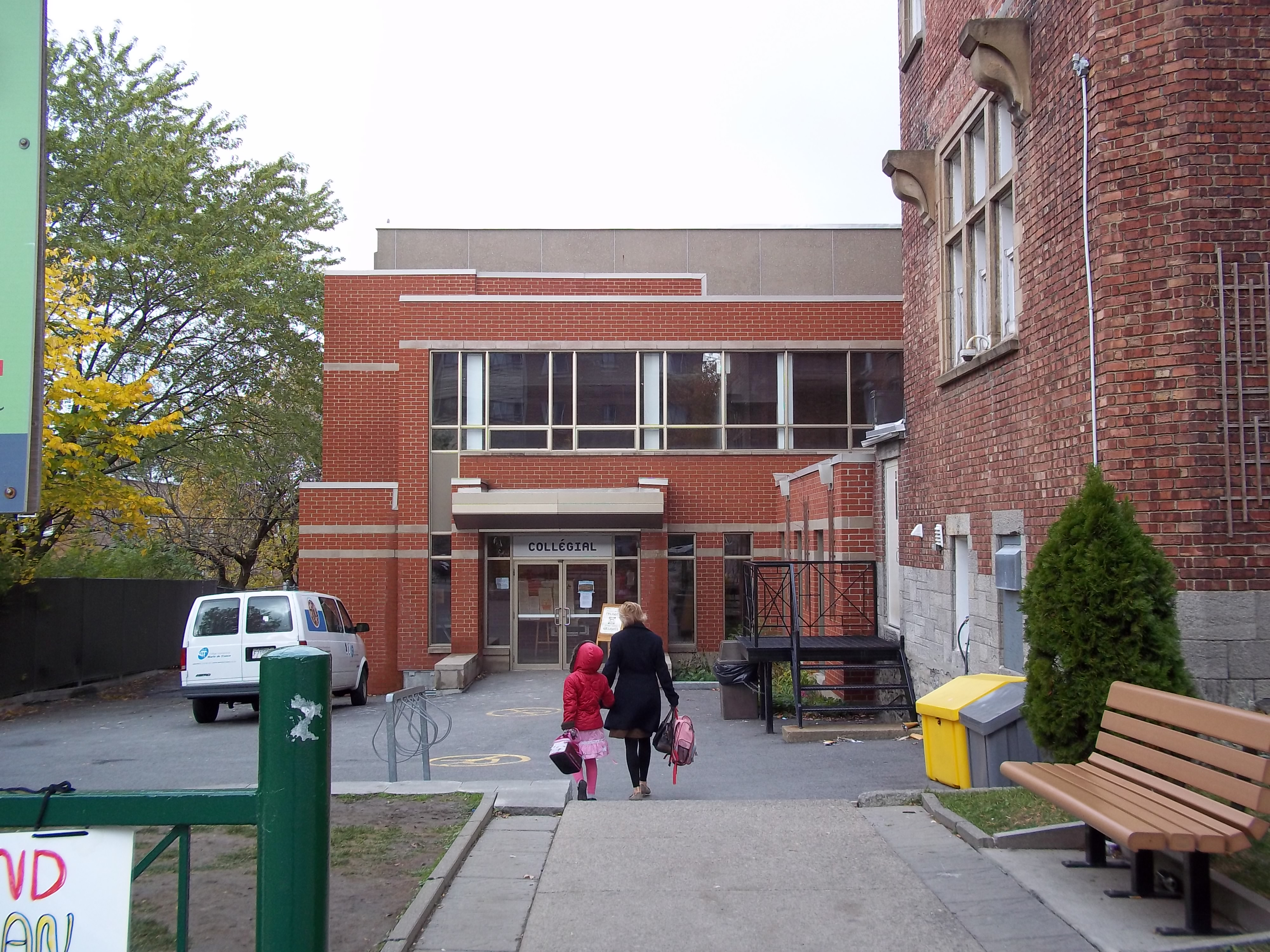
- College entrance
- Motto: Ensemble, prêts pour le monde (French)
- Motto in English: Together, a world to discover
- Type: private kindergarten through college
- Established: 1939
- Affiliations: non-denominational
- Academic affiliations: ACCC, CCAA,
- Location: 4635, chemin Queen Mary; Montreal, Quebec, Canada; H3W 1W3
- Campus: Urban
- Website: www.cimf.ca
- Location within Montreal Location within Quebec Location within Canada

The Collège international Marie de France (formerly Collège Marie de France, named after Marie de France, a French poet of the 12th century) is a French-language private international school in Montreal, Quebec, Canada. Founded in 1939 by French expatriates, the school prepares its students from age 4 to 18 for the French baccalauréat. It also provides equivalence with the diplomas of Québec as defined in the framework of the international agreement between France and Québec, enabling students to spend school in both the Canadian and French system. It is one of the two French private lycées located in Montréal, alongside Collège Stanislas.

== Education ==
All students learn three languages (French, English and a choice of either Spanish, Italian or German). Students benefit from optional theatre, music and art classes, and are also taught physics, biology and calculus. Additionally, optional courses such as Latin, Ancient Greek or art history can be taken. The school has kindergarten, elementary, secondary and CEGEP programs. Pronote is used as a school management software by students, teachers, administration and parents.

== Notable people ==
- Dominique LANTIEZ (principal)
- Frantz GOUSSET (assistant principal)
- Émmanuelle Merlet-Caron (author)
- Dobrina Ollivier
- Emmanuelle Béart
- John Brownstein
- Alexandra Stréliski
