= Willie Dunn =

Canadian politician, writer, filmmaker, and musician

- Willie Dunn in the late 1970s.
- Born: William Lawrence Dunn; August 14, 1941; Montreal, Quebec, Canada
- Died: August 5, 2013 (aged 71); Ottawa, Ontario, Canada
- Occupations: Film director, producer, screenwriter, musician

William Lawrence Dunn (August 14, 1941 – August 5, 2013) was a Canadian singer-songwriter, film director and politician. Born in Montreal, he was of mixed Mi'kmaq and Scottish/Irish background. Dunn often highlighted indigenous issues in his work.

== Music career ==
Born in Montreal, Quebec, Canada, Dunn was a singer and acoustic guitarist. He released several full-length albums of recorded music including Willie Dunn (1971), The Pacific (1980) and Metallic (1999). Metallic reprises material from both earlier releases. Dunn's most famous song, "I Pity the Country", was a critique of colonialism and anti-indigenous racism; he was also known for the song "Son of the Sun", which Kashtin covered on their second album Innu. In 2004 Dunn released the album Son of the Sun with sixteen songs (including three live recordings).

He participated in the Culturally Diverse First Peoples Arts Showcase tour in 1998, and the Nations in a Circle spotlight of 2002. He was inducted into the Aboriginal Walk of Honour in 2005.

Dunn died in Ottawa on August 5, 2013, aged 71.

His songs "I Pity the Country", "Son of the Sun" and "Peruvian Dream" are featured on the 2014 compilation album Native North America, Vol. 1.

Creation Never Sleeps, Creation Never Dies, a compilation of songs from throughout his career, was released in 2021 on Light in the Attic Records.

In 2026 his self-titled debut album was named a winner of the Slaight Family Polaris Heritage Prize at the 2026 Polaris Music Prize gala.

== Film ==
He wrote a song entitled "The Ballad of Crowfoot" and directed a ten-minute National Film Board of Canada (NFB) film of the same name in 1968. Both the song and video are about inhumane and unjust colonial treatment of indigenous Canadians, as well as their taking charge of their destiny and becoming politically active. The first NFB film directed by an indigenous filmmaker, the film received several awards including a Gold Hugo for best short film at the 1969 Chicago International Film Festival. His other films include The Eagle Project, The Voice of the Land and Self-Government, and his music was used for the films Incident at Restigouche, about a 1981 police raid on the Listuguj Mi'gmaq First Nation, and Okanada, about the 1990 standoff in Oka, Quebec between police and native protesters.

The Ballad of Crowfoot has sometimes been credited as the first known Canadian music video. In 2020 the Prism Prize, Canada's annual award for innovations in music video, introduced a lifetime achievement award named in Dunn's memory, with choreographer and video director Laurieann Gibson named as the first winner of the award.

== Politics ==
A longtime member of the New Democratic Party, Dunn defeated Mohamed Bassuny to win the party's federal nomination for Ottawa—Vanier in the 1993 federal election. He received 3,155 votes (6.50%), finishing fourth against Liberal incumbent Jean-Robert Gauthier.

== Discography ==
=== Albums ===
| Year | Album |
|---|---|
| 1971 | Willie Dunn |
| 1972 | Willie Dunn |
| 1980 | The Pacific |
| 1984 | The Vanity of Human Wishes |

=== Anthologies ===
| Year | Album |
|---|---|
| 1999 | Metallic |
| 2004 | Son of the Sun |
| 2021 | Creation Never Sleeps, Creation Never Dies: The Willie Dunn Anthology |

=== Singles ===
| Year | Single | CAN Country | Album |
|---|---|---|---|
| 1971 | "Schooldays" | 35 | Willie Dunn |
| 1973 | "I Pity the Country" | 79 | Willie Dunn |
