= Kashtin (album) =

Studio album by Kashtin
- Released: 1989
- Genre: folk, First Nations
- Label: Groupe Concept/Trans-Canada
- Producer: Guy Trépanier

Kashtin chronology
Kashtin (1989)	Innu (1991)

Kashtin is the debut album by Canadian folk rock duo Kashtin, released in 1989. The album featured the hit singles "Tshinanu" and "E Uassiuian".

== Track listing ==
As with all three of the band's albums, the album cover included title translations in both English and French, as well as the original titles in Innu, the band's native language.

1. "E Uassiuian" (My Childhood/Mon Enfance)
2. "Kashtin" (Tornado/Tornade)
3. "E Peikussian" (Solitude/Solitude)
4. "Pakuakumit" (Pointe-Bleue/Pointe-Bleue)
5. "Shashish" (A Long Time Ago/Il y a longtemps)
6. "Apu Tshekuan" (It Doesn't Matter/Sans importance)
7. "Tshinanu" (What We Are/Nous autres)
8. "Tipatshimun" (The Devil's Song/La chanson du diable)
9. "Uitshi" (Help Me/Aide-moi)
10. "Ashtam Nituapam" (Come Find Me/Viens me trouver)
11. "Shteteian" (Departure/Depart)
12. "Nitanish (N'Teish)" (My Daughter/Ma fille)
