= Felix Award for Indigenous Artist of the Year =

The Felix Award for Indigenous Artist of the Year (French: Prix Félix pour l’artiste autochtone de l’année) is an annual Canadian music award, presented as part of the Félix Awards to honour music by First Nations and Inuit musicians in Quebec. The award was presented for the first time in 2019.

== Winners and nominees ==
Year	Winner	Nominees	Refs.
2019	Florent Vollant	Elisapie; Maten; Matiu; Shauit	
2020	Elisapie	Anachnid; Matiu; Scott-Pien Picard; Shauit	
2021	Anachnid	Kanen; Matiu; Scott-Pien Picard; Q052	
2022	Laura Niquay	Beatrice Deer; Natasha Kanapé; Scott-Pien Picard; Samian	
2023	Kanen	Kathia Rock; Matiu; Natasha Kanapé; Shauit	
2024	Elisapie	Jeremy Dutcher; Natasha Kanapé; Soleil Launière; Florent Vollant	
