= Flore Laurentienne =

Canadian instrumental music project

Flore Laurentienne is a Canadian instrumental music project, whose core member is Mathieu David Gagnon.

Born in La Pocatière, Quebec, Gagnon grew up in Sainte-Anne-des-Monts. He is the brother of singer-songwriter Klô Pelgag. He studied classical and orchestral music in France at the Conservatoire de Bordeaux and the Conservatoire d’Aubervilliers, and upon returning to Quebec he worked as an arranger and producer for Pelgag, Les Hôtesses d'Hilaire and Guillaume Arsenault. Choosing the name Flore Laurentienne for the botanical writings of Marie-Victorin Kirouac, he created a series of orchestral compositions inspired by mankind's relationship with nature, which were released as the album Volume 1 in 2019.

Volume 1 was longlisted for the 2020 Polaris Music Prize. It received four Felix Award nominations for Revelation of the Year, Songwriter of the Year, Critic's Choice Album of the Year and Instrumental Album of the Year at the 42nd Felix Awards in 2020, and a Juno Award nomination for Instrumental Album of the Year at the Juno Awards of 2021.
