= Jacques Kuba Séguin =

Canadian jazz trumpeter

Jacques Kuba Séguin is a Polish Canadian musician and radio host.

== Early life ==
Séguin was born in Poland to a Québécois father and a Polish mother.

== Career ==
Séguin is a jazz trumpet player, composer, orchestrator, and radio host. He is most noted for his 2019 album Migrations, which won the Juno Award for Solo Jazz Album of the Year at the Juno Awards 2020 and the Felix Award for Jazz Album of the Year at the 42nd Felix Awards.

He was a leader of several ensembles, such as MiGRATIONS, Litania Projekt, and Odd Lot. He was the winner of the 2012-13 Radio-Canada Revelations prize. In 2015, he was nominated for two ADISQ awards and Prix Opus awards as Best Arranger and Jazz Album of the Year for L’élévation du point de chute. In 2016, he was nominated for two ADISQ awards Litania Projekt with the Quatuor Bozzini best arranger and jazz album of the year.

Séguin performed with others, such as Elizabeth Shepherd, Yves Léveillé, the Jazzlab, Philippe Côté, and Vic Vogel Big band. He toured for two years with Delirium in 150 cities around the world.

== Discography ==
- ODD LOT (2005)
- ODD LOT 2/3 (2008)
- Litania Projekt (2012)
- ODD LOT: :L'élévation du point de chute (2014)
- Litania Projekt avec le quatuor Bozzini (2016)
- MiGRATIONS (2019)
- ODD LOT - Compilation 15 ans (2020)
- Parfum no.1 (2023)
- Parfum no.2 (2024)
