= Zal Sissokho =

Senegalese-Canadian musician

Zal Sissokho photographed with Djely Tapa in Montréal, Québec, Canada inside the Pointe-Aux-Trembles Cultural Centre.

Zal Sissokho is a Senegalese-Canadian musician based in Montreal, Quebec. He is most noted for his 2020 album Kora Flamenca, an exploration of the fusion of African kora with Spanish flamenco which won the Félix Award for World Music Album of the Year at the 42nd Félix Awards. The album has also been shortlisted for the Juno Award for World Music Album of the Year at the Juno Awards of 2021, and won the Canadian Folk Music Award for World Music Album of the Year at the 16th Canadian Folk Music Awards.

Sissokho, who moved to Canada in 1999, founded the band Buntalo in 2004. His music draws on the griot tradition of West African storytelling and music. In addition to Kora Flamenca, he has released three albums with Buntalo, and one album as a trio with musicians Marcus Viana and Ibrahima Gaye.

== Discography ==
- Silaba (2008, with Buntalo)
- Le Partage (2012, with Buntalo)
- Famalé (2015, with Marcus Viana and Ibrahima Gaye)
- Le Palabre (2017, with Buntalo)
- Kora Flamenca (2020)
