= Innu (album) =

Studio album by Kashtin
- Released: 1991
- Genre: folk, First Nations
- Label: Groupe Concept
- Producer: Guy Trépanier

Kashtin chronology
Kashtin (1989)	Innu (1991)	Akua Tuta (1994)

Innu is the second album by Canadian folk rock band Kashtin, released in 1991. The album was certified platinum in Canada, and was a shortlisted Juno Award nominee for the Best World Beat Recording and Best Roots and Traditional Album awards at the Juno Awards of 1992.

It contains the band's biggest chart hit, "Ishkuess", as well as a cover of Willie Dunn's "Son of the Sun", the only song the band ever recorded in a language other than their native Innu tongue.

== Track listing ==
1. Overture
2. Nikanish (My People)
3. Nekashtuamani
4. Nte Tshitshuat (Your Place)
5. Apu Tshekuan Nikan'kuian
6. Harricana
7. Son of the Sun
8. Tshinuau
9. Apu Min'tan
10. Uishama
11. Ishkuess
