= Kashtin =

Canadian folk rock duo

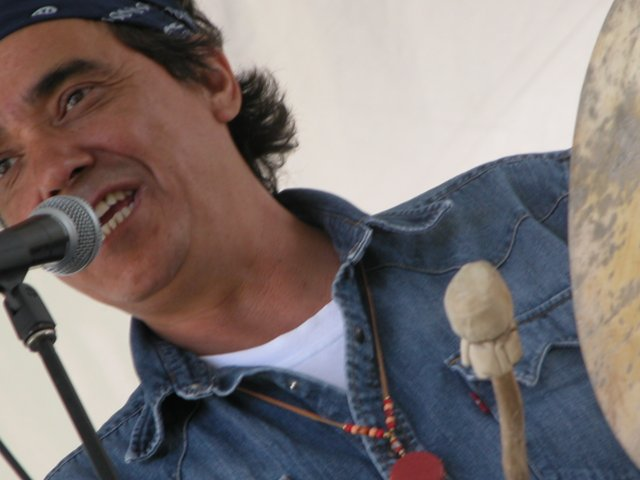
- Innu singer-songwriter Florent Vollant performing at the Botanic Garden in Montreal in October 2006

Background information
- Origin: Maliotenam, Quebec, Canada
- Genres: folk rock
- Years active: 1984–1996
- Members: Claude McKenzie; Florent Vollant
- Website: kashtin.ca

Kashtin were a Canadian folk rock duo in the 1980s and 1990s, one of the most commercially successful and famous musical groups in First Nations history.

== Career ==
The band was formed in 1984 by Claude McKenzie and Florent Vollant, two Innu musicians from the Maliotenam reserve on the Saint Lawrence River in Quebec. The name Kashtin means "tornado" in the Innu-aimun language, but was also chosen as a pun on the English language phrase "cashed in", in response to friends who alleged that the band was selling out by pursuing attention and success beyond their own community. They began as a cover band, performing songs by Pink Floyd, U2, Bob Dylan, Neil Young, and The Beatles in Innu communities, before beginning to write and perform original material. Their music followed a mainstream folk rock style, but incorporated traditional Innu makushan drums. Around the same time as the launch of the band, Vollant and McKenzie were involved in the creation of Innu Nikamu, a music festival celebrating indigenous music.

In 1988, they were featured in a television documentary on the Innu people, increasing their public profile throughout Quebec. They were soon invited to Montreal by producer Guy Trépanier to record, and released their self-titled debut album in 1989. Although that album was recorded in their native Innu-aimun language, spoken by just 12,000 people in the world, the album quickly became a major hit in Quebec, Greenland and soon in English Canada as well, eventually being certified double platinum and winning the Prix Félix for Best Debut Album. The singles "E Uassiuian" and "Tshinanu" were popular hits for the band.

In 1990, the band toured Europe and made commercial breakthroughs there, most notably becoming Top 10 stars in France after performing there as an opening act for Louis Chedid. In the same year, however, they were briefly a subject of controversy when radio stations CKAC and CFGL-FM briefly stopped playing their music during the Oka crisis, although the stations eventually backed off following criticism of the move.

In 1991, the band embarked on their first full cross-Canada tour in the spring and summer, and released their second album, Innu, in the fall. That album spawned the band's biggest Canadian hit single, "Ishkuess", and included a cover of Willie Dunn's "Son of the Sun", the only song the band ever recorded in English. The album was a shortlisted Juno Award nominee for the Best World Beat Recording and Best Roots and Traditional Album awards at the Juno Awards of 1992.

In 1992, they were featured in an episode of CBC Television's Ear to the Ground, and headlined the televised concert Indian Time II: Fly With Eagles. The following year, McKenzie was arrested for impaired driving, and spent several months in jail in 1994.

For their third album, 1994's Akua Tuta, Kashtin signed with Columbia Records. Robbie Robertson included the title track from that album on his album Music for The Native Americans. Their songs also appeared on the soundtracks to the film Dance Me Outside and the television shows Northern Exposure and Due South, and the album received a Juno Award nomination for Best Aboriginal Recording at the Juno Awards of 1995.

Following Akua Tuta, Vollant announced that he wanted to take a break from music, and McKenzie released his debut solo album Innu Town in 1996, while Vollant reemerged in 1999 with the solo album Nipaiamianan. They have not released another album as Kashtin, although they have continued to perform occasional live shows together. They also collaborated with hip hop musician Samian on his 2010 remake of "Tshinanu".

== Discography ==
- Kashtin (1989)
- Innu (1991)
- Akua Tuta (1994)
