= Kanen (singer) =

Innu singer-songwriter

Karen Pinette-Fontaine
- Born: Uashat
- Occupations: Singer, songwriter
- Writing career
- Genres: Folk music, Pop music
- Website: nikamowin.com/fr/artiste/kanen

Karen Pinette-Fontaine (born January 5, 1999), known by the stage name Kanen, is an Innu singer-songwriter from Uashat-Maliotenam, Quebec. She is most noted as a Felix Award nominee for Indigenous Artist of the Year at the 43rd Félix Awards.

Pinette-Fontaine launched her musical career as a member of Florent Vollant's Nikamu Mamuitun collective in 2019, alongside Marcie Michaud-Gagnon, Joëlle St-Pierre, Chloé Lacasse, Scott-Pien Picard, Matiu, Cédrik St-Onge and Ivan Boivin, and released her self-titled debut EP that year. She competed in the 2020 edition of the Francouvertes music competition.

She has also been associated with the Wapikoni Mobile filmmaking collective, for which she directed the short film Battles (Batailles) and appeared as herself in Sonia Bonspille Boileau's documentary film Wapikoni.
