= Geneviève McKenzie-Sioui =

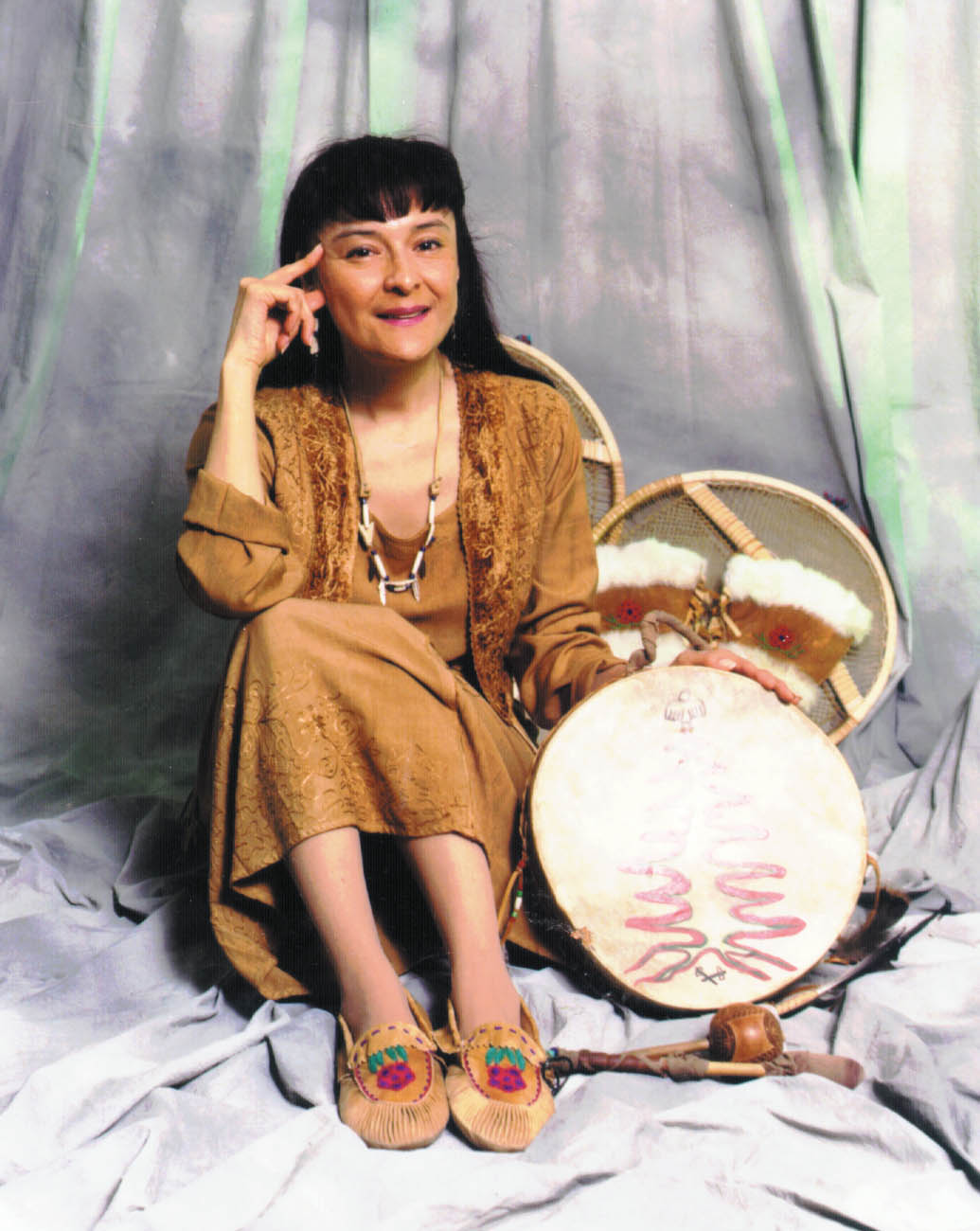

Background information
- Also known as: Shanipiap
- Born: 1956 (age 68–69)
- Genres: Innu music
- Instrument: drum
- Website: shanipiap.tv

Geneviève McKenzie-Sioui, sometimes performing under the name Shanipiap, is an Innu musician, writer, television creator, and activist in Quebec. Born in Matimekosh in 1956, she later relocated to Wendake. She is a singer-songwriter in the Innu language, and an author in both Innu and in French, has been the producer/director/presenter of her own children's television program on Aboriginal Peoples Television Network and TFO, and has recently been active in the Idle No More movement.
