= Inscape (album) =

Studio album by Alexandra Stréliski
- Released: October 5, 2018
- Genre: Neoclassical
- Label: Secret City Records

Alexandra Stréliski chronology
Pianoscope (2010)	Inscape (2018)

Inscape is the second album from Canadian composer and pianist Alexandra Stréliski. It consists of eleven pieces for solo piano. The album was nominated for Album of the Year and Instrumental Album of the Year at the 2020 Juno Awards, with Stréliski also being nominated for Breakthrough Artist of the Year. Inscape was also long-listed for the 2019 Polaris Music Prize and was the number one classical album on Apple Music at the end of 2018 in the United States, with two of the tracks have reached over 20 million streams on Spotify. It was named number 9 on Exclaim's Top 10 Experimental & Modern Composition Albums released in 2018. The album led to two Felix Awards for Stréliski: "Author or Composer of the Year" and "Revelation of the Year".
