= Matshishkapeu =

Spirit in Innu mythology

In Innu mythology, Matshishkapeu ('The Farting God') is considered to be one of the most powerful spirits, and thought to be even more powerful than the Caribou Master. According to legend, the Caribou Master withheld caribou from the Innu out of greed, causing them to begin starving. Matshishkapeu approached the Caribou Master and asked him to provide the Innu with enough caribou to eat, but the Caribou Master refused. Matshishkapeu then said if he did not give the Innu caribou, he would be struck with illness. The Caribou Master refused again, subsequently being cursed with a painful case of constipation. Finally, the Caribou Master relented, and Matshishkapeu then cured him of his ailment.
