= Matiu (musician) =

Innu singer-songwriter

- Born: Matthew Vachon; Uashat, Quebec
- Style: Folk, rock
- Website: nikamowin.com/en/artist/matiu

Matiu is the stage name of Matthew Vachon (born 1986), an Innu singer-songwriter from Uashat-Maliotenam, Quebec. He is most noted as a three-time Felix Award nominee for Indigenous Artist of the Year, receiving nods at the 41st Félix Awards in 2019, the 42nd Félix Awards in 2020, and the 43rd Félix Awards in 2021.

Vachon competed in Le Rythme, APTN's music competition for First Nations musicians, in 2016, He released a self-titled EP in 2017, and released his full-length debut album Petikat in 2018.

He has been a member of Florent Vollant's Nikamu Mamuitun collective, alongside Marcie Michaud-Gagnon, Joëlle St-Pierre, Chloé Lacasse, Scott-Pien Picard, Kanen, Cédrik St-Onge and Ivan Boivin,
