= Antoine Corriveau =

Canadian singer-songwriter and author (born 1985)

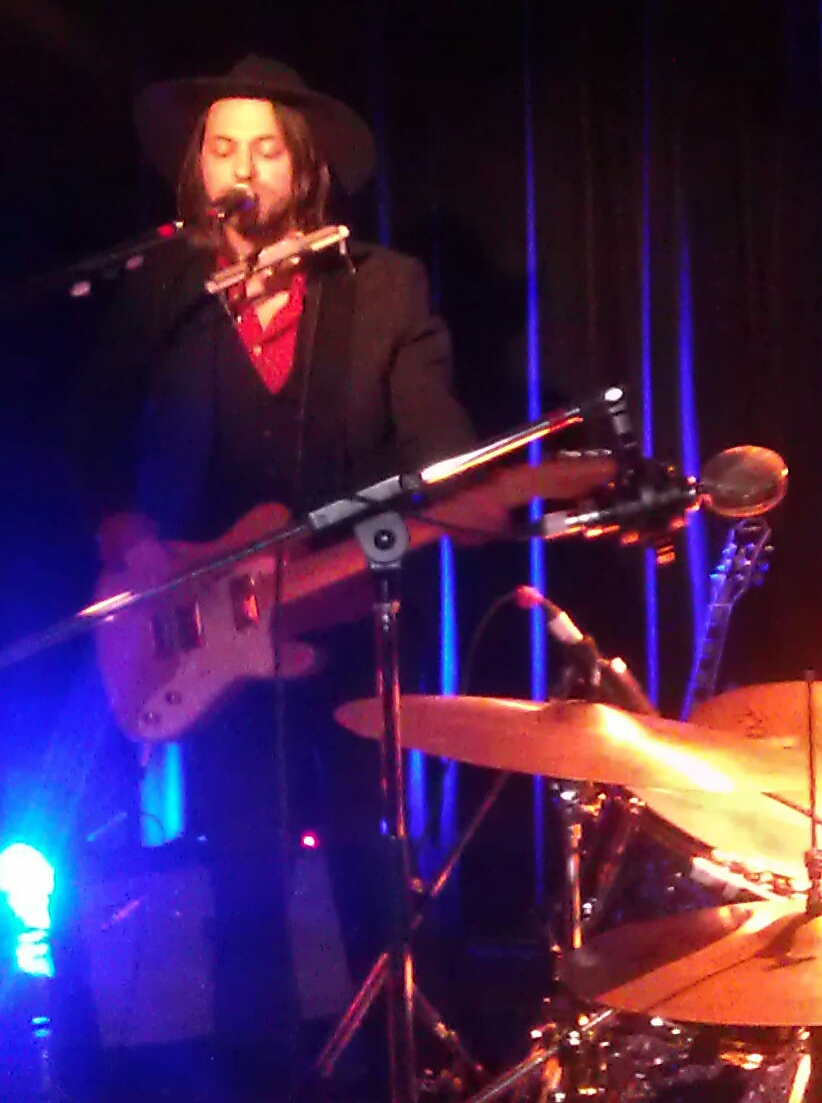
- Corriveau in 2015

Background information
- Born: 1985 (age 40–41)
- Genre: folk rock
- Occupations: Singer-songwriter, author
- Years active: 2008–present

Antoine Corriveau (born 1985) is a Canadian folk rock singer-songwriter and author from Quebec. He is most noted for his 2014 song "Le Nouveau vocabulaire", which won the French division of the SOCAN Songwriting Prize in 2015, and his 2016 album Cette chose qui cognait au creux de sa poitrine sans vouloir s'arrêter, which was longlisted for the 2017 Polaris Music Prize.

His fourth full-length album, Oiseau de Nuit, launched on April 25, 2025, was also longlisted for the 2025 Polaris Music Prize.

== Discography ==
- Entre quatre murs (2008)
- Ni Vu Ni Connu (2009)
- Saint-Maurice/Logan (2011)
- Les Ombres Longues (2014)
- Cette chose qui cognait au creux de sa poitrine sans vouloir s'arrêter (2016)
- Feu de forêt (2018)
- PISSENLIT (2020)
- Oiseau de Nuit (2025)
