= Claude McKenzie =

Canadian singer-songwriter

- Born: 1967 (age 57–58); Schefferville, Quebec, Canada
- Genres: Folk
- Occupation: Singer-songwriter

Claude McKenzie (born 1967 in Schefferville, Quebec) is a Canadian singer-songwriter. An Innu from Maliotenam, he was half of the popular folk music duo Kashtin, the most commercially successful musical group in First Nations history.

He released his debut solo album, Innu Town, in 1997. A few years later, he was seriously injured in a car accident. He released his second album, Pishimuss ("Little Moon" or "December"), in 2004.

After two years of "rediscovering his talent", McKenzie made a recording comeback in 2009 with the album Inniu ("He is reborn") with Montreal producer Ulysse Personne (Les Editions Embruns) who offered McKenzie to record this album with his ex-partner of the group Kashtin, Florent Vollant. Ulysse Personne also helped McKenzie to write the only French song of the album, "Nous". There is also an English song, "Away". All other songs are written in Innu, a native language found in the province of Québec as well as Newfoundland and Labrador; as was the case for the three albums recorded by Kashtin in the late 1980s and early 1990s.

== Discography ==
=== Albums ===
Year	Album
1997	Innu Town
2004	Pishimuss
2009	Inniu
2022	Mukuuin

=== Singles ===
Year	Single	CAN AC	Album
1996	"Innu Town"	—	Innu Town
1997	"Taste of Tears"	51	Innu Town
