= Shauit =

Canadian singer-songwriter

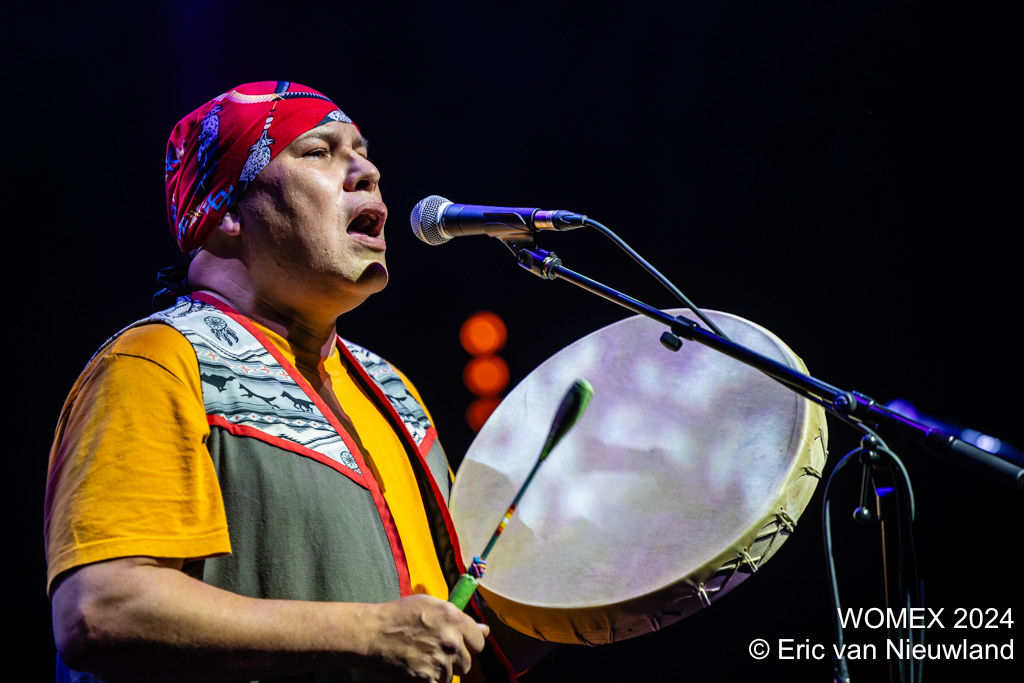
- Shauit performing at WOMEX 2024
- Born: Maliotenam, Quebec
- Occupations: Singer, songwriter
- Writing career
- Language: French, Innu-aimun
- Genres: Reggae, Soul music

Shauit is a Canadian singer-songwriter, who blends traditional First Nations music, primarily in the Innu-aimun language, with pop-rock and reggae music.

Originally from Maliotenam, Quebec, he is the son of an Acadian father and an Innu mother. He was raised francophone, and had virtually no knowledge of the Innu language until learning it as a teenager in a bid to reconnect with his indigenous heritage.

He first became known as a frequent collaborator with rapper Samian, appearing as a featured guest performer on several of Samian's singles. He released his debut EP as a solo recording artist in 2016, and followed up with his full-length debut album Apu Peikussiak^{u} in 2017.

== Awards ==
In 2018 he won an Indigenous Music Award for Best Indigenous-Language Album, and won the Canadian Folk Music Award for Indigenous Songwriter of the Year at the 14th Canadian Folk Music Awards.

He is a two-time Félix Award nominee for Indigenous Artist of the Year, receiving nods at the 41st Félix Awards in 2019 and at the 42nd Félix Awards in 2020.
