= Innu =

First Nation on the Labrador Peninsula

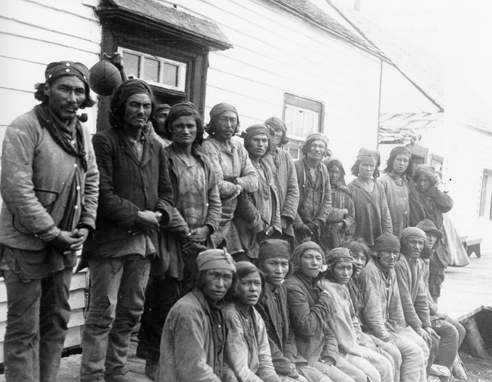
- Innu traders outside the Hudson's Bay Company trading post in Davis Inlet, Newfoundland and Labrador, 1903

Total population
- 28,960 (2021 census)

Regions with significant populations
- Canada

Languages
- Innu-aimun, Naskapi, English, French

Religion
- Christianity, other

Related ethnic groups
- Cree, Algonquin people, Naskapi, Atikamekw

Innu, Ilnu / assi "person" / "land"
- Person: Innu / Ilnu
- People: Innut / Innuat / Ilnuatsh
- Language: Innu-aimun
- Country: Nitassinan

The Innu (the singular form of Innut, meaning "people"), also known as the Montagnais (/ˌmɔːntənˈjɛ/; French for "mountain people"), are an Indigenous Canadian people inhabiting northeastern Labrador and some portions of Quebec. They refer to their traditional homeland as Nitassinan ("our land") or Innu-assi ("Innu land").

The ancestors of the modern First Nations were known to have lived on these lands as hunter-gatherers for many thousands of years. To support their seasonal hunting migrations, they created portable tents made of animal skins. Their subsistence activities were historically centred on hunting and trapping caribou, moose, deer, and small game.

The Innu language is spoken throughout Nitassinan, with certain dialect differences. It is part of the Cree–Montagnais–Naskapi dialect continuum, and is unrelated to the Inuit languages of other nearby peoples.

The Innu are broadly divided into the Montagnais in the forested south and the Naskapi in the north. The groups differ in dialect and partly also in their way of life and culture. Today, about 28,960 people of Innu origin live in various Indian settlements and reserves in Quebec and Labrador.

== Montagnais, Naskapi or Innu ==
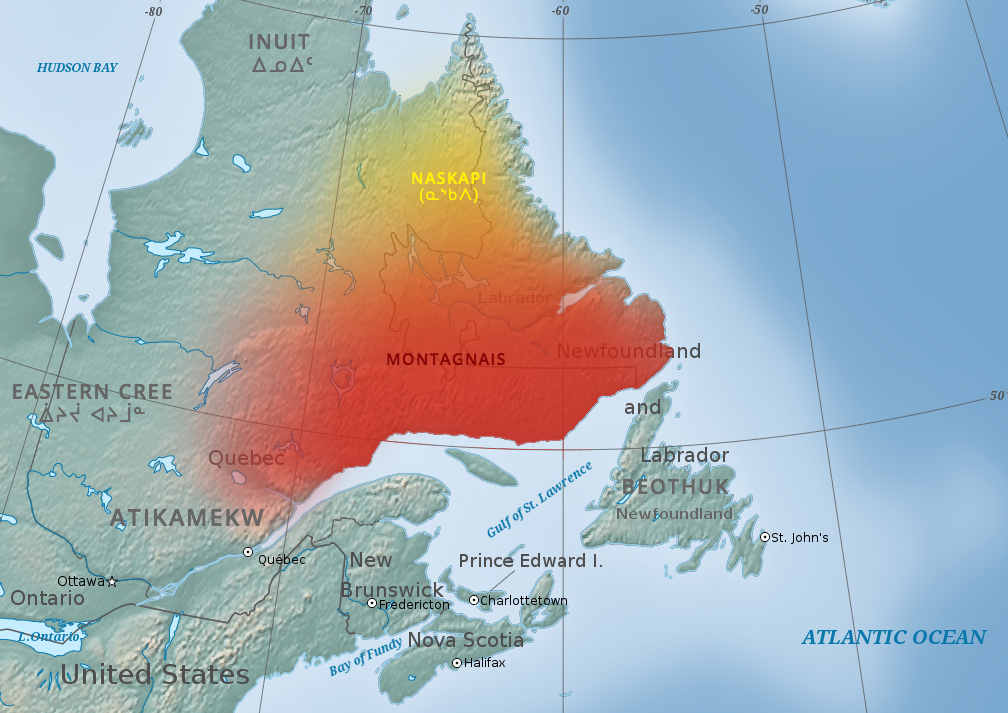
Lands traditionally inhabited by the Innu. Naskapi land is shown in yellow and Montagnais land in red

The people are frequently classified by the geography of their primary locations:

- the Neenoilno, live along the north shore of the Gulf of St. Lawrence, in Quebec; they have historically been referred to by Europeans as Montagnais (French for "mountain people", English pronunciation: /ˌmɔːntənˈjeɪ/), or Innu proper (Nehilaw and Ilniw – "people")
- The Naskapi (also known as Innu and Iyiyiw), live farther north, on the barren grounds of the subarctic, and are less numerous. The Innu recognize several distinctions among their people (e.g. Mushuau Innuat, Maskuanu, Uashau Innuat) based on different regional affiliations and speakers of various dialects of the Innu language.
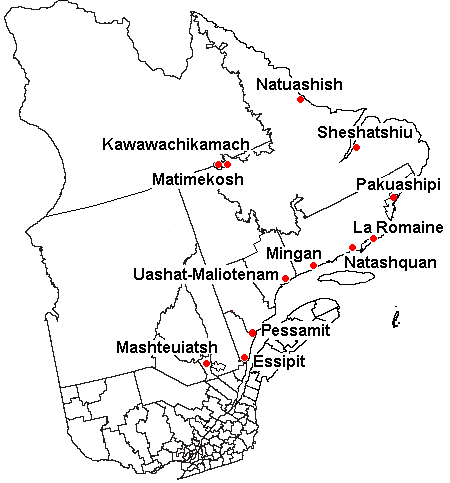
  Innu communities of Quebec and Labrador and the two Naskapi communities (Kawawachikamach and Natuashish)

The word Naskapi was first recorded by French colonists in the 17th century. They applied it to distant Innu groups who were beyond the reach of Catholic missionary influence. It was particularly applied to those people living in the lands that bordered Ungava Bay and the northern Labrador coast, near the Inuit communities of northern Quebec and northern Labrador. Gradually it came to refer to the people known today as the Naskapi First Nation.

All Innu groups were traditionally nomadic. The Montagnais moved within the forested south of the peninsula, while the Naskapi ranged over the barren lands of the north.

The Mushuau Innuat (plural), while related to the Naskapi, formed a separate group in the 1900s. They were subject to a government relocation program at Davis Inlet. Some of the families of the Naskapi Nation of Kawawachikamach have close relatives in the Cree village of Whapmagoostui, on the eastern shore of Hudson Bay.

Innu, which means "people" in Innu-aimun, has become the predominant term for the people as a whole; since about 1990, the Montagnais have generally chosen to be officially referred to as Innu, while the Naskapi have continued to use the word Naskapi.

== Innu communities ==
=== Labrador communities ===
Innu First Nations in Labrador
| Peoples (Note: Although Sheshatshiu and Natuashish are home to most of the province's Innu people, some also live in Labrador City, Wabush, Happy Valley-Goose Bay, St. John's, and elsewhere.) | Population (2026) | Reserve or Settlement | On reserve population (2026) | Reserve area | | |
| Peoples | Population (2026) | Reserve or Settlement | On reserve population (2026) | ha | acre | sq mi |
|---|---|---|---|---|---|---|
| Mushuau Innu First Nation | 1,268 | Natuashish 2 (Note: The residents were originally from Davis Inlet, about 15 km (9.3 mi) away, and relocated here in December 2002.) | 1,164 | 4,267.3 | 42.67 | 16.48 |
| Sheshatshiu Innu First Nation | 2,094 | Sheshatshiu | 1,852 | 804 | 8.04 | 3.10 |

=== Quebec communities ===
==== Conseil tribal Mamit Innuat ====
About 3,800 members

Mamit Innuat member communities
| Peoples | Population (2026) | Reserve or Settlement | On reserve population (2026) | Reserve area | | |
| Peoples | Population (2026) | Reserve or Settlement | On reserve population (2026) | ha | acre | sq mi |
|---|---|---|---|---|---|---|
| Innus of Ekuanitshit | 741 | Mingan | 679 | 3,838 | 38.38 | 14.82 |
| Première Nation des Innus de Nutashkuan | 1,303 | Nutashkuan | 1,156 | 118.9 | 1.19 | 0.46 |
| Montagnais de Pakua Shipi (St-Augustin Indian Settlement) | 429 | Pakuashipi (Note: Located within the Municipality of Saint-Augustin) | 393 | 0 | 0 | 0 |
| Montagnais de Unamen Shipu | 1,298 | Romaine 2 (Note: Located within the municipality of Côte-Nord-du-Golfe-du-Saint-Laurent) | 1,212 | 69.4 | 0.69 | 0.27 |

==== Conseil tribal Mamuitun ====
About 24,800 members

Mamuitun member communities
| Peoples | Population (2026) | Reserve or Settlement | On reserve population (2026) | Reserve area | | |
| Peoples | Population (2026) | Reserve or Settlement | On reserve population (2026) | ha | acre | sq mi |
|---|---|---|---|---|---|---|
| Innu Nation of Matimekush-Lac John | 1,117 | Lac-John | 902 | 23.5 | 0.24 | 0.09 |
| Innu Nation of Matimekush-Lac John | 1,117 | Matimekosh 3 (Note: Located within the town of Schefferville) | 902 | 65.4 | 0.65 | 0.25 |
| Innu Takuaikan Uashat Mak Mani-Utenam | 5,270 | Maliotenam 27A | 3,733 | 527 | 5.27 | 2.03 |
| Innu Takuaikan Uashat Mak Mani-Utenam | 5,270 | Uashat 27 | 3,733 | 210 | 2.10 | 0.81 |
| Innue Essipit | 1,374 | Innue Essipit | 247 | 86.5 | 0.87 | 0.33 |
| Pekuakamiulnuatsh First Nation | 12,748 | Mashteuiatsh | 2,117 | 1,626.9 | 16.27 | 6.28 |
| Pessamit Innu Band | 4,331 | Betsiamites (Pessamit) | 2,869 | 25,205 | 252.05 | 97.32 |

==== Kawawachikamach ====
Naskapi Nation of Kawawachikamach
| Peoples | Population (2026) | Reserve or Settlement | On reserve population (2026) | Reserve area | | |
| Peoples | Population (2026) | Reserve or Settlement | On reserve population (2026) | ha | acre | sq mi |
|---|---|---|---|---|---|---|
| Naskapi Nation of Kawawachikamach | 825 | Kawawachikamach (Kawawachikamach (Naskapi village municipality)) | 716 | 0 | 0 | 0 |

== History ==
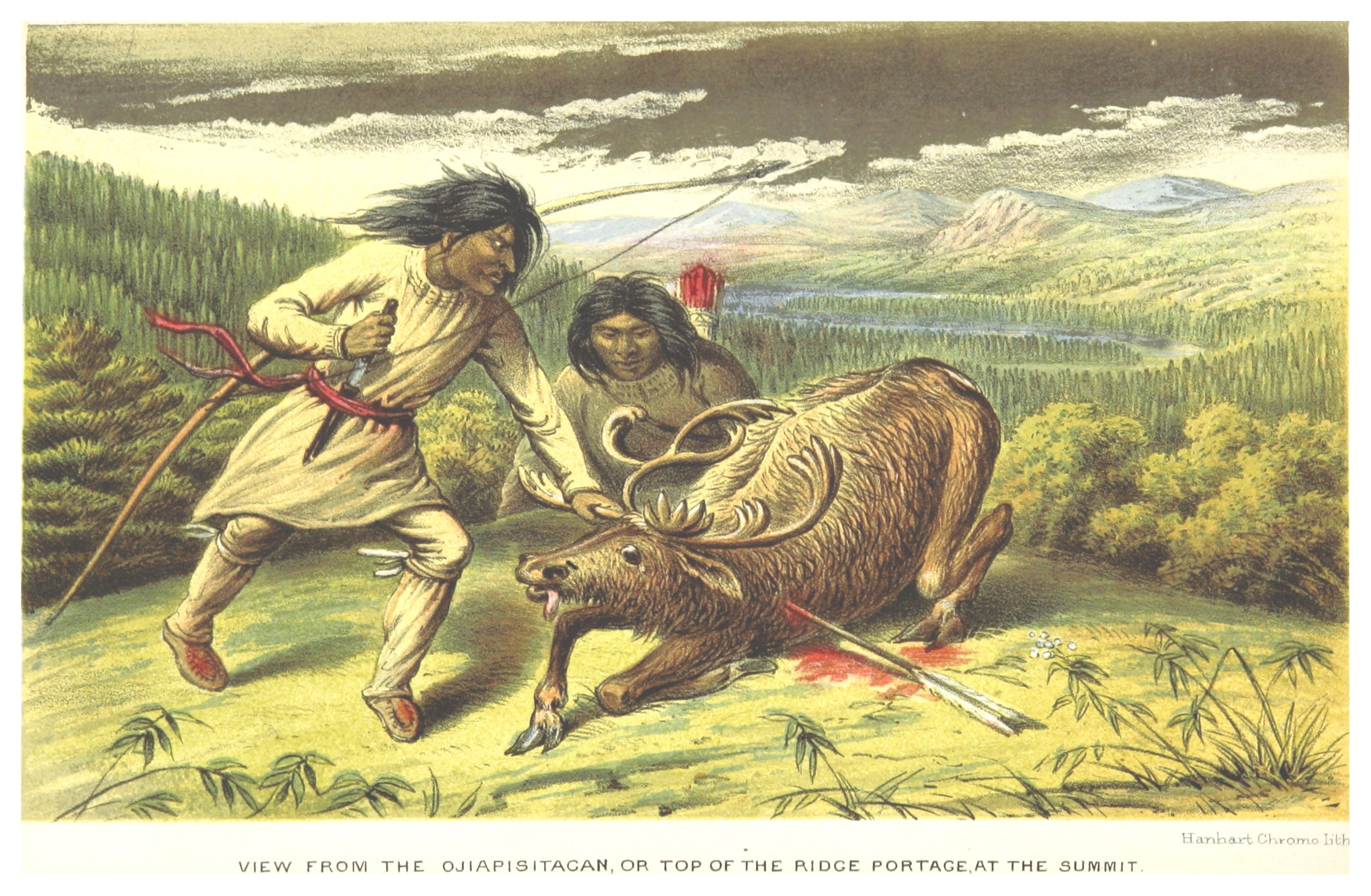
Reindeer hunting in Labrador

The Innu at times clashed with the Inuit, the Haudenosaunee, the Mi'kmaq and the Abenaki, but scholars do not describe them as a warlike people, and at least some of these hostilities were a side effect of European contact. In the Tadoussac region, the Innu were military allies of the French in their wars with the British and their Indigenous allies, and the Haudenosaunee raided into Innu territory during the Iroquois Wars of the 17th century.

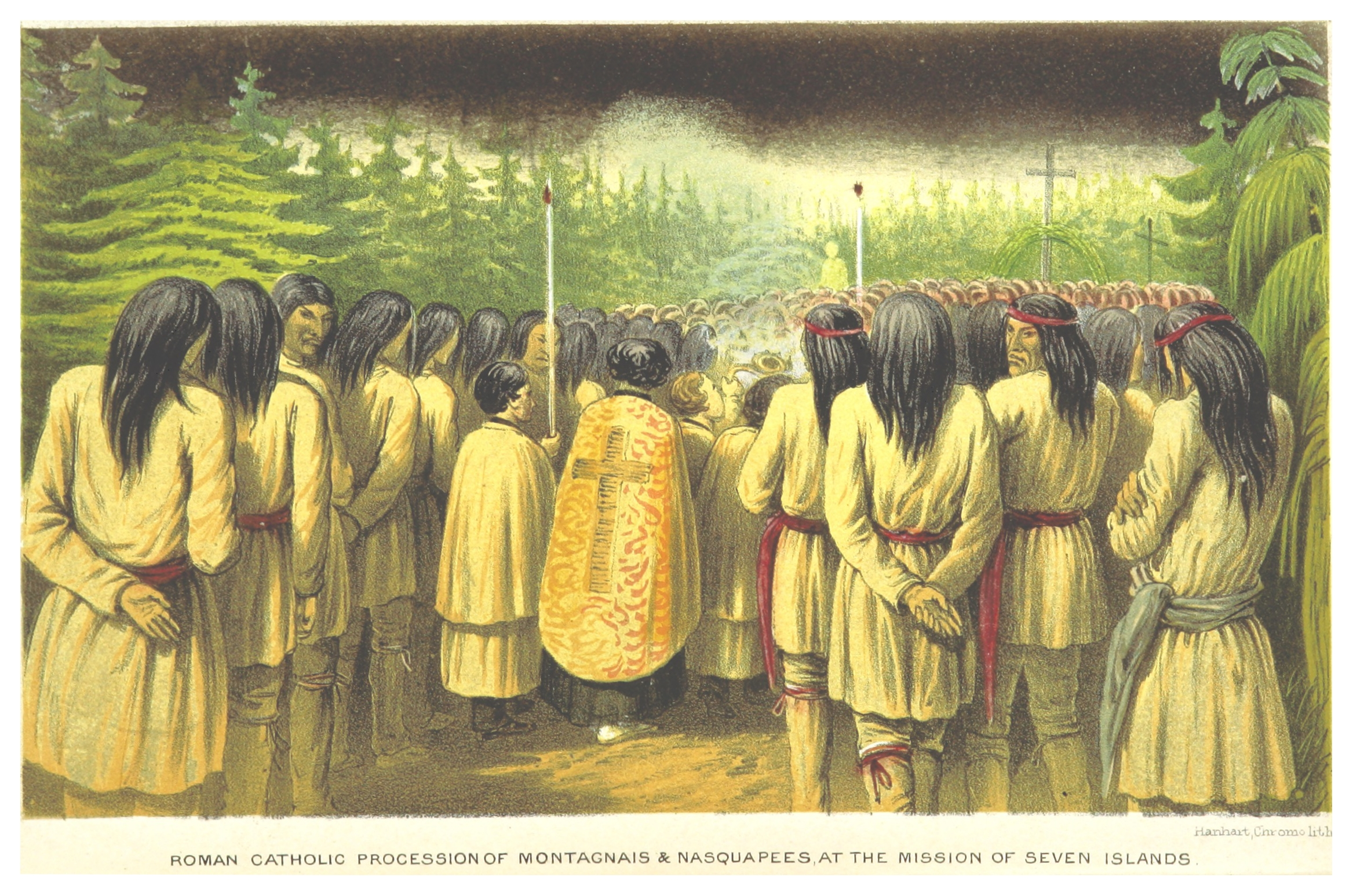
Roman Catholic procession of First Nations people in the Labrador peninsula

Innu oral tradition describes the original encounters of the Innu and the French explorers led by Samuel de Champlain as fraught with distrust. Neither group understood the language of the other, and the Innu were concerned about the motives of the French explorers.

The French asked permission to settle on the Innu's coastal land, which the Innu called Uepishtikueiau. This eventually developed as Quebec City. According to oral tradition, the Innu at first declined their request. The French demonstrated their ability to farm wheat on the land and promised they would share their bounty with the Innu in the future, which the Innu accepted.

Two distinct versions of the oral history describe the outcome. In the first, the French used gifts of farmed food and manufactured goods to encourage the Innu to become dependent on them. Then, the French changed it to a mercantile relationship: trading these items to the Innu in exchange for furs. When the nomadic Innu went inland for the winter, the French increased the size and population of their settlement considerably, eventually completely displacing the Innu.

The second, and more widespread, version of the oral history describes a more immediate conflict. In this version, the Innu taught the French how to survive in their traditional lands. Once the French had learned enough to survive on their own, they began to resent the Innu. The French began to attack the Innu, who retaliated in an attempt to reclaim their ancestral territory. The Innu had a disadvantage in numbers and weaponry, and eventually began to avoid the area rather than risk further defeat. During this conflict, the French colonists took many Innu women as wives. French women did not immigrate to New France in the early period.

Champlain had formed an alliance with an Innu group in 1603, laying a foundation for later French–Indigenous relations. In June 1609 he set out with two other Frenchmen and a party of Wendat (Huron), Algonquin and Montagnais warriors, reaching the lake later named Lake Champlain in his honour. In late July, the party encountered a group of Haudenosaunee at Ticonderoga; according to the historian Marcel Trudel, Champlain killed two men in the engagement.

== Historical bands ==
The southern bands of the Montagnais-Naskapi were encountered by Europeans early in the seventeenth century while the northern ones, except for some on James Bay, were not well known until the nineteenth century.

The following are bands of the Montagnais-Naskapi in the 17th century:

- Bersimis, around the Bersimis River
- Chicoutimi, north of Chicoutimi
- Chisedec, around Seven Islands and around the Moise River
- Escoumains, around the Escoumains River
- Godbout, around the Godbout River
- Mistassini, around Lake Mistassini
- Nichikun, around Nichikun Lake
- Ouchestigouetch, at the heads of Manikuagan and Kaniapiskau Rivers.
- Oumamiwek (or Ste. Marguerite), west of the Ste. Marguerite River
- Papinachois, at the head of the Bersimis River and east of it
- Tadousac, west of the lower Saguenay River

By 1850, the Chisedec, Oumamiwek, and Papinachois had disappeared or been renamed, and many new bands in the north of Nitassinan were recorded:

- Barren Ground, on the middle course of the George River
- Big River, around the Great Whale and Fort George Rivers
- Davis Inlet, south of the Barren Ground band
- Eastmain, north of the Eastmain River.
- Kaniapiskau, at the head of the Kaniapiskau River
- Michikamau, around Michikamau Lake
- Mingan, on the Mingan River
- Musquaro (or Romaine), on the Olomanoshibo River
- Natashkwan, on the Natashkwan River
- Northwest River, north of Hamilton Inlet and on the Northwest River
- Petisikapau, in the country around Petisikapau Lake
- Rupert House, around Rupert Bay and the Rupert River
- St. Augustin, on the St. Augustin River
- Shelter Bay, around modern-day Shelter Bay
- Ungava, southwest of the Ungava Bay
- Waswanipi, on the Waswanipi River
- White Whale River, between Lake Minto and Little Whale River and eastward to the Kaniapiskau River

== Present status ==
The Innu of Labrador and those living on the north shore of the Gulf of St. Lawrence in the Canadian Shield region have never officially ceded their territory to Canada by way of treaty or other agreement. But, as European-Canadians began widespread forest and mining operations at the turn of the 20th century, the Innu became increasingly settled in coastal communities and in the interior of Quebec. The Canadian and provincial governments, the Catholic, Moravian, and Anglican churches, all encouraged the Innu to settle in more permanent, majority-style communities, in the belief that their lives would improve with this adaptation. This coercive assimilation resulted in the Innu giving up some traditional activities (hunting, trapping, fishing). Because of these social disruptions and the systemic disadvantages faced by Indigenous peoples, community life in the permanent settlements often became associated with high levels of substance abuse, domestic violence, and suicide among the Innu.

The flag of the Innu Nation was carried aboard the Artemis II mission that traveled further into space than any humans before this flight. Geological features of the Kamestastin crater in the nation's traditional hunting grounds was a training site for Canadian astronaut Jeremy Hansen.

=== Labrador Innu organizations and land claims ===
In 1999, Survival International published a study of the Innu communities of Labrador. It assessed the adverse effects of the Canadian government's relocating the people far from their ancestral lands and preventing them from practising their ancient way of life.

The Innu people of Labrador formally organized the Naskapi Montagnais Innu Association in 1976 to protect their rights, lands, and way of life against industrialization and other outside forces. The organization changed its name to the Innu Nation in 1990 and functions today as the governing body of the Labrador Innu. The group has won recognition for its members as status Indians under Canada's Indian Act in 2002 and is currently involved in land claim and self-governance negotiations with the federal and provincial governments.

In addition to the Innu Nation, residents at both Natuashish and Sheshatshiu elect Band Councils to represent community concerns. The chiefs of both councils sit on the Innu Nation's board of directors and the three groups work in cooperation with one another.

The Innu Nation's efforts to raise awareness about the environmental impacts of a mining project in Voisey's Bay were documented in Marjorie Beaucage's 1997 film Ntapueu ... i am telling the truth.

=== Davis Inlet, Labrador ===
In the 1999 study of Innu communities in Labrador, Survival International concluded that government policies violated contemporary international law in human rights, and drew parallels with the treatment of Tibetans by the People's Republic of China. The study described the Innu as suffering the highest suicide rate in the world.

By 2000, the Innu island community of Davis Inlet asked the Canadian government to assist with a local addiction public health crisis. At their request, the community was relocated to a nearby mainland site, now known as Natuashish. At the same time, the Canadian government created the Natuashish and Sheshatshiu band councils under the Indian Act.

=== Kawawachikamach, Quebec ===
Having been excluded from the agreement in principle that led to the James Bay and Northern Quebec Agreement of 1975, the Naskapi Nation of Kawawachikamach negotiated a separate comprehensive land claims settlement, the Northeastern Quebec Agreement, in 1978. It provided the Naskapi with self-government concessions and $9 million over 20 years in exchange for development rights. As a consequence, the Naskapi of Kawawachikamach are no longer subject to certain provisions of the Indian Act; the Innu communities of Quebec remain subject to the Act.

=== New York Power Authority controversy ===
The New York Power Authority's proposed contract in 2009 with the province of Quebec to buy power from its extensive hydroelectric dam facilities has generated controversy, because it was dependent on construction of a new dam complex and transmission lines that would have interfered with the traditional ways of the Innu. According to the Sierra Club:

[t]he "New York Power Authority is in preliminary discussions and considering the liability of a new contract with Hydro Quebec," a Canadian supplier of hydroelectricity.

— Legislative Gazette

The Innu community, the Sierra Club, and the National Lawyers Guild are fighting to prevent this proposed contract, which would have to be approved by New York's Governor, under his regulatory authority. The problem is that construction of required electric transmission lines would hinder the Innu's hunting-gathering-fishing lifestyle:

Chief Georges-Ernest Grégoire of the Innu community in Eastern Quebec urged the governor not to proceed with a plan to buy hydroelectric power from Canada, saying the dam complex that would be built would affect the traditional way of life for his people.

— Legislative Gazette (caption for a photo of Chief Grégoire)

Chief Grégoire's comments at a press conference in Albany, New York were translated, but whether from French or Innu-aimun is not clear.

=== Natuashish and Sheshatshiu, Newfoundland and Labrador ===
Innu have only been in Sheshatshiu since fur trading posts were established by the Hudson's Bay Company in North West River in the mid-1700s and only in Davis Inlet / Natuashish since 1771, when the Moravian Church set up the first mission at Nuneingoak on the Labrador coast. Danny Williams, the then Premier of Newfoundland and Labrador struck a deal on September 26, 2008, with Labrador's Innu to permit construction of Muskrat Falls Generating Station, a hydroelectric megaproject to proceed on the proposed Lower Churchill site. They also negotiated compensation for the existing project on the Upper Churchill, where large tracts of traditional Innu hunting lands had been flooded in the 1960s. The agreement was called the Tshash Petapen ("New Dawn") Agreement.

== Culture ==
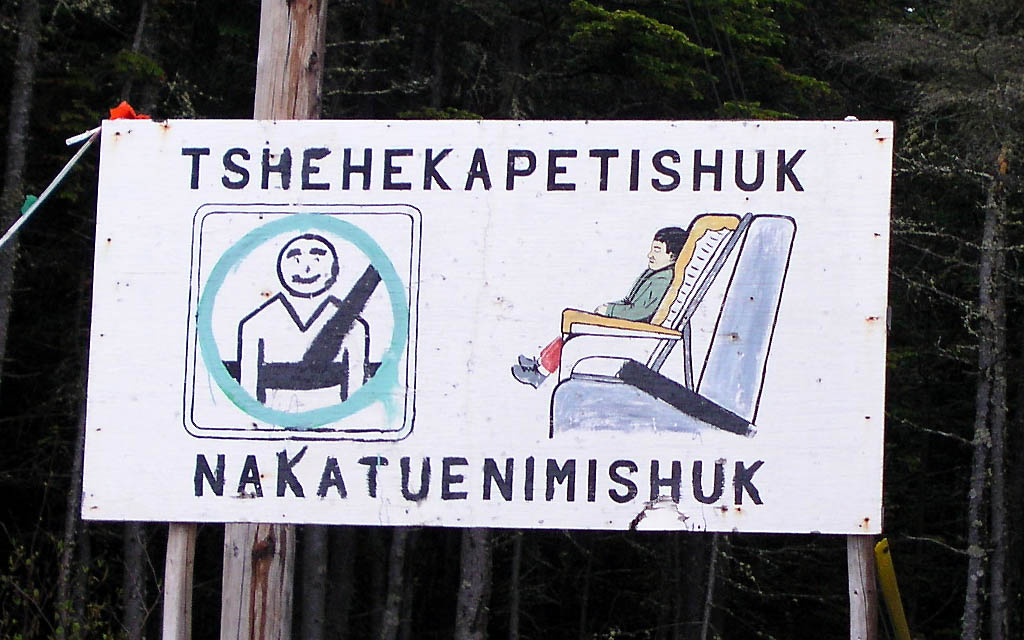
"Buckle up your children" sign in Innu-aimun language, in the Pointe-Parent reserve near Natasquan, Quebec.

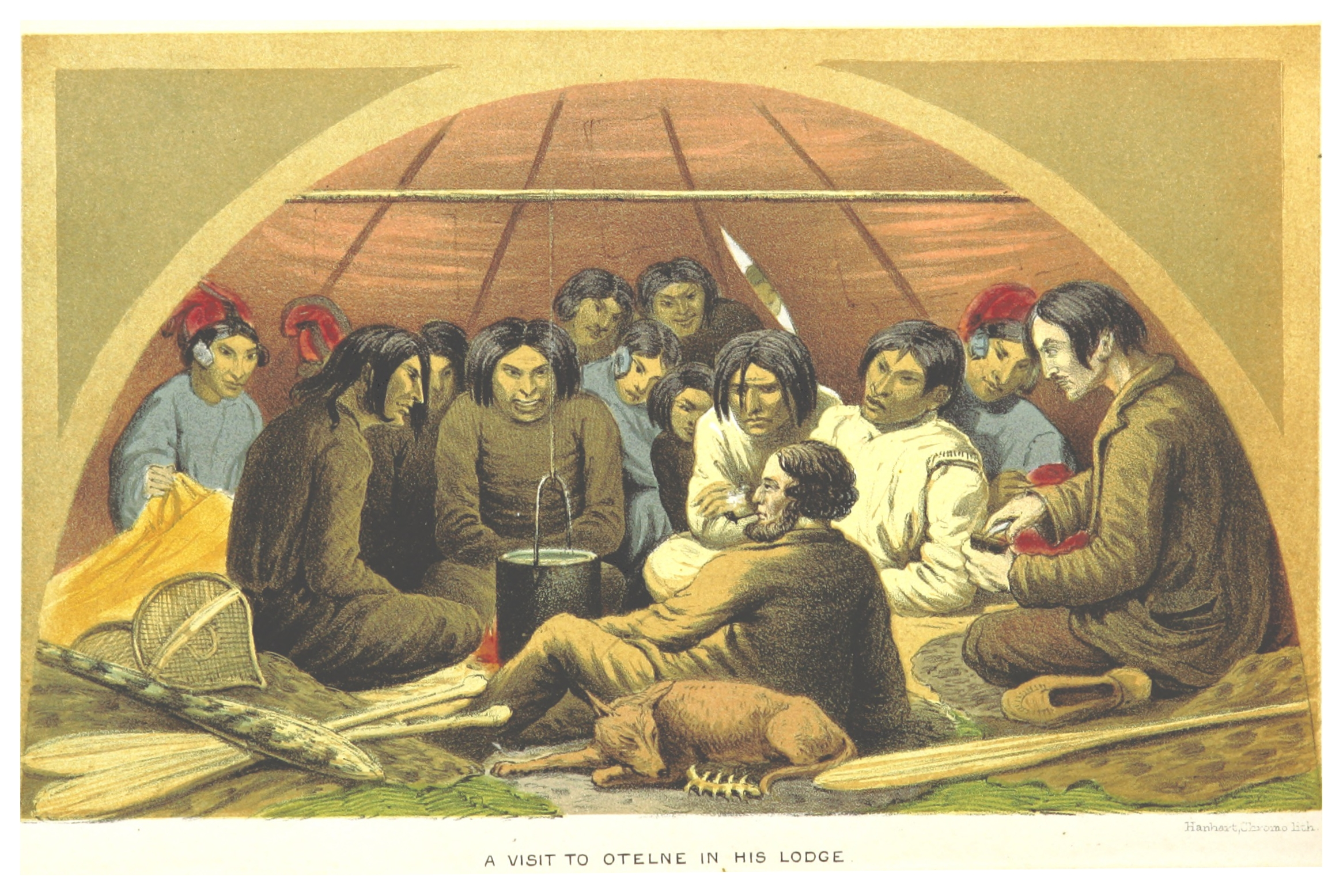
Housing

=== Ethnobotany ===
The Innu people grate the inner bark of Abies balsamea (balsam fir) and eat it to benefit the diet.

=== Traditional crafts ===
Traditional Innu craft is demonstrated in the Innu tea doll. These children's toys originally served a dual purpose for nomadic Innu tribes. When travelling vast distances over challenging terrain, the people left nothing behind. They believed that "Crow" would take it away. Everyone, including young children, helped to transport essential goods. Innu women made intricate dolls from caribou hides and scraps of cloth. They filled the dolls with tea and gave them to young girls to carry on long journeys. The girls could play with the dolls while also carrying important goods. Every able-bodied person carried something. Men generally carried the heavier bags and women would carry young children.

=== Traditional clothing, style and accessories ===
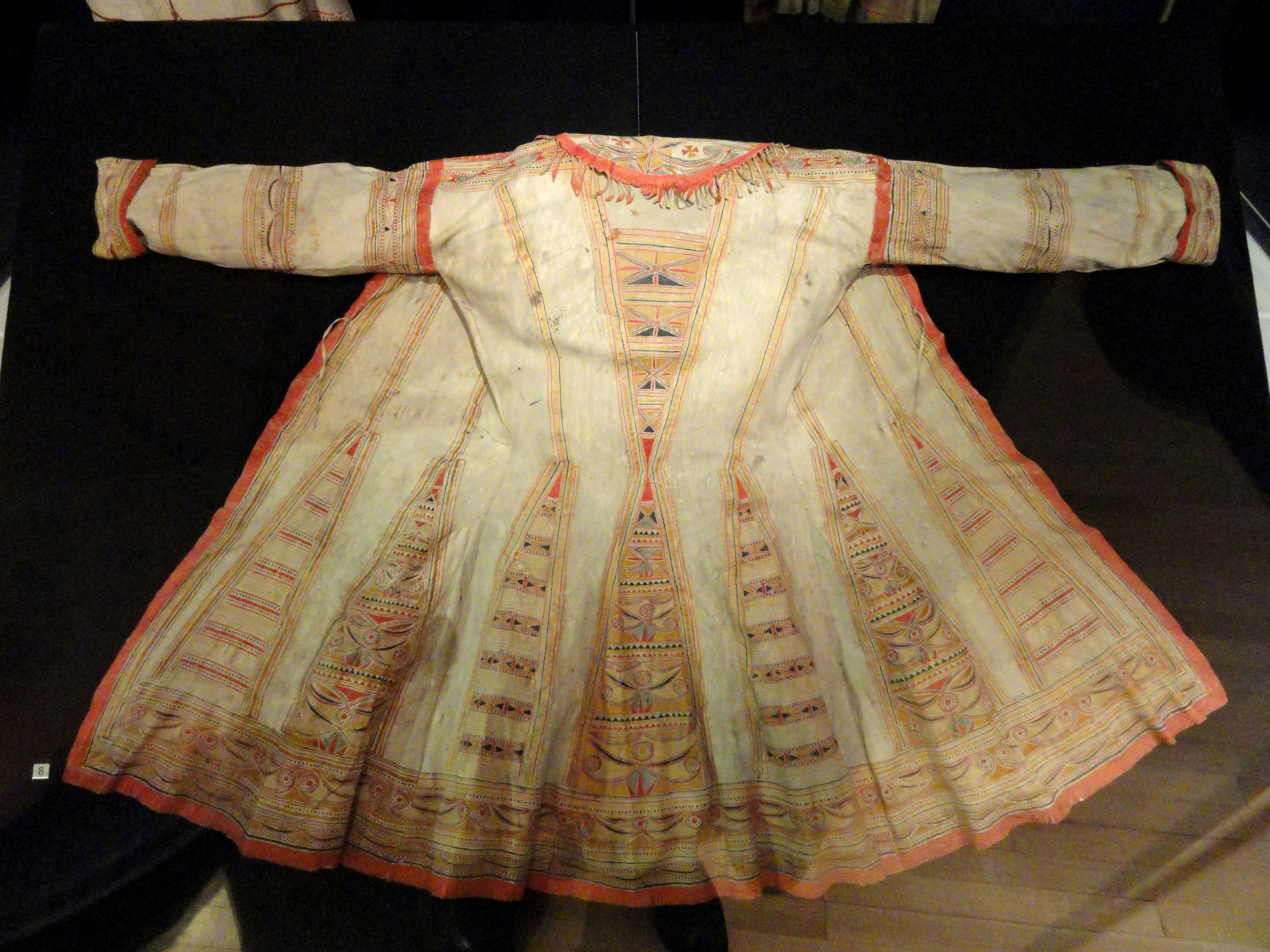
Painted caribou-skin coat, Innu, Quebec–Labrador peninsula, c. 1805 (Royal Ontario Museum)

Innu craft makers decorated caribou skins with painted or quill designs to make many kinds of clothing. Men wore caribou pants and boots with a buckskin long shirt, all made by women. With the introduction of trade cloth from the French and English, people began replacing the buckskin shirts with ones made of cloth. Most still wore boots and pants made from caribou hide. Women wore long dresses of buckskin. Contemporary Innu women have often replaced these with manufactured pants and jackets. Women traditionally wore their hair long or in two coils. Men wore theirs long.

Both genders wore necklaces made of bone and bead. Smoke pipes were used by both genders, marked for women as shorter. If a man killed a bear, it was a sign of joy and initiation into adulthood and the man would wear a necklace made from the bear's claws.

=== Housing ===
The Innu traditionally lived in wigwams, covered with birchbark in the south and with caribou hide in the north. In modern homes, the hearth has been replaced by a metal stove in the centre of the house.

=== Traditional foods ===
The Innu hunted caribou in the east and north of their territory and moose in the west, as well as beaver, bear, lake fish and salmon; they also fished for eels, hunted seals, and gathered roots, berries and maple sap. Animals traditionally eaten included moose, caribou, porcupine, rabbits, marten, woodchuck, squirrel; Canada goose, snow goose, brants, ducks, teal, loons, spruce grouse, woodcock, snipe, passenger pigeons, ptarmigan; whitefish, lake trout, salmon, Arctic char, seal (naskapi) pike, walleye, suckerfish (Catostomidae), sturgeon, catfish, lamprey, and smelt. Fish were eaten roasted or smoke-dried. Moose meat and several types of fish were also smoked. Oat bannock, introduced by the French in the 16th century, became a staple and Indigenous bannock is still eaten today. Meat was eaten frozen, raw or roasted, and caribou was sometimes boiled in a stew. Pemmican was made with moose or caribou.

Plants traditionally eaten included raspberries, blueberries, strawberries, cherries, wild grapes, hazelnuts, crab apples, red martagon bulbs, Indian potato, and maple-tree sap for sweetening. Cornmeal was traded with other First Nations peoples, such as the Iroquois, Algonquin, and Abenaki, and made into apon (cornbread), which sometimes also included oat or wheat flour when it became available. Pine needle tea was meant to keep away infections and colds resulting from the harsh weather.

=== Buckskin ===
Traditionally, buckskin leather was a most important material used for clothing, boots, moccasins, house covers and storage. Women prepared the hides and many of the products made from it. They scraped the hides to remove all fur, then left them outside to freeze. The next step was to stretch the hide on a frame. They rubbed it with a mixture of animal brain and pine needle tea to soften it. The dampened hide was formed into a ball and left overnight. In the morning, it would be stretched again, then placed over a smoker to smoke and tan it. The hide was left overnight. The finished hide was called buckskin.

=== Mythology ===
Pre-colonial Innu religion encouraged respect for animals. The caribou, which provided most of the necessities of life, was the most revered animal; shamans performed shaking tent rites, and hunters appeased animal spirits with offerings of bones and skulls placed in trees or on raised platforms. The oral traditions of the Innu are noted as similar to those of other Cree-speaking cultures. Of particular relevance is Tshakapesh, a lunar folk hero.

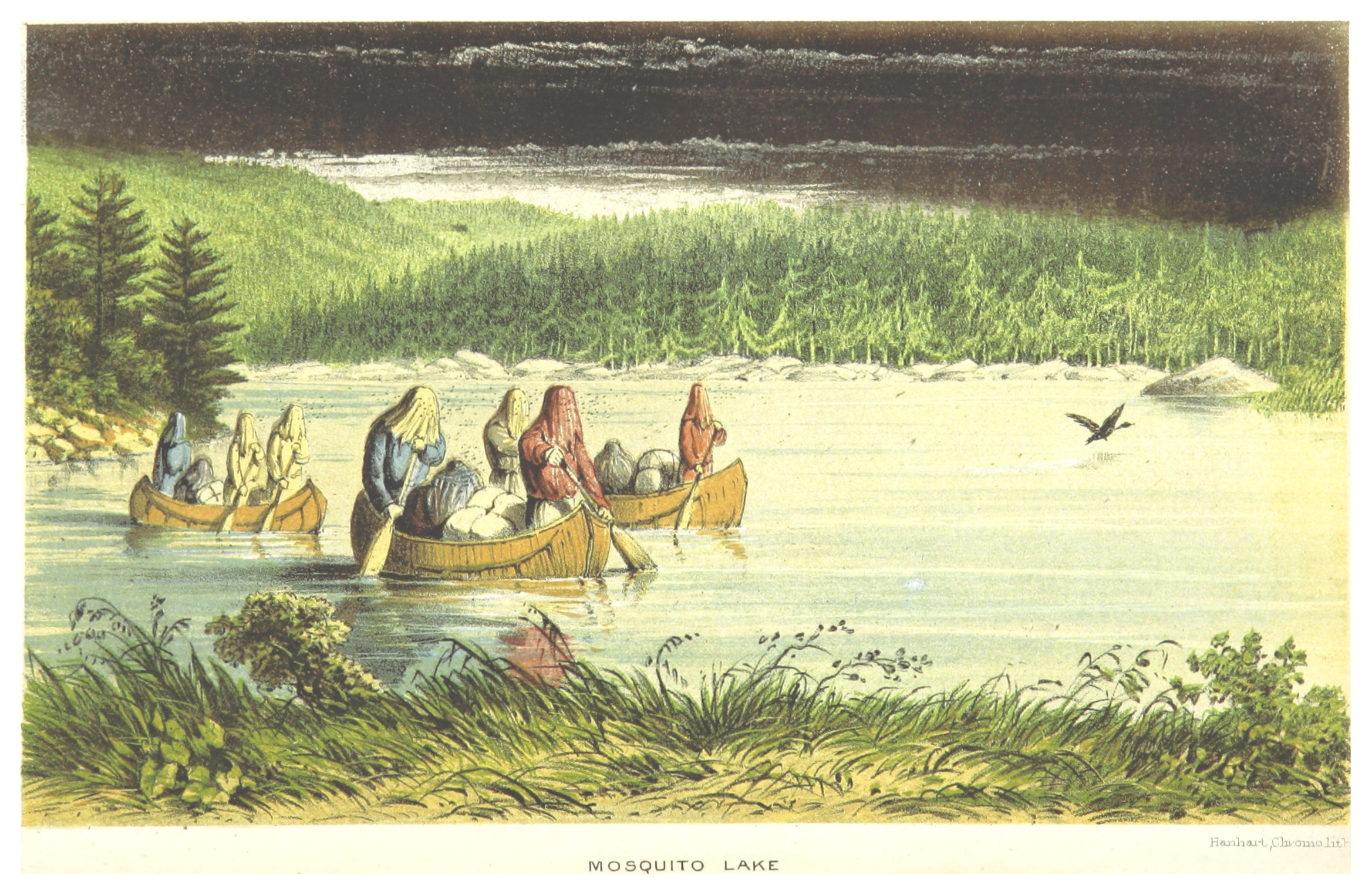
Canoes

The spirits they believed in are Caribou Master, Atshen, and Matshishkapeu.

=== Film and television ===
The Innu people were profiled in Carcajou et le péril blanc (Kauapishit Miam Kuakuatshen Etentakuess), a documentary film series by Arthur Lamothe which were among the first films in the history of cinema to depict indigenous peoples speaking their own languages.

Other important later films set in Innu communities have included the narrative feature films Le Dep, Mesnak and Kuessipan, and the documentary films Innu Nikamu: Resist and Sing and Call Me Human.

== Transportation ==
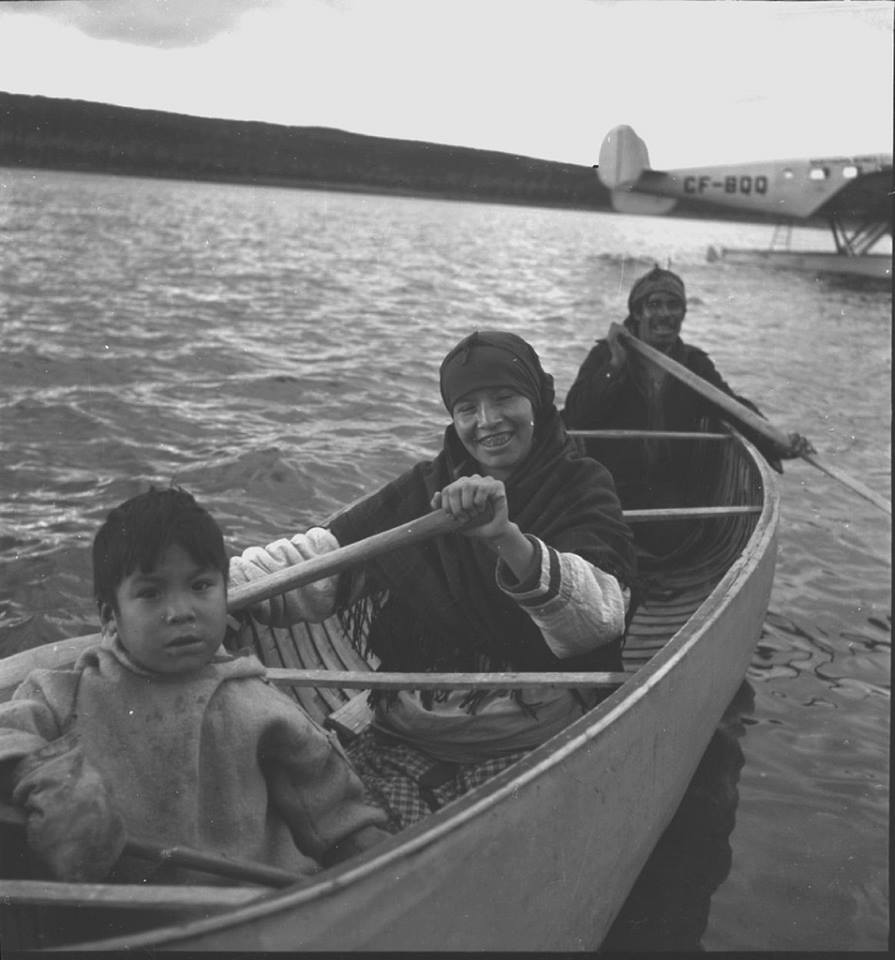
An Innu family travelling by canoe, 1941

The Innu traditionally travelled by canoe in summer and by snowshoe and toboggan in winter. While people still walk and use snowshoes where necessary for hunting or trapping, many Innu communities rely heavily on trucks, SUVs, and cars; in northern Innu communities, people use snowmobiles for hunting and general transportation.

== Notable people ==
- An Antane-Kapesh, writer
- Joséphine Bacon, poet
- Jani Bellefleur-Kaltush, filmmaker
- Bernard Cleary, politician
- Naomi Fontaine, writer
- Sharon Fontaine-Ishpatao, actress
- Jonathan Genest-Jourdain, politician
- Michel Jean, journalist and writer
- Jean-Luc Kanapé, conservationist and actor
- Natasha Kanapé Fontaine, writer
- Kanen, musician
- Carole Labarre, writer
- Matiu, musician
- Claude McKenzie, musician (Kashtin)
- Geneviève McKenzie-Sioui, musician
- Rita Mestokosho, poet
- Peter Penashue, politician
- Scott-Pien Picard, musician
- Laurie Rousseau-Nepton, astrophysicist
- Shauit, musician
- Florent Vollant, musician (Kashtin)

== See also ==
- Violence against indigenous women
- Missing and Murdered Indigenous Women

== General bibliography ==
- Rogers, Edward S., and Leacock, Eleanor (1981). "Montagnais-Naskapi". In J. Helm (Ed.), Handbook of North American Indians: Subarctic (Vol. 6, pp. 169–189). Washington: Smithsonian Institution.
