= Alexandra Stréliski =

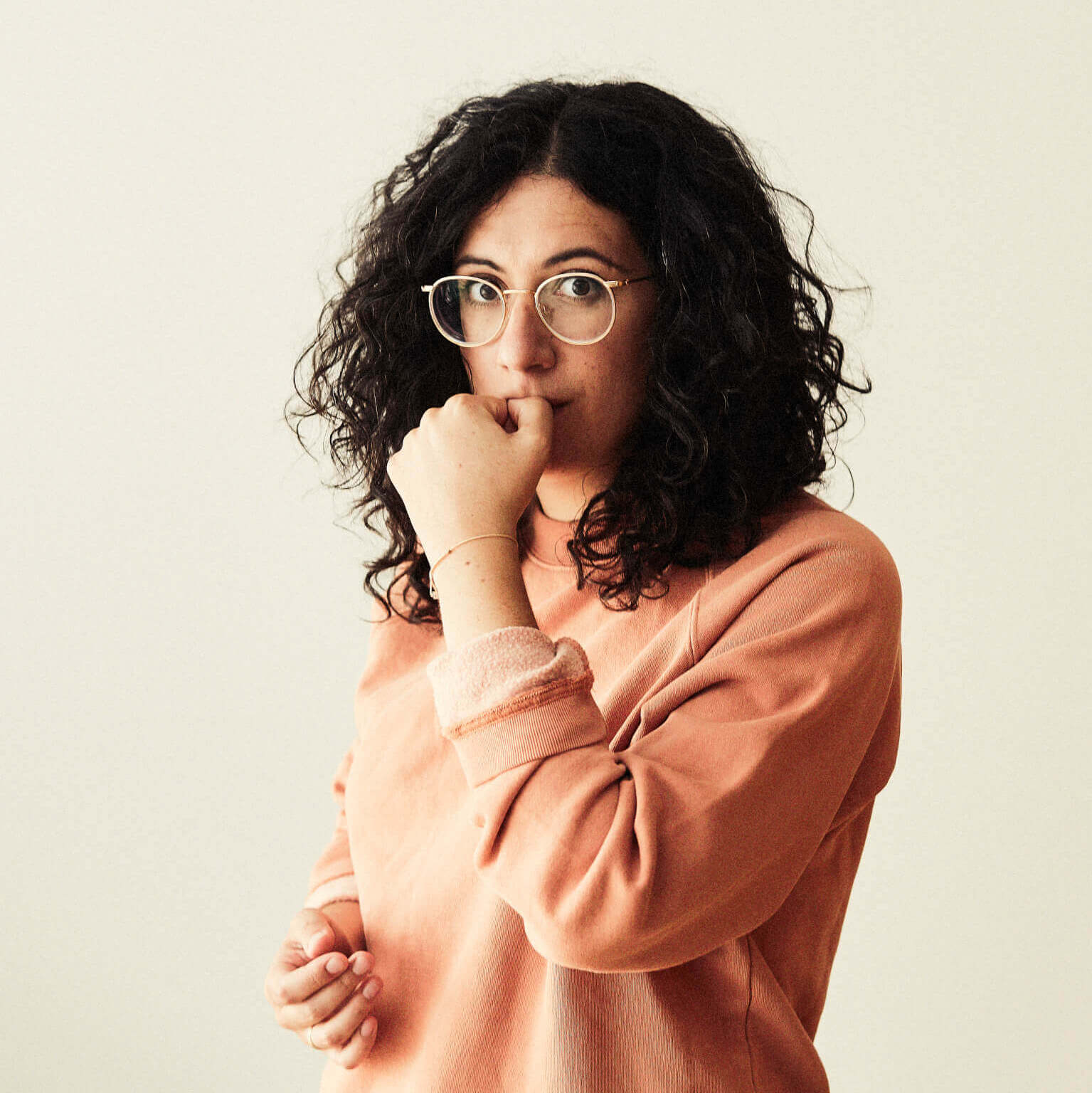
- Credit: Raphaël Ouellet

Background information
- Born: 1985 (age 40–41); Montreal, Quebec, Canada
- Genres: Neo-classical
- Occupation: Composer
- Instrument: Piano
- Website: www.alexandrastreliski.com

Alexandra Stréliski is a Canadian neo-classical composer and pianist based in Quebec. She has released three albums: Pianoscope (2010), Inscape (2018) and Néo-Romance (2023).

== Early life ==
Stréliski was born in Montreal, Quebec and is of Polish Jewish descent. After living a few years in Paris, she returned to Montréal where she studied at Collège international Marie de France, McGill University and Université de Montréal.

Stréliski is the sister of Montreal-based comedian and writer Léa Streliski and Mathieu Stréliski.

== Career ==
Stréliski released her debut album, Pianoscope, in 2010. Songs from the album have appeared in several films and movies, specifically those by Canadian director Jean-Marc Vallée. This includes the Dallas Buyers Club, Demolition, and Big Little Lies. She collaborated with Vallée to create new compositions for the HBO miniseries Sharp Objects.

Her second album, Inscape, was released in 2018; it was long-listed for the 2019 Polaris Music Prize. Inscape was the number one classical album on Apple Music at the end of 2018 in the United States and two of the tracks have reached over 20 million streams on Spotify. It was named number 9 on Exclaim's Top 10 Experimental & Modern Composition Albums released in 2018. In December 2019, she received two Felix Awards for "Author or Composer of the Year" and "Revelation of the Year". She was nominated for three awards at the 2020 Juno Awards, for Album of the Year, Breakthrough Artist of the Year, and Instrumental Album of the Year.

Her album Néo-Romance was longlisted for the 2023 Polaris Music Prize.

== Discography ==
Albums

- Pianoscope (2010)
- Inscape (2018)
- Néo-Romance (2023) – No. 2 Canadian Albums Chart
