= Scott-Pien Picard =

- Born: Uashat-Maliotenam, Quebec, Canada
- Genres: Folk; pop
- Member of: Nikamu Mamuitun collective
- Website: nikamowin.com/en/artist/scott-pien-picard

Scott-Pien Picard is an Innu singer-songwriter from Uashat-Maliotenam, Quebec. He is most noted as a three-time Felix Award nominee for Indigenous Artist of the Year, receiving nods at the 42nd Félix Awards in 2020, the 43rd Félix Awards in 2021, and the 44th Félix Awards in 2022.

Picard released his self-titled debut album in 2018. The album received widespread attention for "Atikamekw-Innu", a duet with Atikamekw singer-songwriter Ivan Boivin-Flamand which featured lyrics in both the Innu and Atikamekw languages.

In 2020 he was the winner of the Talents bleus competition on La semaine des 4 Julie, winning $100,000 which he invested in the recording of his second album. In November 2021 he released the album's lead single "Ka Minuatituiaku", with the full album slated for release in January 2022.

He has been a member of Florent Vollant's Nikamu Mamuitun collective, alongside Marcie Michaud-Gagnon, Joëlle St-Pierre, Chloé Lacasse, Matiu, Kanen, Cédrik St-Onge and Ivan Boivin,
