= Bleu Jeans Bleu =

Canadian pop country and rock music group

- Origin: Montreal, Quebec, Canada
- Genres: pop, rock, country, comedy music
- Years active: 2012–present
- Members: Mathieu "Claude Cobra" Lafontaine; François "Wayne Wrangler" Lessard; Mathieu "Lee Lou" Colette; Pierre-David "Jean Levis" Girard

Bleu Jeans Bleu are a Canadian pop music group from Quebec. They are most noted for winning the Prix Félix for Group of the Year at the 41st Felix Awards in 2019.

The group was formed in 2012 by Mathieu Lafontaine, separately from his solo work under the name Matt Track, as a side project recording and performing a comedic spin on country music; in the context of the band, all of its members perform under stage names derived from brands of denim jeans. They released the albums Haute couture in 2013 and Franchement wow in 2016, before breaking through to mass popularity in 2019 with the hit single "Coton ouaté", the lead single from their third album Perfecto. In addition to the band's Group of the Year win, Perfecto was a Prix Félix nominee for Album of the Year.

In October 2019, comedian Jean-Denis Scott released a parody, with the approval of Bleu Jeans Bleu, of "Coton ouaté" as a song about the 2019 Canadian federal election.

"Coton ouaté" was certified gold in February 2020. At her concert at Montreal's Bell Centre on February 19 during her Courage World Tour, Céline Dion invited Lafontaine on stage to perform "Coton ouaté" as a duet. The song was subsequently shortlisted for the 2020 SOCAN Songwriting Prize.

In 2020, they released the single "Le king de la danse en ligne", which featured a video compiled from clips submitted by people of themselves dancing at home during the lockdown phase of the COVID-19 pandemic in Canada. They received five Felix nominations at the 42nd Felix Awards, including group of the year, single of the year for "Coton ouaté", video of the year for "Le king de la danse en ligne", bestselling album of the year for Perfecto, and concert tour of the year.

== Discography ==
- Haute couture (2013)
- Franchement wow (2016)
- Perfecto (2019)
- Top Minou (2022)
- Record n°V (2026)
