= CRi =

Canadian musician

- Born: Christophe Dubé
- Origin: Quebec, Canada
- Genres: Electronic music
- Occupation: Musician
- Label: Anjunadeep
- Formerly of: Feuilles et Racines
- Website: crimusic.net

Christophe Dubé, known by his stage name CRi, is a Canadian electronic musician from Quebec.

Originally from Quebec City, he was a beatboxer for local hip hop group Feuilles et Racines before releasing his debut EP as an electronic artist in 2013. He released a number of standalone tracks and remixes for other artists before following up with the EPs Tell Her in 2016, Someone Else in 2017, and Initial in 2019.

In 2019, CRi and Charlotte Cardin collaborated on a cover of Daniel Bélanger's "Fous n'importe où". Juvenile, his first full-length album, was released in 2020 and included Bélanger as a guest vocalist on the track "Signal".

In 2023, CRi released his second studio album, Miracles, on which he collaborated with artists such as Half Moon Run and Klô Pelgag.

Someone Else was a nominee for Electronic Album of the Year at the Juno Awards of 2018, and Juvenile received a nomination in the same category at the Juno Awards of 2021. The same year, he won a Félix Award for Discovery of the Year at the 43rd ADISQ gala.

In 2026, he released the EP AMi Vol. 1, announcing that he would henceforth take a more collaborative approach to both making music and touring.

CRi is the brother of actress and filmmaker Alexa-Jeanne Dubé.

== Discography ==
Studio albums

- Juvenile (2020)
- Miracles (2023)

Remix albums

- Why I Love You (Remixes) (2016)
- Me and My Friends: Remixes (2016)
- Juvenile (Remixed) (2021)
- Juvenile (Remixed: Part Two) (2021)
- Miracles (Remixed) (2024)

EPs

- Tell Her (2016)
- Someone Else (2017)
- Initial EP (2019)
- Signal (2020)
- To You (2021)
- Astray (2023)
- Miroir Miroir (2023)
- Hold You (2024)
- AMi Vol. 1 (2026)
