= Natasha Kanapé Fontaine =

Canadian poet and actress

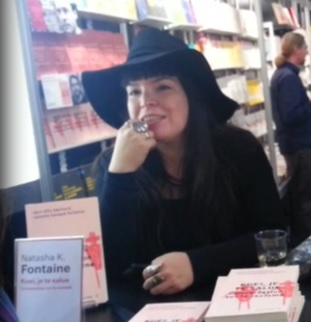
- Born: 1991 (age 34–35); Pessamit, Quebec
- Citizenship: Innu
- Occupations: Poet; Writer; Actress
- Website: Natashakanapefontaine.ca

Natasha Kanapé Fontaine (born 1991) is an Innu poet and actress. Born in Pessamit, Quebec, Fontaine first became noticed in 2012 as part of the Montreal poetry scene. Her first poetry collection, Do Not Enter My Soul in Your Shoes, earned her the 2013 Prize of the Society of Francophone Writers of America; her second, Manifeste Assi, was released in 2014 and debuted at the Étonnants Voyageurs festival. In 2016 she was a guest of honour at the Rimouski Book Fair, alongside Deni Ellis Béchard; the same year, the National Film Board of Canada announced funding for 3 projects as part of the 150th Anniversary of the founding of Canada, including #Legacies150, a photo-essay series Fontaine is contributing to.

From 2017 to 2019, Kanapé Fontaine played the role of "Eyota Standing Bear", a First Nations incarcerated criminal on the French-Canadian television drama Unité 9.

In 2021 she released the album Nui Pimuten I, which set some of her poetry to music. She received two Félix Award nominations at the 44th Félix Awards, for Revelation of the Year and Indigenous Artist of the Year.
