= Alaclair Ensemble =

Canadian hip hop musical collective

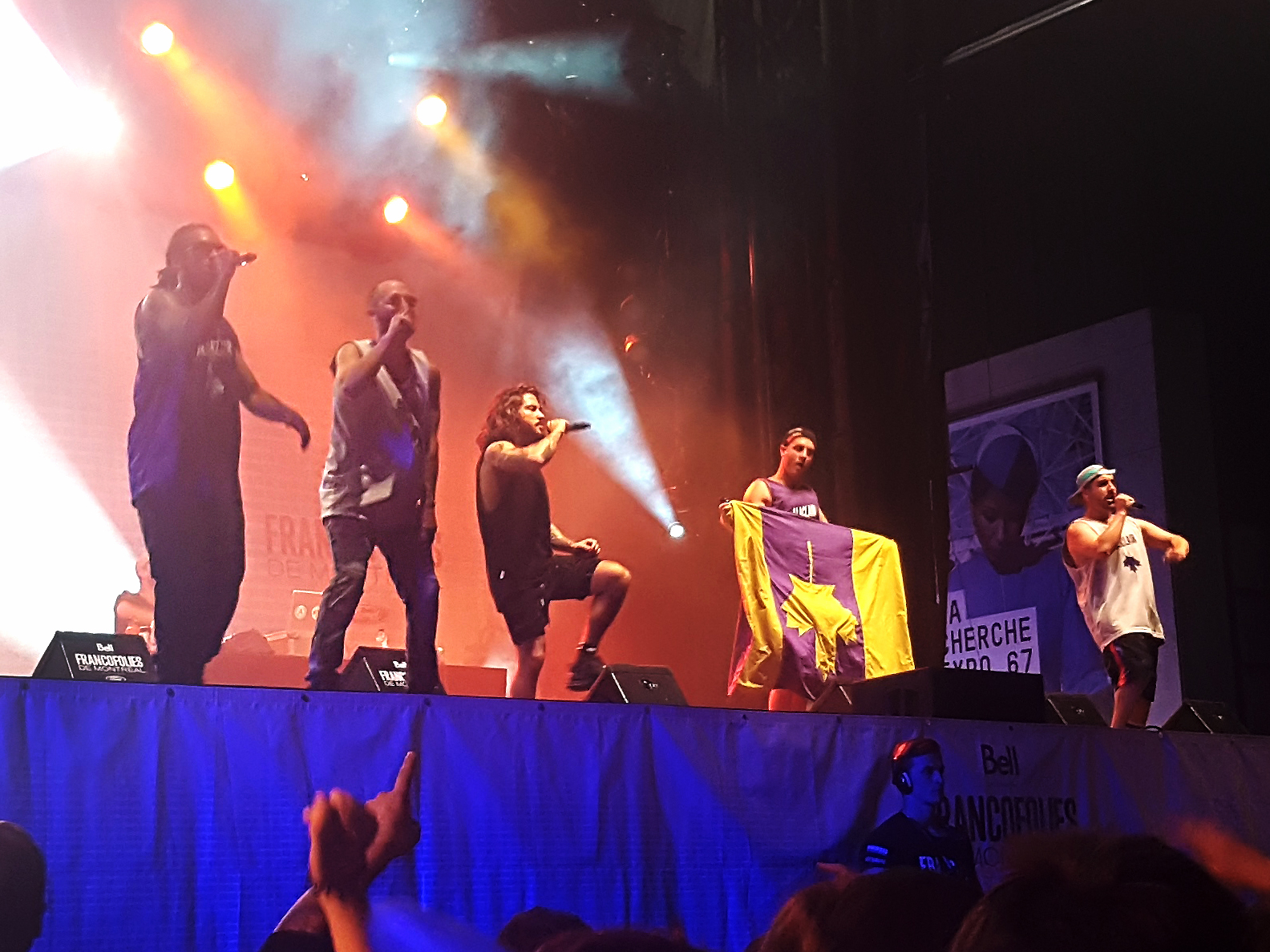
- Members of Alaclair Ensemble in 2017

Background information
- Origin: Montreal, Quebec City
- Genre: Canadian hip hop
- Years active: 2008-present
- Label: Disques 7ième Ciel (7ieme Ciel Records)
- Members: Ogden Ridjanovic; Akena Okoko; Claude Bégin; Eman; Vlooper
- Past members: Maybe Watson; Mash; Bueller Tout’nou; Thomas Gagnon-Coupal
- Website: alaclairensemble.com

Alaclair Ensemble is a Canadian hip hop musical collective based in the province of Quebec. Their musical style draws on traditional Québécois folk music as well as contemporary hip hop music and electronic music. They are known for PR stunts and tongue-in-cheek lyrics that border on the comedic.

The group consists of Ogden "Robert Nelson" Ridjanovic (rapper), Akena "KNLO" Okoko (rapper & producer), Claude Bégin (rapper, singer, producer, musician), Eman (rapper), and producer Louis-Nicolas Imbeau, known as Vlooper. The members also release music with their own side projects.

== Musical concept ==
The band's concept is based around an alternate history in which the Patriotes won the Lower Canada Rebellion of 1838 and established a state based on the Declaration of Independence of Lower Canada. In the band's Bas-Canada (Lower Canada) mythology, the nation suffers none of the linguistic tensions between Anglophones and Francophones that exist in contemporary Quebec and Canadian society, and the band performs lyrics in both languages.

== History ==
The collective was formed in Quebec City, after several of the members had participated in Bande à part's 93 tours project in 2007.

They released their debut album, 4,99, on Bandcamp in 2010. That was followed by Le Roé C'est Moé and Touladis in 2011, and, in 2012, Un Piou Piou Parmi Tant D'autres and America. In December 2012, they performed a "hip-hop Nocturne" at the Musée d'art contemporain de Montréal.

The group's 2013 album Les maigres blancs d'Amérique du Noir, whose title is a satirical pun on Pierre Vallières' Quebec revolutionary manifesto Les nègres blancs d'Amérique, was released on Google Records and was a long-listed nominee for the 2013 Polaris Music Prize.

Toute est impossible, was released in 2014. In 2016, they released the album Alaclair Acapellas, and were then signed to Disques 7ième Ciel (7ieme Ciel Records). They then released their first priced album, Les Frères Cueilleurs, and went on a tour of Quebec and parts of Europe. At ADISQ 2017, Alaclair Ensemble garnered nominations for the Critics' Choice Award, Show of the Year, Producer of the Year, Engineer of the Year, and Songwriter of the Year. Their video for the song "Ça que c'tait" won Video of the Year and Les Frères Cueilleurs won Hip Hop Album of the Year.

The album Le sens des paroles was released in 2018. At ADISQ 2019, Alaclair Ensemble received several nominations; the video for the song "La Famille" won Video of the Year, and the album won Rap Album of the Year. The album's lyrics are more serious than those of their earlier work. That was followed by America, Vol. 2 in 2019.

Also in 2019, the city of Laval, Quebec commissioned the group to create a song and video to encourage recycling. The result, Mets du respect dans ton bac (put some respect in your recycling bin), immediately went viral, with the video viewed 1.5 million times in its first five days.

In 2020, Alaclair Ensemble released the album Capitaine Canada. In 2021, Claude Bégin was a competitor in the Quebec edition of Big Brother Célébrités.

== Discography ==
- 4,99 (2010), Independent
- Le roé c'est moé (2011), Independent
- Touladis (2011)
- Un Piou Piou Parmi Tant D'autres (2012), Independent
- America (2012), Independent
- Les maigres blancs d'Amérique du Noir (2013), Independent
- Toute est impossible (2014), Independent
- Alaclair Acapellas (2016), Independent
- Les Frères Cueilleurs (2016)
- Le Sens des Paroles (2018), 7ième Ciel
- America, Vol. 2 (2019)
- Capitaine Canada (2020)
- LAIT PATERNEL (2023)
