= Florent Vollant =

Canadian singer-songwriter (born 1959)

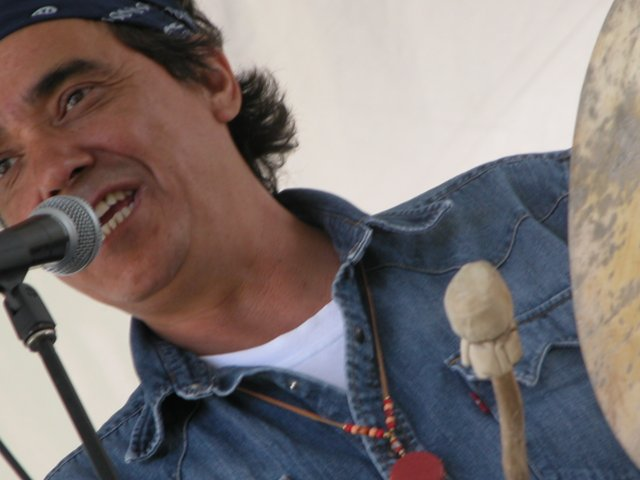
- Florent Vollant performing in 2006

Background information
- Born: August 10, 1959 (age 66); Labrador, Canada
- Genres: Folk
- Occupation: Singer-songwriter
- Formerly of: Kashtin
- Website: florentvollant.com

Florent Vollant (born August 10, 1959, in Labrador) is a Canadian singer-songwriter. An Innu from Maliotenam, Quebec, he was half of the popular folk music duo Kashtin, one of the most significant musical groups in First Nations history. He has subsequently released four solo albums.

In 1997, Vollant built his own recording studio – Makusham – on the reserve which is used by musicians inside and outside the community. His solo album Puamuna, which means 'dreams' in Innu, was the first time Vollant recorded a full album in his own studio. His Innu-language album of Christmas songs, Nipaiamianan, earned him an apostolic blessing from Pope John Paul II, as well as the Juno Award for Aboriginal Recording of the Year in 2001.

In 2020, he served as executive producer of Call Me Human (Je m'appelle humain), Kim O'Bomsawin's documentary film about Innu poet Joséphine Bacon. In 2023 he served as an executive producer on O'Bomsawin's documentary television series Telling Our Story.

He is also a mentor to Nikamu Mamuitun, a collective of emerging First Nations musicians including Marcie Michaud-Gagnon, Joëlle St-Pierre, Kanen, Chloé Lacasse, Scott-Pien Picard, Matiu, Cédrik St-Onge and Ivan Boivin.

He won the Félix Award for Indigenous Artist of the Year at the 41st Félix Awards in 2019.

== Discography ==
- Katak (2003)
- Nipaiamianan (2005)
- Eku Mamu (2009)
- Puamuna (2015)
- Mishta Meshkenu (2018)
