= L'heure mauve =

Studio album by Pierre Lapointe
- Released: February 7, 2022
- Genre: Bedroom pop; classical
- Length: 52:37
- Language: French
- Label: Pépiphonie; Bonsound
- Producer: Philippe Brault

Pierre Lapointe chronology
Chansons hivernales (2020)	L'heure mauve (2022)

L'heure mauve is the twelfth studio album by Canadian singer-songwriter Pierre Lapointe, released on February 7, 2022, through Pépiphonie and Bonsound. It was made to soundtrack Swiss artist Nicolas Party's exhibition L'heure mauve at the Montreal Museum of Fine Arts (MMFA), which was held from February 12 to October 16, 2022. Among the 14 tracks, Lapointe covered songs by Félix Leclerc and Kurt Weill. The album was released on vinyl in mid-2022.

== Background ==
Lapointe was approached by the Montreal Museum of Fine Arts to compose the album, with Lapointe stating that he admires Nicolas Party's art. He intended to explore themes of "the ephemerality of existence, loving mourning and carnal desire" and "create an enveloping and dreamlike universe, which echoes the themes and the structure" of the exhibition. Each of the tracks soundtracks a different room of Party's exhibit, with visitors encouraged to plug in their headphones in each room.

The cover art is Party's Portrait avec serpents (2019).

== Track listing ==
L'heure mauve track listing
No.	Title	Writer(s)	Length
1.	"Le serpent qui danse"	Léo Ferré; Charles Baudelaire	3:00
2.	"La danse du conquistador"	Lapointe	2:27
3.	"L'hymne au printemps"	Félix Leclerc	2:31
4.	"L'hymne à l'automne"	Lapointe	2:55
5.	"Sag mir wo die Blumen sind"	Pete Seeger; Joe Hickerson; Max Colpet	3:56
6.	"Les fleurs d'une autre dimension"	Lapointe	3:23
7.	"L'hiver"	Claude Leveillee; Gilles Vigneault	2:44
8.	"Aujourd'hui la neige revient"	Lapointe	3:35
9.	"Non je n'ai rien oublié"	Georges Garvarentz - Charles Aznavour	6:26
10.	"Le même café, la même rue"	Lapointe	5:10
11.	"Gnossienne No. 1"	Erik Satie	4:25
12.	"L'heure mauve 22"	Philippe Brault - Lapointe	2:18
13.	"Youkali"	Kurt Weill; Roger Bertrand	5:20
14.	"Pépiphonie"	Lapointe	4:27
Total length:			52:37
