= List of number-one albums of 2017 (Canada) =

These are the Canadian number-one albums of 2017. The chart is compiled by Nielsen SoundScan and published in Billboard magazine as Top Canadian Albums.

Note that Billboard publishes charts with an issue date approximately 10–11 days in advance.

== Number-one albums ==
Key
†	Indicates best-performing album of 2017

Issue date	Album	Artist(s)	Ref.
January 7	A Pentatonix Christmas	Pentatonix	
January 14	Starboy	The Weeknd	
January 21	Starboy	The Weeknd	
January 28	Starboy	The Weeknd	
February 4	Starboy	The Weeknd	
February 11	Starboy	The Weeknd	
February 18	Culture	Migos	
February 25	I Decided	Big Sean	
March 4	Fifty Shades Darker	Soundtrack	
March 11	Future	Future	
March 18	Hndrxx	Future	
March 25	÷ †	Ed Sheeran	
April 1	÷ †	Ed Sheeran	
April 8	More Life	Drake	
April 15	More Life	Drake	
April 22	More Life	Drake	
April 29	Memories...Do Not Open	The Chainsmokers	
May 6	Damn	Kendrick Lamar	
May 13	Damn	Kendrick Lamar	
May 20	Damn	Kendrick Lamar	
May 27	From A Room: Volume 1	Chris Stapleton	
June 3	Harry Styles	Harry Styles	
June 10	One More Light	Linkin Park	
June 17	Summer Latin Hits 2017	Various artists	
June 24	Hopeless Fountain Kingdom	Halsey	
July 1	Witness	Katy Perry	
July 8	Melodrama	Lorde	
July 15	Evolve	Imagine Dragons	
July 22	Funk Wav Bounces Vol. 1	Calvin Harris	
July 29	4:44	Jay-Z	
August 5	÷ †	Ed Sheeran	
August 12	Lust for Life	Lana Del Rey	
August 19	Everything Now	Arcade Fire	
August 26	÷ †	Ed Sheeran	
September 2	Rainbow	Kesha	
September 9	÷ †	Ed Sheeran	
September 16	Villains	Queens of the Stone Age	
September 23	American Dream	LCD Soundsystem	
September 30	Sleep Well Beast	The National	
October 7	Concrete and Gold	Foo Fighters	
October 14	Gemini	Macklemore	
October 21	Now	Shania Twain	
October 28	La Science du cœur	Pierre Lapointe	
November 4	Beautiful Trauma	Pink	
November 11	Flicker	Niall Horan	
November 18	Introduce Yerself	Gord Downie	
November 25	The Thrill of It All	Sam Smith	
December 2	Reputation	Taylor Swift	
December 9	Reputation	Taylor Swift	
December 16	Reputation	Taylor Swift	
December 23	Songs of Experience	U2	
December 30	÷ †	Ed Sheeran	

== See also ==
- List of Canadian Hot 100 number-one singles of 2017
