= Paul Piché =

Canadian singer-songwriter

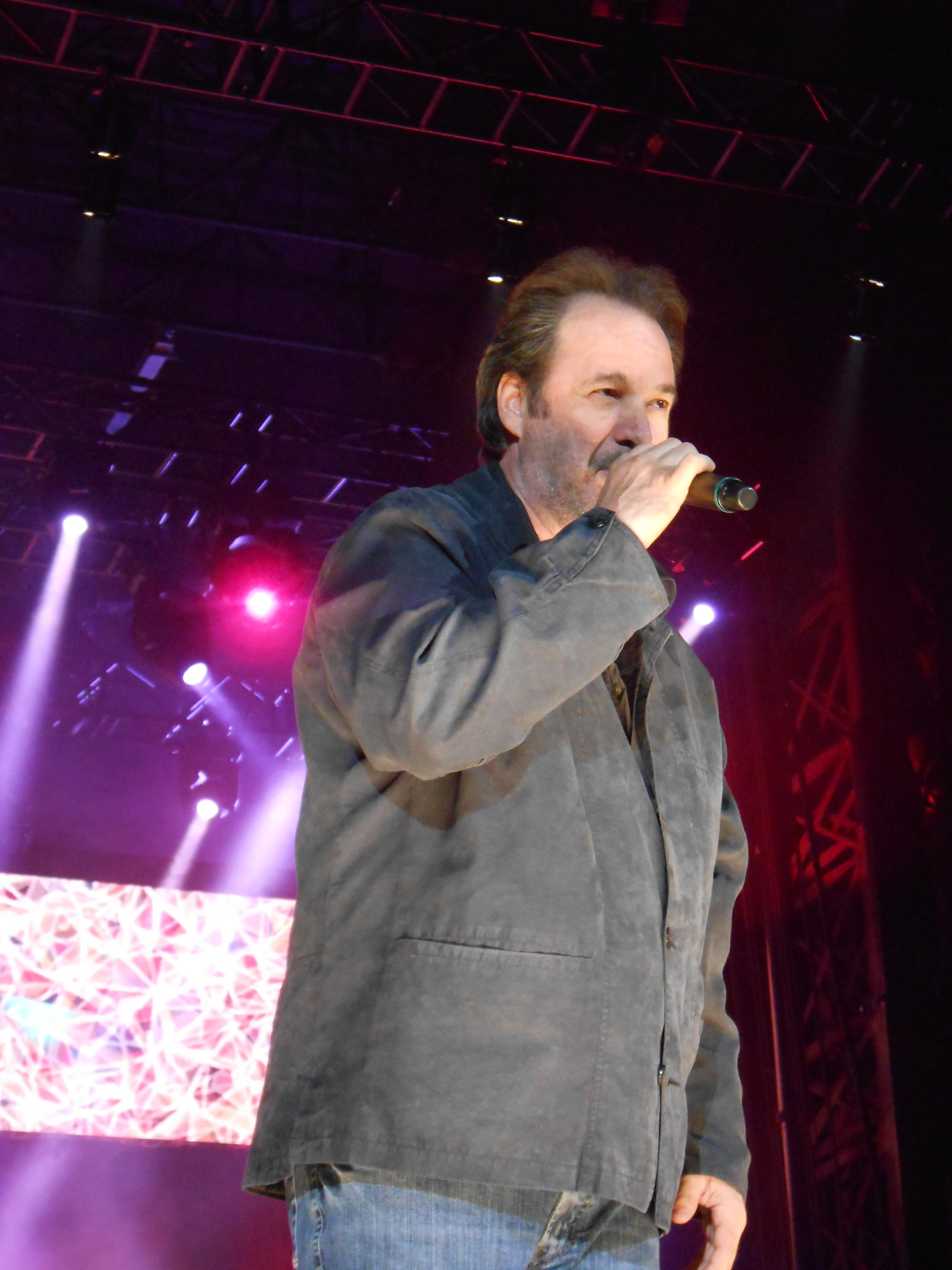
- Piché at Les FrancoFolies de Montréal on June 17, 2013

Background information
- Born: September 5, 1953 (age 72); La Minerve, Quebec, Canada
- Origin: La Minerve
- Genres: Folk rock, folk, rock, blues, country
- Occupations: Singer-songwriter, author, poet
- Instruments: Vocals, guitar, keyboards/piano
- Years active: 1977–present
- Label: Kébek Disk

Paul Piché (born September 5, 1953) is a Canadian singer-songwriter, environmentalist and political activist

He mostly composes on acoustic guitar, although some of his recent work has had some electronica sound input. Many of his songs have become classics of the Québécois repertoire at cabaret nights, parties, camp fires, and especially at Saint-Jean-Baptiste Day celebrations.

== Biography ==
Piché studied archaeology at the Université de Montréal, and in the early 1970s sang in Quebec colleges. In 1977 the keyboardist Robert Léger of Beau Dommage encouraged him to record his first LP, À qui appartient le beau temps, which sold more than 100,000 copies.

In 1980, Piché releases his second album, L’escalier, which was inspired by his trip down the staircase in René Lévesque Boulevard.

From then on, Piché began working with the keyboardist Michel Hinton (also from Beau Dommage). His single "Tous les vents", reached second place on the Radio-activité chart in August 1984 and his album Nouvelles d'Europe won the Félix Award for best rock album of 1985. In 1986 he performed with Michel Rivard and released a double album, Intégral, which is a collection of all his works. He then travelled throughout Quebec and performed at the festivals of Millénaire in Brussels, in La Rochelle, and in Nyon, Switzerland.

Sur le chemin des incendies, which sold more than 100,000 copies, revealed a more personal facet of the songwriter. Many pieces were written in collaboration with the guitarist Rick Haworth. "J'appelle", reached first place on the Radio activité chart in December 1988.

Piché participated in the St-Jean Baptiste nationalist gatherings in 1990 on the Plains of Abraham of Quebec City, and on St. Helen's Island in Montreal. Often associated with the great names of the Quebec chanson, Piché participated in La Fête à Vigneault at the Francofolies of Montreal in 1990, which celebrated the 30-year-career of the national poet. Montreal's La Presse proclaimed Piché 'Personality of the Year' in the song category.

Journalist Laurent Saulnier stated that Piché was the missing link between Bruce Springsteen and Jacques Brel, "an original mixture of French song, American rock, and Quebec folklore". (Voir, February 23, 1989).

In 2016, during the Saint-Jean-Baptiste Day, he performed after Triple Rock, a group that is made out of Théo, Yoopa and Benoît Archambault. From June 17 to 19, 2018, Paul had performed at the City Center in Saint-Constant, Quebec after Alexis Arbour.

== Discography ==
=== Studio albums ===
- 1977 – À qui appartient l'beau temps?
- 1980 – L'escalier
- 1982 – Paul Piché (Les Pleins)
- 1984 – Nouvelles d'Europe
- 1988 – Sur le chemin des incendies
- 1993 – L'instant
- 1999 – Le voyage
- 2009 – Sur ce côté de la Terre

=== Compilations ===
- 1986 – Intégral
- 1996 – L'un et l'autre

== See also ==
- List of Quebec musicians
- Music of Quebec
