= Punkt =

Studio album by Pierre Lapointe
- Released: 26 February 2013
- Genre: Pop
- Label: Audiogram
- Producer: Philippe Brault

Pierre Lapointe chronology
Seul au piano (2011)	Punkt (2013)	Paris Tristesse (2014)

Punkt is a studio album by Canadian Québécois Pierre Lapointe, released by Audiogram on 26 February 2013. The album was long listed for the 2013 Polaris Music Prize.

== Track listing ==
1. La sexualité – 03:31
2. L’étrange route des amoureux – 02:00
3. Monsieur – 03:19
4. Plus vite que ton corps – 02:33
5. Des maux sur tout – 01:18
6. Tu es seul et resteras seul – 01:30
7. Nos joies répétitives – 04:08
8. Les remords ont faim – 03:40
9. Les délicieux amants – 01:24
10. Nu devant moi – 03:31
11. La date, l’heure, le moment – 03:39
12. N2o – 01:26
13. Gaetano Pesce – 01:40
14. Les ministères – 03:05
15. Barbara – 02:41
16. Les enfants du diable – 03:02

== Reception ==
The Gazette's (Montreal) Bernard Perusse awarded the album 3.5 out of 5 stars.
