= Sentiments humains =

Sentiments Humains

Studio album by Pierre Lapointe
- Released: April 14, 2009
- Genre: Pop rock, world
- Length: 39:27
- Label: Audiogram, Audoram, Select
- Producer: Philippe Brault

Pierre Lapointe chronology
Pierre Lapointe en concert dans la forêt des mal-aimés avec l'Orchestre Métropolitain du Grand Montréal dirigé par Yannick Nézet-Séguin (2007)	Sentiments Humains (2009)	Seul au Piano (2011)

Sentiments Humains is an album by the Canadian singer Pierre Lapointe, released in April 2009. The album reached a peak position of number two on Billboard's Top Canadian Albums chart.

== Reception ==
Sentiments Humains reached a peak position of number two on Billboard's Top Canadian Albums chart.

== Track listing ==
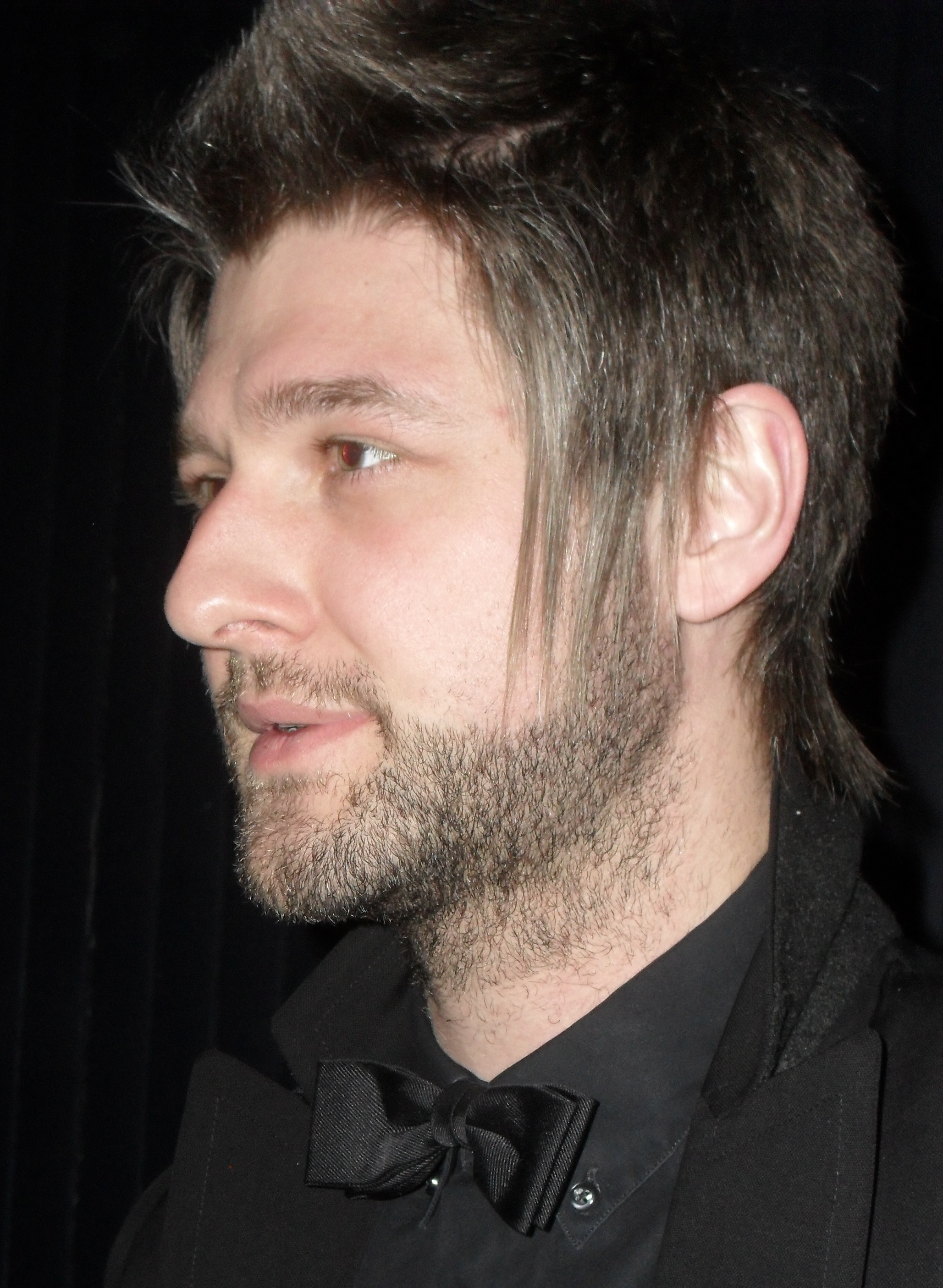
Lapointe in 2011

All tracks written by Lapointe, unless noted otherwise.

1. "Ces étranges lueurs" – 1:19
2. "Le magnétisme des amants" – 3:06
3. "Je reviendrai" – 3:51
4. "Au Bar des suicidés" (Philippe Bergeron, Lapointe) – 3:23
5. "Tu es à moi" (Bergeron, Lapointe) – 2:49
6. "Les lignes de ma main" – 2:41
7. "Les sentiments humains" – 4:08
8. "Nous restions là" – 3:57
9. "Coulent les rires" – 2:51
10. "L'enfant de ma mère" – 4:09
11. "Comme si c'était hier" – 3:20
12. "Les éphérites" – 3:53

Track listing adapted from AllMusic.

== Personnel ==
- Philippe Bergeron – composer
- Sandrine Bisson – choir
- Jacques Boisclari – trombone
- Philippe Brault – clavier
- Amélie Chérubain-Soulière – choir
- Valérie Deault – choir
- Guido Del Fabbro – clavier, soloist
- Josianne Hébert – piano
- Chloé Lacasse – choir
- Pierre Lapointe – composer, vocals
- John Londono – photography
- Jean-Moïse Martin – choir
- Alex McMahon – clavier, Fender Rhodes
- Ryan Morey – mastering
- Jonathan Morier – choir
- François Pagé – assistant
- Bruno Paradis – choir
- Christian Perrault – choir
- Philippe Robert – choir
- Jacques Kuba Seguin – flugelhorn
- Philippe Thibaudeau – choir

Credits adapted from AllMusic.

== Charts ==
Chart (2009)	Peak position
Canadian Albums (Billboard)	2
French Albums (SNEP)	72

== Release history ==
Date	Label	Format
2009	Select	CD
2009	Audiogram / Audogram / Select	Enhanced CD
2010		CD

Release history adapted from AllMusic.
