= Où est passée la noce? =

Studio album by Beau Dommage
- Released: 1975
- Recorded: 1974
- Genre: Folk rock, pop rock, progressive rock
- Length: 44:49
- Label: Capitol ST-70.037

Beau Dommage chronology
Beau Dommage (1974)	Où est passée la noce? (1975)	Un autre jour arrive en ville (1976)

Où est passée la noce is the second studio release by Quebec folk-rock group Beau Dommage.

Because of the long song "Un incident à Bois-des-Filion" on side two of the album, Beau Dommage has traditionally been classified as a progressive rock group since the 1970s by fans of that genre. The booklet accompanying the Beau Dommage box set acknowledges the influence of Jethro Tull and Supertramp on this album.

== Track listing ==
All tracks written by Robert Léger except where noted.

=== Side one ===
1. "Le blues d'la métropole" (written by Pierre Huet) – 4:13
2. "Assis dans' cuisine" (written by Pierre Bertrand) – 2:03
3. "Amène pas ta gang" – 3:13
4. "Motel « Mon repos » (written by Michel Rivard) " – 3:35
5. "J'ai oublié le jour" – 3:05
6. "Bon débarras" – 2:55
7. "Heureusement qu'il y a la nuit" – 5:45

=== Side two ===
1. "Un incident à Bois-des-Filion" (written by Pierre Huet / Michel Rivard / Pierre Bertrand / Robert Léger) – 20:30
