= Beau Dommage (album) =

Studio album by Beau Dommage
- Released: 1974
- Recorded: 1974
- Genre: Folk rock
- Length: 38:59
- Label: Capitol ST-70.034
- Producer: Michel Lachance

Beau Dommage chronology
Beau Dommage (1974)	Où est passée la noce? (1975)

Beau Dommage is the self-titled debut album by Quebec folk-rock group Beau Dommage, released in 1974. It is their most popular album, making triple platinum with many hit singles such as Le picbois, Tous les palmiers, and La complainte du phoque en Alaska.

== Track listing ==
All tracks written by Robert Léger except where noted.

=== Side One ===
1. "Tous les palmiers" – 3:20
2. "À toutes les fois" – 4:14
3. "Chinatown" (written by Michel Rivard) – 3:05
4. "La complainte du phoque en Alaska" (written by Michel Rivard) – 5:15
5. "Le picbois" (written by Robert Léger, Michel Rivard, and Pierre Bertrand) – 3:25

=== Side Two ===
1. "Harmonie du soir à Châteauguay" – 3:06
2. "Le Géant Beaupré" (written by Pierre Huet) – 4:02
3. "Ginette" (written by Pierre Huet and Michel Rivard) – 2:35
4. "Un ange gardien" (written by Pierre Huet and Michel Rivard) – 2:56
5. "23 décembre" (written by Pierre Huet and Michel Rivard) – 2:14
6. "Montréal" (written by Pierre Huet and Robert Léger) – 4:44

== Personnel ==
=== Band ===
- Pierre Bertrand – vocals, acoustic guitar, keyboards,
- Marie-Michèle Desrosiers – vocals, synthesiser
- Réal Desrosiers – drums
- Robert Léger – piano, synthesiser, flute, bass
- Michel Rivard – vocals, acoustic guitar, electric guitar

=== Production ===
- Michel Lachance – producer / mixer
- Pierre Dubord – art director
- Pierre Guimond – makeup and photography
