= The Procession (film) =

2019 Canadian short film

- French: Le Cortège
- Directed by: Pascal Blanchet; Rodolphe Saint-Gelais
- Written by: Pascal Blanchet; Sylvain Charbonneau
- Produced by: Julie Roy
- Music by: Philippe Brault; Pierre Lapointe
- Production company: National Film Board of Canada
- Release date: June 4, 2019 (Zagreb)
- Running time: 11 minutes
- Country: Canada

The Procession (French: Le Cortège) is a Canadian animated short film, directed by Pascal Blanchet and Rodolphe Saint-Gelais and released in 2019. The film centres on Catherine, a woman who has recently died in a car accident, and is narrating a love letter to her husband Philippe as he prepares for her funeral.

The film received a Prix Iris nomination for Best Animated Short Film at the 22nd Quebec Cinema Awards. In 2020, it was selected for inclusion in the online We Are One: A Global Film Festival.
