= Salomé Leclerc =

Canadian singer-songwriter from Quebec (born 1986)

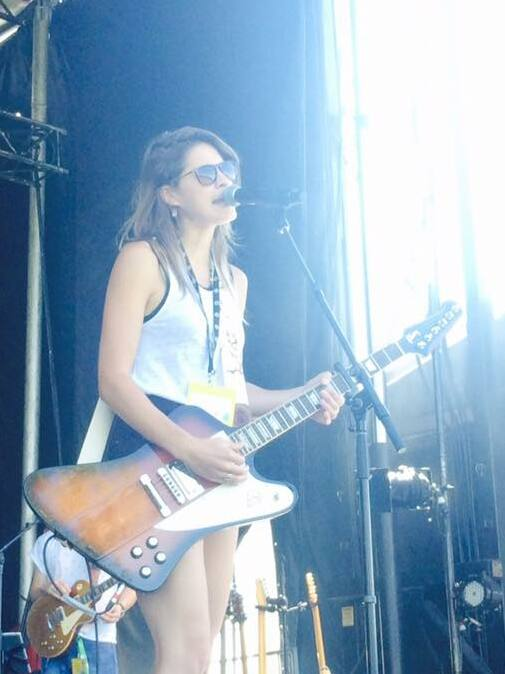

Background information
- Born: Salomé Roux-Leclerc; April 27, 1986 (age 40); Sainte-Françoise-de-Lotbinière, Quebec, Canada
- Genres: Pop, folk-rock
- Occupations: songwriter, performer, recording artist
- Instruments: Vocals, Guitar
- Years active: 2010-present
- Label: Audiogram

Salomé Leclerc (born April 27, 1986) is a Canadian singer-songwriter from Quebec.

== Biography ==
Leclerc studied music at the École de la chanson de Granby, before releasing her debut album Sous les arbres in 2011. She received a SOCAN Songwriting Prize nomination in 2012 for the song "Dans la prairie".

She followed up in 2014 with 27 fois l'aurore. She performed at the Francofolies de Spa in May 2015, where she won the Prix Rapsat-Lelièvre, and at the Francofolies de Montréal in June 2015, where she won the Prix Félix-Leclerc. In the same year, she received a second SOCAN Songwriting Prize nomination in 2015 for the song "Arlon".

In 2016 she released the EP Live au Treatment, comprising four songs recorded at Philippe Brault's Treatment Room studio.

Her third album, Les choses extérieures, was released in 2018, and was a longlisted nominee for the 2019 Polaris Music Prize.

She has also performed in the group Louve, with Marie-Pierre Arthur, Ariane Moffatt, Amylie and Laurence Lafond-Beaulne.

== Discography ==
- Sous les arbres (2011)
- 27 fois l'aurore (2014)
- Live au Treatment (2016)
- Les choses extérieures (2018)
- Mille ouvrages mon cœur (2021)
