= Lugano Arte e Cultura =

Cultural centre in Lugano, Switzerland

Coordinates: 45.9994°N 8.9482°E

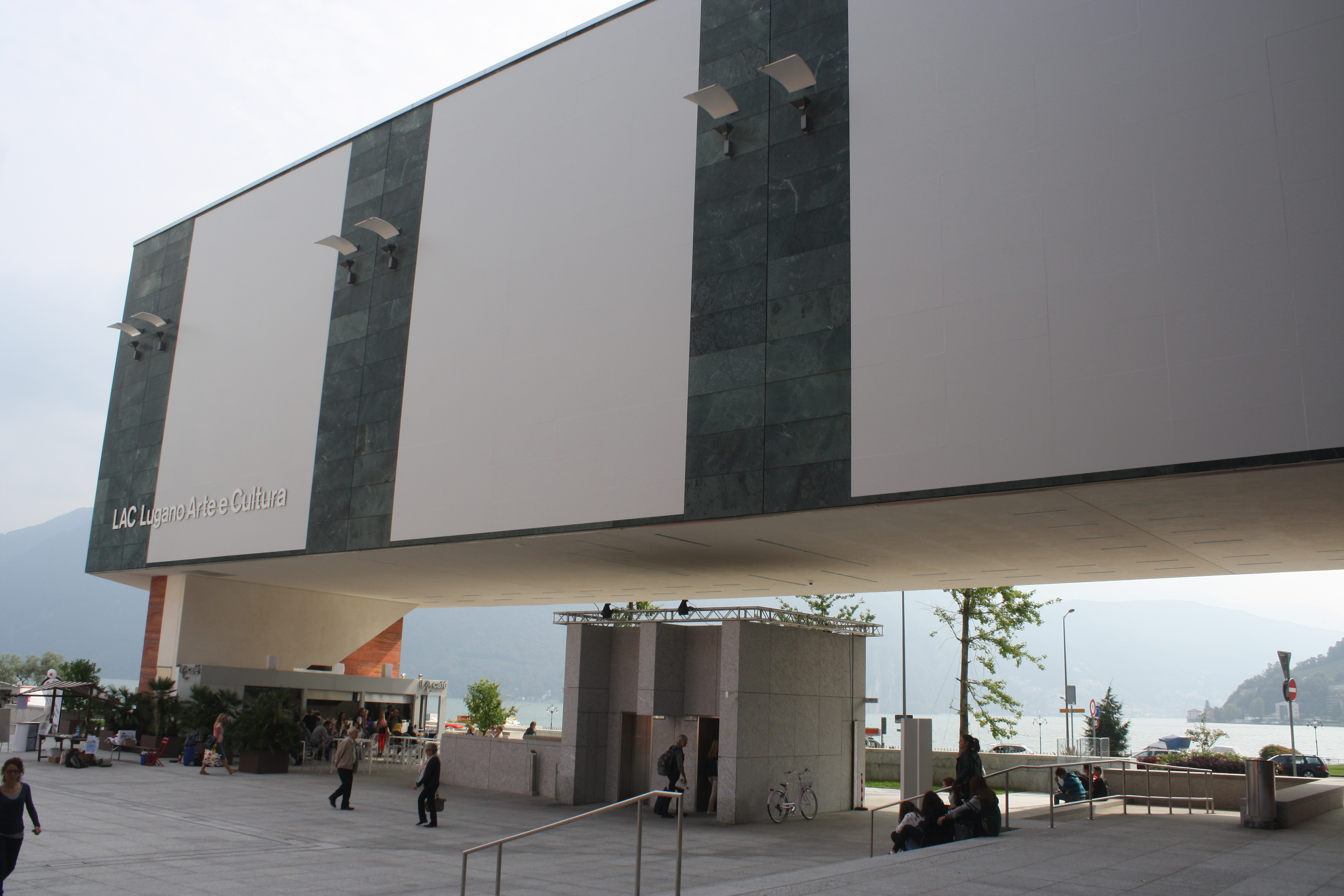
An image of Lugano Arte e Cultura

Lugano Arte e Cultura (LAC) is a polyfunctional cultural centre dedicated to music, visual and performance arts in Lugano, Switzerland. It houses the Museo d'arte della Svizzera italiana (MASI Lugano) and hosts events such as "LuganoInScena" and "LuganoMusica". The Orchestra della Svizzera Italiana has its base at the LAC.

== History ==
Lugano Arte e Cultura was inaugurated on 12 September 2015. The director is Michel Gagnon. Gagnon was previously the artistic director of the Place des Arts in Montreal.

== Architecture ==
The LAC centre was built by architect Ivano Gianola, an exponent of the Ticino School of architecture. The building has a total volume of 180,000 m^{3} and welcomes visitors in a 650 m^{3} entrance hall with large windows, aimed at rendering the boundary between indoor and outdoor. The cultural centre defines the Piazza Bernardino Luini, overlooking the lake of Lugano. The theatre and concert auditorium with 800 m^{2} allows seating for 1000 people. The museum is spread over three exhibition floors with a total surface area of 2500 m^{2}.

== Art exhibitions ==
The LAC houses the Museo d'arte della Svizzera italiana (MASI Lugano). One floor houses displays from the museum's collection whilst the other two floors host temporary exhibitions. Since its opening, the MASI has organized exhibitions of Anthony McCall, Albert Oehlen, Nicolas Party and James Barnor. As from 2018 the director of the MASI is Tobia Bezzola.
