= Chansons hivernales =

Studio album by Pierre Lapointe
- Released: November 20, 2020
- Genre: Christmas
- Length: 36:25
- Language: French
- Label: Audiogram
- Producer: Emmanuel Éthier

Pierre Lapointe chronology
Pour déjouer l'ennui (2019)	Chansons hivernales (2020)	L'heure mauve (2022)

Professional ratings
Review scores
Source	Rating
La Presse	3.5/5 stars

Chansons hivernales (transl. Winter Songs) is the eleventh studio and first Christmas album by Canadian singer Pierre Lapointe, released through Audiogram on November 20, 2020. It was produced by Emmanuel Éthier. The album debuted at number 10 on the Canadian Albums Chart in the issue dated December 5, 2020.

== Background ==
Lapointe told Apple Music that he had "been wanting to do a Christmas album for 15 years" but that "people raised their eyebrows when I told them about the project". He further explained that the songs explore the "bittersweet lightness of the holiday season".

== Critical reception ==
Reviewing the album for La Presse, Josée Lapointe called the album a "nice gift" from Pierre Lapointe, describing it as "full of joyful winks and with just enough sadness and nostalgia, which should pleasantly furnish our cold winter evenings".

== Track listing ==
Chansons hivernales track listing
No.	Title	Length
1.	"Chaque année on y revient"	3:03
2.	"C'est qu'on sait déjà"	2:19
3.	"Le premier Noël de Jules"	4:15
4.	"Chez Clara"	3:12
5.	"Ça va, j'ai donné"	3:46
6.	"L'oiseau rare"	4:19
7.	"Six heures d'avion nous séparent" (with Mika)	2:48
8.	"Toutes les couleurs"	2:37
9.	"Noël Lougawou" (with Mélissa Laveaux)	3:28
10.	"Un Noël perdu dans Paris"	2:57
11.	"Maman, Papa"	3:41
Total length:		36:25

== Charts ==
Chart performance for Chansons hivernales
Chart (2020)	Peak position
Canadian Albums (Billboard)	10
