= Punct =

Punct may refer to:

- Punct (magazine), Romanian art magazine
- PÜNCT, two-player strategy board game
- Abbreviation for punctuation

== See also ==
- Punk'd, American hidden camera–practical joke reality television series
- Punkt, 2013 album by Canadian Québécois Pierre Lapointe
