= La Forêt des mal-aimés =

La Forêt des Mal-Aimés

Studio album by Pierre Lapointe
- Released: 26 March 2006
- Recorded: 2005–2006
- Genre: Pop; avant-pop
- Length: 48:08
- Label: Audiogram
- Producer: Jean Massicotte, Philippe Brault

Pierre Lapointe chronology
Pierre Lapointe (2004)	La Forêt des Mal-Aimés (2006)	2 X2 & 25-1-14-14 (2007)

La Forêt des Mal-Aimés (The Forest of Outcasts) is a 2006 studio album by Quebec, Canadian singer Pierre Lapointe being his second actual studio album after his Pierre Lapointe promotional limited edition album in 2002, but officially considered his debut official release on Audiogram records. By mid-June 2006, it had sold over 80,000 copies.

== Track listing ==
1. "Dans la forêt des mal-aimés" – 3:56
2. "Deux par deux rassemblés" – 3:53
3. "Le lion imberbe" – 2:50
4. "25-1-14-14" – 2:22
5. "Qu'en est-il de la chance" – 2:17
6. "L'endomètre rebelle" – 5:25
7. "Tous les visages" – 2:26
8. "Moi, je t'aimerai" – 3:06
9. "Nous n'irons pas" – 2:00
10. "Au 27-100 Rue des partances" – 3:03
11. "Au nom des cieux galvanisés" – 3:42
12. "25-1-14-14.16" – 0:58
13. "L'équipage" – 3:14
14. "De glace" – 3:16
15. "Au pays des fleurs de la transe" – 5:40

== Charts ==
The album reached number one on the Canadian charts and was Lapointe's first charting album in France, peaking at number 112 on the SNEP official albums chart.

Chart performance for La Forêt des mal-aimés
Chart (2006)	Peak position
Canadian Albums Chart	1
French Albums (SNEP)	112

== 2 X2 ==
2 X2

Remix album by Pierre Lapointe and various artists
- Released: 27 March 2007
- Length: 24:24
- Label: Audiogram

Pierre Lapointe and various artists chronology
La Forêt des Mal-Aimés (2006)	2 X2 (2007)	Pierre Lapointe en concert dans la forêt des mal-aimés avec l'Orchestre Métropolitain du Grand Montréal dirigé par Yannick Nézet-Séguin (2007)

The album La Forêt des Mal-Aimés was the subject of a remix album released in March 2007, a year after the release of the album. Titled 2 X2 (read as "deux par deux" in French, meaning "2 by 2"), it was a 24-minute limited edition / short album by Les Disques Audiogramme that included remixes of tracks all from La forêt des mal-aimés plus one unpublished track titled "Le Maquis", written by Philippe B., the guitar player in Lapointe's backing band.

Philippe Brault, not to be confused with Philippe B., was co-arranger of the album with Jean Massicotte. The two had won a Félix Award in 2006 for their arrangement and musical direction of the La Forêt des Mal-Aimés show.

=== Naming ===
The name is a reference to Pierre Lapointe's major hit "Deux par deux rassemblés", the best-known single from the original album.

=== Influences ===
The remixes are from a variety of different participants, including Jean-Philippe Goncalves remixing the title track from La Forêt des Mal-Aimés, Kid Koala providing an instrumental of "25-1-14-14", the rhythms of Ghislain Poirier and Jérôme Minière in two separate mixes of "Deux par deux rassemblés", while Jean Massicotte made the remix of "Au nom des cieux galvanisés".

=== Booklet ===
The cover of the release was innovative and flexible. The upper part of the cover was a flexible head shot of Lapointe, with the purchaser of the album offered four more alternative cuttings of a morchella, a snail, a carnivore animal and a flower, which they could slot in to replace the head of the artist according to their choice.

=== Track listing ===
Track #	Title	Mixed by	Length
1.	"Dans la forêt des mal-aimés"	Jean-Philippe Goncalves	4:10
2.	"Deux par deux rassemblés"	Jérôme Minière	4:04
3.	"Le maquis" (new track)	Jean Massicotte and Philippe Brault	3:05
4.	"Au nom des cieux galvanisés"	Jean Massicotte and Philippe Brault	3:06
5.	"25-1-14-14" (instrumental)	Kid Koala	2:33
6.	"Tous les visages"	Jean Massicotte	3:04
7.	"Deux par deux rassemblés"	Ghislain Poirier	4:22

== 25-1-14-14 ==
25-1-14-14

Remix album by Pierre Lapointe and various artists
- Released: March 2007
- Length: 21:19
- Label: Audiogram

Pierre Lapointe and various artists chronology
La Forêt des Mal-Aimés (2006)	25-1-14-14 (2007)	Pierre Lapointe en concert dans la forêt des mal-aimés avec l'Orchestre Métropolitain du Grand Montréal dirigé par Yannick Nézet-Séguin (2007)

The album 25-1-14-14 is another offshoot of the La Forêt des Mal-Aimés, being a limited release of just 1000 copies on vinyl that has the same content of 2 X2 but without the additional "Le maquis" track included on that album. The release was intended for true enthusiasts as a collector's item or for DJs interested in using Lapointe's work.

=== Track listing ===
The order of the track list is notably different from the 2 X2 album as follows:

Track #	Title	Mixed by	Length
1.	"Deux par deux rassemblés"	Ghislain Poirier	4:22
2.	"Tous les visages"	Jean Massicotte	3:04
3.	"Au nom des cieux galvanisés"	Jean Massicotte and Philippe Brault	3:06
4.	"Dans la forêt des mal-aimés"	Jean-Philippe Goncalves	4:10
5.	"Deux par deux rassemblés"	Jérôme Minière	4:04
6.	"25-1-14-14" (instrumental)	Kid Koala	2:33

== Live album ==
Pierre Lapointe en concert dans la forêt des mal-aimés avec l'Orchestre Métropolitain du Grand Montréal dirigé par Yannick Nézet-Séguin (En concert dans la forêt des mal-aimés)

Live album by Pierre Lapointe and Orchestre Métropolitain du Grand Montréal directed by Yannick Nézet-Séguin
- Released: 27 November 2007
- Recorded: 5 August 2014
- Genre: Pop
- Length: 64:35
- Label: Audiogram

Pierre Lapointe and Orchestre Métropolitain du Grand Montréal directed by Yannick Nézet-Séguin chronology
25-1-14-14 & 2 X2 (2007)	Pierre Lapointe en concert dans la forêt des mal-aimés avec l'Orchestre Métropolitain du Grand Montréal dirigé par Yannick Nézet-Séguin (En concert dans la forêt des mal-aimés) (2007)	Sentiments Humains (2009)

A live album called Pierre Lapointe en concert dans la forêt des mal-aimés avec l'Orchestre Métropolitain du Grand Montréal dirigé par Yannick Nézet-Séguin (in short known as En concert dans la forêt des mal-aimés) was released the following year in 2007. It was a live recording of a concert held on 5 August 2014 by Pierre Lapointe during the closing of the annual festival Les FrancoFolies de Montréal celebrating French language music. During the concert he was accompanied by the Orchestre Métropolitain du Grand Montréal and conductor Yannick Nézet-Séguin.

The concert was broadcast in full on Radio-Canada on 12 August 2007 and was edited by Audiogram.

=== Charts ===
This live 2007 release also made it to the Quebec Canadian charts, peaking at number 22.

Chart performance for Pierre Lapointe en concert...
Chart (2007)	Peak position
Canadian (Quebec) Albums Chart	22

=== Track listing ===
1. "Ouverture" – 1:35
2. "Tic Tac" – 2:35
3. "Transition" – 0:40
4. "Dans la forêt des mal-aimés" – 3:47
5. "Debout sur ma tête" – 3:53
6. "25-1-14-14" – 2:04
7. "Etoile étiolée" – 1:18
8. "Plaisirs dénudés" – 2:58
9. "Reine Emilie" – 2:36
10. "Qu'en est-il de la chance?" – 2:30
11. "Vous" – 4:06
12. "Tel un seul homme" – 3:50
13. "L'endomètre rebelle" – 5:45
14. "Au nom des cieux galvanisés" – 3:21
15. "De glace" – 3:21
16. "Le lion imberbe" – 3:11
17. "Tous les visages" – 2:48
18. "Intro Colombarium" – 0:54
19. "Le columbarium" – 3:48
20. "Au pays des fleurs de la transe" – 5:42
21. "Deux par deux rassemblés" – 4:25
