= Seul au piano =

Seul au Piano

Studio album by Pierre Lapointe
- Released: January 17, 2011
- Recorded: November 2010
- Genre: Pop rock, world
- Length: 69:32
- Label: Wagram

Pierre Lapointe chronology
Sentiments Humains (2009)	Seul au Piano (2011)	Punkt (2013)

Seul au Piano, also referred to as Pierre Lapointe Seul au Piano (English: Pierre Lapointe Alone at the Piano), is an album by Canadian Québécois singer Pierre Lapointe, recorded in November 2010 and released in January 2011. The album reached a peak position of number two on Billboard's Top Canadian Albums chart.

== Composition ==
Seul au Piano contains sixteen tracks, all written or co-written by Lapointe. "Reine Émilie" originally appeared on Lapointe's self-titled album (2004). "Le Lion Imberbe", "27-100 Rue des Partances" (as "Au 27-100 Rue de Partances"), "Deux par Deux Rassemblés", "De Glace" and "Tous les Visages" originally appeared on Lapointe's 2006 album La Forêt des Mal-Aimés. "Ces Étranges Lueurs" and "Le Magnétisme des Amants", performed as a single track on Seul au Piano, and "Au Bar Des Suicidés", co-written by Philippe Bergeron, originally appeared on Lapointe's 2009 album Sentiments Humains.

== Reception ==
Professional ratings
Review scores
Source	Rating
AllMusic	3.5/5 stars

Adam Greenberg of AllMusic rated the album 3.5 out of 5 stars.

Seul au Piano reached a peak position of number two on Billboard's Top Canadian Albums chart.

== Track listing ==
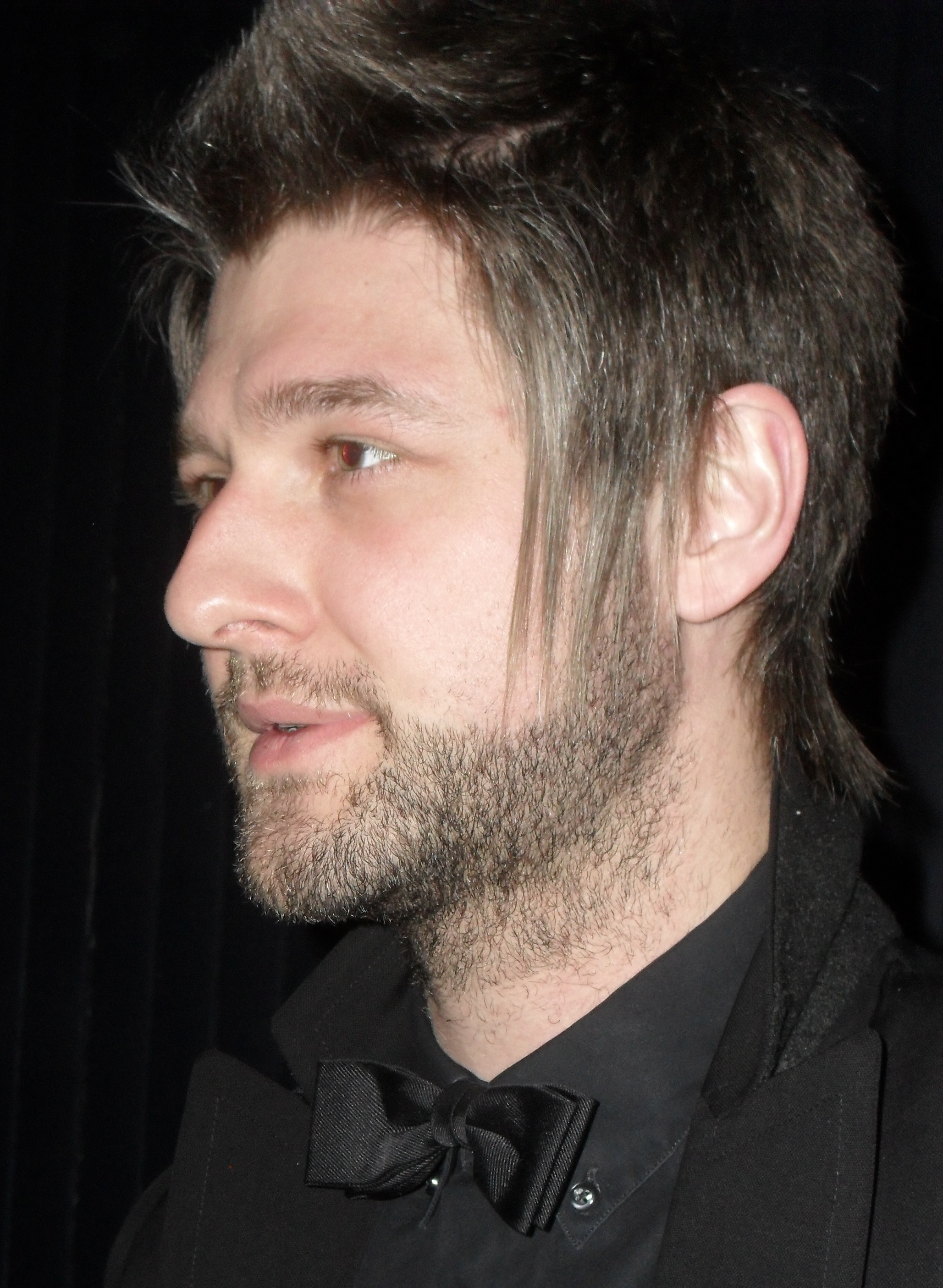
Lapointe in 2011

All tracks written by Lapointe, unless noted otherwise.

1. "Le Lion Imberbe" – 3:12
2. "Ces Étranges Lueurs/Le Magnétisme des Amants" – 3:56
3. "Les Vertiges d'en Haut" – 2:52
4. "27-100 Rue des Partances" – 3:12
5. "Moi, Elsie" (Richard Desjardins, Lapointe) – 5:20
6. "Maman" – 3:20
7. "Nous Restions Là" – 4:12
8. "Deux par Deux Rassemblés" – 3:56
9. "De Glace" – 3:36
10. "L' Amour Solaire" – 4:05
11. "Tous les Visages" – 2:38
12. "Les Lignes de la Main" – 2:41
13. "Les Sentiments Humains" – 4:55
14. "Rappel" – 2:54
15. "Reine Émilie" – 3:42
16. "Au Bar des Suicidés" (Philippe Bergeron, Lapointe) – 15:01

Track listing adapted from AllMusic.

== Personnel ==
- Philippe Bergeron – composer
- Richard Desjardins – composer
- Pierre Lapointe – composer, primary artist
- John Londono – photography
- Simon Rivest – design

Credits adapted from AllMusic.

== Release history ==
Date	Label	Format
2010	Wagram	CD
2011	Audiogram / Select Canada	CD

Release history adapted from AllMusic.
