= Amylie =

Canadian singer-songwriter from Quebec

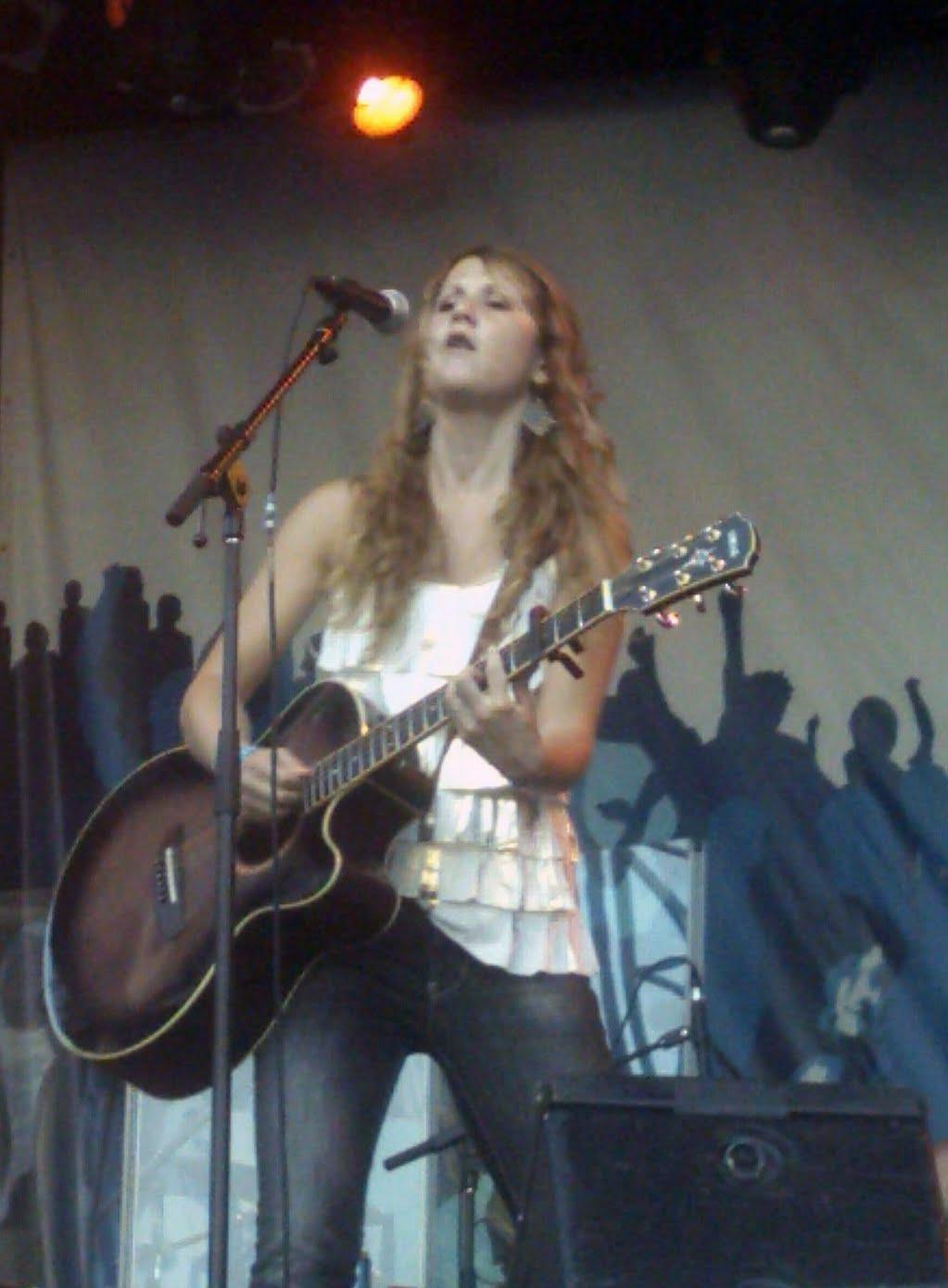

Background information
- Born: Amylie Boisclair; 1982 (age 42–43); Mascouche, Quebec, Canada
- Genres: Pop, folk-rock
- Occupations: songwriter, performer, recording artist
- Instruments: Vocals, Guitar
- Years active: 2010s-present
- Labels: Audiogram

Amylie Boisclair (born 1982) is a Canadian singer-songwriter from Quebec. She is most noted for her 2012 album Le Royaume, which was a shortlisted Juno Award nominee for Francophone Album of the Year at the Juno Awards of 2013.

Originally from Mascouche, Boisclair had her first experience in music when she played the role of Sandy in a production of Grease. She released her debut album Jusqu'aux oreilles in 2008, and followed up with Le Royaume in 2012. Her third album, Les Éclats, was released in 2016.

She has also performed in the group Louve, with Marie-Pierre Arthur, Ariane Moffatt, Salomé Leclerc and Laurence Lafond-Beaulne.
