= Pour déjouer l'ennui =

Studio album by Pierre Lapointe
- Released: October 18, 2019
- Length: 34:28
- Language: French
- Label: Audiogram; Columbia France
- Producer: Albin de la Simone

Pierre Lapointe chronology
Ton corps est déjà froid (2018)	Pour déjouer l'ennui (2019)	Chansons hivernales (2020)

Pour déjouer l'ennui (transl. To thwart boredom) is the tenth studio album by Canadian singer Pierre Lapointe, released through Audiogram and Columbia Records France on October 18, 2019. It is the final entry in a trilogy of albums for Lapointe, and was produced by Albin de la Simone. The album was debuted in a live performance at Club Soda in Montreal on October 15.

The album received two Juno Award nominations at the Juno Awards of 2021, for Adult Contemporary Album of the Year and Francophone Album of the Year.

== Background ==
Lapointe told Apple Music that he wanted to "recreate the concept of a campfire" and make an album that was "a bit softer, with no piano, just string instruments, some percussion—but not that much". He also called the album a "collection of lullabies for kids who have grown up". The album was also considered to be one that sounds as if it does not belong to a particular period of time.

== Track listing ==
Pour déjouer l'ennui track listing
No.	Title	Length
1.	"Tatouage"	2:59
2.	"La plus belle des maisons"	2:27
3.	"Pour déjouer l'ennui"	3:19
4.	"Un cœur qui saigne"	3:09
5.	"Le monarque des Indes"	2:50
6.	"Amour bohême"	2:25
7.	"Amour ou songe"	2:51
8.	"Dis-moi je ne sais pas"	3:25
9.	"Je connais le chemin"	2:43
10.	"Vivre ma peine"	2:23
11.	"Qu'est-ce qu'on y peut ?" (with Clara Luciani)	2:58
12.	"Vendredi 13"	2:59
Total length:		34:28

== Charts ==
Chart performance for Pour déjouer l'ennui
Chart (2019)	Peak position
Canadian Albums (Billboard)	11
French Albums (SNEP)	129
