= Pierre Lapointe =

Canadian singer-songwriter (born 1981)

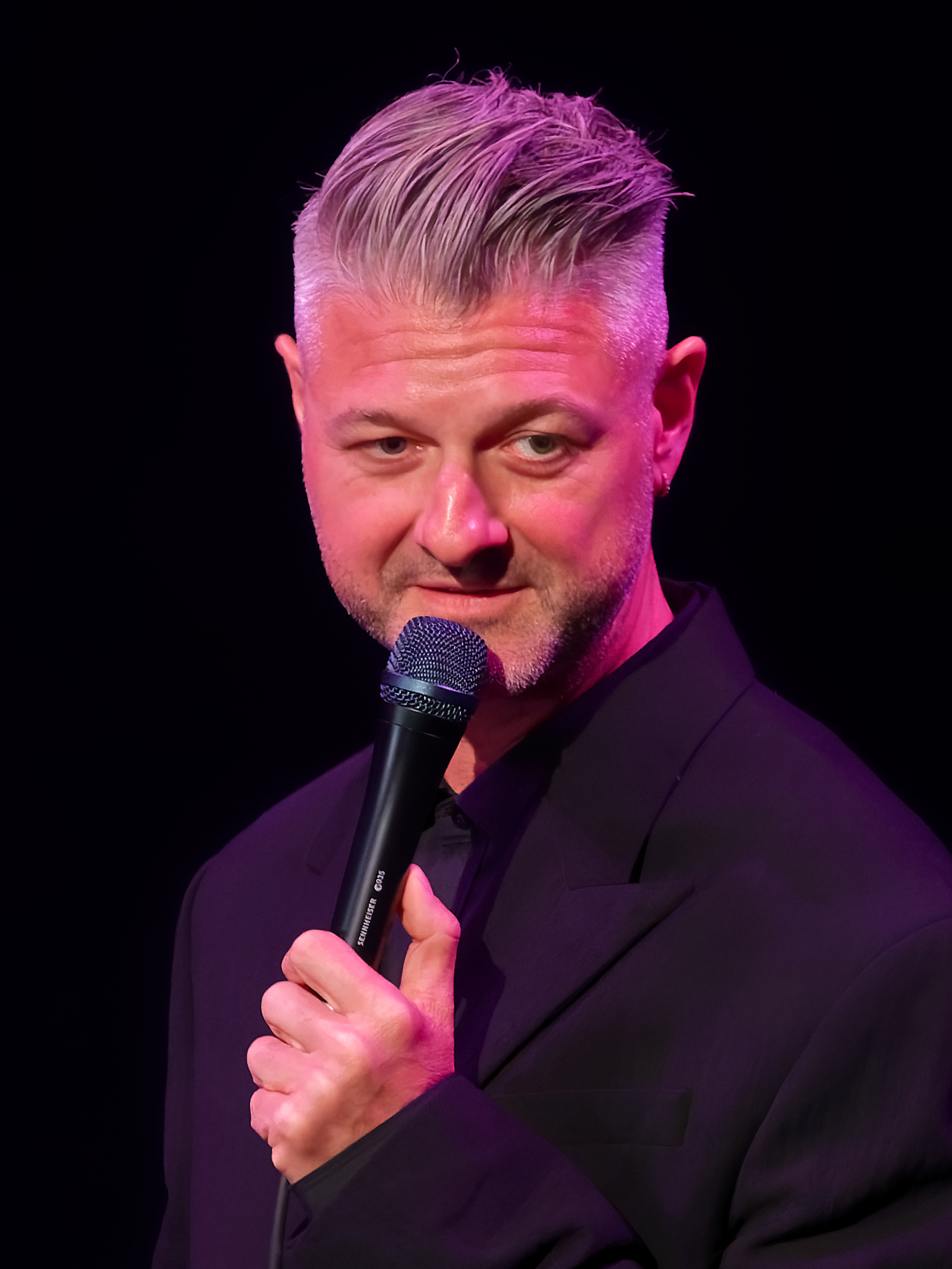
- Lapointe performing at the Festival en chanson de Petite-Vallée, June 2026

Background information
- Born: 23 May 1981 (age 45); Alma, Quebec, Canada
- Genre: Chanson
- Occupations: Musician, singer-songwriter
- Instruments: Vocals, keyboard
- Labels: Audiogram, Columbia France
- Website: www.pierrelapointe.com

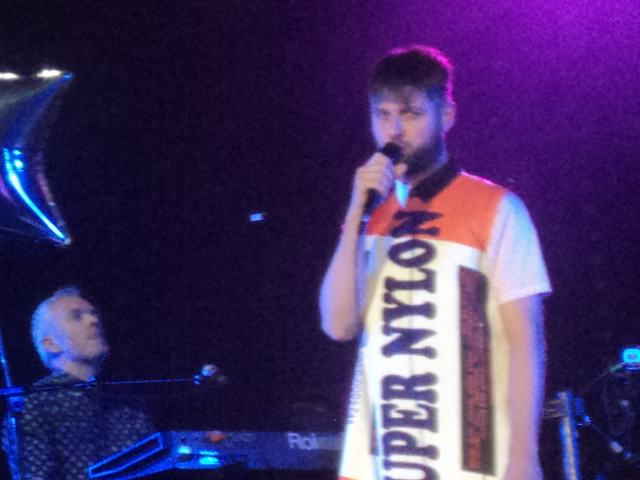
Pierre Lapointe at the FrancoFolies de Montréal (18 June 2014)

Pierre Lapointe (born 23 May 1981) is a Canadian singer-songwriter. His work largely follows the tradition of French chanson, though he is influenced by modern pop music. Defining himself as a "popular singer", he has built an egocentric persona of a dandy onstage, but says he does this mostly to deflect attention from himself. His records have found critical and commercial success in Canada. His regular tours in France ensured him growing popularity as well as critical recognition.

== Life and career ==
=== Early life ===
Pierre Lapointe was born in Alma, Quebec, and grew up in Gatineau.

He began studying visual arts in 1999, but changed his program and started to take theatre courses at the Cégep de Saint-Hyacinthe. He left after a few months to focus on songwriting, but later returned to complete his studies in visual arts. While there, he entered a competition called Tout nouveau, tout show. Lapointe won the "Award for Songwriter-Performer of the Year" and the "Audience Award". He moved to Montreal and continued studying art at the Université du Québec à Montréal (UQAM). In September 2001, he came first in the songwriter category at the Festival international de la chanson de Granby. In November 2002, he held two critically acclaimed shows in Montreal. In December, he received a grant from the Conseil des arts et des lettres du Québec which allowed him to prepare his first commercial album.

=== Initial success ===
In the summer of 2003, he signed on with Audiogram. He released his debut studio album, Pierre Lapointe, in May 2004 and it achieved platinum status in July 2006. In June 2004, he was invited to perform at the Festival Pully Lavaux in Switzerland, where he won the Jury Award. In July of the same year, at the FrancoFolies de Montréal, he played a full house for four days in a row, during which he won the Prix Félix‑Leclerc de la chanson.

In celebration of International Francophonie Day on 22 March 2005, he appeared as a guest speaker on Couleurs francophones, a radio show broadcast to French-speaking Europeans. In May 2005, he won the Académie Charles Cros Special Jury Award at the Alors... chante Festival in Montauban, France.

In October 2005, he won a total of six Félix Awards: three on his own for Pop Album of the Year, Newcomer of the Year and Art Direction of the Year, as well as three in conjunction with his collaborators, Jean Massicotte (for Arrangement of the Year and Producer of the Year) and Louis Simon Hétu (for Sound Technician of the Year). In November 2005, the Académie Charles Cros awarded him the Grand Prix du Disque for French Song for his album, Pierre Lapointe.

In March 2006, Lapointe released a second album, La Forêt des mal-aimés, which attained platinum status in July 2006. In October 2006, he received three more Félix Awards for La Forêt des mal-aimés: one for Songwriter of the Year, one for Pop Album of the Year and another in collaboration with Philippe Brault and Jean Massicotte for Arrangement of the Year. On 28 October 2007, he won a Félix Award in the category of "Performance of the Year – Singer-Songwriter" for La Forêt des mal-aimés during the 29th ADISQ Gala.

In April 2007, he joined Brigitte Fontaine in performing her song, La symphonie pastorale, at both the Printemps de Bourges music festival and the La Cigale concert hall in Paris. He was also the recipient of the 2007 Rapsat-Lelièvre Award for La Forêt des mal-aimés, which the jury considered to be of "exceptional quality".

In August 2007, Lapointe was joined by the Orchestre Métropolitain, with director Yannick Nézet-Séguin, to close the 19th annual FrancoFolies de Montréal. He performed for a crowd of over 100,100 – the largest in the festival's history.

He returned to the festival the next year, where he staged his new work, Mutantès, for four nights at the Place des Arts. Featuring a futuristic stage production by Claude Poissant, the show tells the story of a mutant on his quest for happiness.

Following the show's success, he reworked Mutantès into a studio album, releasing it under the title Sentiments humains. He again went on tour, concluding at the FrancoFolies de Montréal in June 2010, marking his ninth consecutive appearance at the festival. In January 2011, he released Pierre Lapointe Seul au piano, which saw him revisit earlier songs in a stripped-down form, featuring an unaccompanied Lapointe on piano. 2013 saw two new releases: a studio album proper, Punkt, and Les callas, an EP of short compositions and rough takes. In June of that year, Punkt was longlisted for the 2013 Polaris Music Prize.

=== International success ===
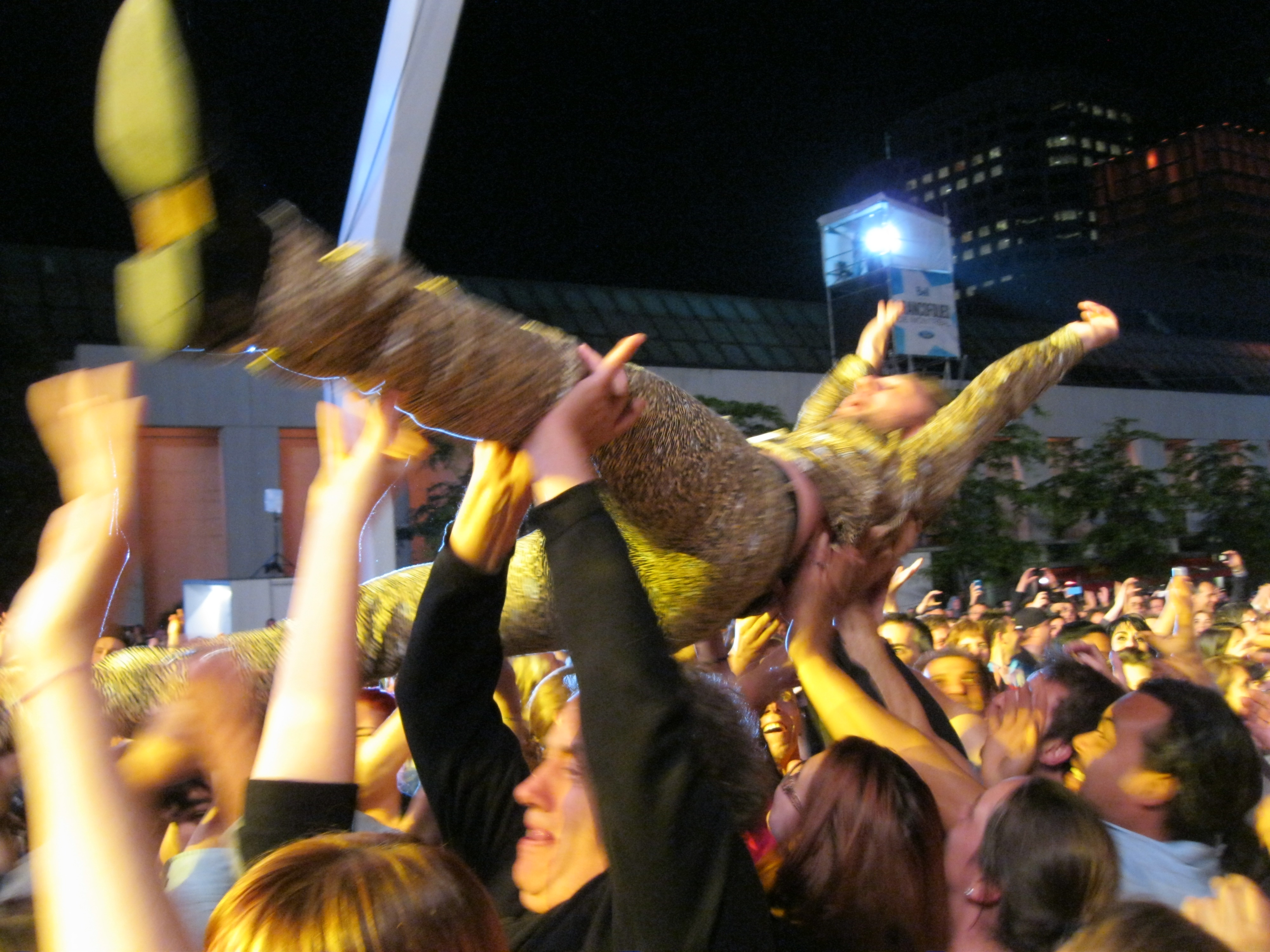
Lapointe crowdsurfing at the 25th FrancoFolies de Montréal in July 2013

In July 2014, he appeared at the Francofolies de La Rochelle in France. During this time, he hosted his own weekday radio show, Les Petites Morts, which was broadcast nationally on France Inter. In the program, Lapointe discussed some of his favourite artists and featured guests such as Christophe, Christine and the Queens and Alexandre Tharaud. The exposure greatly increased his popularity in France.

In November 2014, he released Paris tristesse in France and Belgium. The album, recorded in Paris, consists of reworked songs from Punkt as well as covers of French pop classics. The album was later released in Quebec on 10 February 2015.

He was a coach on La Voix, the Quebec edition of the international reality show The Voice, from its third to its fifth season, and returned in the eighth season.

In February 2022, Lapointe released L'heure mauve, a soundtrack album commissioned for the MMFA exhibition by visual artist Nicolas Party.

In 2022, Lapointe and Charlotte Cardin performed Daniel Lavoie's "Ils s'aiment" at the ceremony inducting Lavoie into the Canadian Songwriters Hall of Fame.

His 2025 album Dix chansons démodées pour ceux qui ont le cœur abîmé was shortlisted for the Juno Award for Francophone Album of the Year at the Juno Awards of 2026.

== Artistry ==
=== Themes ===
Failed relationships are often the subject of Pierre Lapointe's songs, though he prefers to maintain a degree of ambiguity as to the relationships in question, allowing for more diversity in interpretations. Another recurring theme in his work is death, which he believes has a far greater presence in music than either love or happiness. With La Forêt des mal-aimés (Forest of the Rejected), he explains that it is usually the feelings of sadness and heartbreak that move an audience. He strives to create a tender and melancholic atmosphere on stage. Rather than tell a story through his songs, he aims to elicit images and emotions. Lapointe considers his work to be symbolic, mystical and surreal, as well as abstract and avant-garde. His provocative words, which typically deal with sexuality, are a way to challenge the music industry, whose demands, he believes, have resulted in a culture of polite and acceptable music.

Although he is out as gay, he tends to keep his personal life private and is rarely open about who he is dating. He has, however, spoken out on occasion about experiencing public incidents of homophobia.

=== Influences ===
Pierre Lapointe has been described as having an eclectic style, drawing inspiration from genres as varied as disco, cabaret, and gospel. However, chanson and pop remain the foundation of his work. Among his influences, are French singer-songwriters (Léo Ferré, Serge Gainsbourg and Barbara), contemporary chanson artists (Matthieu Chédid and Vincent Delerm) and pop artists (Robert Charlebois, ABBA and France Gall). He also credits Diane Dufresne, Beck and Björk for shaping his musical development, claiming that, like his influences, he aims to innovate and bring an intellectual approach to popular music. However, he denies having invented anything new, asserting that his "postmodern" work simply seeks to revitalize French-language pop.

Visual arts and choreography play a prominent role in Pierre Lapointe's work, given his background in graphic arts and theatre. He works with dancers and many contemporary artists, particularly when producing music videos, and he often includes them on stage.

Lapointe has been influenced by visual artists like Jeff Koons, Takashi Murakami and Montreal native David Altmejd, whom he credits as a major inspiration for Mutantès In 2016, he collaborated with the French designer Matali Crasset, who designed the scenography for Amours, délices et orgues. Having been introduced to the Bauhaus and Dada movements at a young age, several of his shows (such as Mutantès) give the impression of being performance art. Lapointe has lamented the indifferent attitude toward contemporary art expressed in modern society and education.

== Awards and Honors ==
- Académie Charles‑Cros – Grand Prix Scène (Stage Grand Prize) — awarded to Pierre Lapointe in 2014.
- Félix Award – Male Artist of the Year (ADISQ) — Awarded in 2025 for his continued influence and success in Quebec's contemporary music scene.

== Discography ==
=== Studio albums ===
Year	Album	Peak positions			Certification
Year	Album	CAN	BEL (WA)	FRA	Certification
2002	Pierre Lapointe (Promotional CD; limited release)	—	—	—	
2004	Pierre Lapointe	—	—	—	
2006	La Forêt des mal-aimés	1	—	112	
2009	Sentiments humains	2	—	72	
2011	Seul au piano (also known as Pierre Lapointe Seul au Piano)	2	—	184	
2013	Punkt	1	—	—	
2013	Les Callas	—	—	—	
2014	Paris Tristesse	9	52	111	
2017	La Science du cœur	1	189	130	
2018	Ton corps est déjà froid (with Les Beaux Sans-Coeur)	73	—	—	
2019	Pour déjouer l'ennui	11	—	129	
2020	Chansons hivernales	10	—	—	
2022	L'heure mauve	—	—	—	
2025	Dix chansons démodées pour ceux qui ont le cœur abîmé	—	—	149	

=== Remix albums ===
Year	Album	Notes
2007	2 X2	24-minute small album with remixes of the album La Forêt des Mal-Aimés plus one previously unreleased track "le Maquis"
2007	25-1-14-14	Vinyl record. Limited re-release of 1000 copies of the album 2 X2 minus the track "Le Maquis"

=== Live albums ===
Year	Album	Peak positions
Year	Album	CAN
2007	En concert dans la forêt des mal-aimés (full title Pierre Lapointe en concert dans la forêt des mal-aimés avec l'Orchestre Métropolitain du Grand Montréal dirigé par Yannick Nézet-Séguin)	22

=== Songs / Videos ===
- 2004: "Le Columbarium"
- 2005: "Tel un seul homme"
- 2006: "Deux par deux rassemblés"
- 2007: "Qu'en est-il de la chance?"
- 2009: "Je reviendrai"
- 2009: "Au bar des suicidés"
- 2013: "La Sexualité" (with Random Recipe)
- 2013: "Nos Joies Répétitives"
- 2017: "Sais tu vraiment qui tu es"

=== Collaborations ===
- 2004: Various artists, Un dimanche à Kyoto, songs, tales and nursery rhymes by Gilles Vigneault: La Petite Adèle, La Petite Annette, C'est le vieux Pipo, Comptine en mode zen (with Ariane Moffatt, Garou, Luce Dufault, Luc De Larochellière, Martin Léon and Jessica Vigneault)
- 2005: Various artists, Aujourd'hui encore... Hommage à Charles Aznavour, Les plaisirs démodés (avec le Consort contemporain de Québec)
- 2006: Malajube, Trompe-l'oeil vocals on Montréal-40°
- 2006: Various artists, Salut Joe! Hommage à Joe Dassin, Les yeux d'Émilie
- 2007: Plaza Musique, L'amour et l'Occident, vocals on La ville aux deux soleils
- 2010: Young Artists for Haiti, K'naan's Wavin' Flag
