= Ian Kelly (songwriter) =

Canadian singer-songwriter (born 1979)

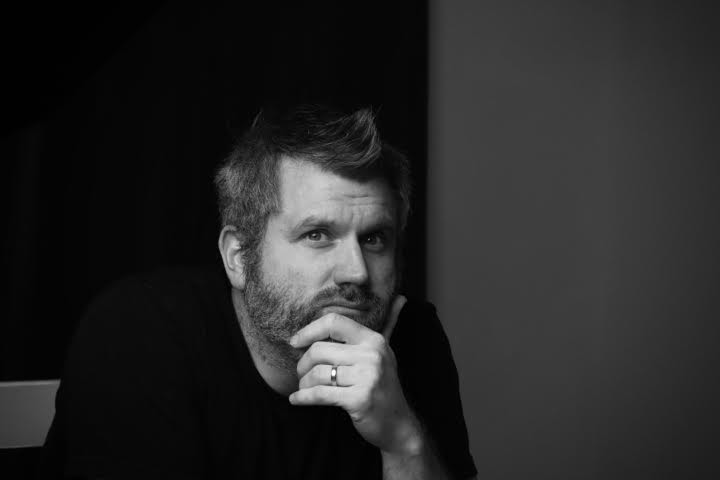
- Kelly in 2021

Background information
- Born: Ian Couture-Kelly; 30 March 1979 (age 47); Montreal, Quebec, Canada
- Genres: Pop; folk
- Occupation: Singer-songwriter
- Years active: 2000s–present
- Website: www.iankellysmusic.com

Ian Kelly (born Ian Couture-Kelly; 30 March 1979, Montreal, Quebec) is a Canadian singer-songwriter. He has released several full-length albums.

== Career ==
His first album, Insecurity, was self-produced and released in 2005. His second, Speak Your Mind, was released in 2008 by the Quebec indie label Audiogram. The album sold over 45,000 copies in Canada since its release and was certified gold in Canada by the CRIA in March 2011. His third album, Diamonds & Plastic, was released in May 2011 and sold over 15,000 copies in Canada. Kelly toured over 75 dates in support of Diamonds & Plastic in 2011–2012, including festivals in Canada, Belgium and France. All These Lines, his fourth album, was released on November 5, 2013.

Kelly was nominated for two Félix Awards at the Gala de l'ADISQ in 2009, 2012 and 2014. One was for Best Non-Francophone Artist, the other for Anglophone Album of the Year. In 2014, Kelly was nominated for two Félix Awards at the Gala de l'ADISQ for Best Non-Francophone Show and Anglophone Album of the Year.

== Discography ==
- Insecurity (2005)
- Speak Your Mind (September 2, 2008) – CRIA certified gold in March 2011
- Diamonds & Plastic (May 2011)
- All these lines (2013)
- Christmas Day (2014)
- Ian Kelly Live: All These Lines Tour (2015)
- Superfolk (2016)
- Innocent (2017)
- Long Story Short (2019)
