= Gogh Van Go =

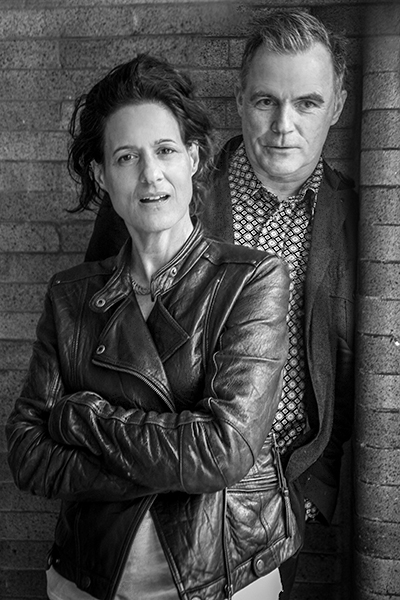

Background information
- Origin: Montreal, Quebec, Canada
- Genres: Folk rock
- Years active: 1993–1997, 2013–2014
- Label: Audiogram Records
- Members: Sandra Luciantonio; Daniel Tierney

Gogh Van Go is a Montreal alt-pop duo made up of Sandra Luciantonio and Daniel Tierney. Previously, Tierney and Luciantonio were both members of a 1980s country-rock group called the Hodads.

Luciantonio and Tierney met at the University of Guelph in Canada and formed a band in Montreal in 1985. Taking their name from the cover of an art magazine, the duo formed Gogh Van Go in 1993 and signed with Audiogram Records.

Through Audiogram Records, the group released two records. Their first album, the self-titled Gogh Van Go, released in 1993 and produced by Pierre Marchand, was part of the label's push into the English-speaking Canadian market. It was recorded and mixed at Studio Nomade, Morin Heights, Québec.

The record featured songs such as "Bed Where We Hide", "Say You Will" (re-mixed by James Di Salvio of Bran Van 3000 fame), and "Tunnel of Trees", which won Lyne Charlebois the Juno Award for Best Video in 1995, as well as a cover of John Lennon's "Instant Karma!". Their second album, Bliss Station, was released in 1997.

In celebration of the 20th anniversary of their debut album, the duo reunited to perform in December 2013, with what was reported to be a "one-night-only" reunion show at the Cabaret du Mile End in Montreal. Luciantonio and Tierney were joined by their original line up, including Yves Desrosiers (Jean Leloup, Lhasa de Sela), guitar; Jean Massicotte, keyboards and samples; John Souranis (Men Without Hats, Hodads, Jerry Jerry), bass; and John McColgan (Kate & Anna McGarrigle, Michel Pagliaro, Stephen Barry Band), drums. That same year, Audiogram released a compilation on iTunes, The Best of Gogh Van Go, which included the Say You Will remix produced by James Di Salvio and a forgotten track from the first album. Brendan Kelly of the Montreal Gazette proclaimed the Gogh Van Go concert as his live music event of the year.

In 2014, the group returned to the studio to record two new songs, Sugar and Mama Needs a New Dress, written by Luciantonio with Yves Desrosiers, and produced by keyboardist Jean Massicotte.

On 26 June 2014, the band returned to the live stage as a part of the 2014 Montreal International Jazz Festival.

== Discography ==
=== Albums ===
- Gogh Van Go (1993)
- Bliss Station (1997)

=== Singles ===
- "Say You Will" (1993)
- "Call It Romance" (1993)
- "The Bed Where We Hide" (1993)
- "Big Cook" (1997)

== Awards ==
- Gogh Van Go won the 1995 Juno Award for Best Video for their song, "Tunnel of Trees".
