= Paris Tristesse =

Studio album by Pierre Lapointe
- Released: February 10, 2015
- Length: 46:23
- Language: French
- Label: Audiogram
- Producer: Jacques Ehrhart

Pierre Lapointe chronology
Les Callas (2013)	Paris Tristesse (2015)	La Science du cœur (2017)

Paris Tristesse is an album by Québécois singer and keyboardist Pierre Lapointe, released on February 10, 2015. It reached a peak position of number nine on the Top Canadian Albums chart.

== Track listing ==
1. "Les lignes de ma main" – 1:52
2. "Je déteste ma vie" – 3:26
3. "Nos joies répétitives" – 4:07
4. "Tous les visages" – 2:32
5. "Les remords ont faim" – 3:21
6. "Nu devant moi" – 3:14
7. "Au 27-100 rue des Partances" – 2:55
8. "La plus belle des maisons" – 2:31
9. "Tel un seul homme" – 3:59
10. "Quelques gouttes de sang" – 1:40
11. "Tu es seul et resteras seul" – 2:36
12. "S'il te plaît" – 1:57
13. "C'est extra" – 3:51
14. "Le mal de vivre" – 3:45
15. "Comme ils disent" – 4:37

Track listing adapted from AllMusic.

== Charts ==
Chart (2015)	Peak position
Belgian Albums (Ultratop Wallonia)	52
Canadian Albums (Billboard)	9
French Albums (SNEP)	73
Swiss Albums (Schweizer Hitparade)	85
