= Marie-Pierre Arthur =

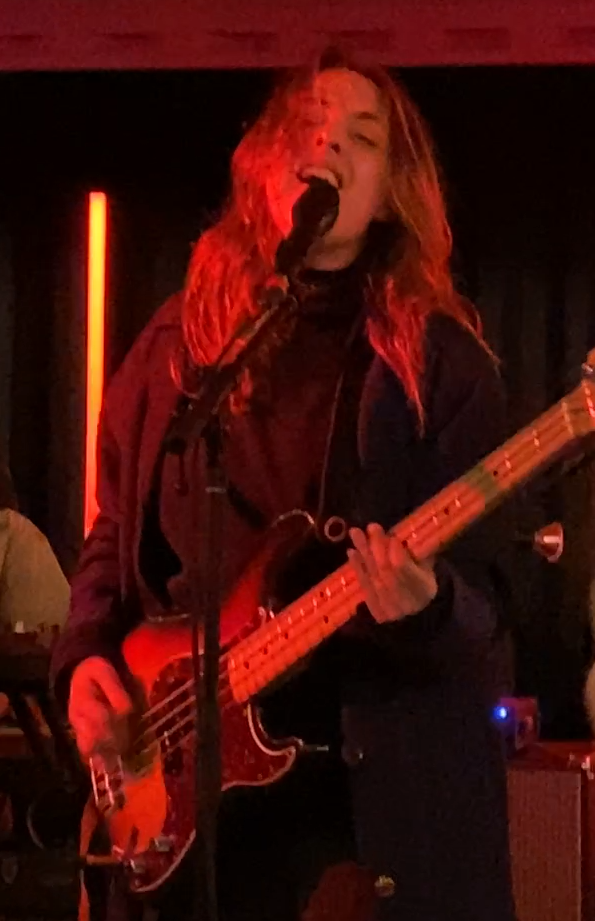
- Marie-Pierre Arthur in 2025

Background information
- Born: Grande-Vallée, Quebec, Canada
- Origin: Canada
- Genre: Pop
- Occupations: Musician, singer-songwriter
- Instruments: Guitar
- Years active: 2009–present
- Label: Bonsound

Marie-Pierre Arthur is the stage name of Marie-Pierre Fournier, a Canadian pop singer-songwriter from Quebec. Originally from Grande-Vallée, she is currently based in Montreal.

Formerly a backing musician and vocalist for artists such as Karkwa, Galaxie, Ariane Moffatt, Stefie Shock, Nanette Workman and Édith Butler, she released her self-titled debut album as a solo artist in 2009. Her follow-up, Aux alentours, was released in 2012 and was named as a longlisted nominee for the 2012 Polaris Music Prize on June 14, 2012. She also appeared as a guest vocalist on Buck 65's 20 Odd Years.

She won the Félix Leclerc Prize for best new singer-songwriter at the 2012 FrancoFolies, and was nominated for several Prix Félix at the 2009 and 2010 ADISQ awards.

In 2013, she won an Independent Music Award for her album Aux alentours in the Pop Album category.

Her third album, Si l’aurore, was released on February 16, 2015, via Simone Records.

She has also performed in the group Louve, with Salomé Leclerc, Ariane Moffatt, Amylie and Laurence Lafond-Beaulne.

== Discography ==
- Marie-Pierre Arthur (2009)
- Aux alentours (2012)
- Si l'aurore (2015)
- Des feux pour voir (2020)
- Album bleu (2024)
