= Milk & Bone =

Canadian electropop duo

- Origin: Montreal, Quebec, Canada
- Genres: Electropop; synth-pop; indietronica
- Years active: 2013–present
- Label: Nettwerk Music Group
- Members: Laurence Lafond-Beaulne; Camille Poliquin

Milk & Bone are a Canadian electropop duo based in Montreal, Quebec, consisting of Laurence Lafond-Beaulne and Camille Poliquin. Their debut album Little Mourning, released in 2015 via Bonsound, was a longlisted nominee for the 2015 Polaris Music Prize. Although both of the band members are francophones, they write and record in English.

== History ==
The duo first met as music students at Cégep de Saint-Laurent, and later performed with David Giguère's touring band. They decided to begin writing and performing as a duo after being brought in as guest vocalists on Misteur Valaire's 2013 album Bellevue.

Since Milk & Bone write and record in English and the majority of their immediate friends and colleagues are francophone, they used SoundCloud to connect with potential contributors to the album, including Toronto-based rapper Terrell Morris on the track "Tomodachi".

In 2015, Milk & Bone released their first album called Little Mourning. The duo, recipient of the SOCAN Breakout Award at the Francophone SOCAN Awards in Montreal, charmed audiences here and elsewhere with their electro pop and mesmerizing harmonies. That year their track "Pressure" was streamed more than a million times on SoundCloud. Little Mourning has allowed the group to carve out a place on the long list of the 2015 Polaris Music Prize, a nomination to the 2016 Juno Awards in the Revelation of the Year category (Group) as well as three prizes at the GAMIQ in 2015.

Before starting to write their second album, the duo take up the challenge of composing the soundtrack feature King Dave by Podz. The film's theme song, Natalie, was nominated for the 2017 Canadian Screen Awards in the Best Original Song category and has more than 4.6 million views on Spotify. The song appeared in the third episode of Dontnod Entertainment's 2019 video game Life Is Strange 2 in 2019.

Milk & Bone released a single, "Daydream", in 2017, with a promotional video. Their second album, Deception Bay, was released on February 2, 2018. The album allows to Milk & Bone to win the Juno award for the Electro Album of the Year in early 2019 as well as a nomination on the long list of the 2018 Polaris Music Prize. The show that accompanied the album was awarded at the 2019 ADISQ Gala in the Show of the Year - Anglophone category. Also, they were nominated for a GAMIQ award for Quebec Artist of the Year.

In 2018, Milk & Bone performed at the Festival d’été de Quebec, and also performed in Toronto.

At the start of 2019, they launched an EP, DIVE, which won the EP pop of the year award at the 2019 GAMIQ.

For the second time in their career, Milk & Bone was able to work on the composition of the soundtrack for a film produced by Podz, Mafia Inc.. In addition, they also worked on the composition of the music for two new shows by Cirque du Soleil, Cosmos and Exentricks, which have been presented on board the cruise ship MSC Grandiosa since November 2019.

Lafond-Beaulne has also performed in the group Louve, with Salomé Leclerc, Ariane Moffatt, Amylie, and Marie-Pierre Arthur.

== Awards and nominations ==
=== Nominations ===
- Nomination on the long list of the Polaris Music Prize (2015)
- Revelation of the Year (Group) at the Junos (2016)
- Best Original Song for "Natalie" at the Canadian Screen Awards (2017)
- Nomination on the long list of the Polaris Music Prize (2018)
- Artist of the Year at the GAMIQ (2019)

=== Awards ===
- SOCAN Breakout Award (Francophone SOCAN Awards)
- Pop Album of the Year at the GAMIQ (2015)
- Revelation of the Year at the GAMIQ (2015)
- Song of the Year for "Coconut Water" at the GAMIQ (2015)
- Electro Album of the Year at the Junos (2019)
- Show of the Year - Anglophone at the ADISQ (2019)
- EP Pop of the Year at the GAMIQ (2019)

== Discography ==
=== Albums ===
- Little Mourning (2015)
- Deception Bay (2018)
- Chrysalism (2022)
- Lost Records: Bloom & Rage (2025)

=== EP ===
- DIVE (2019)
- A Little Lucky (2025)
