= La Science du cœur =

Studio album by Pierre Lapointe
- Released: October 6, 2017
- Length: 36:23
- Label: Audiogram · Columbia France
- Producer: David François Moreau

Pierre Lapointe chronology
Paris Tristesse (2014)	La Science du cœur (2017)	Ton corps est déjà froid (2018)

La Science du cœur is a studio album by Pierre Lapointe, released through Audiogram and Columbia Records France on October 6, 2017.

== Reception ==
The album made the long list for the 2018 Polaris Music Prize, and received a Juno Award nomination for Francophone Album of the Year. It won the award for "Album of the Year – Adult Contemporary" at the 40th ADISQ Gala.

== Track listing ==
1. "La Science du cœur" – 4:08
2. "Qu'il est honteux d'être humain" – 2:48
3. "Sais-tu vraiment qui tu es" – 3:29
4. "Le retour d'un amour" – 4:28
5. "Mon prince charmant" – 3:05
6. "Comme un soleil" – 2:46
7. "Zopiclone" – 2:56
8. "Alphabet" – 3:46
9. "Naoshima" – 2:01
10. "Un cœur" – 3:35
11. "Une lettre" – 3:21

== Charts ==
Chart (2017)	Peak position
Belgian Albums (Ultratop Wallonia)	189
Canadian Albums (Billboard)	1
French Albums (SNEP)	130
