= MASI Lugano =

Museum in Lugano, Switzerland

- Museo d'arte della Svizzera italiana
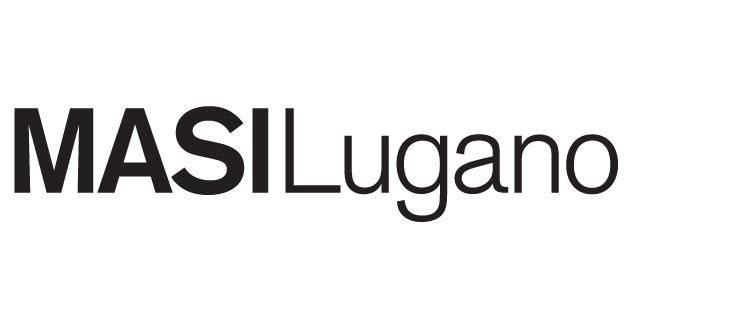

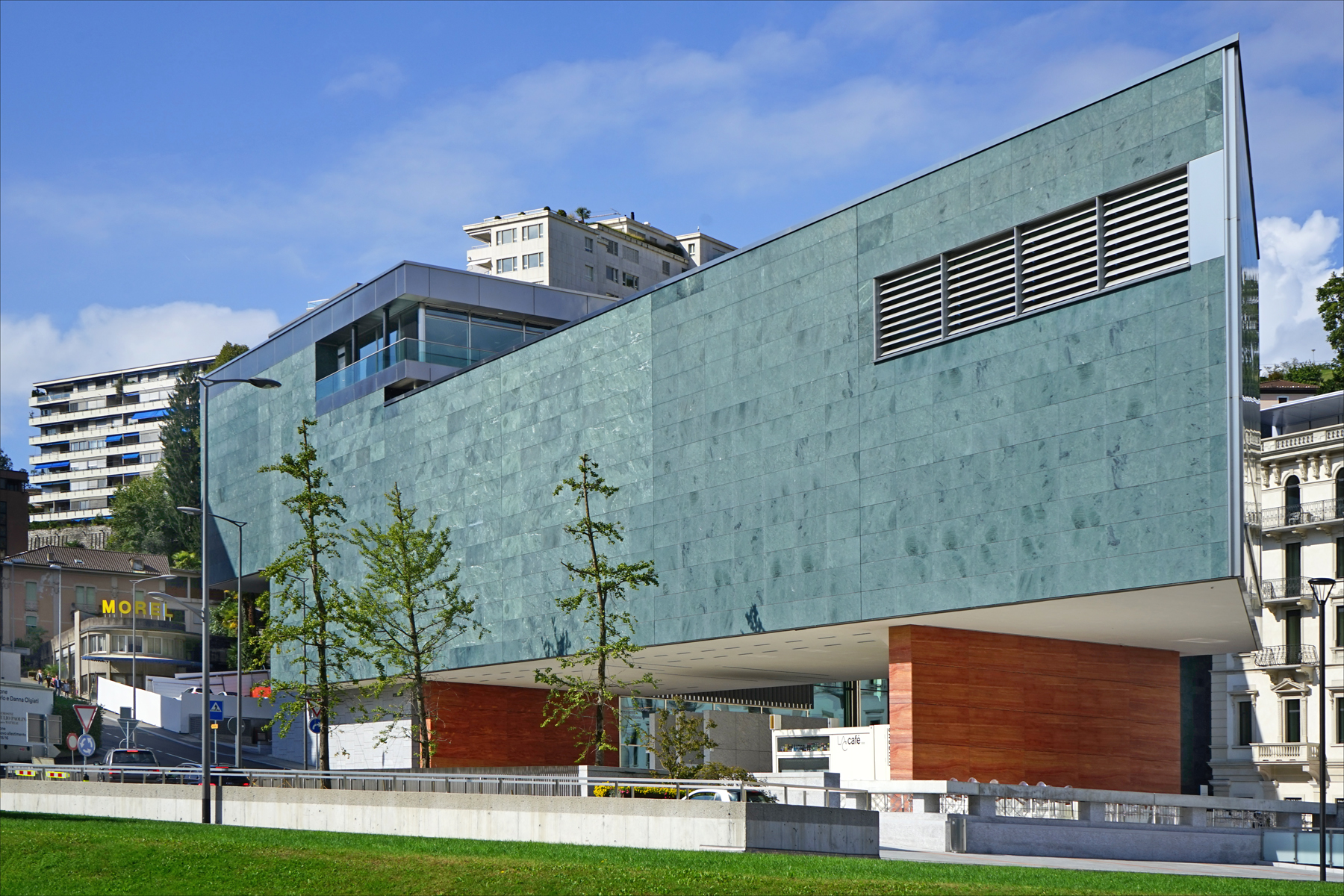
- MASI Lugano at the Lugano Arte e Cultura
- Established: September 12, 2015
- Location: Piazza Bernardino Luini 6, 6901 Lugano, Switzerland
- Coordinates: 45.9994°N 8.9482°E
- Type: Art museum
- Director: Tobia Bezzola (2018–present)
- Website: www.masilugano.ch

The Swiss–Italian Art Museum (Italian: Museo d'arte della Svizzera italiana), commonly known as MASI Lugano, MASILugano or MASI, is an art museum predominantly featuring 20th-century and contemporary art in Lugano, Switzerland. Since December 2019, the museum has two locations, one in the Lugano Arte e Cultura (LAC) art center, and one in the Palazzo Reali.

== History and about ==
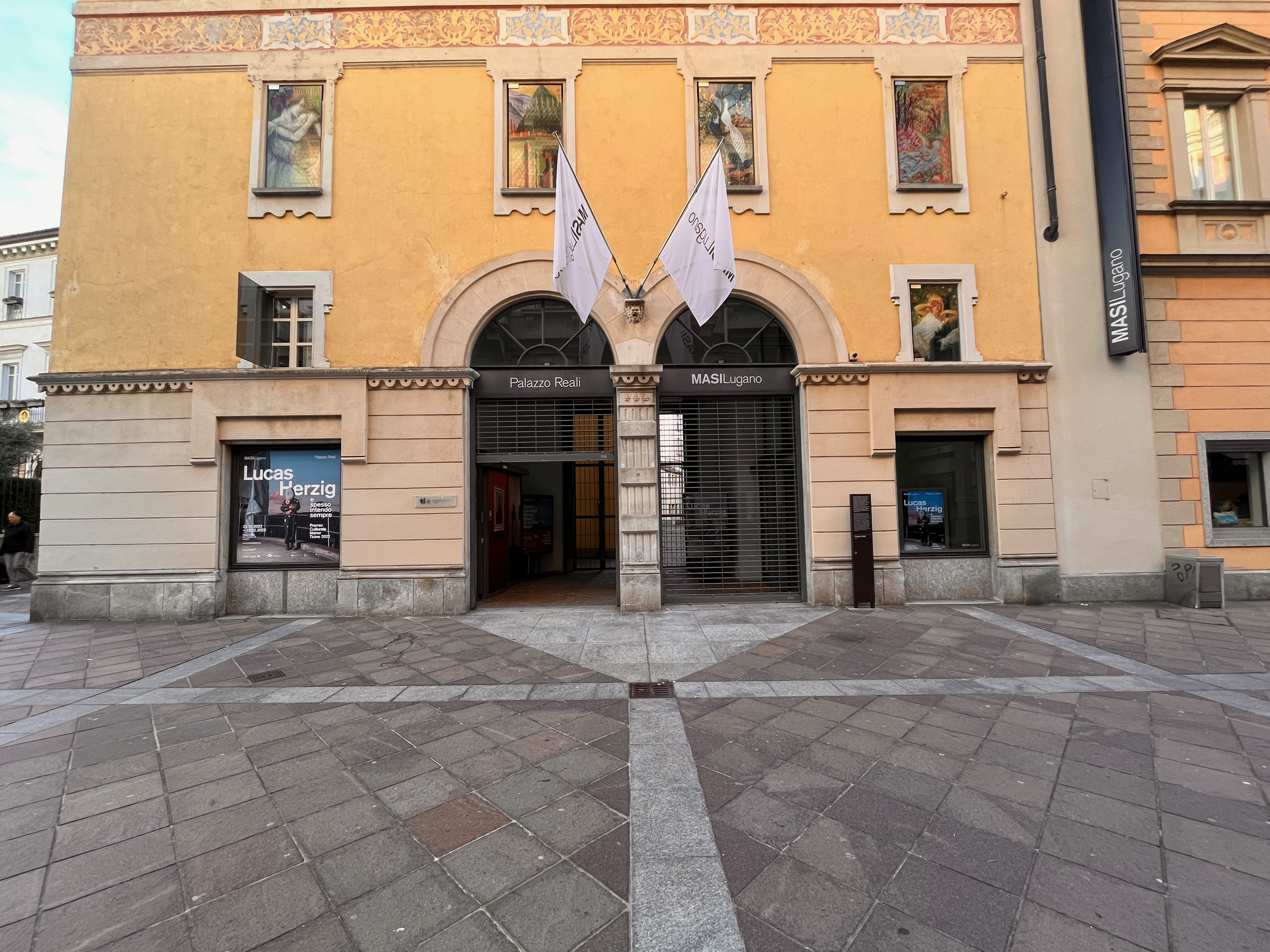
MASILugano at Palazzo Reali

The museum was created through the merger of the Museo Cantonale d'Arte with the Museum of Modern Art, Lugano, two public art institutions in the city of Lugano, and it opened on September 12, 2015. The museum collection is primarily focused on the 19th and 20th centuries of art, with works mainly coming from the Canton of Ticino. They particularly focus on artists of Italian-speaking Switzerland.

Since 2018, Tobia Bezzola serves as the museum director, succeeding Marco Franciolli who left the position in late-2016.

In 2022–2023, the museum hosted the Manor Cultural Prize, a Swiss national fine arts prize awarded every two years and exhibition.

== See also ==
- List of contemporary art museums
- List of museums in Switzerland
