= Beau Dommage =

Canadian rock band

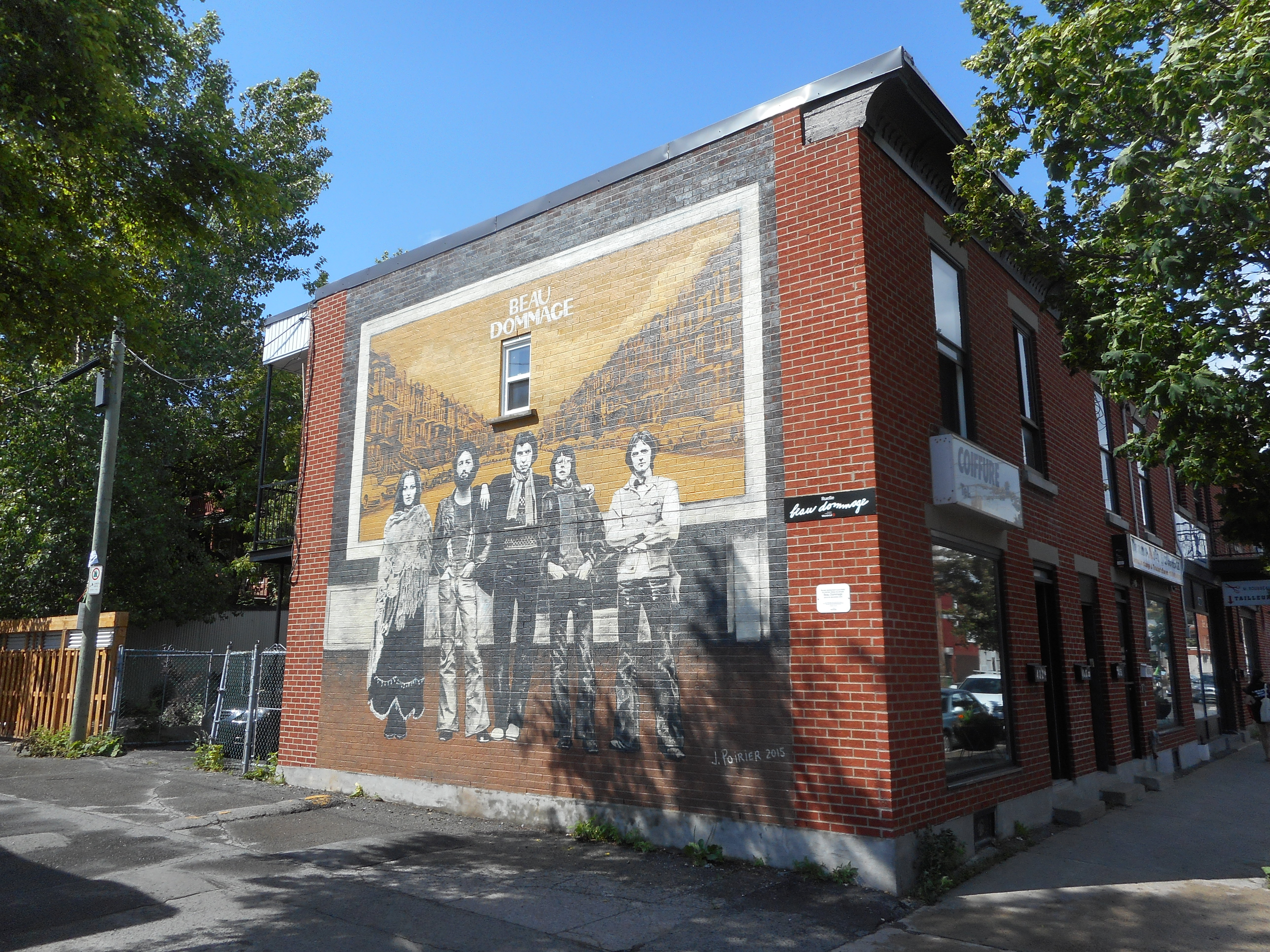
- Mural in Montreal commemorating Beau Dommage

Background information
- Origin: Montreal, Quebec, Canada
- Genres: Rock; folk rock
- Years active: 1974–1978; 1994–1995
- Labels: Capitol; Audiogram
- Past members: Pierre Bertrand; Marie-Michèle Desrosiers; Réal Desrosiers; Michel Hinton; Pierre Huet; Robert Léger; Michel Rivard

Beau Dommage was a Canadian rock band from Montreal, Quebec, who achieved success in Quebec and France in the 1970s. The group's style included rich vocal harmonies and elements borrowed from folk and country music.

== History ==
Beau Dommage started in 1972 as an offshoot of the theatrical group "La Quenouille Bleue". Founders Pierre Huet, Robert Léger and Michel Rivard were joined by Pierre Bertrand, Réal Desrosiers and Marie Michèle Desrosiers (no relation). Their name is a Quebec French expression meaning "most certainly" or "why not."

The group's first album, Beau Dommage, was released in 1974 and broke sales records at the time. The next year, Où est passée la noce? reached Platinum (as awarded by the CRIA before May 1, 2008, 100,000 units) on its first day of sales. The group met with considerable success on its yearly tours of Europe between 1975 and 1978, and also performed on numerous occasions in Quebec and the rest of Canada.

The group disbanded in 1978 and reunited in 1984 to perform twice at the Montreal Forum and, from those concerts, produce two live albums. They reunited one last time in 1994 to produce a second self-titled album Beau Dommage and tour Quebec in 1995. They showed up during the 2005 Francofolies in Montreal and were honoured by the other artists.

On 19 July 2013, Canada Post issued an undenominated permanent commemorative postage stamp depicting the seven members of Beau Dommage. It was sold in booklets of 10, or as part of a souvenir sheet of four alongside Rush, the Guess Who, and the Tragically Hip.

== Members ==
- Pierre Bertrand - guitar, bass, vocals
- Marie Michèle Desrosiers - keyboard, vocals
- Réal Desrosiers - drums
- Michel Hinton - keyboard (starting in 1975)
- Pierre Huet - songwriter
- Robert Léger - keyboard, flute
- Michel Rivard - guitar, melodica, keyboards, vocals

== Discography ==
Albums

- Beau Dommage (1974), Capitol Records
- Où Est Passée La Noce? (1975), Capitol Records
- Un Autre Jour Arrive En Ville... (1977), Capitol Records
- Passagers (1977), Capitol Records
- Au Forum De Montréal (1984), Polydor
- Au Forum De Montréal Vol. 2 (1984), Polydor
- Leurs Plus Grands Succès En Spectacle (1988), Polydor
- Beau Dommage au Forum (1992), Capitol Records
- Beau Dommage (1994), Audiogram, L'Équipe Spectra
- Rideau (1995), Audiogram

Singles

- "Le Picbois" / "A Toutes Les Fois" (1974)
- "Tous Les Palmiers" / "Montreal" (1975)
- "Harmonie Du Soir A Chateauguay" / "La Complainte Du Phoque En Alaska" (1975)
- "Tous Les Palmiers" / "Le Géant Beaupré" (1975)
- "C'est Samedi Soir" (1976)
- "Le Blues D'la Métropole" / "Assis Dans'cuisine" (1976)
- "Heureusement Qu'il Y A La Nuit" / "Bon Debarras" (1976)
- "Amène Pas Ta Gang" (1976)
- "Motel Mon Repos" / "J'ai Oublié Le Jour" (1976)
- "Gisèle En Automne" / "Générique" / "Son Ancien Chum" (1977, EP)
- "Seize Ans En Soixante Seize" / "Contre Lui" (1977)
- "Tout Va Bien" / "Marie-Chantale" (1977)
- "Hockey" / "Le Coeur Endormi" (1977)
- "Berceuse Pour Moi Toute Seule" (1977)
- "Rouler La Nuit" / "Le Passager De L'Heure De Pointe" (1977)
- "Le Rapide Blanc" (1984)
- "Échappé Belle" (1994)
- "Tout Simplement Jaloux..." / "Grande Cheminée" (1994)

Compilations

- Les Grands Succès De Beau Dommage (1978), Capitol Records
- Plus De 60 Minutes Avec... Beau Dommage (1987), Capitol Records
- L'intégrale (1991), Capitol Records
- Le Meilleur De Beau Dommage (1990), EMI France
- Anthologie (1999), EMI Canada
- L'album De Famille (2009), EMI Canada
- Photos De Famille (2010), Musique EMI Canada
- Des Airs De Famille (2010), EMI Canada
- Icon (2013), Universal Music Canada
- Coffret 40e Anniversaire (2014), Universal Music Canada

== Awards and nominations ==
- Nominee: Most Promising Female Vocalist of the Year, Juno Awards of 1975
- Nominee: Group of the Year, Juno Awards of 1976
- Nominee: Best Selling Album, Beau Dommage, Juno Awards of 1976
- Winner: Group of the Year, Félix Awards, 1995
- Nominee: Best Selling Francophone Album, Beau Dommage, Juno Awards of 1996
