= Chango Family =

Canadian band

La Chango Family is a Montreal, Quebec based band that plays a mixture of reggae, ska, funk, and other genres of music, which is often called world music.

The band was formed in 2000 by singer/author/composer Lundo (Xavier Vacher) Chango after the breakup of Le Clan Destino and has played in many different configurations from the acoustic Trio Chango to the larger productions of La Chango Family Circus and Chango Family Soundsystem.

With over 40 musicians since its creation, the sound of the band has evolved constantly throughout the years, from its reggae/gypsy hippyish roots, to the more big band sounds and finally the return to the composers punk roots and a much heavier guitar laden sound with more sombre mood and themes.

The band's songs are written in French, Spanish, and English, often in the same song. There are also many songs which use African languages like Wolof as well as some songs in Arabic.

== Performances ==
La Chango has played over 700 shows in 8 years with over 150 in Europe. In 2004, their second European tour, "Monkeys in Babylon," saw them play over thirty shows, while the 2005 tour to promote their double CD, Babylon Bypass, saw them play over 40 shows in two months in Europe. They won the Choix du Public at the 2004 Montreux Jazz Festival and performed the outdoor spectacle de cloture at the 2005 festival.

Since then they have performed at many of the best known indie music festivals in Europe such as Esperanzah (Belgium), Reperkusion (Galicia, Spain), Festival de la Cite in Lausanne, Reggae Sunska (France) and many more.

They have performed at the leading French music festival, Les Francofolies on a few occasions and headlined their outdoor shows (40-50,000 people) in Montreal, both in 2002 and 2006, while in 2003 they played 20 shows in 14 days at the Francofolies on a specially built stage for their La Chango Family Circus show which combined music with aerial artists, acrobats, jugglers and clowns. After having played Les Francofolies in Belgium in 2005 to both critical and popular acclaim, the band became in 2006 one of the few acts to play all three Francofolies (Canada, Belgium and France) in the same year.

== Releases ==
After releasing the self-titled Chango Family on the Audiogram record label in 2002, garnering a Top 10 hit in Quebec for the song "Paramatman," the group left the label in 2003 to start their own 'fair trade' label, Zion Zone Recordz and released a double CD titled Babylon Bypass consisting of 26 original cuts.

La Chango also has released three live CD bootlegs: Gypsie Reggaie 100% (2001), Monkeys in Babylon (2004), Mother Soccer Tour Live (2006), and a concert/documentary DVD entitled L'Annee du Singe (2007) by the prize winning director and photographer TSHI who also has directed the band's videos.

The band has written music for several films and TV shows and Lundo Chango wrote the soundtrack for the 2009 documentary Traveling Light which premiered at the Montreal International Film Festival.

The CD visuals and posters are created by Yves Archambault, who has created the visuals for the Montreal Jazz Festival for over two decades.

== Band members ==
- Lundo Chango: vocals, guitar
- Maruchka: vocals, djembe, percussion, dance
- Gabou: bass, vocals
- Anit Yam: violin, guitar
- Sylvio: drums
- Funky Francky: vocals, organ, keyboards, accordion, clarinet
- Matéo: trombone
- Mario: saxophone, flute
- Didace: lead guitar
- Koumba: vocals, dance
- Racko: keyboard

=== On certain tours ===
- Marco: congas, percussion
- Sébastien Rivard: dub, effect and sound
- J-F: tenor sax
- Dom: trumpet
- Pru: vocals

== Side projects and collaborators ==
- Kaliroots
- DobaCaracol
- Syncop
- Oztara
- Papa Groove
- La Galère
- Elektrik Bones
- SimonGauthier.com
