= Robin F. Williams =

American painter

Robin F. Williams (born 1984, Columbus, Ohio) is a contemporary painter based in Brooklyn, New York. Her work addresses the themes of identity, gender, and perception and references source material such as social media, folklore, historical portraiture, and cinema.

Discussing her work in the New York Times, chief art-critic Roberta Smith asserts, “The paintings are extravagantly in-your-face regarding execution, style, image and social thrust. They take aim at the impossible idealizations of women in both art and advertising, depicting mostly nude and aloof androgynous supermodels, and the occasional feline, with a new kind of cool yet visceral bravura.”

== Early life and education ==
Williams began her artistic journey at the age of five, when her grandmother got her involved with art lessons at a gift shop. She lived in Columbus, Ohio for eighteen years and then moved to New York.

In 2006 she received a BFA from the Rhode Island School of Design, Providence, Rhode Island and has been exhibiting work since 2005.

== Work ==
=== Practice ===
Williams works in both oil and acrylic, utilizing layers of brushwork, airbrushing, stenciling, and sponging to achieve her vivid imagery and highly stylized figures.

In an interview with Forbes (2024), Williams states, “I like to think of the figures in my work as having some amount of self-awareness or consciousness and it's a way to play with the power dynamic between the viewer and the figure in the painting.” In her work, Williams confronts stereotypes of female sexuality and representation in pop culture.

=== Themes and Influences ===
In an interview with Ted Loos, published by The New York Times (2024), Williams speaks about the influence of George Tooker, Édouard Manet and George de La Tour, whose works deploy queer subtext, implications of the viewer, and chiaroscuro respectively.

In recent works like Slumber Party Martyrs (2023), Williams takes inspiration from horror films, stating "We live vicariously through these feminized emotions, which are human emotions. For me, it’s about gaining access to the full range of emotions that we’ve decided are appropriate only for certain genders at certain times." In many of her paintings, her female figure's gazes await the viewers' eyes, exploring the themes of women becoming their own agents in the experience of being viewed.

In her exhibition Good Mourning (2024), these works also explore constructions of gender in portraiture as seen with her earlier works, but focus on a retelling of the female narrative in horror films and psychological thrillers. Her paintings assume a transformed narrative and alternative ending for these female protagonists who are otherwise depicted in a cycle of abuse in these slasher films.

Commenting on her exhibition Out Lookers (2021) with Cultured Magazine, Williams says "The pieces in Out Lookers are concerned with our relationship with the environment, more specifically our understanding of our bodies as separate from the environment and the problems that arise from that hierarchical misconception. We think of nature as something we can control, dominate and exploit indefinitely. The environment is just our own larger body. In this exhibition, the solidness of the figures is purposefully ambiguous. There’s no clear distinction between their bodies and the environment. They’re all windows onto a larger system that connects them all." She states how some of her work such as A Sound Around No One was influenced by art historical references including Edvard Munch’s The Scream and Francisco Goya’s Saturn Devouring His Son.

In Your Good Taste Is Showing (2017), Williams presents women in the poses of fashion-magazine advertising.

== Exhibitions ==
Williams had her first solo museum show in Columbus, Ohio, at the Columbus Museum of Art titled Robin F. Williams: We’ve Been Expecting You in 2024.

Williams work has been exhibited across the United States and internationally. Her notable solo exhibitions include Undying (2024), Perrotin, Tokyo; Good Mourning (2024), P·P·O·W, Broadway, NY; Watch Yourself (2023), Morán Morán, Mexico City; Out Lookers (2021), P·P·O·W, New York; and With Pleasure (2019), Various Small Fires, Los Angeles.

In 2024, Williams exhibited in a group show titled Le vernissage, partie un at Brigitte Mulholland, Paris along with Katherine Bradford and other artists.

She has been exhibited at galleries including Bard College at Simon’s Rock, Perrotin, P.P.O.W. Gallery, Grand Central Art Center at CSUF, The Hole NYC, and Sargent’s Daughters. Williams’ exhibitions have been noted in publications such as the New York Magazine, BOMB Magazine, Forbes, and Juxtapoz.

== Selected works ==
- Robin F. Williams. Good Mourning, 2024. Oil on canvas.
- Robin F. Williams.The Phone Call, 2024. Oil on canvas.
- Robin F. Williams, Dear Jane, 2024. Oil on canvas.
- Robin F. Williams, Prom Night Reckoning, 2023. Oil and acrylic on canvas.
- Robin F. Williams, Final Girl Exodus, 2021. Oil and acrylic on canvas.
- Robin F. Williams. Out Lookers, 2021. Oil and acrylic on canvas
- Robin F. Williams. Troll, 2021. Oil, acrylic and Flashe on canvas.
- Robin F. Williams. Siri Keeps the Faith, 2021. Oil and acrylic on canvas.
- Robin F. Williams. Speak of the Devil, 2021. Acrylic on canvas.
- Robin F. Williams, A Sound Around No One, 2021.Acrylic and oil stick on canvas
- Robin F. Williams. Ghost in Labor, 2020. Oil and acrylic on canvas.
- Robin F. Williams. Bechdel Yetis, 2020. Oil, acrylic and Flashe on canvas.
- Robin F. Williams, Space Angel, 2020. Oil, acrylic, and oil stick on canvas
- Robin F. Williams. Siri Defends Her Honor, 2019. Oil and acrylic on canvas.
- Robin F. Williams. Good Sport, 2019. Acrylic and oil on canvas

== Public collections ==
- Beth Rudin DeWoody Collection, West Palm Beach, FL, USA
- Brooklyn Museum, Brooklyn, NY, USA
- CC Foundation, Shanghai, China
- Collection Majudia, Montreal, Canada
- Columbus Museum of Art, Columbus, OH, USA
- Institute of Contemporary Art, Miami, FL, USA
- Montreal Museum of Fine Arts, Montreal, Canada
- X Museum, Beijing, China
- Zabludowicz Collection, London, UK
