= Nicolas Party =

Swiss artist

- Born: 1980 (age 45–46); Lausanne, Switzerland

Nicolas Party (born 1980, Lausanne, Switzerland) is a Swiss visual artist. He lives and works in New York City and Brussels. He is known for his multi-media interdisciplinary immersive exhibitions.

== Biography ==
He received his BFA degree from the École cantonale d'art de Lausanne in 2004 and his MFA from the Glasgow School of Art, in Glasgow, Scotland in 2009.

Party's work has been the subject of solo exhibitions at the Montreal Museum of Fine Arts, Montreal, the Magritte Museum in Brussels, the Dallas Museum of Art, and the Hirshhorn Museum. For his second exhibition at the Hirshorn Museum which ran from September 18, 2021, until the spring of 2022 he created his largest work to date Draw the Curtain, it "wraps 360 degrees around the temporary scaffolding that encases the Museum building and spans a circumference of 829 feet". It is an "original pastel painting digitally collaged and printed onto scrim". Party's exhibition "When Tomorrow Comes" at the Museum Frieder Burda is the Swiss artist's first museum presentation in Germany. Party' primary medium of choice is pastel.

In February 2020 he had his first solo exhibition, "Scottsboro" with Hauser & Wirth at their Los Angeles, California venue. In 2017 he had his first solo exhibition, "Three Season" with Xavier Hufkens.

Among the artists Party cites as having influenced his painting are Rosalba Carriera, Félix Vallotton, Milton Avery, Pablo Picasso, and Giorgio Morandi.

Party's landscapes often draw from or even directly cite styles and motifs from a diverse set of contemporary painters and painters of previous generations, including Salvo, a similarity picked up at a number of exhibitions.

== Bibliography ==
- Stéphane Aquin, Nicolas Party: Mauve Twilight, 5 Continents Editions, Milan, 2022
- Stéphane Aquin, Stefan Banz, Ali Subotnick, Melissa Hyde, Nicolas Party, Phaidon, London, 2022
- Louis Fratino, Glenn Fuhrman, Loie Hollowell, Dodie Kazanjian, Billy Sullivan, Robin F. Williams, Melissa Hyde, Nicolas Party: Pastel, The FLAG Art Foundation, New York, 2021
- Tobia Bezzola, Francesca Bernasconi, Michele Robecchi, Nicolas Party: Rovine, Museo d'Arte della Svizzera Italiana, Lugano, 2021
