= Robert Léger =

- Born: June 24, 1948 (age 76); Montreal, Quebec, Canada
- Genres: Folk rock, folk, rock
- Occupation(s): Singer-songwriter, author, poet
- Instrument(s): Keyboard, flute
- Years active: 1974–present

Robert Léger is a Canadian songwriter from Quebec, responsible for writing many of Beau Dommage's biggest hits. Along with bandmates Pierre Huet and Michel Rivard, he studied at the Université du Québec à Montréal as part of the Quenouille Bleue, a theatre group at the school, during the early 1970s.

Léger has written a large number of the band's popular songs from their self-titled debut album Beau Dommage. In 1985, Léger collaborated with Germain Gauthier and Daniele Faubert on the song "L'Amour a pris son temps" for the film soundtrack The Dog Who Stopped the War (La Guerre des tuques). The song garnered a Genie Award nomination for Best Original Song. He has also composed film scores.

He composed the music for Geneviève Lapointe's post-punk hit Pied de poule in 1982 (Marc Drouin wrote the lyrics).

While Léger no longer makes music, he now holds teaches songwriting at the National School of Music at the CÉGEP of Granby, Québec.

== Distinctions ==
- Médaille d'honneur de l'Assemblée nationale, 2009
