= Ariane Moffatt =

Canadian singer-songwriter (born 1979)

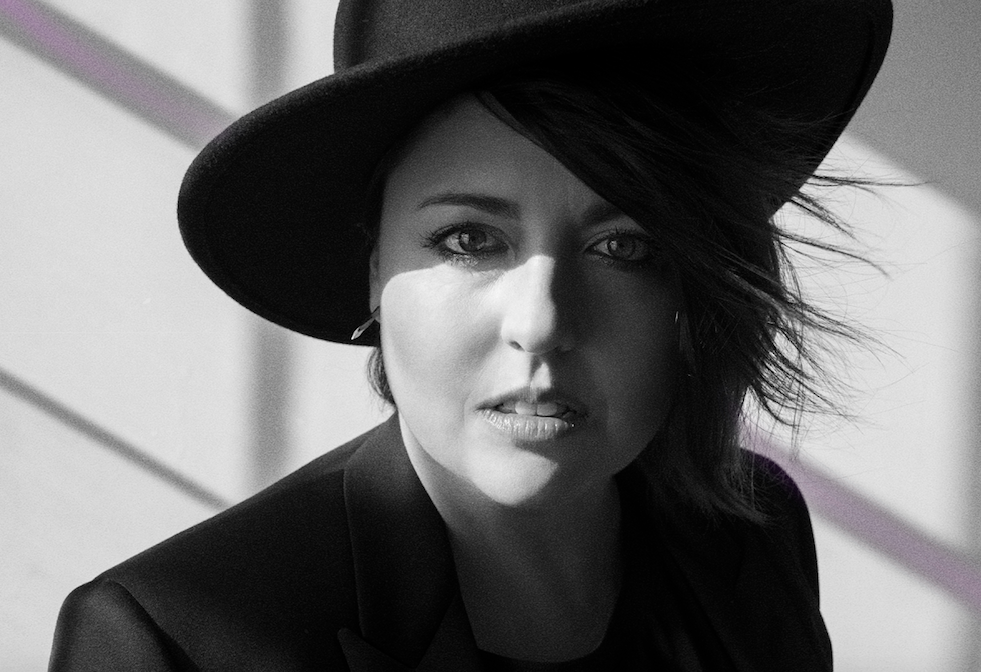

Background information
- Born: 26 April 1979 (age 46); Saint-Romuald, Quebec, Canada
- Instruments: Piano, guitar, drums, synthesizer
- Label: Audiogram
- Website: arianemoffatt.com

Ariane Moffatt (born 26 April 1979) is a Canadian singer-songwriter. Known for working across multiple musical genres, Moffatt's music combines elements of electronica, jazz, folk, and pop. A francophone, she is bilingual and has recorded tracks in both French and English. Her 2002 debut album Aquanaute went platinum in Quebec, earning 11 nominations at the 2003 ADISQ Awards and winning three Félix awards (for Discovery of the Year, Album of the Year – Pop/Rock, and Album Producer of the Year). She is known in Quebec for two well-received singles from Aquanaute: "La barricade" and "Dans un océan".

== Early life ==
Moffatt grew up in Saint-Romuald, a suburb of Quebec City on the south shore of the St. Lawrence River. After completing Grade 11, she moved to Montreal where she earned a Diplôme d'études collégiales in music at Cégep de Saint-Laurent, then a Baccalauréat in popular music and classical singing from UQAM.

== Career ==
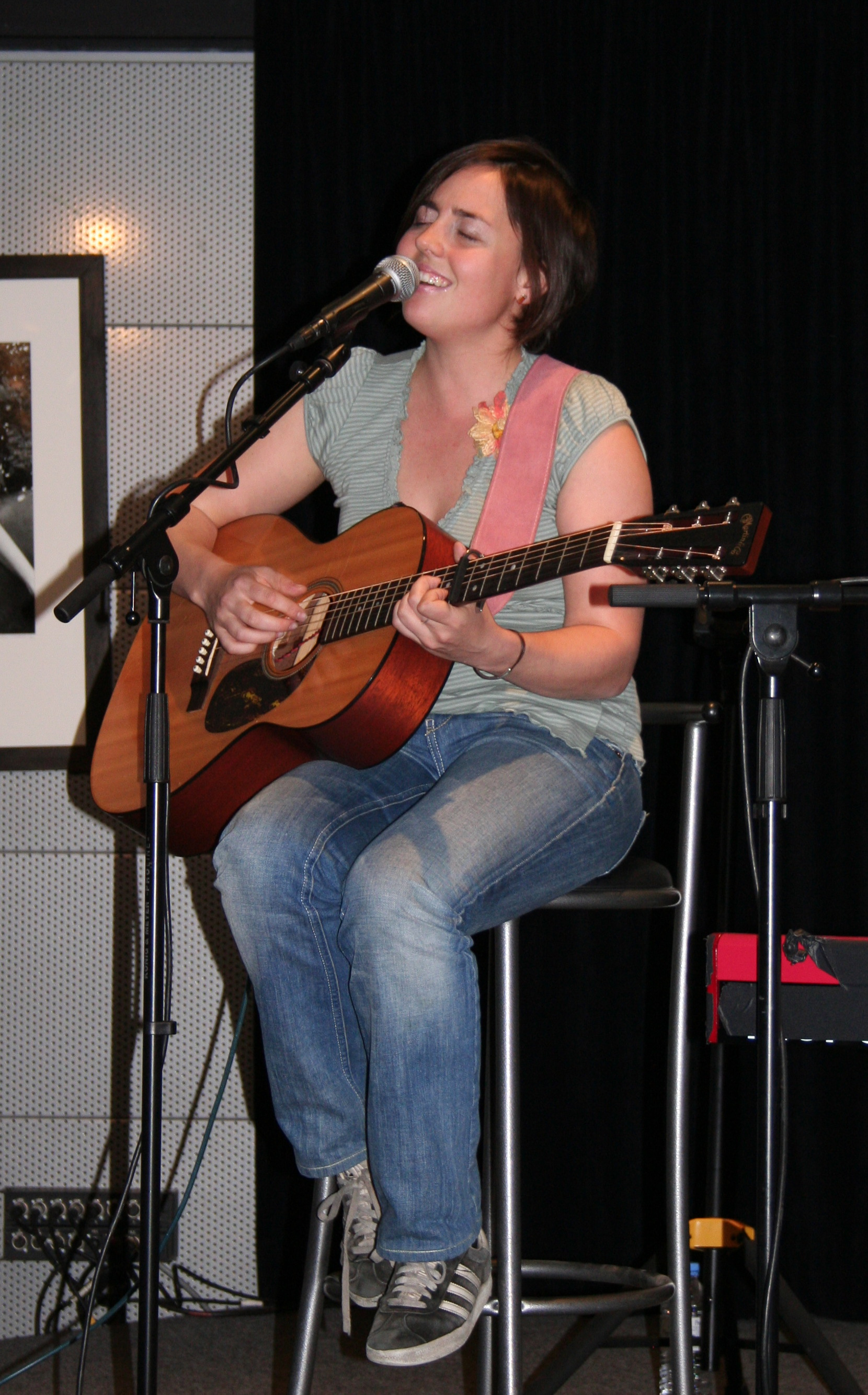
Ariane Moffatt in Paris, 2006

After university, Moffatt went on tour with singer Marc Déry. This led to an invitation in 2001 from singer-songwriter Daniel Bélanger to join his band as a keyboardist and vocalist in support of his well-received album Rêver mieux. Her debut solo album Aquanaute was released in 2002 on the Audiogram label in Canada and on the EMI/Virgin label in Europe in 2005.

In 2004, Moffatt met French rock musician Matthieu Chedid at Montreal's FrancoFolies music and performance festival. She subsequently remixed Chedid's "La Bonne Étoile" (from his 2003 album Qui de nous deux) as a virtual duet. Her version of the popular song received wide airplay in France and helped introduce her to French music fans. The track was scheduled to be included on a future re-release of Aquanaute.

In 2005, Moffatt released her first music DVD, Ariane Moffatt à la Station C, which received a 2006 Juno Award nomination for Music DVD of the Year. Her second album, Le cœur dans la tête (meaning Heart in the Head) was released later that year.

Moffatt opened for French musician Alain Souchon at the Olympia (a Montreal theatre and concert venue) in 2006.

Moffatt collaborated with Franco-Israeli singer-songwriter Yael Naim on her 2008 release Tous les sens (meaning All the Senses), which was awarded Francophone Album of the Year at the 2009 Juno Awards. She also contributed vocals to the song "Sweet Light" on Tales from the City, the second album from Montreal alternative band Mobile.

In 2010, Moffatt contributed twelve tracks (all covers of English-language songs) to the popular Radio-Canada medical show Trauma, which were subsequently released as a soundtrack album. Songs included "Everybody Hurts" by R.E.M., Leonard Cohen's "In My Secret Life" and "Hallelujah", and Martha Wainwright's "Far Away". Montreal's Hour alternative newsweekly declared that Moffatt "owns these songs so hard you have to wonder if anyone will ever be able to pry them away from her". The soundtrack went on to reach Gold status in Canada. That same year she was nominated for "Best Breakthrough Live Act of the Year" at France's Victoires de la Musique awards.

Moffatt's fourth album, MA (the title references both the Japanese concept of negative space and Moffatt's initials) was released in 2012. It marked the first time the singer has composed songs in English. In an interview with Hour Moffatt explained that the effort had been inspired by her surroundings: "My studio is in Mile End, I live nearby as well, the neighbourhood is bilingual and so is the music scene I'm attracted to, which is very palpable around here," she told Hour. "I was looking for a space to compose, somewhere inspiring and luminous. I was on a kind of sabbatical, exploring and playing around, with no deadline to make an album. I was just composing and recording here in my little bubble, all by myself. I ended up with a bunch of songs, half of them in English, half in French."

Moffatt was a judge on season 1 of La voix and returned for season 4.

Moffatt has also performed in the group Louve, with Salomé Leclerc, Marie-Pierre Arthur, Amylie and Laurence Lafond-Beaulne. In March 2019, she was one of 11 singers from Quebec, alongside Ginette Reno, Diane Dufresne, Celine Dion, Isabelle Boulay, Luce Dufault, Louise Forestier, Laurence Jalbert, Catherine Major, Marie Denise Pelletier and Marie-Élaine Thibert, who participated in a supergroup recording of Renée Claude's 1971 single "Tu trouveras la paix" after Claude's diagnosis with Alzheimer's disease was announced.

In 2024 she had an acting role in the musical comedy film Sisters and Neighbors! (Nos belles-sœurs).

== Personal life ==
On 26 February 2012, Moffatt came out as lesbian in an interview with Guy Lepage on the popular Quebec talk show Tout le monde en parle. On 14 February 2013, Moffatt announced that her fiancée was pregnant with twins, due for summer 2013. The two boys, Paul and Henri, were born on 9 July of that year.

== Discography ==
=== Studio albums ===
| Title | Album details | Peak chart positions | | |
| Title | Album details | CAN | BEL (WA) | FRA |
|---|---|---|---|---|
| Aquanaute | Released: 4 June 2002; Format: CD; Label: Audiogram | — | — | — |
| Le cœur dans la tête | Released: 15 November 2005; Format: CD, digital download; Label: Audiogram | — | — | 126 |
| Tous les sens | Released: 22 April 2008; Format: CD, digital download; Label: Audiogram | 2 | 88 | 68 |
| MA | Released: 26 February 2012; Format: CD, digital download; Label: Audiogram | 2 | — | — |
| 22h22 | Released: 10 March 2015; Format: CD, digital download; Label: Audiogram | 4 | — | — |
| Petites mains précieuses | Released: 19 October 2018; Format: CD, digital download; Label: Simone | 42 | — | — |
| Incarnat | Released: 26 March 2021; Format: CD, digital download; Label: Simone | 41 | — | — |
"—" denotes album that did not chart or was not released.

=== Live albums ===
| Title | Live album details |
|---|---|
| À la Station C | Released: 10 May 2005; Label: Audiogram |

== Videography ==
- 2002: "Point de mire"
- 2003: "La Barricade"
- 2003: "Poussière d'ange"
- 2004: "Fracture du crâne"
- 2005: "Hasard"
- 2005: À la station C (DVD)
- 2006: "Montréal"
- 2008: "Réverbère"
- 2009: "Jeudi, 17 mai"
- 2009: "Je veux tout"
- 2012: "Mon Corps"
- 2012: "In Your Body"
- 2012: "Too Late"
- 2015: "Debout"

== Awards and nominations ==
2016: Berlin Music Video Awards, nominated in the Best Performer category for 'DEBOUT'
