= Marie-Michèle Desrosiers =

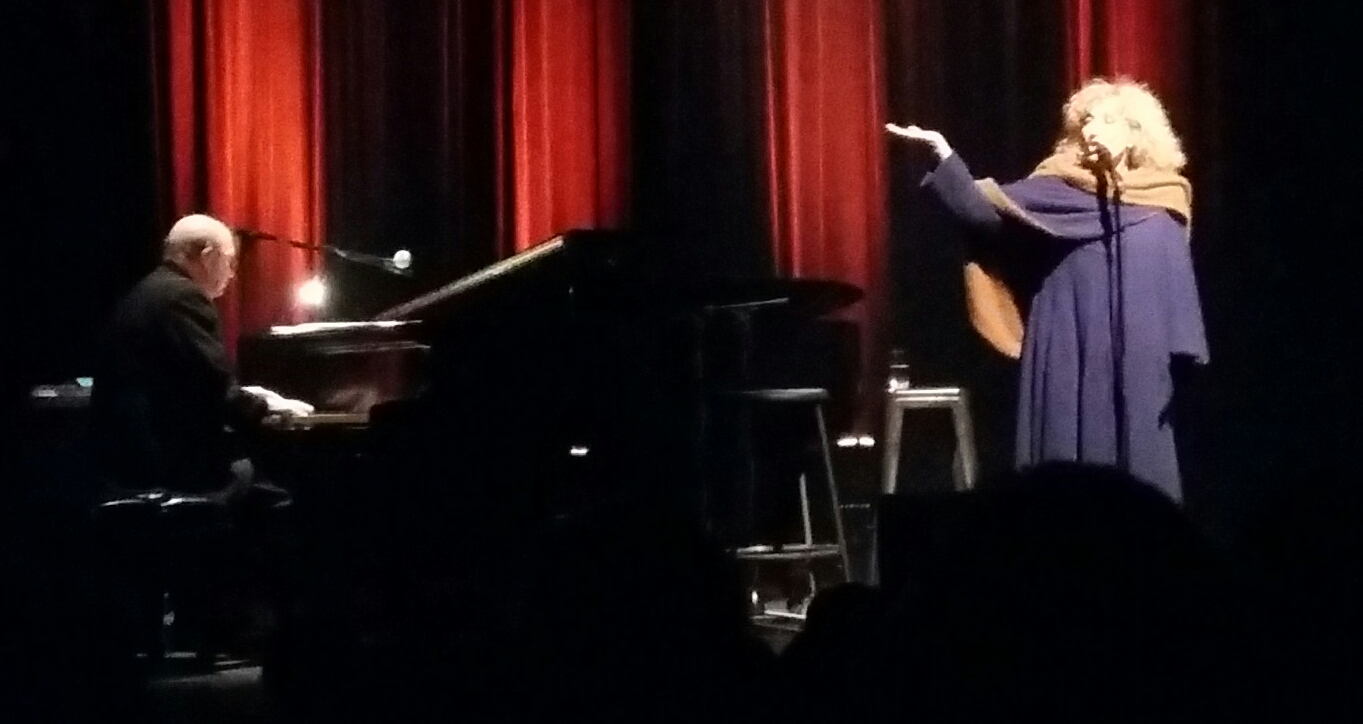
Marie-Michèle Desrosiers photographed in Montreal, Quebec, Canada at the L’Entrepôt.

Marie-Michèle Desrosiers (born March 6, 1950) is a Canadian pop and rock singer from Quebec. She is most noted as a former member of the influential rock group Beau Dommage, and for her album Marie Michèle Desrosiers chante les classiques de Noël, which won the Juno Award for Francophone Album of the Year at the Juno Awards of 1998.

Desrosiers studied piano at Collège Lionel-Groulx and acting at the National Theatre School of Canada before joining Beau Dommage as a singer and keyboardist. She appeared on all of the band's four albums during its original run in the 1970s; on Passagers, she received her first songwriting credit for "Le Coeur endormi".

Following the band's breakup in the late 1970s, Desrosiers pursued a solo career, releasing her self-titled debut album in 1980. She released a second album, Plus fort, in 1983 before participating in Beau Dommage's 1984 reunion concert. She followed up in 1985 with Aimer pour aimer, and recorded vocals for François Dompierre's soundtrack to the 1985 film The Alley Cat (Le Matou). Throughout this time she also took a number of acting roles, predominantly in stage and musical theatre.

She participated in the recording of Beau Dommage's reunion album in 1994.

She released Marie Michèle Desrosiers chante les classiques de Noël, her first album of Christmas music, in November 1996. Her most commercially successful album, it sold over 100,000 copies in Quebec within just a few weeks of its release. In addition to the album's Juno Award win, it was a shortlisted finalist for Album of the Year, and Desrosiers for Female Singer of the Year, at the Prix Félix in 1997.

In 2002, she followed up with Marie-Michèle Desrosiers chante Noël avec le choeur de l'Armée rouge, an album recorded in Moscow with the Red Army Choir. Her other albums have included C'est ici que je veux vivre (2000), Mes mélodies du bonheur (2004) and Marie-Michèle se défrise (2008).

She has had supporting roles in films, including Robert Ménard's Exit and Denys Arcand's Days of Darkness (L'Âge des ténèbres). More recently, she has continued to pursue a smaller-scale musical career, touring Quebec to perform Christmas music concerts with church and community choirs.
