= Audiogram (label) =

Canadian music record label

- Parent company: Quebecor
- Founded: 1984
- Country of origin: Canada
- Location: Montreal, Quebec
- Official website: www.audiogram.com

Audiogram is an independent record label founded in Quebec in 1984. The label represents performers who have contributed to and have marked Quebec's cultural scene.

In the 1990s, Audiogram became home to many of the top local French artists and in 1993 expanded into the English-speaking Canadian market with Montreal rock group Gogh Van Go. By 1997, Audiogram had a full slate of multicultural and multilingual releases.

In February 2021, it was acquired by conglomerate Quebecor, along with music publishing division Éditorial Avenue.

== Roster ==
- Alex Nevsky
- Amylie
- Anastasia Friedman
- André Gagnon
- Ariane Moffatt
- Ariel
- Béatrice Bonifassi
- Belles-Soeurs
- Bïa
- Bran Van 3000
- Carla Bruni
- Damien Robitaille
- Daniel Bélanger
- GRUBB
- Ian Kelly
- Isabelle Boulay
- Jean-Pierre Ferland
- Jason Bajada
- Jim Corcoran
- Karkwa
- Kevin Parent
- Lhasa de Sela
- Loco Locass
- Loud Lary Ajust
- Mara Tremblay
- Marc Déry
- Marc-André Gautier
- Matt Holubowski
- Paul Piché
- Peter Peter
- Philémon Cimon
- Pierre Flynn
- Pierre Lapointe
- Pink Martini
- Salomé Leclerc
- Yves Desrosiers
- Zébulon

Other names associated with Audiogram include:

- Adam Chaki
- Alain Comeau
- Alain Lefèvre
- Alex Champigny
- Beau Dommage
- Carl Bastien
- Chango Family
- Clément Jacques
- Cycle Pop
- Fredric Gary Comeau
- Freeworm
- Gogh Van Go
- Ily Morgane
- Jean Leloup
- JF Lemieux
- Laurence Jalbert
- Laurent Garnier
- Llorca
- Magneto
- Magnolia
- Marie-Jo Thério
- Marie-Michèle Desrosiers
- Michel Rivard
- Monica Freire
- Océane
- Paul Ahmarani
- Paul Kunigis (earlier known as Jesczse Raz)
- Richard Séguin
- Ringo Rinfret
- Rock et Belles Oreilles
- Sara Anastasia
- Senaya
- Steve Hill
- The National Parcs
- The Sound of Sea Animals
- Tom Poisson
- Urbain Desbois
- Vilain Pingouin
- Yves Duteil
- Yves Marchand
- Zachary Richard

== See also ==
- List of Quebec record labels
- List of Quebec musicians
- Music of Quebec
- Culture of Quebec
- List of record labels
