= Philippe Brault =

Canadian producer

- Born: 1981 (age 44–45)
- Origin: Montreal, Quebec, Canada
- Occupations: Record producer, Film score composer

Philippe Brault (born 1981) is a Canadian record producer and film score composer from Montreal, Quebec. He is most noted as a two-time Prix Iris winner for Best Original Music, winning at the 21st Quebec Cinema Awards in 2019 for The Fireflies Are Gone (La disparition des lucioles) and at the 24th Quebec Cinema Awards in 2022 for Drunken Birds (Les Oiseaux ivres).

He has received two other nominations in the category, alongside Pierre Lapointe at the 14th Jutra Awards in 2012 for The Salesman (Le vendeur) and in 2022 for Maria Chapdelaine, and was a Canadian Screen Award nominee at the 7th Canadian Screen Awards in 2019 for The Fireflies Are Gone.

His other film credits include All That We Make (Fermières), The Procession (Le Cortège), A Revision (Une révision), Norbourg, The Origin of Evil (L'Origine du mal) and Villeneuve: The Rise of a Legend (Villeneuve : l'ascension d'une légende).

He is a regular collaborator with Lapointe, and has produced albums for Émile Bilodeau, Koriass, Patrice Michaud, Laurence Nerbonne, Ariane Moffatt and Safia Nolin.
