= Michel Rivard =

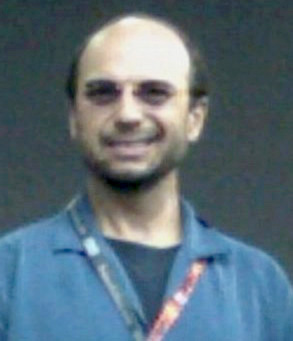
- Self-portrait of Michel Rivard at Parc Lafontaine in Montreal

Background information
- Born: Michel Rivard; September 27, 1951 (age 74); Montreal, Quebec, Canada
- Origin: Montreal, Quebec, Canada
- Genres: Folk rock
- Occupations: Singer-songwriter, guitarist
- Instruments: Vocals, guitar
- Years active: 1974–present
- Formerly of: Beau Dommage

Michel Rivard (French pronunciation: [miʃɛl ʁivaʁ]; born September 27, 1951) is a singer-songwriter and musician from Quebec, born in Montreal. His father, Robert Rivard, was an actor. Michel began his career at an early age appearing in a Canadian television series (Rue des Pignons) and in TV commercials.

Rivard's career as a writer and composer began in earnest when he became a member of the theatrical group Quenouille Bleue, established in 1970. Later, he became a member of Théâtre Sainfoin, when it was founded in 1973.

== Beau Dommage and beyond ==
In 1974, Rivard and other members of Théâtre Sainfoin, formed the group Beau Dommage (an old Québécois expression meaning "certainly" or "damn right"). Rivard wrote and composed for Beau Dommage.

Beau Dommage became a very popular group, and as a result of his songwriting ability Rivard's popularity increased as well. Perhaps his most popular song from this era is "La complainte du phoque en Alaska". Although Beau Dommage disbanded in 1978, there were reunion concerts in 1984 and 1994, both of which Rivard participated in. Characteristic of Rivard's creative energy, he also put out his first solo album in 1977, Méfiez-vous du grand amour.

In 1978, as a sign of his increased prestige, Michel opened for Maxime Le Forestier and was an accompanist for Forestier at the Olympia in Paris. Although an unlikely pairing, it resulted in a continued friendship. Rivard released his second LP, De Longueuil à Berlin, in 1979; that year also marked the beginning of Rivard's appearance in a series of concerts in Paris.

== The 1980s ==
The following years saw Rivard involved in various collaborations, including film collaborations. These film collaborations included roles in Les Enfants de Kennedy, and Maria Chapdelaine. He also wrote scores for films, such as André Melançon's L'Espace d'un été, and Jean-Michel Ribes's Rien ne va plus. He also acted playing the lead Yves Simoneau's Pourquoi l'étrange Monsieur Zolock s'intéressait-il tant à la bande dessinée? (Why is the Strange Mr. Zolock so interested in Comic Strips?) (1982). He joined the LNI (Ligue nationale d'improvisation [National Improvisation League]) in 1980 and performed for several years. Not wanting to miss an opportunity for some political humour, Rivard was a candidate for the satirical Rhinoceros Party of Canada in 1980 when he ran against former Prime Minister Pierre Trudeau.

He returned to music in 1983 with the release of his third LP, Sauvage. This LP included "Schefferville, le dernier train", a tune that became quite popular and which was written for the film Le Dernier glacier. (Rivard also acted in this film). Rivard made a music video for another song on Sauvage: "Rumeurs sur la ville". It was directed by Louis Saia and André Gagnon and won the Félix Video Clip of the Year for 1985 – awarded at the ADISQ (Association du disque, de l'industrie du spectacle québécois et de la vidéo) award ceremonies.

During this time Rivard toured Quebec. He released a fourth LP, called Bonsoir... Mon nom est Michel Rivard et voici mon album double. This was a live recording made during his 1983 and 1984 concerts. These live show recordings display his adeptness at comic improvisation as well as his musical creativity.

In December 1988, Rivard played the Convocation Hall in Toronto. It was the first time in ten years that a Québécois sang in French there. Rivard continued to garner awards. In 1988, he won two more Félix awards "Concert of the Year" and "Male Singer of the Year." He also participated in concerts supporting political and humanitarian issues, among them: the Amnesty International concert "Human Rights Now!" along with Youssou N'Dour, Tracy Chapman, Bruce Springsteen, and others.

What was to become his most popular album, Un trou dans les nuages was issued in late 1987. It included songs that would be enduring hits for him: "Ma blonde et les poissons", "Libérer le trésor", "Je voudrais voir la mer", "Le privé", and "Un trou dans les nuages". Rivard received many awards for this album including the Charles-Cros Academie International Grand Prize.

Rivard released another album in 1989, Michel Rivard a compilation of greatest hits. He continued to perform concerts in Canada and Europe.

== The 1990s ==
Rivard's seventh album Le goût de l'eau…et autres chansons naïves came out in 1992. It too became another award-winning album for him and in 1993 Rivard performed at the Olympia theatre in Paris.

At this point in time Rivard's prominence as a creative musician and poetic lyricist with a broad humanitarian vision put him on a par with the two great performers of a previous Québécois generation, Gilles Vigneault and Félix Leclerc. Rivard's "Complainte du phoque en Alaska"' was one of the few songs recorded by Leclerc that Leclerc did not write himself. Rivard also shares with those two men, though more moderately, a concern and interest in Quebec's nationalist aspirations.

In 1998, Rivard released the haunting and personal Maudit Bonheur.

He had his own variety television show, Studio TV5, for a couple of years, where he invited musicians, songwriters, and singers that he enjoyed performing with and jammed with them.

== The 2000s ==
Rivard's concert career continues and he also continues to perform in theatre. In 2002, his album Simple (a live concert album) came out, and in 2004 Bonsoir…mon nom est toujours Michel Rivard et voici mon album quadruple came out.

On August 5, 2007, Rivard performed the last show at the Montreal Spectrum. He had been the only act to perform over one hundred concerts at the venue.

== Discography ==
- Méfiez-vous du grand amour (1977)
- De Longueuil à Berlin (1979)
- Sauvage (1983)
- Bonsoir... mon nom est Michel Rivard et voici mon album double (1985)
- Un trou dans les nuages (1987)
- Michel Rivard (1989)
- Le gout de l'eau (1992)
- Maudit bonheur (1998)
- Simple (2004)
- Bonsoir... mon nom est toujours Michel Rivard et voici mon album quadruple (2004)
- Confiance (2006)
- Roi de rien (2013)
- L'Origine de mes espèces (2019)

== Personal life ==
His daughter Adèle Trottier-Rivard is a singer who has been associated with the bands Plants and Animals and Bibi Club. His son is well known chef Antonin Mousseau-Rivard.
