= Joli chaos =

Greatest hits album by Daniel Bélanger
- Released: November 25, 2008
- Genre: Pop
- Label: Audiogram
- Producer: Various

Daniel Bélanger chronology
L'Échec du matériel (2007)	Joli chaos (2008)	Nous (2009)

Joli chaos is an album by Daniel Bélanger, released in 2008 on Audiogram. It was released as a double album, consisting of a greatest hits compilation on the first disc and ten previously unreleased rarities on the second.

== Track listing ==
=== Disc One ===
1. Sèche tes pleurs
2. La folie en quatre
3. Ensorcelée
4. Opium
5. Quand le jour se lève
6. Sortez-moi de moi
7. Cruel (Il fait froid, on gèle)
8. Les deux printemps
9. Imparfait
10. Je fais de moi un homme
11. Intouchable et immortel
12. Fous n'importe où
13. Dans un spoutnik
14. Dis tout sans rien dire
15. Rêver mieux
16. L'échec du matériel
17. La fin de l'homme
18. Amusements
19. Je suis mort

=== Disc Two ===
1. Jamais content
2. C'est la loi
3. En ce monde
4. Les criquets
5. Soleil gratuit
6. Étreintes
7. L'Aiguiseur de ciseaux
8. Imparfait (mix inédit)
9. Joli chaos
10. Le Dernier souffle

== Credits (CD 1) ==
Tracks 1, 2, 3, 4 and 5 from Les Insomniaques s'amusent
Tracks 6, 7, 8, 9 and 10 from Quatre saisons dans le désordre
Tracks 11, 12, 13, 14 and 15 from Rêver mieux
Tracks 16, 17, 18 and 19 from L'Échec du matériel
