= Motorized tricycle (disambiguation) =

Motorized tricycles are three-wheeled vehicles based on the same technology as bicycles or motorcycles, and powered by motorcycle or scooter engines or electric motors.

Motorized tricycle may also refer to:

- Auto rickshaw
  - Motorized tricycle (Philippines)
  - Electric rickshaw
- Electric trike
- Steam tricycle

== See also ==
- Tricycle (disambiguation)
- Trike (disambiguation)
