= Powertrain =

System that powers a motor vehicle

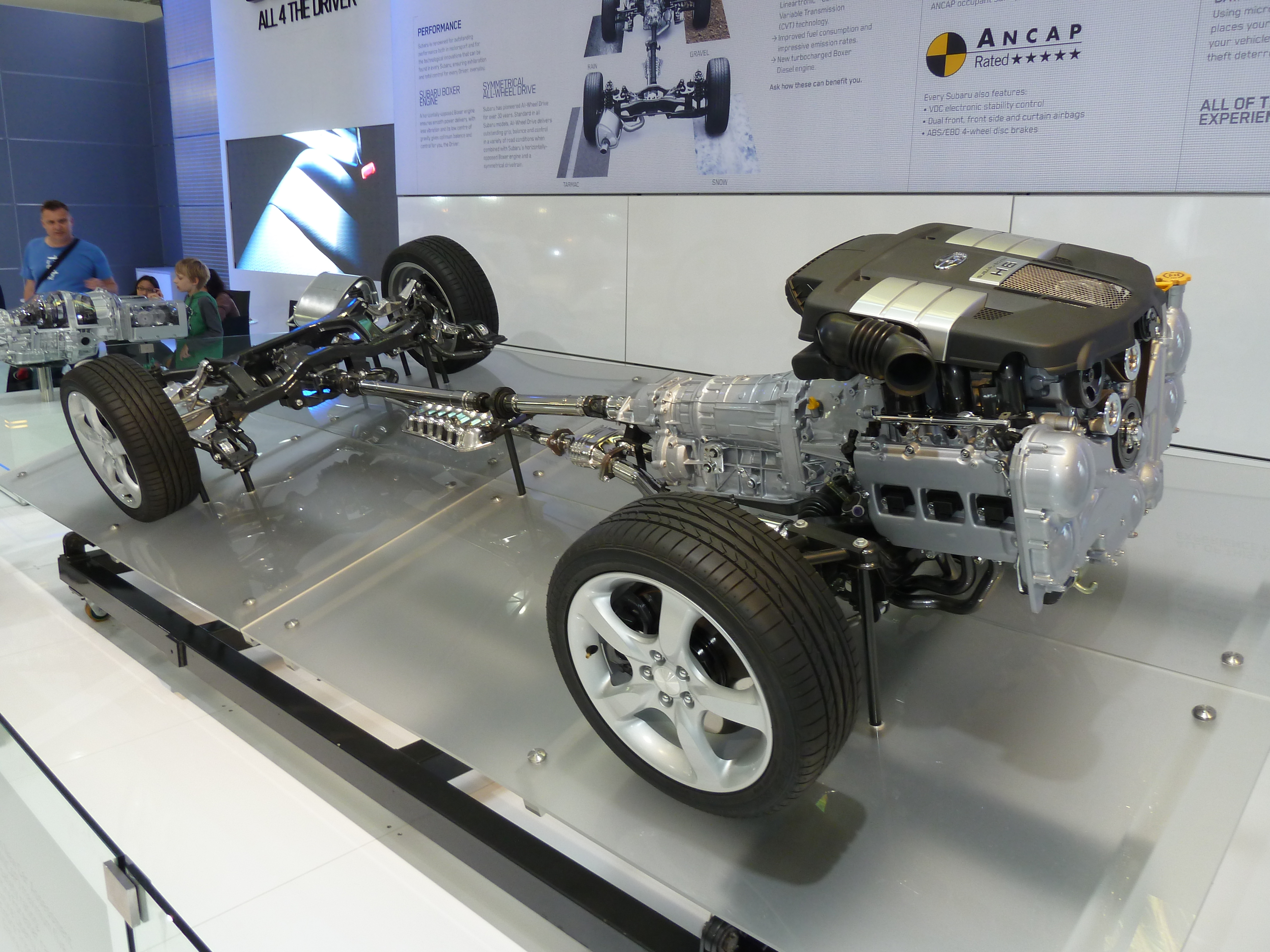
Powertrain of a modern automobile, comprising engine, torque converter or flywheel, transmission, drive shaft, suspension and the wheels. This specific powertrain features all-wheel drive.

In a motor vehicle, the powertrain comprises the main components that generate power and deliver that power to the road surface, rails, water, or air. This includes the engine, transmission, drive shafts, differentials, and the final drive (drive wheels, continuous track as in military tank or caterpillar tractors, propeller, etc.). Hybrid powertrains also include one or more electric traction motors that operate to drive the vehicle wheels. All-electric vehicles ("electric cars") eliminate the engine altogether, relying solely on electric motors for propulsion. Occasionally the term powerplant is casually used to refer to the engine or, less often, the entire powertrain.

A vehicle's driveline or drivetrain consists of the parts of the powertrain excluding the engine. It is the portion of a vehicle, after the prime mover, that changes depending on whether a road vehicle is front-wheel, rear-wheel, four-wheel drive, six-wheel or eight-wheel drive, or a locomotive or railcar is configured with an electric, hydraulic, hydrostatic or hydrokinetic transmission. The powertrain includes all the components used to transform stored (chemical, solar, nuclear, kinetic, potential, etc.) energy into kinetic energy for propulsion purposes

== Developments ==
The most recent developments involve electrification and battery improvement. In hybrid powertrains the torque generated by the combustion engine and the electric motor must be brought together and distributed to the wheels. This is a complex process but is critical for acceleration and lower emissions.

Powertrain development for diesel engines involves the following: exhaust gas recirculation (EGR), and advanced combustion. Spark ignition engine development include: fuel injection, including the gasoline direct injection variant, as well as improving volumetric efficiency by using multi-valves per cylinder, variable valve timing, variable length intake manifolds, and turbocharging. Changes also include new fuel qualities (no sulphur or aromates) to allow new combustion concepts. So-called "combined combustion systems" (CCV) or "diesotto" cycles are based on synthetic fuels (synthetic diesel, biomass to liquid (BTL) or gas to liquid (GTL)).

BEVs, FCEVs and PHEV powertrains are expected to reach cost parity with ICE powertrains in 2025.

== Key Components ==
The powertrain of a vehicle refers to the collection of components that generate power and deliver it to the wheels, enabling the vehicle to move. Powertrains can vary significantly between conventional internal combustion engine (ICE) vehicles, hybrid vehicles (HEVs), and electric vehicles (EVs). Regardless of the type, the powertrain remains one of the most critical systems in any vehicle.

* Engine: The engine is the heart of the powertrain in conventional ICE vehicles. It converts fuel, such as gasoline or diesel, into mechanical energy through the process of combustion. Engines come in various forms, including internal combustion engines, which are the most common, and electric motors, which are predominant in EVs. Hybrid vehicles often combine both systems to maximize fuel efficiency and reduce emissions. Each engine type has its unique design and operational characteristics, but all aim to produce the torque required to propel the vehicle.

* Electric Motor and Inverter: In electric vehicles, the electric motor replaces the traditional engine, converting electrical energy into mechanical energy to drive the wheels. This motor is highly efficient and eliminates the need for some of the more complex components found in ICE vehicles, such as exhaust systems or fuel tanks. Inverters are critical in EVs, as they control the motor's performance by regulating power output and enabling variable speeds. Together, the motor and inverter form the backbone of the electric powertrain.

* Transmission:The transmission is responsible for transferring mechanical energy from the engine or motor to the drivetrain. It ensures that the power generated by the engine is delivered to the wheels in the most efficient manner, adjusting for speed and load. There are several types of transmissions, including manual transmissions, where the driver shifts gears; automatic transmissions, which shift gears automatically; continuously variable transmissions (CVTs), which offer seamless acceleration; and dual-clutch transmissions (DCTs), known for their rapid gear changes and improved performance.

* Control Units:Modern powertrains are heavily dependent on electronic control units (ECUs) or powertrain control modules (PCMs). These systems monitor and optimize the performance of the engine, transmission, and other components. By analyzing data from sensors throughout the vehicle, ECUs ensure the powertrain operates at peak efficiency while also complying with emissions and performance standards. Control units are essential for advanced features like adaptive driving modes and predictive maintenance.

* Drivetrain:The drivetrain is the system that connects the transmission to the wheels, distributing power as needed. It includes key components such as the driveshaft, which transfers rotational power, the differential, which allows the wheels to rotate at different speeds for smoother cornering, and the axles, which deliver power directly to the wheels. The drivetrain configuration varies by vehicle type, with common setups being front-wheel drive (FWD), rear-wheel drive (RWD), and all-wheel drive (AWD) or four-wheel drive (4WD), each offering distinct advantages depending on the application.

== Manufacturing ==
The manufacturing of powertrain components and systems is important to industry, including the automotive and other vehicle sectors. Competitiveness drives companies to engineer and produce powertrain systems that over time are more economical to manufacture, higher in product quality and reliability, higher in performance, more fuel efficient, less polluting, and longer in life expectancy. In turn these requirements have led to designs involving higher internal pressures, greater instantaneous forces, and increased complexity of design and mechanical operation. The resulting designs in turn impose significantly more severe requirements on parts shape and dimension; and material surface flatness, waviness, roughness, and porosity. Quality control over these parameters is achieved through metrology technology applied to all of the steps in powertrain manufacturing processes.

== Frames and powertrains ==
In automotive manufacturing, the frame plus the "running gear" makes the chassis.

Later, a body (sometimes referred to as "coachwork"), which is usually not necessary for integrity of the structure, is built on the chassis to complete the vehicle. Commercial vehicle manufacturers may have "chassis only" and "cowl and chassis" versions that can be outfitted with specialized bodies. These include buses, motor homes, fire engines, ambulances, etc.

The frame plus the body makes a glider (a vehicle without a powertrain).

== Final drive ==
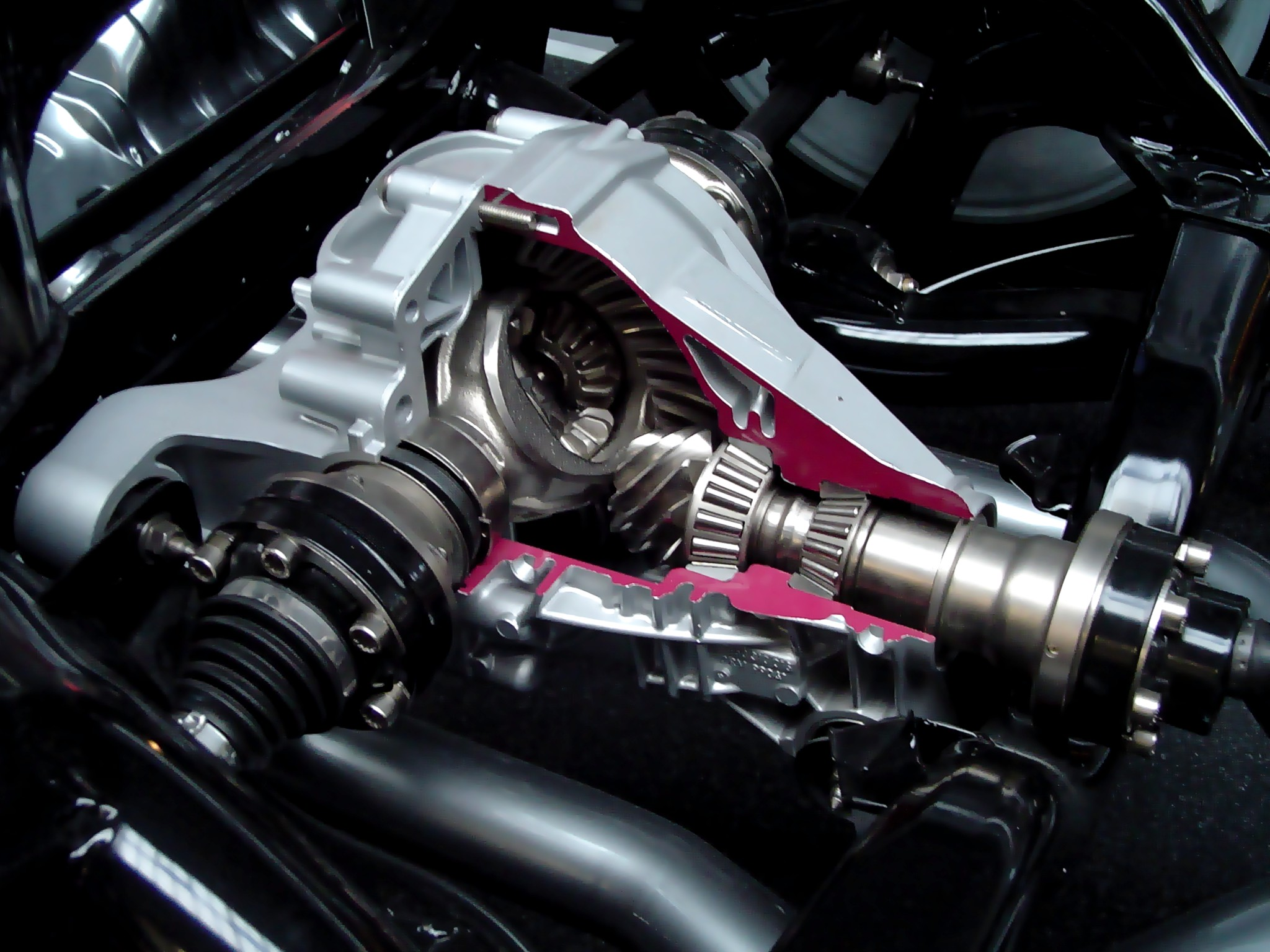
A cutaway view of an automotive final drive unit, which contains the differential

The final drive is the last in the set of components which delivers torque to the drive wheels. In a road vehicle, it incorporates the differential. In a railway vehicle, it sometimes incorporates the reversing gear. Examples include the Self-Changing Gears RF 28 (used in many first-generation diesel multiple units of British Railways) and RF 11 used in the British Rail Class 03 and British Rail Class 04 diesel shunting locomotives.

== Variations ==
This section uses infographics to show a unified model with variations, the green wheels denote no traction, and the angled wheels denote steering.

6X4 means 6 wheel ends and 4 positions distribute power (power divider installed)

6X2 means 6 wheel ends and 2 positions distribute power (single axle drive)

4X0 means 4 wheel ends no power (Trailer axle)

4x2 means 4 Wheel ends, 2 Positions to distribute power

The 6 wheel ends can either be wide base singles or duals. Its about the outside of the wheels.

Code	Description	Use	Graphic
RWD	Rear Wheel Drive	Small Van	RWD powertrain show drive to the rear wheels only
4WD	Four Wheel Drive AKA 4x4	Pick Up Truck	4WD powertrain shows drive to all wheels
FWD	Front Wheel Drive	Van, Where Weight is desired over front wheels	power going to the front wheels only
DWD	Dual Wheel Drive (Dually)	Extra load Capacity is required to a 4WD	power to Dual Rear Wheel
6X4	A 6×4 or six-by-four is a vehicle with three axles, with a drivetrain delivering power to two wheel ends on two of them. It is a form of four-wheel drive but not one of all-wheel drive.	Classic Truck	twin rear axles providing drive via 8 wheels
6x6	6X6, a standard class of medium-duty trucks	Classic Mil spec	6x6 drive train power to rear and front
6X2 - Rear Lift	In its purest form, a 6x2 chassis configuration is a three-axle tractor with power going to just one of the tandem rear axles. Put another way, only two of the six wheel positions are powered.	Where Trucks need a shorter turn radius and at times don't need the extra axle to improve fuel consumption (the rear wheels can be lifted off the ground when not needed)	6x2 power to the middle wheels
6x2 Mid Lift	three-axle tractor with power going to just one of the tandem rear axles.	The middle axle is able to be lifted, typical use is where max weight is given to cargo (such as fuel tankers), sometimes the middle axle as smaller wheels and tyres	mid lift showing the middle can be lifted off the ground
8X4	8X4 means that the Truck has four axles, two of which are driving axles.	Typical use is a Tipper Truck, which has on and off-road requirements.	graphic showing power to all wheels
8X8	Eight-wheel drive, often notated as 8WD or 8×8, is a drivetrain configuration that allows all eight wheels of an eight-wheeled vehicle to be drive wheels (that is, to receive power from the engine) simultaneously.	Military or extremely high-load and off-road capability is required.	graphic showing power going to all eight wheels
6x6	Six-wheel drive (6WD or 6×6) is an all-wheel drive drivetrain configuration of three axles with at least two wheels on each axle capable of being driven simultaneously by the vehicle's engine.	Typical Small to medium Mining Truck or Military use.	six wheel drive
Half-Track	A half-track is a civilian or military vehicle with regular wheels at the front for steering and continuous tracks at the back to propel the vehicle and carry most of the load. The purpose of this combination is to produce a vehicle with the cross-country capabilities of a tank and the handling of a wheeled vehicle.	Typical WW2 era not main streamed produced today.	a half track combination
Tracked	Continuous track or tracked treads are a system of vehicle propulsion used in tracked vehicles, running on a continuous band of treads or track plates driven by two or more wheels. The large surface area of the tracks distributes the weight of the vehicle better than steel or rubber tyres on an equivalent vehicle, enabling continuous tracked vehicles to traverse soft ground with less likelihood of becoming stuck due to sinking.	Tractors, Tanks, Excavators, and Dozers.	tracked vehicle
Electric	An electric vehicle (EV) is a vehicle that uses one or more electric motors for propulsion. It can be powered by a collector system, with electricity from extravehicular sources, or it can be powered autonomously by a battery (sometimes charged by solar panels, or by converting fuel to electricity using fuel cells or a generator). EVs include but are not limited to road and rail vehicles, and broadly can also include electric boat and underwater vessels (submersibles, and technically also diesel- and turbo-electric submarines), electric aircraft and electric spacecraft.	In this power train the EV is powered by a large onboard engine, and has the typical application of very heavy-duty mining truck.	engine, alternator, twin motors and power to rear wheels

== See also ==
- Car safety
- Electric vehicle
- Electric vehicle conversion
- Giubo
- Gear train
- Hybrid vehicle drivetrain
- Three-wheeled vehicles
