= E-scooter =

Electric-powered stand-up scooter

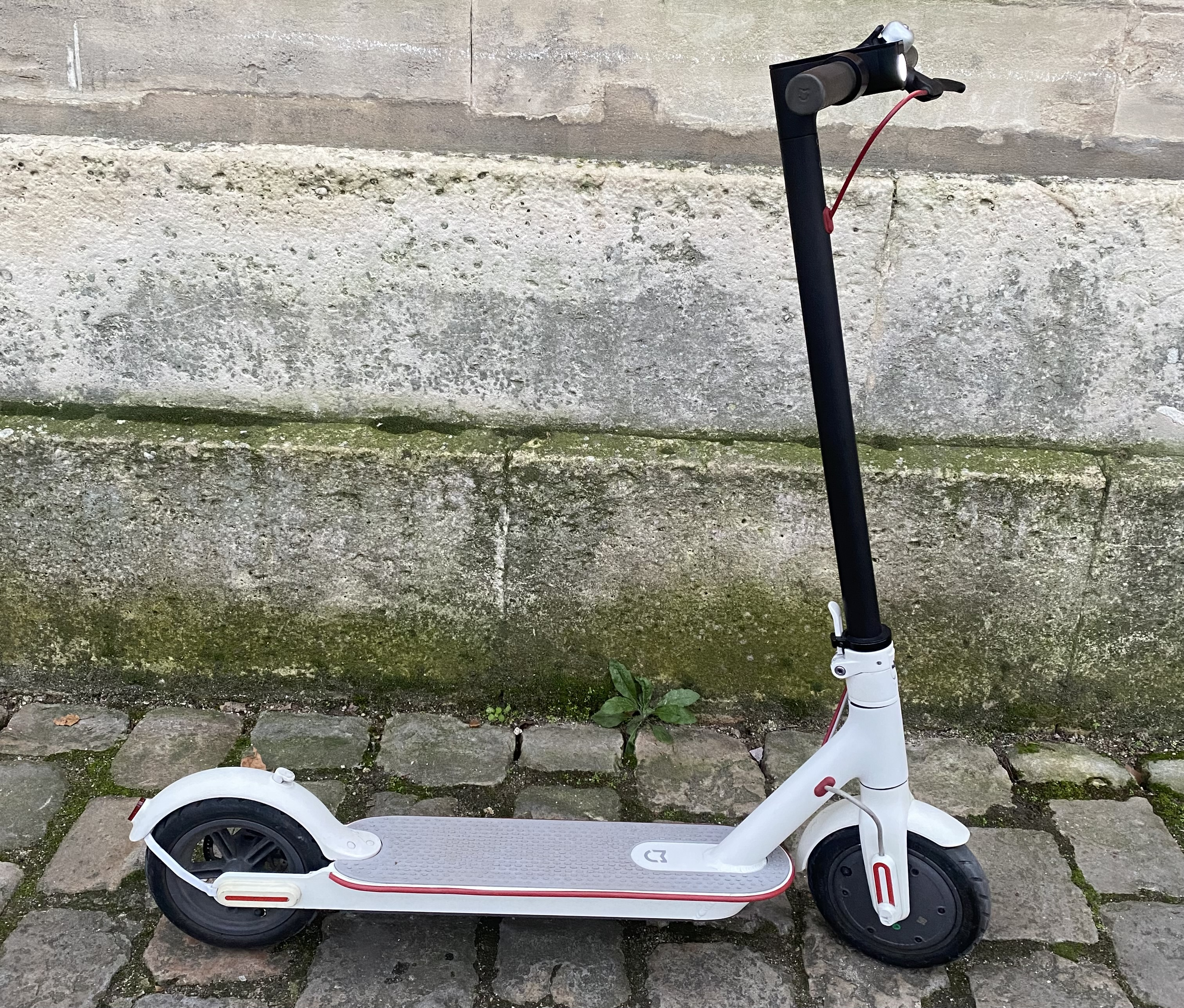
White Xiaomi M365

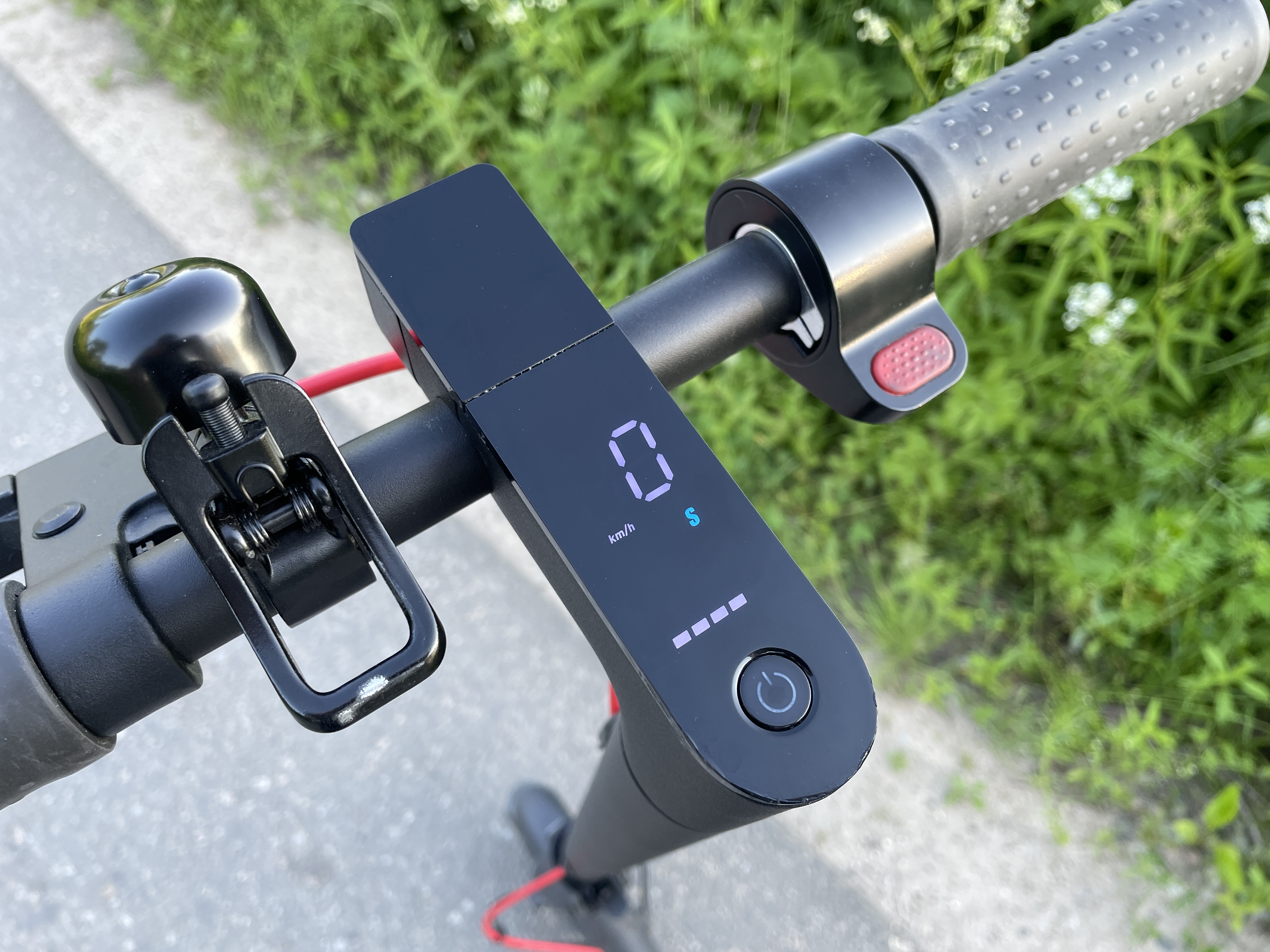
Dashboard

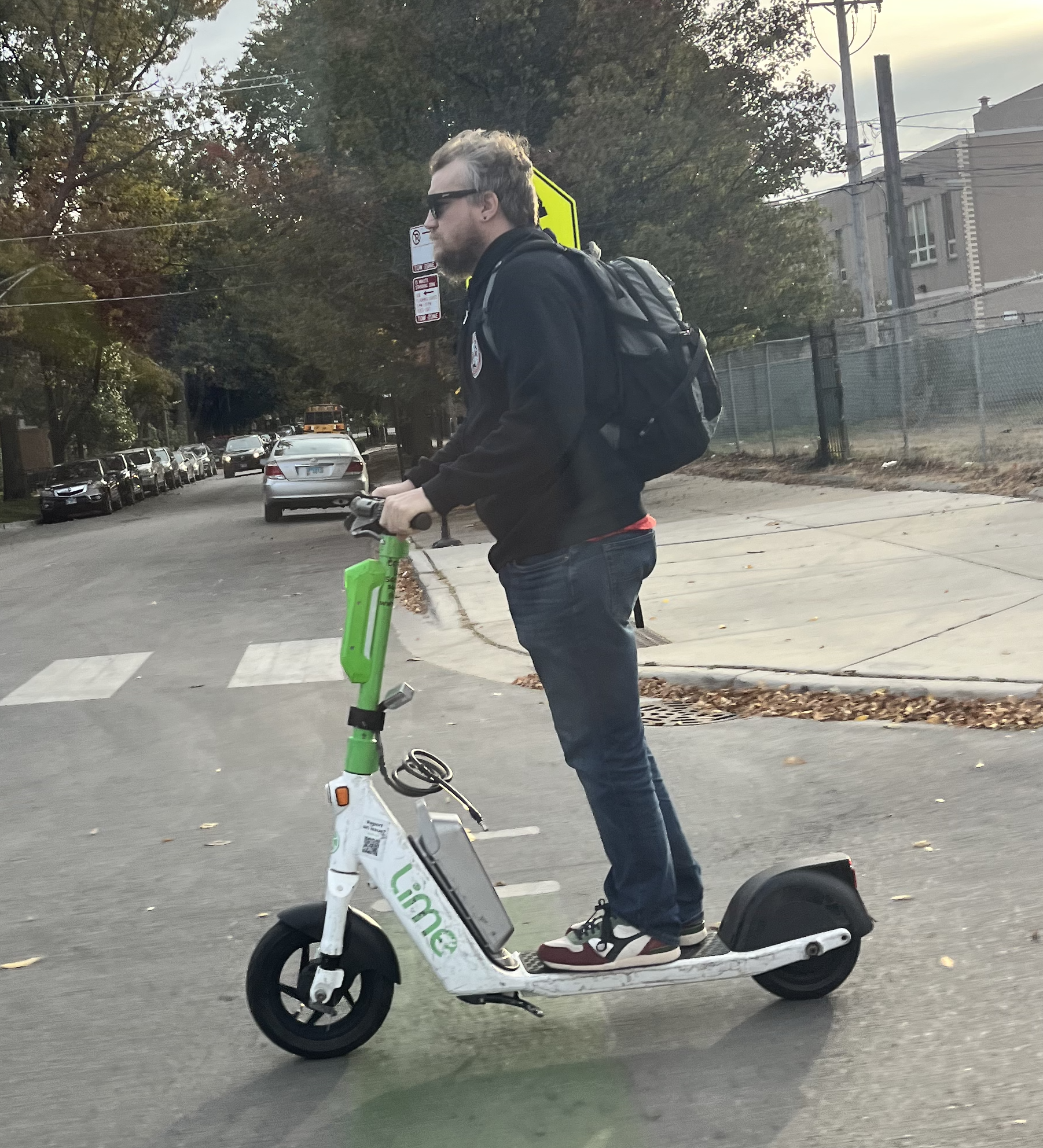
A man riding an electric kick scooter

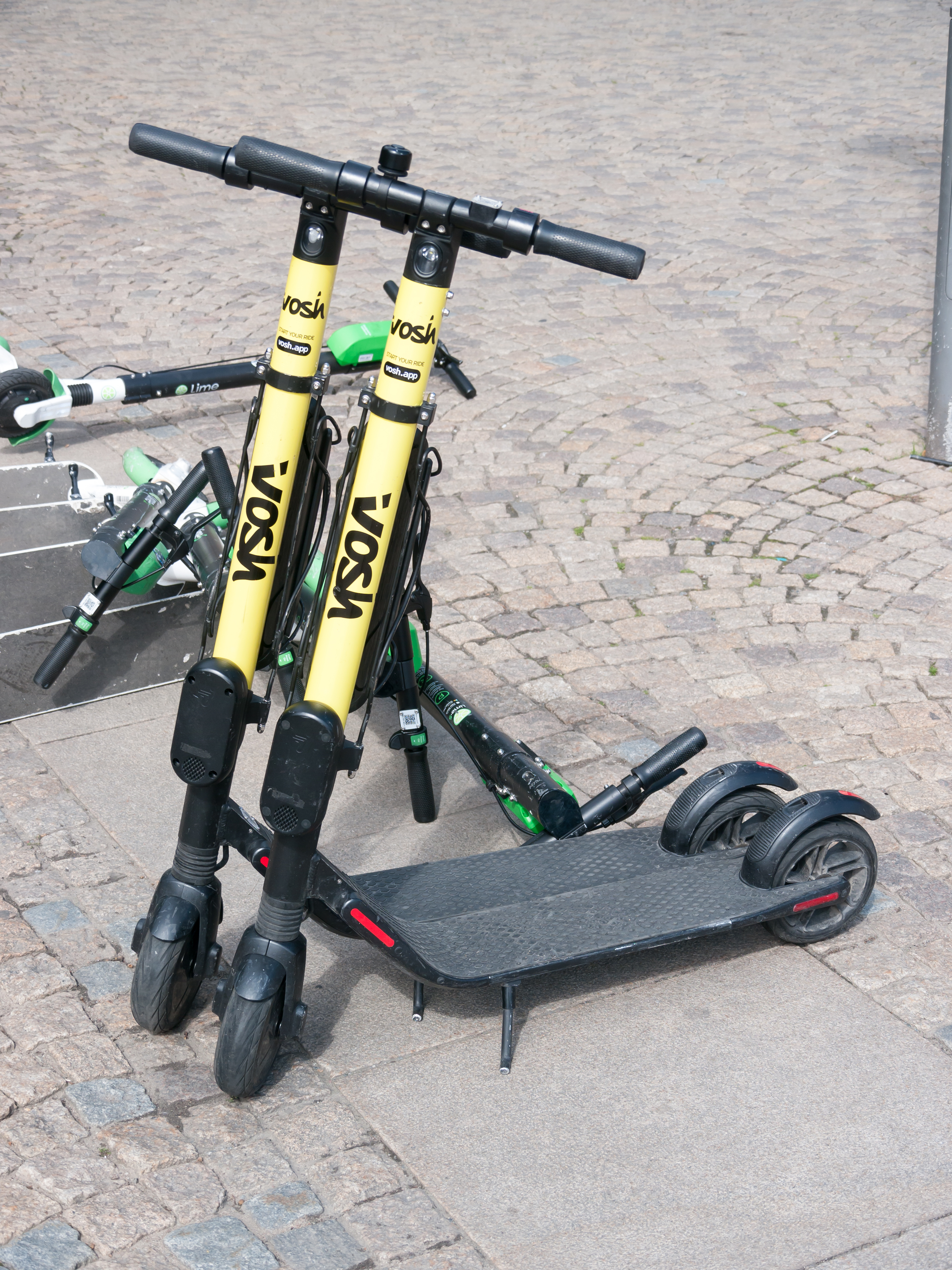
Scooters of several operators in Stockholm

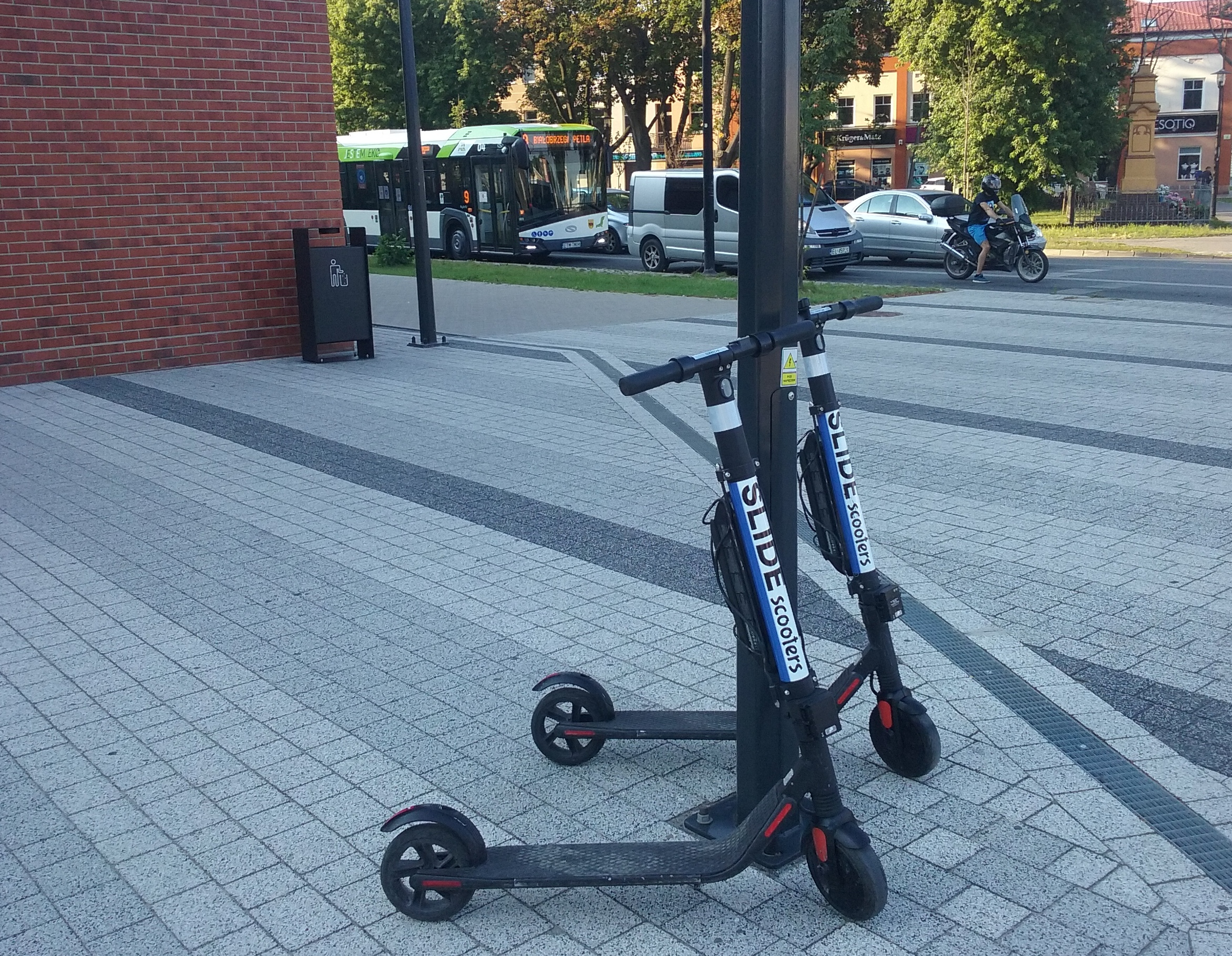
City scooters in Tomaszów Mazowiecki, Poland

An e-scooter or electric kick scooter is a type of motorized scooter – a stand-up scooter powered by an electric hub motor in its front and/or rear wheel. It is generally designed with a large center deck on which the rider stands. A motorized scooter may also be powered by a small internal combustion engine. They are generally classified as a micromobility vehicle.

The first motorized scooter was manufactured by Autoped in 1915. Since 2017, e-scooters have grown in popularity with the introduction of scooter-sharing systems that use apps to allow users to rent them by the minute. Such systems now are in selected major and midsize cities worldwide.

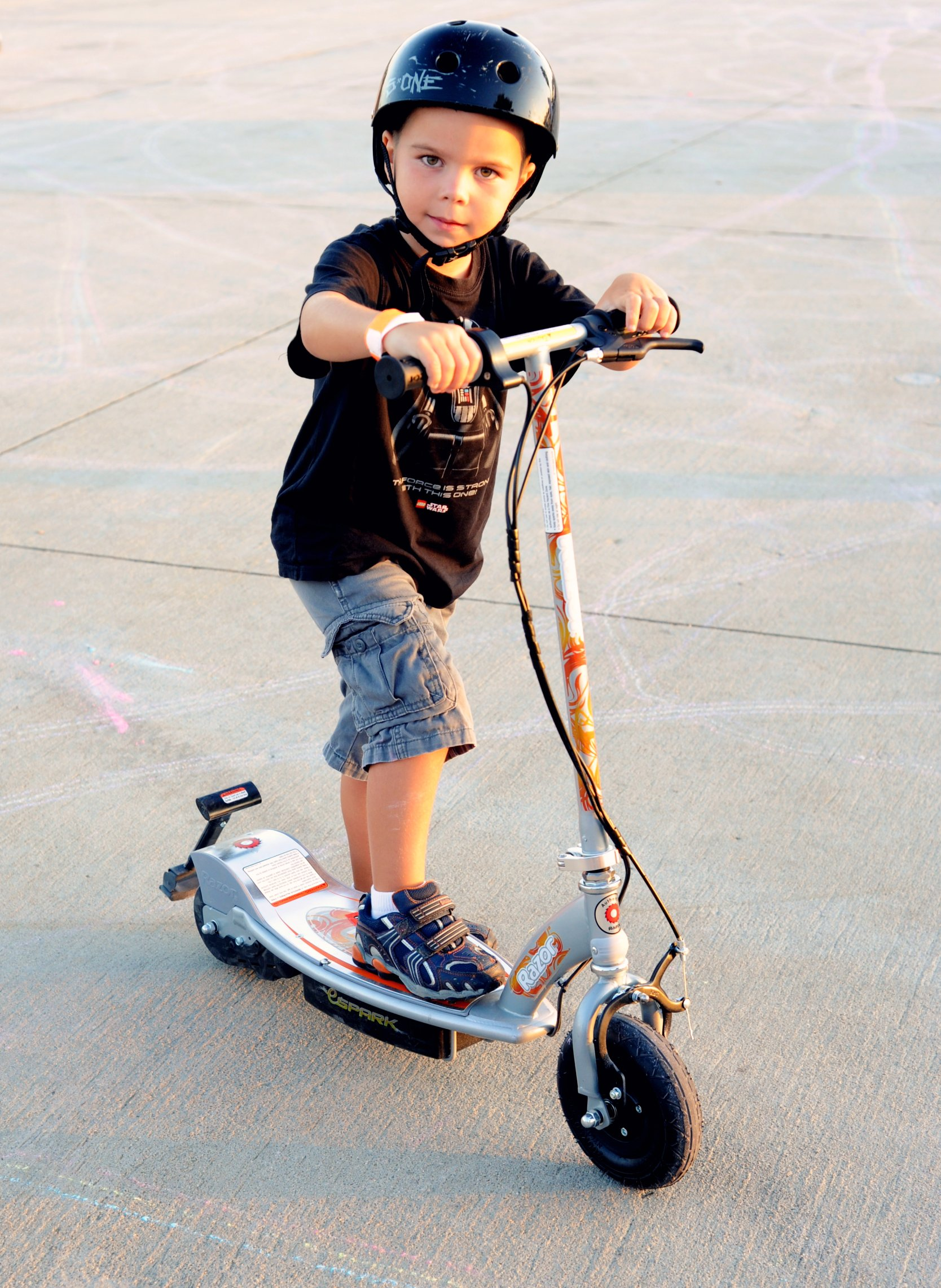
A child on a smaller e-scooter, 2011

== Parts and other features ==
Parts of an electric scooter include the deck, stem, handlebars, tires, suspension, lights, batteries, brakes, controller and motor.

E-scooters usually have two wheels between 8 and 11 inches (20–28 cm) in diameter, connected by a platform on which the rider stands, with a handlebar for support and steering.

There are three types of tires:

- Pneumatic (air-filled) tires.
- Solid tires.
- Hollow tires are made of durable rubber.

It is propelled by an electric motor, which makes gears unnecessary. It may support energy recovery by regenerative braking.

Range and speed vary considerably according to model. One reference shows ranges of 9 to 200 km (6 to 124 mi), and maximum speeds from 14 to 160 km/h (9 to 99 mph).

=== Wheels and tires ===
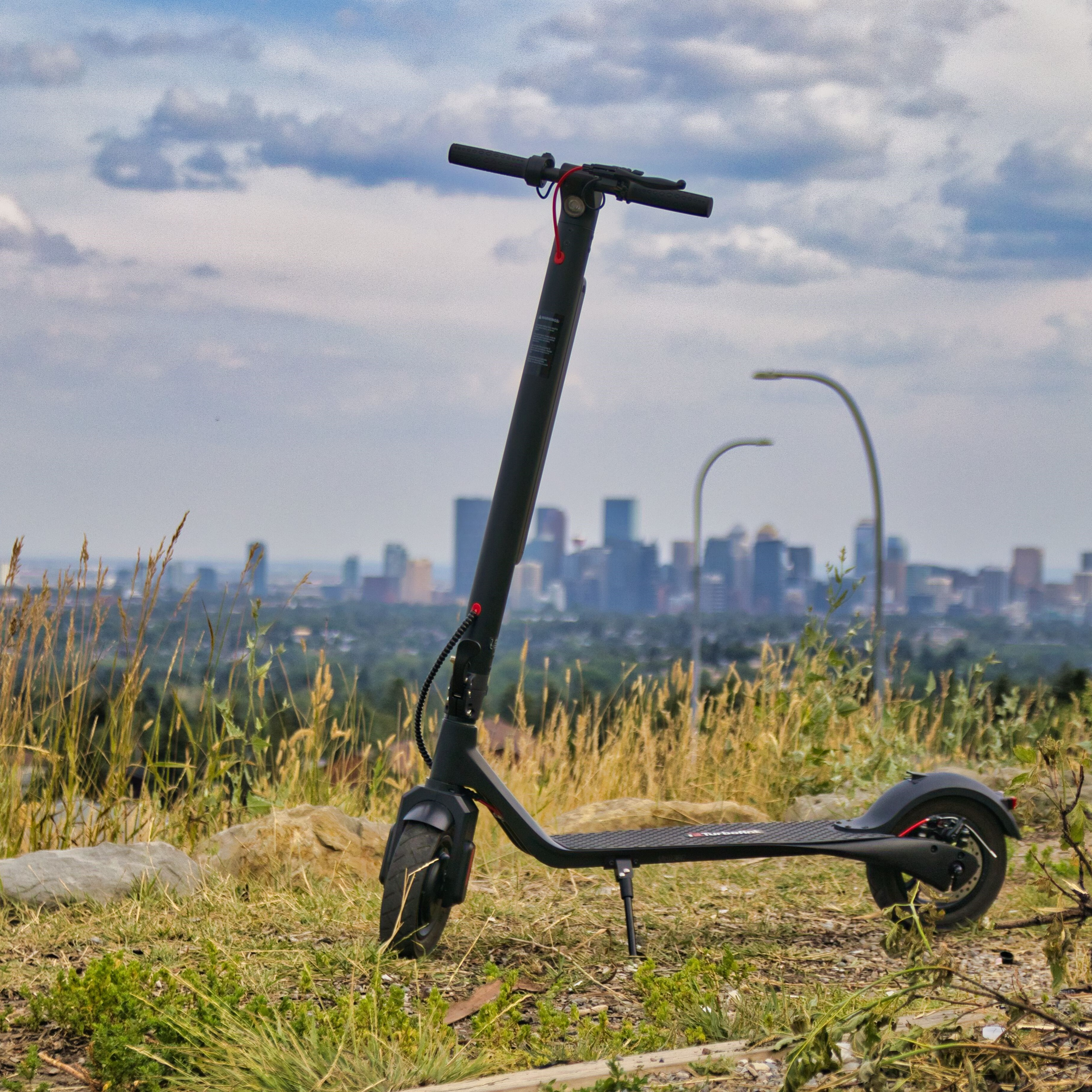
TurboAnt e-scooter with Pneumatic Tires

Stand-up scooters may have solid tires, pneumatic tires with tubes, or tubeless pneumatic tires. Pneumatic tires offer benefits such as better shock absorption, adjustable tire pressure, and easier changes; however, they are prone to flats and require regular maintenance, making them ideal primarily for flat surfaces. Solid tires, often honeycomb in structure, have advantages such as a longer lifespan, puncture resistance, and low maintenance needs. However, they tend to have heavier weight and less shock absorption compared to air-filled tires. Sizes vary between 8 inches (200 mm) and 11 inches (280 mm) usually, and scooters with larger are available, for both road and off-road use. There are some with unusually wide tires especially for off-road use. Most of them use a steel or aluminum split rim.

=== Drive and transmissions ===
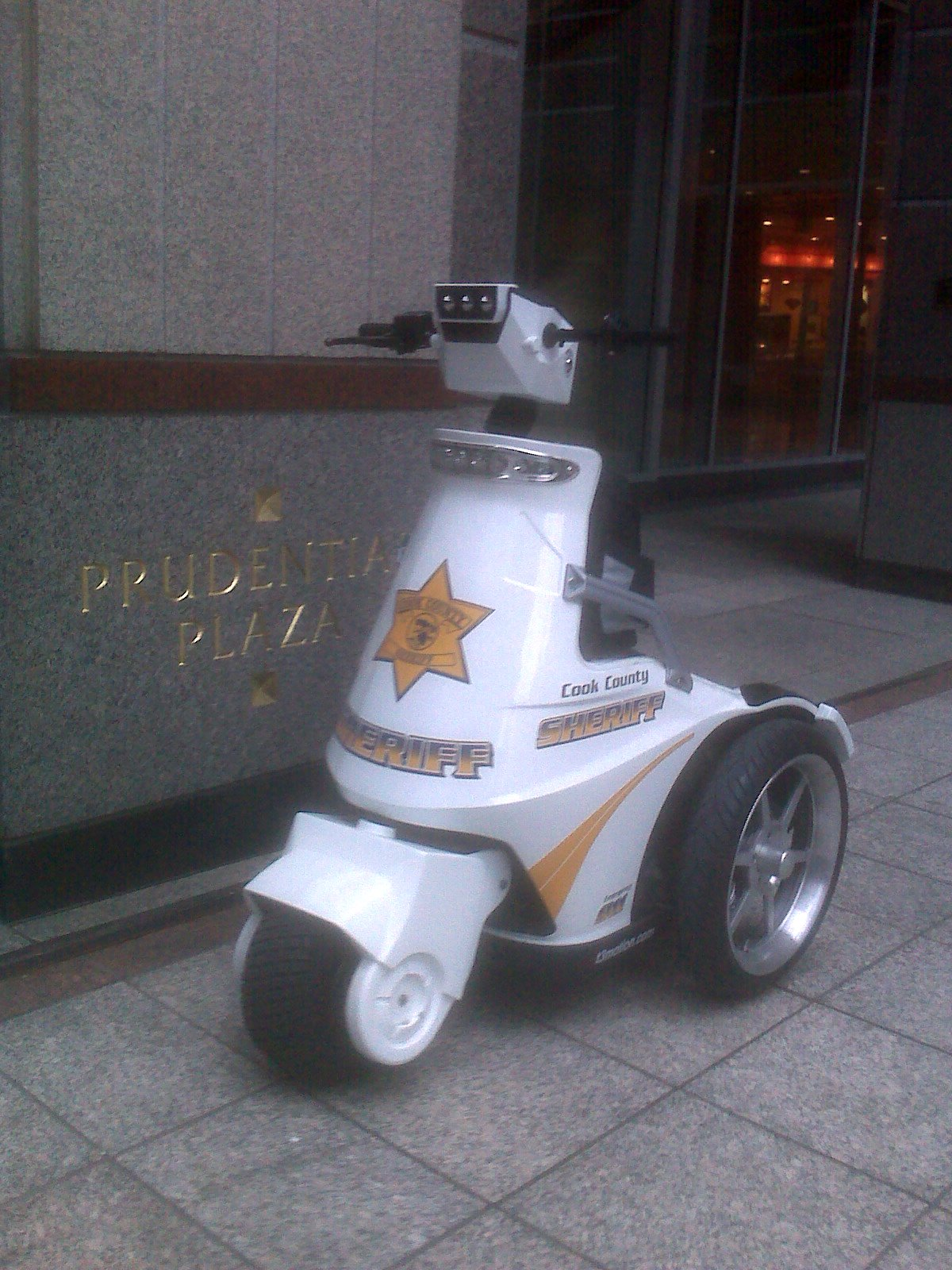
T3 Patroller electric stand-up tricycle

The simplest drive mechanism of stand-up scooters is the electric direct drive, where the motor directly drives the rear wheel. Some electric scooters have four motors, two in each wheel. Brushless motors can be extremely efficient this way, especially when regenerative braking is implemented. A large proportion of newer so-called "e-scooters" are designed this way.

When electric direct drive is not the rule, the simplest is the spindle drive, which puts an extension of the engine's output shaft, the spindle, in direct contact with the scooter's rear tire. To work correctly, the tire must have a clean, dry surface with which the spindle can effectively interact. Scooters with this type of direct transmission can be pull-started with the rear wheel off the ground, or "bump"-started by forcefully pushing them with the rear tire in contact with the ground.

Simple chain reduction drives are also used to transfer energy to the rear wheel, generally incorporating a type of centrifugal clutch to allow the engine to idle independently.

Belt reduction drives use the combination of wide flat "cog" belts and pulleys to transfer power to the rear wheel. Like chain drives, belt drives include a centrifugal clutch, but are more susceptible to breakage in off-road conditions.

=== Suspension ===
The suspension systems of stand-up scooters range from nothing at all, to simplistic spring based fork systems, to the complicated, dampened cam-link and C.I.D.L.I (Cantilevered Independent Dynamic Linkless Indespension) suspension mechanisms or a hybrid combination of wooden deck, coil spring, air spring and dampers.

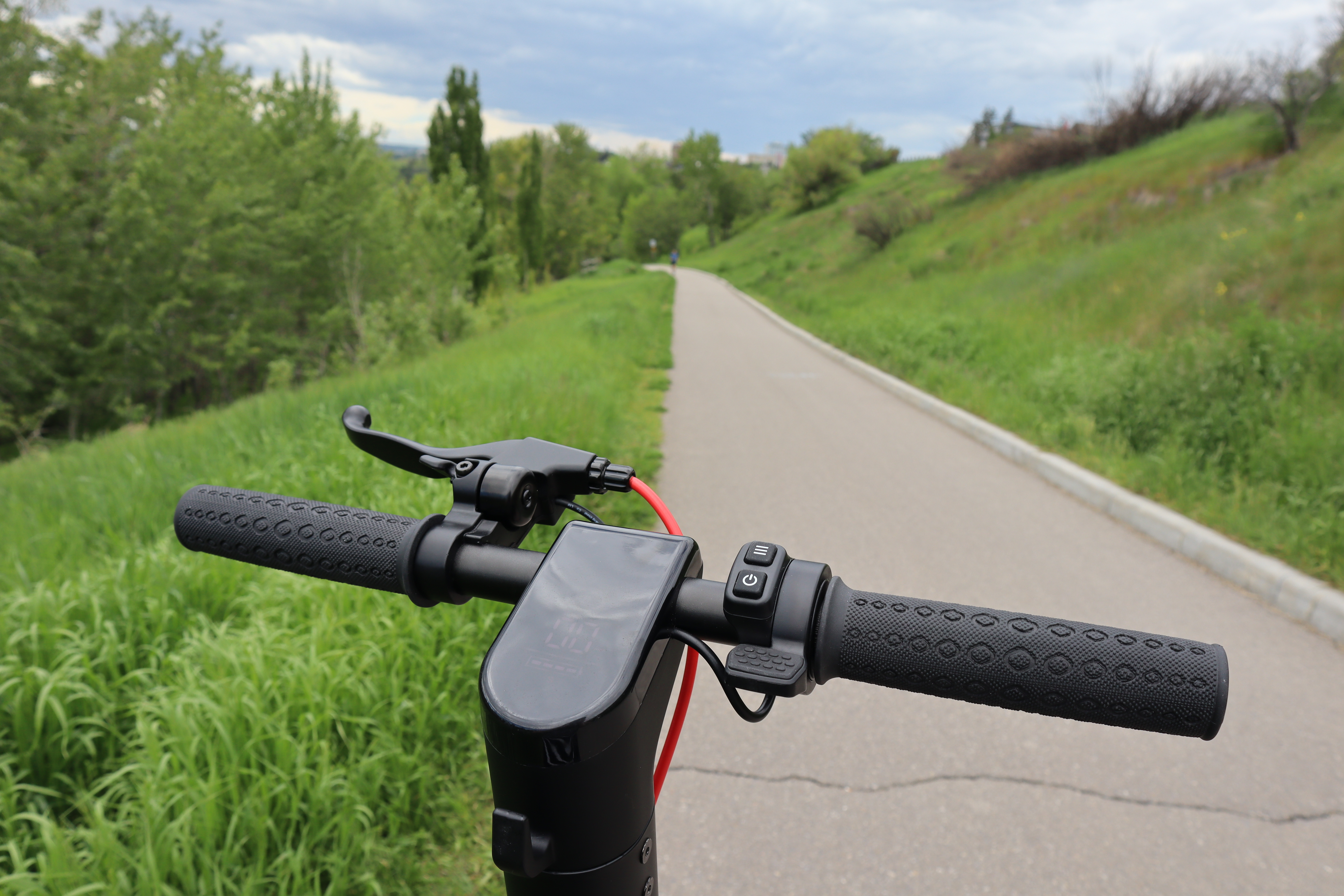
Front electronic brake

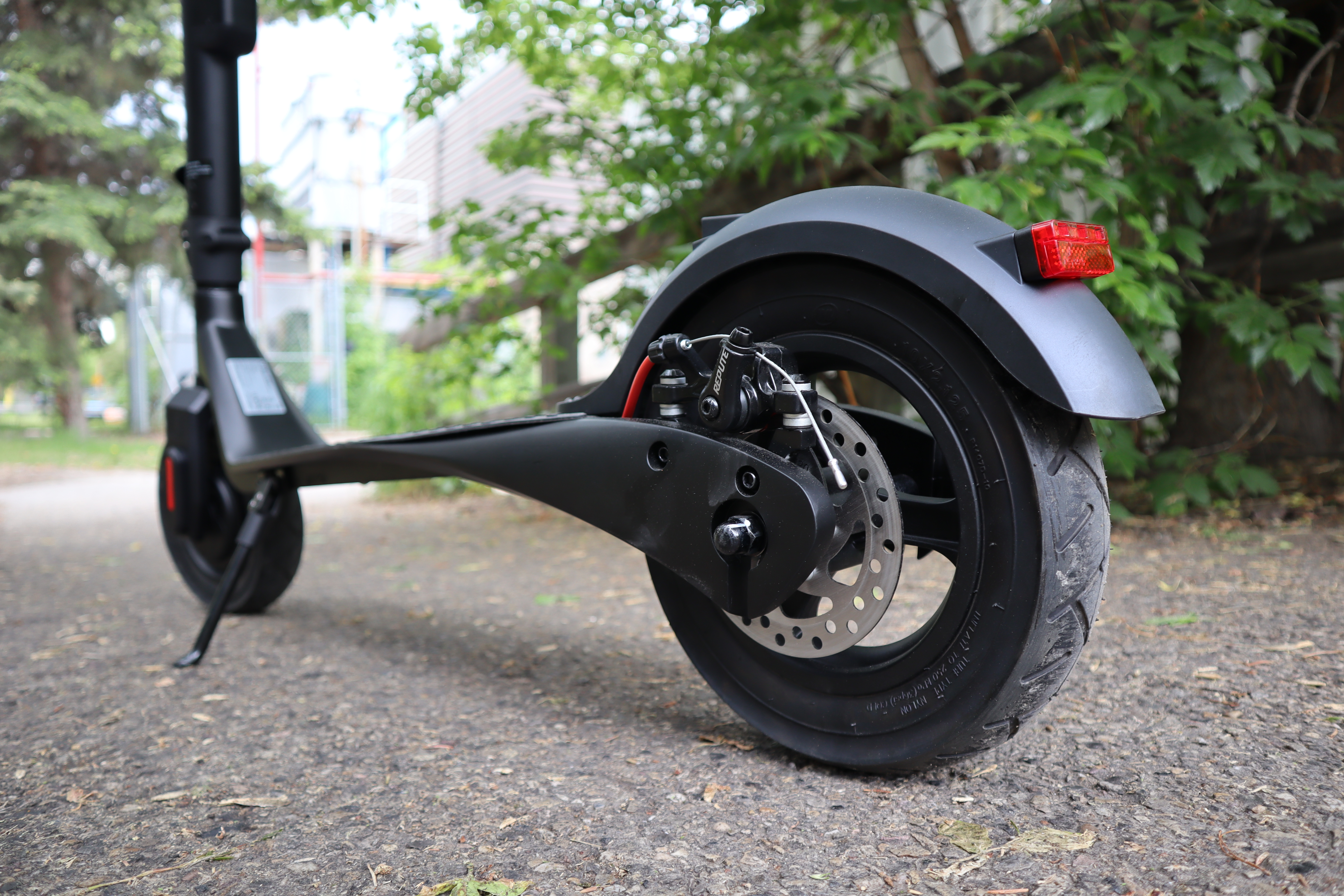
Pneumatic tire and Rear disc brake on the back wheel

=== Brakes ===
Brake systems of kick scooters include disc brakes; magnetic brakes; and less efficient hydraulic brakes. Brakes can be placed on the front and/or back wheel(s). Some scooters have two sets of brakes on each wheel, one on each side. Many newer e-scooter models also have kinetic energy recovery system (KERS), which also acts as an electronic ABS system (E-ABS) on some models.

== Scooter sharing ==
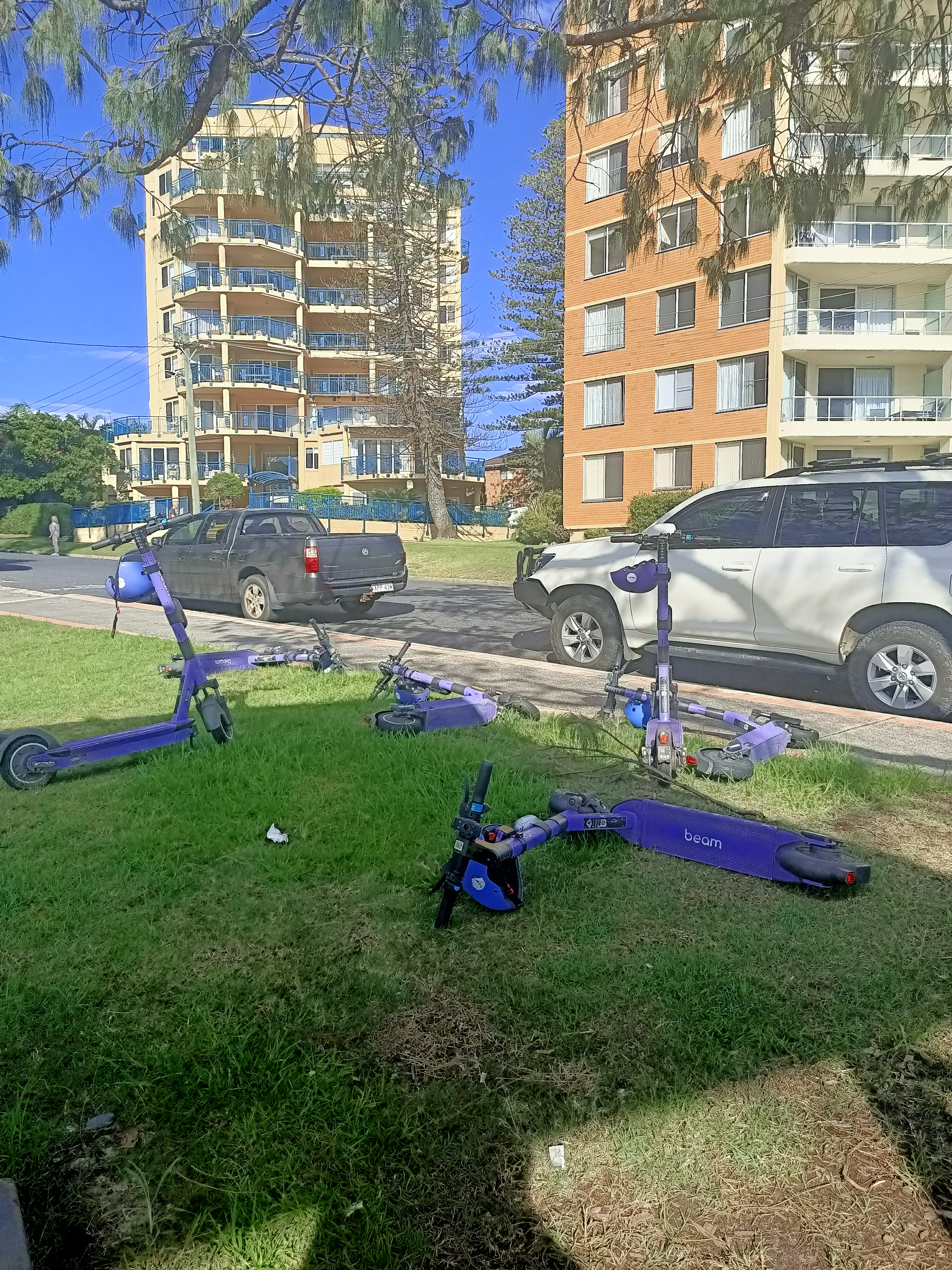
Beam Mobility shared e-scooters parked in Forster, New South Wales, Australia

In 2017, bicycle-sharing companies such as Lime, along with scooter-only companies such as Bird, began introducing dock-less electric kick scooter sharing services. This segment of the micro-mobility market made large inroads in 2018, with numerous dock-less e-scooters deployed across numerous cities worldwide.

Transport mode shift from car to shared e-scooter ranges from 8% in France to 50% in Santa Monica, United-States.

== Use ==
Motorized kick scooters are used in law enforcement, security patrolling and leisure. New ride-sharing systems have made e-scooters easily accessible. They are popular in urban areas and are used as an alternative to bicycling or walking. Ride sharing companies first started dropping these scooters off in large US cities in 2018, and the need for short distance easy access transportation in many cities has meant that they have become increasingly popular with more and more companies looking to join the market.

== Environment ==
E-scooters, and other electric vehicles, have the potential to reduce carbon dioxide (CO_{2}) emissions which are a cause of global warming, and other pollutants, if they are used to replace travel in vehicles with internal combustion engines. Potential environmental benefits depend upon how scooters are used: if they replace car journeys they may be beneficial, but not if they replace walked or cycled journeys. Manufacture of the batteries, in particular, requires resources, and they are often not recycled. Lime estimated that globally one in four trips on its scooters replaced a car journey. A December 2021 Swiss research paper found that privately owned e-scooters tended to replace car journeys, but rented e-scooters emitted more CO_{2} than the transport modes they replaced.

=== Safety ===
E-scooters are a potentially environmentally friendly alternative personal mode of transportation that has appeal in urban settings and for short distances. However, they are not exempt from the vulnerabilities users may encounter in road traffic injuries similar to exposures pedestrians and bicyclists have shared the roads. E-scooter use can also create conflicts with other road users, particularly pedestrians and cyclists. For example, research has found that restricting e-scooters to low speeds can encourage riders to use sidewalks, potentially reducing their exposure to motor vehicles while increasing conflicts with pedestrians. News reports have likewise highlighted the increasing number of serious injuries associated with e-scooter use and calls for stronger safety regulations. A 2022 review of medical notes found that injury rates due to e-scooters were more like those of motorcycles than bicycles.

In Europe, where e-scooters are usually limited to 20 and 25 km/h, in 2022, shared e-scooter casualties requiring medical treatment is estimated between 1.5 and 20.6 per million trips.

As availability and demand for e-scooters increases, with more powerful versions capable of reaching up to 50 miles per hour, the number of traffic accident cases has increased. Israel witnessed a six-fold increase of e-bike and e-scooter accidents over a span of three years, and China found a four-fold increase in injury rate and a six-fold increase in mortality rates. However, significant gaps remain in the knowledge about the safety measures and impact of e-scooters. A particular cause of accidents is the instability of vehicles with such small wheels when, for example, hitting a pothole.

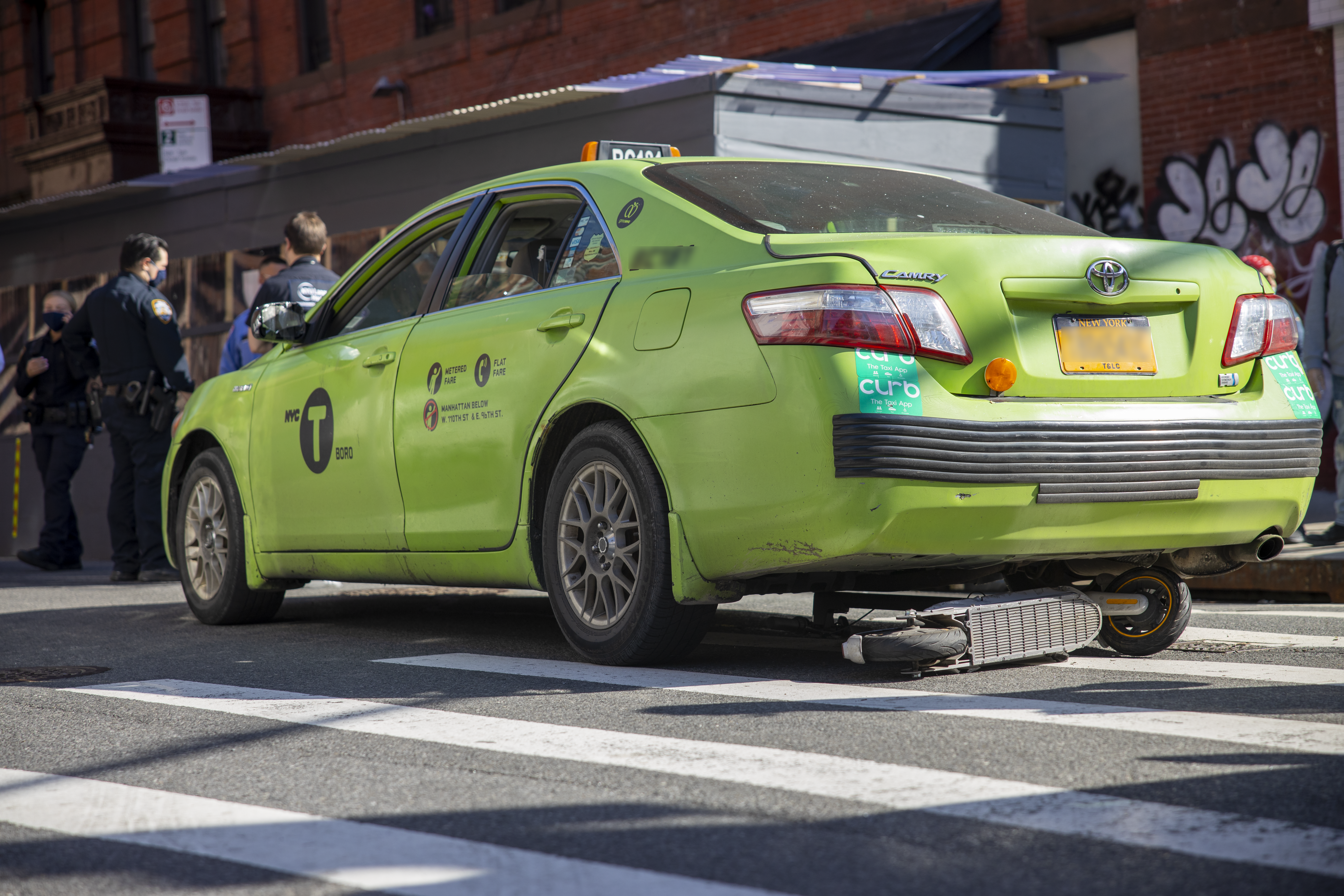
The site of a car–scooter collision in New York City

As e-scooters become more popular in urban and high traffic settings, user safety poses a major concern alongside other health risks for drivers, pedestrians, cyclists and other vulnerable groups such as the elderly and children sharing the road. A study conducted in China assessed risky behaviors of e-bike, e-scooter, and bicycle riders at crossing signalized intersections and found three different types of risky behaviors including stopping beyond the stop line, riding in motor lanes, and riding against traffic. A study of 2014-2020 UCLA-affiliated hospitals and outpatient center visits found that e-scooter injury rates in Greater Los Angeles area were similar to those of motorcycles, with about 33% of victims needing extensive follow-up care. However, the fatality rate was comparable to pedal bikes.

The same study found that those riding e-scooters are more likely to engage in risky behaviors. In specific, e-scooter riders were more likely to ride in motor lanes and ride against the flow of traffic through there is high variability in the types of accidents that occur and can vary based on time of day. Under-reporting poses as additional gaps in knowledge, as minor crashes, for example, tend to be under-reported and thus unaccounted for in overall e-scooter injury prevalence and there exist gaps in research on injuries related to e-scooters. Scooter-sharing systems such as Lime or Bird include safety precautions on the scooters themselves, such as: "helmet required, license required, no riding on sidewalks, no double riding, 18+ years old". Apps used to unlock and rent the scooters will also have safety reminders and ask the riders to abide by local laws while using them. However, these recommendations are not always followed, and the difference in laws between cities and states makes regulation difficult.

A consumer association in Belgium tested e-scooters, concluding that a bicycle was preferable, citing many problems with the devices, including in particular battery failure and very poor braking in wet conditions. E-scooters were regulated as toys, without the safety considerations required for vehicles.

When electric kick scooters were introduced in Norway, the media reported a high increase in accidents, including several deaths.

In Britain as of late 2021 privately owned e-scooters could not be used on public roads or footways; during a trial from mid-2020 until late 2022 rental scooters could be used on roads, but not footways, by users with an appropriate driving licence. At the time private scooters were widely used, illegally, on footways and roads. There were safety concerns—scooter accidents were causing injuries more like motorcycles than pedal cycles. Privately owned scooters were banned from carriage on London public transport after a spate of battery fires.

In Europe, before 2024, the majority of crashes did not involve another vehicle, while 80% of e-scooter rider deaths and 50% of trauma patients' injuries resulted from crashes involving a heavier motor vehicle.

A 2026 analysis of accidents in England and Wales found that e-scooter riders were three times more likely to suffer traumatic brain injuries than motorcyclists, with women at particular risk of serious harm. Over a third of adult e-scooter injuries were brain injuries, but riders also had more internal organ and blood vessel damage, but less bone fractures, than motorcycle or bicycle riders.

It has been suggested that the rate and severity of e-scooter accidents can be attributed to riders not having training and standing upright with a higher centre of gravity, and the scooters being inherently less stable than other two-wheelers, having sensitive steering and being vulnerable to sudden stops caused by small wheels striking kerbs, potholes or road debris.

== History ==
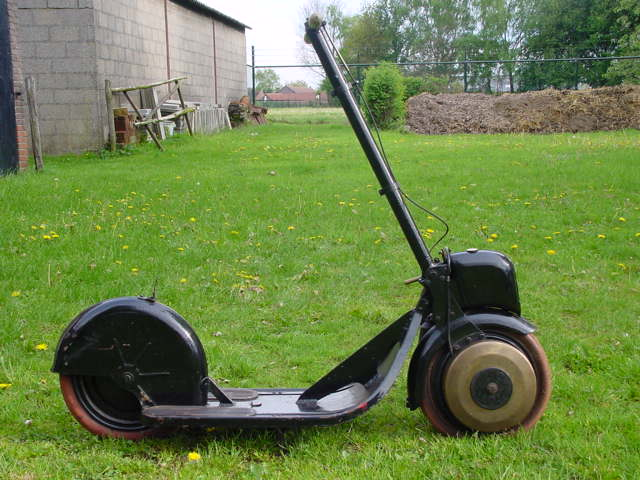
1919 Autoped Scooter

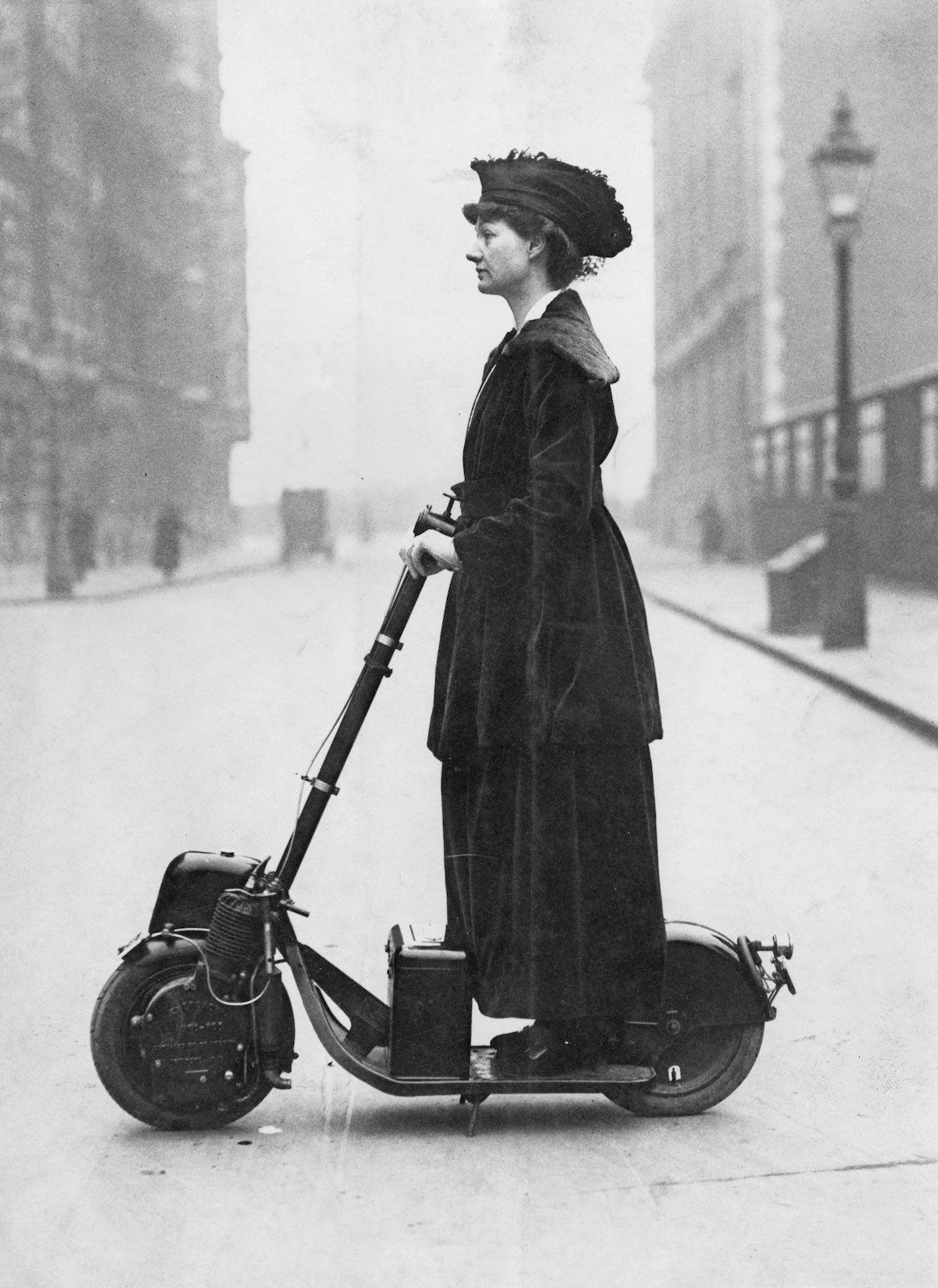
- Florence Norman on Autoped motor-scooter in 1916
  1915: Autoped introduces its stand-up scooter. Pulling back on the handlebar disengaged the clutch and applied the brake. Production continued until 1921; Krupp of Germany built the Autoped under license from 1919 to 1922.
- 1986: Go-Ped introduces the first modern stand-up scooters, the Roadster and Sport.
- May 2001: Go-Ped introduces the first full-suspension stand-up e-scooter, the Hoverboard.
- 2004: Evo Powerboards introduces the 2x, the first scooter with a two-speed transmission.
- November 2009: Go-Ped introduces the first gas-powered scooter and go-kart, the GSR Pro-Ped and GSR Pro-Quad.
- 2009: Italian-Israeli designer Nimrod Ricardo Sapir designs the world's first folding e-scooter based on his patent.
- 2010: Nimrod Ricardo Sapir starts producing the world's first motorized folding e-scooter utilizing lithium-ion batteries and a brushless hub motor under the MyWay brand in Avihayil, Israel, renamed Inokim in 2013 and later moving production to Ningbo, China.
- 2013: Light electric folding scooters powered by rechargeable lithium batteries and brushless hub motors become available from Micro Mobility Systems AG.
- 2018: Dockless scooter-sharing systems are rolled out in major cities, largely as expansions of bike-sharing systems.

== Gallery ==
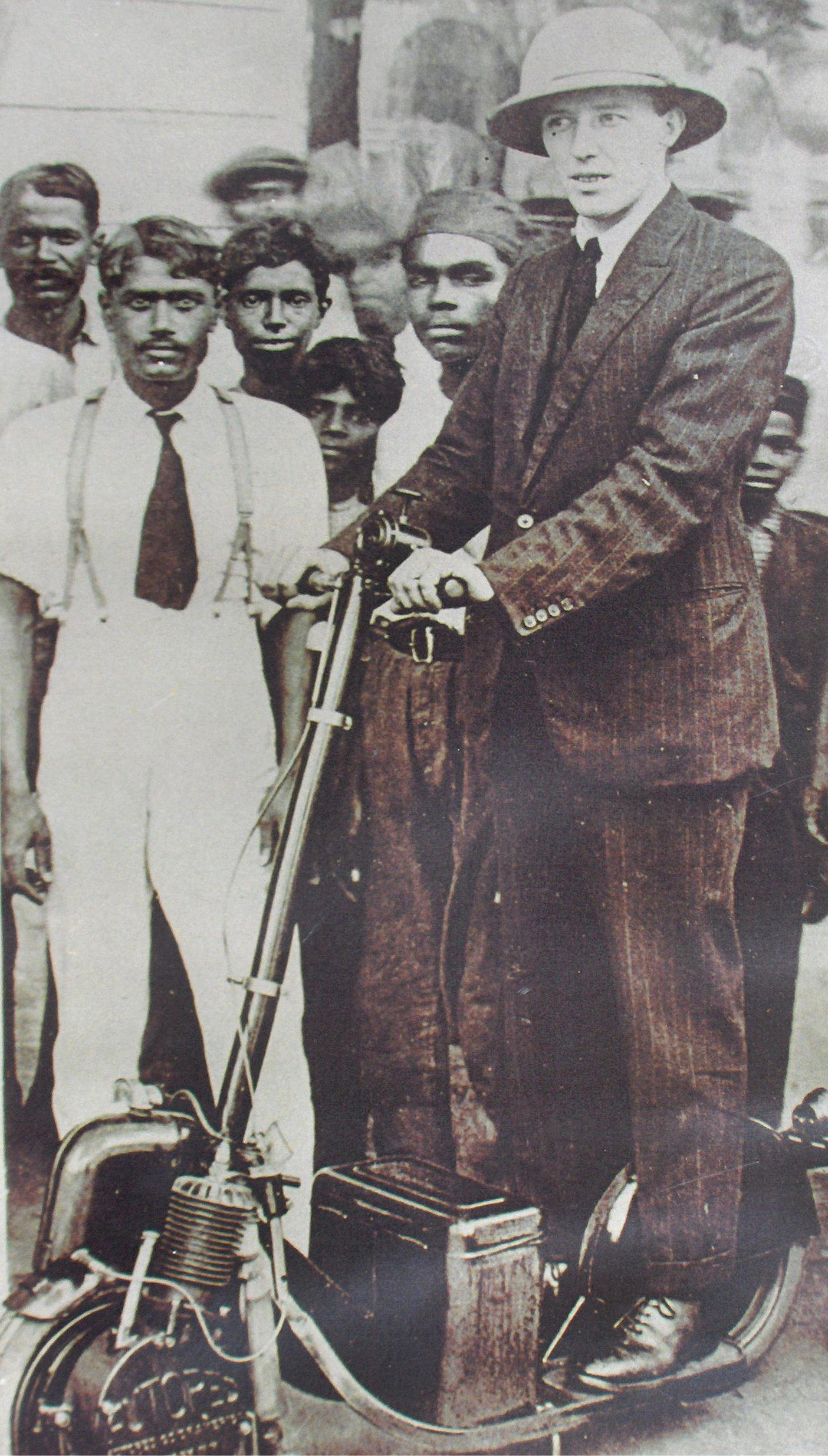
Man on a motorised scooter in the 1920s

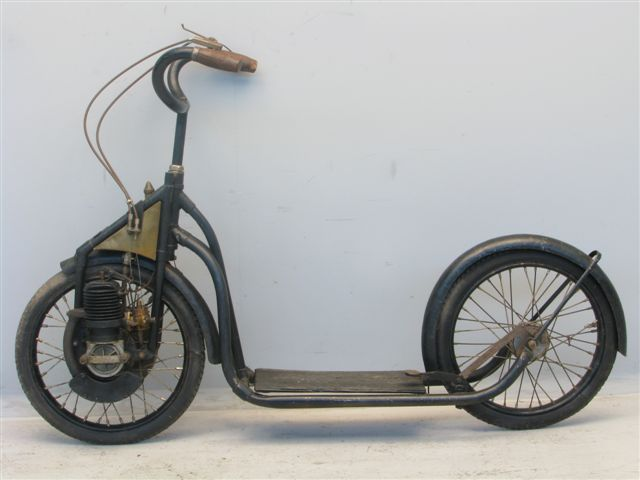
1922 Austro Motorette 82 cc two stroke

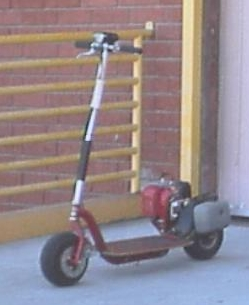
Example of a Go-Ped

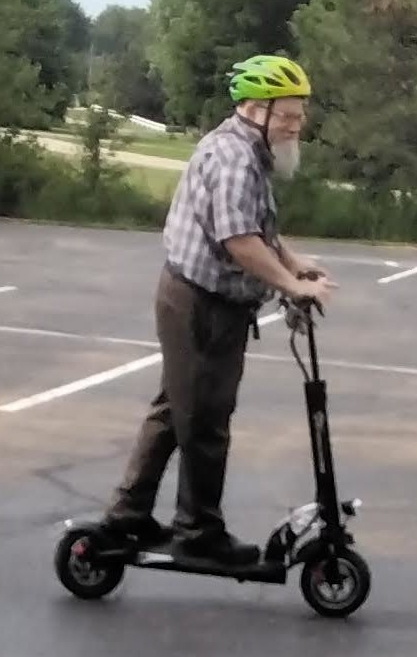
An Evercross H5 e-scooter being ridden

== See also ==
- Bicycle-sharing system
- Electric bicycle
- Electric rickshaw
- Electric trike, three wheeled electric kick scooter
- All-terrain vehicle (ATV) or Electric skateboard, four or more wheeled electric kick scooter
- Neighborhood electric vehicle
- Scooter-sharing system
- Segway PT
