= Autocycle =

Autocycle or auto-cycle may refer to:

- Motorized bicycle, a bicycle with an attached motor
- Moped, a type of small motorcycle
- A registration classification in the United States for some three wheeled vehicles, with a sit-in cockpit and steering wheel

== See also ==
- Trike (disambiguation)
