= Daniel Bélanger =

Canadian singer-songwriter (born 1961)

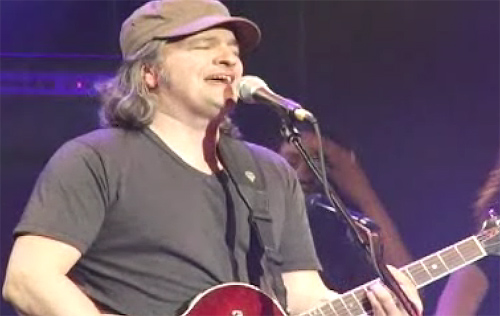
- Bélanger performing in 2007

Background information
- Born: 26 December 1961 (age 64); Montreal, Quebec
- Genre: Pop-rock
- Occupations: Musician; artist
- Instruments: Guitar; piano; melodica; saxophone; flute
- Years active: 1990–present
- Label: Audiogram
- Website: danielbelanger.com

Daniel Bélanger (born 26 December 1961) is a Canadian singer-songwriter. His music is eclectic, inspired by alternative rock, folk, and electronic music, sometimes humorous, sometimes wistful.

== Biography ==
In 1983, Bélanger founded the band Humphrey Salade with Norman Lachance, Eric Maier, and Jean Gauvin. Unfortunately, the timing was not right and the band never recorded.

His first solo album released in 1992, Les Insomniaques s'amusent has sold 175,000 copies and won the Félix for best pop-rock album in 1993. The first single released Opium was number one in Quebec for seven weeks and won the Félix for Videoclip of the Year. This first album also earned him the ADISQ awards for Bestselling Album of the Year, Male Performer of the Year, and Show of the Year in 1994.

In 1996, Quatre saisons dans le désordre was released. The album was a critical and popular success, winning the (Félix for the Pop-Rock Album, Singer-Songwriter, and Show of the Year, in the singer-songwriter category). The album was certified Platinum and titles like Les deux printemps, Sortez-moi de moi, and Les Temps fous (Félix for Videoclip of the Year) topped the charts.

1998: Daniel Bélanger toured as a solo artist honing his skills as a musical performer who enhanced his act with amusing stories and anecdotes; this led to the recording of an unusual album, Tricycle (1999), featuring excerpts from performances recorded at different points in his career.

2000: Daniel Bélanger released Erreur d'impression, a collection of 150 whimsical stories and reflections. He founded the publishing house Coronet liv. He continued to take part in major shows, including the opening concert of the 12th FrancoFolies de Montréal.

In October 2001, Bélanger released Rêver mieux. The album was an immediate success, winning (seven ADISQ awards in 2002, including Pop-Rock Album of the Year, and the following year, the ADISQ award for Videoclip of the Year for Dans un Spoutnik, the Juno Award for Francophone Album of the Year and was certified platinum.

Bélanger has also achieved critical acclaim for the music he has written for films. He was nominated for a Genie Award for Best Original Song for the movie theme Le Dernier souffle in 2000, and Jutra for Best Music for L'Audition in 2006).

L'Échec du matériel, released in April 2007, is an album just as poetic and melodious as Rêver mieux, but more rooted in the concerns and aspirations of his contemporaries.

Belanger won the 2008 Juno Award for Francophone Album of the Year for L'Échec du matériel. In November 2009, he released his album Nous and, once again, won the Félix for the Pop-Rock Album in 2010.

In 2010 he wrote the music for the French musical Les Belles-Soeurs and its 2014 English adaptation, Belles Soeurs: The musical.

In 2018 his album Paloma was named Francophone Album of the Year at the Juno Awards.

In 2020, he appeared as a guest vocalist on "Signal", a track on electronic musician CRi's album Juvenile. In the same year he released Travelling, an album of instrumental music inspired by film soundtracks. This release gave him the prize of best instrumental album of the year at the ADISQ Gala

His 2022 album, Mercure en mai, was a Juno nominee for Francophone Album of the Year at the Juno Awards of 2023.

In 2025 he was inducted into the Ordre des arts et des lettres du Québec.

== Discography ==
Title	Details	Peak chart positions
Title	Details	CAN
Les Insomniaques s'amusent	Release date: June 1992; Formats: CD	—
Quatre saisons dans le désordre	Release date: 12 May 1996; Formats: CD	86
Tricycle	Release date: June 1999; Formats: CD	—
Rêver mieux	Release date: 16 October 2001; Formats: CD	—
Déflaboxe	Release date: 19 November 2003; Formats: CD	—
L'Échec du matériel	Release date: 4 April 2007; Formats: CD, digital download	2
Joli chaos	Release date: 25 November 2008; Formats: CD, digital download	20
Nous	Release date: 10 November 2009; Formats: CD	5
Chic de ville	Release date: 5 March 2013; Formats: CD	2
Paloma	Release date: 25 November 2016; Formats: CD, digital download	8
Travelling	Release date: 2 October 2020; Formats: CD, digital download	17
Mercure en mai	Release date: 14 October 2022; Formats: CD, digital download	4
"—" denotes releases that did not chart

== Videography ==
- Ensorcelée (1992)
- Les temps fous (1992)
- Le parapluie (1996)
- Chante encore (2002)
- Spoutnik (2002)
- Reste (2009)
