= Tricycle (disambiguation) =

A tricycle is a non-motorized vehicle with three wheels.

Tricycle may also refer to:

== Vehicles with three wheels ==
- Motorized tricycle, resembling a bicycle with two rear wheels and an engine
  - Motorized tricycle (Philippines)
- Tricycle landing gear, an aircraft undercarriage configuration

== Other uses ==
- Tricycle, by Flim & the BB's, 1983
- Tricycle (album), by Daniel Bélanger, 1999
- "Tricycle" (song), by Psapp, 2006
- Duško Popov (1912–1981), Serbian World War II triple agent codenamed Tricycle by the British MI5
- Tricycle: The Buddhist Review, an American quarterly magazine
- Tricycle Press, an American children's publishing imprint
- Tricycle Theatre, in London, England

== See also ==
- Tricicle, Catalan comic mime troupe
- Three-wheeler
- Three-wheeled vehicle (disambiguation)
- Trike (disambiguation)
