= Nous (Daniel Bélanger album) =

Studio album by Daniel Bélanger
- Released: November 10, 2009
- Genre: Pop
- Length: 60:01
- Label: Audiogram

Daniel Bélanger chronology
Joli chaos (2008)	Nous (2009)	Chic de ville (2013)

Nous is the sixth studio album by Québécois singer and musician Daniel Bélanger, and was released in 2009. It was a Juno Award nominee for Francophone Album of the Year at the Juno Awards of 2011.

== Track listing ==
1. Reste - 6:18
2. Facile - 3:45
3. Qui ne suis-je? - 3:27
4. Si l'amour te ressemblait - 6:28
5. Jamais loin - 3:17
6. Le toit du monde - 5:23
7. Céleste - 3:19
8. Impossible - 2:39
9. J'aime ton soleil - 2:46
10. L'équivalence des contraires - 5:46
11. Roule - 4:33
12. Mieux vaut voler - 8:00
13. Tu peux partir - 4:04
