= Déflaboxe =

Studio album by Daniel Bélanger
- Released: November 19, 2003
- Genres: Pop, Trip hop, Plunderphonics, Sampledelia
- Length: 40:55
- Labels: Audiogram; ADCD 10137
- Producers: Carl Bastien; Daniel Belanger

Daniel Bélanger chronology
| Rêver mieux (2001) | Déflaboxe (2003) | L'Échec du matériel (2007) |

Déflaboxe is the fourth studio album by Québécois singer and musician Daniel Bélanger. Déflaboxe is a concept album about a has-been box fighter. The sound of this album differs from his usual pop/rock sound to a trip hop sound, sampling various old Québecois records. Bélanger also uses a vocal delivery similar to slam.

== Track listing ==
1. "Intro" - 3:34
2. "Round 1" - 2:48
3. "Round 2" - 3:04
4. "Round 3" - 5:38
5. "Round 4" - 3:04
6. "Round 5" - 3:34
7. "Round 6" - 4:20
8. "Round 7" - 3:59
9. "Round 8" - 3:21
10. "Round 9" - 3:49
11. "Round 10" - 3:40

== Personnel ==
- Daniel Bélanger - Vocals, Lyrics, Programmation
- Carl Bastien - Keyboard, Bass, Drums, Guitar
- Martin Roy - Bass
- Jean-François Lauzon - Drums
- Alain Bergé - Drums
