= Paloma (album) =

Studio album by Daniel Bélanger
- Released: November 25, 2016
- Genre: Folk rock
- Length: 35:43
- Label: Audiogram
- Producer: Daniel Bélanger

Daniel Bélanger chronology
Chic de ville (2013)	Paloma (2016)

Paloma is the eighth studio album by Canadian rock musician Daniel Bélanger, released November 25, 2016 on Audiogram.

The album won the Prix Félix for Pop Album of the Year. and Bélanger won the award for Concert of the Year in 2017. The album won the Juno Award for Francophone Album of the Year at the Juno Awards of 2018.

== Track listing ==
1. "Ère de glace" (4:12)
2. "Il y a tant à faire" (3:35)
3. "Tout viendra s'effacer" (4:14)
4. "Le fil" (3:42)
5. "Perdre" (3:56)
6. "Métamorphose" (3:04)
7. "Un deux trois j'aurai tout oublié" (3:38)
8. "Prédications" (2:14)
9. "Paloma" (3:03)
10. "Un" (4:05)
