= Three-wheeled vehicle =

A three-wheeler or three-wheeled vehicle is a vehicle with three wheels.

Three-wheeler or three-wheeled vehicle may also refer to:

- Three-wheeled all-terrain vehicle
- Three-wheeled motor scooter
- Three-wheeled steam tank
- Tilting three-wheeler

== See also ==
- Rickshaw (disambiguation)#Vehicles
- Trike (disambiguation)#Vehicles with three wheels
- Tricycle (disambiguation)#Vehicles with three wheels
