= L'Échec du matériel =

Studio album by Daniel Bélanger
- Released: April 4, 2007
- Genre: Pop
- Length: 49:32
- Label: Audiogram ADCD 10202
- Producers: Carl Bastien and Daniel Belanger

Daniel Bélanger chronology
Déflaboxe (2003)	L'Échec du matériel (2007)	Joli chaos (2008)

L'Échec du matériel (English: Failure of Materiality) is the fifth studio album by Québécois singer and musician Daniel Bélanger.

The album went on to win the 2008 Juno Award for Francophone Album of the Year.

== Track listing ==
1. "La Fin de l'homme" (English: The End of Man) - 3:28
2. "Manière de parler" (English: Manner of Speech) - 3:05
3. "Télévision" (English: Television) - 5:31
4. "Drôle de personne" (English: Funny Person) - 4:24
5. "Fermeture définitive" (English: Permanently Closed) - 4:31
6. "Amusements" (English: Play) - 1:59
7. "Tout à coup" (English: Suddenly) - 2:04
8. "Plus" (English: More) - 3:34
9. "Demain, peut-être" (English: Tomorrow, Maybe) - 4:44
10. "La Collision" (English: The collision) - 2:29
11. "L'Échec du matériel" (English: The Failure of Materiality) - 3:03
12. "Relié" (English: Connected) - 3:23
13. "Je suis mort" (English: I am dead) - 4:26
14. "Sports et loisirs" (English: Sport and Leisure) - 2:46
