= Xiaomi M365 =

Electric scooter

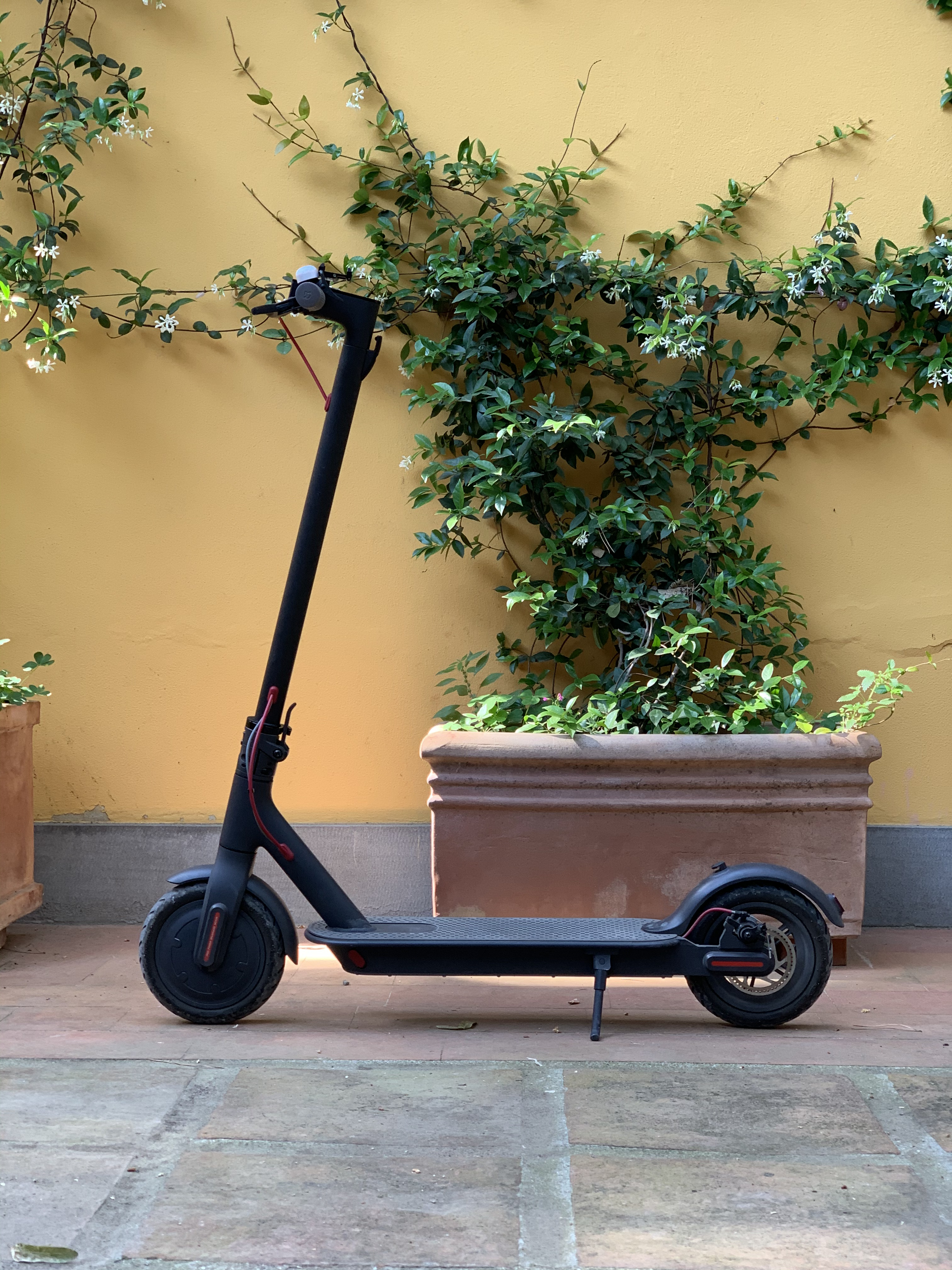
- Black Xiaomi M365
- Manufacturer: Mijia
- Also called: Mi Electric Scooter
- Parent company: Xiaomi
- Assembly: China
- Successor: Xiaomi M365 Pro
- Class: E-scooter
- Engine: Brushless DC electric motor
- Top speed: 30 kilometres per hour (19 mph)
- Power: 250W, peak 500W
- Torque: 16 newton-metres (12 lbf⋅ft)
- Frame type: Aluminum
- Suspension: None
- Brakes: Regenerative braking (KERS), Disk
- Tires: 8.5 inches (220 mm) inflatable pneumatic tires
- Dimensions: L: 108 cm W: 43 cm H: 114 cm
- Weight: 12.5 kilograms (28 lb) (dry)
- Fuel consumption: 1.1kWh per 100 kilometres (62 mi)
- Range: 30 kilometres (19 mi) (ECO mode)

Xiaomi M365 or Mi Electric Scooter is a consumer e-scooter by the Chinese electronics company Xiaomi. Released in December 2016, it debuted three months before the dockless rental scooter operator Bird commenced service. The M365 is the model used for the original Bird rental scooters.

In terms of private ownership, the model is readily available in Europe, where it is said to have "democratized" the motorized kick scooter, due to its competitive price (often €350–€400), and it being one of the easiest scooters to operate.

== Mechanical design ==
The electric motor is located in the front wheel making the M365 front wheel drive, while the battery and motor controller are located in the compartment under the deck. The brake lever triggers two braking systems, firstly regenerative braking (KERS) by the motor in the front wheel, followed by mechanical disk braking, located in the rear wheel, which ensures a short stopping distance.

It has a folding mechanism, which can, for example, be used on public transport.

== Electronics ==
The red light means charging and green light means fully charged or disconnected.

A line cable connects between controller and dashboard. The controller voltage is DC 36V and controller rated power 350W.

The battery is connected to the charge port, controller and rear light.

== Issues ==
The scooter used to be vulnerable to remote hacking, which included triggering the brake or speeding it up.

Some units in select markets were recalled due to a screw in the folding mechanism that became loose; this could cause the stem to break off while in use.

== M365 Pro and other Xiaomi models ==
The successor, called the M365 Pro, has refined the original M365 by including a colour graphical display, an increased range of 45 km (28 miles), as well as more power from the electric motor, at 300W (peak 600W). The length and width of the deck has also been increased, improving comfort. Safety improvements have also been made, including a larger disk for the rear brake.
