= Chic de ville =

Studio album by Daniel Bélanger
- Released: March 5, 2013
- Genres: Folk rock, country, rockabilly
- Label: Audiogram
- Producers: Michel Dagenais; Daniel Bélanger

Daniel Bélanger chronology
Nous (2009)	Chic de ville (2013)	Paloma (2016)

Chic de ville is the seventh studio album by Canadian rock musician Daniel Bélanger, released March 5, 2013 on Audiogram. Inspired in part by his experience composing a theatrical score for a 2010 production of Michel Tremblay's play Les Belles-sœurs, on Chic de ville Bélanger explores elements of country music and rockabilly.

The album debuted at #2 on the Canadian Albums Chart. Most of the album was previewed on CBC Radio's À Propos, a program devoted to exposing French-language music from Quebec to a Canada-wide audience, on the weekend of March 2 and 3, 2013.

== Track listing ==
1. "Ouverture" (0:31)
2. "Chacun pour soi" (5:48)
3. "Sa félinité" (2:50)
4. "Béatitude" (3:39)
5. "Avec mes amis" (2:28)
6. "L'Aube" (3:08)
7. "Auprès de toi" (2:59)
8. "Le temps est charognard" (2:52)
9. "Domino" (2:41)
10. "Je t'aime comme tu es" (3:11)
11. "Je poursuis mon bonheur" (2:29)
12. "Traverse-moi" (3:50)
13. "Le Cœur en mille morceaux" (2:19)
14. "Pour être heureux" (2:26)
15. "Rapport d'accident survenu le 26" (4:14)
