= Trike =

Trike may refer to:

== Vehicles with three wheels and seated ==
- Drift trike, a type of recreational tricycle with no pedals
- Electric trike
- Motorized tricycle
  - Motorized tricycle (Philippines)
- Three-wheeler
- Tricycle (non-motorized)
- Ultralight trike, a type of powered hang glider

== Music ==
- Trike (album), by Bob Log III
- Trike (EP), by You Am I

== Other uses ==
- Triceratops, a dinosaur with three horns
- Trichloroethylene, a chemical compound commonly used as a solvent

== See also ==
- Tricycle (disambiguation)
- Trikke, a three-wheeled scooter-like vehicle powered by shifting bodyweight
- Twike, a three-wheeled hybrid velomobile
- Autocycle (disambiguation)
