= Quatre saisons dans le désordre =

Studio album by Daniel Bélanger
- Released: May 12, 1996
- Genre: Rock
- Length: 52:57
- Label: Audiogram; ADCD 1090

Daniel Bélanger chronology
Les Insomniaques s'amusent (1992)	Quatre saisons dans le désordre (1996)	Tricycle (1999)

Quatre saisons dans le désordre (direct English translation: Four Seasons in Disorder) is the second album by Québécois singer and musician Daniel Bélanger. Release by Audiogram on May 28, 1996, the album earned the 1996 Félix Award for pop-rock album of the year.

The album when platinum in 1996 and spent 72 weeks on the charts, hitting the #1 spot for 10 weeks.

== Recording ==
The songs for the album were written over ten months. The musicians practiced for two weeks before showing the songs to the public at the concert hall Vieux-Clocher in Magog, Quebec.

According to Bélanger, the musicians entered the studio highly motivated ("gonflés à bloc"), and the recording process was smooth and enjoyable. The sessions unfolded naturally and without stress, resulting in what they described as a particularly inspired album.

== Track listing ==
1. "Quatre saisons dans le désordre" – 4:47
2. "Sortez-moi de moi" (Daniel Bélanger, Michel Bélanger) – 5:30
3. "Les Deux Printemps" – 3:14
4. "Monsieur Verbêtre" – 3:44
5. "Respirer dans l'eau" – 4:13
6. "Cruel (Il fait froid, on gèle)" – 3:49
7. "La Voie lactée" – 2:46
8. "Les Temps fous" – 4:25
9. "Imparfait" – 3:55
10. "Le Parapluie" – 5:32
11. "Je fais de moi un homme" – 4:23
12. "Projection dans le bleu" – 3:57
13. "Primate électrique" – 2:37
