= Les Insomniaques s'amusent =

Studio album by Daniel Bélanger
- Released: June 1992
- Studio: Studio Piccolo, Studio Victor, Studio St-Charles, La Majeure
- Genre: Pop rock
- Length: 43:01
- Label: Audiogram; ADCD 10066
- Producer: Rick Haworth (tracks 2, 4, 5, 7, 9-11), Sylvain Lefebvre (track 1), Paul Pagé (tracks 3, 6 and 8; assisted on tracks 6 and 8 by Rick Haworth),

Daniel Bélanger chronology
Les Insomniaques s'amusent (1992)	Quatre saisons dans le désordre (1996)

Les Insomniaques s'amusent ("Insomniacs Have Fun") is the first album by Québécois singer and musician Daniel Bélanger, released in June 1992 on Audiogram.

The album's lead single, "Opium", was Bélanger's breakthrough hit on radio. Despite this, it was the third single, "Sèche tes pleurs", that caused the album's sales to explode in early 1993 after several months as a modest-selling "sleeper" hit.

Bélanger attributed the album's unique sound to the marriage of his own French chansonnier tendencies with the North American rock, folk and blues influences of producer and guitarist Rick Haworth. Early in the album's release cycle, he faced some dismissive claims that he had only been signed to Audiogram because his older brother Michel was one of the label's owners, but this criticism had faded out by the time of "Sèche tes pleurs".

The music video for "Opium", directed by Lyne Charlebois, won the Félix Award for Video of the Year at the 14th Félix Awards in 1992. Bélanger was also nominated for Revelation of the Year.

The album won the Félix Award for Pop-Rock Album of the Year at the 15th Félix Awards in 1993, with Bélanger also garnering nominations for Best Male Artist and Singer of the Year.

The album was shortlisted in the 1986-1995 category for the Slaight Family Polaris Heritage Prize at the 2018 Polaris Music Prize.

== Track listing ==
1. La folie en quatre - 3:55
2. Ensorcelée - 4:12
3. Sèche tes pleurs - 2:38
4. Désespéré - 4:37
5. Ma dépendance - 3:27
6. Opium - 4:39
7. Quand le jour se lève - 4:16
8. Le bonheur - 4:38
9. Jamais les heures - 4:13
10. Mon retour - 3:59
11. L'Autruche - 2:21

== Personnel ==
- Daniel Bélanger: Vocals, guitars, synthesizers, piano
- Rick Haworth: Acoustic, electric (6-and 12-string), baritone, pedal steel and Hawaiian lap steel guitars, mandolin, tiple, mandocello, drum programming
- Kenny Pearson: Hammond B-3, synthesizers
- Claude Chaput: Synth programming
- Denis Labrosse, Mario Légaré: Bass
- Dominique Messier: Drums, drum programming, percussion
- Camile Belisle: Drums
- Ron Di Lauro: Bugle

== Production ==
- Mixed by Glen Robinson at Le Studio (Morin Heights)
- Mixing assistant: Rick Haworth
- Track 1 mixed by Paul Pagé at Studio Saint-Charles
- Mastered by Howie Weinburg at Masterdisk, New York City
- Additional mastering by Bill Kipper at SNB Mastering, Montreal
- A&R: Michel Bélanger
- Sleeve designer: Anne Thomas Designer/Benoît Lagacé
- Front cover photo designer: Lyne Charlebois, David Franco
- Front cover photo: Jean-François Gratton
