= Rêver mieux =

Studio album by Daniel Bélanger
- Released: October 16, 2001
- Genre: Pop music
- Length: 60:37
- Label: Audiogram; ADCD 10150

Daniel Bélanger chronology
Tricycle (1999)	Rêver mieux (2001)	Déflaboxe (2003)

Rêver mieux is the third studio album by Québécois singer and musician Daniel Bélanger. It was his first album to incorporate electronic music elements into his sound, which Bélanger attributed to the influence of recent music by Beth Orton, DJ Shadow and Depeche Mode.

It was certified platinum in January 2002 for selling more than 100,000 copies.

The album's supporting tour was noted for the participation of the then-unknown Ariane Moffatt as a keyboardist and backing vocalist.

== Awards ==
The album was nominated for several Prix Félix in 2002, winning for Best Album and Best Pop Rock Album. Bélanger also won the award for Best Concert, and was cowinner with Garou of the award for Best Male Artist. The album won the Juno Award for Francophone Album of the Year at the Juno Awards of 2003, and was shortlisted for Album of the Year.

== Track listing ==
1. "Te quitter" - 3:48
2. "Fous n'importe où" - 3:59
3. "Chante encore" - 4:30
4. "Une femme, un train, un homme et une gare" - 4:12
5. "Dans un spoutnik" - 5:35
6. "Tu tombes" - 3:12
7. "Une chanson pour moi" - 2:59
8. "Dis tout sans rien dire" - 3:23
9. "Intouchable et immortel" - 7:56
10. "Fugue en sol inconnu" - 4:37
11. "Air pur" - 5:53
12. "Rêver mieux" - 3:19
13. "Comme des amants" - 3:48
14. "Revivre" - 3:21

== Certifications ==
Country	Provider	Certification
Canada	CRIA	Platinum (100,000)

== Year-end charts ==
2001 year-end chart performance for Rêver mieux
Chart (2001)	Peak position
Canadian Albums (Nielsen SoundScan)	110

2002 year-end chart performance for Rêver mieux
Chart (2002)	Position
Canadian Albums (Nielsen SoundScan)	86
