= Legal definition of motorcycle =

The legal definition of a motorcycle for the purposes of registration, taxation and rider licensing in most countries is a powered two-wheel motor vehicle. Most countries distinguish between mopeds up to 49 cc and the more powerful, larger, vehicles known as motorcycles, including scooter type motorcycles. Many jurisdictions include some forms of three-wheelers as motorcycles.

== Australia and New Zealand ==
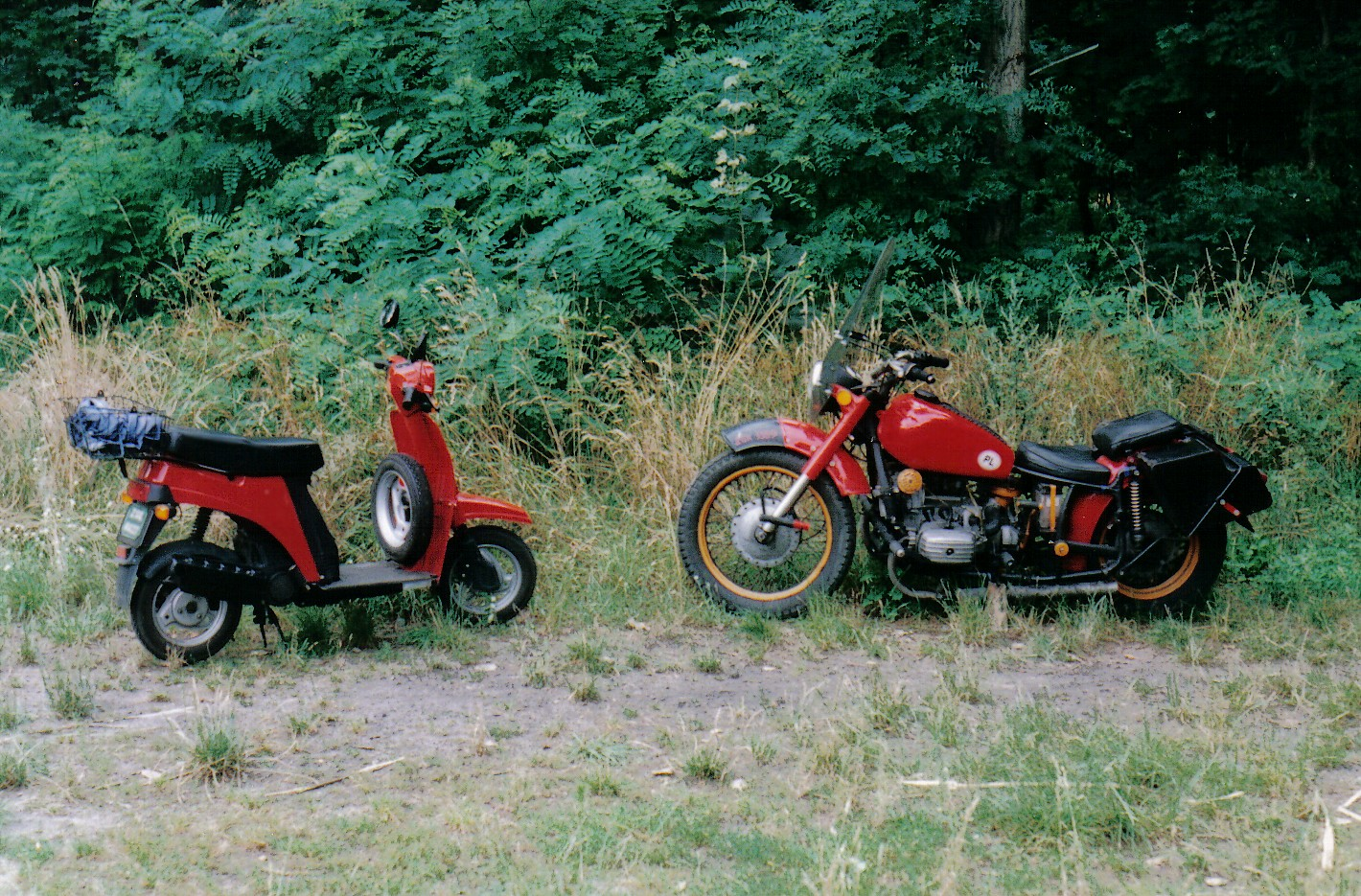
Scooter type (left) and cruiser type (right) motorcycles

In New Zealand, a motorcycle is any two- or three-wheeled motor vehicle weighing less than 1,000 kg, that can travel faster than 50 km/h or that has an engine capacity exceeding 50 cc. A moped is a motorcycle-like vehicle with an engine capacity under 50 cc and that cannot exceed 50 km/h.

Motorcycles may only be driven on a motorcycle (class 6) licence; a moped can be driven on a car (class 1) licence. Riders on their learners or restricted motorcycle licence can only ride approved motorcycles on the Learner Approved Motorcycle Scheme (LAMS) list. These motorcycles must have an engine capacity of 660 cc or less and a power-to-weight ratio of 150 kW/tonne or less (when including a 90 kg rider). Motorcycles with an engine capacity of 250 cc or less are automatically approved, except for a small number of high-performance machines. Pre-1960 motorcycles are exempt from the power-to-weight ratio restriction.

The legal age to be eligible to apply for a New Zealand motorcycle licence is 16 years and over. New Zealand employs a three stage system for motor vehicle licensing. At age 16, an individual can gain their first licence known as their "learner licence". They must hold this for at least 6 months before they are able to move on to their "restricted licence". They must then hold this restricted licence for one and half years. After a period of 6–18 months, depending on age and additional training, a holder of a restricted licence may sit the third and final stage known as the "full licence".

A similar system is used in most states of Australia, with some variations. "Learners Permit" and "Provisional" licence holders must not have bikes that exceed a power-to-weight ratio of 150 kW/tonne or 660 cc, whichever comes first. All 250 cc bikes (with a few listed exceptions) are automatically included in this LAMS (Learner Approved Motorcycle Scheme) list.

Before getting a learners permit a pre-learner course is required, which issues a certificate of completion, valid for 3 months. Upon passing a computer test, the rider is granted a learners permit, which is valid for 12 months. Whilst on a learners permit, the rider may not carry a pillion or side car and may not exceed 80 kilometres per hour (50 mph) or the posted speed limit, whichever is lower, in certain jurisdictions.

To progress to a provisional licence, the rider must successfully complete a pre-provisional riders course, followed by a riding skills test called MOST (Motorcycle Operator Skill Test). The rider is then able to obtain a P1 provisional licence enabling a new upper speed limit of 90 kilometres per hour (56 mph) and giving the rider a maximum of four demerit points. These licences can be renewed and must be held without suspension for 12 months, after which time it can be upgraded to a P2 provisional licence, which is then to be held for 2 more years before the rider obtains their full licence, providing they have not breached any laws causing them to be suspended or disqualified in that period. P2 provisional riders have an upper speed limit of 100 kilometres per hour (62 mph) and a maximum of seven demerit points. P2 provisional riders are permitted to carry a pillion, P1 riders are not. There are exceptions to this rule for mature age licence holders who also hold an unrestricted drivers license, who may be eligible to bypass the P2 provisional period.

== Canada and the US ==
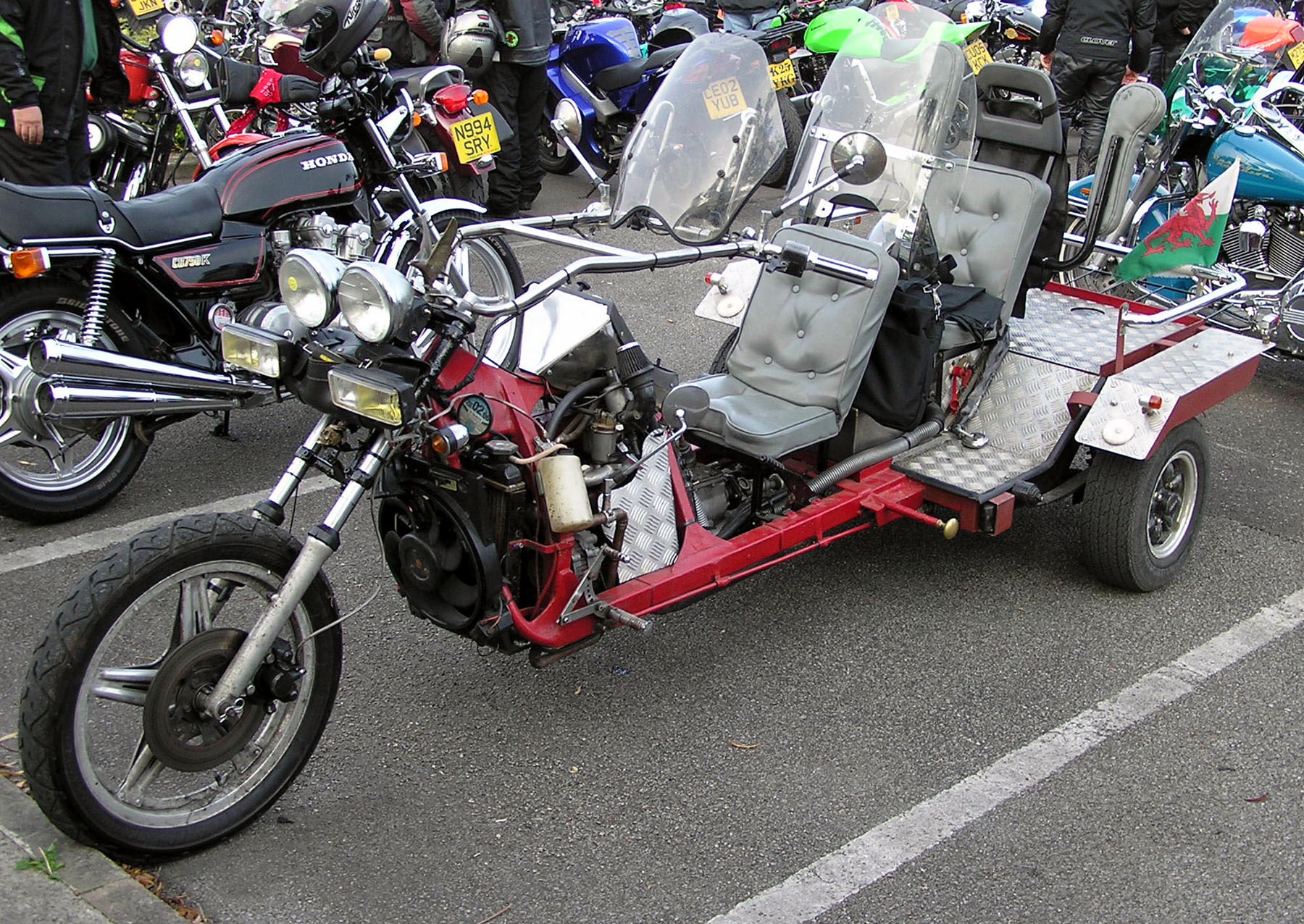
In many jurisdictions, the term "motorcycle" includes trikes.

In Canada and the United States three-wheeled motor vehicles fall under the auspices of motorcycle regulations. The laws and regulations for legal moped usage in the U.S. vary by state.

In the United States, licensing requirements vary widely among the states and territories, but generally riders are required to pass written and practical (on-cycle) competency tests. In about half the states, successful completion of a rider education course (such as those offered by the Motorcycle Safety Foundation) is accepted by state licensing agencies in lieu of examination. The specifics of the motorcycle and moped laws in the U.S. can be obtained from each individual state's Department of Motor Vehicles website.

== United Kingdom ==
These rules have recently changed.

Motorcycle riders in the UK must normally take a one-day Compulsory Basic Training (CBT) course, regardless of which class of motorcycle they intend to ride. In addition a theory test must be taken prior to taking a practical test for any type of motorcycle licence.

Entry level to motorcycling at age 16 is the moped, a motorcycle of engine capacity no greater than 50 cc restricted to a maximum design speed of 50 km/h (31 mph).

At age 17 the rider may have a "light motorcycle" with an engine up to 125 cc and a power output not exceeding 11 kW (15 hp). Only a CBT certificate, obtained within the past two years, and a provisional licence is needed to ride a learner motorcycle with an L-plate. After passing a test on a 125 cc machine, riders will be restricted to ride a "large restricted motorcycle", which has a maximum power output of 25 kW (34 hp). After two years this restriction is lifted and any size or power of motorcycle may be ridden.

For riders over age 21 there is a direct access route to gaining a licence to ride a "large motorcycle" of any engine capacity or power, which allows somebody with no motorcycle experience to train and pass a test in around five days.

Three-wheeled vehicles weighing less than 8 cwt (896 lb / 406 kg) were long classified as motorcycles in the UK and could be driven with a full motorcycle licence. A requirement there be no reverse gear fitted was dropped in the 1960s. This exemption was linked to the enduring popularity of three-wheeled vehicles in the UK (such as the Reliant Regal van) but was abolished for new licence holders in October 2000. Mass-production of three-wheelers ceased in 1998 but the licensing exemption still benefits trikes and their riders.
