= Electric trike =

Electric powered three-wheeled vehicle

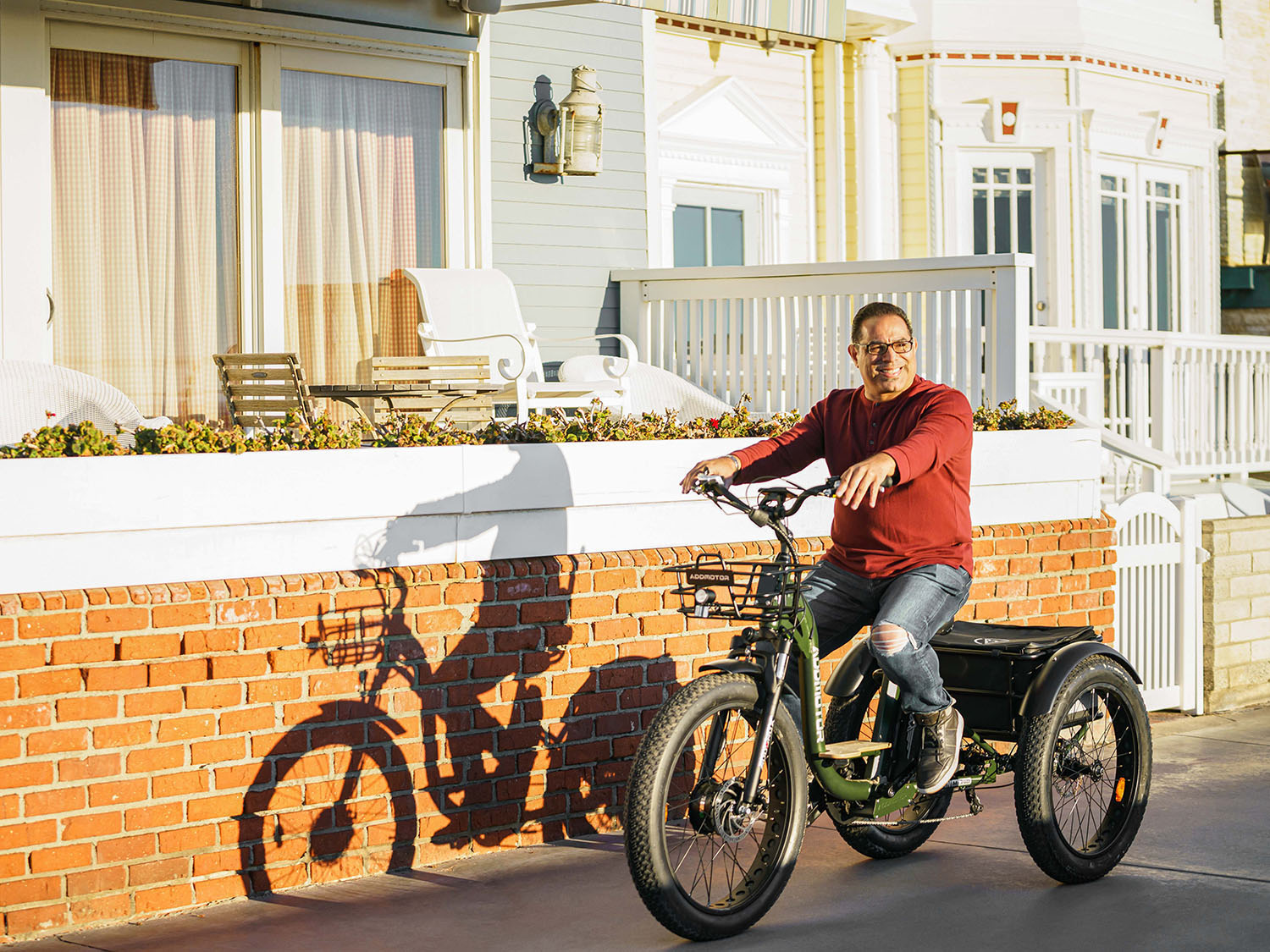
Example of a fat-tire e-trike with a bicycle-like construction

An electric trike also known as an e-trike is a three-wheeled vehicle powered by an electric motor. These vehicles exist in various shapes, constructions, and capabilities. The most common type are constructed primarily of bicycle parts but vehicles made with motorcycle, car, tuktuk, or golf cart parts also exist alongside vehicles that resemble none of those.

== Overview ==
=== Definition ===
All electric trikes have three wheels but the design, size, speed, and capabilities vary significantly across models. Depending on weight, motor power, and size, etrikes can be classified as bicycles, cars, motorcycles, mobility scooters, or be exempt from classification.

While the normal legal definition of motorcycle is a two-wheeled vehicle, in some countries a motorcycle may also be three-wheeled. This classification does not usually depend on whether the operator is fully enclosed or exposed to the elements.

=== Configurations ===
Three-wheeled vehicles with one front wheel and two rear wheels are known as a delta design or the traditional trike (tricycle) design, while vehicles with two front wheels and one rear wheel are known as a tadpole design. Either the front or rear wheels may be used for turning, depending on the construction. Some trikes lean one or more wheels while turning which helps with balance, stability, and turning radius while providing a natural feel for those used to bicycles or motorcycles.

== Electric Trike Types ==
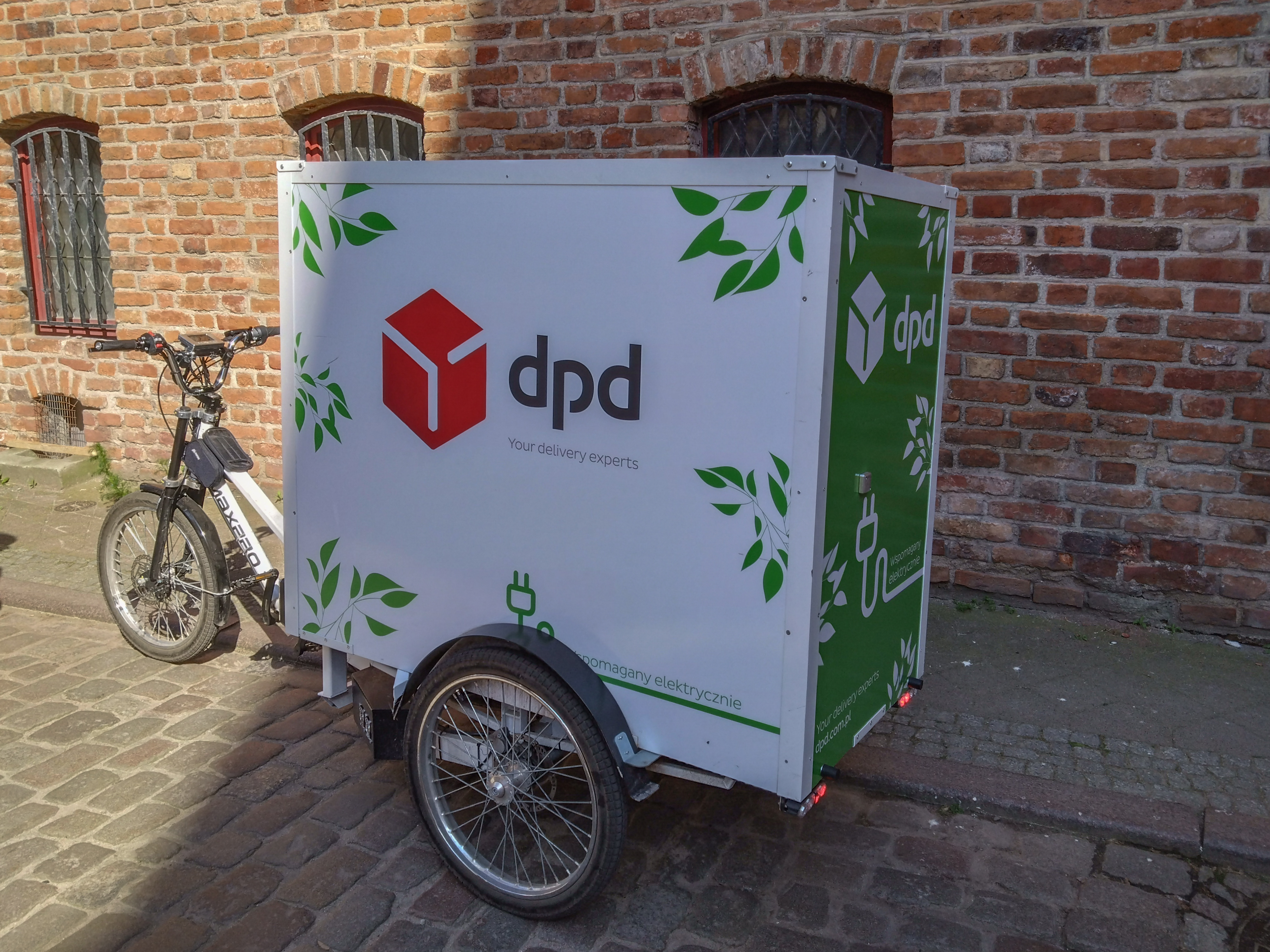
A delivery e-trike in Gdańsk

Electric trikes come in various styles, each designed to cater to different needs and preferences. Whether you're looking for comfort, practicality, or performance, there’s an electric trike to match your lifestyle. Here are the main types of electric trikes:

1. Traditional Electric Trike A classic design that provides everyday comfort and stability. Perfect for general commuting and casual rides, these trikes offer a more upright riding position, making them ideal for those who prefer a familiar and straightforward cycling experience.
2. Recumbent Electric Trike Designed for those who prefer a laid-back riding experience. With a reclining seat, recumbent trikes offer reduced strain on the back and joints. They're ideal for long-distance riders and anyone seeking a more relaxed position while riding.
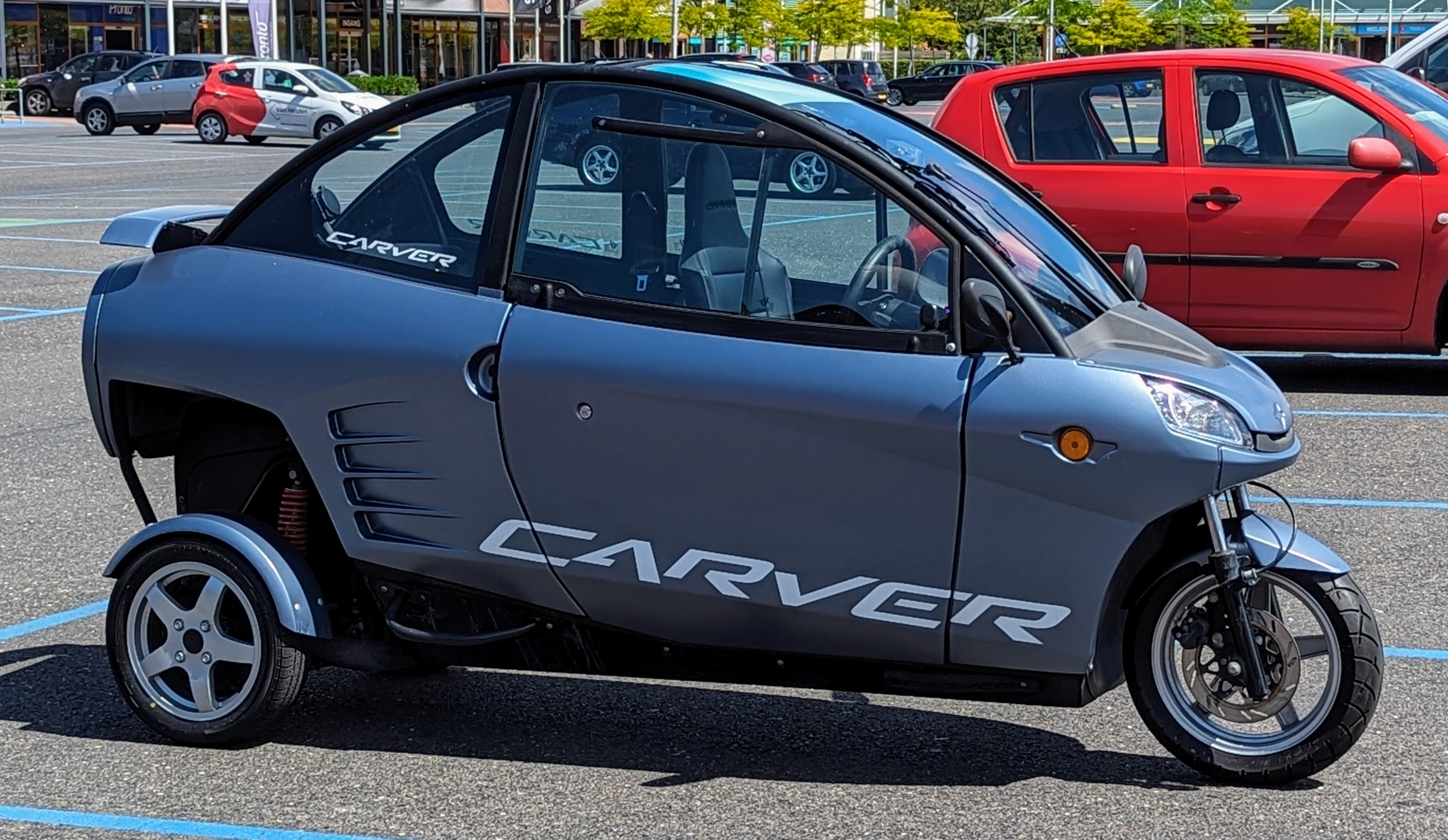
3. An electric tricycle with an enclosure similar to a car as well as a lean-to-turn mechanism similar to a bicycle or motorycycle
  Folding Electric Trike Compact and space-saving, these trikes are ideal for urban living and travel. The ability to fold down makes them easy to store and transport, perfect for people who need a portable, convenient mobility solution.
4. Fat Tire Electric Trike Built for off-road adventures, these trikes come with larger tires for extra grip and stability. Ideal for riding on snow, sand, gravel, and rough terrain, fat tire trikes offer versatility for outdoor enthusiasts.
5. Cargo Electric Trike Perfect for hauling goods, groceries, or even children. These trikes come with extended cargo space or racks, making them great for deliveries or anyone needing extra capacity on their rides.
6. Reverse Electric Trike Featuring two wheels in the front for improved stability, reverse electric trikes offer excellent handling and balance. This configuration is often preferred for those who value safety and easy maneuverability.
7. Passenger Electric Trike These trikes are designed for carrying one or more passengers. They come with larger seating arrangements, enhanced safety features, and comfort, making them suitable for family rides or transporting passengers in urban environments.
8. Semi-recumbent Electric Trike A hybrid design combining features of both traditional and recumbent trikes. It offers a comfortable, relaxed riding position while maintaining some of the upright posture, ideal for those seeking a balance between comfort and a more active riding style.

== Electric assisted velomobiles ==
Some three-wheeled electric vehicles, such as the Twike and the Myers Motors NmG, enclose the rider in a cabin or cockpit.

== Electric Trike History ==
The electric tricycle, which combines the stability of a three-wheeled vehicle with electric propulsion, has a long history dating back to the late 19th century. The first electric tricycle was created in 1881 by Gustave Trouvé in Paris, marking a pivotal moment in the development of electric mobility. This invention aimed to provide a cleaner, quieter alternative to steam-powered and early internal combustion vehicles, while offering improved stability over traditional bicycles.

Following Trouvé’s lead, other inventors and manufacturers began experimenting with electric trikes. In 1886, the Possons brothers of Cleveland, Ohio, built a similar vehicle in North America. The late 1800s saw various advancements, such as the development of electric motor technologies and battery systems, which helped make electric tricycles more practical.

By the late 19th century, the electric tricycle began to serve both personal and commercial uses, such as deliveries, highlighting its potential for urban mobility. Early models were often bulky due to the weight of the batteries, but the vehicles represented an innovative step in the evolution of electric vehicles. Despite their early promise, electric tricycles, along with electric cars, struggled to compete with the rise of gasoline-powered vehicles, which offered longer range and faster speeds.

In recent decades, advancements in battery technology and growing demand for sustainable transportation have led to a resurgence of electric tricycles, which are now widely used for personal transportation, delivery services, and accessibility solutions for seniors and people with disabilities.
