= La Voix season 4 =

2016 season of French-Canadian reality-TV series

La Voix
- Season 4
- Hosted by: Charles Lafortune
- Judges: Ariane Moffatt; Marc Dupré; Éric Lapointe; Pierre Lapointe
- Winner: Stéphanie St-Jean
- Runner-up: Travis Cormier

Release
- Original network: TVA
- Original release: January 17 – April 10, 2016

Season chronology
- ← Previous; Season 3 Next → Season 5

La Voix is the French Canadian version of the Dutch reality vocal competition created by John de Mol The Voice of Holland . Season 4 of La Voix was broadcast from 2016 on TVA and is hosted for a fourth consecutive season by Charles Lafortune. Éric Lapointe, Marc Dupré and Pierre Lapointe season 3 judges all returned, whereas third season judge Isabelle Boulay was replaced by Ariane Moffatt, who returned after a two-season hiatus.

== Teams ==
Key

- Winner
- Runner-up
- Third place
- Fourth place
- Eliminated in the Semifinals (Crossed Battles)
- Eliminated in the Live shows
- Eliminated in Champs de Bataille
- Artist was stolen by another coach at the Battle rounds
- Eliminated in the Battle rounds

Coaches	Artists			
Ariane Moffatt				
Ariane Moffatt	Noémie Lorzema	Amélie Nault	Elie Haroun	Soran Dussaigne
Ariane Moffatt	Martin Goyette	Tim Brink	Rafaëlle Lafrance	Patricia Bernier
Ariane Moffatt	~~Mary-Pier Guilbault~~	~~Sophia Bel~~	Anthony Seguin	Marie-Pierre Leduc
Ariane Moffatt	Stéfanie Parnell	Nicolas Muraton		
Éric Lapointe				
Éric Lapointe	Travis Cormier	Markos Gonzalez C.	Marie-Ève Lapierre	Alexander Brown
Éric Lapointe	David Latulippe	Lou-Adriane Cassidy	Thomas Argouin	Rebecca Fiset-Coté
Éric Lapointe	~~Geneviève Paré~~	~~Stéphanie St-Jean~~	Jason-Neil Tremblay	Léa Sanacore
Éric Lapointe	Annick Gagnon	Haingo Nirina		
Pierre Lapointe				
Pierre Lapointe	Stéphanie St-Jean	Béatrice Keeler	Sabrina Bellemare	Marielle Varin
Pierre Lapointe	Ryan Kennedy	Shy Shy Schullie	Sophia Bel	Isabelle Young
Pierre Lapointe	~~Rafaëlle Lafrance~~	Ania El Maachir	David Rozon	Marie Bélisle
Pierre Lapointe	Anna-Kim Lévéillée	Simon Patenaude		
Marc Dupré				
Marc Dupré	Yvan Pedneault	Geneviève Leclerc	Jonny Arsenault	Mary-Pier Guilbault
Marc Dupré	Sophia-Rose Boulanger	Mélanie Cormier	Pastel Soucy-Gagné	Geneviève Paré
Marc Dupré	~~Rebecca Fiset-Côté~~	~~Alexander Brown~~	~~Patricia Bernier~~	Jesse Racicot
Marc Dupré	Genesis Ritchot	Yohann Beaufils		

== Season ==
=== Blind Auditions ===
==== Episode 1 ====
Group performance : Quand la musique est bonne - Jean-Jacques Goldman

Order	Contestant (age, city)	Song	Choice			
Order	Contestant (age, city)	Song	Ariane	Éric	Pierre	Marc
1	Travis Cormier (22, Moncton)	Dream On - Aerosmith				
2	Anna-Kim Lévéillée (22, Mont-Tremblant)	Petit papillon - Jean Leloup		—		—
3	Martin Goyette (38, Montréal)	Nobody Knows You When You're Down and Out - Eric Clapton				
4	Dominic St-Laurent (26, Montreal)	Oxygène - Diane Dufresne	—	—	—	—
5	Béatrice Keeler (23, Ontario)	La Mer - Charles Trenet				—
6	Noémie Lorzema (17, Montreal)	Lift Me Up - Christina Aguilera				
7	Juan Mateo (21 - Bogota)	Aguanile - Marc Anthony	—	—	—	—
8	Geneviève Leclerc (32, Gatineau)	Big Spender - Sweet Charity				
9	Marie Bélisle (31, Sherbrook)	Tout de moi - Seymour Simons and Gérald Marks	—			—
10	Genesis Ritchot (20, Gatineau)	What We Ain't Got - Jake Owen	—	—	—	
11	Stéphanie Lamia (27, Grau-du-roi)	Si tu veux m'essayer - Florent Pagny	—	—	—	—
12	Markos Gonzalez Clemente (15, Montreal)	Mack The Knife - Bobby Darin				

==== Episode 2 ====
Order	Contestant (age, city)	Song	Choice			
Order	Contestant (age, city)	Song	Ariane	Éric	Pierre	Marc
1	Yvan Pedneault (35, Sept-Iles)	We are the champions - Queen				
2	Marie-Eve Lapierre (24, Sainte-Thérèse)	J'ai quitté mon île - Daniel Lavoie	—		—	—
3	Sophie Castonguay (28, Gastonville)	J'entends ta voix - France D'Amour	—	—	—	—
4	Ryan Kennedy (28, Saint-Sauveur)	I'm On fire - Bruce Springsteen	—			
5	Haingo Nirina (33, Antananarivo)	Georgia in my mind - Ray Charles			—	—
6	Brigitte LeBlanc (50, Iles de la madeleine)	Joue-Moi du zydéco - Gerry Cormier	—	—	—	—
7	Soran Dussaigne (17, Montreal)	Hotel California - The Eagles				
8	Anick Gagnon (36, Saint-Constant)	La plus belle pour aller danser - Michèle Richard	—			—
9	Jonny Arsenault (24, Carleton-sur-mer)	Pressure and Time - Rival Sons	—		—	
10	Noémie Bélanger (15, Saint-Constant)	Adieu - Cœur de pirate	—	—	—	—
11	Rafaëlle LaFrance (51, Mont Saint-Hilaire)	Heart of Stone - Rolling Stones				
12	Marie-Pierre LeDuc (38, Salaberry-de-Valleyfield)	Tandem - Vanessa Paradis		—	—	—
13	Eric Beaudoin (23, Bathurst)	When We Were On Fire - James Bay	—	—	—	—
14	Alexander Brown (27, Londres)	Trouble - Elvis Presley				

==== Episode 3 ====
Order	Contestant (age, city)	Song	Choice			
Order	Contestant (age, city)	Song	Ariane	Éric	Pierre	Marc
1	Sophia-Rose Boulanger (15, Saint-Bruno)	Nella Fantasia - Ennio Morricone				
2	Marjolaine Morasse (25, Longueuil)	Sensualité - Axelle Red	—	—	—	—
3	David Rozon (37, Montreal)	State Trooper - Bruce Springsteen	—			—
4	Sophia Bel (24, Montreal)	On va s'aimer encore - Vincent Vallières			—	—
5	Léa Sanacore (25, Montreal)	Jolene - Dolly Parton	—		—	—
6	Tim Brink (40, Lennoxville)	Hard to Handle - Otis Redding				
7	Ania El Maachir (35, Comanesti)	Belleville - Matthieu Chedid	—	—		—
8	Jessy Bazinet (22, Montreal)	Me Voilà - Bryan Adams	—	—	—	—
9	Stéphanie St-Jean (25, Gatineau)	I am Changing - Jennifer Hudson				
10	Emerik St-Cyr Labbé (?, St-Jean de Richelieu)	La chanson du queteux - La Bottine Souriante	—	—	—	—
11	Rebecca Fiset-Coté (17, Dollards-des-Ormeaux)	Make in rain - Ed Sheeran	—			
12	Jeremy Deslandes (?, Sorel)	Le vent soufflait mes pellicules - Daniel Boucher	—	—	—	—
13	Jason-Neil Tremblay (30, Montreal)	Pour Some Sugar On Me - Def Leppard	—		—	—
14	Amélie Nault (34, Québec)	Skinny Love - Bon Iver				

==== Episode 4 ====
Order	Contestant (age, city)	Song	Choice			
Order	Contestant (age, city)	Song	Ariane	Éric	Pierre	Marc
1	Marielle Varin (16, Saint-Jean-sur-Richelieu)	L'Ephémère - Alexandre Désilets				
2	Shelby Martel (21, ?)	Without You - Harry Nilsson	—	—	—	—
3	Jesse Racicot (28, Montreal)	Are you gonna be my girl - Jet				
4	Shy Shy Schullie (25, Montréal)	Come Running Back To - Sam Cooke	—			—
5	Woodly Laurent Gabriel (?, Montreal)	With you - Chris Brown	—	—	—	—
6	Anthony Séguin (16, Montreal)	Le But - Loco Locass		—	—	—
7	Mélanie Cormier (30, Shediac)	Some Days You Gotta Dance - Dixie Chicks				
8	Geneviève Paré (29, Ste-Marie-de-Beauce)	I Feel Good - James Brown	—		—	—
9	Isabelle Young (23, Rigaud)	Mieux Respirer - Karkwa	—			—
10	Mary-Pier Guilbeault (30, Drummonville)	Son of a preacher man - Dusty Springfield				
11	Thomas Argouin (21, Vallée-Jonction)	L'autre bord - Kaïn	—		—	—
12	Rose Dionne (?, ?)	Juste une petit nuit - Les Colocs	—	—	—	—
13	Julianna and Jesse-James Just Costa (25 and 20, Montreal)	Petite Marie - Francis Cabrel	—	—	—	—
14	Elie Haroun (39, Montreal)	Let's Get It On - Marvin Gaye				

==== Episode 5 ====
Order	Contestant (age, city)	Song	Choice			
Order	Contestant (age, city)	Song	Ariane	Éric	Pierre	Marc
1	Yohann Beaufils (26, Rouen, France)	Comme toi - Jean-Jacques Goldman				
2	Matthieu Rampaud (unknown)	La Météore - Stephen Faulkner	—	—	—	—
3	Stéfanie Parnell (25, Montreal)	From This Valley - The Civil Wars			—	—
4	Patricia Bernier (24, Saints-Anges)	Straight Up - Paula Abdul				
5	Nicolas Muraton (21, Henryville)	Ain't No Sunshine - Bill Withers				—
6	Edouard Lagacé (21, Cowansville)	Cap Enragé - Zachary Richard	Full team	—	—	—
7	Sabrina Bellemare (31, Montreal)	Marcia Baila - Les Rita Mitsouko	Full team			—
8	David LaTulippe (25, Québec)	Hallelujah - Ben l'Oncle Soul	Full team			
9	Pastel Soucy-Gagné (31, Montreal)	I Shall Be Released - Bob Dylan	Full team			
10	Sacha Visagie (?, Oshawa)	Footloose - Kenny Loggins	Full team	—	—	Full team
11	Simon Patenaude (27, Montreal)	Parle-moi de toi - Jean-Louis Aubert	Full team	—		Full team
12	Lou-Adriane Cassidy (18, Québec)	La Voix Humaine - Catherine Major	Full team		Full team	Full team

=== Les duels ===
Co-coaches for the battles:

- Marie-Pierre Arthur for Team Ariane Moffatt
- Michel Rivard for Team Éric Lapointe
- Diane Tell for Team Pierre Lapointe
- Alex Nevsky for Team Marc Dupré

==== Episode 6 ====
The contestant wins the battle and advances to the Chants de Bataille or Live Shows
The contestant loses the battle and is eliminated
The contestant loses the battle but is stolen by another coach

Order	Coach	Artists		Song	Steals			
Order	Coach	Artists		Song	Ariane	Éric	Pierre	Marc
1	Marc	Jonny Arsenault	Jesse Racicot	Are You Gonna Go My Way - Lenny Kravitz	—	—	—	—
2	Pierre	Marielle Varin	Simon Patenaude	J'ai demandé à la lune - Indochine	—	—	—	—
3	Eric	Geneviève Paré	David Latulippe	I Wish - Stevie Wonder	—	—	—	
4	Ariane	Anthony Seguin	Soran Dussaigne	Paradis City - Jean Leloup	—	—	—	—
5	Marc	Geneviève Leclerc	Rebecca Fiset-Côté	Prière Païenne - Céline Dion	—		—	—
6	Pierre	David Rozon	Ryan Kennedy	Like a Rolling Stone - Bob Dylan	—	—	—	—
7	Eric	Lou-Adriane Cassidy	Anick Gagnon	Mappemonde - Les sœurs Boulay	—	—	—	—
8	Ariane	Noémie Lorzema	Marie-Pierre Leduc	I Want To Know What Love Is - Foreigner (Mick Jones)	—	—	—	—

==== Episode 7 ====
Order	Coach	Artists		Song	Steals			
Order	Coach	Artists		Song	Ariane	Éric	Pierre	Marc
1	Eric	Markos Gonzalez Clemente	Haingo Nirina	Cheek To Cheek - Fred and Ginger	—	—	—	—
2	Ariane	Elie Haroun	Mary-Pier Guilbault	Sunny - Boney M.	—	—		
3	Pierre	Rafaëlle Lafrance	Béatrice Keeler	True Colors - Cyndi Lauper		—	—	—
4	Marc	Pastel Soucy-Gagné	Genesis Ritchot	Octobre - Les Cowboys Fringants	—	—	—	—
5	Eric	Stéphanie St-Jean	Thomas Argouin	Mes blues passent pu dans porte - Offenbach	—	—		—
6	Ariane	Stéfanie Parnell	Tim Brink	Suddenly I See - KT Tunstall	—	—	—	—
7	Pierre	Anna-Kim Léveillée	Sabrina Bellemare	Les brunes ne comptent pas pour des prunes - Lio	—	—	—	—
8	Marc	Mélanie Cormier	Alexander Brown	Saturday Night's Alright for Fighting - Elton John			—	—

==== Episode 8 ====
Order	Coach	Artists		Song	Steals			
Order	Coach	Artists		Song	Ariane	Éric	Pierre	Marc
1	Ariane	Martin Goyette	Nicolas Muraton	Rehab - Amy Winehouse	—	—	—	—
2	Marc	Yohann Beaufils	Sophia-Rose Boulanger	S'il suffisait d'aimer - Céline Dion	—	—	—	—
3	Pierre	Ania El Maachir	Isabelle Young	Oublie-moi - Cœur de pirate	—	—	—	—
4	Eric	Travis Cormier	Jason-Neil Tremblay	Knockin' on Heavens' Door - Bob Dylan	—	—	—	—
5	Ariane	Amélie Nault	Sophia Bel	Dernier Jour - Hôtel Morphée	—	—		—
6	Marc	Patricia Bernier	Yvan Pedneault	Whataya Want from Me - Adam Lambert		—	—	—
7	Pierre	Shy Shy Schullie	Marie Bélisle	Ex's & Oh's - Elle King	—	—	—	—
8	Eric	Léa Sanacore	Marie-Eve Lapierre	On ira - Zaz	—	—	—	—

=== Les chants de bataille (Knockouts) ===
At this stage of the competition, each team has 8 members. The coach needs to select 5 artists in his or her team that will go directly to the Live Shows. The 3 remaining contestants then each sing a song to win the 6th place of their team for the Live Shows. At the end of the performances, the coach picks one of the three artists to move on and sing in the Live Shows, while the other two are eliminated.

==== Episode 9 ====
The contestant is safe
The contestant is eliminated

Order	Coach	Contestant	Song
1	Marc Dupré	Pastel Soucy-Gagné	Bring It On Home to Me - Sam Cooke
2	Marc Dupré	Jonny Arsenault	On fait ce qu'on aime - Les Respectables
3	Marc Dupré	Geneviève Paré	Rêver mieux - Daniel Bélanger
4	Eric Lapointe	Alexander Brown	Rock This Town - The Stray Cats
5	Eric Lapointe	Rebecca Fiset-Coté	Je l'aime à mourir - Shakira (version)
6	Eric Lapointe	Thomas Argouin	Faire la paix avec l'amour - Dany Bédar
7	Pierre Lapointe	Isabelle Young	Tes chaleurs - Antoine Gratton
8	Pierre Lapointe	Sophia Bel	High By the Beach - Lana Del Rey
9	Pierre Lapointe	Stéphanie St-Jean	Un peu plus haut - Jean-Pierre Ferland
10	Ariane Moffatt	Patricia Bernier	L'amour a pris son temps - Nathalie Simard
11	Ariane Moffatt	Tim Brink	Everything I Do (I Do It For You) - Bryan Adams
12	Ariane Moffatt	Rafaëlle LaFrance	Je suis venu te dire que je m'en vais - Serge Gainsbourg

=== Live Shows ===
The 4 remaining episodes were broadcast live.

The contestant is safe
The contestant is eliminated

==== Episode 10 ====
At the start of the show, Karim Ouellet sang with the 12 artists that were to perform on that night.

Order	Coach	Contestant	Song	Points (coach)	Points (audience)	Points (total)
1	Éric Lapointe	David Latulippe	L'ombre d'un homme - Ben l'Oncle Soul	25	10	35
2	Éric Lapointe	Lou-Adriane Cassidy	Ne me quitte pas - Jacques Brel	33	11	44
3	Éric Lapointe	Markos Gonzalez Clemente	That's Life - Frank Sinatra	42	79	121
4	Ariane Moffatt	Amélie Nault	Lean On - Major Lazer	60	23	83
5	Ariane Moffatt	Martin Goyette	Jenny - Richard Desjardins	15	28	41
6	Ariane Moffatt	Tim Brink	Marie-Stone - Éric Lapointe	25	49	74
7	Pierre Lapointe	Shy Shy Schullie	Boum - Charles Trenet	41	27	68
8	Pierre Lapointe	Ryan Kennedy	Je reviendrai à Montréal - Robert Charlebois	20	10	30
9	Pierre Lapointe	Beatrice Keeler	Smells Like Teen Spirit - Nirvana	39	63	102
10	Marc Dupré	Mélanie Cormier	We've Got Tonight - Bob Seger	30	13	43
11	Marc Dupré	Sophia-Rose Boulanger	Nessun Dorma - Luciano Pavarotti	36	39	75
12	Marc Dupré	Yvan Pedneault	Ordinaire - Robert Charlebois	34	48	82

==== Épisode 11 ====
At the start of the show, Mika sang with the 12 artists that were to perform on that night.

Order	Coach	Contestant	Song	Points (coach)	Points (audience)	Points (total)
1	Ariane Moffatt	Soran Dussaigne	Elle me dit - Mika	36	32	68
2	Ariane Moffatt	Elie Haroun	Stay With Me - Sam Smith	30	17	47
3	Ariane Moffatt	Noémie Lorzema	Si Dieu existe - Claude Dubois	34	51	85
4	Marc Dupré	Genevieve Leclerc	Une histoire d'amour - Mireille Mathieu	34	47	81
5	Marc Dupré	Jonny Arsenault	I Put a Spell on You - Screamin' Jay Hawkins	30	29	59
6	Marc Dupré	Mary-Pier Guilbault	Hymne à l'amour - Édith Piaf	36	24	60
7	Pierre Lapointe	Marielle Varin	Igloo - Safia Nolin	20	4	24
8	Pierre Lapointe	Sabrina Bellemare	Pour que tu m'aimes encore - Céline Dion	30	3	33
9	Pierre Lapointe	Stéphanie St-Jean	Oh Happy Day - Edwin Hawkins Singers	50	93	143
10	Éric Lapointe	Alexander Brown	Chu un rocker - Offenbach	29	8	37
11	Éric Lapointe	Marie-Ève Lapierre	Respect - Aretha Franklin	31	8	39
12	Éric Lapointe	Travis Cormier	Ailleurs - Marjo	40	84	124

=== Semifinals: Crossed-Battles ===
That year saw the introduction of the Crossed-Battles. Each coach had to pair each of his or her two remaining contestants to a singer from another team. The winner of the ''battle'' was determined only by public votes. In the end, the four singers who had the most points advanced on to the finals, no matter what team they were from.

At the start of the show, Marie-Mai sang with the 8 semi-finalists.

Order	Coach	Contestant	Song	Points (audience)
1	Ariane Moffatt	Noémie Lorzema (vs Beatrice)	Hello - Adele	73
2	Pierre Lapointe	Beatrice Keeler (vs Noémie)	Creep - Radiohead	27
3	Marc Dupré	Genevieve Leclerc (vs Travis)	Je suis malade - Lara Fabian	49
4	Éric Lapointe	Travis Cormier (vs Geneviève)	Bed of Roses - Bon Jovi	51
6	Ariane Moffatt	Amélie Nault (vs Yvan)	Repartir à zero - Joe Bocan	17
7	Marc Dupré	Yvan Pednault (vs Amélie)	Somebody to Love -Queen	83
7	Éric Lapointe	Markos Gonzalez Clemente (vs Stéphanie)	For me Formidable - Charles Aznavour	40
8	Pierre Lapointe	Stéphanie St-Jean (vs Markos)	Quand les hommes vivront d'amour - Raymond Lévesque	60

== Finals ==
DNCE, Alessia Cara and Kevin Bazinet, winner of the 3rd season of La Voix, among others, performed with the 4 finalists.

Stéphanie St-Jean from Team Pierre Lapointe won the title, obtaining 32% of popular vote.

Coach	Contestant	Percentage of votes	Song	Songwriter(s)	Results
Marc Dupré	Yvan Pedneault	22	La dernière fois	Marc Dupré, Nelson Minville	Third place
Pierre Lapointe	Stéphanie St-Jean	32	Ma Chambre	Pierre Lapointe	Winner
Éric Lapointe	Travis Cormier	31	Acadie Los Angeles	Éric Lapointe, Michel Rivard	Runner-up
Ariane Moffatt	Noémie Lozerna	15	Tout donner	Ariane Moffatt	Fourth place
