= La Voix season 6 =

2018 season of French-Canadian reality-TV series

La Voix
- Season 6
- Hosted by: Charles Lafortune
- Judges: Garou; Lara Fabian; Éric Lapointe; Alex Nevsky
- Winner: Yama Laurent
- Runner-up: Miriam Baghdassarian

Release
- Original network: TVA
- Original release: February 11 – May 6, 2018

Season chronology
- ← Previous; Season 5 Next → Season 7

La Voix is the French Canadian version of the Dutch reality vocal competition created by John de Mol The Voice of Holland. Season 6 of La Voix was broadcast in 2018 on TVA and was hosted for a sixth consecutive season by Charles Lafortune. Éric Lapointe was the only coach returning from the previous season, with Garou, Lara Fabian and Alex Nevsky replacing Marc Dupré, Pierre Lapointe and Isabelle Boulay of the previous season.

== Season ==
=== Live Shows ===
From this stage on, all shows were broadcast live.

Contestant saved
Contestant eliminated

==== Episode 10 ====
At the beginning of the episode, Marc Dupré joined all 12 finalists in a collective song

Order	Coach	Contestant	Songs	Points (coach)	Points (audience)	Points (total)
1	Garou	Chloé Doyon	The Greatest - Sia	34	24	58
2	Garou	Sami Chaouki	Femme Like U - K-Maro	31	5	36
3	Garou	Yama Laurent	Ils s'aiment - Daniel Lavoie	35	71	106
4	Lara Fabian	Jean-Alexandre Boisclair	Hymne à l'amour - Édith Piaf	32	14	46
5	Lara Fabian	Miriam Baghdassarian	Take Me to Church - Hozier	35	54	89
6	Lara Fabian	Redgee	Si seulement je pouvais lui manquer - Calogero	33	32	65
7	Éric Lapointe	Cherylyn Toca	Les feuilles mortes - Yves Montand	31	26	57
8	Éric Lapointe	Jesse Proteau	Impossible - Shontelle	35	26	61
9	Éric Lapointe	Karine Labelle	Une chance qu'on s'a - Jean-Pierre Ferland	34	48	82
10	Alex Nevsky	Cherry Lena	I Put a Spell on You - Screamin' Jay Hawkins	35	23	58
11	Alex Nevsky	Édouard Lagacé	Il y a tant à faire - Daniel Bélanger	32	41	73
12	Alex Nevsky	Mario Cyr	Enfant de l'asphalte - Koriass	33	36	69

==== Episode 11 ====
At the beginning of the episode, Serena Ryder sang collectively with the 12 finalists of the show.

Order	Coach	Contestant	Song	Points (coach)	Points (audience)	Points (total)
1	Alex Nevsky	Antoine Lachance	La saison des pluies - Patrice Michaud	35	11	46
2	Alex Nevsky	Ben Alexander	Chandelier - Sia	32	8	40
3	Alex Nevsky	Yann Brassard	Alors on danse- Stromae	33	81	114
4	Garou	Carl Miguel Maldonado	Caruso - Lucio Dalla	32	14	46
5	Garou	Jordane Labrie	Le pénitencier - Johnny Hallyday	33	22	55
6	Garou	Samuel Babineau	You Found Me - The Fray	35	64	99
7	Lara Fabian	Elodie Bégin	Le blues du businessman - Starmania/Claude Dubois	30	16	46
8	Lara Fabian	Félix Lemelin	Angel - Sarah McLachlan	38	40	78
9	Lara Fabian	Kelly Bado	S'il suffisait d'aimer - Céline Dion	32	44	76
10	Éric Lapointe	Alex Météore	De la chambre au salon - Harmonium	27	3	30
11	Éric Lapointe	Jonathan Freeman	Fade - Lewis Capaldi	35	62	97
12	Éric Lapointe	Stéphanie Veillette	Amoureuse - Marjo	38	35	73

=== Semi-final ===
At the start of the show, Roch Voisine sang with the 8 semi-finalists.

Order	Coach	Contestant	Song	Points (audience)
1	Lara Fabian	Félix Lemelin	"When We Were Young" - Adele	24
2	Lara Fabian	Miriam Baghdassarian	Il est où le bonheur - Christophe Maé	76
3	Éric Lapointe	Jonathan Freeman	"La voix que j'ai" - Offenbach	59
4	Éric Lapointe	Karine Labelle	"I Don't Want to Miss a Thing" - Aerosmith	41
5	Alex Nevsky	Édouard Lagacé	"On s'est aimé à cause" - Céline Dion	38
6	Alex Nevsky	Yann Brassard	"Superstition" - Stevie Wonder	62
7	Garou	Samuel Babineau	"La Ballade de Jean Batailleur" - Zachary Richard	27
8	Garou	Yama Laurent	"A Change Is Gonna Come" - Sam Cooke	73

== Finals ==
Yama Laurent from Team Garou won the title, obtaining 60% of popular vote.

Coach	Contestant	Percentage of votes	Song	Songwriter(s)	Results
Lara Fabian	Miriam Baghdassarian	20	"Je veux donner"	Lara Fabian	Second place
Éric Lapointe	Jonathan Freeman	7	"Ouvre-moi"	Éric Lapointe, Michel Rivard, Stéphane Dufour	Fourth place
Alex Nevsky	Yann Brassard	13	"Amanda"	Jonathan Harnois, Alex Nevsky, Yann Perreau, Yann Brassard	Third place
Garou	Yama Laurent	60	"Un peu de nous"	Garou, David Nathan	Winner
