= La Voix season 7 =

2019 season of French-Canadian reality-TV series

La Voix
- Season 7
- Hosted by: Charles Lafortune
- Judges: Marc Dupré; Lara Fabian; Éric Lapointe; Alex Nevsky
- Winner: Geneviève Jodoin
- Runner-up: Colin Moore

Release
- Original network: TVA
- Original release: February 10 – May 5, 2019

Season chronology
- ← Previous; Season 6

La Voix is the French Canadian version of the Dutch reality vocal competition created by John de Mol The Voice of Holland . Season 7 of La Voix is being broadcast in 2019 on TVA and is hosted for a seventh consecutive season by Charles Lafortune. Éric Lapointe, Alex Nevsky and Lara Fabian remain as coaches from season 6 with Marc Dupré returning as coach to replace Garou of the previous season.

This season, the "blocked" button was added for the first time. Each coach, in addition to the famous red button would have three small buttons with the names of the three other coaches. If a coach really desires having a certain candidate in his/her team and fears that the candidate may be picked by another coach, he/she can block that specific coach from actually pressing his red button for him/her. Coaches can only use this right for a single time during the blind audition segment of the season. However, the practice of using of mentor coaches during the duels was discontinued. Instead a "super coach" serving in similar series in another country would be invited to help the coaches and their contestants in preparing their songs in the period following the blind auditions. Also, four personalities would become "honorary members" of each team, and would prepare a joint song with their respective teams during the final.

The honorary members were Corey Hart on Éric Lapointe's team, Michael Bolton on Lara Fabian's, Lewis Capaldi on Marc Dupré's, and Édith Butler on Alex Nevsky's. Hart introduced the change with a stunt appearance in which he performed his own hit single "Everything in My Heart" as a blind auditioner before revealing the true purpose of his appearance; the other three honorary members were simply introduced to the competition in a more conventional manner.

== Season ==
=== Live Shows ===
From this stage on, all shows were broadcast live.

Contestant saved
Contestant eliminated
