= La Voix season 5 =

2017 season of French-Canadian reality-TV series

La Voix
- Season 5
- Hosted by: Charles Lafortune
- Judges: Isabelle Boulay; Marc Dupré; Éric Lapointe; Pierre Lapointe
- Winner: Ludovick Bourgeois
- Runner-up: Rebecca Noelle

Release
- Original network: TVA
- Original release: February 12 – May 7, 2017

Season chronology
- ← Previous; Season 4 Next → Season 6

La Voix is the French Canadian version of the Dutch reality vocal competition created by John de Mol The Voice of Holland . Season 5 of La Voix was broadcast in 2017 on TVA and was hosted for a fifth consecutive season by Charles Lafortune. Éric Lapointe, Marc Dupré and Pierre Lapointe season 4 judges all returned, whereas fourth season judge Ariane Moffatt was replaced by Isabelle Boulay, who returned after a one-season hiatus.

== Season ==
=== Les chants de bataille (Knockouts) ===
==== Episode 9 ====
Contestant saved
Contestant eliminated

After les Duels, each team consisted of eight contestants. The team coach would select five to go straight to the Live Shows, whereas the remaining three on his/her team would be in danger of elimination. Each contestant would sing a self-chosen song, with the coach having the option of saving only one to join his other 5 in the Live Shows for a resulting final 6 in each team. The other two are eliminated from the competition.

Order	Coach	Contestant	Song
1	Pierre Lapointe	Joëlle Miller	Parce qu'on vient de loin - Corneille
2	Pierre Lapointe	Sam Tucker	Kansas City - Little Richard / Fats Domino
3	Pierre Lapointe	Sebastian Roel	S.O.S. d'un terrien en détresse - Starmania/Daniel Balavoine
4	Marc Dupré	Annabel Oreste	Ma philosophie - Amel Bent
5	Marc Dupré	Jay Lavigne	Crier tout bas - Cœur de Pirate
6	Marc Dupré	Rebecca Noelle	Who's Lovin' You - The Jackson 5
7	Isabelle Boulay	Alexandre Farina	Love Me... Please Love Me... - Michel Polnareff
8	Isabelle Boulay	Amos J.	Walking in Memphis - Marc Cohn
9	Isabelle Boulay	Annie Gaudreau-Roy	Les feuilles mortes - Yves Montand
10	Éric Lapointe	Andy Bastarache	Somebody Like You - Keith Urban
11	Éric Lapointe	Athena Holmes	Je veux tout - Ariane Moffatt
12	Éric Lapointe	Elyann Quessy	Dis tout sans rien dire - Daniel Bélanger

=== Live Shows ===
Starting with this stage, all shows were broadcast live.

Contestant saved
Contestant eliminated

==== Episode 10 ====
At the beginning of the episode, Birdy sang collectively with the 12 finalists.

Order	Coach	Contestant	Song	Points (coach)	Points (audience)	Points (total)
1	Éric Lapointe	Andy Bastarache	Moman - Éric Lapointe	32	33	65
2	Éric Lapointe	Guy Mapoko	Je chante comme un coyote - Offenbach	29	5	34
3	Éric Lapointe	Ludovick Bourgeois	Faithfully - Journey	39	62	101
4	Marc Dupré	Brandon Mignacca	En apesanteur - Calogero	32	14	46
5	Marc Dupré	Rebecca Noelle	Solitude - Lulu Hughes	35	49	84
6	Marc Dupré	Tova Stolow	Stone Cold - Demi Lovato	33	37	70
7	Isabelle Boulay	Abigail Galwey	La marée haute - Lhasa de Sela	30	8	38
8	Isabelle Boulay	Frank Williams	T'envoler - Paul Daraîche	32	52	84
9	Isabelle Boulay	Marilyne Léonard-Thiffault	All I Want - Kodaline	38	40	78
10	Pierre Lapointe	David Marino	Quand ça balance - Michel Legrand	40	61	101
11	Pierre Lapointe	Karimah Marshall	Y'a de l'amour dans l'air - Martine St-Clair	25	8	33
12	Pierre Lapointe	Mike Valletta	Counting Stars - OneRepublic	35	31	66

==== Episode 11 ====
At the beginning of the episode, Zaz sang collectively with the 12 finalists.

Order	Coach	Contestant	Song	Points (coach)	Points (audience)	Points (total)
1	Marc Dupré	Margau	Let It Go - James Bay	37	42	79
2	Marc Dupré	Maxime Desrosiers	Je suis cool - Gilles Valiquette	30	11	41
3	Marc Dupré	Michaël	Aimons-nous - Yvon Deschamps	33	47	80
4	Pierre Lapointe	Hanorah	Mon cœur pour te garder - Noëlle Cordier	33	18	51
5	Pierre Lapointe	Sam Tucker	Down in Mexico - The Coasters	35	70	105
6	Pierre Lapointe	Zaya Solange	Papaoutai - Stromae	32	12	44
7	Éric Lapointe	Cindy Daniel	Me and Bobby McGee - Janis Joplin	32	14	46
8	Éric Lapointe	Désirée	Tu m'aimes-tu - Richard Desjardins	35	56	91
9	Éric Lapointe	Jean-Seb Carré	Chasse-Galerie - Claude Dubois	33	30	63
10	Isabelle Boulay	Amos J.	Your Song - Elton John	30	24	54
11	Isabelle Boulay	Louis-Paul Gauvreau	L'abîme du rêve - Incandescence	36	52	88
12	Isabelle Boulay	Willis Pride	Juste une p'tite nuite - Les Colocs	34	24	58

=== Semi-final ===
At the start of the show, Safia Nolin sang with the 8 semi-finalists.

Order	Coach	Contestant	Song	Points (audience)
1	Pierre Lapointe	David Marino	"L.O.V.E." - Nat King Cole	56
2	Pierre Lapointe	Sam Tucker	"Toxic" - Britney Spears	44
3	Isabelle Boulay	Frank Williams	"On jase de toi" - Noir Silence	52
4	Isabelle Boulay	Louis-Paul Gauvreau	"Hurt" - Nine Inch Nails	48
5	Éric Lapointe	Désirée	"Je n't'aime plus" - Mario Pelchat	29
6	Éric Lapointe	Ludovick Bourgeois	"Drops of Jupiter" - Train	71
7	Marc Dupré	Michaël	"L'escalier" - Paul Piché	41
8	Marc Dupré	Rebecca Noelle	"The Power of Love" - Frankie Goes to Hollywood	59

== Finals ==
Ludovick Bourgeois from Team Éric Lapointe won the title, obtaining 50% of popular vote.

Coach	Contestant	Percentage of votes	Song	Songwriter(s)	Results
Marc Dupré	Rebecca Noelle	22	"Promets-moi"	Marc Dupré, Frédérick Baron, John Nathaniel	Second place
Isabelle Boulay	Frank Williams	11	"Sur la terre des musiciens"	Paul Daraîche, Nelson Minville	Fourth place
Pierre Lapointe	David Marino	17	"Amour ou songe"	Pierre Lapointe	Third place
Éric Lapointe	Ludovick Bourgeois	50	"Si je commençais"	Éric Lapointe, Lynda Lemay, Stéphane Dufour	Winner
