= Brandon Mig =

Canadian pop singer

Brandon Mig is the stage name of Brandon Mignacca, a Canadian pop singer from Laval, Quebec. He is most noted for his debut single "Best I'll Never Have", which was released in both English and French versions and received a SOCAN Songwriting Prize nomination for its French version in 2019.

Mignacca first emerged as a competitor in the fifth season of La Voix in 2017, competing on Marc Dupré's team. Although he did not win the competition, Dupré continued to support him as he established his career, culminating in the release of "Best I'll Never Have" in 2018. The song's French version was more successful on the charts than the English, reaching #3 on Quebec's pop charts and becoming one of the most-played songs across all Quebec radio stations in summer 2018.

Mignacca has also appeared as a guest vocalist on material by other artists, including Leo Lauretti and Noar on the 2019 single "Gravity", and A.M.R on "Fell Out of Love", part of the 2020 album A Place for Everything.
