= Bazinet =

Bazinet is a surname. Notable people with the surname include:

- Bobby Bazinet, known as Bobby Bazini (born 1989), French Canadian singer-songwriter
- Camille Leblanc-Bazinet (born 1988), Canadian CrossFit Games athlete
- Charles Bazinet (1845–1916), Canadian politician
- Kevin Bazinet (born 1991), Canadian singer, winner of reality TV series La Voix
- Pierre "Baz" Bazinet (born 1956), Canadian record producer
- René Bazinet (born 1955), German-Canadian clown, mime, and stage and film actor

== See also ==
- Lac-Bazinet, Quebec, an unorganized territory in the Laurentides region of Quebec, Canada
