= Matt Holubowski =

Canadian singer-songwriter

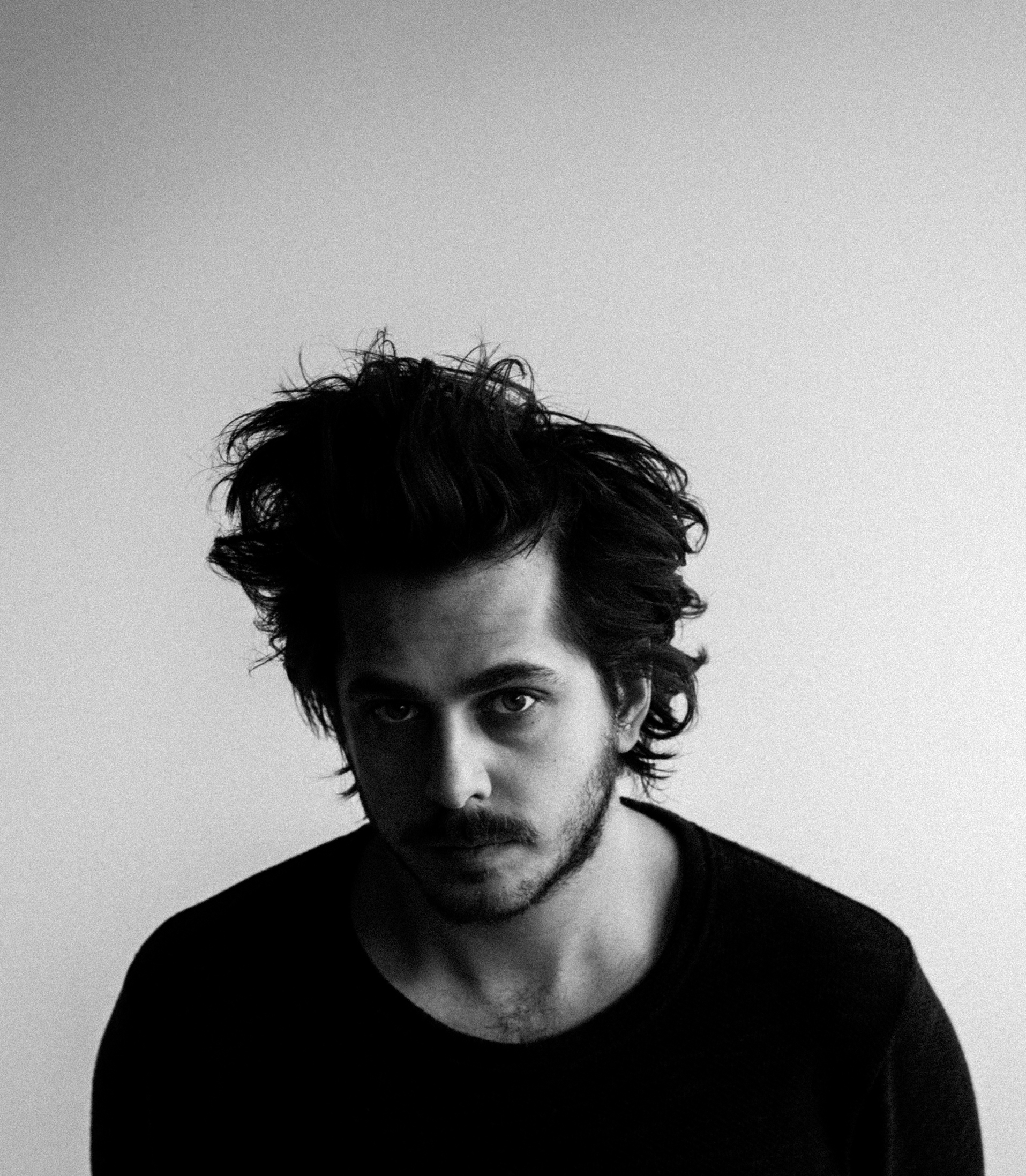

Background information
- Born: 9 May 1988 (age 38); Hudson, Quebec, Canada
- Instruments: Vocals, guitar, ukulele, mandolin, harmonica
- Labels: Audiogram, Motor Music, Yotonka
- Website: mattholubowski.com

Matt Holubowski is a Canadian singer-songwriter from Hudson, Quebec. A fluently bilingual performer of mixed Polish and Québécois descent, he writes and sings material in both English and French.

After releasing his debut album Ogen, Old Man independently in 2014, he competed on the third season of TVA's music competition series La Voix in 2015, auditioning with Ray LaMontagne's song "Burn". Although he made it to the finals, he lost the final audience vote to Kevin Bazinet. He released his second album, Solitudes, in 2016 on Audiogram, and has supported the album with extensive touring in Quebec, select dates in English Canada, and a tour of Europe as an opening act for Ben Folds. In 2017, he followed up with the three-song EP Epilogue, which was released both on its own and as bonus tracks on a new expanded edition of Solitudes.

== Discography ==
- Ogen, Old Man (2014)
- Solitudes (2016)
- Solitudes (Epilogue) (2017)
- Weird Ones (2020)
- Like Flowers on a Molten Lawn (2023)
