= Yoan Garneau =

Canadian singer (born 1995)

Yoan
- Born: Yoan Garneau; May 10, 1995 (age 31); Ferme-Neuve, Quebec
- Genres: Pop, rock, country
- Occupations: Singer, songwriter
- Years active: 2014–present
- Website: www.yoan.mu/en

Yoan Garneau, also known as Yoan, (born May 10, 1995) is a Canadian pop, rock and country singer from Ferme-Neuve, Quebec. The winner of Season 2 of the reality television series La Voix in 2014, he released his self-titled debut album in 2015.

Garneau's father Sylvain is a country musician. Before his original audition for La Voix, Garneau had difficulty deciding whether to audition with an original song or a cover of Billy Joe Shaver's "Live Forever", deciding only at the last minute to go with the Shaver cover.

His debut album Yoan, released on March 25, 2015, features duets with Isabelle Boulay, his coach on La Voix, and country singer Brett Kissel. The album features material in both English and French, mixing both original compositions and covers; its lead single is a cover of Jimmy Reed's "Baby What You Want Me to Do".

The album debuted at #1 on Billboard's Canadian Albums Chart for the week of April 11, 2015, retaining that spot for the weeks of April 18 and April 25. In its first two months of release, the album sold approximately 90,000 copies.

== Discography ==
=== Albums ===
Title	Album details	Peak positions	Certification	Sales
Title	Album details	CAN	Certification	Sales
Yoan	Release date: March 25, 2015; Label: Productions J	1	MC: Platinum	CAN: 110,000
Depuis longtemps	Release date: March 23, 2018; Label: Self-released	11		

== Awards and nominations ==
Year	Association	Category	Result
2015	Canadian Country Music Association	Top Selling Canadian Album — Yoan	Won

Awards and achievements
Preceded by Valérie Carpentier	La Voix Winner; 2014	Succeeded by Kevin Bazinet
