= Josiane =

Josiane is a feminine name of Hebrew origin. It's a derivation of the name Joseph. It was first officially recorded in France, in 1909.

== List of people with the given name ==
- Josiane Balasko (born 1950), French actress, writer and director
- Josiane Comeau (born 2000 or 2001), also known mononymously as Josiane, Canadian singer
- Josiane Corneloup (born 1959), French politician
- Josiane Nunes (born 1993), Brazilian mixed martial artist
- Josiane Serre (1922-2004), French academic chemist
- Josiane Shen, Luxembourgish television presenter
- Josiane Stoléru, French actress
- Josiane Tito (born 1979), Brazilian sprinter

== See also ==
- Josie (name)
- Josiah (given name)
