= Marie-Ève Laure =

Canadian folk-pop singer-songwriter

Marie-Ève Laure is the stage name of Marie-Ève Lapierre-Lemoyne, a Canadian folk-pop singer-songwriter from Sainte-Thérèse, Quebec, who won the Canadian Folk Music Award for French Songwriter of the Year for her album Onze at the 16th Canadian Folk Music Awards in 2021.

As Marie-Ève Lapierre, she competed in the fourth season of La Voix in 2016, being eliminated from the competition in episode 11.

She released Onze, her debut album, in 2019. In addition to her French Songwriter of the Year win at the CFMAs, she was also a nominee for New/Emerging Artist of the Year, and for the Félix Award for Country Album of the Year at the 42nd Felix Awards.
