= Bobby Bazini =

French Canadian musician

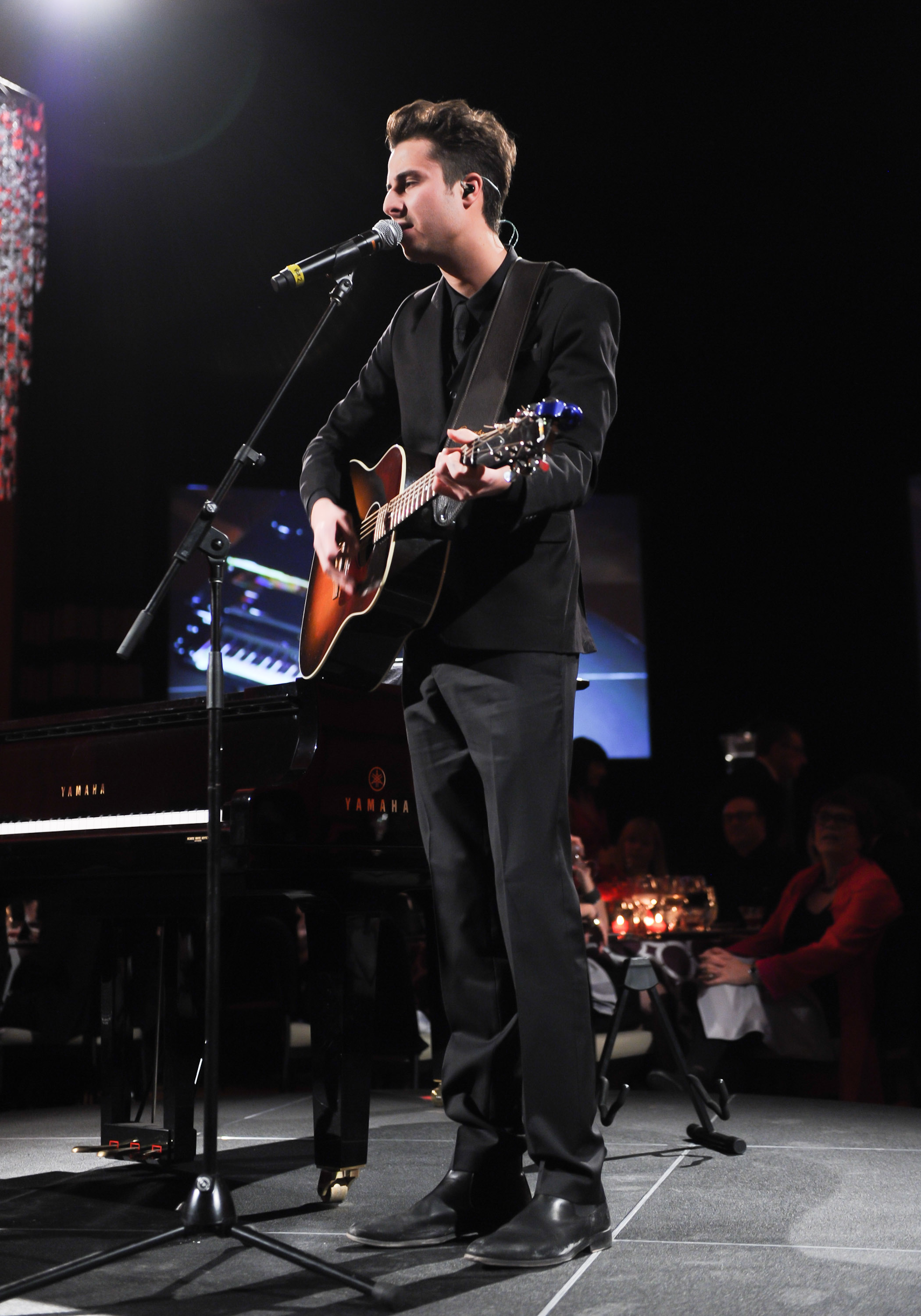
- Bazini performing at the 2014 Music & Movies: CFC Gala & Auction Fundraiser 2014

Background information
- Born: Bobby Bazinet; May 6, 1989 (age 37); Mont-Laurier, Quebec, Canada
- Genres: Folk, soul
- Instruments: Vocals, guitar, harmonica
- Years active: 2009–present
- Label: Universal Music Canada
- Website: bobbybazini.com

Bobby Bazini (born Bobby Bazinet May 6, 1989) is a French Canadian singer-songwriter from Mont-Laurier, Quebec, Canada. He has released three studio albums and is currently signed to Universal Music Canada.

== Career ==
=== 2009–2011: Better In Time ===
Bazini's first single, "I Wonder", was released in 2009 and stayed eight weeks on the Top 3 of ADISQ. His debut album, Better In Time (2010), peaked at No. 4 on the Canadian Albums Chart and was certified platinum by the CRIA with over 80,000 copies sold. Warner Music Group subsequently acquired the rights to his album and distributed it internationally.

In 2011, Bazini was nominated for two Juno Awards: New Artist of the Year and Pop Album of the Year (Better In Time).

=== 2012–2014: Where I Belong ===
When the time came to craft his second album, Bobby Bazini took the trip of a lifetime when he grabbed his guitar, loaded up his car, and left a small Montreal suburb for California to record with music producer Larry Klein. Where I Belong (2014) was recorded with some of Bazini's favorite musicians, including Booker T. Jones (organ), Jack Ashford (percussion), and Jay Bellerose (drums), which resulted in an album of live-sounding folk/country and soul songs, released through Universal Music Canada.

Where I Belong topped the charts in Canada and was certified platinum with more than 100,000 copies sold, reaching this threshold within the year of release, making it the best-selling Canadian album of 2014.

In June 2014, Bazini performed at the Montreal International Jazz Festival to an audience of approximately 60,000.

=== 2015–present: Summer Is Gone ===
For his third studio album, Summer Is Gone (2016), Bazini worked with songwriters and producers like Jake Gosling (Ed Sheeran), Martin Terefe (Jason Mraz, James Blunt), and Eg White (James Morrison, Adele). Pop Magazine lists Summer Is Gone among the Top 50 Albums of 2016.

Bazini performed at the Stanley Cup 125th Tribute Concert in Ottawa, Ontario, on March 17, 2017.

== Family ==
In 2015, his younger brother Kevin Bazinet won the third season of the reality television competition La Voix.

== Discography ==
=== Albums ===
| Year | Album details | Peak | Certifications | Sales |
| Year | Album details | CAN | Certifications | Sales |
|---|---|---|---|---|
| 2010 | Better In Time: Release: March 9, 2010; Label: Warner; Format: CD, digital download | 4 | MC: Platinum | CAN: 80,000 |
| 2014 | Where I Belong: Release: May 27, 2014; Label: Universal; Format: CD, digital download | 1 | MC: Platinum | CAN: 102,000 |
| 2016 | Summer Is Gone: Release: November 11, 2016; Label: Universal; Format: CD, digital download | 2 | | |
| 2020 | Move Away: Release: August 14, 2020; Label: Universal; Format: CD, Vinyl, digital download | 42 | | |
| 2023 | Pearl: Release: August 25, 2023; Label: Spectra Musique; Format: CD, Vinyl, digital download | | | |

=== Singles ===
| Year | Single | Peak | | Album |
| Year | Single | CAN | ADISQ | Album |
|---|---|---|---|---|
| 2009 | "I Wonder" | — | 3 | Better In Time |
| 2013 | "Cold Cold Heart" | — | — | Where I Belong |
| 2016 | "C'est la vie" | 72 | — | Summer Is Gone |
"—" denotes releases that did not chart

== Awards and nominations ==
| Year | Award | Category | Nominee/work | Result | Ref. |
|---|---|---|---|---|---|
| 2011 | Juno Awards | New Artist of the Year | Bobby Bazini | Nominated | |
| 2011 | Juno Awards | Pop Album of the Year | Better In Time | Nominated | |
