= La Voix =

French Canadian reality talent show

- Genre: Talent show
- Created by: John de Mol Jr.
- Presented by: Charles Lafortune
- Judges: Marc Dupré; Jean-Pierre Ferland; Marie-Mai; Ariane Moffatt; Isabelle Boulay; Louis-Jean Cormier; Éric Lapointe; Pierre Lapointe; Lara Fabian; Garou; Alex Nevsky; Cœur de pirate; Corneille; Marjo; Mario Pelchat; Roxane Bruneau; France D'Amour
- Country of origin: Canada
- Original language: French
- No. of seasons: 11

Production
- Production locations: Montreal, Quebec
- Running time: 60–120 minutes
- Production companies: Productions Déferlantes; Talpa (2012–2019); ITV Studios (2020–present)

Original release
- Network: TVA
- Release: 20 January 2013 – present

La Voix (French pronunciation: [la vwa]) is a francophone Canadian reality talent show as part of the international television series franchise The Voice, based on the original Dutch version of the program created by John de Mol Jr. The series is part of The Voice franchise and is based on a similar competition format in The Netherlands entitled The Voice of Holland. The series is structured into three phases: blind auditions, battles, and live performance shows. In 2016, La Voix also launched a separate series for younger contestants called La Voix Junior.

== Format ==
=== Producers' Auditions and The Blind Auditions ===
The first stage of La Voix is the producer's auditions, which are not shown on television. The first televised stage is the blind auditions, where the contestants sing in front of the coaches. The coaches have their backs to the singer and if they like what they hear; they can press their button to turn around and recruit them to their team. If more than one coach turns the power shifts to the singer, who then decides which team they would like to be part of. Each coach must recruit 12 singers to their team in the blind auditions to progress onto the battle phase. Starting on season seven, a new twist is added, the 'block'. Each coach can press the button with the name of another coach to avoid that coach from getting an artist.

=== The Duels: Top 48 ===
The Duels oppose two participants from the same team. To prepare, participants are helped and advised not only by their coach but also by mentors. After the duet performance, the coach determines the participant who will move on to the next stage. The other coaches will be able to steal an unsuccessful candidate. They can only use this privilege twice. At the end of the Duels, each team will have 8 participants.

=== The Chants de Bataille: Top 32 ===
Among the eight artists composing their teams, the coaches will choose five participants who will go directly to the Directs. The other three will have to go through the Chants de Bataille stage to access Directs. Only one will succeed.

=== The Directs ===
At the four Directs, from the quarterfinals to the Grand Final, the audience and the coaches determine who will continue the competition.

=== Final: Top 4 ===
At this stage, there are only 4 participants left to become the big winner of the series. The audience will have the choice, and it is he/she alone who will vote to determine La Voix.

== Coaches and hosts ==
| Coach | Season | | | | | | | | | | |
| Coach | 1 | 2 | 3 | 4 | 5 | 6 | 7 | 8 | 9 | 10 | 11 |
|---|---|---|---|---|---|---|---|---|---|---|---|
| Marc Dupré | | | | | | | | | | | |
| Ariane Moffatt | | | | | | | | | | | |
| Jean-Pierre Ferland | | | | | | | | | | | |
| Marie-Mai | | | | | | | | | | | |
| Éric Lapointe | | | | | | | | | | | |
| Isabelle Boulay | | | | | | | | | | | |
| Louis-Jean Cormier | | | | | | | | | | | |
| Pierre Lapointe | | | | | | | | | | | |
| Lara Fabian | | | | | | | | | | | |
| Alex Nevsky | | | | | | | | | | | |
| Garou | | | | | | | | | | | |
| Cœur de pirate | | | | | | | | | | | |
| Corneille | | | | | | | | | | | |
| Mario Pelchat | | | | | | | | | | | |
| Marjo | | | | | | | | | | | |
| Roxane Bruneau | | | | | | | | | LDV | | |
| France D'Amour | | | | | | | | | | | |

| Host | Seasons | | | | | | | | | | |
| Host | 1 | 2 | 3 | 4 | 5 | 6 | 7 | 8 | 9 | 10 | 11 |
|---|---|---|---|---|---|---|---|---|---|---|---|
| Charles Lafortune | | | | | | | | | | | |

Coaches' gallery

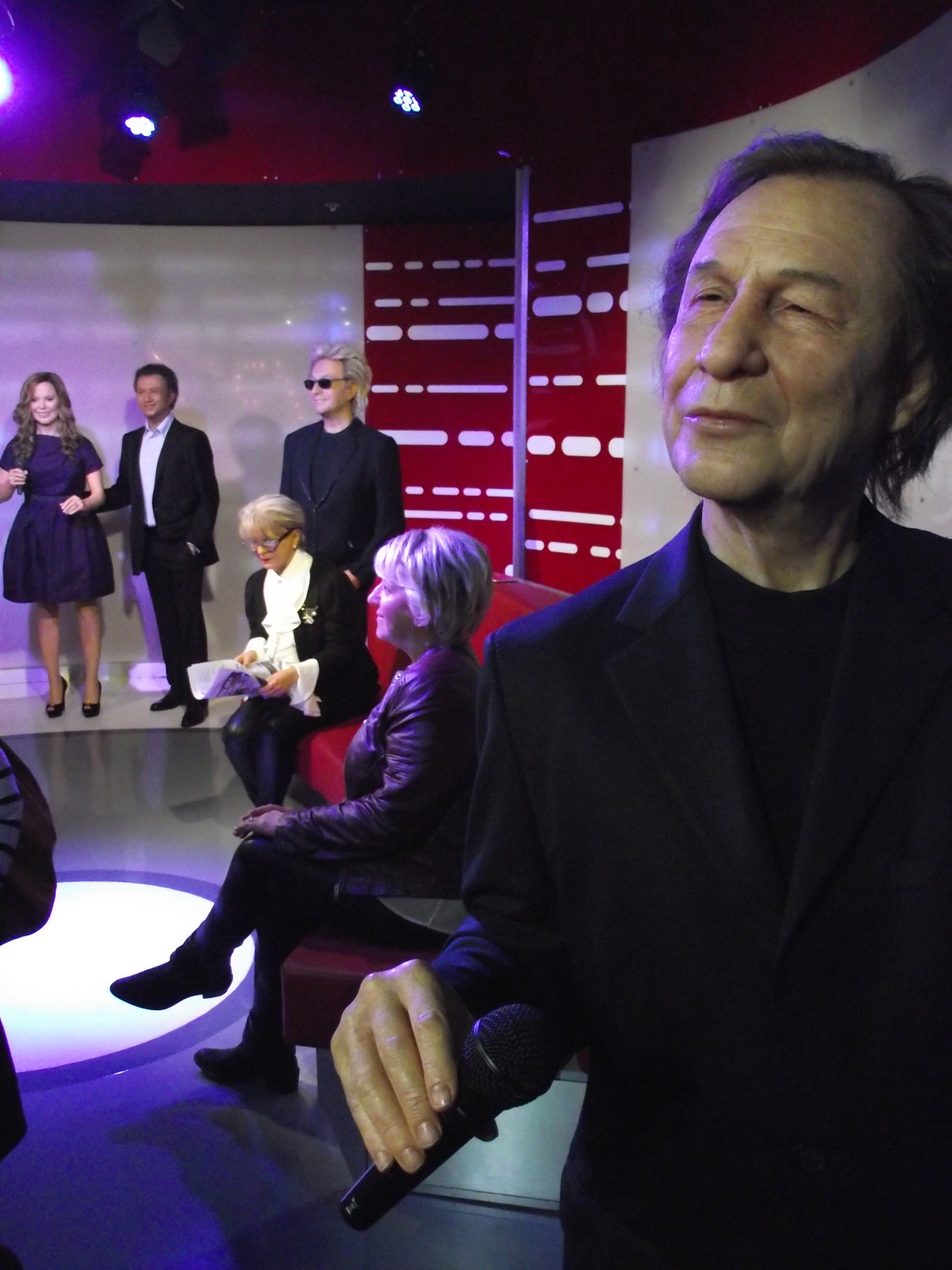
Jean-Pierre Ferland (2013)

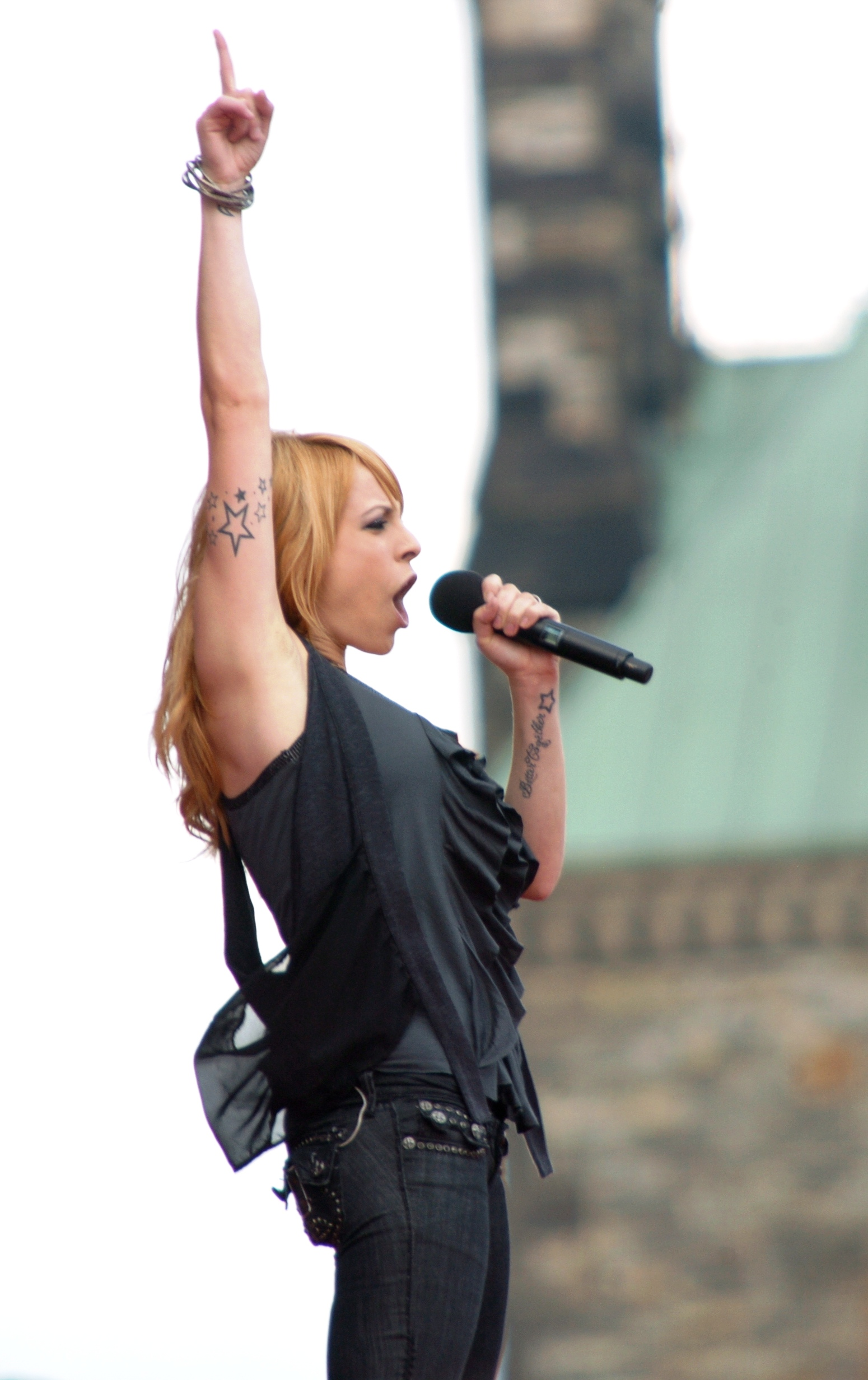
Marie-Mai (2013)

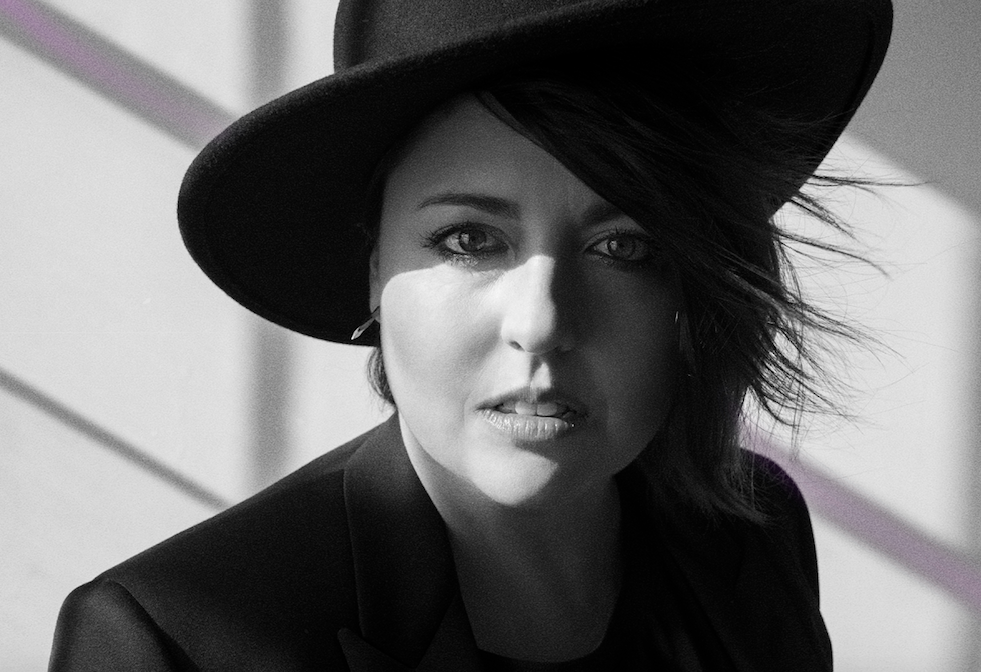
Ariane Moffatt (2013, 2016)

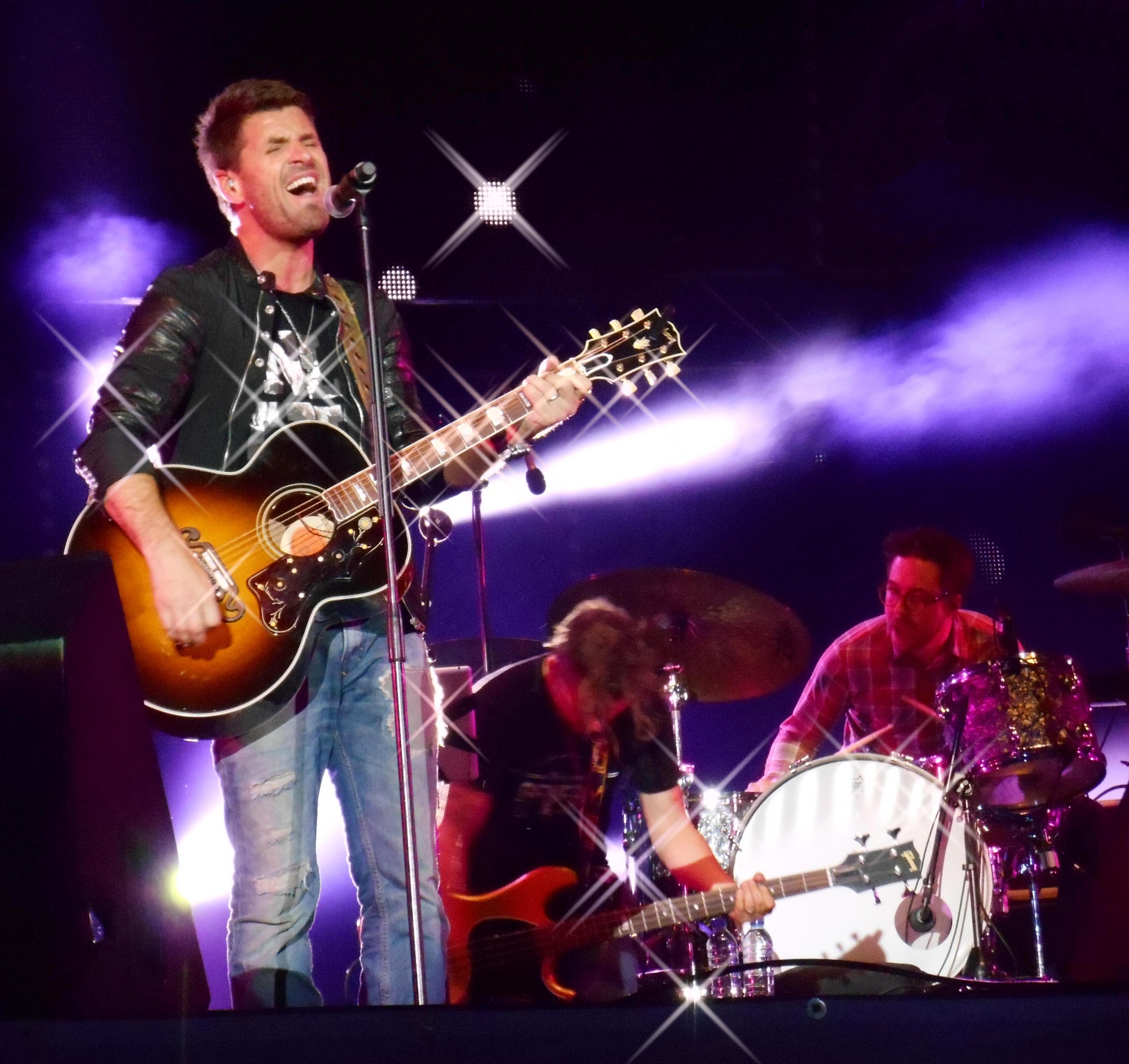
Marc Dupré (2013–2017, 2019–2020, 2023)

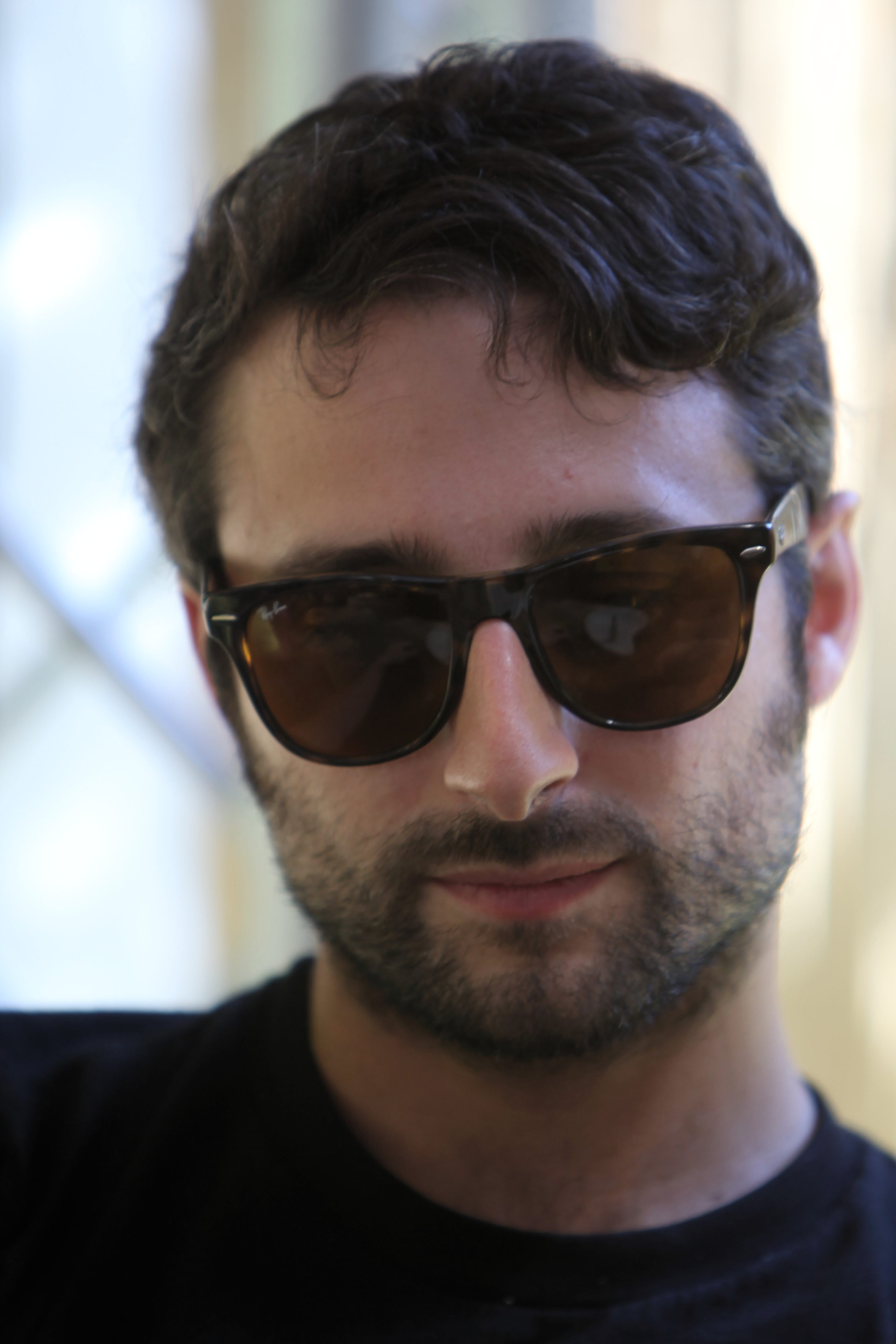
Louis-Jean Cormier (2014)

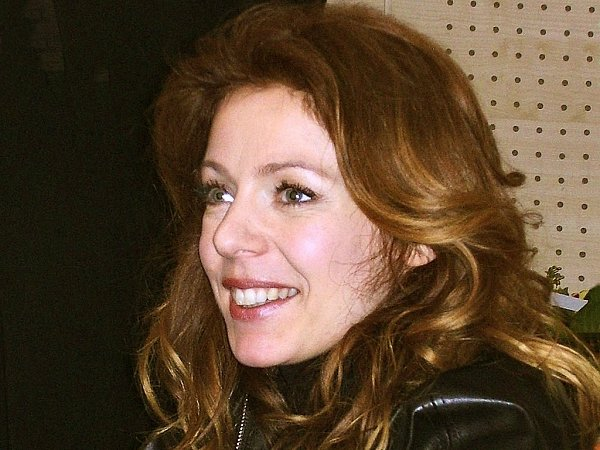
Isabelle Boulay (2014–2015, 2017)

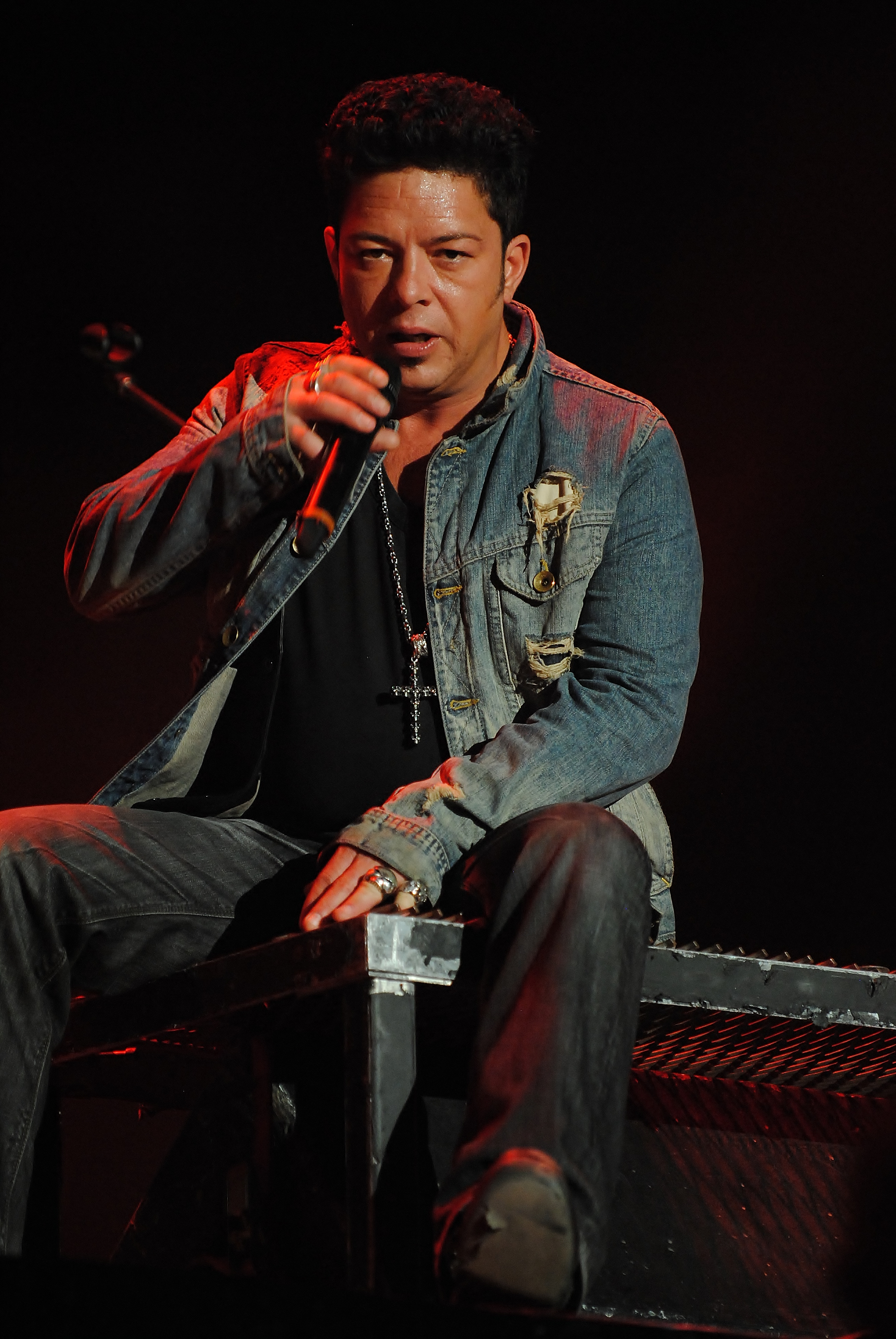
Éric Lapointe (2014–2019)

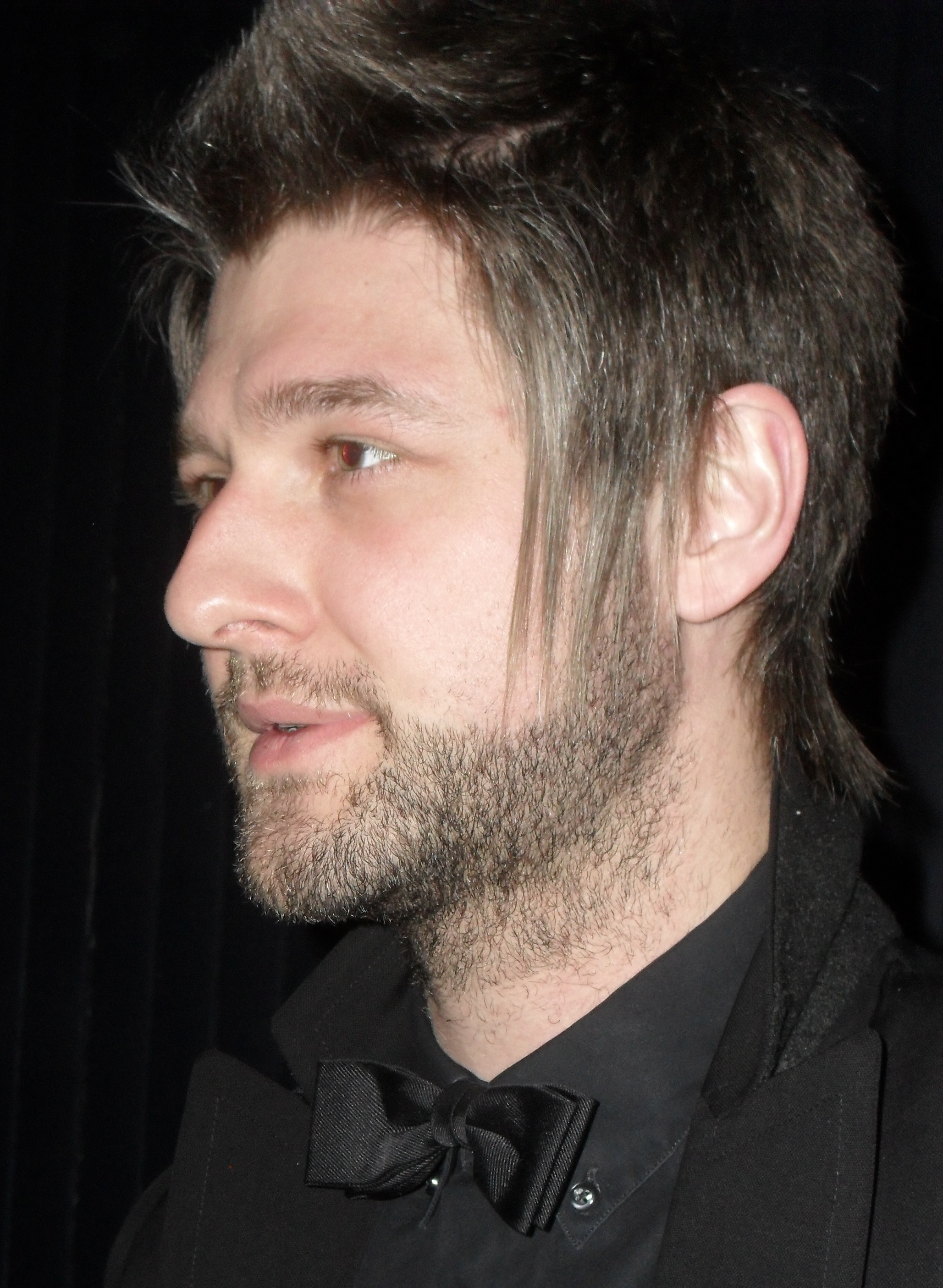
Pierre Lapointe (2015–2017, 2020)

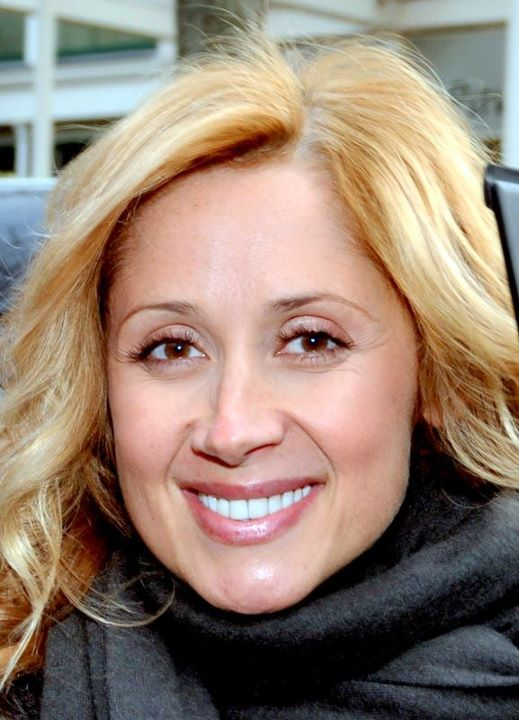
Lara Fabian (2018–2019)

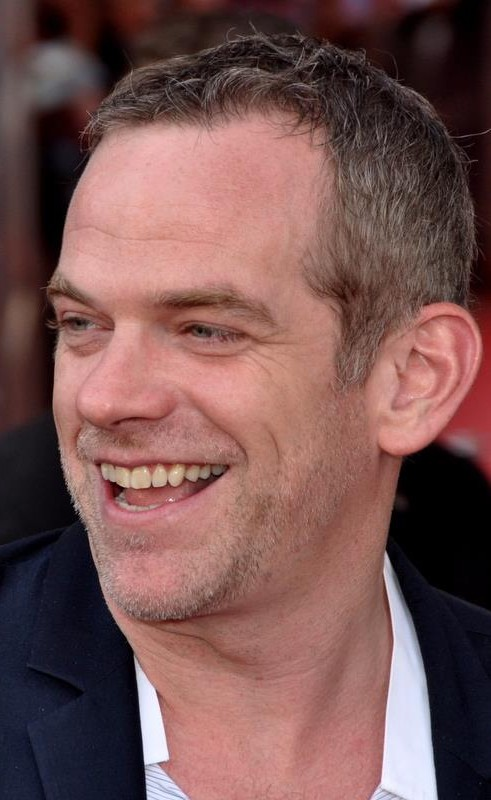
Garou (2018, 2020)

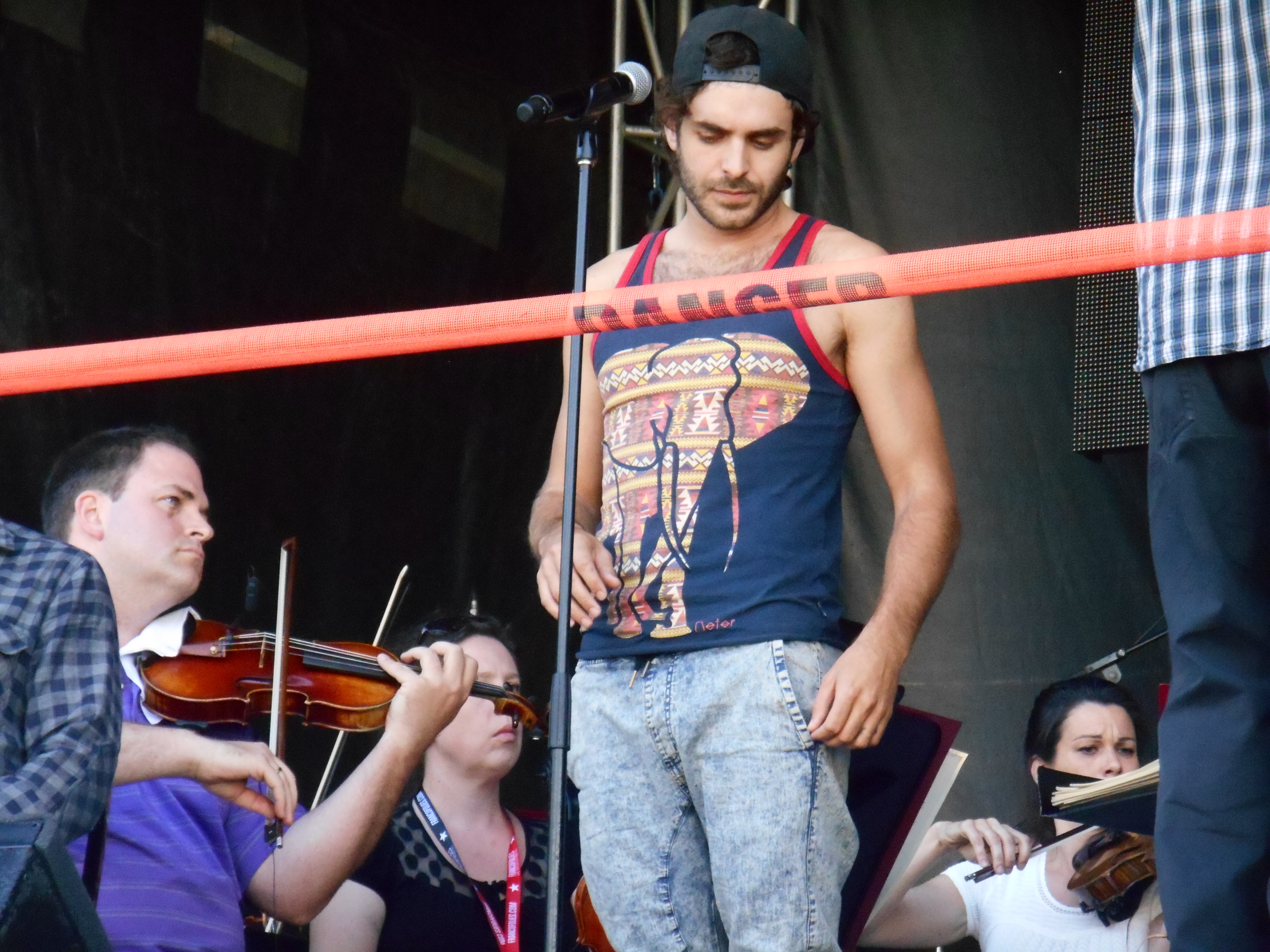
Alex Nevsky (2018–2019)

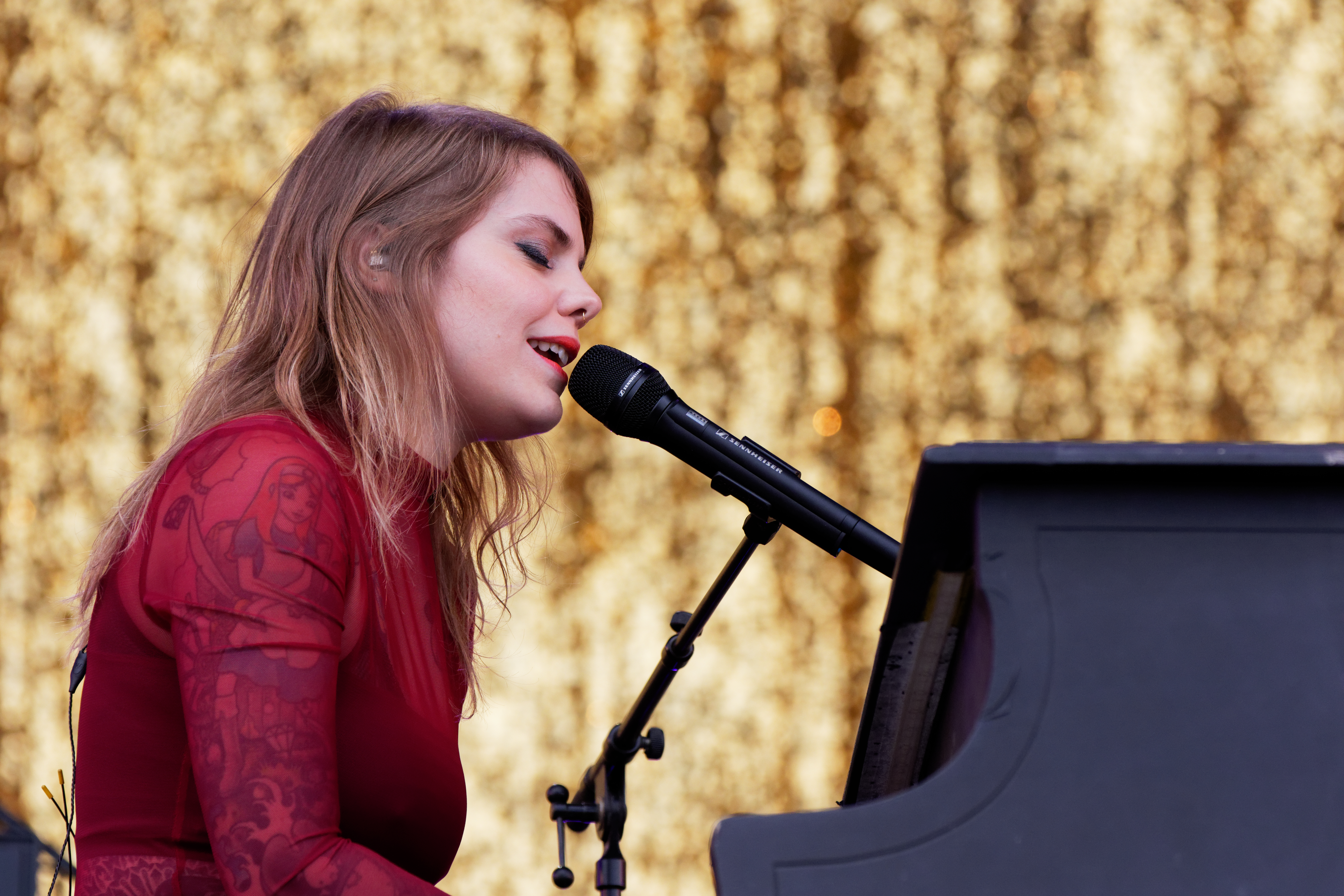
Cœur de pirate (2020)

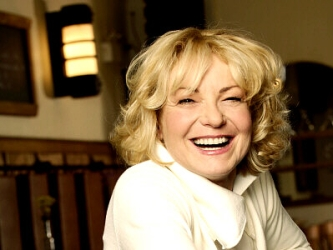
Marjo (2023)

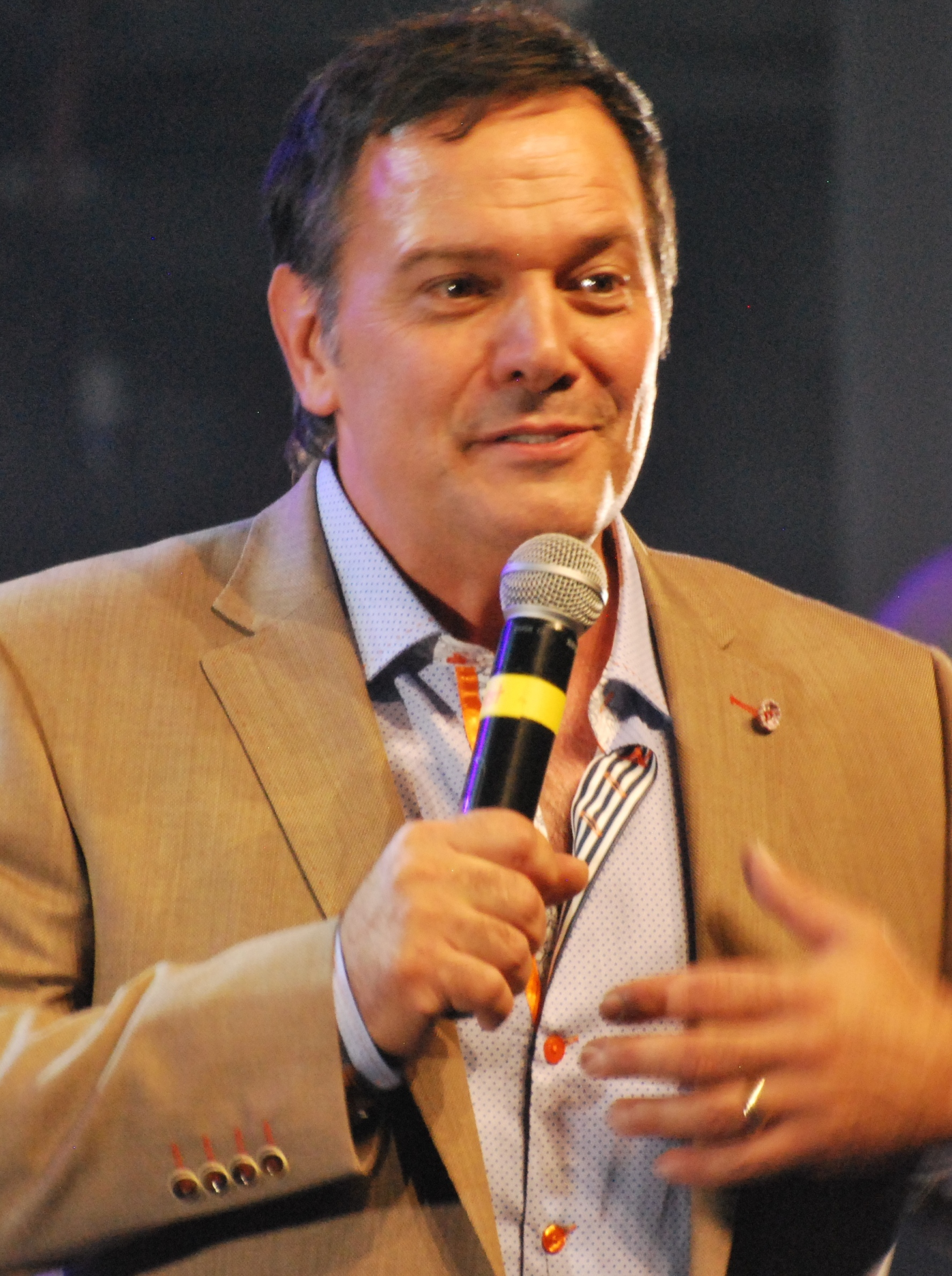
Mario Pelchat (2023–)

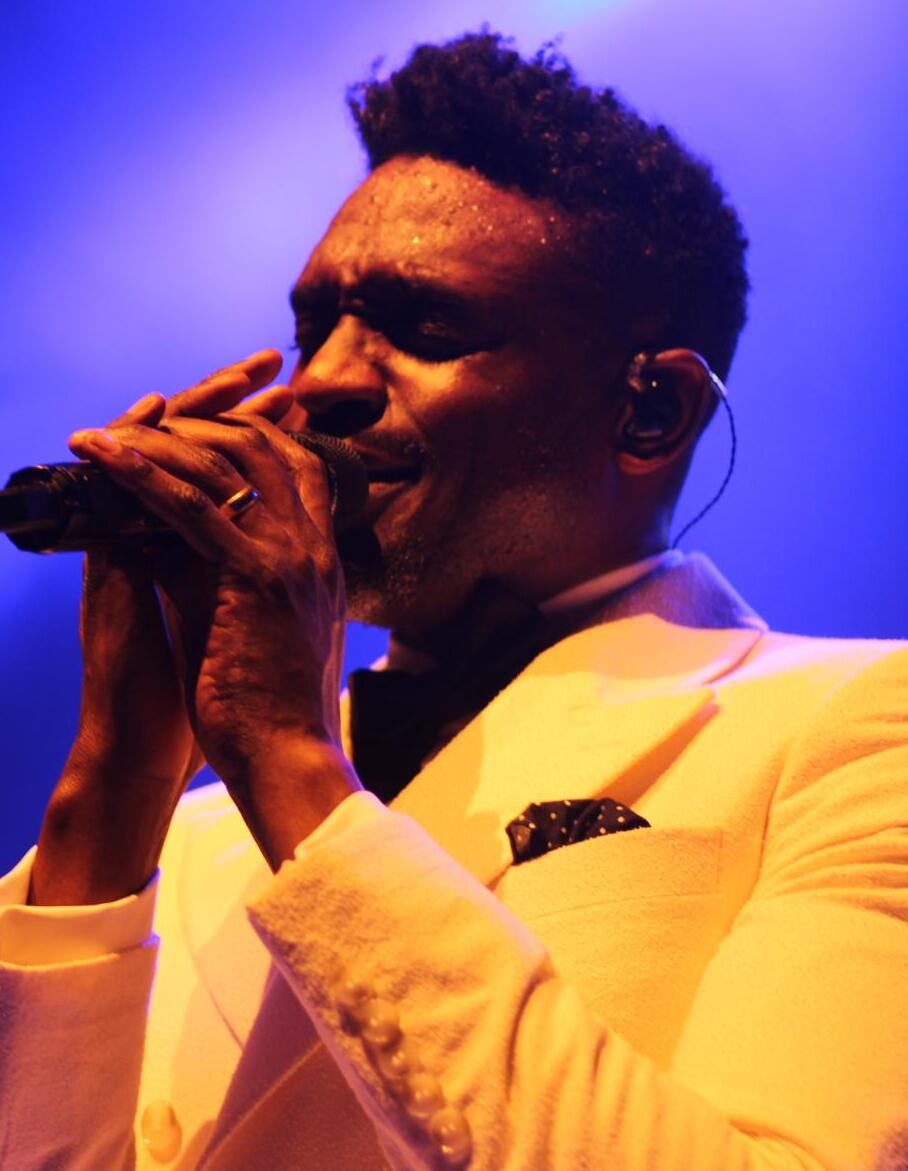
Corneille (2023–)

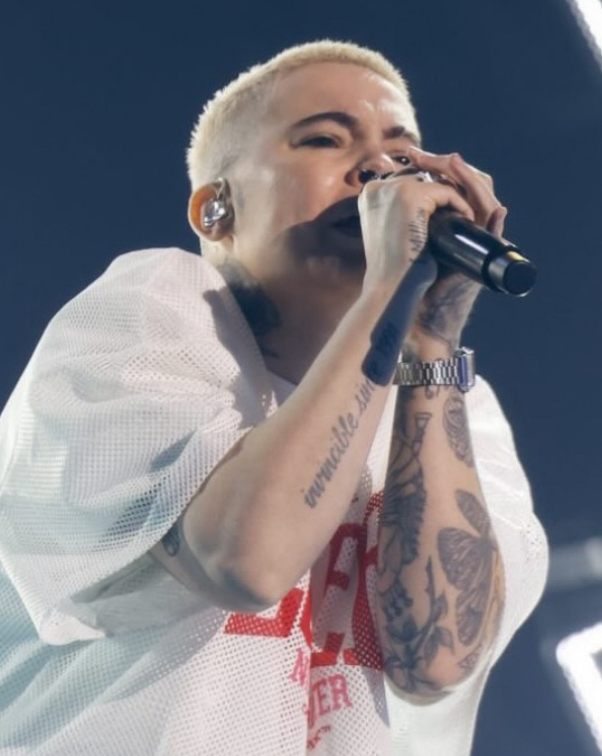
Roxane Bruneau (La Deuxième Voix, 2023; main coach, 2024–)

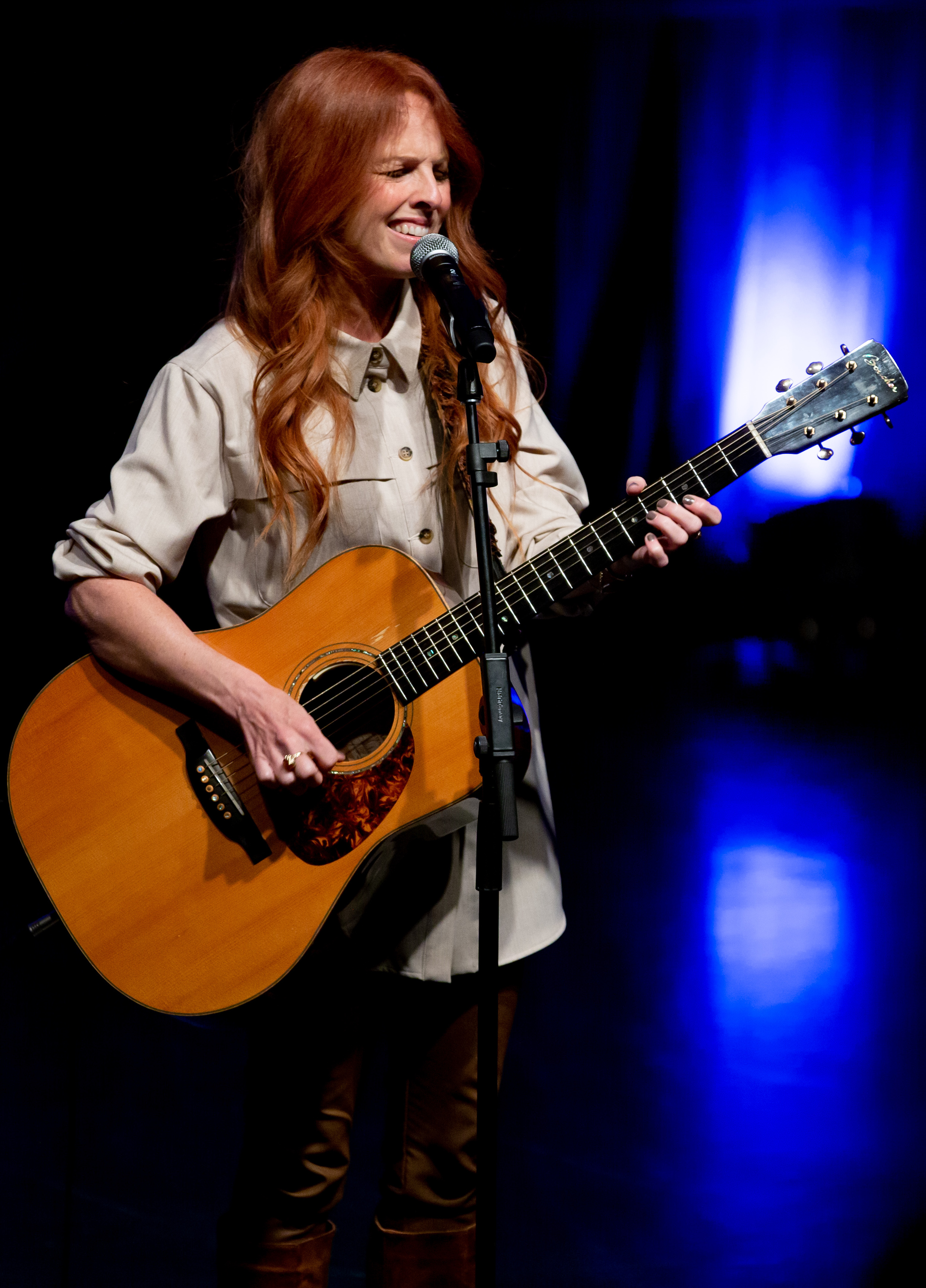
France D'Amour (2024–)
Host's gallery

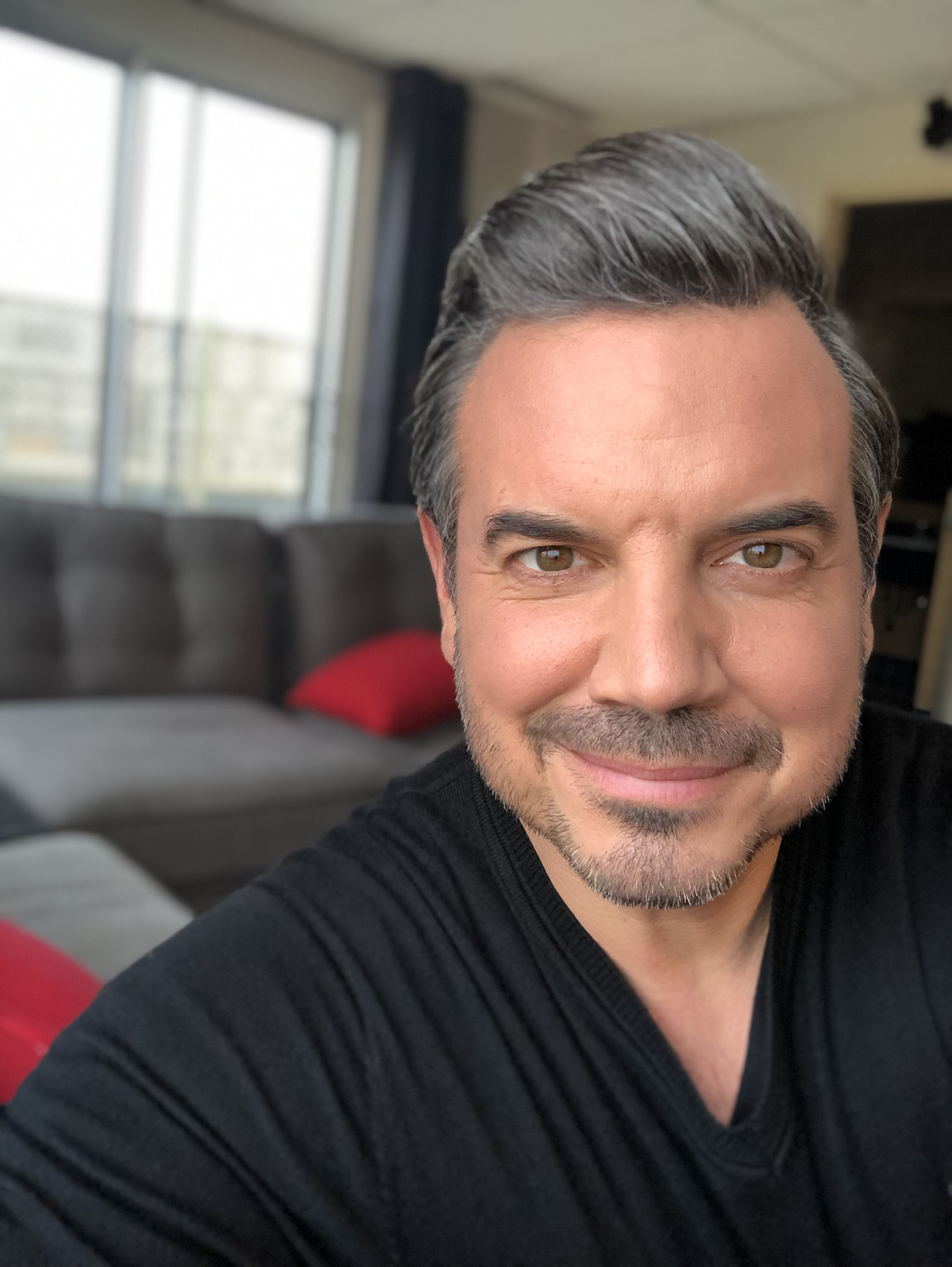
Charles Lafortune (2013–)

=== Line-up of coaches ===
Coaches' line-up by chairs order
| Season | Year | Coaches | | | |
| Season | Year | 1 | 2 | 3 | 4 |
|---|---|---|---|---|---|
| 1 | 2013 | Ariane | Jean-Pierre | Marie-Mai | Marc |
| 2 | 2014 | Louis-Jean | Éric | Isabelle | Marc |
| 3 | 2015 | Pierre | Éric | Isabelle | Marc |
| 4 | 2016 | Ariane | Éric | Pierre | Marc |
| 5 | 2017 | Pierre | Éric | Isabelle | Marc |
| 6 | 2018 | Alex | Éric | Lara | Garou |
| 7 | 2019 | Alex | Éric | Lara | Marc |
| 8 | 2020 | Garou | Cœur | Marc | Pierre |
| 9 | 2023 | Corneille | Marjo | Mario | Marc |
| 10 | 2024 | Corneille | Roxane | France | Mario |
| 11 | 2026 | Corneille | Roxane | France | Mario |

== Season summary ==
Teams color key
| Artist from Team Ariane | Artist from Team Louis-Jean | Artist from Team Mario |
| Artist from Team Marie-Mai | Artist from Team Pierre | Artist from Team Corneille |
| Artist from Team Marc | Artist from Team Garou | Artist from Team Marjo |
| Artist from Team Jean-Pierre | Artist from Team Lara | Artist from Team France |
| Artist from Team Isabelle | Artist from Team Alex | Artist from Team Roxane |
| Artist from Team Éric | Artist from Team Cœur |

Warning: the following table presents a significant amount of different colors.

La Voix series overview
| Season | Aired | Winner | Runner-up | Third place | Fourth place | Winning coach | Host |
|---|---|---|---|---|---|---|---|
| 1 | 2013 | Valérie Carpentier | Charlotte Cardin | Jérôme Couture | Étienne Cotton | Ariane Moffatt | Charles Lafortune |
| 2 | 2014 | Yoan Garneau | Renee Wilkin | Valérie Lahaie | Rémi Chassé | Isabelle Boulay | Charles Lafortune |
| 3 | 2015 | Kevin Bazinet | Angelike Falbo | Rosa Laricchiuta | Mathieu Holubowski | Marc Dupré | Charles Lafortune |
| 4 | 2016 | Stéphanie St-Jean | Travis Cormier | Yvan Pedneault | Noémie Lorzema | Pierre Lapointe | Charles Lafortune |
| 5 | 2017 | Ludovick Bourgeois | Rebecca Noelle | David Marino | Frank Williams | Éric Lapointe | Charles Lafortune |
| 6 | 2018 | Yama Laurent | Miriam Baghdassarian | Yann Brassard | Jonathan Freeman | Garou | Charles Lafortune |
| 7 | 2019 | Geneviève Jodoin | Colin Moore | Rafaëlle Roy | Vincent Chouinard | Lara Fabian | Charles Lafortune |
| 8 | 2020 | Josiane Comeau | Suzie Villeneuve | Michaela Cahill | Flora Stein | Cœur de pirate | Charles Lafortune |
| 9 | 2023 | Sophie Grenier | Jay | Christopher Therrien | Adam El-Mouna | Mario Pelchat | Charles Lafortune |
| 10 | 2024 | Maude Cyr- Deschênes | Redge Olibrice | Lee-Anne Bergevin | Jonathan Houde | France D'Amour | Charles Lafortune |
| 11 | 2026 | Rosemarie Boivin | Dayannha Édouard-Raphaël | Jason Coroa | Roxanne Garceau | Roxane Bruneau | Charles Lafortune |

== Coaches' teams ==
- Winner
- Runner-up
- Third place
- Fourth place
- First names listed are the finalists: winners in **bold** and other finalists in italic.

| Season | Ariane Moffatt | Jean-Pierre Ferland | Marie-Mai | Marc Dupré |
|---|---|---|---|---|
| 1 | **Valérie Carpentier**; Étienne Cousineau; Stevens Simeon; Valérie Clio Nerestant; Dany Flanders; Karine Deschamps | Étienne Cotton; Julie Massicotte; Meredith Marshall; Maria Janice Galvez; Joanie Roussel; Jean Sébastien Lavoie | Charlotte Cardin-Goyer; Jacynthe Véronneau; Valérie Amyot; Jeffrey Piton; Fred Lebel; Félix-Antoine Couturier | Jérôme Couture; Jael Bird Joseph; Andie Duquette; Edi Hysi; Alexe Gaudreault-Dallaire; Stéphanie & Sabrina Barabé |
| 2 | Louis-Jean Cormier | Éric Lapointe | Isabelle Boulay | Marc Dupré |
| 2 | Rémi Chassé; Valérie Daure; Rémi Basque; Éléonore Lagacé; Mathieu Lavoie; Sabrina Paton | Valérie Lahaie; Mathieu Provençal; Philippe Lauzon; Éloïse Boutin-Masse; Audrey Fréchette; Rita Tabbakh | **Yoan Garneau**; Marie-Ève Fournier; Philippe Berghella; Sandra Christin; Véronique Gilbert; Claudia Marsan | Renee Wilkin; G'Nee; Julie Lefebvre; Élie Dupuis; Lawrence Castera; Mélina Laplante |
| 3 | Pierre Lapointe | Éric Lapointe | Isabelle Boulay | Marc Dupré |
| 3 | Mathieu Holubowski; Dominique Fils-Aimé; Jacob Watson; Philippe Clément; Gaya Michel Élie; Liana Bureau | Rosa Laricchiuta; Céleste Lévis; Simon Morin; Shaharah Sinclair; Johanne Lefebvre; Pierre-Luc Belval | Angelike Falbo; Lili-Ann De Francesco; Catherine Avoine; Émie Champagne; Cintia Baroud; Louis-Philip Champagne | **Kevin Bazinet**; Alicia Moffet; Sule Heitner; Karine Sainte-Marie; Élisabeth Léger; Annabelle Doucet |
| 4 | Ariane Moffatt | Éric Lapointe | Pierre Lapointe | Marc Dupré |
| 4 | Noémie Lorzema; Amélie Nault; Elie Haroun; Soran Dussaigne; Martin Goyette; Tim Brink | Travis Cormier; Markos Gonzalez; Marie-Ève Lapierre; Alexander Brown; David Latulippe; Lou-Adriane Cassidy | **Stéphanie St-Jean**; Béatrice Keeler; Sabrina Bellemare; Marielle Varin; Ryan Kennedy; Shy Shy Schullie | Yvan Pedneault; Geneviève Leclerc; Jonny Arsenault; Mary-Pier Guilbault; Sophia-Rose Boulanger; Mélanie Cormier |
| 5 | Pierre Lapointe | Éric Lapointe | Isabelle Boulay | Marc Dupré |
| 5 | David Marino; Sam Tucker; Hanorah; Zaya Solange; Karimah Marshall; Mike Valletta | **Ludovick Bourgeois**; Désirée; Jean-Seb Carré; Cindy Daniel; Guy Mapoko; Andy Bastarache | Frank Williams; Louis-Paul Gauvreau; Amos J. Willis Pride; Abigail Galwey; Marilyne Léonard-Thiffault | Rebecca Noelle; Michaël; Margau; Maxime Desrosiers; Tova Stolow; Brandon Mignacca |
| 6 | Alex Nevsky | Éric Lapointe | Lara Fabian | Garou |
| 6 | Yann Brassard; Édouard Lagacé; Antoine Lachance; Ben Alexander; Mario Cyr; Cherry Lena | Jonathan Freeman; Karine Labelle; Stéphanie Veillette; Alex Météore; Jesse Proteau; Cherylyn Toca | Miriam Baghdassarian; Félix Lemelin; Kelly Bado; Elodie Bégin; Redgee; Jean-Alexandre Boisclair | **Yama Laurent**; Samuel Babineau; Jordane Labrie; Carl Miguel Maldonado; Chloé Doyon; Sami Chaouki |
| 7 | Alex Nevsky | Éric Lapointe | Lara Fabian | Marc Dupré |
| 7 | Vincent Chouinard; Gabriel Cyr; Jacob Guay; Kelly-Ann Martin; Briana Victoria; Joel Brassard | Colin Moore; Jacques Comeau; Stephan Gagnon; Tommy Charles; Justin Lagacé; Ariane Drapeau | **Geneviève Jodoin**; Samantha Neves; Frédérique Germain; Mory Hatem; Marianne Mathieu; Christian Marc Gendron | Rafaëlle Roy; Rick Pagano; Jordan Levesque; Cristine Toca; Ferline Regis; Mélissa Ouimet |
| 8 | Garou | Cœur de pirate | Marc Dupré | Pierre Lapointe |
| 8 | Suzie Villeneuve; Philippe Tremblay; Gabriel Forest; Karolane Brisson; Allison Daniels; Gabriel Langelier | **Josiane Comeau**; Clément Jacques; Marie-Luce; Tom-Éliot Girard; Laurie Drolet; Beth Cossette | Michaela Cahill; Jason Valentino; Katrine Sansregret; Francis Degrandpré; Joffrey Charles; PETiTOM | Flora Stein; Malia; Alex Burger; William Fontaine-Jalbert; Catherine Laurin; Vidjay Rangaya |
| 9 | Corneille | Marjo | Mario Pelchat | Marc Dupré |
| 9 | Jay; Christa Maria Abou Akl; Avril Roy-Jensen; Sylveo; Élysabeth Rivest; Mélodie-Jade | Christopher Therrien; Julie St-Pierre; Nathaël Young; Mélanie Haché; Philippe Plourde; Will | **Sophie Grenier**; Steffy Beyong; Jephte Phelice; Tommy Demers; Joël Boudreault; Marie-France Lantin | Adam El-Mouna; Loïk Jolicœur; Audrey-Anne Séguin; Gabrielle Grenon; Sorrene; Darren Vaudreuil |
| 10 | Corneille | Roxane Bruneau | France D'Amour | Mario Pelchat |
| 10 | Redge Olibrice; Leticia Jiménez; Anaïs Goulet; Wissem; Bryan Alexandre-Melo; Jana Salameh | Jonathan Houde; Chadé Losane; Isabelle Morin; Norah Lapointe; Andrew; Rosemarie Gauthier | **Maude Cyr-Deschênes**; Lee-Anne Bergevin; Ally Neah; Guillaume Lessard; Alexis Bouchard-Leblond; Ange-Élie Ménard | Priscilla Findlay; William Osias; Camille Schlybert; Charles Goelen; Dan Daraîche; Katy Vachon |
| 11 | Dayannha Édouard-Raphaël; Anissa Essalihi; Sam Champagne; Romy Dang; Samy HMDI; Charlotte Lafortune | **Rosemarie Boivin**; Marie Des Neiges; Sarah Bourdon; Anthony Prégent; Mahé Rabesa; Émile Dubois | Roxanne Garceau; Alexis St-Pierre; Isabelle Goulet; Guillaume Lecompte; Gabrielle Nessel; Zac Provençal | Jason Coroa; Jade Mathieu; Jordan Grandmont; René Lajoie; Maïka Pelchat; Justine & Samuel Thibault |

== La Voix Junior ==
La Voix Junior was the French-Canadian version of The Voice Kids. It premiered on October 2, 2016, on TVA. The coaches were Marc Dupré, Marie-Mai, and Alex Nevsky. All three coaches returned for season 2, in 2017. In February 2018, it was reported that La Voix Junior would be replaced by a dance competition called Révolution.

La Voix Junior series overview
| Season | First aired | Last aired | Winner | Runner-up | Third place | Winning coach | Host | Coaches (chairs' order) | | |
| Season | First aired | Last aired | Winner | Runner-up | Third place | Winning coach | Host | 1 | 2 | 3 |
|---|---|---|---|---|---|---|---|---|---|---|
| 1 | Oct 2, 2016 | Nov 27, 2016 | Charles Kardos | Andy Khun | Zion-Luna & Camila | Alex Nevsky | Charles Lafortune | Alex | Marie-Mai | Marc |
| 2 | Sep 24, 2017 | Nov 19, 2017 | Sydney Lallier | Alexandre Picard | Angélie St-Amand | Marie-Mai | Charles Lafortune | Alex | Marie-Mai | Marc |
