= Josiane Comeau =

Josiane
- Born: 2000 or 2001 (age 25–26)
- Musical career
- Origin: Dieppe, New Brunswick
- Genre: Pop
- Labels: Parlophone; Warner

Josiane Comeau, known mononymously as Josiane, is a Canadian singer. She rose to prominence after winning season eight of La Voix in 2020. On October 27, 2026, she was named one of five finalists to represent Canada at the Eurovision Song Contest 2027.

Her debut full-length album, Take Care, was released in March 2026.

She is from New Brunswick and is Acadian.
