= Kevin Bazinet =

Canadian pop singer

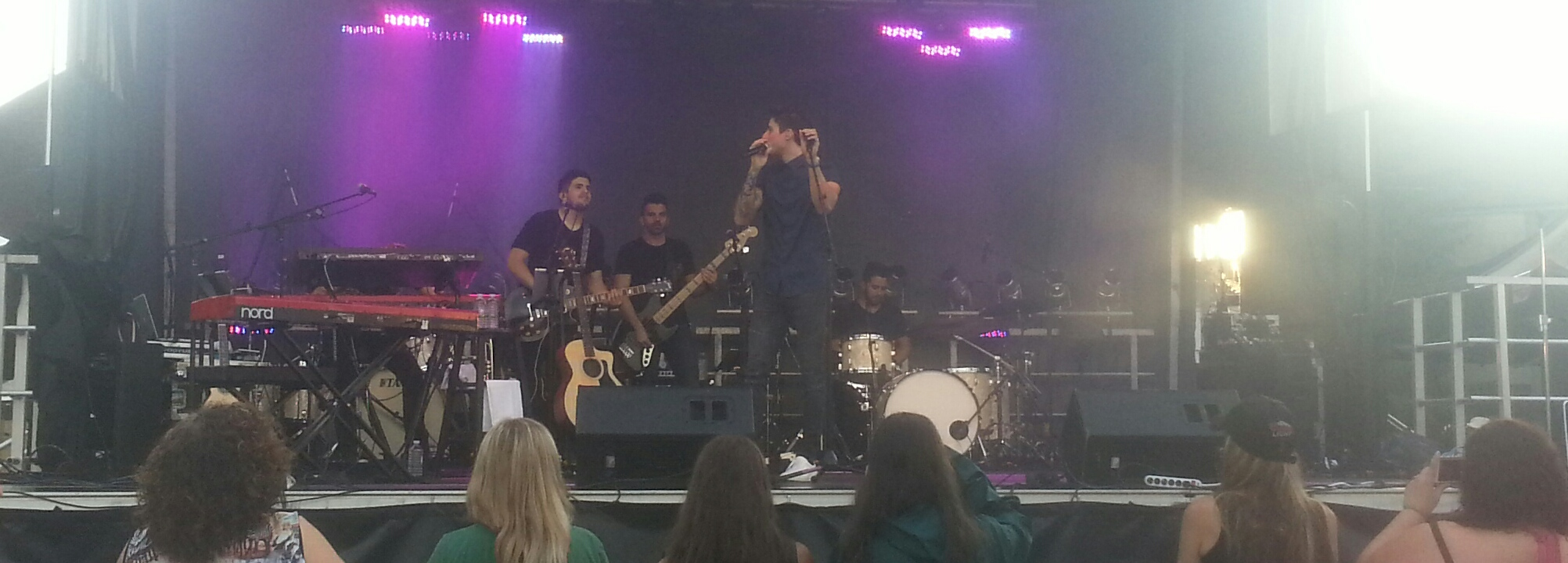
Kevin Bazinet photographed in Longueuil, Quebec, Canada at the Canada Day In Longueuil festival.

Kevin Bazinet (born June 14, 1991) is a Canadian pop singer, who won the third season of the reality television series La Voix in 2015.

== Background ==
Originally from Mont-Laurier, Quebec, he is the younger brother of singer Bobby Bazini. In the late 2000s, he became a popular performer on YouTube, performing both original songs and covers, and received a recording contract offer from EMI France in 2009. However, the contract fell through as Bazinet battled an anxiety disorder.

== La Voix ==
After taking time away from the business to look after his physical and emotional health, he reemerged in 2015 as a competitor on La Voix, auditioning with an acoustic version of Sam Smith's song "Latch".

In the finale on April 12, he performed "Jusqu’où tu m’aimes", a song written by his coach Marc Dupré and Alex Nevsky. He was named the winner at the end of the episode, with 46 per cent of the audience vote.

== Recording career ==
On May 12, "Jusqu'où tu m'aimes" was released as his first radio single. The song peaked at #2 on Quebec's French language pop charts.

In June, Bobby and Kevin performed together on Quebec's Opération Enfant Soleil telethon, duetting on a version of The Bee Gees' "To Love Somebody".

He released the album Talk to Me in fall 2015, and toured to support it. However, he did not release any followup recordings in the next several years, and instead became a music teacher, although he continued to perform occasional concerts.

In 2024 he released the EP Unfinished, his first new recording since Talk to Me. He also made a number of television appearances, performing a stunt audition for Dupré on the 10th anniversary special episode of La Voix, and appearing on the debut season of Quel talent!, the Quebec version of the international Got Talent franchise, with Harmonix, a vocal group comprising several of his students.

== Personal life ==
He was romantically involved with his fellow La Voix competitor Alicia Moffet in the 2010s. They later broke up, with Bazinet subsequently announcing that he was in a new relationship with Charlie Cormier.

Bazinet and Moffet remained close friends, however; after Cormier suffered a miscarriage in 2019, Bazinet noted in a television interview that Moffet was an important part of their support system.

In 2021, Cormier gave birth to the couple's first child, a daughter named Madeline who was the subject of one of the songs on Unfinished.

== Discography ==
- Mystery Love - 2009
- Talk to Me - 2015
- Unfinished - 2024
