= Marjo (singer) =

Canadian singer-songwriter (born 1953)

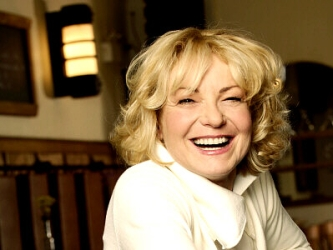

Background information
- Born: Marjolène Morin; 2 August 1953 (age 73); Montreal, Quebec, Canada
- Genres: Pop, rock
- Occupations: singer, songwriter
- Instrument: vocals
- Years active: 1979–present

Marjolène Morin (born 2 August 1953), professionally known as Marjo, is a Canadian singer-songwriter from Quebec.

== Background ==
Morin was born and raised in Montreal, Quebec. She worked as a model and editor for the fashion magazine Madame, and as manager of the Montreal jazz club L'Air du temps, and was cast in two musicals by François Guy.

She joined the band Corbeau in 1979, two years after the group was started by Pierre Harel. After Corbeau disbanded, she cowrote and recorded "Touch Me", the theme song for the film A Woman in Transit (La Femme de l'hôtel), which earned a Genie Award for Best Original Song in 1985.

== Solo career ==
She released her debut album, Celle qui va, in 1986. One of her first concerts to promote the album on its initial release was as an opening act for Eartha Kitt, but a press conference to promote the concert ended in controversy when Kitt pulled Morin's hair and spilled wine in her lap. The album ultimately sold more than 250 000 copies, was certified double platinum by the Canadian Recording Industry Association, and won three Prix Félix. One critic wrote at the time that her stage show generated, so much electricity that she was the musical equivalent of James Bay. The album was subsequently released in France under the title Amoureuse, and was promoted by a tour of Europe.

In 1988, she appeared on Gerry Boulet's influential album Rendez-vous doux, as a duet vocalist on the song "Les Yeux du cœur".

She followed up with Tant qu'il y aura des enfants in 1990. The album was again a chart success in Quebec; in addition to the hit singles "À bout de ciel" and "Je sais, je sais", the album included the English language song "Crazy Notions". She won four Prix Félix for the album, including Best Rock Album and Best Song for "Je sais, je sais". The album was again certified double platinum for sales of over 200,000 copies.

She returned in 1995 with the album Bohémienne. The album was certified platinum by October 1995, garnered awards from SOCAN for the singles "Bohémienne" and "Trop d'amour", and was a shortlisted Juno Award nominee for Best Francophone Album at the Juno Awards of 1996.

She released the albums Bootleg Blues in 1998, Sans retour in 2001 and Turquoise in 2005. In 2009 and 2010, she released the albums Marjo et ses hommes, Vol. 1 and Marjo et ses hommes, Vol. 2, which featured songs from throughout her career newly rerecorded as duets with a variety of male vocalists including Martin Deschamps, Jonathan Painchaud, Yann Perreau, Éric Lapointe, Richard Séguin, Richard Desjardins, Mario Pelchat, Gilles Vigneault, Dan Bigras and Luc de Larochellière. The second volume also included the original recording of "Les Yeux du cœur", which had not previously been available on one of Marjo's albums. She has not released a new album of material since Vol. 2, but has continued to undertake occasional live performances, most recently at a 2017 Saint-Jean-Baptiste Day concert on the Plains of Abraham in Quebec City.

In 2016, she took her first acting role, in Sophie Dupuis's film Family First (Chien de garde).

== Discography ==
=== Albums ===
- 1986: Celle qui va
- 1990: Tant qu'il y aura des enfants
- 1995: Bohémienne
- 1998: Bootleg Blues
- 2001: Sans retour
- 2005: Turquoise
- 2009: Marjo et ses hommes, Vol. 1
- 2010: Marjo et ses hommes, Vol. 2
