= Marc Dupré =

Canadian musician (born 1973)

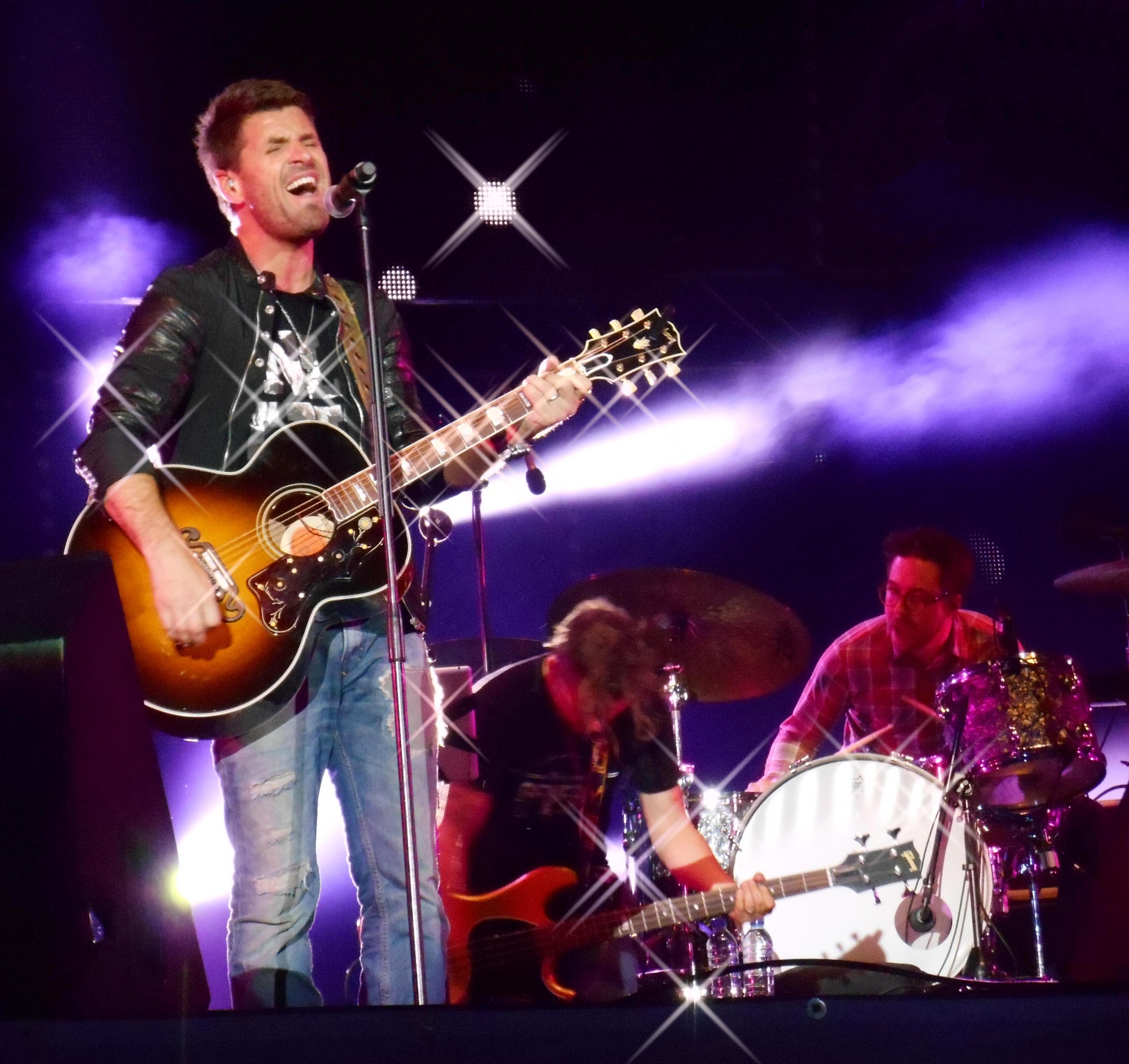
- Dupré performing at Les FrancoFolies de Montréal in 2014

Background information
- Born: July 28, 1973 (age 53); Terrebonne, Quebec, Canada
- Genres: French pop, pop rock
- Occupation: Singer-songwriter
- Instruments: Guitar, Vocals
- Website: http://www.marcdupre.com/

Marc Dupré (born July 28, 1973) is a Canadian singer-songwriter and comedian from Quebec.

== Career ==
Dupré began his career as a stand-up comedian, known particularly as a musical impressionist who performed music in the voices and styles of various singers, before turning to recording conventional pop music in the mid-2000s. As a comedian, he was particularly famous for his vocal impression of Bryan Adams, while other singers he impersonated in his shows included Mario Pelchat and Éric Lapointe.

After turning to music, he continued to include shorter comedy segments in his concert performances, as well as performing selected Adams covers, but stopped performing regular full shows as a comedian.

His first album release was Refaire le monde in 2005. It included "Tout près du bonheur", a duet with Céline Dion. The song was originally written by Dion for Dupré's wedding to her stepdaughter Anne-Marie Angélil, and a music video was also released that was shot in Nevada. At the first Gala Artis, held in Montreal on April 30, 2006, Céline Dion also performed the song with Dupré.

Dupré opened for Céline Dion in her "Taking Chances" tour in Montréal and the release of a second album Revenir à toi in 2008.

His third album Entre deux mondes also contained a duet with Dion in the track "Y'a pas de mots".

His fourth album, titled Nous sommes les mêmes, was released in 2013. The title track was a hit in Quebec, and earned him the Félix Award for Popular Song of the Year at the 35th Félix Awards, with Dupré also winning the award for Male Artist of the Year. The album was certified gold in Quebec.

He has also cooperated with other artists, including Marc-André Fortin, Marie-Pier Perreault, Wilfred Le Bouthillier, Annie Villeneuve, Marie-Ève Côté, Maxime McGraw, Jérôme Couture, Jean-Marc Couture and Olivier Dion.

In 2018, Dupré recorded and released a cover of Calum Scott's "You Are the Reason" as a duet with his daughter Stella.

In 2023, he announced that in 2024 he would return to comedy with Ben voyons donc, his first full comedy show since his debut as a singer-songwriter.

== In popular culture ==
In 2012, he produced the annual album of the Quebec popular reality television series Star Académie.

From 2013 to 2017, Dupré was one of the four judges of La Voix, the French Canadian version of The Voice. Through the years, he sat next to Marie-Mai, Jean-Pierre Ferland, Ariane Moffatt, Isabelle Boulay, Éric Lapointe, Louis-Jean Cormier, and Pierre Lapointe.

He was also, in 2016 and 2017, one of the three coaches of La Voix Junior, the French-Canadian version of The Voice Kids, along with Marie-Mai and Alex Nevsky.

In October 2017, Dupré announced his intention to take a break from La Voix, heading into its sixth season. He will also take a break from the kids' version, La Voix Junior. However, he will return to La Voix for its seventh season, in 2019.

In 2021 he was one of the panelists on Chanteurs masqués, the Quebec adaptation of the Masked Singer franchise.

In 2024 he was profiled in Marc Dupré: à la croisée des chemins, a TVA documentary special about his life and career.

== Personal life ==
He was married to Anne-Marie Angélil, the daughter of René Angélil with his second wife Anne Renée, and the stepdaughter of Céline Dion. They have three children. They divorced in 2023 after 23 years of marriage.

== Discography ==
=== Albums ===
Title	Album details	Notes
Refaire le monde	Released: 2005; Label: Les Disques DAMA; Formats: CD	
Revenir à toi	Released: 2007; Label: Les Disques DAMA; Formats: CD, digital download	
Entre deux mondes	Released: October 10, 2010; Label: Les Disques DAMA; Formats: CD, digital download	No. / Title / Length; 1. / "Mille raisons" / 3:28; 2. / "Y'a pas de mots" (Duet with Céline Dion) / 3:12; 3. / "On s'habitué" / 3:41; 4. / "Si on changeait" / 3:49; 5. / "Entre deux mondes" / 3:43; 6. / "Le jour se lève" / 3:16; 7. / "Comme un seul homme" / 3:51; 8. / "Pour qu'on se garde" / 3:40; 9. / "Comme des sauveurs" / 3:51; 10. / "Sans raison" / 3:30; 11. / "Ça donne quoi?" / 3:50
Nous sommes les mêmes	Released: 2013; Label: Formats: CD, digital download	
Là dans ma tête	Released: 2014; Label: Formats: CD, digital download	
La vie qu'il nous reste	Released: 2017; Label: L-A BE; Formats: CD, digital download	
Rien ne se perd	Released: 2019; Label: L-A BE; Formats: CD, digital download	
Où sera le monde	Released: 2021; Label: Musicor; Formats: CD, digital download	
Parce que ce soir	Released: 2025; Label: Musicor; Formats: CD, digital download	

=== Singles ===
Year	Single	Peak positions	Album
Year	Single	CAN	Album
2006	"Tout près du bonheur" (with Céline Dion)		Refaire le monde
2008	"Sans toi"	85	Revenir à toi
2008	"Si pour te plaire"	86	Revenir à toi
2010	"Entre deux mondes"	87	Entre deux mondes
2013	"Nous sommes les mêmes"	47	Nous sommes les mêmes
2013	"Un coup sur mon cœur"	91	Nous sommes les mêmes
"—" denotes releases that did not chart
