= Éric Lapointe (singer) =

Canadian musician

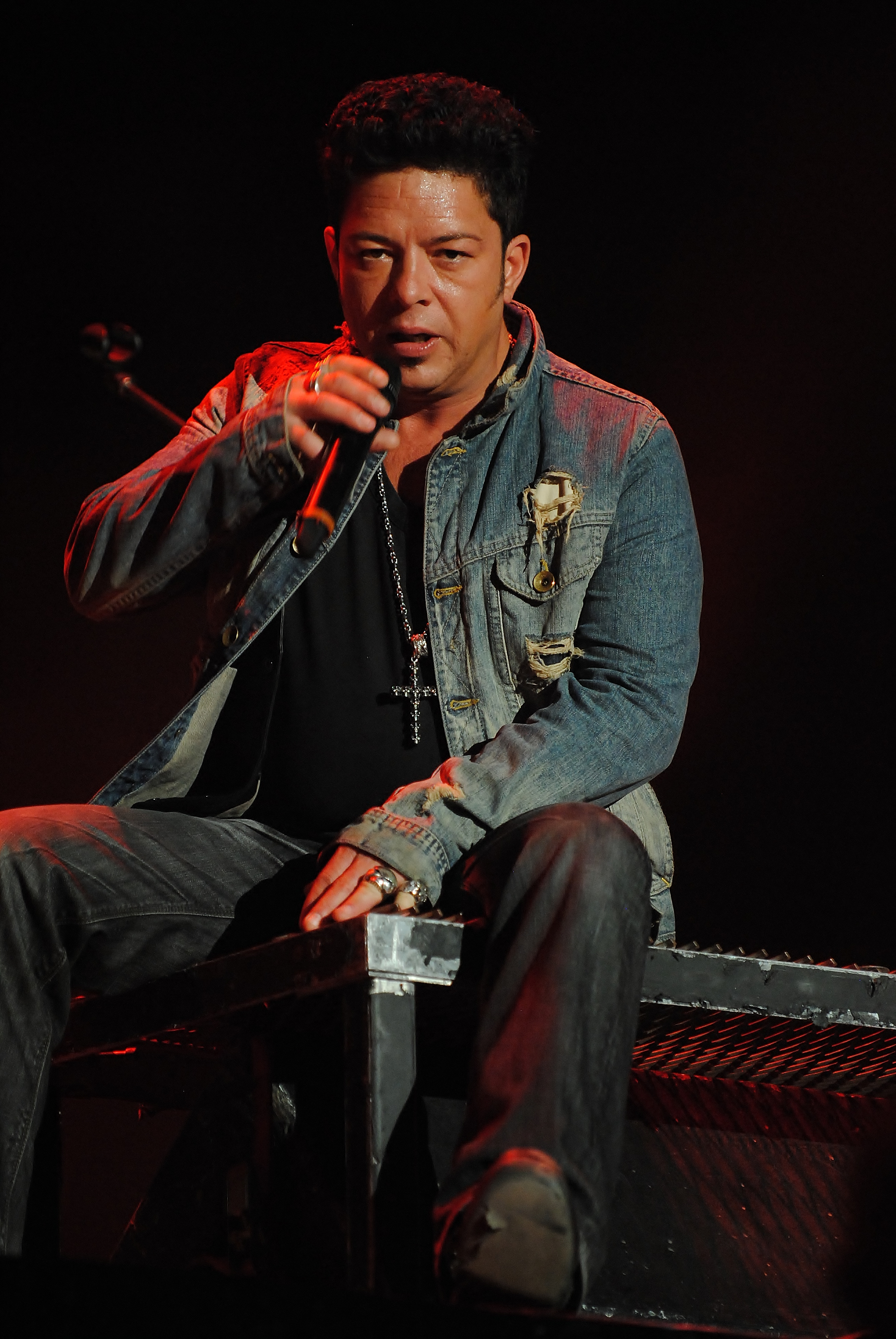
- Lapointe in 2012

Background information
- Born: 28 September 1969 (age 57); Montreal, Quebec, Canada
- Origin: Quebec, Canada
- Occupations: Musician, singer-songwriter
- Labels: Diffusion YFB Inc., Disques Gamma
- Members: Martin Bolduc; Rick Bourque; Bruce Cameron; Éric Lapointe; Mic Miette
- Past members: Stéphane Dufour; Ange E. Curcio
- Website: www.ericlapointe.com

Éric Lapointe (Canadian French: [eʁɪk lapwãẽ̯t]; born 28 September 1969) is a Francophone lead singer and guitarist for his eponymous band. His band is characterized by a heavy metal style containing elements of punk, grunge, pop, and hard rock. Lapointe has released eight studio albums, three compilation albums, and two live albums.

== Biography ==
=== Childhood ===
Born in Montreal, Quebec, Canada, Lapointe is the eldest of three children; he has two brothers, Marc and Hugo. Their father, Serge, served in the military and his family often had to move, which saw them relocate thirteen times by the time Lapointe turned 16. At nine years old, when Lapointe asked for a plastic guitar from a Sears catalogue, he was instead given a real one by his father. By the age of ten, he was already composing his first song.

=== Early career ===
At the age of 18, Lapointe joined the Parti Québécois and was discovered by Yves-François Blanchet (former president of l'ADISQ; current leader of the Bloc Québécois) who went on to manage his early career. Lapointe started out by playing at local bars and CEGEPs.

At the age of 20, Lapointe wrote his first hit single "N'importe quoi" ("Anything"). Despite having little money, Lapointe organized a showcase at a popular bar called Club Soda for record industry scouts. A representative of Disques Gamma, Patrice Duchesne, was impressed by Lapointe's talent and offered him a record contract. His debut album Obsession was released in 1994.

=== 1996–2007: Continued success ===
Lapointe and his band produced several other albums including Invitez les Vautours ("Invite the Vultures") in 1996, À l'ombre de l'ange ("In the Shadow of the Angel,") in 1999, and Adrénaline, a live album. In November 2004, Lapointe released Coupable ("Guilty").

On 8 April 2002, he launched Adrénaline, a double-album containing 25 live tracks that includes several covers. He also participated in the compilation of Le Petit Roi, and was especially noticed for his interpretation of "Une chance qu'on s'a" by Jean-Pierre Ferland. Lapointe released the album Coupable a few weeks later, which featured the song "La Bartendresse", featuring a video written by Quebec actor Patrick Huard. On 22 November 2006, Lapointe released a greatest hits album called 1994-2006: N'importe Qui.

=== 2008–present ===
On 22 April 2008, Lapointe's fifth studio album, Ma Peau, was released. The 2009 compilation album, Ailleurs, Volume 1 includes duets with Céline Dion, Isabelle Boulay, Dan Bigras, Nanette Workman, and Les Divans, as well as a trio with Garou and Claude Dubois. The Dion duet is a remake of her 1991 hit "L'amour existe encore". A cover album entitled Volume 2 was released later in 2009. Lapointe also teamed with Marjo for a remake of her 1990 hit "Ailleurs" as a blues-rock ballad. It appears on her greatest hits remakes album Marjo et ses hommes.

His sixth studio album, Le ciel de mes combats, was released on 30 November 2010, and features Roger Tabra as cowriter, Aldo Nova on guitar, and Dufour as producer. In 2011, Lapointe collaborated with the Montreal Symphony Orchestra to create Lapointe Symphonique. Since 2014, he is one of the four judges of La Voix, the Quebec version of The Voice.

In 2020, he pleaded guilty to assaulting a woman in 2019.

== Filmography ==
In 1997, Lapointe released two songs, "Le Screw" and "Les Boys", written for the movie Les Boys. In 1998, he wrote two more songs for Les Boys II: "Rocket" and "Alléluia." He produced seven additional songs for the soundtrack of Les Boys III, including "Le Boys Blues Band." Lapointe also cameoed as Bruno in several episodes of the television series.

== Band members ==
=== Current musicians ===
- Martin Bolduc – bass
- Ange E. Curcio – drums (1996–2006, 2022–present)
- Bruce Cameron – keys
- Mic Myette – guitars
- Stephane Dufour – guitars
- Rosa Laricchiuta – backing vocals

=== Past musicians ===
- Adrien Bance – guitars
- Rick Bourque – drums
- Stéphane Campeau – bass
- Dennis Chatrand – keyboards, organ
- Stéphane Dufour – guitars (1994–2007)
- Tino Izzo – guitars
- Aldo Nova – piano, keyboards, guitars
- Claude Pineault – guitars, backing vocals

== Discography ==
=== Studio albums ===
- Obsession (1994)
- Invitez les vautours (1996)
- À l'ombre de l'ange (1999)
- Coupable (2004)
- Ma peau (2008)
- Le ciel de mes combats (2010)
- Jour de Nuit (2013)
- Delivrance (2018)

=== Live albums ===
- Adrénaline (2002) (Platinum)
- Lapointe Symphonique (2011)

=== Compilations ===
- Invitez les vautours (2002 Digipak Re-release with DVD)
- 1994-2006: N'importe qui (2006) (Gold)
- Ailleurs, Volume 1 and Volume 2 (2009)

=== Soundtracks ===
- Les Boys (1997)
- Les Boys II (1998)
- Les Boys III (2001)
- Bon cop, bad cop (2006)
