= Alex Nevsky (musician) =

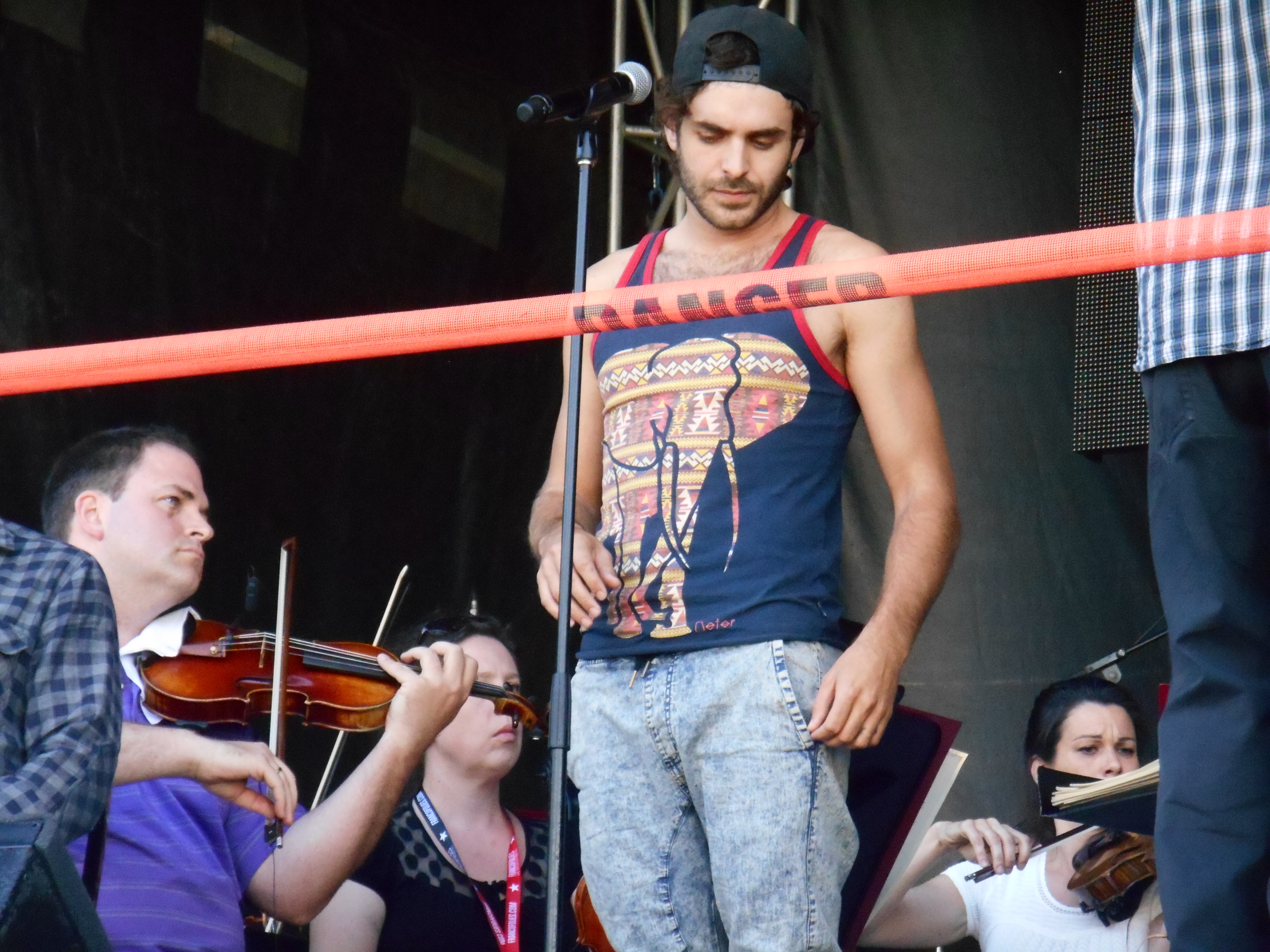
- Alex Nevsky at the FrancoFolies de Montréal

Background information
- Born: Alexandre Parent; February 17, 1986 (age 40); Granby, Quebec, Canada
- Genres: Pop
- Occupation: Singer
- Label: Audiogram
- Website: AlexNevsky.ca

Alexandre Parent (born February 17, 1986, in Granby, Quebec, Canada), better known as Alex Nevsky, is a singer-songwriter from Quebec, Canada.

He graduated from École nationale de la chanson in Granby in 2007. He participated in Festival international de la chanson de Granby (Granby International Song Festival) in 2009 reaching the semi-final. He also took part in the 14th Francouvertes contest where he was a finalist.

He released his debut album De lune à l'aube in 2010 on Audiogram. The album received two nominations at the Gala ADISQ for "Revelation of the Year" and "Best Album of Year – Pop-Rock". He was also named "Révélation Radio-Canada Musique" for 2010–2011.

On 30 August 2013, he launched his second album Himalaya mon amour for which he won during the Gala de l'ADISQ 2014, "Male Singer of Year" award and his album Himalaya mon amour the award for "Best Album of the Year – Pop", with the single "On leur a fait croire" from the album the award for "Song of the Year". Other successful singles include "Les coloriés" also from his second album, as well as "Fanny" and "Polaroid". Nevsky was a nominee for the 2014 Prix Félix‑Leclerc (Félix Leclerc Prize).

== Discography ==
=== Albums ===
- 2010: De lune à l'aube
- 2013: Himalaya mon amour
- 2016: Nos Eldorados
- 2019: Chemin Sauvage
- 2025: Tout ce que l'aube proment

=== EPs ===
- Alex Nevsky

=== Singles ===
- 2011: "Les hommes disent peu"
- 2013: "On leur a fait croire"
- 2014: "Les Coloriés"
- 2015: "Fanny"
- 2016: "Polaroid"
