= Chanteurs masqués =

Canadian reality TV singing competition (2021–)

- Genre: Reality competition
- Based on: King of Mask Singer by MBC Entertainment
- Presented by: Guillaume Lemay-Thivierge; Sébastien Benoit
- Starring: Sam Breton; Véronic DiCaire; Marc Dupré; Anouk Meunier; Stéphane Rousseau; Mélissa Bédard
- Country of origin: Canada
- Original language: French
- No. of seasons: 6
- No. of episodes: 58

Production
- Camera setup: Multiple-camera
- Running time: 60 minutes
- Production company: Groupe TVA

Original release
- Network: TVA
- Release: September 19, 2021 – present

Chanteurs Masqués (English : Masked Singers) is a Canadian French language reality singing competition television series based on the South Korean television series King of Mask Singer. The series premiered on September 19, 2021, at 6:30 p.m. (EST/EDT) on TVA. The show features celebrities singing popular songs while wearing head-to-toe costumes and face masks concealing their identities. It employs panelists who guess the celebrities' identities by interpreting clues provided to them throughout the series.

== Overview ==
=== Production ===
In February 2021, it was announced that Quebecor Media had acquired the rights to air and produce The Masked Singer format in Canada. The series was confirmed to air on Quebecor's production company Groupe TVA's network TVA in September 2021 after filming completed in August 2021.

=== Host and panelists ===
Actor Guillaume Lemay-Thivierge was announced as the main host of the program, while the announced panelists consist of comedian Sam Breton, singer Véronic DiCaire, singer Marc Dupré (who for season 4 was our clue mask Jack Spi-Rat), actress Anouk Meunier, and comedian Stéphane Rousseau.

Meunier won the Golden Ear as the panelist with the most correct guesses as to the identities of the performers throughout the season; however, Rousseau was the only panelist to correctly identify the final winners.

For season 2, Dupré left the panel and was not replaced, whereas Breton, Meunier, DiCaire and Rousseau returned. All four second season panelists returned for season 3. For season 4, Sébastien Benoit replaced Guillaume Lemay-Thivierge as host, whereas Mélissa Bédard replaced Véronic DiCaire alongside Anouk Meunier, Sam Breton and Stéphane Rousseau, who all returned. For season 5, all panelists and host from season 4 returned.

=== Response ===
In its year-end review of Canadian film and television in 2021, the trade magazine Playback named Chanteurs masqués the Unscripted Series of the Year.

== Series overview ==
Series overview
Season	Contestants	Episodes	Originally released		Winner	Runner-up	Third place
Season	Contestants	Episodes	First released	Last released	Winner	Runner-up	Third place
1	15	11	September 19, 2021	November 18, 2021	Wilfred Le Bouthillier & Marie-Élaine Thibert as "Lovebirds"	Jason Roy Léveillée as "Black Turkey"	Johanne Blouin as "Wedding Owl"
2	15	12	September 18, 2022	December 4, 2022	Véronique Claveau as "Queen of the Day and the Night"	Ludovick Bourgeois as "Robot"	Pierre-Yves Lord as "Super Otter"
3	16	12	September 17, 2023	December 3, 2023	Michel Courtemanche as "Chameleon"	Marie Denise Pelletier as "Mutante Rita"	Rita Baga as "Lion"
4	13	12	September 15, 2024	November 24, 2024	Gabrielle Destroismaisons as "Swan"	Julie Bélanger as "Betty Bett"	Benoît McGinnis as "Zebra"
5	15	11	September 14, 2025	November 23, 2025	Steph Carse as "Cardinal"	Marilou as "Cari-Belle"	William Cloutier as "Renardo"
6	15	11	September 13, 2026	November 22, 2026	TBA as TBA	TBA as TBA	TBA as TBA

== Season 1 ==
Stage name	Celebrity	Occupation	Episodes										
Stage name	Celebrity	Occupation	1	2	3	4	5	6	7	8	9	10	11
Lovebirds (Inséparables)	Wilfred Le Bouthillier	Singers	SAFE			WIN		SAFE		RISK		WIN	WINNERS
Lovebirds (Inséparables)	Marie-Élaine Thibert	Singers	SAFE			WIN		SAFE		RISK		WIN	WINNERS
Black Turkey (Dinde Noire)	Jason Roy Léveillée	Actor			SAFE		WIN	SAFE		WIN		WIN	RUNNER-UP
Wedding Owl (Harfang des Noces)	Johanne Blouin	Singer	SAFE			RISK		SAFE		WIN		WIN	THIRD
Emerald Ash Borer (Agrile du Frêne)	Bruno Pelletier	Singer			SAFE		WIN		SAFE		RISK	OUT	
Butterfly (Papillon)	Ludivine Reding	Actress		SAFE		WIN			SAFE		WIN	OUT	
Metal Moose (Orignal de Métal)	Dominic Paquet	Comedian	SAFE			WIN		SAFE			WIN	OUT	
Poutine	Annie Grenier	Actress			SAFE		WIN		SAFE		OUT		
Cake (Gâteau)	Alexandre Despatie	Diver		SAFE			RISK		SAFE	OUT			
Gladiatrix (Gladiatrice)	Lise Dion	Comedian		SAFE			RISK		OUT				
Goddess Cat (Déesse Chatte)	Sophie Thibault	Journalist	SAFE			RISK		OUT					
Space Queen (Reine de L'espace)	Lise Watier	Businesswoman		SAFE			OUT						
Shepherd Ewe (Brebis Bergère)	Marie-Claude Barrette	TV Host			SAFE	OUT							
Beaver in a Suit (Castor en Costard)	Normand Brathwaite	Comedian			OUT								
Speckled Trout (Truite Mouchetée)	Pierre Brassard	Actor		OUT									
Whitecoat (Blanchon)	Michel Bergeron	Former ice hockey coach	OUT										

The masked singer was safe from elimination.
The masked singer was eliminated from the competition and unmasked upon their elimination.
The masked singer did not perform.

== Episodes ==
=== Week 1 (19 September) ===
Performances on the first episode
#	Stage name	Song	Identity	Result
1	Metal Moose	"It's My Life" by Bon Jovi	undisclosed	SAFE
2	Goddess Cat	"Alors on danse" by Stromae	undisclosed	SAFE
3	Wedding Owl	Medley of "Je t'aime" by Lara Fabian and "Et je t'aime encore" by Celine Dion	undisclosed	SAFE
4	Whitecoat	"New York, New York" by Frank Sinatra	Michel Bergeron	OUT
5	Lovebirds	"Say Something" by A Great Big World and Christina Aguilera	undisclosed	SAFE
5	Lovebirds	"Say Something" by A Great Big World and Christina Aguilera	undisclosed	SAFE

=== Week 2 (23 September) ===
Performances on the second episode
#	Stage name	Song	Identity	Result
1	Speckled Trout	"Fais attention" by Les B.B.	Pierre Brassard	OUT
2	Cake	"Mony Mony" by Billy Idol	undisclosed	SAFE
3	Butterfly	"Je vole" by Michel Sardou	undisclosed	SAFE
4	Space Queen	"A Sky Full of Stars" by Coldplay	undisclosed	SAFE
5	Gladiatrix	"We're Not Gonna Take It" by Twisted Sister	undisclosed	SAFE

=== Week 3 (3 October) ===
Performances on the third episode
#	Stage name	Song	Identity	Result
1	Poutine	"9 to 5" by Dolly Parton/"Born This Way" by Lady Gaga	undisclosed	SAFE
2	Beaver in a Suit	"J't'aime comme un fou" by Robert Charlebois	Normand Brathwaite	OUT
3	Shepherd Ewe	"La Vie en rose" by Édith Piaf	undisclosed	SAFE
4	Emerald Ash Borer	"Bad Guy" by Billie Eilish	undisclosed	SAFE
5	Black Turkey	"Isn't She Lovely"/"Superstition" by Stevie Wonder	undisclosed	SAFE

=== Week 4 (10 October) ===
Performances on the fourth episode
#	Stage name	Song	Identity	Result
1	Goddess Cat	"Désenchantée" by Mylène Farmer	undisclosed	RISK
2	Lovebirds	"Je l'aime à mourir" by Francis Cabrel	undisclosed	WIN
2	Lovebirds	"Je l'aime à mourir" by Francis Cabrel	undisclosed	WIN
3	Shepherd Ewe	"Higher Love" by Steve Winwood	Marie-Claude Barrette	OUT
4	Butterfly	"Je veux" by Zaz	undisclosed	WIN
5	Metal Moose	"Un peu plus haut, Un peu plus loin" by Ginette Reno	undisclosed	WIN
6	Wedding Owl	"Piece of My Heart" by Erma Franklin	undisclosed	RISK

=== Week 5 (17 October) ===
Performances on the fifth episode
#	Stage name	Song	Identity	Result
1	Cake	"Grand Champion" by Les Trois Accords	undisclosed	RISK
2	Emerald Ash Borer	"Kiss" by Prince	undisclosed	WIN
3	Black Turkey	"Soulman" by Ben l'Oncle Soul	undisclosed	WIN
4	Gladiatrix	"Humana" by Lara Fabian	undisclosed	RISK
5	Space Queen	"Bad Romance" by Lady Gaga	Lise Watier	OUT
6	Poutine	"Groove Is in the Heart" by Deee-Lite	undisclosed	WIN

=== Week 6 (24 October) ===
Performances on the sixth episode
#	Stage name	Song	Identity	Result
1	Wedding Owl	"Let It Be" by The Beatles	undisclosed	SAFE
2	Goddess Cat	"Coton ouaté" by Bleu Jeans Bleu	Sophie Thibault	OUT
3	Black Turkey	"Les bombes" by Michel Pagliaro	undisclosed	SAFE
4	Lovebirds	"(I've Had) The Time of My Life" by Bill Medley and Jennifer Warnes	undisclosed	SAFE
4	Lovebirds	"(I've Had) The Time of My Life" by Bill Medley and Jennifer Warnes	undisclosed	SAFE
5	Metal Moose	"Summer of '69" by Bryan Adams	undisclosed	SAFE

=== Week 7 (31 October) ===
Performances on the seventh episode
#	Stage name	Song	Identity	Result
1	Poutine	"J'ai vu" by Niagara	undisclosed	SAFE
2	Butterfly	"C'est zéro" by Julie Masse	undisclosed	SAFE
3	Emerald Ash Borer	"Physical" by Dua Lipa	undisclosed	SAFE
4	Gladiatrix	"The Best" by Bonnie Tyler	Lise Dion	OUT
5	Cake	"Step by Step" by New Kids on the Block	undisclosed	SAFE

=== Week 8 (7 November) ===
- Group Performance: "I've Got the Music in Me" by The Kiki Dee Band/"Laissez-Moi Danser" by Dalida

Performances on the eighth episode
#	Stage name	Song	Identity	Result
1	Black Turkey	"Suavemente" by Elvis Crespo	undisclosed	WIN
2	Lovebirds	"Le Monde est stone" by Fabienne Thibeault	undisclosed	RISK
2	Lovebirds	"Le Monde est stone" by Fabienne Thibeault	undisclosed	RISK
3	Cake	"Cake by the Ocean" by DNCE	Alexandre Despatie	OUT
4	Wedding Owl	"The Show Must Go On" by Queen	undisclosed	WIN

=== Week 9 (14 November) ===
- Group performance: "J'ai mangé trop de patates frites"/"Coton ouaté" by Bleu Jeans Bleu

Performances on the ninth episode
#	Stage name	Song	Identity	Result
1	Emerald Ash Borer	"Seven Nation Army" by The White Stripes	undisclosed	RISK
2	Butterfly	"S'il suffisait d'aimer" by Celine Dion	undisclosed	WIN
3	Poutine	"Jump Around" by House of Pain	Annie Grenier	OUT
4	Metal Moose	"Deux Par Deux Rassemblés" by Pierre Lapointe	undisclosed	WIN

=== Week 10 (21 November) ===
Performances on the tenth episode
#	Stage name	Song	Identity	Result
1	Wedding Owl	"Let It Go" by Idina Menzel	undisclosed	WIN
2	Metal Moose	"Casser La Voix" by Patrick Bruel	Dominic Paquet	OUT
3	Black Turkey	"Lean on Me" by Bill Withers	undisclosed	WIN
4	Butterfly	"Hymne à la beauté du monde" by Isabelle Boulay	Ludivine Reding	OUT
5	Emerald Ash Borer	"C'est moi" by Marie-Mai	Bruno Pelletier	OUT
6	Lovebirds	"(Everything I Do) I Do It for You" by Bryan Adams	undisclosed	WIN
6	Lovebirds	"(Everything I Do) I Do It for You" by Bryan Adams	undisclosed	WIN

=== Week 11 (28 November) ===
- Group Performance: "Incognito"/"Je danse dans ma tête" by Celine Dion (Final 3), "Oxygène" by Celine Dion (Wedding Owl), "I Will Survive" by Gloria Gaynor (Black Turkey), "Tu t'en vas" by Alain Barrière (Lovebirds), "The Final Countdown" by Europe (Final 3)

Performances on the eleventh episode
#	Stage name	Song	Identity	Result
1	Wedding Owl	"I Will Follow Him" by Peggy March	Johanne Blouin	THIRD
2	Black Turkey	"Mes Blues Passent Pu Dans' Porte" by Offenbach	Jason Roy Léveillée	RUNNER-UP
3	Lovebirds	"Someone Like You" by Adele	Wilfred Le Bouthillier	WINNERS
3	Lovebirds	"Someone Like You" by Adele	Marie-Élaine Thibert	WINNERS

== Season 2 ==
Stage name	Celebrity	Occupation	Episodes											
Stage name	Celebrity	Occupation	1	2	3	4	5	6	7	8	9	10	11	12
Queen of the Day and the Night (Reine du Jour et de la Nuit)	Véronique Claveau	Singer	SAFE			WIN		SAFE		SAFE		SAFE	SAFE	WINNER
Robot	Ludovick Bourgeois	Singer		SAFE			WIN		SAFE	SAFE		SAFE	SAFE	RUNNER-UP
Supper Otter (Super Loutre)	Pierre-Yves Lord	Radio personality	SAFE			RISK		SAFE			SAFE	SAFE	SAFE	THIRD
Firefly (Luciole)	Véronique Béliveau	Singer			SAFE		WIN		SAFE		SAFE	SAFE	OUT	
Yéyé Elephant (Éléphante Yéyé)	Maude Guérin	Actress	SAFE			WIN		SAFE		SAFE		SAFE	OUT	
Punk Skunk (Moufette Punkette)	Laurence Jalbert	Singer		SAFE			WIN		SAFE		SAFE	OUT		
Lobster the Sheriff (Homard le Shérif)	Jacques Rougeau	Former professional wrestler			SAFE		RISK		SAFE		OUT			
Mandrill	Stéphane Archambault	Actor		SAFE		RISK		SAFE		OUT				
Hedgehog (Hérisson)	Patrick Norman	Singer			SAFE		RISK		OUT					
Baby Beluga (Bébéluga)	Mariana Mazza	Comedian	SAFE			WIN		OUT						
Phoenix (Phénix)	Robert Piché	Pilot		SAFE			OUT							
Bullfrog (Ouaouaron)	Dany Turcotte	Comedian			SAFE	OUT								
Foxy (Renarde)	Monique Jérôme-Forget	Politician			OUT									
Chinese Pie (Pâté Chinois)	Mathieu Baron	Actor		OUT										
Cocktail Tiki	Denise Bombardier	Journalist	OUT											

The masked singer was safe from elimination.
The masked singer was eliminated from the competition and unmasked upon their elimination.
The masked singer did not perform.

== Episodes ==
=== Episode 1 (18 September) ===
Performances on the first episode
#	Stage name	Song	Identity	Result
1	Yéyé Elephant	"I Lost My Baby" by Jean Leloup	undisclosed	SAFE
2	Baby Beluga	"Tu ne sauras jamais" by Les B.B.	undisclosed	SAFE
3	Cocktail Tiki	"My Way" by Frank Sinatra	Denise Bombardier	OUT
4	Super Otter	"Don't Stop Me Now" by Queen	undisclosed	SAFE
5	Queen of the Day and the Night	"Never Enough" by Loren Allred	undisclosed	SAFE

=== Episode 2 (25 September) ===
Performances on the second episode
#	Stage name	Song	Identity	Result
1	Chinese Pie	"Boum Boum Boum" by Mika	Mathieu Baron	OUT
2	Robot	"Je danse dans ma tête" by Celine Dion	undisclosed	SAFE
3	Punk Skunk	"Hit Me with Your Best Shot" by Pat Benatar	undisclosed	SAFE
4	Mandrill	"Dans la forêt des mal-aimés" by Pierre Lapointe	undisclosed	SAFE
5	Phoenix	"Sweet Dreams (Are Made of This)" by Eurythmics	undisclosed	SAFE

=== Episode 3 (2 October) ===
Performances on the third episode
#	Stage name	Song	Identity	Result
1	Lobster the Sheriff	"Jailhouse Rock" by Elvis Presley	undisclosed	SAFE
2	Bullfrog	"The Frog Song" by Robert Charlebois	undisclosed	SAFE
3	Foxy	"Man! I Feel Like a Woman!" by Shania Twain	Monique Jérôme-Forget	OUT
4	Hedgehog	"Loin, loin de la ville" by Georges Thurston	undisclosed	SAFE
5	Firefly	"The Edge of Glory" by Lady Gaga	undisclosed	SAFE

=== Episode 4 (9 October) ===
Performances on the fourth episode
#	Stage name	Song	Identity	Result
1	Yéyé Elephant	"Respect" by Aretha Franklin	undisclosed	WIN
2	Bullfrog	"Mistral gagnant" by Renaud	Dany Turcotte	OUT
3	Mandrill	"You Sexy Thing" by Hot Chocolate	undisclosed	RISK
4	Baby Beluga	"Torn" by Natalie Imbruglia	undisclosed	WIN
5	Super Otter	"La Tribu de Dana" by Manau	undisclosed	RISK
6	Queen of the Day and the Night	"Entre l'ombre et la lumière" by Marie Carmen	undisclosed	WIN

=== Episode 5 (16 October) ===
Performances on the fifth episode
#	Stage name	Song	Identity	Result
1	Lobster the Sheriff	"Hélène" by Roch Voisine	undisclosed	RISK
2	Robot	"Video Killed the Radio Star" by The Buggles	undisclosed	WIN
3	Firefly	"L'envie d'aimer" by Daniel Lévi	undisclosed	WIN
4	Hedgehog	"Can't Get Enough of Your Love, Babe" by Barry White	undisclosed	RISK
5	Phoenix	"Le coeur est un oiseau" by Richard Desjardins	Robert Piché	OUT
6	Punk Skunk	"Time to Say Goodbye" by Andrea Bocelli & Sarah Brightman	undisclosed	WIN

=== Episode 6 (23 October) ===
Performances on the sixth episode
#	Stage name	Song	Identity	Result
1	Queen of the Day and the Night	"Chandelier" by Sia	undisclosed	SAFE
2	Mandrill	"1990" by Jean Leloup	undisclosed	SAFE
3	Baby Beluga	"I'm Like a Bird" by Nelly Furtado	Mariana Mazza	OUT
4	Super Otter	"Blinding Lights" by The Weeknd	undisclosed	SAFE
5	Yéyé Elephant	"Lady Marmalade" by Labelle	undisclosed	SAFE

=== Episode 7 (30 October) ===
Performances on the seventh episode
#	Stage name	Song	Identity	Result
1	Firefly	"Levitating" by Dua Lipa feat. DaBaby	undisclosed	SAFE
2	Lobster the Sheriff	"Old Town Road" by Lil Nas X & Billy Ray Cyrus	undisclosed	SAFE
3	Punk Skunk	"Andy" by Les Rita Mitsouko	undisclosed	SAFE
4	Hedgehog	"Tension Attention" by Daniel Lavoie	Patrick Norman	OUT
5	Robot	"Fix You" by Coldplay	undisclosed	SAFE

=== Episode 8 (6 November) ===
- Group Performance: "Le Bal Masqué" by La Compagnie Créole

Performances on the eighth episode
#	Stage name	Song	Identity	Result
1	Queen of the Day and the Night	"Le Temps des cathédrales" by Bruno Pelletier	undisclosed	SAFE
2	Yéyé Elephant	"Black Velvet" by Alannah Myles	undisclosed	SAFE
3	Robot	"Dis Moi, Dis Moi" by Mitsou	undisclosed	SAFE
4	Mandrill	"I'm Still Standing" by Elton John	Stéphane Archambault	OUT

=== Episode 9 (13 November) ===
- Guest performance: "Alone" by Heart performed by Nick Carter as Sphynx Cat and "I Want It That Way" performed out of costume.

Performances on the ninth episode
#	Stage name	Song	Identity	Result
1	Super Otter	"Aimer D'amour" by Georges Thurston	undisclosed	SAFE
2	Punk Skunk	"Girls Just Want to Have Fun" by Cyndi Lauper	undisclosed	SAFE
3	Firefly	"Tandem" by Vanessa Paradis	undisclosed	SAFE
4	Lobster the Sheriff	"Take Me Home, Country Roads" by John Denver	Jacques Rougeau	OUT

=== Episode 10 (20 November) ===
Performances on the tenth episode
#	Stage name	Song	Identity	Result
1	Firefly	"Wrecking Ball" by Miley Cyrus	undisclosed	SAFE
2	Punk Skunk	"The Rose" by Bette Midler	Laurence Jalbert	OUT
3	Super Otter	"Femme Like U" by K. Maro	undisclosed	SAFE
4	Queen of the Day and the Night	"Alegría" by Cirque du Soleil	undisclosed	SAFE
5	Yéyé Elephant	"Animal" by France D'Amour	undisclosed	SAFE
6	Robot	"Where Is the Love?" by Black Eyed Peas	undisclosed	SAFE

=== Episode 11 (27 November) ===
Performances on the eleventh episode
#	Stage name	Song	Identity	Result
1	Robot	"Firework" by Katy Perry	undisclosed	SAFE
2	Yéyé Elephant	"Une femme avec toi" by Nicole Croisille	Maude Guérin	OUT
3	Super Otter	"Miami" by Ariane Moffat	undisclosed	SAFE
4	Firefly	"We Belong" by Pat Benatar	Véronique Béliveau	OUT
5	Queen of the Day and the Night	"I'm Every Woman" by Whitney Houston	undisclosed	SAFE

=== Episode 12 (4 December) ===
Group Performance: "The Winner Takes It All" by ABBA (With guest appearance from final 3 from Season 1: Johanne Blouin (Wedding Owl), Jason Roy Léveillée (Black Turkey) and Wilfred Le Bouthillier & Marie-Élaine Thibert (Lovebirds))

Performances on the twelfth episode
#	Stage name	Song	Identity	Result
1	Super Otter	"Ça plane pour moi" by Plastic Bertrand	Pierre-Yves Lord	THIRD
2	Robot	"What About Us" by Pink	Ludovick Bourgeois	RUNNER-UP
3	Queen of the Day and the Night	"Tous les cris les S.O.S." by Daniel Balavoine	Véronique Claveau	WINNER

== Season 3 ==
Stage name	Celebrity	Occupation	Episodes											
Stage name	Celebrity	Occupation	1	2	3	4	5	6	7	8	9	10	11	12
Chameleon (Caméléon)	Michel Courtemanche	Comedian			SAFE		RISK	SAFE		SAFE		SAFE	SAFE	WINNER
Mutante Rita	Marie Denise Pelletier	Singer	SAFE			WIN			SAFE	SAFE		SAFE	SAFE	RUNNER-UP
Lion	Rita Baga	Drag queen		SAFE			WIN	SAFE			SAFE	SAFE	SAFE	THIRD
Wolf (Loup)	Mario Pelchat	Singer							SAFE	SAFE		SAFE	SAFE	FINALIST
Ice Ballerina (Ballerine de Glace)	Julie Ringuette	Actress			SAFE		WIN	SAFE			SAFE	SAFE	OUT	
Lovers (Amoureux)	Élyse Marquis	Actress			SAFE	WIN		SAFE			SAFE	OUT		
Lovers (Amoureux)	Joël Legendre	Presenter			SAFE	WIN		SAFE			SAFE	OUT		
Astronaut (Astronaute)	Damien Robitaille	Singer			SAFE		WIN		SAFE		OUT			
Doll (Poupée)	Mahée Paiement	Actress		SAFE		RISK			SAFE	OUT				
Lady Greyhound (Lady Lévrier)	Patrice L'Écuyer	Actor	SAFE			WIN			OUT					
Agent 00 - Penguin (Agent 00 - Pingouin)	Erik Caouette	Singer	SAFE			RISK			OUT					
Dinosaur (Dinosaure)	Alain Dumas	Singer	SAFE				RISK	OUT						
Orange Cone (Cône Orange)	Mathieu Dufour	Comedian		SAFE			OUT							
Loon (Huard)	Édith Butler	Singer		SAFE		OUT								
Dragon	David Morissette	Former hockey player			OUT									
Popcorn	Soeur Angèle	Nun		OUT										
Seahorse (Hippocampe)	Fabienne Larouche	Producer	OUT											

== Episodes ==
=== Week 1 (17 September) ===
Performances on the first episode
#	Stage name	Song	Identity	Result
1	Dinosaur	"Never Gonna Give You Up" by Rick Astley	undisclosed	SAFE
2	Lady Greyhound	"Tico-Tico no Fubá" by Alys Robi/"Queen of the Night Aria" from The Magic Flute/"Chica Chica Boom Chic" by Alys Robi	undisclosed	SAFE
3	Agent 00 - Penguin	"L’Espion" by Michel Pagliaro	undisclosed	SAFE
4	Seahorse	"River Deep, Mountain High" by Ike & Tina Turner	Fabienne Larouche	OUT
5	Mutante Rita	"Bring Me to Life" by Evanescence	undisclosed	SAFE

=== Week 2 (24 September) ===
Performances on the second episode
#	Stage name	Song	Identity	Result
1	Orange Cone	"Life Is a Highway" by Rascal Flatts	undisclosed	SAFE
2	Loon	"Marcia Baïla" by Les Rita Mitsouko	undisclosed	SAFE
3	Doll	"On ne change pas" by Celine Dion	undisclosed	SAFE
4	Popcorn	"Pied de Poule" by Dolbie Stéréo	Soeur Angèle	OUT
5	Lion	"Nature Boy" by Nat King Cole/"El Tango De Roxanne" by Ewan McGregor, Jacek Koman & José Feliciano	undisclosed	SAFE

=== Week 3 (1 October) ===
Performances on the third episode
#	Stage name	Song	Identity	Result
1	Astronaut	"The Final Countdown" by Europe	undisclosed	SAFE
2	Dragon	"Allumer Le Feu" by Johnny Hallyday	David Morissette	OUT
3	Ice Ballerina	"Faufile" by Charlotte Cardin	undisclosed	SAFE
4	Chameleon	"Sex Bomb" by Tom Jones & Mousse T.	undisclosed	SAFE
5	Lovers	"Tous Les Garçons et Les Filles" by Françoise Hardy	undisclosed	SAFE
5	Lovers	"Tous Les Garçons et Les Filles" by Françoise Hardy	undisclosed	SAFE

=== Week 4 (8 October) ===
Performances on the fourth episode
#	Stage name	Song	Identity	Result
1	Mutante Rita	"Vivante" by France D'Amour	undisclosed	WIN
2	Doll	"Flashdance... What a Feeling" by Irene Cara	undisclosed	RISK
3	Lady Greyhound	"Oxygène" by Jean-Michel Jarre/"Tiens-toé Ben, J'arrive" by Diane Dufresne	undisclosed	WIN
4	Loon	"Price Tag" by Jessie J	Édith Butler	OUT
5	Agent 00 - Penguin	"Amalgame" by Les Respectables	undisclosed	RISK
6	Lovers	"Hello" by Adele/Lionel Richie	undisclosed	WIN
6	Lovers	"Hello" by Adele/Lionel Richie	undisclosed	WIN

=== Week 5 (15 October) ===
Performances on the fourth episode
#	Stage name	Song	Identity	Result
1	Chameleon	"Karma Chameleon" by Culture Club	undisclosed	RISK
2	Lion	"Pleurs dans La pluie" by Mario Pelchat	undisclosed	WIN
3	Orange Cone	"Illégal" by Marjo	Mathieu Dufour	OUT
4	Ice Ballerina	"Dancing On My Own" by Robyn	undisclosed	WIN
5	Dinosaur	"Darlin'" by Roch Voisine	undisclosed	RISK
6	Astronaut	"The Scientist" by Coldplay	undisclosed	WIN

=== Episode 6 (22 October) ===
Performances on the sixth episode
#	Stage name	Song	Identity	Result
1	Lovers	"Just Give Me a Reason" by P!nk	undisclosed	SAFE
2	Chameleon	"Fille de personne II" by Hubert Lenoir	undisclosed	SAFE
3	Lion	"Try" by P!nk	undisclosed	SAFE
4	Dinosaur	"U Can't Touch This" by MC Hammer	Alain Dumas	OUT
5	Ice Ballerina	"Si Tu M'aimes" by Lara Fabian	undisclosed	SAFE

=== Week 7 (29 October) ===
- Guest performance : Hymne à la beauté du monde/A Million Dreams sung by Véronic DiCaire

Performances on the seventh episode
#	Stage name	Song	Identity	Result
Wildcard	Wolf	"Everybody (Backstreet's Back)" by Backstreet Boys	undisclosed	SAFE
2	Agent 00 - Penguin	"Toxic" by Britney Spears	Erik Caouette	OUT
3	Lady Greyhound	"Belle Nuit, Ô Nuit D’amour"/"La voix que j’ai" by Jacques Offenbach	Patrice L’Écuyer	OUT
4	Astronaut	"Formidable"/"Papaoutai" by Stromae	undisclosed	SAFE
5	Doll	"Memory" by Barbra Streisand	undisclosed	SAFE
6	Mutante Rita	"Rolling in the Deep" by Adele	undisclosed	SAFE

=== Week 8 (5 November) ===
Performances on the eighth episode
#	Stage name	Song	Identity	Result
1	Wolf	"I Want to Break Free" by Queen	undisclosed	SAFE
2	Doll	"Évidemment" by France Gall	Mahée Paiement	OUT
3	Chameleon	"Louxor J'Adore" by Philippe Katerine	undisclosed	SAFE
4	Mutante Rita	"Juice" by Lizzo	undisclosed	SAFE

=== Week 9 (12 November) : Eighties Night ===
- Guest performance "Touch Me" sung by Samantha Fox

Performances on the ninth episode
#	Stage name	Song	Identity	Result
1	Lion	"Rhythm of the Night" by DeBarge	undisclosed	SAFE
2	Astronaut	"Voyage, voyage" by Desireless	Damien Robitaille	OUT
3	Lovers	"Listen to Your Heart" by Roxette	undisclosed	SAFE
4	Ice Ballerina	"Danse avec moi"/"Ce soir l'amour est dans tes yeux" by Martine St. Clair	undisclosed	SAFE

=== Week 10 (19 November) ===
Performances on the tenth episode
#	Stage name	Song	Identity	Result
1	Ice Ballerina	"Hot Stuff" by Donna Summer	undisclosed	SAFE
2	Chameleon	"Déjeuner en paix" by Stephan Eicher	undisclosed	SAFE
3	Lion	"Je ne suis qu'une chanson" by Ginette Reno	undisclosed	SAFE
4	Lovers	"You're the One That I Want" by John Travolta & Olivia Newton-John	Élyse Marquis	OUT
4	Lovers	"You're the One That I Want" by John Travolta & Olivia Newton-John	Joël Legendre	OUT
5	Mutante Rita	"Ordinaire" by Céline Dion	undisclosed	SAFE
6	Wolf	"Too Much Heaven"/"Tragedy" by Bee Gees	undisclosed	SAFE

=== Week 11 (26 November) ===
Performances on the eleventh episode
#	Stage name	Song	Identity	Result
1	Ice Ballerina	"I Wanna Dance With Somebody" by Whitney Houston	Julie Ringuette	OUT
2	Lion	"Feeling Good" by Nina Simone	undisclosed	SAFE
3	Wolf	"Il Est Où Le Bonheur" by Christophe Maé	undisclosed	SAFE
4	Chameleon	"Ça m'énerve" by Helmut Fritz	undisclosed	SAFE
5	Mutante Rita	"Bohemian Rhapsody" by Queen	undisclosed	SAFE

=== Week 12 (3 December) - Finale ===
Performances on the twelfth episode
#	Stage name	Song	Identity	Result
1	Lion	"My Heart Will Go On" by Céline Dion	Rita Baga	THIRD
2	Chameleon	"I'm Too Sexy" by Right Said Fred	Michel Courtemanche	WINNER
3	Wolf	"Ma Gueule" by Johnny Hallyday	Mario Pelchat	FINALIST
4	Mutante Rita	"I Don't Want to Miss a Thing" by Aerosmith	Marie Denise Pelletier	RUNNER-UP

== Season 4 ==
Stage name	Celebrity	Occupation	Episodes										
Stage name	Celebrity	Occupation	1	2	3	4	5	6	7	8	9	10	11
Swan (Cygne)	Gabrielle Destroismaisons	Singer		SAFE			WIN	SAFE			SAFE	SAFE	WINNER
Betty Bett	Julie Bélanger	TV Presenter		SAFE		WIN			SAFE	SAFE		SAFE	RUNNER-UP
Zebra (Zèbre)	Benoît McGinnis	Actor	SAFE				WIN		SAFE	SAFE		SAFE	THIRD
Rhino	Jonas Tomalty	Singer	SAFE			WIN		SAFE			SAFE	OUT	
Miss Maize (Miss Maïs)	Martine St. Clair	Singer			SAFE	RISK		SAFE			OUT		
Unicorn (Licorne)	Debbie Lynch-White	Actress	SAFE				RISK		SAFE	OUT			
Owl (Hibou)	Félix-Antoine Tremblay	Actor			SAFE		WIN		OUT				
Sun (Soleil)	Cathy Gauthier	Comedian		SAFE			RISK	OUT					
Duke Mallard (Duc Colvert)	Pierre Bruneau	Journalist			SAFE		OUT						
Baby Mammoth (Bébé Mammouth)	Marthe Laverdière	Horticulturist		SAFE		OUT							
Serge the Llama (Serge le Lama)	Marc-André Coallier	Actor			OUT								
Edgar the Giraffe (Edgar la Girafe)	Jacques L'Heureux	Actor		OUT									
Banana (Banane)	Gino Chouinard	TV Host	OUT										
Jack Spi-Rat	Marc Dupré	Singer											

== Episodes ==
=== Week 1 (15 September) ===
Performances on the first episode
#	Stage name	Song	Identity	Result
1	Zebra	"Aline" by Christophe	undisclosed	SAFE
2	Rhino	"Fly Me to the Moon" by Frank Sinatra	undisclosed	SAFE
3	Banana	"La Rue Principale" by Les Colocs	Gino Chouinard	OUT
4	Unicorn	"She Used to Be Mine" from Waitress: The Musical	undisclosed	SAFE

=== Week 2 (22 September) ===
Performances on the second episode
#	Stage name	Song	Identity	Result
1	Betty Bett	"All That Jazz" by Liza Minnelli	undisclosed	SAFE
2	Edgar the Giraffe	"Splish Splash" by Bobby Darin	Jacques L'Heureux	OUT
3	Sun	"Bang Bang (My Baby Shot Me Down)" by Nancy Sinatra	undisclosed	SAFE
4	Baby Mammoth	"Miami" by Ariane Moffatt	undisclosed	SAFE
5	Swan	"Can't Help Falling in Love" by Elvis Presley	undisclosed	SAFE

=== Week 3 (29 September) ===
Performances on the third episode
#	Stage name	Song	Identity	Result
1	Owl	"...Baby One More Time" by Britney Spears	undisclosed	SAFE
2	Duke Mallard	"Sway" by Michael Bublé	undisclosed	SAFE
3	Serge the Llama	"Les Cactus" by Jacques Dutronc	Marc-André Coallier	OUT
4	Miss Maize	"Miserere" by Zucchero	undisclosed	SAFE

=== Week 4 (6 October) ===
Performances on the fourth episode
#	Stage name	Song	Identity	Result
1	Rhino	"Africa" by Toto	undisclosed	WIN
2	Miss Maize	"Summertime" by Ella Fitzgerald	undisclosed	RISK
3	Baby Mammoth	"Mentir" by Marie-Mai	Marthe Laverdière	OUT
4	Betty Bett	"Lady Marmalade" by Labelle	undisclosed	WIN

=== Week 5 (13 October) ===
Performances on the fifth episode
#	Stage name	Song	Identity	Result
1	Sun	"Non, Je Ne Regrette Rien" by Edith Piaf	undisclosed	RISK
2	Zebra	"Dans Les Yeux D’Émilie" by Joe Dassin	undisclosed	WIN
3	Duke Mallard	"I Was Made for Lovin' You" by Kiss	Pierre Bruneau	OUT
4	Swan	"Pour l'amour qu'il nous reste" by Francine Raymond	undisclosed	WIN
5	Owl	"I'm Just A Kid" by Simple Plan	undisclosed	WIN
6	Unicorn	"J’ai mal à l’amour" by Isabelle Boulay	undisclosed	RISK

=== Week 6 (20 October) ===
Performances on the sixth episode
#	Stage name	Song	Identity	Result
1	Sun	"Padam Padam" by Edith Piaf	Cathy Gauthier	OUT
2	Miss Maize	"Skyfall" by Adele	undisclosed	SAFE
3	Rhino	"Pretty Woman" by Roy Orbison	undisclosed	SAFE
4	Swan	"Délivre-moi" by Céline Dion	undisclosed	SAFE

=== Week 7 (27 October) ===
- Special Performance: "Thriller" by Michael Jackson performed by Jack Spi-Rat.

Performances on the seventh episode
#	Stage name	Song	Identity	Result
1	Unicorn	"Easy on Me" by Adele	undisclosed	SAFE
2	Owl	"Maudit Bordel" by Marie-Chantal Toupin	Félix-Antoine Tremblay	OUT
3	Betty Bett	"Tellement j'ai d'amour pour toi" by Celine Dion	undisclosed	SAFE
4	Zebra	"I Wish" by Stevie Wonder	undisclosed	SAFE

=== Week 8 (3 November) ===
Performances on the eighth episode
#	Stage name	Song	Identity	Result
1	Betty Bett	"Lettre À Un Cowboy"/"Bye Bye Mon Cowboy" by Mitsou (duet with Mitsou)	undisclosed	SAFE
1	Betty Bett	"Bang Bang" by Jessie J, Ariana Grande and Nicki Minaj	undisclosed	SAFE
2	Unicorn	"Vivre Avec Celui Qu'on Aime" by Francine Raymond	Debbie Lynch-White	OUT
3	Zebra	"Encore et Encore" by Francis Cabrel	undisclosed	SAFE

=== Week 9 (10 November) ===
Performances on the ninth episode
#	Stage name	Song	Identity	Result
1	Miss Maize	"Paroles, Paroles"/"Gigi L'Amoroso"/"Monday, Tuesday… Laissez‐moi Danser" by Dalida	Martine St. Clair	OUT
2	Rhino	"Uptown Funk" by Mark Ronson feat. Bruno Mars	undisclosed	SAFE
3	Swan	"L'Aigle Noir" by Barbara	undisclosed	SAFE
3	Swan	"Changer" by Jean-François Breau & Marie-Ève Janvier (duet with Marie-Ève Janvier)	undisclosed	SAFE

=== Week 10 (17 November) ===
- Special Performance: "The Show Must Go On" by Queen performed by Marc Dupré as Jack Spi-Rat

Performances on the tenth episode
#	Stage name	Song	Identity	Result
1	Swan	"We're Not Gonna Take It" by Twisted Sister	undisclosed	SAFE
2	Rhino	"Grace Kelly" by MIKA	Jonas Tomalty	OUT
3	Betty Bett	"Je Voudrais Voir New York" by Daniel Lavoie	undisclosed	SAFE
4	Zebra	"I Surrender" by Celine Dion	undisclosed	SAFE

=== Week 11 (24 November) ===
- Group performance: "Salut les amoureux" by Joe Dassin (Quartet with Mélissa Bédard)

Performances on the eleventh episode
#	Stage name	Song	Identity	Result
1	Zebra	"Somebody to Love" by Queen	Benoît McGinnis	THIRD
2	Betty Bett	"Proud Mary" by Tina Turner	Julie Bélanger	RUNNER-UP
3	Swan	"Une Chance Qu'on S'a" by Jean-Pierre Ferland	Gabrielle Destroismaisons	WINNER

== Season 5 ==
Stage name	Celebrity	Occupation	Episodes										
Stage name	Celebrity	Occupation	1	2	3	4	5	6	7	8	9	10	11
Cardinal	Steph Carse	Singer			SAFE	WIN (Note: While Cardinal lost the audience vote, the panel had immediately chosen to save Cardinal from the Bottom 3, making both them and Cari-Belle safe.)		SAFE		SAFE		SAFE	WINNER
Cari-Belle	Marilou	Singer	SAFE			WIN		SAFE		SAFE		SAFE	RUNNER-UP
Renardo	William Cloutier	Singer/Actor		SAFE			WIN		SAFE		SAFE	SAFE	THIRD
Witch (Sorcière)	Marie-Ève Janvier	Singer	SAFE				WIN		SAFE	SAFE		SAFE	FINALIST
Shooting Star (Étoile Filante)	Léane Labrèche-Dor	Actress			SAFE	WIN			SAFE		SAFE	OUT	
Axel the Axolotl (Axel l'Axolotl)	Clodine Desrochers	Actress	SAFE				WIN	SAFE			SAFE	OUT	
Cyclops (Cyclope)	Guy Jodoin	Comedian		SAFE			RISK		SAFE		OUT		
Space Tigress (Tigresse de L'espace)	Joe Bocan	Singer		SAFE			RISK	SAFE		OUT			
Mr. Pickle (Monsieur Cornichon)	Boom Desjardins	Singer			SAFE	RISK			OUT				
Na-poulet-on	Jean-Marc Généreux	TV Personality		SAFE		WIN		OUT					
Germaine Pigeon	Marie-Lise Pilote	Comedian/Actress	SAFE				OUT						
Camel (Chameau)	Bibi & Geneviève	Puppet & Actress			SAFE	OUT							
Hippopo-Dame	Georges Laraque	Hockey Player			OUT								
Starfish (Étoile de Mer)	Sylvie Fréchette	Swimmer		OUT									
Buck the Lumberjack (Buck le Bûcheron)	Claude Poirier	Negotiator	OUT										

== Episodes ==
=== Week 1 (14 September) ===
Performances on the first episode
#	Stage name	Song	Identity	Result
1	Cari-Belle	"Hero" by Mariah Carey	undisclosed	SAFE
2	Germaine Pigeon	"J'ai-tu l'air de que'qu'un qui a déjà gagné que'qu'chose?" by Ariane Moffatt	undisclosed	SAFE
3	Buck the Lumberjack	"Le bon gars" by Richard Desjardins	Claude Poirier	OUT
4	Axel the Axolotl	"La Vie en rose" by Édith Piaf	undisclosed	SAFE
5	Witch	"Going Under" by Evanescence	undisclosed	SAFE

=== Week 2 (21 September) ===
Performances on the second episode
#	Stage name	Song	Identity	Result
1	Cyclops	"La Vie Est Laide" by Jean Leloup	undisclosed	SAFE
2	Na-poulet-on	"Et Maintenant" by Gilbert Bécaud	undisclosed	SAFE
3	Starfish	"Je Voudrais Voir La Mer" by Michel Rivard/"Tout Nu Sur La Plage" by Les Trois Accords	Sylvie Fréchette	OUT
4	Space Tigress	"Unstoppable" by Sia	undisclosed	SAFE
5	Renardo	"I See Red" by Everybody Loves An Outlaw	undisclosed	SAFE

=== Week 3 (28 September) ===
Performances on the third episode
#	Stage name	Song	Identity	Result
1	Shooting Star	"Take a Chance on Me" by ABBA / "Hung Up" by Madonna / "Gimme! Gimme! Gimme!" by ABBA	undisclosed	SAFE
2	Camel	"Rêver Mieux" by Daniel Bélanger	undisclosed	SAFE
3	Mr. Pickle	"Hier Encore" by Les Enfoirés / "Emmenez-Moi" by Charles Aznavour	undisclosed	SAFE
4	Hippopo-Dame	"I'm Sexy and I Know It" by LMFAO	Georges Laraque	OUT
5	Cardinal	"Ameno" by Era / "All by Myself" by Céline Dion	undisclosed	SAFE

=== Week 4 (5 October) ===
Performances on the fourth episode
#	Stage name	Song	Identity	Result
1	Mr. Pickle	"Loin loin de la ville" by Georges Thurston	undisclosed	RISK
2	Na-poulet-on	"Attention mesdames et messieurs" by Le Big Bazar and Michel Fugain	undisclosed	WIN
3	Camel	"J'ai demandé à la lune" by Indochine	Bibi & Geneviève	OUT
4	Shooting Star	"Oops!... I Did It Again" by Britney Spears	undisclosed	WIN
5	Cari-Belle	"Greatest Love of All" by Whitney Houston	undisclosed	WIN
6	Cardinal	"I'd Do Anything for Love (But I Won't Do That)" by Meat Loaf	undisclosed	WIN

=== Week 5 (12 October) ===
Performances on the fifth episode
#	Stage name	Song	Identity	Result
1	Space Tigress	"The Edge of Glory" by Lady Gaga	undisclosed	RISK
2	Renardo	"Dans un autre monde" by Celine Dion	undisclosed	WIN
3	Axel the Axolotl	"Mon mec à moi" by Patricia Kaas	undisclosed	WIN
4	Germaine Pigeon	"Bobépine" by Éric Lapointe	Marie-Lise Pilote	OUT
5	Witch	"Oxygène" by Diane Dufresne	undisclosed	WIN
6	Cyclops	"Imparfait" by Daniel Bélanger	undisclosed	RISK

=== Week 6 (19 October) ===
Performances on the sixth episode
#	Stage name	Song	Identity	Result
1	Axel the Axolotl	"Humana" by Lara Fabian	undisclosed	SAFE
2	Na-poulet-on	"J'entends frapper" by Michel Pagliaro	Jean-Marc Généreux	OUT
3	Cardinal	"Never Enough" by Loren Allred	undisclosed	SAFE
4	Space Tigress	"Physical" by Dua Lipa	undisclosed	SAFE
5	Cari-Belle	"Encore et encore" by Francis Cabrel	undisclosed	SAFE

=== Week 7 (26 October) ===
Performances on the seventh episode
#	Stage name	Song	Identity	Result
1	Shooting Star	"Conga" by Gloria Estefan and Miami Sound Machine	undisclosed	SAFE
2	Renardo	"Livin' on a Prayer" by Bon Jovi (duet with Mario Pelchat as the Wolf)	undisclosed	SAFE
3	Mr. Pickle	"Je suis un Chanteur" by Mario Pelchat	Boom Desjardins	OUT
4	Cyclops	"Mauvais Caractère" by Les Colocs	undisclosed	SAFE
5	Witch	"Abracadabra" By Lady Gaga	undisclosed	SAFE

=== Week 8 (2 November) ===
Performances on the eighth episode
#	Stage name	Song	Identity	Result
1	Cari-Belle	"Foolish Games" by Jewel	undisclosed	SAFE
2	Space Tigress	"J’ai vu" by Niagara	Joe Bocan	OUT
3	Cardinal	"Time to Say Goodbye" by Andrea Bocelli	undisclosed	SAFE
3	Cardinal	"I'll Always Be There" by Roch Voisine (duet with Roch Voisine)	undisclosed	SAFE
4	Witch	"Animal" by France D'Amour	undisclosed	SAFE
4	Witch	"Que je t'aime" by Johnny Hallyday (duet with Sylvain Cossette)	undisclosed	SAFE

=== Week 9 (9 November) ===
Performances on the ninth episode
#	Stage name	Song	Identity	Result
1	Renardo	"Hot Stuff" by Donna Summer	undisclosed	SAFE
2	Cyclops	"Born to Be Alive" by Patrick Hernandez	Guy Jodoin	OUT
3	Axel the Axolotl	"I Love to Love" by Tina Charles	undisclosed	SAFE
4	Shooting Star	"Laissez-moi Danser" by Dalida	undisclosed	SAFE

=== Week 10 (16 November) ===
Performances on the tenth episode
#	Stage name	Song	Identity	Result
1	Cari-Belle	"It's All Coming Back to Me Now" by Celine Dion	undisclosed	SAFE
2	Shooting Star	"It's Raining Men" by The Weather Girls	Léane Labrèche-Dor	OUT
3	Cardinal	"Hymne à l'amour" by Édith Piaf	undisclosed	SAFE
4	Axel the Axolotl	"Tomber à l'eau" by Annie Villeneuve	Clodine Desrochers	OUT
5	Renardo	"Everybody (Backstreet's Back)" by Backstreet Boys	undisclosed	SAFE
6	Witch	"Les idées noires" by Julie Masse	undisclosed	SAFE

=== Week 11 (23 November) ===
Performances on the eleventh episode
#	Stage name	Song	Identity	Result
1	Witch	"Un peu plus haut, Un peu plus loin" by Ginette Reno	Marie-Ève Janvier	FINALIST
2	Renardo	"Who I Am" by Wyn Starks	William Cloutier	THIRD
3	Cardinal	"Wind Beneath My Wings" by Bette Midler	Steph Carse	WINNER
4	Cari-Belle	"Ne partez pas sans moi" by Celine Dion	Marilou	RUNNER-UP

== Season 6 ==
Stage name	Celebrity	Occupation	Episodes										
Stage name	Celebrity	Occupation	1	2	3	4	5	6	7	8	9	10	11
Cat Top (Chat-Piteau)	TBA		SAFE			WIN		SAFE		SAFE		SAFE	TBA
Diva Cobra	TBA				SAFE		WIN	SAFE			SAFE	SAFE	TBA
Intra-Man	TBA		SAFE				WIN		SAFE	SAFE		SAFE	TBA
Ship (Caravelle)	TBA			SAFE		WIN		SAFE		SAFE		SAFE	TBA
Miss Peacock (Miss Paon)	Katherine Levac	Comedian		SAFE			WIN		SAFE		SAFE	OUT	
Man of Mirrors (Homme de Miroirs)	Paul Sarrasin	Actor		SAFE		RISK		SAFE			OUT		
Zebra (Zèbra)	Ève Landry	Actress		SAFE		RISK			SAFE	OUT			
Volcania	Sonia Vachon	Actress			SAFE		RISK		OUT				
Tibébi	Ariane Moffatt	Singer	SAFE			WIN			OUT				
Cowboy Hare (Lièvre Cowboy)	Mario Tessier	Comedian			SAFE		RISK	OUT					
Samba	Josée Lavigueur	TV Host	SAFE				OUT						
Colonel Pug	Yves Pelletier	Director			SAFE	OUT							
Falcon (Faucon)	Paul Larocque	Journalist			OUT								
Queen (Reine)	Nathalie Petrowski	Journalist		OUT									
Miss Tick-Tock (Mademoiselle Tic-Tac)	Marie Eykel	Actress	OUT										
Question Mark (Point d'Interrogation)	Mathieu Baron	Actor											
Question Mark (Point d'Interrogation)	Jean-Philippe Dion	TV Host											
Question Mark (Point d'Interrogation)	Michaël Girard	Singer											
Question Mark (Point d'Interrogation)	Michèle Richard	Singer											
Question Mark (Point d'Interrogation)	Allan Théo	Singer											

== Episodes ==
=== Week 1 (13 September) ===
Performances on the first episode
#	Stage name	Song	Identity	Result
1	Cat Top	"Les uns contre les autres" by Fabienne Thibeault	undisclosed	SAFE
2	Samba	"Des croissants de soleil" by Ginette Reno	undisclosed	SAFE
3	Tibébi	"What Was I Made For?" by Billie Eilish	undisclosed	SAFE
4	Miss Tick-Tock	"Le temps est bon" by Bon Entendeur and Isabelle Pierre	Marie Eykel	OUT
5	Intra-Man	"Believer" by Imagine Dragons	undisclosed	SAFE

=== Week 2 (20 September) ===
Performances on the second episode
#	Stage name	Song	Identity	Result
1	Zebra	"River Deep, Mountain High" by Tina Turner	undisclosed	SAFE
2	Miss Peacock	"Fous n'importe où" by Daniel Bélanger	undisclosed	SAFE
3	Man of Mirrors	"Angels" by Robbie Williams	undisclosed	SAFE
4	Queen	"Dans la forêt des mal-aimés" by Pierre Lapointe	Nathalie Petrowski	OUT
5	Ship	"Fight Song" by Rachel Platten	undisclosed	SAFE

=== Week 3 (27 September) ===
Performances on the third episode
#	Stage name	Song	Identity	Result
1	Cowboy Hare	"Chicken Fried" by Zac Brown Band	undisclosed	SAFE
2	Falcon	"La Dame en bleu" by Michel Louvain	Paul Larocque	OUT
3	Volcania	"Emmène-moi" by Marie-Mai	undisclosed	SAFE
4	Colonel Pug	"On est né nu" by Damien Robitaille	undisclosed	SAFE
5	Diva Cobra	"Bad Romance" by Lady Gaga	undisclosed	SAFE

=== Week 4 (4 October) ===
- Guest Performance: "Feeling Good" by Nina Simone performed by Mathieu Baron as Question mark

Performances on the fourth episode
#	Stage name	Song	Identity	Result
1	Ship	"Bring Me to Life" by Evanescence	undisclosed	WIN
2	Colonel Pug	"Une belle histoire" by Michel Fugain	Yves Pelletier	OUT
3	Tibébi	"Call Your Girlfriend" by Robyn	undisclosed	WIN
4	Man of Mirrors	"Les Temps fous" by Daniel Bélanger	undisclosed	RISK
5	Zebra	"Shame on U" by Ophélie Winter	undisclosed	RISK
6	Cat Top	"Les Soirs de scotch" by Luce Dufault	undisclosed	WIN

=== Week 5 (11 October) ===
- Guest Performance: "Pleurs dans la pluie" by Mario Pelchat performed by Jean-Philippe Dion as Question mark

Performances on the fifth episode
#	Stage name	Song	Identity	Result
1	Volcania	"Je n'irai pas ailleurs" by France D'Amour	undisclosed	RISK
2	Miss Peacock	"Everytime" by Britney Spears	undisclosed	WIN
3	Cowboy Hare	"That's All Right" by Elvis Presley	undisclosed	RISK
4	Intra-Man	"Tout l'or des hommes" by Celine Dion	undisclosed	WIN
5	Samba	"Billy" by Julie Masse	Josée Lavigueur	OUT
6	Diva Cobra	"Alive" by Sia	undisclosed	WIN

=== Week 6 : Musical Night (18 October) ===
- Guest Performance: "Circle of Life" from The Lion King performed by Michaël Girard as Question mark

Performances on the sixth episode
#	Stage name	Song	Identity	Result
1	Diva Cobra	"Ce soir on danse à Naziland" from Starmania	undisclosed	SAFE
2	Man of Mirrors	"Le temps des cathédrales" from Notre-Dame de Paris	undisclosed	SAFE
3	Cowboy Hare	"Du plaisir" from Don Juan	Mario Tessier	OUT
4	Cat Top	"Cabaret" from Cabaret	undisclosed	SAFE
5	Ship	"Defying Gravity" from Wicked	undisclosed	SAFE

=== Week 7 (25 October) ===
Performances on the seventh episode
#	Stage name	Song	Identity	Result
1	Intra-Man	"What About Us" by P!nk	undisclosed	SAFE
2	Miss Peacock	"Corridor" by Laurence Jalbert	undisclosed	SAFE
3	Zebra	"Saisir le jour" by Lara Fabian	undisclosed	SAFE
4	Volcania	"Entre l'ombre et la lumière" by Marie Carmen	Sonia Vachon	OUT
5	Tibébi	"Toxic" by Britney Spears	Ariane Moffatt	OUT

=== Week 8 : Duet Night (1 November) ===
- Guest Performance: "Abracadabra" by Lady Gaga performed by Michèle Richard as Question mark

Performances on the eighth episode
#	Stage name	Song	Duet Partner	Identity	Result
1	Ship	"Tous les cris les SOS" by Daniel Balavoine	Marie Denise Pelletier	undisclosed	SAFE
2	Zebra	"Illégal" by Marjo	Marjo	Ève Landry	OUT
3	Intra-Man	"Seul au combat" by Les B.B.	Ludovick Bourgeois	undisclosed	SAFE
4	Cat Top	"Un ange qui passe" by Annie Villeneuve	Annie Villeneuve	undisclosed	SAFE

=== Week 9 (8 November) ===
- Guest Performance: "I Don't Want to Miss a Thing" by Aerosmith performed by Allan Théo as Question mark and "Dis-moi, dis-moi" by Mitsou / "(You Drive Me) Crazy" by Britney Spears performed by Anouk Meunier

Performances on the ninth episode
#	Stage name	Song	Identity	Result
1	Diva Cobra	"N'importe quoi" by Éric Lapointe	undisclosed	SAFE
2	Miss Peacock	"Torn" by Natalie Imbruglia	undisclosed	SAFE
3	Man of Mirrors	"Wonderwall" by Oasis	Paul Sarrasin	OUT

=== Week 10 (15 November) ===
Performances on the tenth episode
#	Stage name	Song	Identity	Result
1	Cat Top	"Un-Break My Heart" by Toni Braxton	undisclosed	SAFE
2	Diva Cobra	"Amoureuse" by Marjo	undisclosed	SAFE
3	Ship	"Bird Set Free" by Sia	undisclosed	SAFE
4	Miss Peacock	"Feel Happy" by Véronic DiCaire	Katherine Levac	OUT
5	Intra-Man	"Voyager sans toi" by Mario Pelchat	undisclosed	SAFE

=== Week 11 (22 November) ===
- Group performance: "The Best" by Tina Turner (Quintet with TBA)

Performances on the eleventh episode
#	Stage name	Song	Identity	Result
1	TBA	TBA	undisclosed	TBA
2	TBA	TBA	undisclosed	TBA
3	TBA	TBA	undisclosed	TBA
4	TBA	TBA	undisclosed	TBA
