= Gatineau Hot Air Balloon Festival =

Coordinates: 45°29′N 75°39′W

250pxl

The Gatineau Hot Air Balloon Festival (French: Festival de Montgolfières de Gatineau) is an annual festival held in Gatineau, Quebec, Canada, and organized by a not-for-profit organization, during which hot air balloons of every shape and colour are flown and where 300 shows and performances adding up to over 60 hours’ worth of programming are taking place. More than 200,000 visitors and 1,000 RVs usually participate. It is held over four days in late-August and early September during the Labor Day Weekend.

== History ==
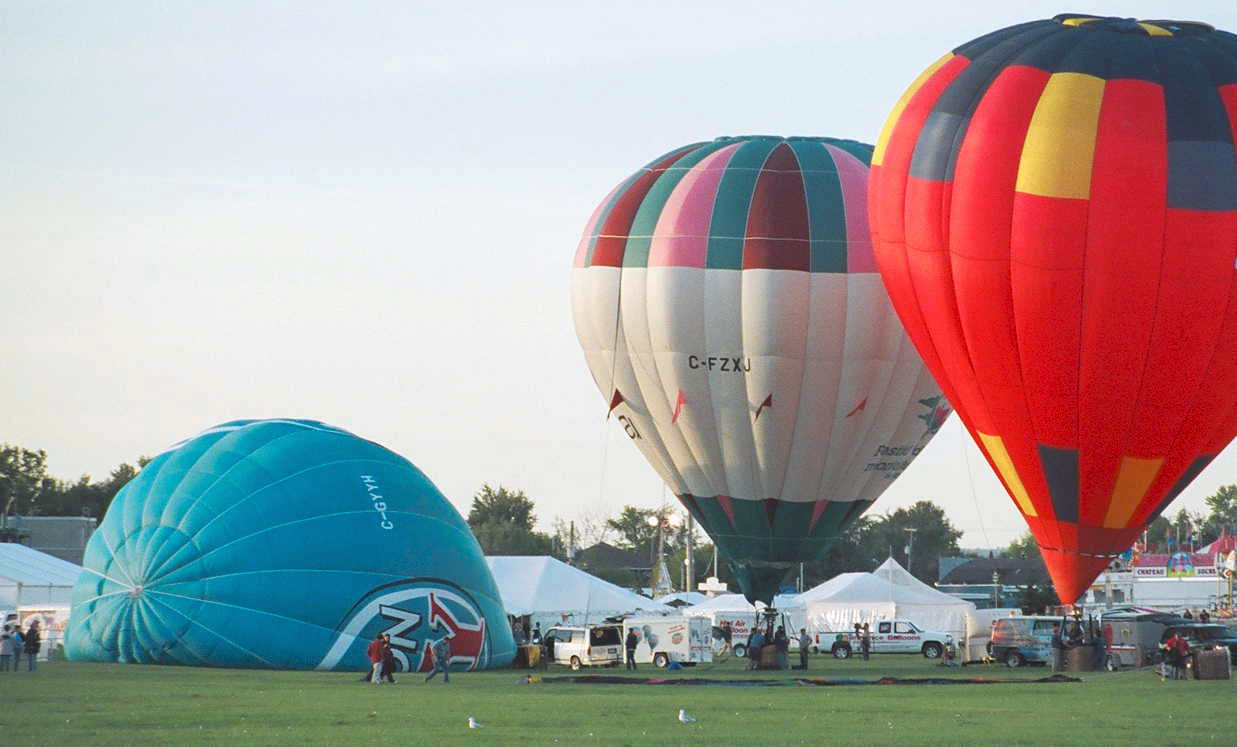
Filling balloons for the festival

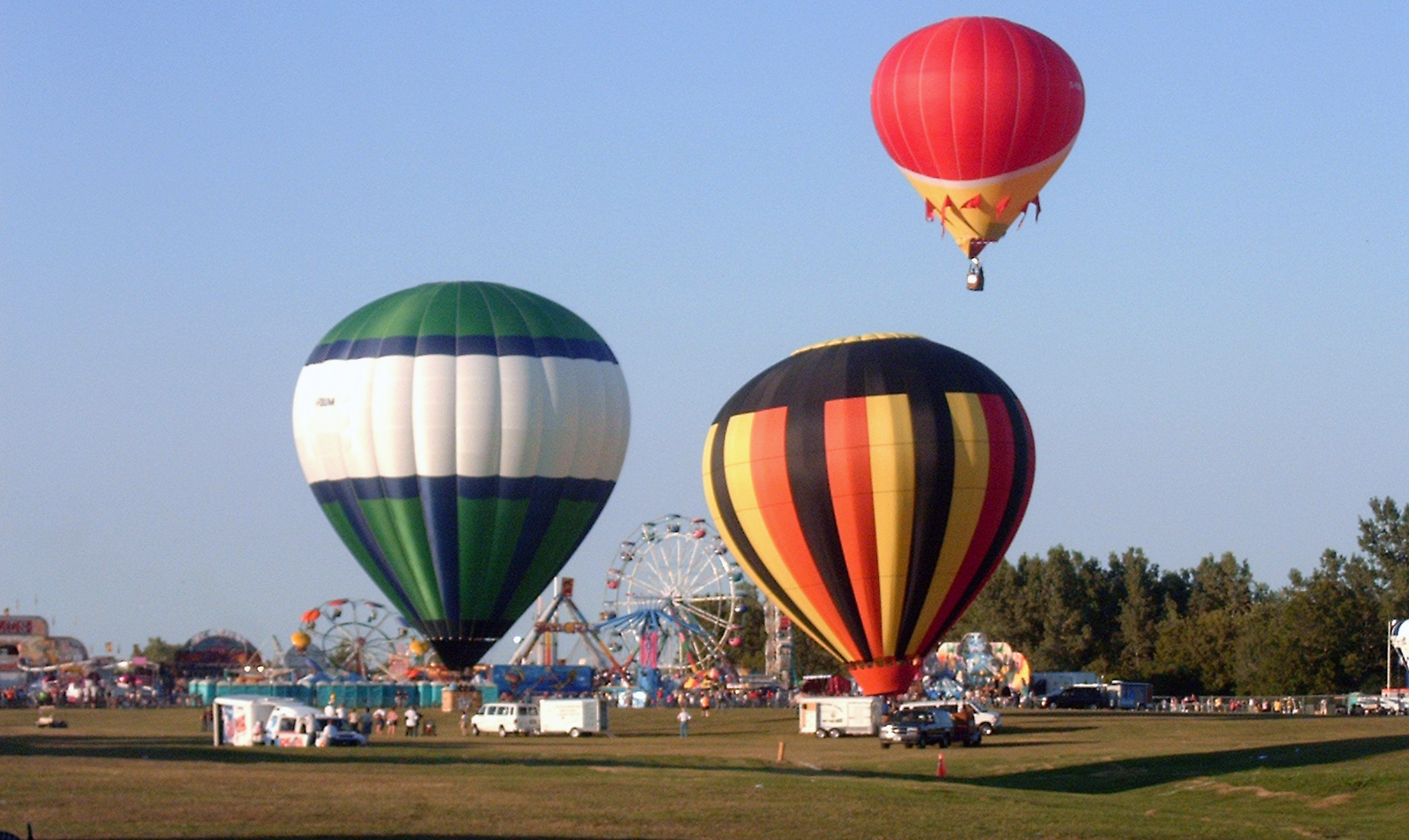
Balloon riding during the 2005 Festival

=== Jean Boileau era and the festival's beginning (1988-2001) ===
The festival started in 1988 by Jean Boileau and attracted about 50 000 visitors and about 50 balloons. Through the following years the festival became much larger and was one of the biggest festivals in Canada. Attendance at one point reached over 225,000 people and had over 150 balloons. In 1998, the festival was also hosting the World Hot Air Airship Championship, which was disputed by 16 teams from Europe, China and the United States. Shibas.

=== Fatal accident and festival departure (2001-2002) ===
On July 14, 2001, Boileau who was the general manager since its beginning was involved in a horrific hot-air balloon accident just east of the Ottawa International Airport on Leitrim Road. The balloon, while trying to land in an open field, struck some hydro wires after a sudden wind gust. It suddenly engulfed in flames. Boileau sustained multiple burns while trying to rescue his 15-year-old daughter, Julie, who was trapped inside the balloon's basket. Unfortunately, the rescue effort failed as the girl died instantly while two other people also sustained burns. Boileau, despite the fact that a subsequent Transport Canada report which mention that the accident was caused by a pilot error and bad weather conditions, was later honored by then-governor general Adrienne Clarkson for bravery. In 2007 a commemorative plaque was unveiled at the La Baie Park for Boileau's daughter known as the festival's first volunteer and a tree was also planted on site in her honor in conjunction of the festival's 20th Anniversary which also honored the founder of the festival.

After that event, he never piloted a hot-air balloon and left his general manager spot of the Festival afterwards - some speculations were that the new city of Gatineau administration of Yves Ducharme tried to force him out of the job by offering a spot for the new city as chief of communications. He was handled that position for a few months during rehabilitation, but the position was later removed and changed as the position of director of communications and the City did not appointed him for health reasons caused by his accident. Some speculated that the Ducharme administration wanted to remove people who were associated with the former city of Gatineau's last mayor, Robert Labine and Ducharme's mayoral rival in the 2001 elections for the new city of Gatineau. However, a settlement between the city and Boileau was made in 2003. The departure of Boileau had also put the Festival's future in doubt as several of his associates also left the Festival's organization.

Boileau was the communication director of the City of Gatineau from October 2013 to December 2022. Her Excellency the Right Honourable Mary Simon, Governor General of Canada, present Meritorious Service Decorations (Civil Division) to Jean Boileau in March 2024 for is implication on the développement of the Gatineau hot air balloon festival around the world.

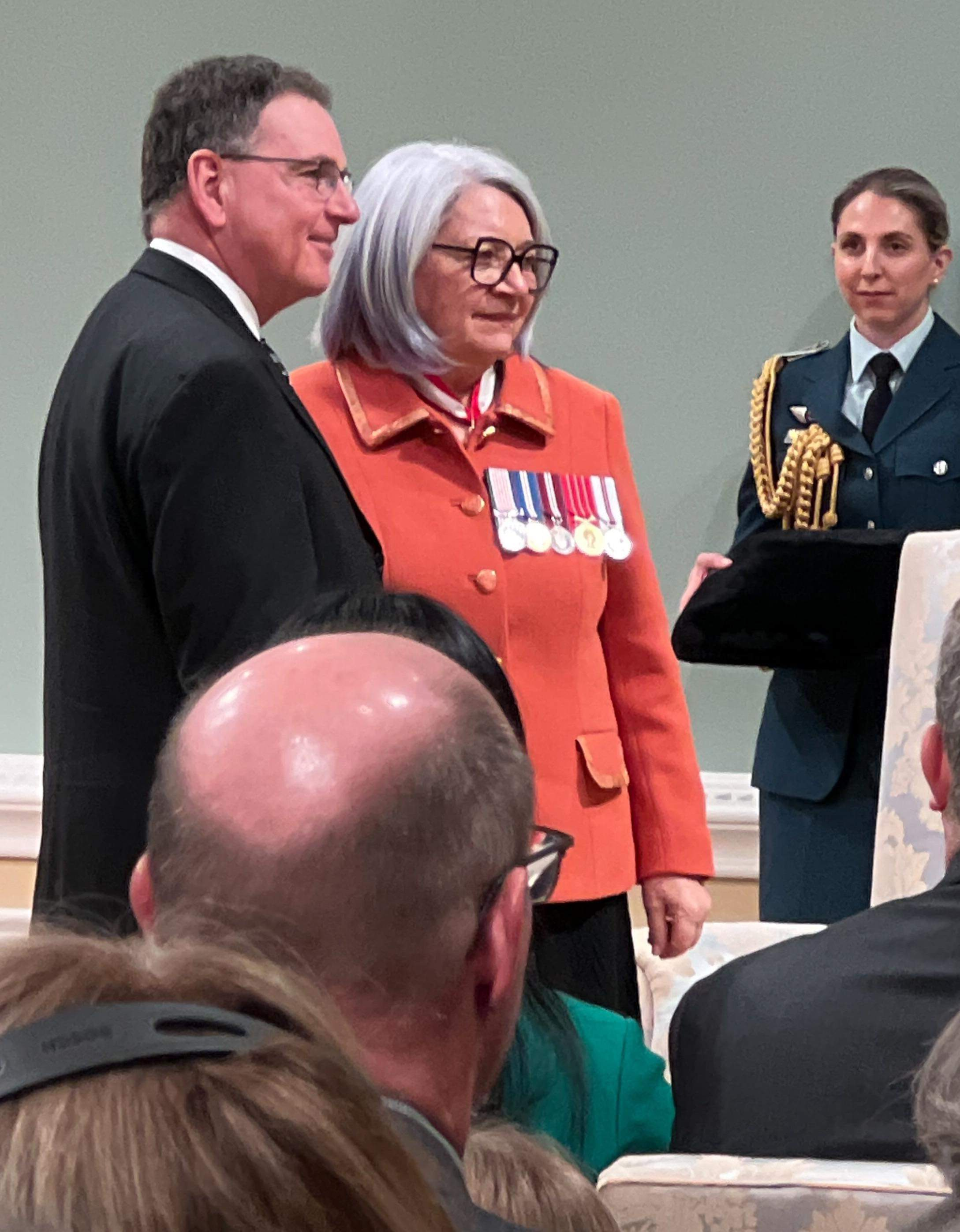
Governor General of Canada, Mary Simon present a Meritorious Service Medals (M.S.M.) to Jean Boileau during a ceremony at Rideau Hll on Thursday, March 21.

== Notable singing performers and attendance during the history of the festival ==
Several well-known artists performed during the Festival over the course of its history since 1988. Among those included:

- 1988 : 34 000 festival-goers - Show by Nuance
- 1989 : 90 000 festival-goers. Show by Céline Dion and Pierre Flynn.
- 1990 : 110 000 festival-goers. Show by Mitsou and Paul Piché.
- 1991 : 150 000 festival-goers. Show by Daniel Lavoie, André-Philippe Gagnon, Marjo and Vilain Pingouin.
- 1992 : 170 000 festival-goers. Show by Richard Séguin, Luc De Larochellière, Céline Dion and Les B.B.
- 1993 : 185 000 festival-goers. Show by Robert Charlebois, Ginette Reno, Alannah Myles and Julie Masse.
- 1994 : 200 000 festival-goers. Show by France D'Amour, Claude Dubois, Édith Butler, Gilles Vigneault and Roch Voisine.
- 1995 : 200 000 festival-goers. Show by Marjo, Sonia Benezra, Mitsou, Mario Pelchat, Jim Corcoran, Sylvain Cossette, Michaël Rancourt, Éric Lapointe and Gildor Roy.
- 1996 : 225 000 festival-goers. Show by Robert Charlebois, André-Philippe Gagnon, Marie Carmen and Kevin Parent.
- 1997 : 225 000 festival-goers. Show by Richard Séguin, Dan Bigras, Anthony Kavanagh, Gipsy Kings and Soul Attorneys.
- 1998 : 200 000 festival-goers. Show by Claude Dubois, Dubmatique, Luce Dufault, Jonny Lang, Kevin Parent and Sylvain Cossette.
- 1999 : 200 000 festival-goers. Show by Dubmatique, Bruno Pelletier, Corey Hart and Jean Leloup.
- 2000 : 200 000 festival-goers. Show by Zachary Richard, Marjo, Éric Lapointe, La Chicane, Pierre Lalonde and Richard Abel.
- 2001 : 200 000 festival-goers. Show by Luck Mervil, Sylvain Cossette, Bruno Pelletier, Okoumé, Fernand Gignac and Annie Brocoli.
- 2002 : festival-goers. Show by Alain Choquette, Gabrielle Destroismaisons, Mario Pelchat, Boom Desjardins, Richard Séguin and Stéphane Rousseau.
- 2003 : Show by Roch Voisine, Daniel Bélanger, Bob Walsh, Lulu Hugues, Yelo Molo and les Respectables.
- 2004 : 200 000 festival-goers. Show by Daniel Boucher, Nanette Workman, Marie-Chantal Toupin, Laurence Jalbert, Mélanie Renaud, Andrée Watters, Bruno Pelletier, Gino Vannelli, La Bottine Souriante and Martin Giroux.
- 2005 : Show by Boom Desjardins, Éric Lapointe, Hugo Lapointe, Martin Deschamps, Florent Vollant, Michel Pagliaro, Marie-Chantal Toupin, Luck Mervil, Vincent Vallières, Émily Bégin, Marie-Mai, Nicola Ciccone and the Boogie Wonder Band.
- 2006 : 170 000 festival-goers. Show by Simple Plan, Stéphanie Lapointe, Annie Villeneuve, Véronic DiCaire, Marjo, Garou and les Cowboys Fringants.
- 2007 : 230 000 festival-goers. Show by Dan Bigras, Bruno Pelletier, Compagnie Créole, Alfa Rococo, Eva Avila, Kaïn, Champion et ses G-Strings, Lulu Hugues, Andrée Watters, Marie-Chantal Toupin, Elizabeth Blouin-Brathwaite and Kim Richardson.
- 2008 : 190 000 festival-goers. Show by Finger Eleven, Marie-Élaine Thibert, Boom Desjardins, Jamil, France Maisonneuve, Xavier Caféïne, Dennis DeYoung, Pascale Picard and Gregory Charles.
- 2009 : 255 000 festival-goers. Show by Mes Aïeux, Kenny Rogers, Ariane Moffatt, Marie-Mai and Éric Lapointe. Spokesperson: Patrice Bélanger
- 2010 : 175 000 festival-goers – Show by Bobby Bazini, Our Lady Peace, Hedley, Laurence Jalbert, Johanne Blouin, France D'Amour, Luce Dufault, Jesse Cook, Sylvain Cossette, Bruno Pelletier, Dan Bigras and Les Cowboys Fringants.
- 2011 : Show by David Usher, Roger Hodgson, Marc Dupré, Véronic DiCaire, Annie Villeneuve, Roch Voisine, Les Trois Accords, Les Respectables.
- 2012 : 25th birthday. Show by Simple Plan, KC and the Sunshine Band, Isabelle Boulay, Éric Lapointe. Reconstruction of the first flight of hot-air balloon.
- 2013 : Show by Sean Paul, Mia Martina, Pirate Delsol, Garou, Daniel Lavoie, Valérie Carpentier, Mes Aïeux, Bernard Adamus, Loco Locass, Damien Robitaille

== See also ==
- Hot air balloon festivals
