= Véronic DiCaire =

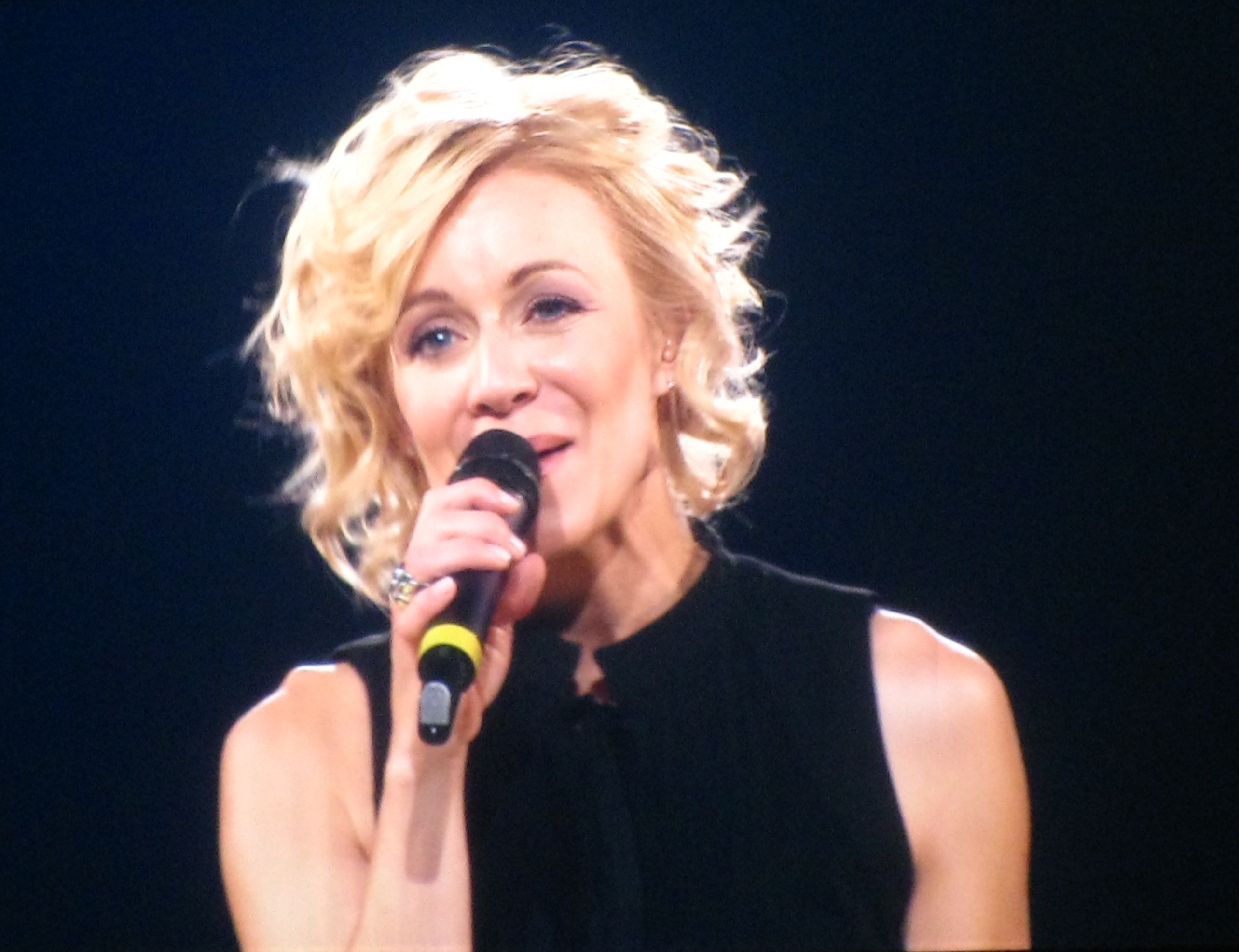
- During Taking Chances Tour

Background information
- Also known as: Véronic
- Born: 18 December 1976 (age 49)
- Origin: Embrun, Ontario, Canada
- Occupations: Impressionist, Singer
- Instrument: Vocals
- Years active: 1994–present
- Label: Warner Music Group
- Website: veronicdicaire.com

Véronic DiCaire (born in Embrun, Ontario, Canada) is a Canadian Franco-Ontarian singer and impressionist.

== Biography ==
She started her career in group Sens Unique, and then had a role in Montreal, Quebec version of the musical Grease. Her voice was used also in the French language version of Chicago, where she sang the parts pertaining to the role of Roxie Hart. In 2001, she performed at the opening ceremony of Jeux de la Francophonie, held in Ottawa. DiCaire had a role in 2006 Revue et corrigée directed by Joël Legendre. She also appeared in the television series Le 7e Round.

She released her self-titled debut album Véronic DiCaire on Warner Music. It was nominated for Felix Awards at the Gala of ADISQ. Her second album, Sans détour, followed in 2005.

In 2008, DiCaire opened for Celine Dion at Bell Centre in Montreal during Dion's Taking Chances Tour. She is also famous for her imitations of many celebrities including Celine Dion, Tina Turner, Lara Fabian, Lady Gaga, Mylène Farmer, Édith Piaf, Cher, Vanessa Paradis, Adele, Ginette Reno, Rihanna, Britney Spears, Isabelle Boulay, Whitney Houston, Marie Carmen, Gloria Estefan, Marie-Chantal Toupin, Shania Twain, Marie-Élaine Thibert, Dolly Parton, Lynda Lemay, Christina Aguilera, Marina Orsini, Claire Lamarche, Madonna, Anggun and Diane Dufresne amongst others.

In 2011, she was chosen as a jury member for the French X Factor broadcast on M6 joining other judges Christophe Willem, Henry Padovani (of the band The Police) and Olivier Schultheis.

In 2013, she took the stage at Bally's Las Vegas with her show "Voices". She returned for another six week engagement that began in May 2015.

In July 2015, during the 2015 Pan American Games opening ceremony in Toronto, the Canadian national anthem "O Canada" was performed by DiCaire and Chilly Gonzales, accompanied by the Toronto Symphony Orchestra (nearly 80 musicians). They were directed by Peter Oundjian.

In 2017, she opened for Celine Dion again, during her Celine Dion Live 2017 tour in Europe. In 2018, she opened again for Celine Dion, during her Celine Dion Live 2018 tour in Asia.

In March 2019, she devised a whole new concert spectacular that features her mimicking the voices of 50 legendary female vocalists, backed by six dancers and four musicians. The "Showgirl Tour" includes performances at various venues across Canada and Europe, and features songs by Celine Dion, Aya Nakamura, Dua Lipa and others. The production is directed by Josée Fortier, with dates lined up for 2020 as well.

In 2021 she was one of the panelists on Chanteurs masqués, the Quebec adaptation of the Masked Singer franchise. In 2022 she acted in the theatrical film Niagara, and in 2024 she appeared in Sisters and Neighbors! (Nos belles-sœurs).

== Discography ==
=== Albums ===
- 2002: Véronic DiCaire
- 2005: Sans détour
