= Pierre Brassard =

Canadian actor

Pierre Brassard (born April 24, 1966) is a French-Canadian actor, comedian, television personality, and radio broadcaster. He is associated with CKOI-FM in Montreal and known for his phone call hoaxes.

In one publicized incident, Brassard, thinly disguised as a television reporter, encountered former Canadian prime minister Pierre Elliott Trudeau at the 1993 Montreal Film Festival. After Brassard asked a series of absurd questions, Trudeau ripped off Brassard's fake beard, slapped the prankster in the face, and aimed a kick at his groin.

In 2021, he was a competitor on Chanteurs masqués, the Quebec adaptation of the Masked Singer franchise. He sang Les B.B.'s "Fais attention" in costume as a speckled trout, but was the second person eliminated from the competition.
