= Véronique Claveau =

Canadian musician

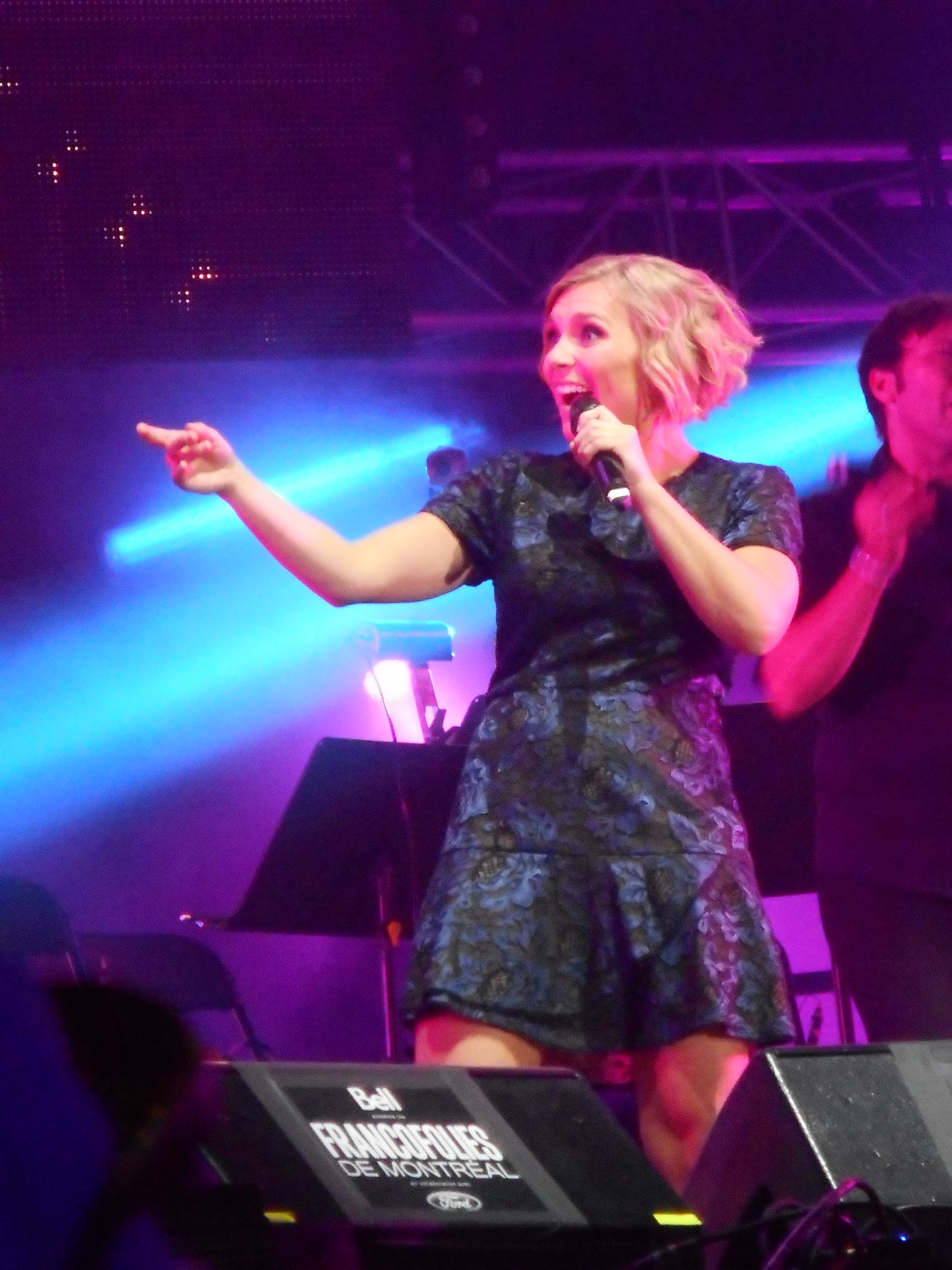
- Years active: 2004–present
- Partner: Bryan Audet

Véronique Claveau is a Canadian actress and sketch comedian from Quebec, most noted for her role as Céline Dion in the Canadian production of the stage musical Titanique.

== Career ==
A contestant in the 2004 edition of the singing competition series Star Académie, she first became more widely known as a musical comedian, appearing for several years in the annual Revue et corrigée shows at Montreal's Théâtre du Rideau Vert, where she first established her skills as a Dion impressionist. She later joined the cast of Ici Radio-Canada Télé's annual New Year's Eve Bye Bye specials in 2014. She also had a number of roles in musical theatre, including as Amber Von Tussle in a production of Hairspray and Miss Farrell in Annie.

She has also done dubbing work, including the voice of Anna in the French translations of the Frozen films.

In 2022 she competed in the second season of Chanteurs masqués, the Quebec version of the international The Masked Singer franchise, as the "Queen of the Day and the Night", winning the season.

In 2024 she debuted in Titanique, performing the role both in the show's Montreal run at the Segal Centre for Performing Arts, and its Toronto engagement at the CAA Theatre.

== Personal life ==
She is in a relationship with Bryan Audet, a singer and broadcaster who competed in a later edition of Star Académie. In 2022 the couple became cohosts of C'est plus qu'un jardin, a documentary television series about gardening, for Unis.
