= Wilfred Le Bouthillier =

Acadian pop singer (born 1978)

- Also known as: Wilfred
- Born: May 12, 1978 (age 48)
- Origin: Tracadie-Sheila, New Brunswick, Canada
- Genres: Pop, folk
- Occupation: Musician
- Instrument: Singing
- Years active: 2003–present
- Labels: Musicor; 2W Disque
- Awards: Juno Awards; 2004 Wilfred Le Bouthillier – Francophone Album of the Year
- Website: wilfredlebouthillier.com

Wilfred Le Bouthillier (born May 12, 1978) is an Acadian singer from the town of Tracadie-Sheila, New Brunswick, and the winner of both the 2003 edition of Star Académie, a French Canadian reality show for aspiring singers, and the 2021 edition of Chanteurs masqués, the French Canadian adaptation of The Masked Singer, along with Marie-Élaine Thibert.

== Life ==
He is known simply by his first name, Wilfred. His debut album Wilfred Le Bouthillier was released in the autumn of 2003. Produced with the assistance of Cajun singer Zachary Richard, it proved to be an enviable success, selling over 200,000 copies. This is exceptional for a French Canadian artist in Canada. By way of comparison, this would be equivalent to selling more than 8 million copies of an English-language album in the United States.

Among his awards and distinctions, Wilfred has received several "Prix Étoiles" (in Acadie). He took home the Juno Award for Francophone Album of the Year for his debut album, Wilfred Le Bouthillier. He was also nominated in several categories during the Quebec l'ADISQ 2005 gala, including one nomination in the Best Seller category. At the 16th SOCAN gala, his song "Je ferai tout", was listed among the top ten most-played francophone songs on the radio.

Wilfred recorded a follow-up album in 2005 called Poussières. The first song released from that album, "Avec toi", reached the top five in the radio BDS countdown while the video also placed the song in the top five on Musique Plus and Musimax (the Francophone version of MuchMusic).

At the end of August 2007, "L'insignifiant", also from the album Poussières, was sitting at number seven on Quebec's "Top 50 Radio Correspondants Francophone."

In 2021, Le Bouthillier and Thibert performed together in the first season of Chanteurs masqués, the Quebec adaptation of The Masked Singer, as a pair of lovebirds. Although not a couple in real life, their careers have been closely associated since the start, as Thibert was the runner-up on Le Bouthillier's winning season of Star Académie and they have often performed together since. They won the competition.

== Discography ==
- Je poursuis ma route (2013)
- Droit Devant (2009)
- Poussières (2006)
- L'Acadie en Chanson (2005)
- Simple – Si demain... (Turn Around) (2005)
- L'Acadie en Chanson (2004)
- Le choix du Québec (2004)
- Merci pour la chanson (2004)
- Wilfred Le Bouthillier (2003)
- Star Académie (2003)

== See also ==
- List of Quebec television series
- Television of Quebec
- Music of Quebec
- Acadia

| Preceded by None | Winner of Star Académie; 2003 | Succeeded by Stéphanie Lapointe |
