= Bibi et Geneviève =

French Canadian children's TV show

Bibi et Geneviève was a children's show made in Québec in the late 1980s through the early 1990s. It chronicled the adventures of the green-haired extraterrestrial Bibi Z99944X (a puppet) and his friend Geneviève (a live actress). The show was produced by Canal Famille.

An English version titled BB & Jennifer also aired, based on the French series, with a woman named Jennifer playing a similar role as Geneviève. Another spin-off was Bibi et Zoe, this time Bibi interacted with a teenage girl named Zoe and the other tenants of the apartment building where they lived, which included a fashion designer named Justine and a musician named Julien.
