= Steph Carse =

- Also known as: Steph Carse
- Born: Stephen Carse Dosty; May 22, 1965 (age 61)
- Origin: Montreal, Quebec, Canada
- Genres: Pop
- Occupations: Singer, actor
- Instrument: Vocals
- Years active: 1990s-present
- Website: www.stephcarse.com

Stephen Carse (born May 22, 1965), credited as Steph Carse is a Canadian pop singer.

== Career ==
Originally from Montreal, Quebec, Carse began his career in the 1990s. His first major television appearance was on TF1 in France on the show "Sacrée Soirée" with an audience of 17 million viewers. He sang an original French song called "Je voudrais lui dire", and was presented as "The Number One of Tomorrow". The song was released as a single on Sony France. His earliest hits were French translations of country hits such as "Achy Breaky Heart" and "Boot Scootin' Boogie". His breakthrough album, 1993's Steph Carse, also included songs by Elvis Presley and Roy Orbison, while his followup, 1994's Un Dernier slow, concentrated much more strongly on his own original songwriting.

He has sold over 500,000 records, earning him a Juno nomination for Best Male Artist at the Juno Awards of 1994.

In 1999, he successfully entered the mainstream Canadian market when he donated a song for the Special Olympics on an album entitled Holiday Heroes. Featuring artists like Alan Jackson, Donna Summer, Brooks & Dunn and Kevin Bacon, Carse's song led off the album, which went gold and raised over $2 millions of net profit for the Canadian Special Olympics.

Carse released his first American album, Reach Out, in 2006. Reach Out was also promoted by a 60-minute concert special which aired internationally, including on PBS in the United States.

The one-hour special Reach Out was filmed in Kauai, Las Vegas, the Bahamas and Orlando, Florida, and has won five awards from The Florida Motion Picture and Television Association FMPTA: "Best Feature Film in a Television Program", "Best Male Vocalist in a Feature Film", "Best Director in a Music Video", "Best Male Vocalist in a Music Video" and "Best Composer for the song Reach Out". Carse's collaborators on the Reach Out project were Eric Schilling, Joe Hogue and Gilles Godard.

Carse donated the self-penned title track, "Reach Out" to the American Red Cross in September, just three days before the Hurricane Katrina disaster. The Red Cross fell in love with the song, named it the Official Thank You Song of the American Red Cross and used it to thank volunteers and donors.

The album The Best Pop Opera 2010, which features Carse's original song "No More Masquerade", reached #1 in Turkey in March 2010, and remained in the Top 5 for over eight months.

In 2012, Carse donated a song to Whole Foods for The Whole Planet Foundation to help fight poverty around the world.

In 2013, Carse acted for the first time in the romantic comedy film Marriage Material with Maddy Curley.

On August 12, 2017, Carse's one-hour television special My Shining Hour aired on Daystar.

In 2019 Steph Carse won the Emmy Award for Musical/Composition/Arrangement for "Amazing Grace" from the National Academy of Television Arts and Sciences, Suncoast Chapter.

The National Academy of Television Arts and Sciences announced the winners of the 2020 Suncoast Regional Emmy Awards. Steph Carse received 2 Emmy Awards in the category Director for "Y iCount (You Are Awesome)," and Producer in a Religious Program: "My Shining Hour Story".

== Discography ==
- J'ai envie de t'aimer (1991)
- Stef Carse (1993)
- Un Dernier slow (1994)
- Fiesta
- Holiday Heroes
- Reach Out (2006)
- The Best Pop Opera (2010)
- Now (2012)
- My Shining Hour (2017)
- Steph Carse 25 (2019)
