= Alain Choquette =

Quebec illusionist

- Born: 1961 (age 64–65); Quebec, Canada
- Occupations: Illusionist, television host

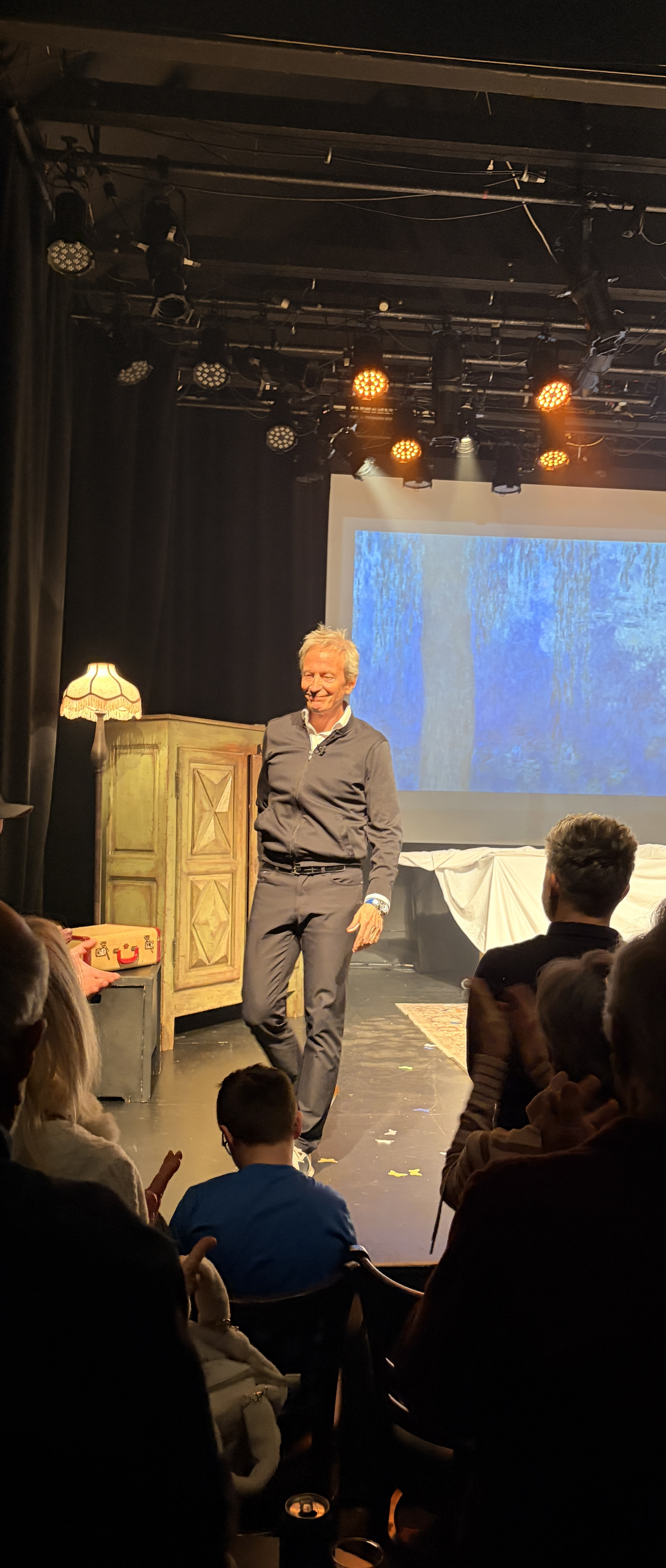
Taken 29 March 2026

Alain Choquette (born 1961) is a Québécois illusionist.

== Biography ==
Choquette is considered one of the first Quebec magicians to have presented large-scale solo illusion shows.

In 1993, at the age of 31, he presented the show Première apparition at the Université de Sherbrooke Cultural Centre, marking an important milestone in his career. It was one of the first magic shows conceived to be carried by a single Québécois illusionist on stage. Subsequent performances were planned at the Théâtre Saint-Denis, along with a provincial tour spanning approximately two years.

From 1993 onward, he multiplied his performances across Quebec and the United States.

For seven years, he performed his close-up magic on the talk show Ad Lib.

One of his tricks, La Disparition des douze, was taken up by the renowned David Copperfield, and he has also collaborated with Arturo Brachetti and Roman Polanski. As a speaker, he also hosted the programme Passion Maisons on the Historia channel in Quebec.

Choquette has stated that some of his routines were reproduced without authorization, including a card trick created in 1996 and later performed by David Blaine in his Las Vegas show. He has noted that this type of situation is common in the world of magic, where the legal protection of creative works remains limited and relies primarily on professional ethics.

In 2025, he celebrated 35 years of performing with the show Entre histoires et illusions. Over the course of his career, he has performed in Las Vegas, where he was among the first Québécois artists to have a residency show. In Europe, he achieved considerable success in France with more than 650 performances of Drôlement magique between 2014 and 2018 at the Théâtre de la Gaîté in Montparnasse, Paris.

== See also ==
- Dai Vernon
- David Copperfield (illusionist)
- Culture of Quebec
