= Joe Bocan =

Canadian singer & actress (born 1957)

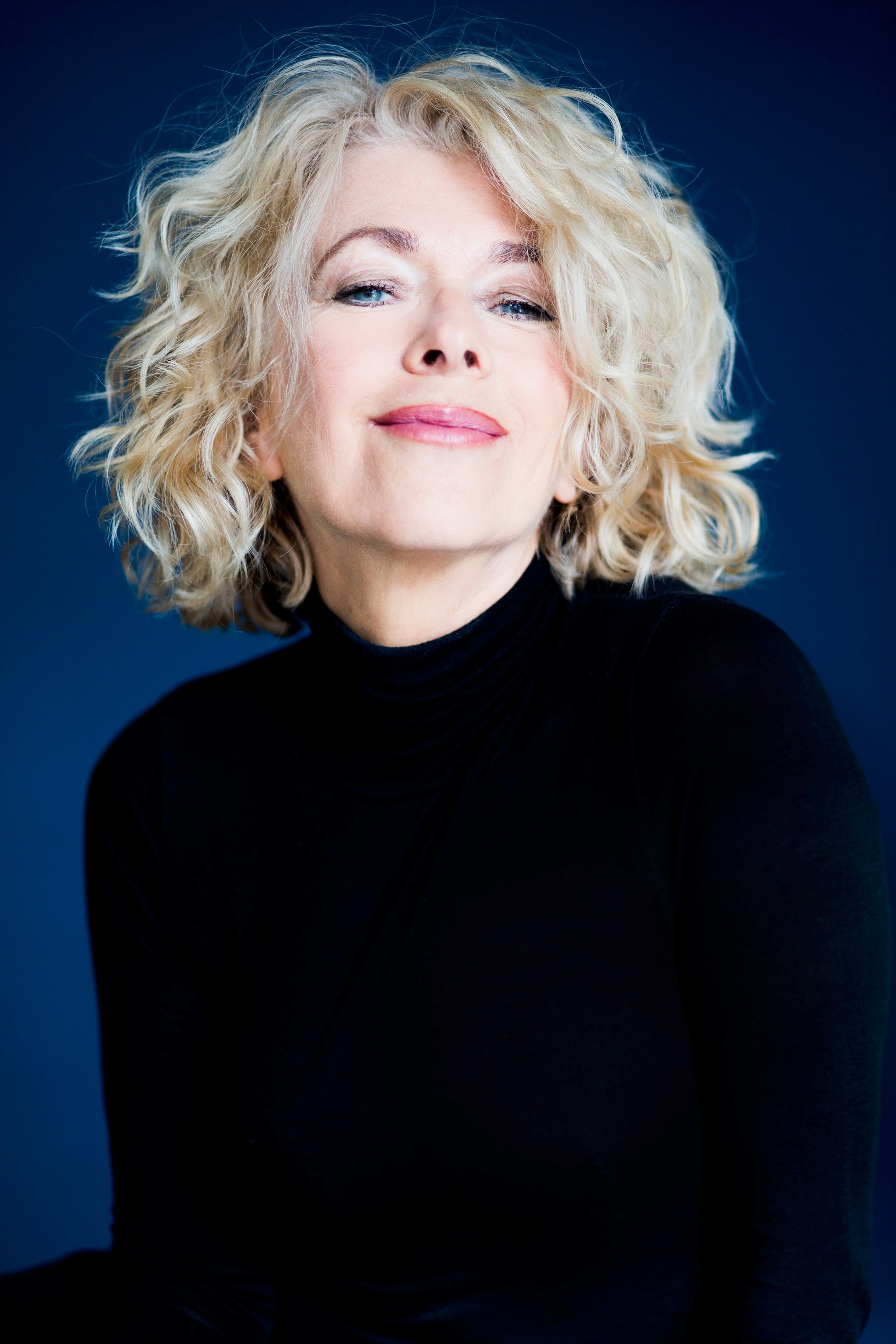

Background information
- Born: Johanne Beauchamp; 1957 (age 68–69)
- Genre: pop music
- Occupations: singer, actress, radio host
- Years active: 1980s–present

Joe Bocan is the stage name of Johanne Beauchamp (born September 8, 1957), a Canadian pop singer and actress from Quebec. She is best known for her 1989 single "Repartir à zéro" (Translation: "Starting from Scratch").

== Background ==
Beginning her career in theatre, she later began performing as a folk singer and won an award from the Festival international de la chanson de Granby in 1983.

By 1985, she was performing a regular show, Paradoxale, at Le Milieu in Montreal. The show incorporated some of the multimedia performance techniques then being used by contemporaneous artists such as Peter Gabriel, Kate Bush, Laurie Anderson and Jane Siberry. In 1986, she was given her first television special on Télévision de Radio-Canada, and was one of the performers at Canada's first major benefit concert for HIV/AIDS alongside Michel Louvain, Peter Pringle, Denny Christianson and Les Grands Ballets Canadiens. During this era, she also had a regular acting role on the Quebec children's television series Minibus. She won a Félix Award for Best Pop Show in 1986 for Paradoxale.

Bocan also played the role of Carmen Sandiego in the French-Canadian version of American game show Where in Time Is Carmen Sandiego? titled À la poursuite de Carmen Sandiego which aired on Radio-Canada and lasted from 1998-1999 (with reruns extending until 2001).

== Recording career ==
Her self-titled debut album was released in 1988, and spawned singles including "Paradoxale", "On parle des yeux" and "Repartir à zéro". She led the 1989 Félix nominations with 10 nods, but won only the award for best pop-rock show that year. The following year, she won the Félix for Best Female Singer.

She followed up with Les Désordres in 1991, and had another hit single with "Apocalypso". In this era, she continued to take acting roles in television series such as Piège infernal and La Misère des riches. While filming La Misère des riches, she met musician and actor Charles Biddle, Jr., the son of legendary Canadian jazz musician Charlie Biddle; they soon became a couple and later married.

She released two further albums and a greatest hits compilation in the 1990s, and the children's album La Comtesse d'Harmonia fait le tour du monde in 2001. Her further acting roles included the films Meurtre en musique and The Ideal Man (L'Homme idéal), and the children's television series Ramdam.

Following La Comtesse d'Harmonia, she left the music business for several years, teaching theatre at the École des Arts de la Scène in Joliette. She returned to music in the 2010s with a second children's album, La Comtesse d'Harmonia - Pour faire danser la terre, in 2011 and a new adult pop album, La loupe, in 2013.

A longtime ally of the LGBT community in Quebec, she debuted in 2015 as a radio host on Montreal's new LGBT-focused radio station CHRF. She was cohost with Miguel Doucet of Les Pétards, a daily arts and culture magazine show until the station discontinued its LGBT format in December.

In 2020, Bocan, Marie Carmen and Marie Denise Pelletier announced the joint concert tour Pour une histoire d'un soir, although the tour was delayed by the COVID-19 pandemic in Quebec and instead launched in 2022. The tour won the Félix Award for Variety or Reinterpretation Concert of the Year at the 44th Félix Awards.

== Film ==
In 1987 she appeared and sang in a semi-documentary movie about World War I titled La guerre oubliée, directed by Richard Boutet.

== Discography ==
- Joe Bocan (1988)
- Les désordres (1991)
- Le baiser (1994)
- Regards (1997)
- La Comtesse d'Harmonia fait le tour du monde (2001)
- La Comtesse d'Harmonia - Pour faire danser la terre (2011)
- La loupe (2013)
