= Marie-Élaine Thibert =

Canadian singer (born 1982)

Marie-Elaine Thibert
- Born: April 18, 1982 (age 44)
- Origin: Montreal, Quebec, Canada
- Genres: Light rock, Adult contemporary, Pop
- Years active: 2003-present
- Label: Musicor

Marie-Élaine Thibert (born April 18, 1982) is a Canadian adult contemporary and pop singer based in Quebec. Thibert was first notable for being the runner-up in the first season of Star Académie in 2003, the Quebec singing idol reality show. She is also a two-time Felix-award winner for Best Female Artist in Quebec and one-time Juno-award winner for Best Francophone album in Canada.

== Background ==
Self-titled Debut album from Marie-Elaine Thibert released in 2004

=== Early life ===
Born in the district of LaSalle in the Montréal region, Thibert started to express interest in music during high school and college. She participated in several competitions and contests some of which she won. Thibert then auditioned for Star Académie in 2003 in which she performed on several occasions one of her favorites songs performed originally by Jacques Brel. Thibert finished second to Acadien-born Wilfred Le Bouthillier in the show's first season.

After Star Académie, Thibert met up several times with her long-time Idol Celine Dion and once met a duet performance prior to her disc launch.

=== Music career ===
Her self-titled debut album was launched a few months after Star Académie in early 2004. 300,000 copies of the album were sold, which easily surpassed the totals of Le Bouthiller's self-titled album and season-two champion Stéphanie Lapointe's Sur le fil, the latter of which is in a genre similar to Thibert but with a much lighter tone. The success of the album resulted in two Felix award at the ADISQ gala later that year. She won the awards for the album with the best sales and best female singer. She won the latter category again in 2005. She also won a Juno Award for best Francophone Album in Canada for her debut album, ahead of Dany Bédard, Nicola Ciccone, Canadian Idol finalist Audrey De Montigny and Les Trois Accords. She was also nominated for Juno Fan Choice Award in which Avril Lavigne won ahead of Thibert, Sarah McLachlan, Diana Krall and Shania Twain.

Album cover of Thibert's second release: Comme ça (2007)

In 2007, Thibert released her second album Comme ça and as of August 2007, over 100 000 copies were sold. The album was made with the help of collaborators such as Chris de Burgh, Luc de Larochellière, Michel Rivard and Paul Piché as well as musical contributions from Marc Dupré, Marc Déry and Daniel Lavoie.

In addition, Thibert has released a DVD from a live performance at Montreal's Bell Centre during her Quebec-wide tour in 2005–2006. The show aired on TV network TVA which was the main network of all three Star Académie seasons from 2003 to 2006. In 2007–2008, she made a second province-wide tour in which most shows were sold out very quickly. Her albums include Marie-Élaine Thibert (self-titled debut album released in 2004), Comme Ça (released: April 17, 2007) and Un Jour Noël (released: October 14, 2008).

In March 2019, she was one of 11 singers from Quebec, alongside Ginette Reno, Diane Dufresne, Céline Dion, Isabelle Boulay, Luce Dufault, Louise Forestier, Laurence Jalbert, Catherine Major, Ariane Moffatt and Marie Denise Pelletier, who participated in a supergroup recording of Renée Claude's 1971 single "Tu trouveras la paix" after Claude's diagnosis with Alzheimer's disease was announced.

In 2021, Thibert and Le Bouthillier performed together in the first season of Chanteurs masqués, the Quebec adaptation of The Masked Singer, as a pair of lovebirds. Although not a couple in real life, they have often collaborated since their shared season of Star Académie. They won the competition.

== Discography ==
=== Studio albums ===
Year	Information	Peak	Certifications
Year	Information	CAN	Certifications
2004	Marie-Elaine Thibert: First studio album; Released: May 17, 2004; Label: Musicor/Distribution Select; Format: CD, digital download	1	CAN: 3× Platinum
2007	Comme Ça: Second studio album; Released: April 17, 2007; Label: Musicor/Distribution Select; Format: CD, digital download	1	CAN: Platinum
2008	Un Jour Noël: Third studio album; Released: October 14, 2008; Label: Musicor/Distribution Select; Format: CD, digital download	6	CAN: Platinum
2011	Je suis: Fourth studio album; Released: May 3, 2011; Label: Musicor; Format: CD, digital download	5	
2013	Cent mille chansons: Fifth studio album; Released: October 29, 2013; Label: Musicor; Format: CD, digital download	—	
2015	Mes berceuses: Seventh studio album; Released: March 18, 2015; Label: Production Methibert; Format: CD, digital download	—	
2017	Un hymne à l'amour: Seventh studio album; Released: September 22, 2013; Label: Bobten; Format: CD, digital download	67	
2022	Notre Histoire: eighth studio album; Released: 2022; GSI Musuque; Format: CD, digital download	67	

== Filmography ==
- Marie-Elaine en spectacle (2006) - DVD
