= Stéphane Rousseau =

Canadian actor, comedian (born 1966)

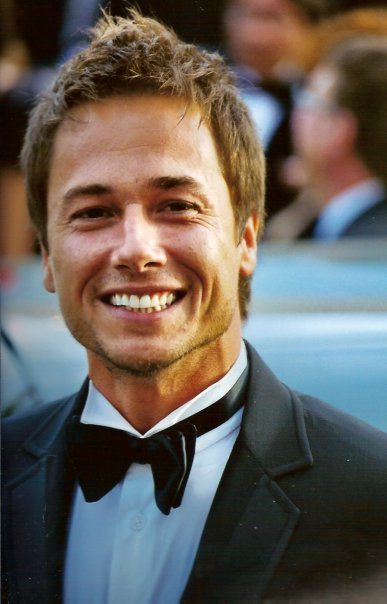
- Rousseau at the 2003 Cannes Film Festival
- Born: September 17, 1966 (age 59); LaSalle, Quebec, Canada
- Occupations: Actor, comedian
- Years active: 1998–present
- Spouse(s): Julie Perreault (m. 2026)
- Children: 1

Stéphane Rousseau (French pronunciation: [stefan ʁuso]; born September 17, 1966) is a Canadian actor and comedian. He starred in the Academy Award-winning film The Barbarian Invasions. He has also been in Asterix at the Olympic Games (2008). In 2010, he appeared in the French comedy film Fatal, a Zoolander-type spoof of the music industry focusing on the character Fatal Bazooka created by Michaël Youn.

In 2021 he was one of the panellists on Chanteurs masqués, the Quebec adaptation of the Masked Singer franchise.

== Personal life ==
He and former partner Maud Saint-Germain share a son, Axel Saint-Germain-Rousseau, born on December 25, 2008.

== Filmography ==
Year	Film	Role	Notes
1998	La petite vie	Scott	TV series
2002	Les dangereux	Francis Jobin	
2003	The Barbarian Invasions	Sébastien	Genie Award for Best Performance by an Actor in a Supporting Role
2005	The Locrian Mode	Francisco Foote	
2006–2007	Le cœur a ses raisons	Bo Bellingsworth	TV series
2008	Asterix at the Olympic Games	Lovesix	
2008	Modern Love	Vincent	
2010	Fatal	Chris Prolls	
2012	Omertà	Sam Cohen	
2013	Paris à tout prix	Nicolas	
2021	Sam	Marc	
2021	Chanteurs masqués	Judge	TV series
2022	Two Days Before Christmas	Antoine	
