= Allan Théo =

- Born: Allan Rouget; 11 April 1972 (age 54)
- Origin: Saint-Amand-Montrond, France
- Genres: Pop-Rock
- Occupation: Singer
- Years active: 1998–present
- Website: www.allantheo.fr/

Allan Théo (born Allan Rouget; 11 April 1972, Saint-Amand-Montrond) is a French singer, particularly well known for his 1998 single "Emmène-moi", which peaked at No. 6.

== Discography ==
=== Albums ===
Year	Album	Peak positions	
Year	Album	FR	BEL (Wa)
1998	Emmène-moi	40	19
2002	Soupir	–	–
2006	J'ai pas demandé	–	–
2007	Théo	–	–
2006	Reprends les armes	–	–

=== Singles ===
Year	Single	Peak positions			Album
Year	Single	FR	BEL (Fl)	BEL (Wa)	Album
1998	"Emmène-moi"	6	13 (Ultratop)	2	Emmène-moi
1998	"Lola"	8	11 (Ultratip)	4	Emmène-moi
1998	"J'aurai voulu te dire"	51	–	4	Emmène-moi
1999	"Soñar"	36	–	33	Emmène-moi

- 2006 : "J'ai pas demandé"
- 2011 : "Je dérive"
- 2011 : "Vivre au soleil"
