= Francine Raymond =

Francine Raymond (born 9 June 1956 in Montreal, Quebec) is a Francophone Canadian folk-style singer songwriter. In 1994, Raymond's music was distributed by Montreal-based Distribution Select.

In 2021, Raymond and her guitarist and songwriting partner Christian Péloquin were inducted into the Canadian Songwriters Hall of Fame.

== Albums ==
- Francine Raymond (1987)
- Souvenirs retrouvés (1989)
- Les années lumières (1993)
- Dualité (1996)
- Paradis perdu (2002)
