= Johanne Blouin =

Canadian singer-songwriter

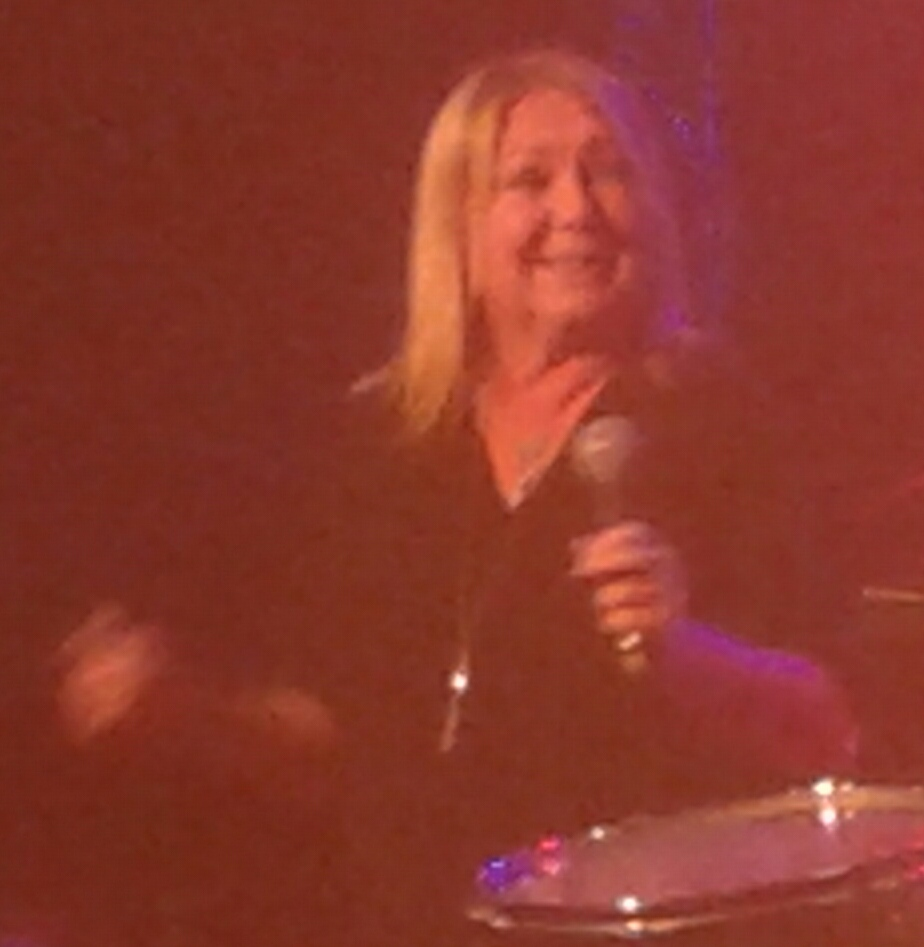

Background information
- Born: September 19, 1955 (age 70); Saint-Hyacinthe, Quebec, Canada
- Occupation: Singer-songwriter

Johanne Blouin (born September 19, 1955), is a Canadian singer-songwriter. She won the Félix Award twice for her albums Merci Félix (1988) and Johanne Blouin (1989).

Blouin was born in Saint-Hyacinthe, Quebec, Canada.

== Discography ==
- Merci Felix (Les Productions Guy Cloutier, 1988)
- Johanne Blouin (Les Productions Guy Cloutier, 1989)
- Sainte Nuit (Les Productions Guy Cloutier, 1990)
- Entre L'Amour Et La Guerre (Les Productions Guy Cloutier, 1992)
- Souviens-Moi (L'Etoile Du Nord, 1993)
- Noels D'espoir with Michel Legrand (L'Etoile Du Nord, 1994)
- Chante Noel (Du Nord, 1994)
- Elle Le Dira (L'Etoile Du Nord, 1995)
- Que Veux-tu Que J'te Dise (L'Etoile Du Nord, 1998)
- Everything Must Change (Justin Time, 2000)
- Until I Met You with Vic Vogel (Justin Time, 2004)
- Rose Drummond (2005)
- Lui (Musicor, 2010)
- French Kiss (Pyramide Bleue, 2014)
