= Diane Dufresne =

French Canadian singer and painter

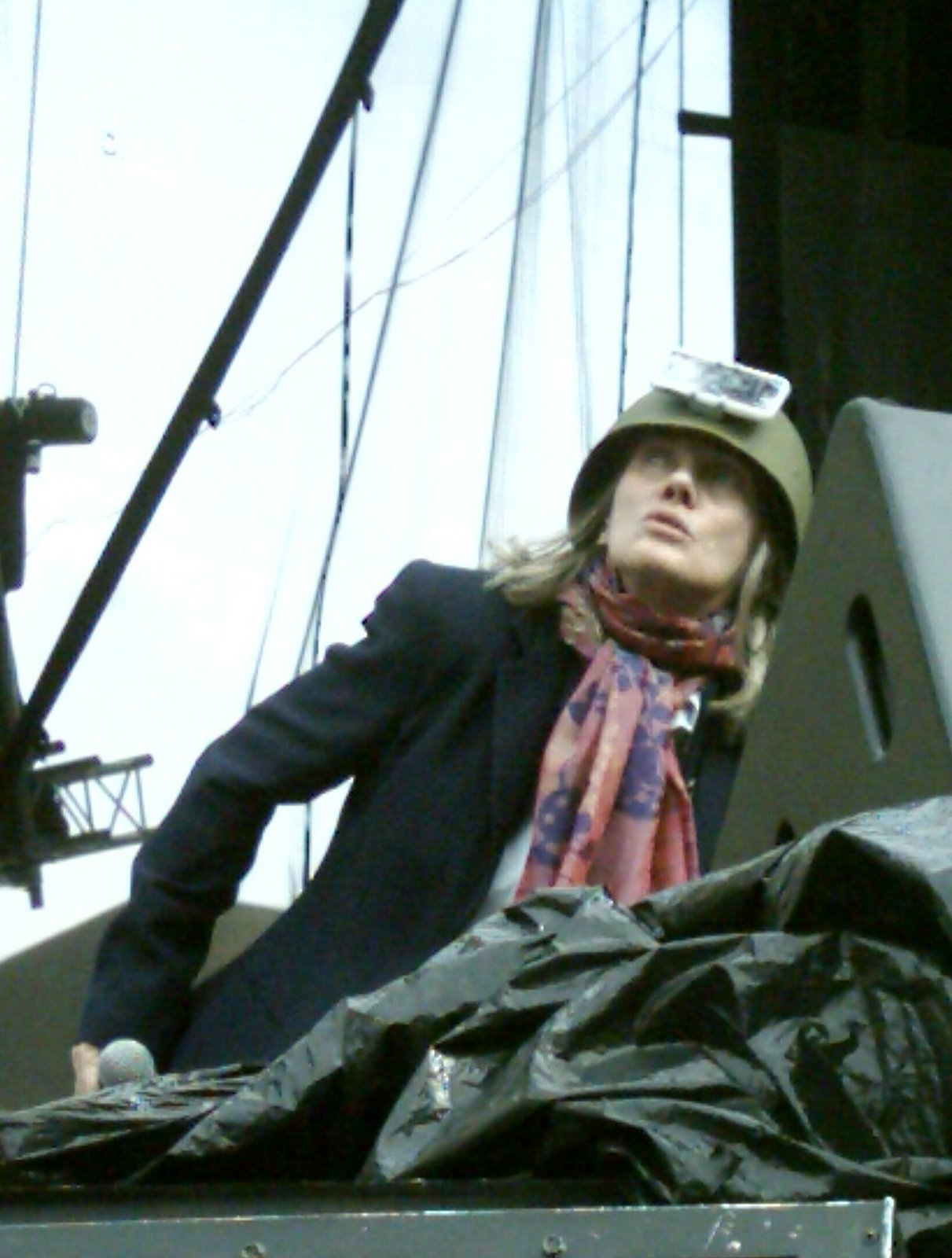
- Dufresne performing 3 August 2008 at Les FrancoFolies de Montréal.

Background information
- Born: 30 September 1944 (age 81); Montreal, Quebec, Canada
- Occupations: Singer; Painter
- Years active: 1969–present
- Website: www.dianedufresne.com

Diane Dufresne, CM CQ (French pronunciation: [djan dyfʁɛn]; born 30 September 1944) is a French Canadian singer and painter, and is known for singing a large repertoire of popular Quebec songs.

Dufresne was born in Montreal, Quebec, Canada. She lived in Paris from 1965 to 1967 where she studied voice with Jean Lumière and dramatic art with Françoise Rosay. While there, she performed in noted boîtes à chansons such as l'Écluse, l'Échelle de Jacob, and le Caveau de la Bolée.

On her return to Montreal, she began a collaboration with composer François Cousineau, and lyricist Luc Plamondon.

In March 2019, she was one of 11 singers from Quebec, alongside Ginette Reno, Céline Dion, Isabelle Boulay, Luce Dufault, Louise Forestier, Laurence Jalbert, Catherine Major, Ariane Moffatt, Marie Denise Pelletier and Marie-Élaine Thibert, who participated in a supergroup recording of Renée Claude's 1971 single "Tu trouveras la paix" after Claude's diagnosis with Alzheimer's disease was announced.

In 2023, she was inducted into the Canadian Music Hall of Fame.

== Awards and recognition ==
- 1987 – Félix Award, best pop show: Top Secret
- 2001 – Governor General's Performing Arts Award, Canada's highest honour in the performing arts
- 2002 – Made a knight of the National Order of Quebec
- 2006 – Félix Hommage for her lifetime achievements
- 2008 – Legion of Honour by France
- 2015 – Appointed as a Member of the Order of Canada
- 2023 – Inducted into the Canadian Music Hall of Fame

== Discography ==
- 1969 – L'initiation
- 1972 – Tiens-toé ben, j'arrive
- 1973 – À part de d'ça, j'me sens ben
- 1974 – 12 succès pop
- 1975 – Sur la même longueur d'ondes
- 1975 – Mon premier show (en public)
- 1977 – Maman, si tu m'voyais... tu s'rais fière de ta fille!
- 1978 – Olympia '78, volume 1 et 2
- 1978 – Starmania
- 1979 – Starmania, le spectacle
- 1979 – Striptease
- 1982 – Turbulences
- 1984 – Dioxine de carbone et son rayon rose
- 1984 – Magie rose (en public)
- 1985 – Chanteurs sans frontières (special participation)
- 1986 – Follement vôtre
- 1987 – Top secret
- 1988 – Master série en 2 volumes (compilation album)
- 1991 – Sans dessous dessus (compilation album)
- 1993 – Détournement majeur
- 1997 – Diane Dufresne
- 2000 – Merci (compilation album: Quebec)
- 2002 – Merci (compilation album: France)
- 2005 – Diane Dufresne chante Kurt Weill, with Yannick Nézet-Séguin
- 2007 – Effusions, accompanied by Alain Lefèvre
- 2018 – Meilleur Après

== Shows ==
- 1987 – Top Secret
- 2002 – En liberté conditionnelle
- 2004 – Symphonie de Kurt Weill (single concert)
- 2006 – Plurielle en Quatre Tableaux

== See also ==
- List of Quebec musicians
- Music of Quebec
- Culture of Quebec
