= Gabrielle Destroismaisons =

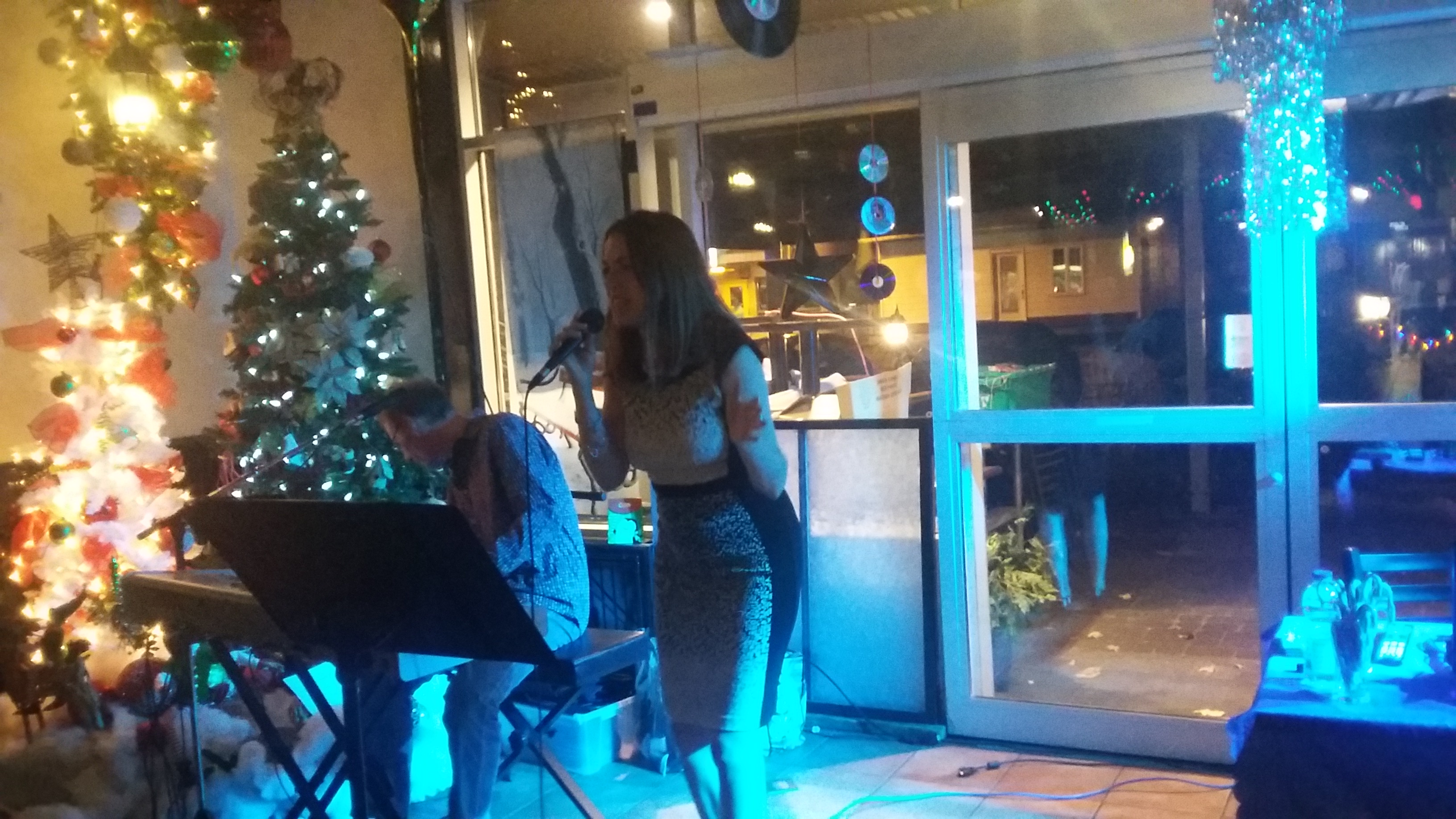

Background information
- Born: December 29, 1982 (age 43)
- Origin: Montreal, Quebec, Canada
- Genres: Pop, Dance, Techno
- Years active: 2000–present
- Labels: Nora Myle

Gabrielle Destroismaisons (born December 29, 1982, in Saint-Lin-Laurentides, Quebec) is a Québécois singer. In 2000, she released her debut album Etc..., which sold more than 100,000 copies in a few months and led to Destroismaisons being awarded one win and two nominations at the 2002 Félix Awards and a nomination at the 2002 Juno Awards. She participated in the 20 year anniversary show of "La fureur" as a guest singer.

== Discography ==
- 2000: Etc...
- 2003: La vie qui danse
- 2004: Gabrielle Destroismaisons

== Videography ==
- "Et cetera"
- "Into You"
- "Le big bang"
- "Suivre l'étoile"
- "Laisse-moi"
- "Folle folie" (2004)
- "Elle attend"

== Awards and nominations ==
=== Prix Félix (Félix Awards) ===
2001

- Won Révélation de l'année (New Artist of the Year)
- Nominated for Album de l'année, pop/rock (Album of the Year, Pop/Rock) for Etc...
- Nominated for Interprète féminine de l'année (Female Performer of the Year)

2003

- Nominated for Album de l'année, pop/rock (Album of the Year, Pop/Rock) for La vie qui danse

=== Juno Awards ===
2002

- Nominated for Best New Solo Artist
- Nominated for Best Selling Francophone Album for Etc...
