= Luce Dufault =

Canadian singer

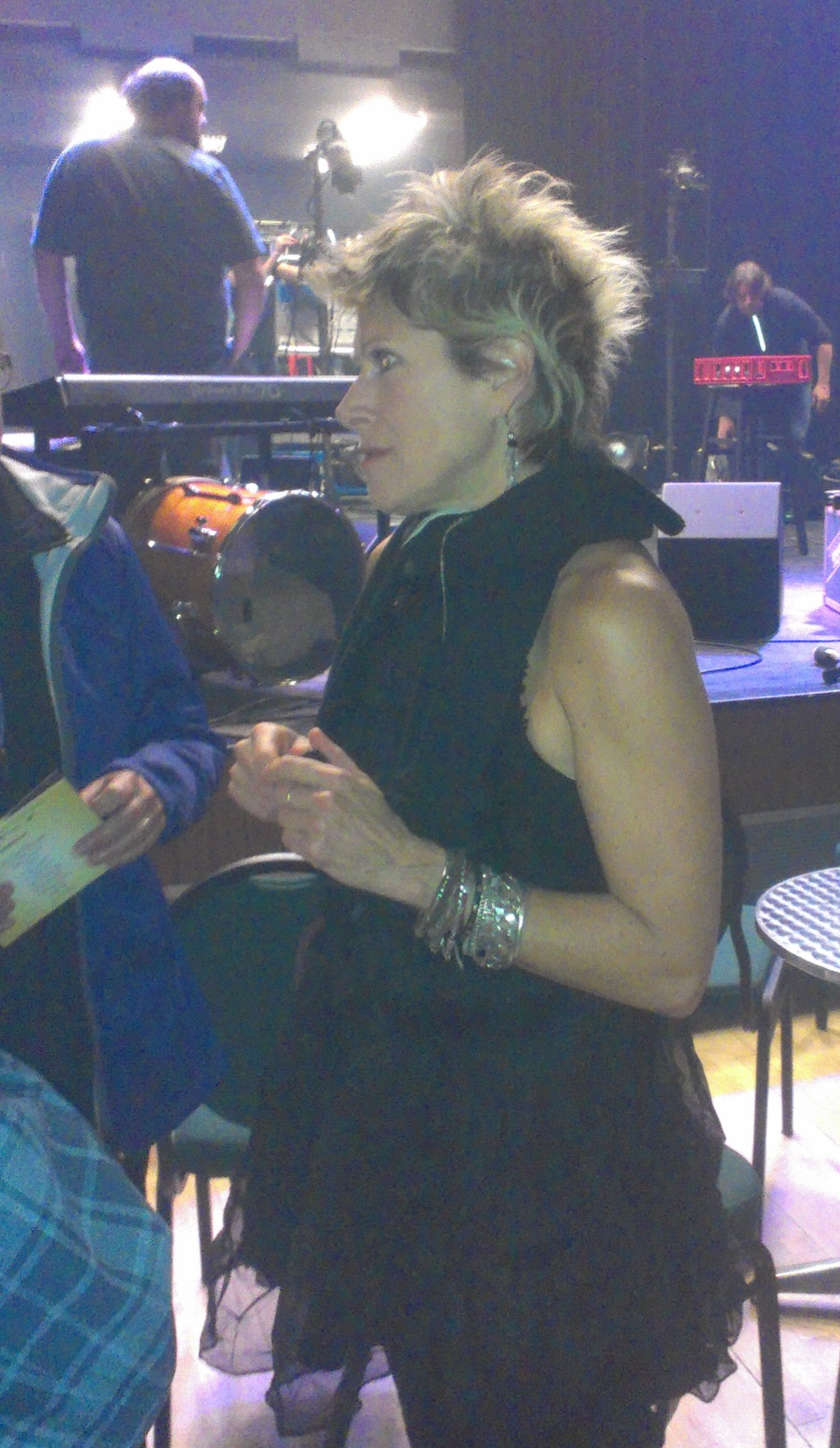
- at La Petite Église following her concert.
- Born: August 19, 1966 (age 59); Orleans, Ontario, Canada
- Occupation: Singer

Luce Dufault (born August 19, 1966, in Orleans, Ontario) is a Canadian singer. She is of French descent. She performed in two musicals from Luc Plamondon, La Légende de Jimmy and Starmania. She recorded a few hits including Soirs de scotch, Au delà des mots and Ce qu'il reste de nous.

In March 2019, she was one of 11 singers from Quebec, alongside Ginette Reno, Diane Dufresne, Céline Dion, Isabelle Boulay, Louise Forestier, Laurence Jalbert, Catherine Major, Ariane Moffatt, Marie Denise Pelletier and Marie-Élaine Thibert, who participated in a supergroup recording of Renée Claude's 1971 single "Tu trouveras la paix" after Claude's diagnosis with Alzheimer's disease was announced.

In 2025, Dufault took part in a remake of Les Belles-soeurs, a play written by Michel Tremblay. In the play, Dufault is cast as Pierette Guérin.

== Discography ==
- 1996 – Luce Dufault
- 1998 – Des milliards de choses
- 2000 – Soir de première
- 2001 – Au-delà des mots
- 2004 – Bleu
- 2007 – Demi-jour
- 2010 – Luce
- 2013 – Du temps pour moi
- 2020 – Dire combien je t'aime No. 44 Canadian Albums Chart

== Family ==
Dufault is related to artist and writer Ernest Dufault, better known by the alias Will James. She is also related to journalist and sports commentator Pierre Dufault.
