= Les B.B. =

Canadian music band

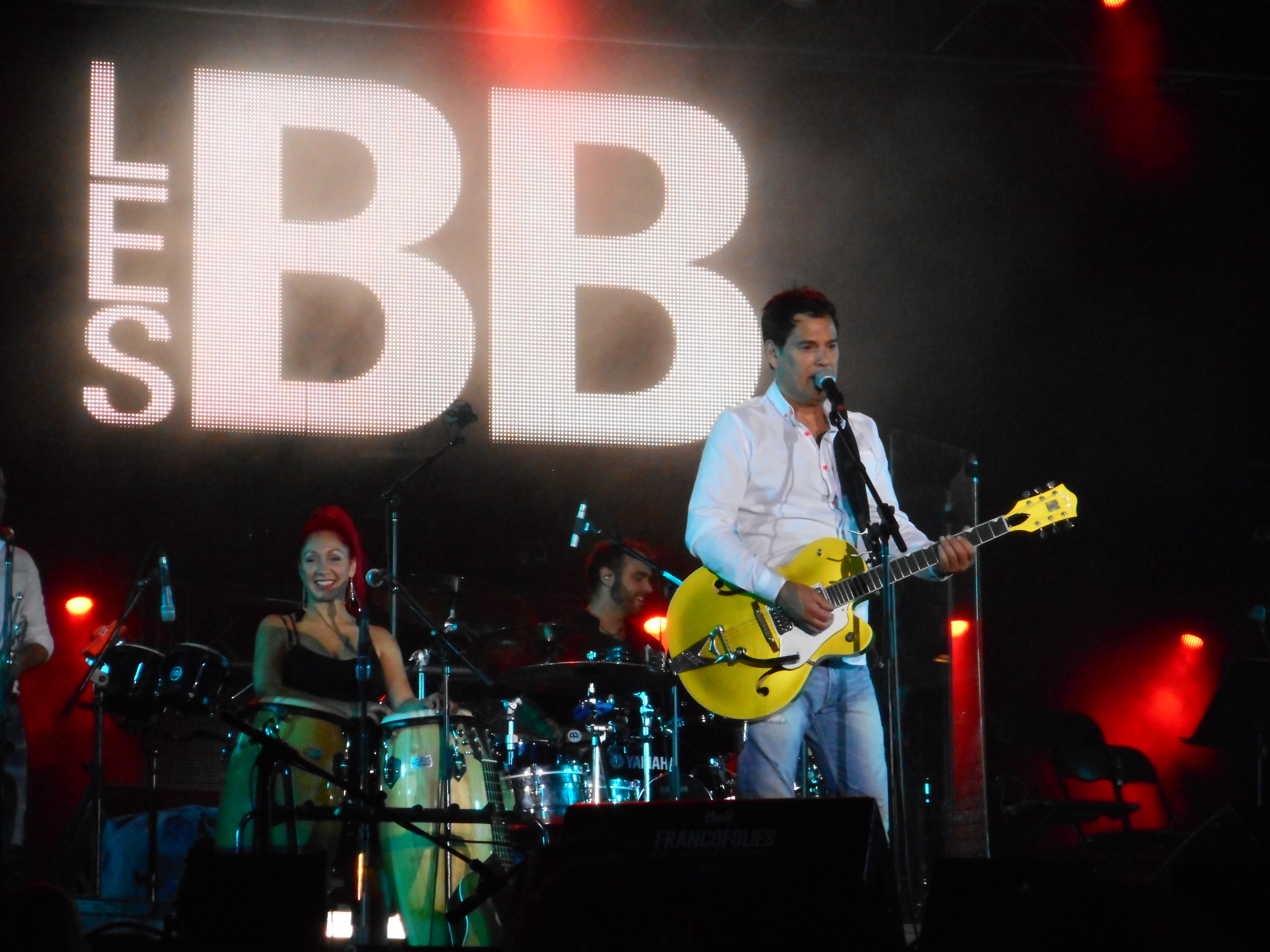
- Patrick Bourgeois in 2015

Background information
- Origin: Quebec, Canada
- Years active: 1989–2017
- Past members: Patrick Bourgeois (deceased); Alain Lapointe; François Jean (deceased)

Les B.B. (pronounced leh beh beh) was a Canadian band from the province of Quebec. It had great success in the 1980s and the early 1990s. It is made up of Patrick Bourgeois (vocals, guitar, bass), Alain Lapointe (keyboards, guitar, bass and backing vocals) and François Jean (drums). Bourgeois, the main songwriter for the band's releases, died in November 2017.

Bourgeois's son, Ludovick Bourgeois, is a pop singer who was the winner of the fifth season of La Voix.

== Discography ==
=== Albums ===
- 1988: Les B.B. (200,000 copies sold)
- 1991: Snob (300,000 copies sold)
- 1994: 3
- 2004: Bonheur facile
- 2011: Univers

Live albums

- 1993: Une nuit avec les B.B. (live album)

Compilation albums

- 2007: Tous les succès

=== Songs / videography ===
(Selective)

- "Loulou"
- "Fais attention"
- "Parfum du passé"
- "T'es dans la lune"
- "Rose café"
- "Snob"
- "Donne-moi ma chance"
- "La Sirène"
- "Seul au combat"
- "Tu ne sauras jamais"
- "Je tends les bras"
- "Autre chose"
- "Dernier mot"
- "Je suis à toi"
- "Univers"
