= Nicola Ciccone =

- Genre: Pop
- Occupations: Singer, songwriter, musician, author
- Instruments: Vocals, piano, guitar
- Years active: 1998 – present
- Website: www.nicolaciccone.com

Nicola Ciccone is a Canadian francophone singer-songwriter, novelist and writer of Italian origin. His songs have been mainly in French but also in English, Italian, and Spanish. He has released 15 albums, which have been nominated for many ADISQ, CRIA, and Juno Prizes. He has also authored three novels (L'Étoile enfant and Dans les yeux d'Ophelia ) and an autobiography (Cuore). Nicola Ciccone has sold 700 000 albums and has had 30 number radio hits.

== Biography ==
Ciccone was born very prematurely, with doctors giving him just 5% of survival, as he recounts in his autobiography, Cuore. Born to parents from Abruzzo, in southern Italy, he lived in the Mile-Ex part of Montreal, which was a very poor area of Montreal's Little Italy area. When he was very young, his father died. Nicola was a victim of bullying at school.

Nicola studied child psychology at Montreal's McGill University. in 1998, he won "Ma Première" held annually for upcoming Canadian artists at Montreal's Place des Arts and soon signed a record.contract He released his debut album, L'Opéra du Mendiant in 1998, which got gold. He then released a number of albums and had chart success with a number of singles.

In 2017, he became a spokesman for Quebec Autism Federation. He also became one of the spokesmen for fondation Charles Bruneau in 2019 and the spokesman for Trouble craniocérébral TCC in 2020.

In September 2021, Ciccone released his 13th album, the musical project "Gratitude." Its release was followed by an important tour. The 12-song record was written during the lockdown, which makes it both touching and universal.

Between 2021 and 2024, Nicola films, La magie des chansons, a series of 14 virtual concerts. Each show is a rendition of one of his albums. It is a success both in Canada and in Europe.

March 2024, Nicola released his 15th album J’t’ai trouvée, j’te garde. The 12 song project celebrates the artist’s 25 years in the music industry. An important tour across Canada followed. The record produced many hit songs and the piece Maman became an internet success.

February 2025, the artist launches the first season of a podcast called The Power of Music. In each episode, he explores the power of songs beyond entertainment. Music has the power to motivate, elevate, bring together and heal.

September 5, 2025, Beautiful Madness, Nicola Ciccone’s 16th album will be released. The record includes 13 original songs in English, drawing from folk, country, rock and blues. The album was written and composed over three decades. It will be followed by an important tour across the country.

He has 30 number one radio hits to his name, several platinum and gold records, he has given thousands of shows across Canada and Europe as well as winning several Felix awards and getting numerous Juno nominations.

== Awards and recognition ==
- 1998: Winner of "Ma Premiere" at Place des Arts
- 2003: Felix Award during the ADISQ Gala for Best Sing for "J't'aime tout court"
- 2007: Felix Award for Best Male Singer
- 2009: Felix Award for Best Male Singer

== Discography ==
=== Albums ===
- 1999: L'Opéra du mendiant
- 2001: Noctambule
- 2003: J't'aime tout court
- 2006: Nous serons six milliards
- 2008: Storyteller
- 2010: Imaginaire
- 2012: Pour toi
- 2013: Il sognatore
- 2014: Les Incontournables
- 2016: Esprit libre
- 2017: Les Immortelles
- 2019: Le long chemin
- 2021: Gratitude
- 2022: L’esprit de Noël
- 2024: J’t’ai trouvée, j’te garde
- 2025: Beautiful Madness

=== Songs and videos ===
(Selective)

- "J't'aime tout court"
- "Chanson pour Marie"
- "Ordinary Man"
- "Innamorati Noi"*
- "Urgence"
- "Pour toi"
- "Celle que tu n es pas"
- "Le petit monde"
- "Oh toi mon père"
- "Le long chemin"
- "La solitude à deux"
- "Pleure"
- "Le petit monde"
- "Nous serons six milliards"
- "Little girl"
- "Superman est une femme"
- "Sache"
- "Inconditionnel"
- "Ils ont fermé le monde"
- "Je veux pas mourir avant d être mort"
- "Oh toi mon père"

== Bibliography ==
- 2013: L'Étoile enfant (novel, Editions Librex/Matita)
- 2015: Dans les yeux d'Ophelia (novel, Editions Librex/Matita)
- 2017: Cuore (autobiography, Editions Libre Expression)
