= Annie Brocoli =

Canadian actress

Annie Grenier (born January 22, 1971) is a singer whose alter ego Annie Brocoli is a children's character in Quebec. Inspired by Grenier's childhood experiences as well as by her two children, Annie Brocoli has adventures while traveling around in a Volkswagen New Beetle, singing and searching for fun. Her audience is mainly parents and children in French-speaking Quebec and in France.

== Early life ==
Grenier was born in Montreal. As a child she suffered from dyslexia.

== Career ==
Grenier created the character Annie Brocoli for a series of children's albums in 1999. One of her best known songs is "Nanas Banana."

Grenier followed by releasing a series of videos in 2000; in 2001 she released the video Annie Brocoli dans l'espace ("Annie Brocoli in Space"). In addition to playing Brocoli, Grenier also wrote, sang and played other characters in these series. That year her album Annie was nominated for a Juno Award for Children's Album of the Year.

Grenier released an animated movie in 2003, Annie Brocoli dans les Fonds Marins (Annie Brocoli Under the Sea), which was a success at the Québec box office. The movie consists of computer graphics produced by Damnfx with Grenier performing via chroma key.

In 2008, Brocoli appeared in a children's television series, "The Broco Show", which was broadcast by Société Radio-Canada.

In 2017, Brocoli performed as part of the Zoofest comedy festival.

In 2018, in response to reduced funding for children's programming in Quebec, Grenier retired her character.

Grenier published a book, En mal des mots, in which she describes her experiences with dyslexia.
