= Marie Carmen =

Canadian musician (born 1959)

- Born: Marie-Carmen Aubut; August 24, 1959 (age 67); Sainte-Foy, Quebec, Canada
- Genre: Pop
- Occupations: Singer-songwriter, musical theatre actress
- Years active: 1980s–2005

Marie Carmen is the stage name of Marie-Carmen Aubut (born August 24, 1959), a Canadian pop singer-songwriter and musical theatre actress born in Sainte-Foy, Quebec.

Associated with the bands Accident, Blood et Marie and The Radio Rats in the early 1980s, she subsequently became a backing vocalist for Claude Dubois and The Box, and was later selected by Luc Plamondon to play the role of Marie-Jeanne in a revival of Starmania. She subsequently released her debut album as a solo artist, Dans la peau, in 1988. She has since released four more studio albums and a greatest hits compilation, and participated in another production of Starmania in 2000, this time in the role of Sadia.

In the early 2000s, she retired from the music business to do humanitarian work in Peru. She returned to Montreal in 2005 to perform several benefit concerts to raise money for development projects in Peru.

In 2020, Carmen, Joe Bocan and Marie Denise Pelletier announced the joint concert tour Pour une histoire d'un soir, although the tour was delayed by the COVID-19 pandemic in Quebec and instead launched in 2022. The tour won the Félix Award for Variety or Reinterpretation Concert of the Year at the 44th Félix Awards.

== Discography ==
- Dans la peau (1988)
- Miel et venin (1992)
- L'Une (1995)
- Déshabillez-moi (1996)
- Les grands succès (1997)
- L'Autre (1998)
- Le Diamant (2008)
