= List of musicians from Quebec =

This is a list of singers, bands, composers and other musicians from the province of Quebec.

== Blues ==
- Garou – also pop
- Okoumé – also néo-trad, rock and electronica
- Roxanne Potvin – singer, guitarist
- David Wilcox

== Chanson ==
- Daniel Bélanger – also electronica
- Dan Bigras – also rock
- Daniel Boucher
- Isabelle Boulay – also country and western
- Paul Cargnello – also rock
- Gregory Charles
- Nicola Ciccone
- Leonard Cohen
- Les Colocs – also ska and Africa-inspired music
- Sylvain Cossette
- Cœur de pirate
- Lhasa de Sela
- Marc Déry – also electronica
- Richard Desjardins
- Beau Dommage
- Georges Dor
- Claude Dubois
- Diane Dufresne – also rock
- Dumas – also electronica
- Jean-Pierre Ferland
- Serge Fiori
- Fred Fortin
- Lewis Furey – also rock
- Claude Gauthier
- Harmonium
- Laurence Jalbert
- Pauline Julien
- Pierre Lapointe
- Plume Latraverse
- Carole Laure – also pop
- Daniel Lavoie – also pop
- Jean Leloup – also rock
- Félix Leclerc
- Lynda Lemay
- Marilou – also pop
- Jérôme Minière – also electronica
- Ariane Moffatt – also electronica
- Kevin Parent
- Bruno Pelletier – also rock and jazz
- Marie Denise Pelletier
- Paul Piché
- Ginette Reno
- Michel Rivard
- Alys Robi
- Richard Séguin
- Stefie Shock – also pop and electronica
- Diane Tell
- Gilles Valiquette
- Gilles Vigneault

== Classical ==
- Tim Brady
- Angèle Dubeau
- Charles Dutoit
- André Gagnon
- Marc-André Hamelin
- Jorane
- Louis Lortie
- Montreal Symphony Orchestra
- Kent Nagano
- Yannick Nézet-Séguin
- André Ristic
- Stéphane Tétreault
- Airat Ichmouratov
- Wonny Song
- Claude Vivier
- Vic Vogel

== Country ==
- Isabelle Boulay – also chanson
- Paul Brunelle
- Terri Clark
- Patricia Conroy
- Willie Lamothe
- Charlie Major
- Marcel Martel

== Folk ==
- Les Cowboys Fringants
- La Bolduc
- La Bottine Souriante
- Patricia Conroy
- Les Cousins Branchaud
- Genticorum
- Wade Hemsworth
- Jeremy Fisher
- Anna McGarrigle
- Kate McGarrigle
- Le Rêve du Diable
- Edouard Richard
- Twin Flames (band)
- Le Vent du Nord
- La Volée d'Castors
- Les Cousins Branchaud

== Electronica ==
- A-Trak
- aKido
- Akufen - a.k.a. Marc Leclair
- Beast
- Daniel Bélanger – also chanson
- Dan Ficara
- Detroit Diesel
- E.P. Bergen
- Bran Van 3000
- Champion - a.k.a. Maxime Morin
- Chromeo
- Lili Fatale – also rock
- Tim Hecker
- Kid Koala
- David Kristian
- Lesbians on Ecstasy
- Jérôme Minière – also chanson
- Misstress Barbara
- Scott Montieth, a.k.a. Deadbeat
- Numéro
- Ghislain Poirier – also hip hop
- Ramasutra
- Tiga

Apashe Black Tiger Sex Machine Adventure Club Infekt Snails Stoned Level Sam Lamar Humansion Ranz Future Exit Krimer Izzy Vadim Tengraphs Wraz Flix Motus

== Heavy metal ==
- The Agonist
- Anonymus – thrash metal
- Augury – technical death metal
- Beneath the Massacre – technical death metal
- Beyond Creation – technical death metal
- Blackguard – melodic death metal
- Cryptopsy – technical death metal, deathcore
- Dead Brain Cells - a.k.a. DBC
- Despised Icon – deathcore
- Drowning In Blood- thrash metal
- Mike Dyball
- Eudoxis – thrash metal
- Forgotten Tales – power metal
- Forteresse - Québécois nationalist black metal
- Gorguts – technical death metal
- Mikey Heppner
- Ion Dissonance – mathcore
- Kataklysm – death metal
- Martyr – Technical death metal
- Mesrine – grindcore
- Neuraxis – technical death metal
- Quo Vadis – technical death metal, melodic death metal
- Slaves on Dope
- Unexpect – avant-garde metal
- Voivod – thrash metal, progressive metal, speed metal
- World on Alert - Progressive metal

== Hip hop ==
- Anodajay
- Atach Tatuq
- A-Trak
- Criollo
- Dead Obies
- Dubmatique
- Jonathan Emile
- Koriass
- Souldia
- Yvon Krevé
- LMDS - a.k.a. Les Messagers du Son
- Loco Locass
- Muzion
- Ghislain Poirier – also electronica
- Sans Pression
- Shades of Culture
- Sixtoo
- Spek
- Alaclair Ensemble

== Humour and irony ==
- Bowser and Blue
- Crampe en masse
- Yvon Deschamps
- François Pérusse
- Serge Robert - a.k.a. Mononc' Serge, also rock and heavy metal
- Rock et Belles Oreilles

== Indie rock ==
- Arcade Fire – also rock
- Bell Orchestre
- Caveboy (band)
- The Franklin Electric
- Fred Fortin
- Half Moon Run
- Hashimoto
- Karkwa
- The Lovely Feathers
- Malajube
- Men I Trust
- Plants and Animals
- The Stills
- Torngat
- Patrick Watson
- We Are Wolves

== International ==
(origin in parentheses)

- Afrodizz
- Qurram Hussain
- Josh (South Asian)
- Kashtin (First Nations)
- Zekuhl (African)

== Jazz ==
- Susie Arioli
- Charlie Biddle
- Alain Caron
- Benoît Charest
- Melody Diachun
- Maynard Ferguson
- Oliver Jones
- Florence K
- Franklin Kiermyer
- Ranee Lee
- Oscar Peterson
- Uzeb
- Nikki Yanofsky
- Karen Young
- Rachel Therrien

== Musique actuelle ==
- René Lussier
- Lauré Lussier

== Néo-trad ==
- Les Cowboys Fringants
- Mes Aïeux
- Okoumé – also blues, rock and electronica
- Swing

== New wave ==
- Norman Bedard - a.k.a. Norman Iceberg
- The Box
- Corey Hart – also pop
- Men Without Hats – also pop
- Rational Youth
- Trans-X
- World On Edge

== Pop ==
- Véronique Béliveau
- Dominique Blais – also rock
- Joe Bocan
- Dan Boeckner
- Claudia Bouvette
- Philippe Brach - also folk
- Busty and the Bass
- Chantal Chamandy
- Chapter 24
- The Dears
- Cindy Daniel
- Maïa Davies
- Céline Dion
- Sara Diamond – also rhythm and blues
- George Donoso
- Lara Fabian
- Mylene Farmer
- Garou – also blues
- Marc Hamilton
- Corey Hart – also new wave
- Luba
- Thomas Hellman
- Sass Jordan
- Kathleen
- Patrick Krief
- Stéphanie Lapointe
- Carole Laure – also chanson
- Daniel Lavoie – also chanson
- Murray Lightburn
- Loud (rapper)
- Lubalin
- Amanda Mabro
- Marie-Mai
- Marilou – also chanson
- Julie Masse
- Men Without Hats – also new wave
- Mitsou – also electronica
- The New Cities
- Aldo Nova
- Mario Pelchat
- Alexei Perry
- Projet Orange – Britpop, also rock
- Martine St. Clair
- Stefie Shock – also chanson and electronica
- Nathalie Simard
- René Simard
- Sky
- Soul Attorneys
- Stars
- Tadros
- Marie-Élaine Thibert
- Gino Vannelli
- Annie Villeneuve
- Roch Voisine
- Martha Wainwright
- Rufus Wainright
- Karl Wolf – also rhythm and blues
- La Zarra
- Zeina

== Punk ==
- Simple Plan
- Banlieue Rouge
- Doughboys
- Grim Skunk
- Groovy Aardvark
- The Nils
- Reset
- Ripcordz
- The Sainte Catherines
- Subb
- Vulgaires Machins
- The 222's

== Reggae ==
- Les Colocs – also chanson and Africa-inspired music

== Rock ==
- Angine de Poitrine
- Arcade Fire
- Melissa Auf der Maur
- Véronique Béliveau
- The Besnard Lakes
- Dan Bigras – also chanson
- Howard Bilerman
- Dominique Blais – also pop
- Bonjour Brumaire
- Bootsauce
- Daniel Boucher
- Gerry Boulet
- Win Butler
- Xavier Caféïne
- Paul Cargnello – also chanson
- Robert Charlebois
- La Chicane
- Les Chiens
- Corbeau
- The Dears
- Martin Deschamps
- George Donoso
- Duchess Says
- Diane Dufresne – also chanson
- Marc Dupré
- Tim Fletcher
- Lewis Furey – also chanson
- Godspeed You! Black Emperor
- Harmonium
- Kaïn
- Kermess
- Andy Kim
- Spencer Krug
- Kyo
- Steve Lang – bassist (April Wine, Mashmakhan)
- Éric Lapointe – also hard rock
- Jace Lasek
- Jean Leloup – also chanson
- Lesbians on Ecstasy – also
- Ced Auger

electronica and punk

- Murray Lightburn
- Lili Fatale – also electronica
- Malajube
- Frank Marino
- Marjo – also chanson
- Efrim Menuck
- Moist
- Katie Moore
- Mystery
- Offenbach
- Okoumé – also néo-trad, blues and electronica
- Liam O'Neil
- Michel Pagliaro
- Paradox
- Bruno Pelletier – also chanson
- Vilain Pingouin
- Priestess
- Projet Orange – Britpop, also rock
- Brendan Reed
- Les Respectables – also pop
- Serge Robert – a.k.a. Mononc' Serge, also humor and heavy metal
- Sam Roberts
- Thee Silver Mt. Zion Memorial Orchestra & Tra-La-La Band
- Marie-Chantal Toupin
- Les Trois Accords
- David Usher
- Vincent Vallières
- Visible Wind
- David Wilcox
- Wolf Parade
- Nanette Workman
- Zébulon

== Rhythm and blues ==
- Corneille
- Luck Mervil
- Karl Wolf – also pop
- Sara Diamond – also pop
- France d'Amour

== Ska, ska punk and ska rock ==
- The Kingpins
- Me Mom and Morgentaler
- The Planet Smashers
- King Apparatus

== Yé-yé ==
- Pierre Lalonde
- Chantal Renaud

== Lyricists ==
- Luc Plamondon

== Children's ==
- Annie Broccoli
- Carmen Campagne

== Miscellaneous ==
- Chantal Condor
- Erik Mongrain

== See also ==
- Chanson
- Culture of Quebec
- List of Quebec festivals
- List of Quebec record labels
- List of Quebecers
- Music of Quebec
- Néo-trad
