= MuchMusic Video Award for Best French Video =

The MuchMusic Video Award for Best French Video was presented from 1995 to 2007, to a music video by a French language recording artist from Quebec.

== Winners and nominees ==
Year	Artist	Video	Ref
1995	Mitsou	"Comme j'ai toujours envie d'aimer"	
1995	France D'Amour	"Vivante"	
1995	Marjo	"Bohémienne"	
1995	Terez Montcalm	"Douce lumière"	
1995	Kevin Parent	"La Jasette"	
1996	Beau Dommage	"Tout simplement"	
1997	Coma	"Carmen"	
1998	Dubmatique	"La Force de comprendre"	
1998	Coma	"Cosmos"	
1998	Les Colocs	"Tassez-vous de d'la"	
1998	Lili Fatale	"Mimi"	
1998	Kevin Parent	"Frequenter l'oubli"	
1999	Lili Fatale	"Les Djinns"	
1999	La Constellation	"Le 7ième jour"	
1999	Les Frères à ch'val	"C'est une chanson"	
1999	Kevin Parent	"Maudite jalousie"	
1999	Rainmen	"Move On"	
2000	Stefie Shock	"Je combats le spleen"	
2000	Daniel Boucher	"Silicone"	
2000	Éric Lapointe	"Mon ange"	
2000	Les Marmottes Aplaties	"Détruire"	
2000	Muzion	"La vie ti neg"	
2001	Projet Orange	"La Pomme"	
2002	Okoumé	"De la terre à la lune"	
2003	Daniel Bélanger	"dans un spoutnik"	
2003	Corneille	"Ensemble"	
2003	Les Cowboys Fringants	"En Berne"	
2003	Les Marmottes Aplaties	"Gagner"	
2003	Vulgaires Machins	"Comme une brique"	
2004	Corneille	"parce qu'on vient de loin"	
2004	Ariane Moffatt	"Poussière d'ange"	
2004	Daniel Boucher	"Le vent soufflait mes pellicules"	
2004	Stefie Shock	"L'amour dans le désert"	
2004	Vulgaires Machins	"Anesthésie"	
2005	Ariane Moffatt	"Fracture du crâne"	
2005	Corneille	"Seul au monde"	
2005	Loco Locass	"Groove Grave"	
2005	Marie-Mai	"Il faut que tu t'en ailles"	
2005	Les Trois Accords	"Saskatchewan"	
2006	Stéphanie Lapointe	"La Mer"	
2006	André	"Yolande Wong"	
2006	Anik Jean	"Tendre sorcière"	
2006	Les Cowboys Fringants	"Plus rien"	
2006	Marie-Mai	"Rien"	
2007	Malajube	"Pâte filo"	
2007	Anodajay and Raoul Duguay	"Le Beat à Ti-Bi"	
2007	Dumas	"Au gré des saisons"	
2007	Damien Robitaille	"Je tombe"	
2007	Vulgaires Machins	"Compter les corps"	
