= DJ Horg =

Canadian DJ

- Also known as: Horg
- Born: Félix-Antoine Leroux
- Genres: Hip hop, boom bap
- Occupations: Record producer; disc jockey; rapper; actor
- Years active: 1985–present
- Member of: 12 Singes; Seba et Horg

Félix-Antoine Leroux, better known as DJ Horg, is a DJ, music producer, rapper, and actor from Quebec, Canada. He is recognized as a foundational figure in Quebec's hip-hop scene. As a child and teenager, Leroux was mainly known for his roles in Paul, Marie et les Enfants (1985–1987), La Grenouille et la Baleine (1987), and Watatatow (1991–1992). In the mid-1990s, Leroux stepped away from acting to become a DJ and hip-hop producer. Using the pseudonym DJ Horg, he released the album Karnageez N' Kombinn Lakaill (1997) with KZ Kombination, which is considered as a regional classic and Quebec's first rap album in Haitian Creole.

Leroux went on to contribute prolifically to the work of numerous Quebec hip-hop artists. However, it was his long collaboration with Samian that earned him the most praise. Leroux produced Samian's first three albums: Face à soi-même (2007), Face à la musique (2011), and Enfants de la terre (2014). At the ADISQ Gala (a Gala to recognise musical achievements in Quebec), the first and third albums were nominated for Best Hip-Hop Album, while the second won.

Other notable works that received ADISQ nominations include Un gars de même (2005) by Sir Pathétik, Et7era (2010) by Anodajay, Radiothérapie (2014) by Dramatik, and Grosso modo (2018) with his duo Seba and Horg.

== Biography ==
=== Acting career and transition to music (1985–1996) ===
From 1985 to 1987, Leroux was one of the main actors in the humorous TV series Paul, Marie et les Enfants. The 57-episode show portrays the daily life of a Quebec family. In 1988, he acted in La Grenouille et la Baleine by Jean-Claude Lord. The film starred Fanny Lauzier as Daphne, a young girl with an exceptional relationship with whales and dolphins due to her highly developed hearing. Her life changes when her grandfather decides to sell the seaside inn where she lives. Leroux played her brother Alexandre. This was the sixth and most popular film in the Contes pour tous series. It was awarded and showcased at various international festivals, with 240,000 viewers in theaters, making it the largest Canadian audience of 1989.

In 1988, he was part of the co-hosting team and played various roles on the Sketch comedy TV show Charamoule. In 1990, Leroux played the role of the Yellow Mage in the second episode of Les Filles de Caleb. In 1991, the show Watatatow began, where he portrayed Bérubé until 1992.

In the mid-1990s, Leroux explained that he moved towards hip-hop and distanced himself from acting. He adopted the name DJ Horg and specialized in scratching and beat production.

In 1996, in the film Le Cri de la nuit, he starred alongside Pierre Curzi and Louise Richer.

=== Early musical career and breakthrough (1997–2007) ===
In 1997, Leroux released the album Karnageez N' Kombinn Lakaill with KZ Kombination. The project became Quebec's first Haitian Creole rap album. Samuel Daigle-Garneau, in his article for HHQC, wrote "Well-received by critics at the time, Karnageez N' Kombinn Lakaill represents an important milestone for hip-hop in Quebec."

In 2000, he produced the scratches for the songs Mar de la vie, Nota Bene, and 1Lov Family on the compilation Montréalité.

Under his artist name, he released the compilation Narcotik sonore in 2001. While producing all the music, he invited a mix of French- and English-speaking Montreal rappers, and on some tracks, he also participated in rapping. Éric Pazarelli, in his review for Le Voir, gave the album four stars out of five. He said, "DJ Horg is a jack-of-all-trades who handles his console brilliantly, scratches with frenzy, and raps with confidence," adding that the artists "lay their voices on assertive rhythms and varied musical atmospheres, crafted in a way that creates an addictive listen with no side effects other than wanting to listen to this compilation on repeat."

That same year, Leroux played the role of a thief in the show Si la tendance se maintient.

In 2002, Leroux worked on the album Street Life by Vaï, producing the scratches for the songs Pour ceux, On fait le tour, and Plus ou moins. In 2003, he worked with Anodajay on the album Premier VII and reunited with him for Septentrion in 2006. In 2004, on Damien's self-titled album, he was a guest artist on the song Moi et les miens.

In 2005, Leroux produced Un gars de même by Sir Pathétik. The following year, the album was nominated at the ADISQ Gala in the hip-hop category.

In 2006, Leroux, along with B.D.S. and Sola, were guest artists on the song Hip Hop from C-drik's album Mon Show Réalité Épisode 1.

In 2007, Samian (Samuel Tremblay) released the album Face à soi-même, which was nominated at the 2008 ADISQ Gala for Hip-Hop Album of the Year. Leroux produced and recorded a significant portion of the album and performed all the scratches. From that point on, Leroux would produce all of Tremblay's albums.

That same year, Leroux played the role of the DJ in the first episode of Bob Gratton: Ma vie, My Life.

=== Subsequent success (2008–2019) ===
In 2008, Leroux mixed, mastered, and produced the scratches for No Reason's album Kill The Messenger.

In 2010, Anodajay's album Et7era was released, with Leroux and the artist credited for production. Anodajay explained that to write to his liking, he sought refuge in Leroux's chalet. Olivier Robillard-Laveaux from Voir gave the album three and a half stars out of five, stating the album was "groovier (even funkier) than it stands out." Marjorie Wirzbicki from Métro described the album as "heterogeneous yet harmonious." Stéphane Martel from Socan Magazine said it was "an album with polished production, devilishly effective funky grooves, and even more refined arrangements." The following year, the album was nominated in the hip-hop category at the ADISQ Gala.

In 2011, Leroux recorded the EP Antidote for artist Le Dud. That year, Samian's album Face à la musique won in the hip-hop category at the ADISQ Gala.

Leroux, various rappers, and hiphopfranco.com supported the 2012 Quebec student strike. They expressed it on the compilation Printemps érable. He also joined the collective 12 Singes.

In 2013, he recorded Scamp's album. That year, he was a guest artist on the song L'union fait l'écorce from D-Track's album Abris-Tempos.

In 2014, Samian released the album Enfants de la terre, with Leroux handling music production. They created an album blending jazz, classical, slam, and Reggae sounds. That year, another of Leroux's projects, Radiothérapie by Dramatik, was also released. Both albums were nominated in the "Album of the Year – Hip-Hop" category at the ADISQ Gala.

In 2014, Leroux composed for the documentary Les Sceaux D'Utrecht by Paul Bossé.

In 2018, Leroux participated in the song Anti-système with S-Claves Modernes and Cavaliers noirs. That same year, Leroux hosted Sur le corner on CIBL-FM and had rapper Seba (Éric Brousseau) as a guest. Leroux and Brousseau were friends during their studies at Cégep du Vieux Montréal in the 1990s, and they crossed paths again at the 2008 ADISQ Gala. After the show, they decided to form the duo Seba and Horg. The same year, they released the album Grosso modo, and their first single Vintage à l'os became a success, with 1.6 million views on Facebook and 125,000 on YouTube. They were nominated in the "Album of the Year – Hip-Hop" category at the ADISQ Gala.

In 2019, they received a nomination for "Music Video of the Year" at the ADISQ Gala for their Music video Magasin à un dollar. The video featured several Quebec personalities, including France Castel, Fabien Dupuis, Guillaume Lemay-Thivierge, Guylaine Tremblay, Patricia Paquin, Richard Martineau, Gino Chouinard, Yves P. Pelletier, and Ghislain Taschereau.

Also in 2019, Samian released Le Messager, which Leroux produced. It was Samian's first album in five years. Together, they continued making music in support of Indigenous causes. Samian said that for this album, he wanted it to reflect the passion for hip-hop that he shares with Leroux.

=== Current work (2020–present) ===
In 2020, Leroux was part of the direction for the 11th edition of the Gala des prix Numix. That same year, he became a columnist for the show Montréal dans ta pipe. He also took on the role of composer for the show L'effet secondaire, which he worked on until the program's final episode in 2022.

In March 2023, Leroux and his band Lionel Groove released their self-titled album, which embodies a musical fusion, blending disco, funk, and rap elements. Sam Faye and Leroux were the driving forces behind the group.

In August 2023, Leroux collaborated with Paul Cargnello on the album This is a Change. The album marked a fusion of genres, with Cargnello singing, rapping, and playing guitar, while Leroux created boom-bap rhythms and scratches. Philippe Renaud from Le Devoir gave the album three and a half stars out of five, praising its engaged themes, inspired bass lines, and relevant musical energy, noting its success in this innovative musical exploration. Renaud also pointed out that the album deliberately stands out from contemporary trends, making it a bold artistic experience.

That same year, Leroux collaborated with the New York-based group Lordz of Brooklyn, releasing the single ''As Long As I Write'' in tribute to the art of graffiti. This collaboration was made possible through a publicist friend who connected him with Kaves, the group's leader. Leroux, impressed by Kaves' graffiti and painting talents, stated, "One of the greatest honors I've ever received was having the opportunity to make my first American collaboration with the legendary Lordz of Brooklyn, especially since Kaves designed the cover."

Also in 2023, an exhibit about Quebec's Hip Hop took place at the Musée de la civilisation to recognize its cultural impact on the region. In it, Leroux's equipment from his early career was showcased and was listed as a founding member of Quebec's Hip Hop culture.

On November 15, 2024, Leroux is releasing the compilation La Pièce de collection, aimed at celebrating his thirty-year career. It contains 12 tracks that he considers among his best.

== Partial discography ==
=== Albums ===
- 2001: Narkotik sonore
- 2018: Grosso modo – with Seba et Horg
- 2023: Lionel Groove – with Lionel Groove
- 2023: This is a Change – collaborating with Paul Cargnello

=== Compilations ===
- 2012: Printemps érable
- 2024: La pièce de collection

=== Singles ===
- 2023: "As Long As I Write" – collaborating with The Lordz of Brooklyn

=== Production ===
- 1997: Karnageez n' Kombinn Lakaill – by KZ Kombination
- 2005: Un gars de même – by Sir Pathétik
- 2007: Face à soi-même – by Samian
- 2009: Rester Vrai – by Mathieu Lacroix
- 2010: Et7era – by Anodajay
- 2011: Face à la musique – by Samian
- 2014: Enfants de la terre – by Samian
- 2014: Radiothérapie – by Dramatik
- 2019: Le Messager – by Samian

=== Guest ===
- 2004: Damien – Moi et les miens (on the album Damien)
- 2006: C-drik – Hip Hop (on the album Mon Show Réalité Épisode 1) – with B.D.S. and Sola
- 2013: D-Track – L'union fait l'écorce (on the album Abris-Tempos)

== Filmography ==
=== Actor ===
==== Film ====
- 1987: La Grenouille et la Baleine – Alexandre
- 1996: Le Cri de la nuit – Nathael

==== Television ====
- 1985 – 1987: Paul, Marie et les Enfants – Gabriel
- 1988: Charamoule – Multiple roles
- 1991 – 1992: Watatatow – Bérubé
- 1990: Les filles de Caleb – Mage Jaune
- 2001: Si la tendance se maintient – Thief
- 2007: Bob Gratton : Ma vie, My Life – Dj

=== Host ===
- 2020 to present day: Montréal dans ta pipe

=== Composer ===
- 2014: Les Sceaux D'Utrecht
- 2020 – 2022: L'effet secondaire
