= Star Académie =

Canadian reality television series

Star Académie is a Canadian reality television series that started in 2003, aimed primarily at the Quebec television audience, featuring an array of young women and men under the age of 30 competing for the title of the next solo singing sensation. It is the French-Canadian adaptation of the French television show Star Academy produced by Dutch company Endemol, based on the Spanish format called Operación Triunfo.

There have been seasons in 2003, 2004, 2005, 2009, and 2012. In June 2019, TVA stated that a reboot for Star Académie was possible. Two months later, the network announced that the reboot is set for early 2021. On September 22, 2020, it was announced that singer Patrice Michaud would take over Julie Snyder as host for the 2021 season. In June 2021, Michaud stated that he would not return as host for the following season. In August 2021, it was announced that singer-songwriter Marc Dupré would replace Michaud as host in 2022.

== Description ==
It is aired for two months (February to April) on the TVA network. Hosted by Julie Snyder, the show is a competition to find the best young francophone singer, not only in Quebec, but also in French-speaking regions of Canada, having auditions in Ontario (Eastern Ontario) and New Brunswick (l'Acadie). Then fourteen people (seven of each gender) are chosen to compete in front of the cameras.

It is separated in two simultaneous formats: each day during the week, a show presents moments of the life and training in the common house of the Académiciens and each weekend sees one Gala show where the contenders sing. At each of these Galas, some participants are put on the line and one is chosen to stay by the public and by the judging panel.

It proved to be immensely popular, drawing not only viewership, but genuine affection from the public for the young idealistic contenders. Pride also arises for the regions where the participants are from, like pride was felt by many from the Acadian people when Wilfred Le Bouthillier, from Acadia, was chosen for the competition and later crowned winner of the first, 2003 edition.

It has also proved to be an effective springboard for the singing careers of some of its past participants, like 2003 finalists Wilfred Le Bouthillier, who recorded with the help of renowned Cajun singer Zachary Richard, and Marie-Élaine Thibert, who also released an album and sung for the soundtrack of Léa Pool's movie The Blue Butterfly.

The show was on a 4-year hiatus due to the second pregnancy of the hostess and her busy schedule with Le Banquier, the French-Canadian version of Deal or No Deal.

== Origins ==
It is inspired by the French show Star Academy and is similar to the Pop Idol and American Idol phenomena. The name was francized for its Quebec adaptation because of the local importance given to the respect of the French language. However, it does create a grammatically impossible phrase in French. The proper translation would be Académie des stars, although this could be considered less catchy. Francization is typically given even more importance in Quebec French than in France itself (see Office québécois de la langue française).

A relatively small, but notable difference in the show format from its French counterpart is the selection process. Each week, the French version asks the public and judging panel to vote for which one, out of the contenders in danger, should be excluded from the show. The results are announced live, on stage, to the excluded member and the viewers. While this formula was followed in the beginning for Star Académie, it soon was changed because of protests, for the system was seen as cruel treatment to the excluded participant. On one early show, singer Daniel Boucher quit the studio halfway through the show because of this impression. Consequently, the public and judges are now asked to vote for the participant to remain at the Académie. In all seasons, the results are announced live.

== Criticism ==
Star Académie drew criticism for the capitalist and vertical integration strategies of producing megacompany Quebecor to publicize the show and make it profitable. For example, each vote from the public costs one dollar, the website is in large part reserved to paying members and the Quebecor company, massive owner of many Quebec media, heavily promoted the show via TVA (its own television network), all of its magazines and newspapers like 7 Jours and Journal de Montréal. The voting method was changed for the 2025 season, where people can vote for free via TVAd website.Astral Media's RockDétente also did a lot of heavy promoting themselves during the 2005 edition, as the official stations of Star Académie. Also were criticized the instant celebrity machine and supposed lack of artistic integrity aspects of the whole enterprise.

== Theme songs ==
- 2003: Et c'est pas fini by Stéphane Venne
- 2004: Un nouveau jour va se lever by Jacques Michel
- 2005: L'étoile d'Amérique by Claude Léveillée
- 2009: 1000 coeurs debout by Cali
- 2012: Toi + Moi by Grégoire
- 2021: Maintenant et partout by Hubert Lenoir and Jérôme 50
- 2022: Changer le monde by Laurence Nerbonne
- 2025: Ne partez pas sans moi by Céline Dion

== Champions ==
- 2003: Wilfred Le Bouthillier from Tracadie–Sheila, New Brunswick
- 2004: Stéphanie Lapointe from Brossard, Quebec
- 2005: Marc-André Fortin from Hébertville, Quebec
- 2009: Maxime Landry from Saint-Gédéon-de-Beauce, Quebec
- 2012: Jean-Marc Couture from Val-d'Amour, New Brunswick
- 2021: William Cloutier from Victoriaville, Quebec
- 2022: Krystel Mongeau from Sherbrooke, Quebec
- 2025 : Mia Tinayre from Quebec City, Quebec

== Académie's principal ==
- 2003: Josélito Michaud
- 2004: Denise Filiatrault
- 2005: Denis Bouchard (René Simard had retired before the show started)
- 2009: René Angélil
- 2012: René Angélil
- 2021: Lara Fabian
- 2022: Lara Fabian
- 2025: Garou

== Notable guests ==
Here's all the guest performers in Star Académie.

- Bryan Adams
- Charles Aznavour
- Beau Dommage
- Plastic Bertrand
- Daniel Boucher
- Isabelle Boulay
- Jean Charest
- Céline Dion
- The Lost Fingers
- Éric Lapointe
- Stromae
- Patricia Kaas
- Lady Gaga
- Lara Fabian
- Samantha Fox
- Roger Hodgson
- Bernard Landry
- Daniel Lavoie
- Claude Léveillée
- Marjo
- Jason Mraz
- Paul Piché
- Michel Rivard
- Natasha St-Pier
- Kreesha Turner
- Gino Vannelli
- Roch Voisine
- Dennis DeYoung
- Les Trois Accords
- Hedley
- These Kids Wear Crowns
- Lionel Richie
- Mika
- Charlotte Cardin

== Discography ==
=== Official albums ===
- 2003: Star Académie - (5× Platinum)
- 2004: Star Académie 2004
- 2004: Star Académie 2004: Meilleurs moments des finalistes aux galas
- 2005: Star Académie 2005
- 2009: Star Académie 2009
- 2012: Star Académie 2012 - (2× Platinum)
- 2012: Star Académie Noel - (Platinum)

=== Contestants' albums ===
==== First season (2003) ====
- 2003: Wilfred Le Bouthillier by Wilfred Le Bouthillier
- 2004: Marie-Élaine Thibert by Marie-Élaine Thibert
- 2004: Comment J'feel by Maritza Bossé-Pelchat
- 2004: Inoxydable by Marie-Mai Bouchard
- 2004: Ent'chums by Dave Bourgeois, François Babin, Stéphane Mercier
- 2004: Légendes Urbaines by Émily Bégin
- 2005: Quand je ferme les yeux by Annie Villeneuve
- 2005: Sortilège by Élyse Robinault
- 2006: Poussières by Wilfred Le Bouthillier
- 2007: Dangereuse Attraction by Marie-Mai Bouchard
- 2007: Comme ça by Marie-Élaine Thibert
- 2007: Voila by Stéphane Mercier
- 2007: Dave Bourgeois by Dave Bourgeois
- 2007: Emily by Émily Begin
- 2008: The Open Book by Élyse Robinault
- 2008: Suzie Villeneuve by Suzie Villeneuve
- 2009: Droit devant by Wilfred Le Bouthillier
- 2009: Version 3.0 by Marie-Mai Bouchard
- 2009: Annie Villeneuve by Annie Villeneuve
- 2011: Les nuits d'Émily by Émily Bégin
- 2012: C.O.B.R.A. by Marie-Mai Bouchard
- 2012: Telle qu'elle by Annie Villeneuve

==== Second season (2004) ====
- 2004: Corneliu Montano by Corneliu Montano
- 2005: Sur le fil by Stéphanie Lapointe
- 2005: Tête première by Meggie Lagacé
- 2005: Marc-André by Marc-André Niquet
- 2005: Faut que j'te dise by Martin Giroux
- 2006: On s'en reparlera by Dave Roussy
- 2006: Je l'ai jamais dit à personne by Étienne Drapeau
- 2007: C'est pas de ma faute by Jean-Francois Prud'homme
- 2007: Le coeur qui chante by Corneliu Montano
- 2008: En cavale by Martin Giroux
- 2008: Étienne Drapeau by Étienne Drapeau
- 2009: Maintenant...Femme by Marie-Ève Côté
- March 10, 2009: Donne-moi quelque chose qui ne finit pas by Stéphanie Lapointe
- March 23, 2010: La vie ça s'mérite by Martin Giroux
- September 2010: Paroles et Musique by Étienne Drapeau
- November 2011: Influences by Corneliu Montano

==== Third season (2005) ====
- 2007: Marc-André Fortin by Marc-André Fortin
- 2007: Dans mon espace by Bruno Labrie
- 2007: Je suis qui je suis by Linda Rocheleau
- 2007: Sur l'autre rive by Annie Blanchard
- 2008: L'enfant roi by Marc Angers
- 2008: Ad vitam by Audrey Gagnon
- 2009: Juste ici by Marc-André Fortin
- 2010: Marcher vers le nord by Annie Blanchard

==== Fourth season (2009) ====
- 2009: Vox Pop by Maxime Landry
- May 18, 2010: Un pied à terre by William Deslauriers
- May 25, 2010: Chacun son chemin by Pascal Chaumont
- January 2011: Fruits défendus by Brigitte Boisjoli
- November 2011: L'avenir entre nous by Maxime Landry
- April 2012: Le goût du bonheur by Émilie Lévesque
- 2013 "J'suis la" by François Lachance.

== Contestants ==
Winners in bold.

=== 2003 ===
- François Babin from Rimouski, Bas-Saint-Laurent
- Jean-François Bastien from Saint-Boniface, Mauricie
- Émily Bégin from Saint-Jérôme, Laurentides
- Dave Bourgeois from Baie-Comeau, Côte-Nord
- Maritza Bossé-Pelchat from Montreal, Montreal Region (born in the Dominican Republic)
- Marie-Mai Bouchard from Boucherville, Montérégie
- **Wilfred Le Bouthillier** from Tracadie–Sheila, New Brunswick
- Stéphane Mercier from Normétal, Abitibi-Témiscamingue
- Pascal Nguyen-Deschênes from Charlesbourg, Capitale-Nationale
- Élyse Robineault from Montréal-Nord, Montreal Region
- Martin Rouette from Montreal, Montreal Region
- Marie-Élaine Thibert from LaSalle, Montreal Region
- Annie Villeneuve from Jonquière, Saguenay
- Suzie Villeneuve from Jonquière, Saguenay

=== 2004 ===
- Véronique Claveau from Rimouski, Bas-Saint-Laurent
- Marie-Ève Côté from Brossard, Montérégie
- Étienne Drapeau from Quebec City, Capitale-Nationale
- **Stéphanie Lapointe** from Brossard, Montérégie
- Meggie Lagacé from Saint-Hubert, Montérégie
- Jannie Lemay from Rouyn-Noranda, Abitibi
- Marie-France Lettre from Gatineau, Outaouais
- Cornéliu Montano from Montreal, Montreal Region (born in Romania)
- Marc-André Niquet from Pierreville, Centre-du-Québec
- Dave Roussy from Port-Daniel, Gaspésie
- Jason Battah from Joliette, Lanaudière
- Sandy Duperval-Agnant from Montreal, Montreal Region
- Jean-François Prud'homme from Saint-Donat, Lanaudière
- Martin Giroux from Gatineau, Outaouais

=== 2005 ===
- David Tremblay, from Jonquière, Quebec
- Marc Angers, from Boucherville, Quebec
- Steve Provost, from Saint-Faustin, Quebec
- Audrey Gagnon, from Jonquière, Quebec
- Annie Blanchard, from Maisonnette (Caraquet), New Brunswick
- Jennifer Silencieux, from Montreal, Quebec
- Francis Greffard, from Rapide-Danseur, Quebec
- Jenny Hachey (leaves after the first gala, on September 18), from L'Annonciation, Quebec
- Kaven Haché, from Sainte-Anne-des-Monts, Quebec
- Linda Rocheleau, from Saint-Bruno-de-Guigues, Quebec
- Stéphanie Bédard, from Drummondville, Quebec
- **Marc-André Fortin**, from Hébertville, Québec
- Valérie Boivin, from Montreal, Quebec
- Bruno Labrie, from Châteauguay, Quebec

=== 2009 ===
- Karine Labelle, Huberdeau, Laurentides
- Joanie Goyette, Saint-Tite, Mauricie
- Brigitte Boisjoli, Drummondville, Centre-du-Québec
- Carolanne D'Astous-Paquet, Sayabec, Bas-Saint-Laurent (finalist)
- Sophie Vaillancourt, Laval, Laval
- Vanessa Duchel, Prévost, Laurentides
- Émilie Lévesque, Saint-Malo, Estrie
- Rich Ly, Montreal, Montreal
- Pascal Chaumont, La Conception, Laurentides
- Jean-Philippe Audet, Quebec City, Capitale-Nationale
- Olivier Beaulieu, Drummondville, Centre-du-Québec
- **Maxime Landry**, Saint-Gédéon-de-Beauce, Chaudière-Appalaches (winner)
- William Deslauriers, Plessisville, Centre-du-Québec
- Maxime Proulx, Plaisance, Outaouais

==== Through the weeks ====
| Contestant | Week 1 | Week 2 | Week 3 | Week 4 | Week 5 | Week 6 | Week 7 | Week 8 | Week 9 |
|---|---|---|---|---|---|---|---|---|---|
| Maxime L. | Saved by judges | Non evaluated | Saved by public | Non evaluated | Saved by judges | Non evaluated | Saved by public | Non evaluated | **Winner** |
| Carolanne | Non evaluated | Saved by public | Non evaluated | Saved by judges | Non evaluated | Saved by public | Non evaluated | Saved by public | Finalist |
| Brigitte | Non evaluated | Saved by judges | Non evaluated | Saved by judges | Non evaluated | Saved by judges | Non evaluated | Eliminated (Week 8) | |
| Émilie | Non evaluated | Saved by judges | Non evaluated | Saved by public | Non evaluated | Saved by judges | Non evaluated | Eliminated (Week 8) | |
| Sophie | Non evaluated | Saved by judges | Non evaluated | Saved by judges | Non evaluated | Saved by judges | Non evaluated | Eliminated (Week 8) | |
| Jean-Philippe | Saved by judges | Non evaluated | Saved by judges | Non evaluated | Saved by judges | Non evaluated | Eliminated (Week 7) | | |
| Pascal | Saved by judges | Non evaluated | Saved by judges | Non evaluated | Saved by judges | Non evaluated | Eliminated (Week 7) | | |
| William | Saved by judges | Non evaluated | Saved by judges | Non evaluated | Saved by public | Non evaluated | Eliminated (Week 7) | | |
| Joanie | Non evaluated | Saved by judges | Non evaluated | Saved by judges | Non evaluated | Eliminated (Week 6) | | | |
| Rich | Saved by judges | Non evaluated | Saved by judges | Non evaluated | Eliminated (Week 5) | | | | |
| Vanessa | Non evaluated | Saved by judges | Non evaluated | Eliminated (Week 4) | | | | | |
| Maxime P. | Saved by public | Non evaluated | Eliminated (Week 3) | | | | | | |
| Karine | Non evaluated | Eliminated (Week 2) | | | | | | | |
| Olivier | Eliminated (Week 1) | | | | | | | | |
| Eliminated | **Olivier** | **Karine** | **Maxime P.** | **Vanessa** | **Rich** | **Joanie** | **Jean-Philippe**; **Pascal**; **William** | **Brigitte**; **Émilie**; **Sophie** | |

- During the first Gala, Vanessa and William were chosen by the public. Also, Émilie and Maxime P. were chosen by the judges.
- During weeks 7 and 8, the contestants were automatically in danger.

The contestant was in danger and eliminated
The contestant was in danger but saved by the judges during the gala
The contestant was in danger but saved by the public during the gala
The contestant wins the competition

=== 2012 ===
- Andréanne A. Malette, Granby
- Bryan Audet, Saint-Élie-de-Caxton
- Andrée-Anne Leclerc, Saint-Jean-Chrysostome
- François Lachance, Alma
- Carole-Anne Gagnon-Lafond, Rimouski
- Jason Guérette, Sainte-Anne-de-Madawaska
- Joannie Benoit, Tracadie-Sheila
- **Jean-Marc Couture**, Val-d'Amour, New Brunswick
- Mélissa Bédard, Quebec City
- Mike Lee (Jean-Mickaël Lavernay), Montréal (born in Réunion)
- Sarah-May Vézeau, Repentigny
- Olivier Dion, Sherbrooke
- Sophie Pelletier, Rivière-Ouelle
- Simon Morin, Le Gardeur

==== Through the weeks ====
| Contestant | Gala # 1 2012-01-22 | Gala # 2 2012-01-29 | Gala # 3 2012-02-05 | Gala # 4 2012-02-12 | Gala # 5 2012-02-19 | Gala # 6 2012-02-26 | Gala # 7 2012-03-04 | Gala # 8 2012-03-11 | Gala # 9 2012-03-18 | Gala # 10 2012-03-25 |
|---|---|---|---|---|---|---|---|---|---|---|
| Jean-Marc | Saved by judges | Not in danger | Non evaluated | Not in danger | Non evaluated | Not in danger | Non evaluated | Saved by public | Non evaluated | **Winner** |
| Sophie | Saved by judges | Non evaluated | Not in danger | Non evaluated | Not in danger | Non evaluated | Not in danger | Non evaluated | Saved by public | Finalist |
| Andréanne A . | Saved by judges | Non evaluated | Saved by judges | Non evaluated | Not in danger | Non evaluated | Saved by judges | Non evaluated | Eliminated (Gala 9) | |
| Andrée-Anne L. | Saved by judges | Non evaluated | Not in danger | Non evaluated | Saved by judges | Non evaluated | Not in danger | Non evaluated | Eliminated (Gala 9) | |
| Mélissa | Saved by public | Non evaluated | Not in danger | Non evaluated | Not in danger | Non evaluated | Saved by public | Non evaluated | Eliminated (Gala 9) | |
| Mike Lee | Saved by judges | Saved by public | Non evaluated | Saved by public | Non evaluated | Not in danger | Non evaluated | Eliminated (Gala 8) | | |
| Jason | Saved by judges | Saved by judges | Non evaluated | Not in danger | Non evaluated | Saved by public | Non evaluated | Eliminated (Gala 8) | | |
| Olivier | Saved by public | Not in danger | Non evaluated | Not in danger | Non evaluated | Saved by judges | Non evaluated | Eliminated (Gala 8) | | |
| Joanie | Saved by judges | Non evaluated | Not in danger | Non evaluated | Saved by public | Non evaluated | Eliminated (Gala 7) | | | |
| Bryan | Saved by judges | Not in danger | Non evaluated | Saved by judges | Non evaluated | Eliminated (Gala 6) | | | | |
| Sarah-May | Saved by judges | Non evaluated | Saved by public | Non evaluated | Eliminated (Gala 5) | | | | | |
| François | Saved by judges | Not in danger | Non evaluated | Eliminated (Gala 4) | | | | | | |
| Carole-Anne | Saved by judges | Non evaluated | Eliminated (Gala 3) | | | | | | | |
| Simon | Saved by judges | Eliminated (Gala 2) | | | | | | | | |
| Eliminated | **Carolane Cloutier**; **Jennifer Tessier**; **Kelly Blais**; **Alexandre Bélair**; **Francis Sigouin-Allan**; **Marc-André Valade** | **Simon** | **Carole-Anne** | **François** | **Sarah-May** | **Bryan** | **Joanie** | **Jason**; **Mike Lee**; **Olivier** | **Andreéanne A.** **André-Anne L.** **Mélissa** | |

- During the first Gala, out of 20 candidates, 14 were selected to go to the Academie, 6 female candidates and 6 male candidates were saved by the Judges without performing. 1 female and 1 male candidates were saved by the public based on a vote on their performance.
- During Gala 8 and 9, the contestants were automatically in danger. (Gala 8 = Male, Gala 9 = Female)

The contestant was in danger and eliminated
The contestant was in danger but saved by the judges during the gala
The contestant was in danger but saved by the public during the gala
The contestant wins the competition

== See also ==
- List of Quebec television series imports and exports
- List of Quebec television series
- List of Quebec musicians
- List of Quebec regions
- Television of Quebec
- Music of Quebec
- Culture of Quebec
- Vidéotron
- The One: Making a Music Star (English adaptation broadcast on ABC and CBC)
