= Boies =

Boies is both a surname and a given name. Notable people with the name include:

== Surname ==
- David Boies (born 1941), American lawyer
- Horace Boies (1827–1923), American politician from Iowa
- Jean-Christophe Boies, Canadian musician
- Jean-Sébastien Boies, Canadian musician
- John K. Boies (1828–1891), American politician
- Mary Boies (born 1950), American lawyer and businesswoman
- William Dayton Boies (1857–1932), American politician from Iowa

== Given name ==
- Boies Penrose (1860–1921), American lawyer and politician from Pennsylvania
- Jeremiah Smith Boies De Veber (1830–1908), Canadian politician and businessman

== See also ==
- Boies, Schiller & Flexner, American law firm founded by David Boies and Jonathan Schiller
- Boie
- Boyce (disambiguation)
