= Boie =

Boie is a surname. Notable people with the surname include:

- Friedrich Boie (1789–1870), German entomologist, herpetologist, ornithologist, and lawyer
- Heinrich Boie (1794–1827), German zoologist
- Heinrich Christian Boie (1744–1806), German author
- John Boie (born 1991), American wheelchair basketball player
- Kirsten Boie (born 1950), German children's book author and activist
- Margarete Boie (1880–1946), German writer

== See also ==
- Boies, a surname and given name
