= Stéphanie Lapointe =

Canadian singer and actress (born 1984)

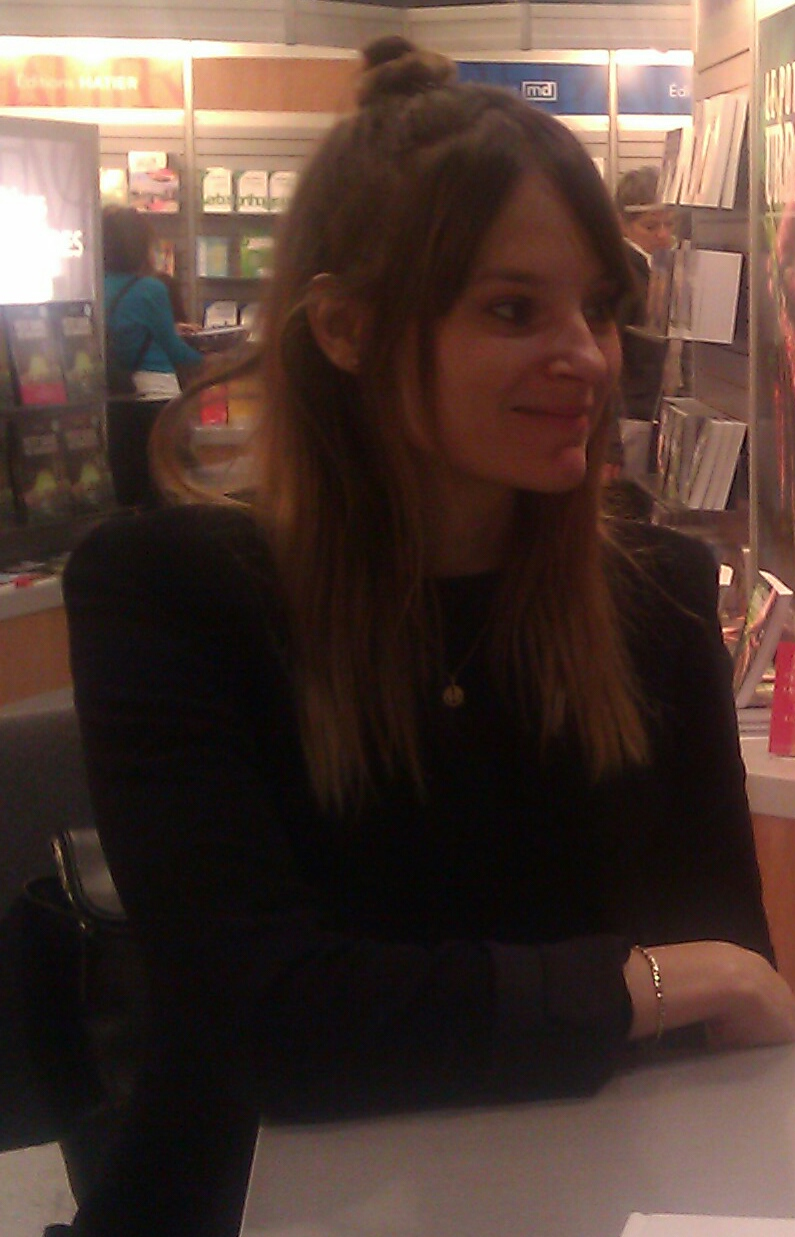
- Lapointe in 2016

Background information
- Born: 26 March 1984 (age 42)
- Origin: Brossard, Quebec, Canada
- Genres: Pop, soft rock
- Years active: 2005–present
- Label: Les Disques Musicor
- Website: stephanielapointe.mu

Stéphanie Lapointe (born 26 March 1984) is a Canadian singer, songwriter, actress and humanitarian activist from Quebec. She is best known as the winner of the second season of Star Académie.

== Background ==
=== Musical and acting development ===
Lapointe discovered and developed her interest in music as a young child. It was in 1992, at the age of 8, that she had her first piano lessons at her elementary school in Brossard (formerly Longueuil) a southern suburb of Montreal. In 1996, right after finishing primary school, she traveled to France for a school extracurricular and educational activity. It was there she made her debut in theatrical plays. Her trip to France marked the moment she discovered an interest in the world of acting.

In 2001, at the age of 17, Lapointe became a member of a group which performed musical comedies. She then played in various other plays, including a French remake of (Beauty and the Beast), as well as other French plays such as Aida, and Once on This Island. While in France, she also followed several dance classes. At the same time, she continued to develop her skills in music and theatrical acting. The lessons later proved important for her future roles in Quebec television reality shows and movies starting in 2005.

While refining her acting skills, Lapointe studied at Collège Édouard-Montpetit in humanities.

=== Star Academie experience ===
Two songs from Lapointe made the second compilation of songs from participants in 2004.

In 2003, TVA's reality show Star Académie, a remake of France's Star Academy, debuted. Lapointe, while in France, never auditioned for the French edition prior to returning to Quebec. She first auditioned for Star Académie in 2003 but had a greater success the following year, on the series second season, when she impressed the three judges. During the performances as a top-ten finalist, she delivered several impressive performances, full of emotion and sensitivity. Despite her timid nature and calm demeanor, she was known by the public for her energetic performances including rock hits such as Green Day's "American Idiot". During the season, she faced elimination only once, in March 2004, but was saved by the public. While being in danger of being sent off, she considered abandoning everything. After being saved by the public, she gained more confidence throughout the remainder of the gala. At the finale, she won the 2004 crown, defeating Marc-André Niquet. She is currently the only female winner in the reality show's three-season history.

Her hits "L'infidèle" (previously performed by Claude Dubois and "Si fragile" (previously performed by Luc de la Rochelière) from the Star Académie 2004 album, also aired on French radio stations across Quebec prior to her debut album. The Star Académie 2 album was certified double platinum within two days of its release date.

=== Debut album: Sur le fil (2005) ===
Lapointe's 2005 debut album, Sur le fil

Following her province-wide tour with the 2004 Star Académie finalists, in which she acquired more confidence and self-esteem, she immediately started recording her first album, Sur le fil, produced by Francis Collard. The album was launched and debuted on 30 August 2005, at the Vidéotron headquarters in Montreal. The event was held in front of several well-known personalities, including Star Académie and Le Banquier host Julie Snyder and one of the competition's judges and La Presse editor Stéphane Laporte. The album itself is composed of many ballads and love songs. Her first two hits, "Nous sommes" and "La mer", performed very well on the French charts, with the former hitting the top spot on the RockDétente Top 20 Countdown. A third hit, "Je sais déjà", played on French radio stations and TV station MusiquePlus in December 2006.

Singers Catherine Durand, Projet Orange frontman Jean-Christophe Boies and Sylvie Paquette, as well as writers Dave Richard and Martine Coupal, participated in the composition of Sur le fil. Lapointe wrote portions of the final two songs, "Love You" and "Interlude", along with Dave Richard. As of November 2006, 30,000 copies of the album were sold across Quebec and it was, at one point in September 2005, the francophone album with the most copies sold provincewide. In 2006, she also participated in the debut album of writer and journalist Tristan Malavoy as she provided background vocals in one of Malavoy's songs.

The videoclip of "La Mer" was directed by video and scene director Dominique Laurence, who also directed clips for songs by Ariane Moffatt, Jean-François Breau, former Star Académie season 2 finalist Martin Giroux and season 1 winner Wilfred Le Bouthillier.

=== Second album ===
She completed her contract with Musicor and, in March 2009, released her second album, entitled Donne-moi quelque chose qui ne finit pas (Give me something that doesn't end). Pierre Lapointe (not related) wrote two songs for it, "Une fleur" (A flower) and the duet "À quoi" (What are you thinking). She also recorded a French version of Cher's "Bang Bang" song.

=== Awards and nominations ===
Due to the success generated by the album, she was nominated for Breakthrough Artist of the Year in 2006 at the ADISQ music gala and was a Juno nominee for Francophone Album of the Year.

At the 2006 MuchMusic Video Awards, she won the award for Best Francophone Video for her song la "Mer".

=== Performances ===
Lapointe started to perform various shows as guest artist across the province in 2004, including concerts with Quebec singer Isabelle Boulay, as well as on Quebec television shows. She also performed at the Saint-Jean Chrysostome Hot Air Balloon Festival and another, entitled Show de filles, at the Gatineau Hot Air Balloon Festival in September 2006, which also featured Marjo and fellow Star Académie contestants Émily Bégin and Annie Villeneuve from the first season. Heavy rain due to the remnants of Hurricane Ernesto affected the turnout at the show which was estimated at 15 000 spectators. She also made a province-wide tour in 2006 and 2007 called Sur le fil which debuted in Montreal's le Gésu. Most of the critics praised her softness and her charming voice.

=== Acting career ===
While her musical debut was a success, despite modest record sales, she also appeared on television in the mini-series Le Négociateur (The Negotiator) which aired on the French television network TVA starting in 2005 with the second season airing during the fall of 2006. Lapointe played the role of Colette Cloutier, the sister of the show's main character, Mac Cloutier, a journalist and a negotiator, played by Frédérick de Grandpré. She returned in the same role for the series' third chapter, which was filmed during the fall of 2006 and aired in 2008.

In movie roles, she appeared in Aurore, which opened in French theaters across the province of Quebec in the summer of 2005. She played the role of Marie-Anne Caron, the young biological mother of Aurore Gagnon, a girl who was fatally abused by her stepmother and her father after the death of her birth mother from tuberculosis. Film director Luc Dionne initially balked at her participation in the movie, but later accepted after Denise Robert, the co-founder of Quebec movie company Cinémaginaire Inc., urged Dionne to give Lapointe a real opportunity for the role of Marie-Anne Caron.

=== Care Canada, humanitarian and community involvement ===
Lapointe is involved in various community causes and participated in the Opération Enfant Soleil telethon in 2005 while performing Sting's "Fields of Gold" song. She adores the outdoors, wildlife and nature and was the spokesperson for the project "Au sommet pour Care" launched by Care Canada. In order to raise funds for the organization, she climbed Mount Kilimanjaro, the highest peak in Central Africa, in 2005 along with 24 other Canadians. During an interview with reporter Nathalie Petrowski of the Montreal newspaper La Presse, Lapointe revealed that if she was to abandon music, she would like to be heavily involved in helping humanitarian groups, as she notably travelled across several countries in conjunction with her participation at the Care Canada mission. Lapointe also made, in 2007, a Quebec-wide tour for Unicef-Quebec as Ambassador, along with actress Catherine Brunet, to discuss and sensitize the public on the issue of worldwide child poverty, particularly in Africa, just prior to the Halloween. In May 2007, she made a humanitarian trip to Mali and the Sahel region, and met up with a non-governmental organization which planned to set up a new school in the region. In April 2008, Lapointe, along with Laurence and producer Eza Paventi, planned a tour of the Darfur region of Sudan in order to produce several small documentaries on African migrations, for Radio-Canada.

In addition to her humanitarian work, Lapointe had also been pro-active in regards to global environment. During her appearance on Star Académie, she made a statement to the Quebec government of Jean Charest towards an improved provincial policy on recycling. Lapointe mentioned in the Quebec magazine Le Privé that the environment and other world issues will be significant topics for her upcoming album. In addition, she also encouraged schools to discuss more on such major global issues.

== Personal life ==
She is married to music video director Dominique Laurence. Their daughter, Marguerite Laurence, is a child actor who made her feature film debut in the 2024 film Miss Boots (Mlle Bottine).

== Filmography ==
Film

- Aurore, 2005: Marie-Anne Caron, Aurore's mother
- Fear of Water (La Peur de l'eau), 2011: Rosalie Richard
- Liverpool, 2012: Émilie

Television

- Le Négociateur (2005): Colette Cloutier
- Le Négociateur 2 (2006): Colette Cloutier
- Le Négociateur 3 (2008): Colette Cloutier

== Discography ==
- Star Académie 2 (2004) – "Si fragile", "L'infidele"
- Sur le fil (2005)
- Donne-moi quelque chose qui ne finit pas (2009)

== See also ==
- List of Quebec musicians

Preceded by Wilfred Le Bouthillier	Winner of Star Académie; 2004	Succeeded by Marc-André Fortin
