= Septentrion (album) =

Studio album by Anodajay
- Released: June 27, 2006
- Genre: Rap
- Length: 60:13
- Language: French
- Label: 7ième Ciel (Canada); CIE2-2200 (CD)

Anodajay chronology
Le 7 secondes… (EP) (2005)	Septentrion (2006)

Singles from Septentrion
- 1. "Le beat à Ti-Bi"; 2. "L'homme de bois"

Professional ratings
Review scores
Source	Rating
Bande à part	(7.3/10)
HHQC	4/5 stars
HipHopFranco	(favorable)
Voir	4/5 stars

Septentrion is an album by Anodajay released on June 27, 2006 on his independently owned record label 7ième Ciel Records. The album is Anodajay's second studio album. "Le beat à Ti-Bi" won the Best French Video award at the Sounds of Blackness Awards in 2007. The same video was also a nominee for the Best French Video category at the MuchMusic Video Awards in 2007.

== Track listing ==
1. "Septentrion (intro)"
2. "À quoi ça rime ?"
3. "Bonjour" (featuring Accrophone)
4. "Où sont les soldats ?"
5. "Une belle dame"
6. "Trop smooth" (featuring Boogat)
7. "Septimo (instrumental)"
8. "Intime au 7ième"
9. "My Man"
10. "Laissez-moi voler"
11. "Comme un pro" (featuring DJ Horg)
12. "Garde la tête haute"
13. "L'homme de bois"
14. "Tous nés pour mourir" (featuring Muzion)
15. "Désolé"
16. "Pars pas"
17. "Le beat à Ti-Bi" (featuring Raôul Duguay)
