= Sophie Vaillancourt =

Canadian singer, model, and teacher (born 1986)

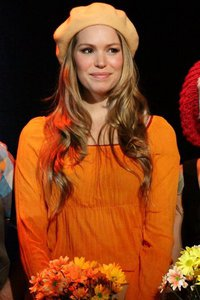
- Sophie Vaillancourt posing for the announcement of the new Big Bazar show
- Born: February 18, 1986 (age 40); Montreal, Quebec, Canada
- Occupations: Singer, model, teacher
- Musical career
- Genres: Middle of the road
- Instruments: Voice, piano, oboe, flute
- Label: Productions J

Sophie Vaillancourt (born February 18, 1986) is a Canadian singer, model, and teacher. She is known for competing in the TV show Star Académie and for working as one of the models on the set of Le Banquier. She plays several instruments and has two degrees in teaching from the University of Montreal.

== Biography ==
Born in Montreal, Quebec, Vaillancourt started taking violin lessons at age 4. She subsequently took lessons in piano, oboe, and flute. At age 19, she became a model for the agency Folio Montreal.

Her singing career began in 2009 when she went on the reality TV show Star Académie. As part of the show, she contributed to the album Star Academy 2009. The album contains her rendition of "Et dans 150 ans" by Raphaël. It has sold over 210,000 copies to date, becoming a double platinum hit. She went on tour performing several shows around Quebec, including a show at the Bell Center.

She also sang "Fuir le bonheur de peur qu'il ne se sauve" by Serge Gainsbourg as a duet with Maxime Landry. The duet recording was featured on the double platinum album Vox pop. The song rose quickly on the Quebec charts.

In 2010, she took the role of the love doll in the musical Big Bazar and received positive critical review for her performance in the role.

Vaillancourt was also one of the beauties on the TV show Le Banquier, the Quebec version of Deal or No Deal, holding suitcase No. 2 in the 2009 and 2010 seasons.

In 2011, she finished a bachelor's degree in preschool and primary education at the University of Montreal. As of 2013 Vaillancourt was teaching at an elementary school in Sainte-Dorothée and working on a master's degree in special education at the University of Montreal.

As of February 2018, Vaillancourt was a Club Med GO in the Americas teaching fitness classes, performing in various nightly ensemble shows and singing to backing tracks at dinner events.

== See also ==
- Star Academie
- University of Montreal
- Le Banquier
- Deal or No Deal
