= André (band) =

Canadian rock band

- Origin: Montreal, Quebec, Canada
- Genres: Pop music Punk rock
- Years active: 2001–2009
- Label: Anubis Records
- Past members: Maxime Philibert; Frédérick St-Onge; Louis Therrien-Galasso; David Bussières; André Papanicolaou

André was a rock band from Montreal, Quebec, Canada. The band was made up of Maxime Philibert (guitar, vocals), Frédérick St-Onge (drums, vocals) Louis Therrien-Galasso (bass, guitar, vocals), and guitarists André Papanicolaou and David Bussières.

Between 2001 and 2009, the band released four albums and its music was included in three compilations. The band received a MuchMusic Video Award nomination for Best French Video at the 2006 MuchMusic Video Awards for "Yolande Wong".

== Discography ==
=== Singles ===
Year	Song	Album
2006	L'amour en 2 couleurs process	Les Derniers Modèles de la mode masculine
2006	Station Balnéaire	Les Derniers Modèles de la mode masculine
2006	Yolande Wong	Les Derniers Modèles de la mode masculine

=== Albums ===
Year	Album
2008	Le Thé Et La Justice
2006	Les Derniers Modèles de la mode masculine
2006	Compilation Dans la marge depuis 15 ans
2004	Compilation Québec Émergent
2003	Dans le sous-sol de Carlos
2003	Compilation Riposte L'Alternative Urbaine
2001	En route vers l'album brun
