= Dix Mille Matins =

Studio album by Daniel Boucher
- Released: October 12, 1999
- Length: 49:04
- Label: GSI Musique

Daniel Boucher chronology
Dix Mille Matins (1999)	La Patente (2004)

Dix Mille Matins is an album recorded by Daniel Boucher between November 1998 and August 1999. It was originally released in 1999. Dix Mille Matins is the first album released by Daniel Boucher. Two years prior to this album, Daniel Boucher was already proclaimed as the end of decade's revelation in Quebec as he won the "Festival en chanson de Petite-Vallée" (Gaspésie). In 2000, he won at the "l'adisq" for this album. The album was certified Gold by the CRIA in July 2002.

== Track listing ==
All tracks by Daniel Boucher except where noted.

1. "La Désise" – 4:56
2. "Aidez-moi" – 4:14
3. "Un inconnu" – 4:53
4. "Ma croûte" – 1:22
5. "Silicone" – 3:40
6. "Délire" – 4:17
7. "Boules à mites" – 5:43
8. "Ça" – 2:59
9. "Le Poète des temps gris" (Boucher, Eric DeSève, Daniel Grégoire, Jonathan Ménard) – 4:55
10. "Deviens-tu c'que t'as voulu?" – 4:51
11. "Le Nombril du monde" – 7:14

== Personnel ==
- Frédéric Beauséjour – arranger, bass
- Réjean Bouchard – arranger, bas
- Daniel Boucher – guitar, arranger, voices
- Guy Dubuc – arranger, clavier
- Daniel Hubert – arranger, bass
- Jean Charles Labarre – concept graphics
- Marc Lessard – percussion, arranger, drums
- Marc Pérusse – guitar, arranger, realization
- Paul Picard – percussion

== Year-end charts ==
Year-end chart performance for Dix Mille Matins
Chart (2001)	Position
Canadian Albums (Nielsen SoundScan)	183
