= Lili Fatale =

- Origin: Montreal, Quebec, Canada
- Genres: Pop music, Cold wave (music), Electro (music)
- Years active: 1994–2001
- Label: Sony Music
- Members: Nathalie Courchesne; Richard Valmont Binette; Uranian Valcéanu; Martin Beaulieu; Manix Laliberté; Francis Fillion; Jean-François Doré; Nicolas Ouellette; Yanik Daunais

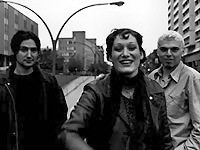
Photo of Lili Fatale in Montréal in 1999

Lili Fatale is a Canadian pop music group from Montreal, Quebec. They have called their music "the meeting between French and British pop, with Cold wave (music) and Electro (music) stylings.

== History ==
=== Lili Fatale (1994–1999) ===
Lili Fatale was formed in 1994, by Nathalie Courchesne (vocals, keyboards, guitar), Richard Valmont Binette (guitar, drums, keyboards, vocals), Uranian Valcéanu (guitar, vocals) and bassist Martin Beaulieu. Their name was inspired by Gérard Lauzier's comic strip of the same name.

In 1996, the band signed with Sony Music Canada; in 1997, their first album Lili Fatale was released. In French markets, it was released under the title CK80296. Two songs from the album, "Feels" and "Mimi", got extensive radio play; "Mimi" sold 20,000 copies in Quebec and 10,000 copies in France. The video for the song "Les Djinns" won the 1999 MuchMusic Video Award for Best French Video. At the 1998 ADISQ Awards, the album's producer, Michel Pépin, was nominated as Soundmaker of the Year, Arranger of the Year, and Record Director of the Year. The album was nominated for Album of the Year - Alternative Rock, and the video for "Feels" was nominated for Video of the Year. The band was nominated for Group of the Year and won the Félix award for Revelation of the Year. The band also won the Félix Leclerc Prize for Song.

In 1998, they played about sixty halls and festivals in Quebec and the rest of Canada, then went on a tour of Europe, playing at events such as the Printemps de Bourges and Les Francofolies de La Rochelle.

=== Panavision (2001–present) ===
Lili Fatale's second studio album, Panavision, was released in early 2001. The French singer-songwriter Jérôme Minière appears on the album, which was also produced by Michel Pépin. By the end of the year, 20,000 copies had been sold in Quebec; the charting single was "Depuis que tu es parti". At the 2001 ADISQ Awards, Michel Pépin was nominated as Arranger of the Year, and Record Director of the Year. The album was nominated for Album of the Year - Alternative Rock.

Despite this success, in December 2001, Sony opted not to renew the band's contract. Richard Binette left the band to return to school; Valcéanu and Courchesne, who had had a child, decided to do the same and put the project on hold.

Courchesne continued with music, performing with the group El Motor in 2006, and performing a piece on the soundtrack of the 2007 Bryan Perro multimedia show Éclyps. She also collaborated on a song by the group With All Due Respect on their 2010 EP, Torrent. In 2015, Courchesne and Valcéanu, along with Francis Fillion, Nicolas Ouellette, and Yanik Daunais independently released the EP Sous la Neige, la Plage (Under the Snow, the Beach), which is three updated versions of previously unreleased songs.

In 2019, the band's hit songs "Feels" and "Mimi" each received a SOCAN Classic Award at the 30th SOCAN Gala in Montreal.

== Discography ==
=== Albums ===
- Lili Fatale (a.k.a. CK80296), 1997, Sony Music
- Panavision, 2001, Sony Music

=== EPs & singles ===
- Mimi, 1997, Columbia
- Ange De Ville, 2001, Sony Music
- Sous la Neige, la Plage, 2015, Independent
