= Stefie Shock =

- Born: Stéphan Caron; 1969 (age 55–56); Montréal, Québec, Canada
- Occupation: songwriter-multi-instrumentalist-producer-DJ
- Years active: 2000–present
- Website: stefieshock.com

Stéphan Caron, better known by his stage name Stefie Shock, is a songwriter, multi-instrumentalist, producer and DJ from Montréal, Québec, Canada. He has released 8 albums since 2000.

== Discography ==
- Presque rien (2000)
- Le Décor (2003)
- Les Vendredis (2006)
- Tubes, remixes et prémonitions (2009) (compilation)
- La mécanique de l'amour (2011)
- Avant L'aube (2014)
- 12 belles dans la peau (2016), 12 covers of Serge Gainsbourg songs with twelve French-Canadian actresses and singers: Klô Pelgag, Gaële, Fanny Bloom, Laurence Nerbonne, Pascale Bussières, SuzieMcLelove, Anne Dorval, Marie-Pierre Arthur, Marième, Evelyne Brochu, Sophie Beaudet, Stéphanie Lapointe.
- Le fruit du hasard (2019)
- Presque tout, Vol. 1 (2020) (compilation)
- Godfree - LP1 (special issue)
- Le décor (Édition spéciale 20e anniversaire)

== Awards ==
- 2001: Rapsat-Lelièvre prize (Belgium)
- 2001: Socan prize "popular song" Amalgame (Les Respectables)
- 2002: Félix-Leclerc prize (at the FrancoFolies de Montréal)
- 2004: Félix Award at the ADISQ gala, Pop-rock Album, for Le Décor
- 2006: Socan prize "popular song" Ange gardien
- 2008: Socan prize "popular song" Pixel flous
- 2012: Socan prize "popular song" Un jour sur deux

== See also ==
- List of Quebec musicians
- Music of Quebec
- Culture of Quebec
