= Boyce =

Boyce may refer to:

== Places ==
=== Australia ===
- Mount Boyce, Blue Mountains range, New South Wales

=== United States ===
- Boyce, Louisiana
- Boyce, Tennessee
- Boyce, Virginia
- Boyce Park, a 1,096-acre (444 ha) county park in Allegheny County, Pennsylvania. It is a part of the county's 12,000-acre (4,900 ha) network of nine distinct parks

== People ==
- Boyce (surname)

=== Fictional ===
- Boyce (Green Wing), character from the British sitcom Green Wing
- Boycie (Terrence Aubrey Boyce), character from the British sitcoms Only Fools and Horses and The Green Green Grass played by John Challis
