= Les Cousins Branchaud =

- Origin: Sainte-Ursule, Quebec, Canada
- Genres: Folk
- Years active: Early 1990s-2025
- Members: Claude Branchaud; Guy Branchaud; Luc Croisetière; Paul-André Nadeau; Patrick Desmarais; David Tavares
- Website: www.lescousinsbranchaud.com

Les Cousins Branchaud are a traditional folk group from Sainte-Ursule, Quebec. The group is known for their energy on stage as they put their own spin on old classiques and original traditional-style songs.

== History ==
The group was formed in the early 1990s by Claude Branchaud (mandolin, vocals), Guy Branchaud (guitar, vocals) and Luc Croisetière (percussion, vocals) to raise money for the Make a Wish Foundation. In the fall of 1994, Paul-André Nadeau (violinist, guitarist, vocals) joined the group. After playing at many volunteer and folk shows, they gradually established their name in the region. In 1997, Patrick Desmarais joined the group and brought along his instrumental skill with the accordion, harmonica, rebec and vocals.

In 2000, Les Cousins Branchaud produced their first album, Swing la don' dans ton salon, which includes songs that are traditional within the families of each member.

In 2001, David Tavares (bass, guitar, vocals) joined the group leaving it at its current six members.

In 2002, by public demand, they produced a second album, Lorsque le verre est plein, which includes, once again, traditional family folk songs.

In 2003, Les Cousins Branchaud were part of a compilation album which also included other traditional québécois folk groups such as La Bottine Souriante, La Volée d'Castors, Baqqhus, Les Charbonniers de l'enfer and several others.

In 2004, again due to public demand, they put out their third album, Equipé pour veiller tard.

2007 was a big year for Les Cousins Branchaud, as they produced their fourth album, Passer du bon temps, and were invited for the first time to play at the World Folk Festival in Drummondville, Quebec.

In 2025, they announced that they would disband.

== Members ==
Guy Branchaud (guitar, vocals) is one of the four founding members of Les Cousins Branchaud. He has also been part of the group "Les Multivox" for many years.

Claude Branchaud (mandolin, guitar, vocals) is also one of the four founding members and Guy's brother.

Luc Croisetière (percussion, vocals) was finally able to achieve his dream of playing music when he joined Les Cousins Branchaud after retiring from his career as a farmer.

Paul-André Nadeau (violin, guitar, mandolin, vocals) has been playing the violin since the age of five. In the last two years, he has also become part of a country music group called "Nash."

Patrick Desmarais (accordion, harmonica, jig, vocals) has also been part of the group "Les Frères Bellavance" for the last ten years.

David Tavares (bass, guitar, vocals) has played the bass since the age of eleven and studied musique at the CEGEP in Trois-Rivières and now teaches musique in his own school, "Les Claviers Magiques." He also belongs to several other bands.

== Discography ==
- 2000 Swing la don’ dans ton salon
- 2002 Lorsque le verre est plein
- 2004 Equipé pour veiller tard
- 2007 Passer du bon temps
