= Margarete Boie =

German author

- Born: Margarete Ida Boie; 22 October 1880; Berlin, German Empire
- Died: 4 February 1946 (aged 65); Lüneburg, Allied-occupied Germany
- Occupations: Author; Journalist
- Parent(s): Bernhard Boie (1839–1896); Ida Vennigerholz (1850–1936)

Margarete Boie (22 October 1880 – 4 February 1946) was a German writer. Many of her most successful books appeared in the 1920s, and incorporate the history, landscape and people of Sylt as themes.

== Life ==
Margarete Ida Boie was born in Berlin, the third of her parents' five recorded children. Bernhard Boie (1839–1896), her father, was an army officer originally from Danzig. Her mother was born Ida Vennigerholz (1850–1936). Her father's military career meant that during her childhood the family relocated frequently, living in a succession of north German garrison towns, latterly in Thorn where Bernhard Boie held the post of military governor. Thorn is where, when Margarete was sixteen, her father died unexpectedly. After a year her mother moved the family again, first to Zoppot on the north German coast and from there to Danzig. It was in Danzig, with the encouragement of her friend, that she embarked on a professional career, obtaining a job with the Natural History Museum, which at that time was under the directorship of the remarkable Hugo Conwentz.

Inspired by recent developments in Sweden, Conwentz at this time was working on a national framework of statutory legal protection for the natural environment, with a focus on identifying and conserving areas of special scientific interest. Working for him at the Natural History Museum between 1902 and 1904 gave Boie her first sustained encounter with the world of nature conservation, which became a defining theme for the rest of her life. At the same time she recognised that as a woman without appropriate professional qualifications, scope for professional advancement in the world of museums was limited. According to one source it was at around this time that she accordingly decided that she should find a form of work that would enable her to be self-employed.

It was probably while living in Danzig that Margarete Boie teamed up with the artist an illustrator Helene Varges. The two became firm friends and then life partners. Later, when Margarete Boie became a published author, Varges would provide illustrations for her books. Between 1904 and 1928 the two of them lived and worked together as pioneers in nature conservation, successively on Juist and Norderney, and in Emden, Lüneburg and, most importantly, on Helgoland and then Sylt. In 1906 Boie launched her writing career with the book "Juist", although the fact that she had to pay to publish it for herself made for an inauspicious career launch. With vivid and detailed descriptions of the animal and plant life on the island it made a compelling case for preserving the natural heritage of the place; while viewed as a scholarly travel guide it presented an accessible and practical view of the conceptual ideas she had picked up from Conwentz.

The two women relocated to Sylt in 1911 and then to Helgoland where they had a contract from the island's Biological Institute to produce scientific illustrations. They worked together to create scientifically based information boards for the institute, and in the process Boie deepened her own biological knowledge. Helgoland appears to have been their last island home for the time being, and when they had completed their work on Helgoland they moved to the mainland and settled in Lüneburg where they appear to have remained till after the end of the First World War. Between 1908 and 1919 Margarete Boie was listing as a contributing editor – and for a time also as a chief editor – on the "Lüneburgischer Anzeiger" (newspaper). She worked initially under the direction of the chief editor Dr. Corssen. She later got to know his family and deep friendships were formed with them. Her youthful energy and gender combined with the nature of her work as a journalist meant that she quickly became part of a network of Lüneburg's more influential citizens, which also involved establishing contacts with the literary establishment of the time and place. Self employed freelance authors who were also women were few and far between: the personal contacts that Boie was able to build up during her time at the newspaper would stand her in good stead as she established and built her writing career after the war ended.

"The more Humanity makes itself Lord of the Earth, the more acute becomes the responsibility to cherish, to nurture – to protect."

"Je mehr der Mensch sich zum Herrn der Erde macht, desto ernster wird die Verantwortlichkeit, zu hegen, zu pflegen – zu schützen."

Margarete Boie in "Ferientage auf Sylt", 1928

Later in 1919 Boie and Varges moved back to Sylt. Since 1906 Boie had published various small pieces, but in 1919, aged not quite 40, while still in Lüneburg, she published what is regarded as her first full novel. Although most of her 28 full-length books are classified as novels, they incorporate much that is factual, both in terms of the landscape and historical reality and, in many some cases, including real people and depicting contemporary events of which she had first-hand knowledge. Her 1919 book was published under the title, "Die Kinder der fremden Frau" (loosely: "The children of the strange woman"). She had already, the previous year, produced "Das köstliche Leben" ("The Precious life"), which was not a novel at all but contained impressions of Sylt that she had acquired during earlier visits to the island. "Schwestern" ("Sisters"), in which she describes the changing seasons of island life in a twelve chapter volume that takes one chapter for each of the twelve months, followed in 1921. "Der Sylter Hahn" ("The Sylt Rooster") which appeared in 1925 was an historical novel with a real historical figure, Lorens Petersen de Hahn (1668–1774), as its principal protagonist. The first part of the book deals with a sea voyage on a whaling ship, but after returning home to Sylt from the seas around Greenland the hero becomes a "beach inspector" who manages to wean fellow islanders off lives devoted to beach combing. "Moiken Peter Ohm" published in 1926 describes a woman's life in Sylt around 1800. "Die letzten Sylter Riesen" ("The Last Giants on Sylt", 1930) deals with the years between 1830 and 1850 with the two "Sylt Giants" as the lead characters, land owners Uwe Jens Lornsen and Schwen Hans Jensen, engaged in the struggle for an independent Schleswig-Holstein. The historical context was based on records provided by the nineteenth century Sylt chronicler Christian Peter Hansen. The next major work, appearing later in 1930, represented something of a contrast. "Dammbau, Sylter Roman aus der Gegenwart" (Building a Dam, a contemporary Sylt novel) deals with the challenges and conflicts surrounding the construction of the Hindenburg Dam, completed in 1927, and more important as a causeway than as a dam. It provided a permanent rail link between Sylt – hitherto an island – and the mainland. The "novel" includes extensive technical details of the causeway and its construction. As portrayed by Boie, the impact on the lives of the islanders was permanent and profound. More than eighty years after it first appeared, this is one novel by Margarete Boie that continues to draw readers and generate discussion. Many of Boie's books appeared with illustrations and other adornments contributed by Helene Varges.

The bracing climate of Germany's northern islands, which others visited for the health benefits, proved deleterious to Boie's well-being. In 1928 heart disease forced her to move away from Sylt and from her friend who remained there. During the 1930s she continued to write, while looking for places to live that suited her health better. She moved to Thuringia, a region of central Germany almost as far from the sea as any, where she lived for a time in Oldenburg and in Erfurt. She then moved to Berlin where she lived for most of the Second World War till driven out by the extent of the aerial bombing. The sought shelter with her brother's family in Bohemia, but had to flee again, this time to Upper Bavaria, as the invading armies moved in from the east and the south. By 1946 fate had drawn her back to "Salt City" (as Lüneburg was sometimes affectionately identified by the residents). She still had cousins in the area willing to come to town to attend a book presentation on behalf of their eccentric author-aunt. In February 1946 as she was walking with her thirteen year old nephew towards the cinema in the city centre she suffered a heart attack and died. Over on Sylt Helene Varges died less than two months later.

== Output (selection) ==
- Das köstliche Leben. J. F. Steinkopf, Stuttgart 1918.
- Schwestern. Der Jahreslauf einer Insel. J. F. Steinkopf, Stuttgart 1921.
- Die treue Ose. Sage von der Insel Sylt. Bücherstube von C. L. Jensen, Westerland 1922.
- Der Auftakt. J. F. Steinkopf, Stuttgart 1922.
- Bo, der Riese. Bookshop of C. L. Jensen, Westerland 1923.
- Führer von Sylt. Johs Cords, Westerland 1925.
- Der Sylter Hahn. J. F. Steinkopf, Stuttgart 1925.
- Waal – Waal! J. F. Steinkopf, Stuttgart 1926 (Youth edition of Der Sylter Hahn).
- Moiken Peter Ohm. J. F. Steinkopf, Stuttgart 1926.
- Ferientage auf Sylt. with 20 illustrations by Helene Varges. H. Bermühler, Berlin-Lichterfelde 1928.
- Die letzten Sylter Riesen. Compiled from the records of a contemporary. J. F. Steinkopf, Stuttgart 1930.
- Dammbau. Sylter Roman aus der Gegenwart. Steinkopf, Stuttgart 1930 (6. Auflage 1985). New edition: Husum 2012, ISBN 978-3-89876-610-4.
- Sylter Treue. Zwei Sagen von der Insel Sylt. J. F. Steinkopf, Stuttgart 1932.
- Eine Wandlung. Agentur d. Rauhen Hauses, Hamburg [1932].
- Die Müllerin von Tholensdeich. Agentur d. Rauhen Hauses, Hamburg 1933.
- Eleonora Christine und Corfiz Ulfeldt. Lebensroman einer Königstochter. Gerh. Stalling, Oldenburg 1936.
- Der alte Bauer. Agentur d. Rauhen Hauses, Hamburg [1936].
- Wie Lorens der Hahn auf Grönland fuhr. J. Beltz, Langensalza 1937.
- Auf Walfang im Eismeer. Heckner, Wolfenbüttel 1937.
- Uwe Jens Lornsen in Kiel. J. Beltz, Langensalza 1938.
- Hugo Conwentz und seine Heimat. Ein Buch der Erinnerungen. Steinkopf, Stuttgart 1940.
- Die Tagfahrt der Preußen. J. F. Steinkopf, Stuttgart 1942.
- Übers Jahr … Steinkopf, Stuttgart 1944.
