= Samian (rapper) =

Canadian rapper (born 1983)

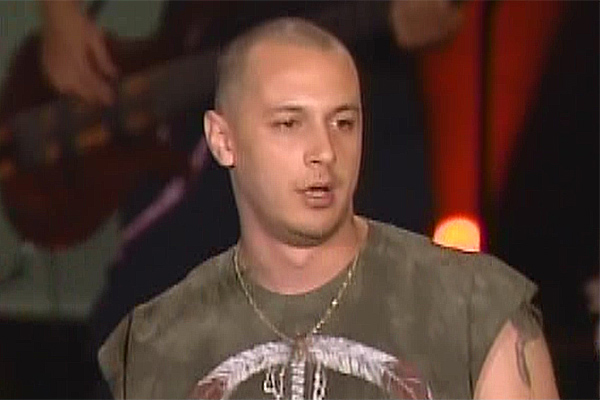
- Samian in 2008

Background information
- Born: Samuel Tremblay; 11 July 1983 (age 42); Pikogan, Quebec, Canada
- Genres: Hip hop
- Occupations: Rapper, actor
- Years active: 2001-present
- Label: 7ième Ciel

Samuel Tremblay (French pronunciation: [samɥɛl tʁɑ̃blɛ]; born 11 July 1983), better known by his stage name Samian, is a Canadian rapper who performs in both French and Algonquian.

== Biography ==
A member of the Abitibiwinni First Nation, Samian was born in Amos and grew up in the community of Pikogan in Abitibi-Témiscamingue and in several other cities in the province of Quebec. His father is Québécois and his mother is Algonquin. He was first noted by participating in the Wapikoni film project in 2004 and would later perform on stage with the Quebec Rap group Loco Locass.

In 2005, Samian collaborated on several projects with Canada's National Film Board, the Department of Indian Affairs and HARRO décrochage scolaire (school dropout Network), AIDS and problems related to compulsive gambling.

In 2006, he won first prize for best music video for his clip Courage at the United Indigenous Peoples Festival in Pau, France. During this festival, he will play the first part of Florent Vollant, member of Kashtin music group. He was the first musician to sing in both French and Algonquin. He is an inspiration to many Aboriginal youth. His popularity is growing since his revelation to the Festival Voix d'Amérique (America's Voices Festival).

The same year, he met with Anodajay and wrote the song "La Paix des Braves", which referred to the agreement signed respecting a new relationship between the Cree Nation and the Government of Quebec. The song became his first single. Loco Locass later invited Samian to perform his song on stage at the Place des Arts in Montreal during the Loco Locass Symphonique event.

He released his debut album, Face à soi-même, in 2007 on Anodajay's 7ième Ciel Records. He has performed across Canada and internationally, including shows in France, Spain, Finland, China and at the 2010 Winter Olympics in Vancouver.

In 2007, he was one of the spokesmen at the Quebec Social Forum with Paul Piché and Raoul Duguay.

At the Saint-Jean-Baptiste Day festivities on June 24, 2008, Loco Locass and Samian performed "Paix des Braves" in front of tens of thousands of spectators at Maisonneuve Park, as well as millions of viewers on television.

His 2010 album Face à la musique includes a hip hop remake of Kashtin's "Tshinanu". His rendition does not sample the original recording; instead, he collaborated directly with the members of Kashtin on a new recording of the song's guitar line and chorus.

On May 2, 2010, he appeared on Tout le monde en parle, bringing awareness to the fact that the Algonquin language was endangered.

In 2013, he acted in the Quebec film Rock Paper Scissors (Roche papier ciseaux) alongside Roy Dupuis.

On August 4, 2014, Samian did a concert at the Festival Présence Autochtone, held at Place des Festivals in Montreal, where he was joined by several guests including Loco Locass and Kathia Rock.

In 2014, Samian also took part in a program which was broadcast on APTN titled Le Rhythme. Alongside Dany Bédar, Samian was the mentor of several Aboriginal musicians, singers, writers and performers, aged 18 to 30, guiding them through an artistic journey of intensive training, ultimately leading them to the recording of their first album as a group.

He has also had acting roles in the films Scratch (2015), Hochelaga, Land of Souls (2017), Bootlegger (2021), The Inhuman (2021) and Aller Simple (2022). He won the award for Best Actor at the 2022 American Indian Film Festival for L'Inhumain.

He was a Felix Award nominee for Indigenous Artist of the Year at the 44th Félix Awards in 2022.

== Discography ==
- Face à soi-même (2007)
- Face à la musique (2010)
- Enfant de la terre (2015)
