= Dominique Blais =

- Occupations: Guitar teacher, musician
- Instrument: Guitar
- Website: web.archive.org/web/20120210163849/http://www.dominiqueblais.com/

Dominique Blais is a guitar teacher for various public and private educational establishments, and was also involved in more than fifty recording projects in Montreal, Toronto, Moncton, Edmundston, New York and Los Angeles.

In addition to working at Steve Vai's personal home studio in Hollywood and being guitar player for Radio-Canada (CBC) Television, Blais has produced several albums; some nominated for awards at the Canadian Country Music Awards and the East Coast Music Awards.

Until 2003, while vice-president of The Show Must Go On Productions, a concert promotion company based in Canada and USA, he organized and promoted many concerts and special events and toured with North American and European artists, both in Canada and in the USA. He promoted concerts for many artists such as Motorhead, Vince Neil (Mötley Crüe), The Misfits, Anthrax, Voivod, Marky Ramone, Skid Row and others.

Since then, Dominique Blais devotes his time to teaching classes within the "Music Business Administration" program at Montreal's Trebas Institute and SODRAC (Society for Reproduction Rights of Authors, Composers and Publishers in Canada) where he has worked for many departments, namely Recruitment and Member Services as well as Audio Licensing (Independent labels) and Audiovisual Licensing (Videocopy Distribution).

== Discography (Guitar, Production and/or Radio Promotion only*) ==
1996 : La Boîte à Chansons, Compilation (Montreal, Qc, Canada)
1997 : Toile de vie, Beatoven (Montreal, Qc, Canada)
1997 : Noir et blanc*, Beatoven (Montreal, Qc, Canada)
1997 : La quarte des quatres, Radio-Canada (Moncton, N.-B., Canada)
1997 : Harper's March, Harper's March (Hollywood, CA, USA)
1998 : Rue St-Denis, Daniel Simard (Montreal, Qc, Canada)
1978 : Vendredi 4hrs, Etienne Deschènes (Edmundston, N.-B., Canada)
1978 : J’aime mieux être pauvre*, Guy Pharand (Montreal, Qc, Canada)
1978 : Promise You Forever*, Dan Nash (Calgary, AB, Canada)
1978 : L’As de Vegas*, Jean-Pierre Fortin (Montreal, Qc, Canada)
1978 : Lever haut la main, Beatoven (Montreal, Qc, Canada)
1978 : People and Places*, Max Bennett (Los Angeles, CA, USA)
1978 : La Voie*, Patrick Marty (Montreal, Qc, Canada)
1999 : On n’est pas sorti de l'Auberge, Dragon Rouge (Montreal, Qc, Canada)
1999 : Caroline*, Phil David Francis (Toronto, On, Canada)
1999 : More Purple Than Black*, Phil Lewis (Los Angeles, CA, USA)
1999 : Small People, Short Story, Little Crime*, Existence (Montreal, Qc, Canada)
1999 : Wild Flowers*, Harper's March (Hollywood, CA, USA)
1999 : A Man Like That*, Dan Nash (Calgary, AB, Canada)
2000 : Little Luck, Messenger Boy (Hollywood, CA, USA)
2001 : Into a Fire, Dan Nash (Calgary, AB, Canada)
2001 : La planète humaine, Denis Schingh (Toronto, ON, Canada)
2001 : Au Yable le Brandy!*, Baqqhus (Montreal, Qc, Canada)
2002 : Obscene Cuisine*, Vaginal Croutons (Montreal, Qc, Canada)
2002 : La Samba du millénaire*, La Compagnie Créole (Paris, France)
2003 : À l’idée de m’changer, Sans Détour (Québec, Qc, Canada)
2004 : Motown, Toute une génération vol.1 (Toronto, On, Canada)
2004 : Motown, Toute une génération vol.2 (Toronto, On, Canada)
2004 : Motown, Toute une génération vol.3 (Toronto, On, Canada)
2004 : Big Star*, Patrick Marty (Montreal, Qc, Canada)
2004 : Karaoke en folie, Hommage à la Bolduc (Toronto, On, Canada)
2004 : Fitness Groove, Shadow Boxing (Toronto, On, Canada)
2004 : Fitness Groove, Step Mania (Toronto, On, Canada)
2004 : Fitness Groove, Cardio Mania (Toronto, On, Canada)

== Concert Production and Touring ==
1988 : Beatoven, David Scott, Lucio Ditoro
1997 : Beatoven, Etienne Deschenes, Natasha St-Pier
1998 : Etienne Deschenes, Messenger Boy
2000 : Jim Zeller, Les Frères à Ch’val
2001 : Steve Hill, Bob Walsh
2002 : Anthrax, Motorhead, Mötley Crüe's Vince Neil, Morbid Angel, Punk Rock Drive In (St.Albans, VT - USA), La Compagnie Créole, Super Party Rétro (Gilles Girard et les Classels, César et les Romains, Guy Harvey et les Gendarmes), Killer Dwarfs, Bald Vulture, Unfistrife, Helix
2003 : Misfits, Motorhead, Voivod, Skid Row, La Compagnie Créole, Focus, Existence, Hamadryad
2004 : Broken Pictures

== Conferences & Workshops ==
2004 : Bazar Alternatif de Montréal - SOPREF (Montreal, Qc, Canada)
2005 : Salon de la musique de Montréal (Montreal, Qc, Canada)
2006 : Salon de la musique indépendante (Québec, Qc, Canada)
2006 : Ta musique, ton milieu (Montreal, Qc, Canada)
2007 : Ta musique, ton milieu (Montreal, Qc, Canada)

== Television appearances ==
1997 : Les Amuses Gueules (Jean-Pierre Coallier) – TVA (Montreal, Qc, Canada)
1997 : La vie en Mauricie – TVA (Trois-Rivières, Qc, Canada)
1998 : Au bouts des doigts (13 episodes) – TVRN (Montreal, Qc, Canada)
1999 : Musique-o-trip – Société Radio-Canada (Natasha St-Pier) (Moncton, N.-B., Canada)

== Publications ==
2005 : Le Valseur de Bois, Lauré Lussier – Author, published by Dominique Blais (Les Éditions LittérArt)
2008 : Les métiers de l’industrie de la musique, vol.1 – Daniel Desnoyers (Muzikbiz Workshops)
2008 : Les métiers de l’industrie de la musique, vol.2 – André Ducharme (Muzikbiz Workshops)
2008 : Les métiers de l’industrie de la musique, vol.3 – Elisabetta Fantone (Muzikbiz Workshops)
