= Émily Bégin =

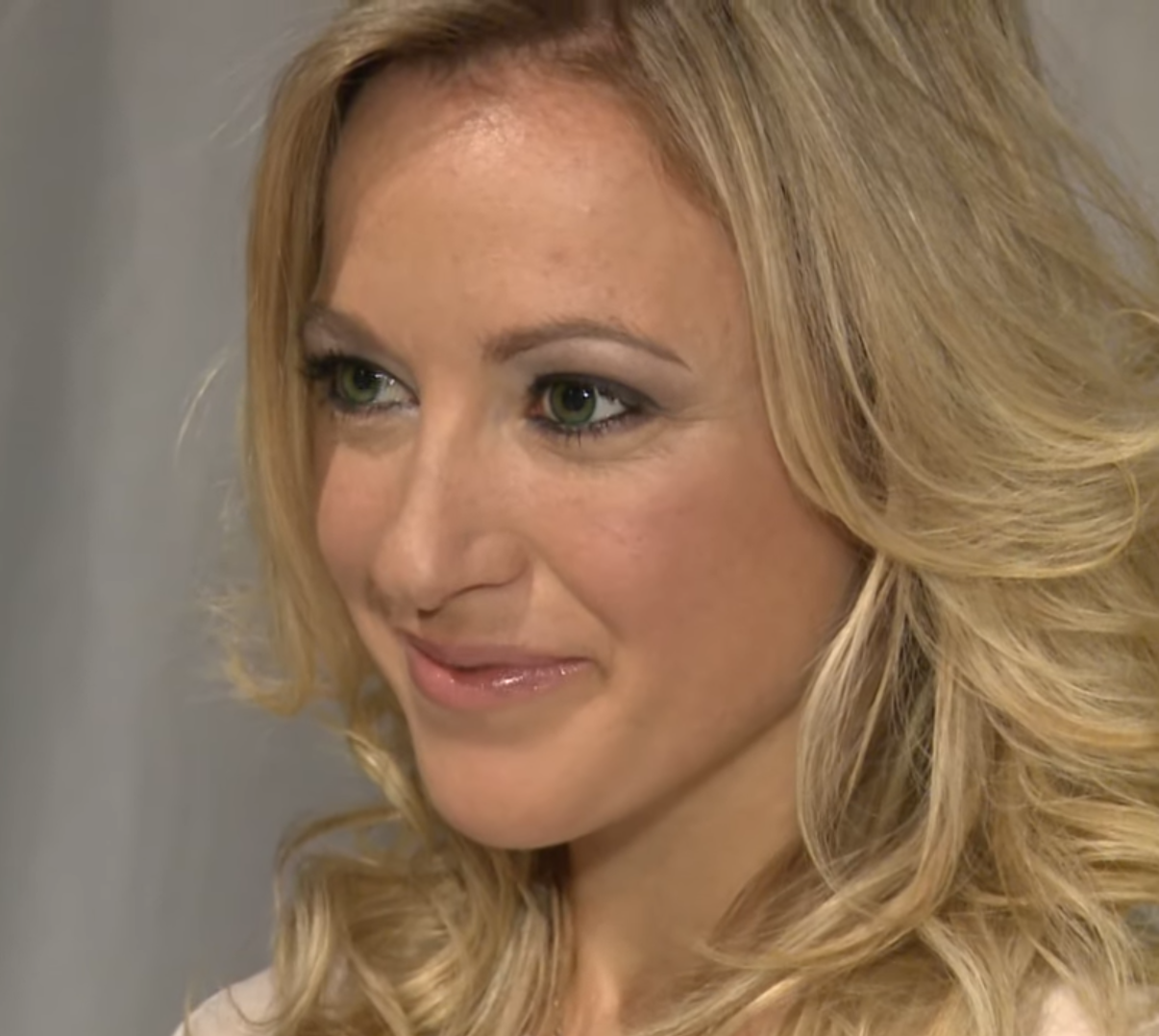
- Émily Bégin in 2013

Background information
- Born: 21 January 1982 (age 44); Saint-Jérôme, Quebec, Canada
- Genres: Dance-pop, French Pop
- Occupations: Singer, actress, dancer
- Years active: 2003–present
- Label: Distribution Select
- Website: www.emilybegin.ca

Émily Bégin (born 21 January 1982) is a Canadian singer, actress and dancer. She is known for her participation in the first season of Star Académie. Shortly after she released her debut album. She received a degree in dance from Cégep Montmorency, in musical theater Lionel Groulx College and several workshops at the school Fichaud Danielle. Her debut album Légende Urbaine was released in 2005, followed by her self-titled second album in 2007.

== Star Academie ==
Bégin was a contestant in the first season of Star Académie. Bégin traveled Quebec in 2003 with the grand tour Star Academie. Émily has said

"You know, I think it will follow me my whole life, and rightly so," she says. But people recognize name in the street as Emily of Star Academy. They saw me in New in Cabaret, they listened to my songs ... they now recognize the artist Emily "

== Stage ==
In 2004, Bégin took part in more than 100 performances of Cabaret playing the role of Frenchy and continued on the traveling tour of Quebec in 2005. In 2008 Emily played Helena in the musical Sweet Charity. In early 2007 Emily played the role of Carla in the musical NINE. In 2009 Emily played Chava in the musical Fiddler on the Roof and will take part in the traveling tour in the summer of 2010. Emily has worked on several projects with director Denise Filiatrault.

== Music ==
=== Légende Urbaine (2004) ===
Émily's debut album Légende Urbaine was released in November 2005 with an urban style dance hall vibe. Singles from the album included "Légende Urbaine" and "Mata Hari". "Légende Urbaine" stayed steady in the Top 10 Network Power for six weeks. Music videos for the songs were in heavy rotation for an extended period of time. Another massive hit from the album was the song 'Ou Sont les Femmes.'

=== Émily (2007) ===
Émily took to her self-titled second album becoming involved in the style and writing some songs. The result is a disc a bit more daring, resolutely focused on the textures of the 1980s. The first single from the album was 'Laissez-moi danser' originally performed by Dalida. Émily recalls her mother listening to the song when cleaning with her mother on the weekends. The song was the first to become a video from the album. The second radio single for 'Émily was' Adrénaline.' The third single, and second video for the album was for the song 'Au Grand Jour' which made a splash due to its provocative nature regarding sexuality of those of the same sex.
