= Zébulon (band) =

Music group from Quebec, Canada

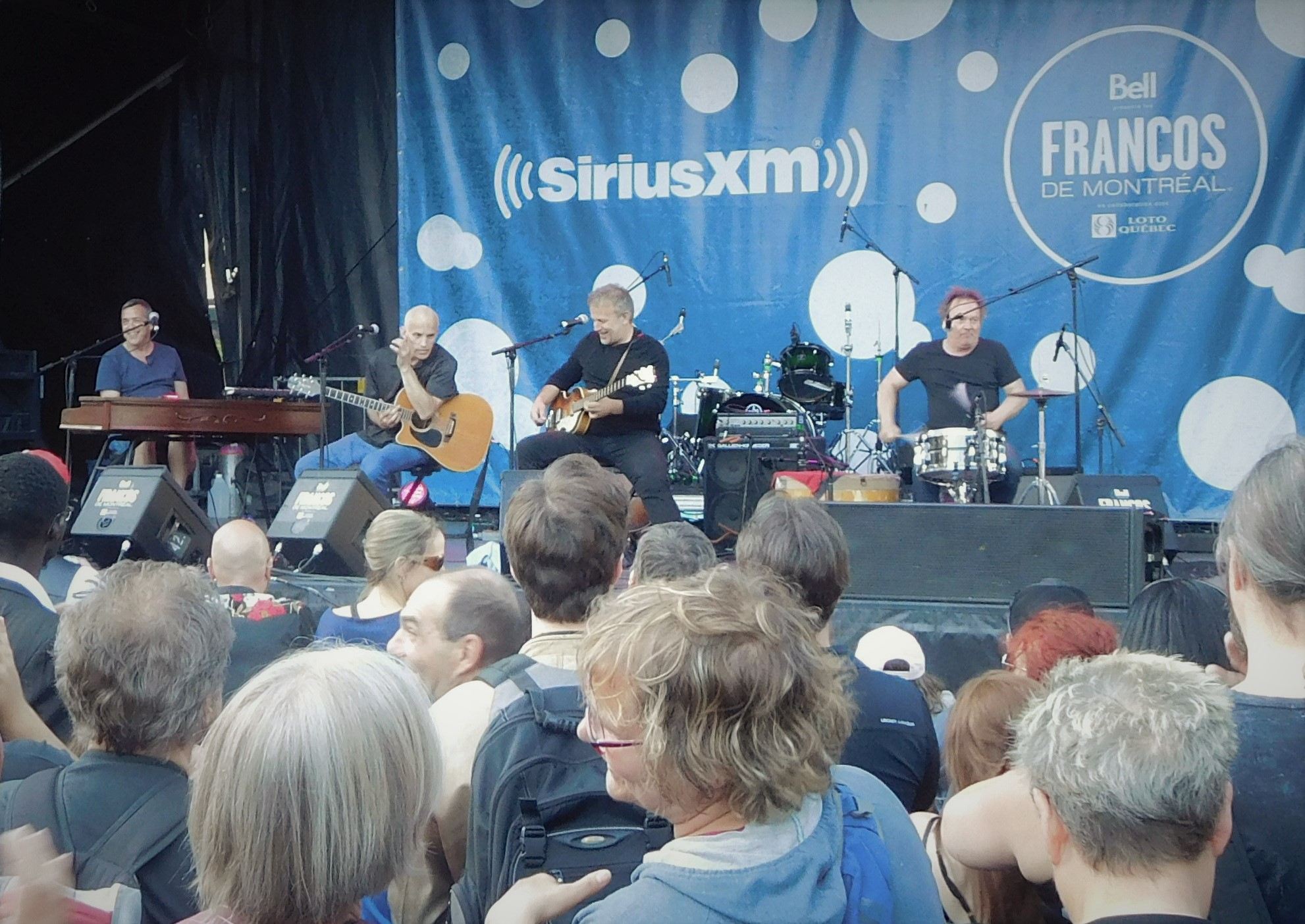
Les FrancoFolies de Montréal, 2018

Zébulon is a Canadian music group based in Montreal, Quebec. They released three albums and several singles between 1994 and 2008.

== History ==
Zébulon was formed in 1993 in Montreal by singer-bassist Marc Déry, guitarist Yves Déry, keyboardist Yves Marchand and drummer Alain Quirion. Marc and Yves are brothers.

The band released its first self-titled album in 1994. Their song "Job Steady" received radio play, and they also release singles "Les femmes préfèrent les Ginos" and "Adrénaline". In 1997, they won group of the year honours at Quebec's Felix Awards.

After 1997, the band became inactive, but the original members got back together to record an album, Retour sur Mars, in 2008. They then toured in support of the album.

== Band members ==
- Marc Déry (vocals, bass, guitar)
- Yves Déry (vocals, guitar)
- Yves Marchand (vocals, piano, organ, synthesiser)
- Alain Quirion (vocals, drums/percussion)
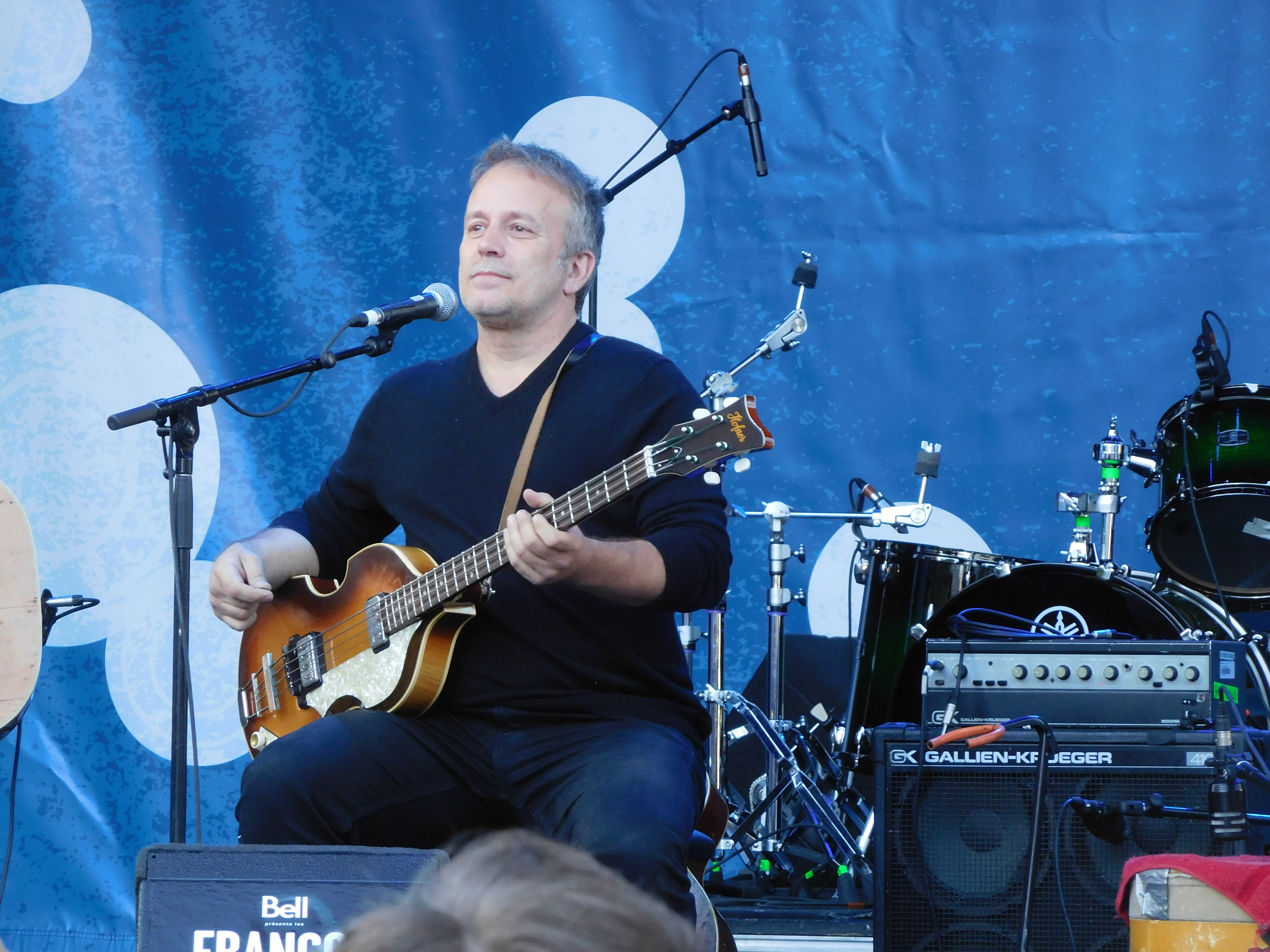
Marc Déry

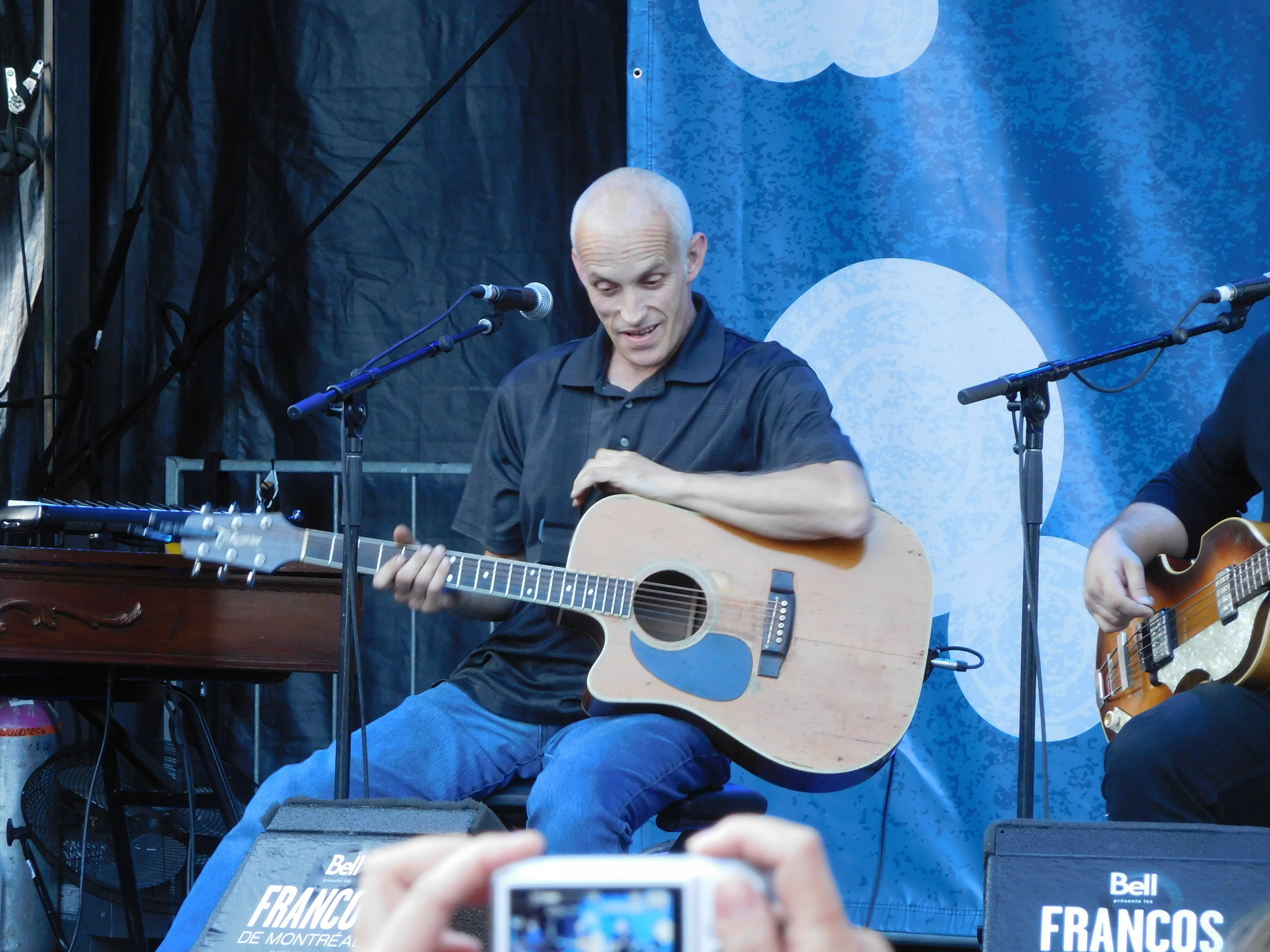
Yves Déry

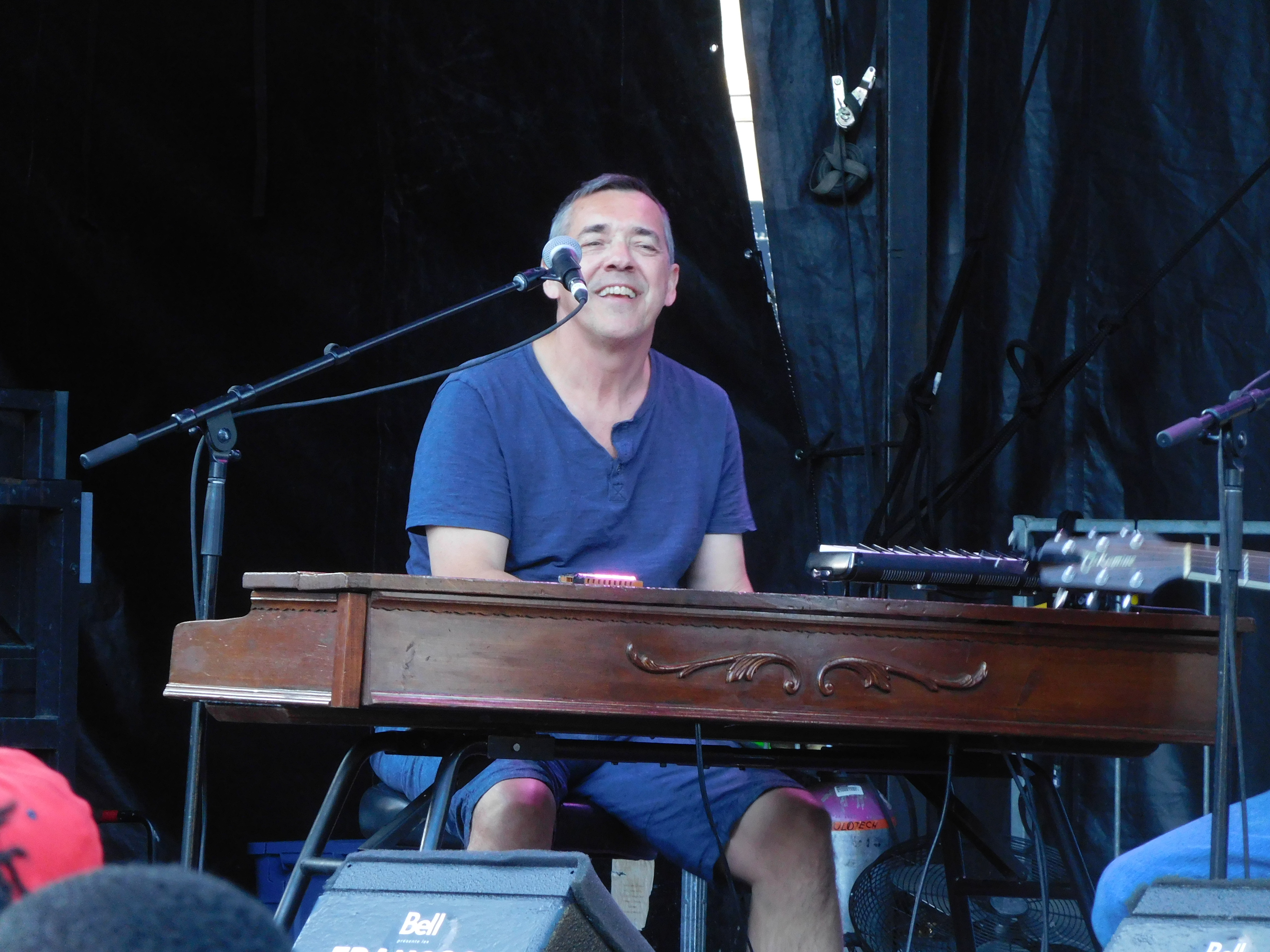
Yves Marchand

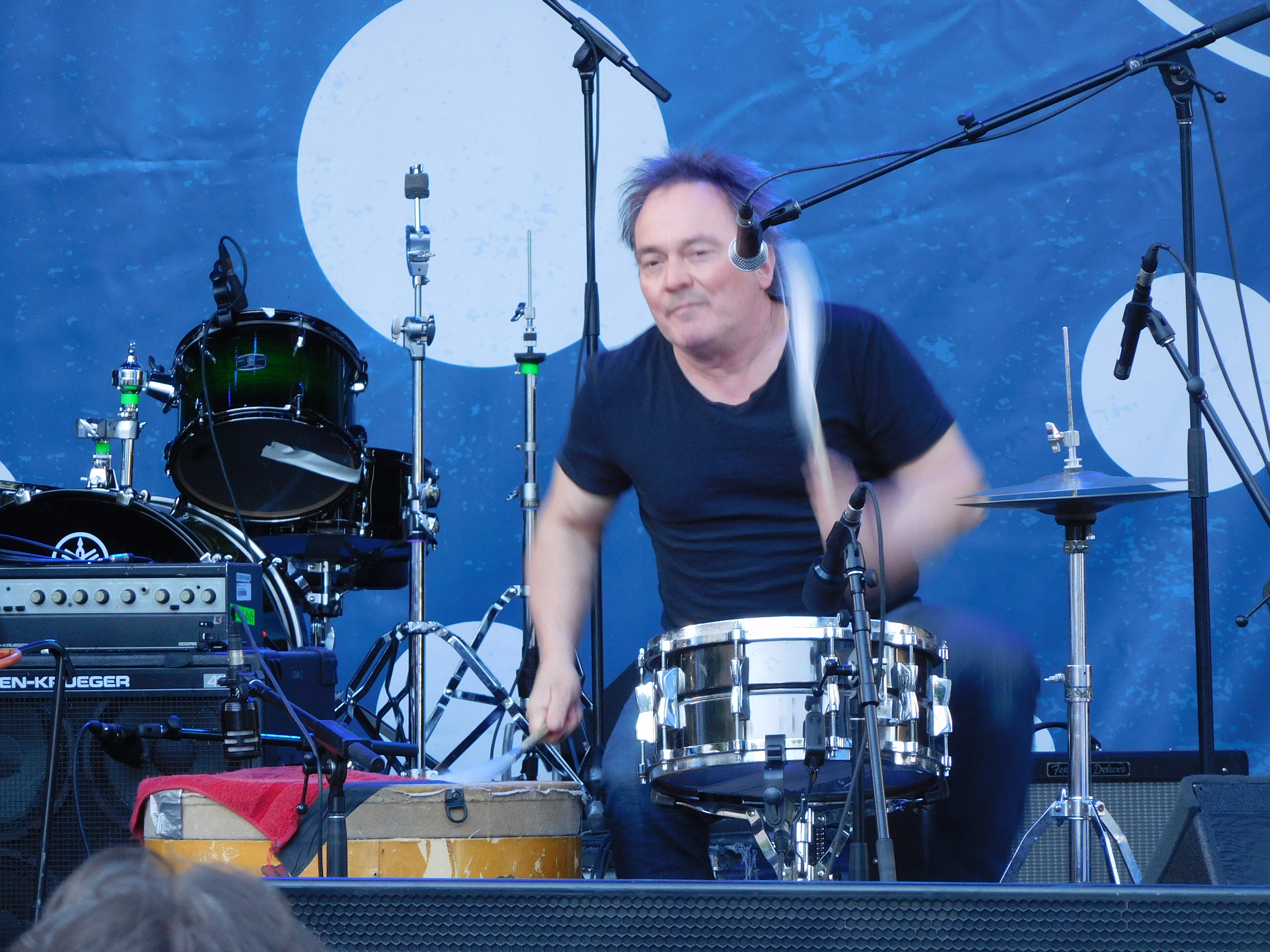
Alain Quirion

== Discography ==
- 1994: Zébulon
- 1996: L'Oeil du Zig
- 2008: Retour sur Mars
