= Paul Cargnello =

Canadian musical artist

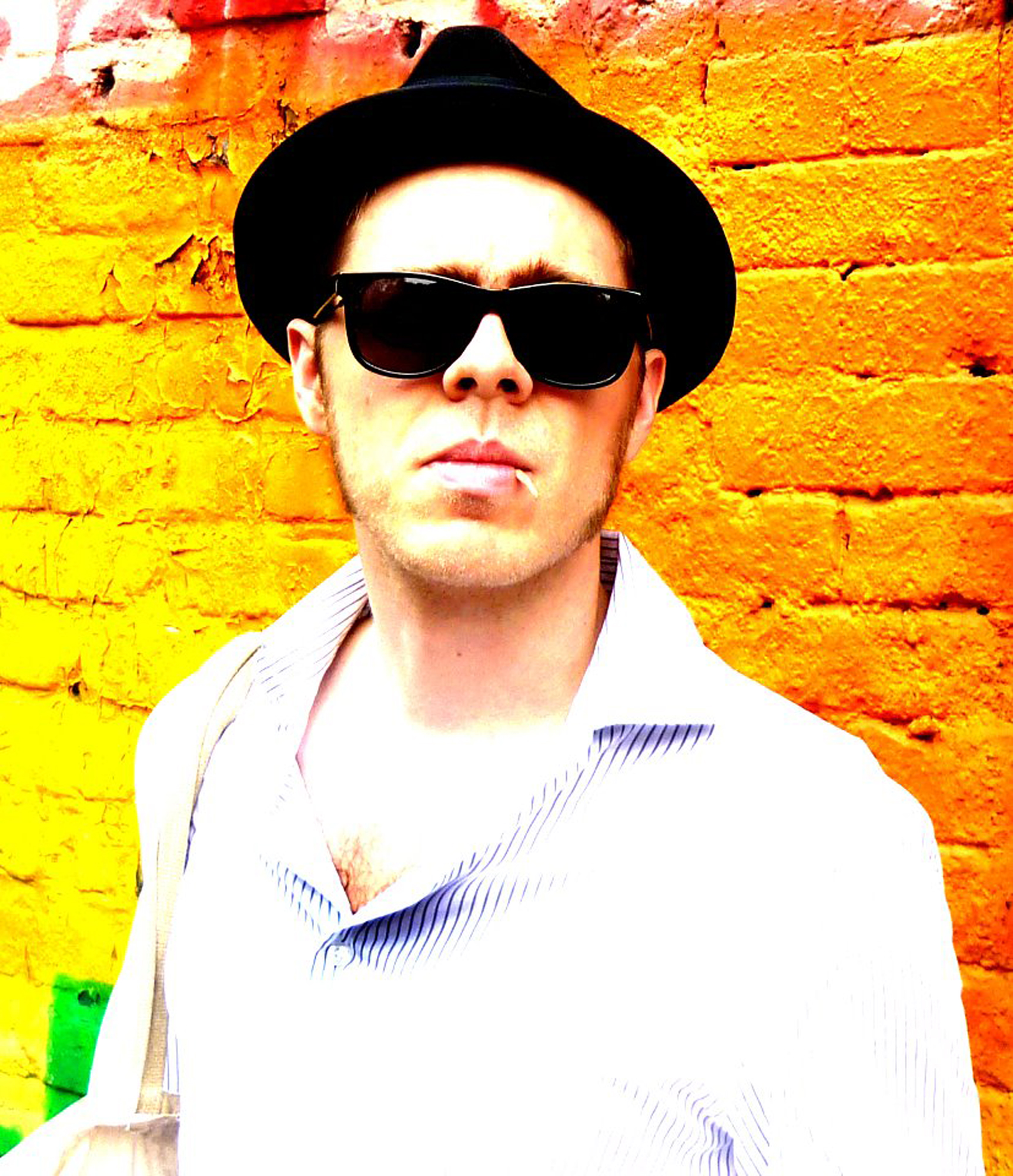
- Cargnello in 2012

Background information
- Origin: Montreal, Quebec, Canada
- Genres: blues-rock reggae folk rock punk rock
- Occupations: singer-songwriter, producer, poet
- Instruments: vocals, guitar, harmonica, percussion, bass guitar, drums, melodica, keyboard
- Years active: 1994–present
- Label: Quartier Général
- Website: paulcargnello.com

Paul Cargnello is a Canadian singer-songwriter, producer, and poet from Montreal. Although anglophone, he has had his greatest success as a writer and singer of French language songs.

== Background ==
Cargnello was born in Montreal to an Argentine immigrant father of Italian descent and a Canadian mother of Lithuanian heritage.

== Musical career ==
Cargnello was originally associated with the punk rock band The Vendettas, which recorded two EPs in the late 1990s before releasing the full-length album It's Happening to You! in 2000. Cargnello then released his first solo album Lightweight Romeo in 2002. In 2004 he released his second album Between Evils, and the Vendettas reunited for their second and final album, Say No to the Vendettas. In 2005, he performed a live show at Montreal's Le Va-et-vient live music club, which was released as the album Live au Va-et-vient.

In 2006, he undertook his first major concert tour of English Canada.

In 2007, he released his first French-language album, Brûler le jour. Although fluently bilingual as a speaker he was not experienced in French songwriting, so the album also marked his first time collaborating with other songwriters, including Jim Corcoran, Vincent Vallières, Ève Cournoyer and Fred Fortin. The album's lead single, "Une rose noire", became his first charting hit on Canada's francophone pop charts, reaching number 12 in the Quebec charts in 2007. Later that year, he was a finalist for Prix Félix-Leclerc de la chanson.

The following year he released Bragging, a tribute album to Billy Bragg.

His second French-language album, Bras coupé, was released in 2009. He was a shortlisted nominee for the 2009 Echo Songwriting Prize in the francophone category for the album's title track, and for Francophone Songwriter of the Year at the 5th Canadian Folk Music Awards. He followed up in 2010 with the album La Course des loups and the limited edition EP La Reine contre Paul Cargnello, and in 2012 with the album Papa Paul. Papa Paul also included two songs in Haitian Creole, and included his second charting hit "L'effet que tu me fais".

He released his 10th studio album The Hardest Part Is You May Never Know with Union Label Group in 2014. It was his first primarily English-language album since Bragging, although it still featured two songs in French.

In April 2017, Cargnello released a kids' album for parents "tired of the schlock that the music industry throws at our children." The album, titled Something Dimferent featured vocals by both Cargnello and his son Declan, and was released online only, including a full-length animated video available on YouTube.

In December 2017, a new album was released featuring the music of Cargnello and the lyrics of street poet Siou Deslongchamps, entitled Intense Cité. It was released in collaboration with the magazine L'Itinéraire. Profits from the album have gone towards the fight against poverty in Montreal.

MTL RnB is a bilingual musical project conceived by Cargnello, released digitally in May 2018. This album features his compositions and collaborations with singers and musicians from Montreal.

In February 2019, Cargnello released the first single from his upcoming album, Promises. The video, directed by Nik Brovkin, features dancer Toshiro Kamara, and was launched on the website Cult MTL.

In 2020 Cargnello produced and co-composed Jonathan Emile's album Spaces-in-Between for Tuff Gong including the single "Babylon Is Falling" featuring Maxi Priest.

Cargnello released two albums in 2021, Peut-être in French, and Lies in English. Music journalist T'Cha Dunlevy of the Montreal Gazette wrote "Cargnello hasn’t lost his edge — he has simply refined it."

In August 2023, Cargnello collaborated with DJ Horg on the album This is a Change. The album marked a fusion of genres, with Cargnello singing, rapping, and playing guitar, while DJ Horg created boom-bap rhythms and scratches. Philippe Renaud from Le Devoir gave the album three and a half stars out of five, praising its engaged themes, inspired bass lines, and relevant musical energy, noting its success in this innovative musical exploration. Renaud also pointed out that the album deliberately stands out from contemporary trends, making it a bold artistic experience.

== Skinny Bros ==
Paul Cargnello teamed up with his brother Christopher in 2012 and started a side project called Skinny Bros, together they released several EPs and four full-length albums: Fat Tunes (2012), Countréal (2014), Party Gras (2016), The Beginning & The End (2020). These albums feature many musical guests including Danish harmonica legend Lee Oskar, American rapper KRS-One, Lithuanian rock legend Andrius Mamontovas, & Canadian Polaris Music Prize winner Backxwash.

== Other ==
In addition to his music, Cargnello has published two collections of poetry, Driving in Reverse (1997) and Old Hat (2002).

In 2013 he won the City of Montreal's Outstanding Citizen Award for his work as co-founder and chief organizer of NDG Arts Week in the borough of Notre-Dame-de-Grâce.

In 2014, he appeared on Le Combat des livres as the advocate for Marie-Claire Blais' novel La Belle Bête. The novel won the competition.

Cargnello opened Upper China recording studio in late 2016 and added the title of producer to his list of musical credits.

In 2018 he founded the concert series MTL vs RACISME in response to the rise of the far-right, and to fight racial discrimination in Montreal. The 2020 online edition featured the reunion of Me Mom and Morgentaler covering The Specials song "Racist Friend".

Cargnello identifies his politics as socialist. He was also a spokesman for Sac à dos, an anti-poverty organization in Montreal.

== Discography ==
- Lightweight Romeo (2002)
- Between Evils (2004)
- Paul Cargnello & the Frontline Live au Va-et-vient (2005)
- Brûler le jour (2007)
- Bragging (2008)
- Bras coupé (2009)
- La Course des loups (2010)
- La Reine contre Paul Cargnello (2010)
- Papa Paul (2012)
- The Hardest Part Is You May Never Know (2014)
- Something Dimferent (2017)
- Intense Cité (2017)
- MTL RNB (2018)
- PROMISES (2019)
- The Exception (2020)
- Stripped Down (2020)
- Peut-être (2021)
- Lies (2021)
- History from Below (2022)
- Paul Cargnello & the Truth Live au QG (2023)
- This is a Change (2023) collaboration with DJ Horg
- Sad Little Songs (2024)
- Blues de combat EP (2025)
- Combat Blues (2025)
- Combat RMXs (2026)
