= Zekuhl =

- Born: Atna Jean Emmanuel Njock; Montreal, Quebec, Canada
- Genres: World music
- Years active: 1991–present
- Website: zekuhl.com

Atna Jean Emmanuel (Manu) Njock, aka Zekuhl, is a singer, guitarist, percussionist and a songwriter of world music. He presents a Bolbo-Jazz style. He sings in Bàsàa (a Cameroon language), French and English.

== Early life ==
Njock was born in Quebec City and raised in Cameroon. His initiation to Cameroonian and Bantu musical traditions, as well as those of the Baka Pygmies who lived near his village of Kaya, began at age four. He studied many Cameroonian musical styles, including the Assiko, the Bolbo, the Bikutsi, the Ndin, the Mangambeu, the Bol, the Makossa, the Mbalè, the Mpeya of the Baka Pygmies. He also learned to play the Nkuu (a wooden, cylinder-shaped drum with hollowed-out slits) also known as the African telephone, since it reproduces the sound of spoken language.

== Career ==
Njock arrived in Montreal, Quebec, Canada, in 1991. Joining the Quebec music scene as Zekuhl, he at first played the guitar, and later developed a style which included his diverse African influences. In 1992, he released a self-titled album. He performed at a number of cultural and music festivals in Quebec.

Zekuhl's third album, I Bolo, released in 2011, combined jazz funk guitar and bantu rhythms; eight years later he released Tòòdana ("Awake"), with lyrics in the Baasa language.

== Discography ==
- 1992: Zekuhl
- 1997: Amon
- 2011: I Bolo

== Awards ==
- 2011: nominated for Canadian Folk Music Awards «World Solo Artist of the Year»
- 2010: Jean Bikoko Aladin Award (delivered by Cameroonian community figures in Canada)
- 1991: nominated L'Empire des futures stars
