= El Motor =

French-Canadian indie-rock band

- Origin: Montreal, Quebec, Canada
- Genres: indie-rock
- Years active: 2007–present
- Labels: Véga Musique
- Members: Frédéric Boivin; Pierre Alexandre Bouchard; Guillaume Devin-Duclos; Alexis Dufresne; Pascal Gingras
- Website: http://www.elmotor.ca/

El Motor is a French-Canadian indie-rock band formed in Montreal, Quebec, Canada in 2007. They are signed to Véga Musique.

== History ==
El Motor was formed in 2007 with members from the defunct pop-rock group Trémolo, which had disbanded after releasing two albums in 1999 and 2002.

In 2007, El Motor released a self-titled album which was nominated for two ADISQ awards. Shortly thereafter, the band's producer and manager died; the band's recording plans were shelved for a number of years. In 2009, the band toured in Quebec with singer Louise Forestier, Dufresne's mother.

In 2013, El Motor reformed and released another album, Le Monstre. The album was showcased at the Festival de musique émergente in Abitibi.

== Members ==
=== Current ===
- Pierre Alexandre Bouchard, vocals/guitar (2007–present)
- Frédéric Boivin, guitar/keyboard (2007–present)
- Alexis Dufresne, guitar/keyboard/programmer (2007–present)
- Guillaume Devin-Duclos, bass (2007–present)
- Pascal Gingras, drums (2007–present)

== See also ==
- Music of Canada
- Music of Quebec
- Canadian rock
- List of Canadian musicians
- List of bands from Canada
- Category:Canadian musical groups
