= Marc Déry =

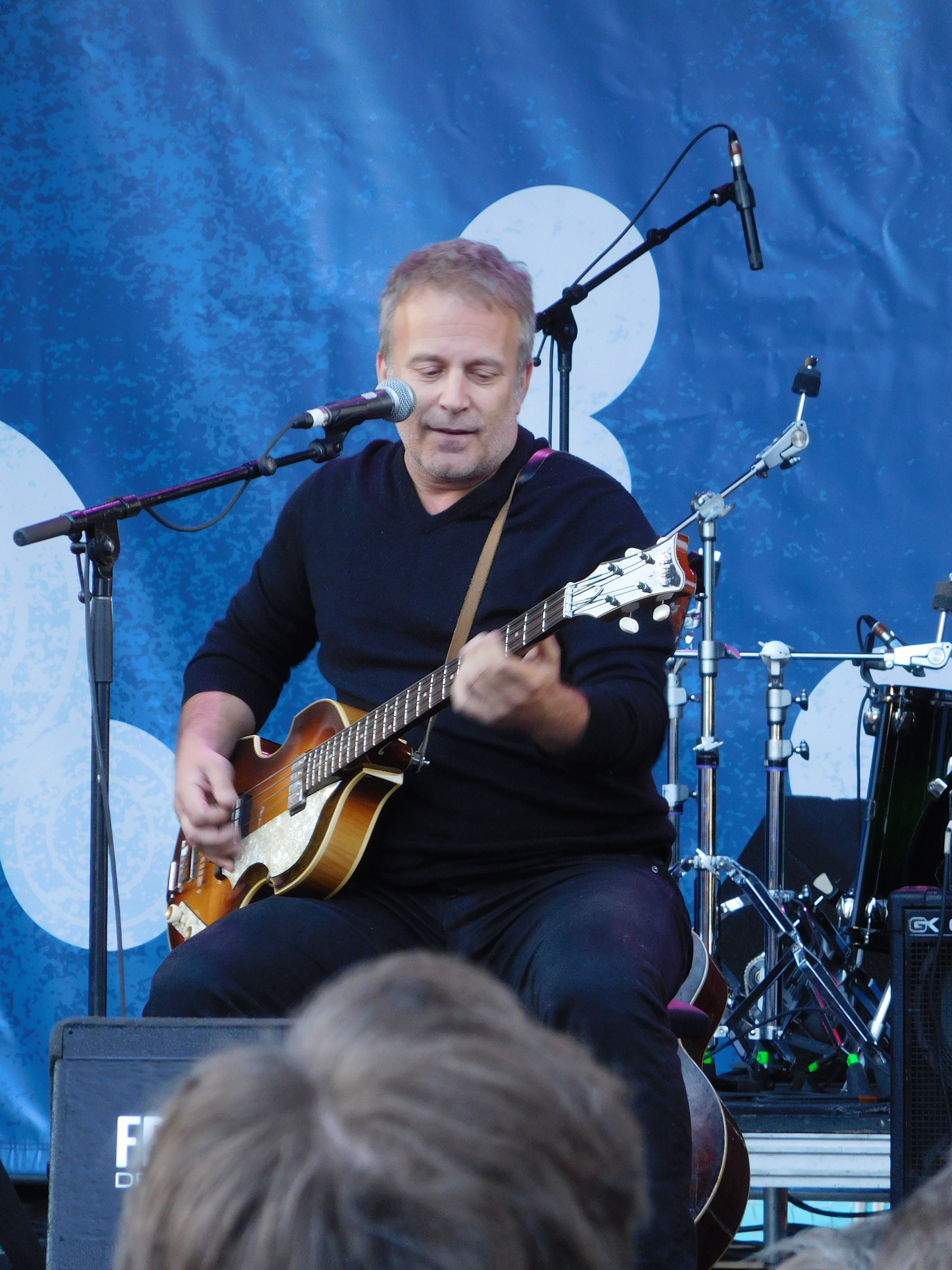
- Zebulon - Montreal 2018-06-09

Background information
- Born: 4 November 1963 (age 62); Mascouche, Quebec
- Years active: 1993–present
- Website: marcdery.ca

Marc Déry (born 4 November 1963) a French Canadian singer and guitarist from Quebec. He was a member of the band Zébulon. and also released four albums as a solo artist.

== Early life ==
Déry was born in Mascouche, Quebec.

== Career ==
Déry played bass for the band Les Colocs. In 1993, with his brother Yves, as well as Yves Marchand and Alain Quirion, he formed the band Zébulon. The group performed, recorded and toured until 1997.

In 1998, Déry began a solo career; his first solo album won him a Félix Award for arranger of the year. He then released two more solo albums before getting back together with his Zébulon bandmates to produce an album and conduct a follow-up tour in 2008.

Déry's fourth solo album, Numéro 4 was released in 2011 and was more pop-oriented than the others. He has toured extensively in Quebec.

== Discography ==
- Marc Déry (1999)
- À l'avenir (2002)
- À la figure (2005)
- Numéro 4 (2011)
- Atterrissage (2019)

== Videos ==
- Le monde est rendu peace (1999)
- La cabane à Félix (2000)
- Ostie qu'y se lève tard (2003)
- À la figure (2005)
- 20$ (2006)
