= Boyce, Chattanooga =

Coordinates: 35.0770°N 85.2572°W

Boyce is an area within Chattanooga, Tennessee.

== History ==
A post office called Boyce was established in 1880, and remained in operation until it was discontinued in 1889. The community was named for Samuel J. Boyce, son of Chattanooga city father Ker Boyce, a native of South Carolina.
