= Daniel Boucher (musician) =

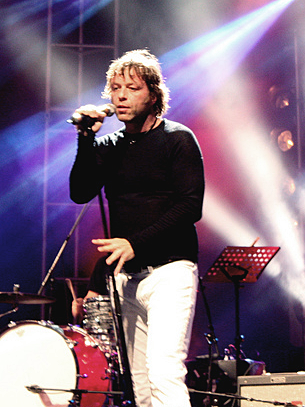
- Boucher at the Festiblues of Montréal

Background information
- Born: October 7, 1971 (age 54); Montreal, Quebec, Canada
- Occupations: Musician, Actor
- Instrument: Vocals
- Website: www.boucanebleue.com

Daniel Boucher (born October 7, 1971) is a Québécois musician.

Born in Montreal, he has released three studio albums; Dix Mille Matins on October 12, 1999, La patente on February 24, 2004, and Le soleil est sorti on November 11, 2008. From his own saying, "Le soleil est sorti" is his favourite of them.

In 2006, he portrayed Renfield in the Québec production of Dracula - Entre l'amour et la mort.

== Discography ==
- 1999: Dix Mille Matins
- 2004: La Patente
- 2007: La Patente / Live
- 2007: Chansonnier / Live
- 2008: Le Soleil est sorti
- 2014: Toutte est temporaire

== Personal life ==
As of 2021, Boucher was living in Saint-Maxime-du-Mont-Louis, Quebec.
