= La Volée d'Castors =

Canadian music group

- Origin: Lanaudière, Quebec Canada
- Genres: Folk
- Years active: 1993–present
- Members: Frédéric Beauséjour; Frédéric Bourgeois; André Dupuis; Mathieu Lacas; Sébastien Parent
- Past members: Martin Mailhot; Nicolas Froment; Steve Boulay; Réjean Brunet
- Website: www.vdc.qc.ca

La Volée d'Castors (A Flock of Beavers) is a Canadian folk music group formed in 1993. Since the late 1990s, they performed in Quebec and have toured 15 countries.

== History ==
The band from the Lanaudière region was formed in 1993 by Nicolas Froment, Mathieu Lacas, Martin Mailhot, and Sébastien Parent. Their first album, Galant, was released in 1994.

In 1995, they were joined by Frédéric Bourgeois from Sainte-Marie-Salomé, and for the first time they performed outside the province of Quebec, at the Northern Lights Festival Boréal in Sudbury, Ontario. Réjean Brunet was added to the lineup in 1996, and for a year the Castors were the official musicians of a traditional Lanaudière dance ensemble, les Petits Pas Jacadiens. They also performed occasional concerts in and around Montreal and Quebec City.

1997 marked a turning point for the band when they produced themselves at a world folk festival in Saint-Malo, France, in their first international performance. In 1998, their second album, Par monts et par vaux, was launched, and the Castors were invited to various radio and televised live performances which helped increase their popularity. They played in the United States for the first time in 1999 at the New World Music Festival, in Vermont, and at the same time they produced a video for Belle embarquez!.

The new millennium saw them performing concerts across Canada and in the United States, notably at the North American Folk Music and Dance Alliance in Cleveland, Ohio. Their third album, VDC, recorded in Saint-Calixte, was released the same year and earned the group a nomination at the 2001 Juno Awards in the Best Roots and traditional album-group.

In 2001, they went on a tour that took them across Canada and Europe. They collected a Félix at the ADISQ awards for the best traditional album. The following year, original member Nicolas Froment left the band, to be replaced by Steve Boulay from Gaspésie. Again the band embarked on a European tour, in which they took part at the Hebridean Celtic Festival in Scotland and the Tonder Folk Festival in Denmark. Back in Quebec they also performed live with La Bottine Souriante and toured across the province.

In 2003, their fourth album, Migration, was released and the band toured North America, Europe, and for the first time, played in Japan, Malaysia, at the Rainforest World Music Festival, Australia, at the WOMADelaide, and New Zealand. The New Orleans Jazz and Heritage Festival and the Vancouver Folk Festival also welcomed the Castors, who were joined that year by André Dupuis, a percussionist experienced in Cuban and Latin music.

Since 2004, the band has taken care of itself independently, and has continued to perform concerts in Europe and North America. In 2005, their first live album, Y'a du monde à messe, was released. A new member, Frédéric Beauséjour, was welcomed the same year.

== Members ==
- Frédéric Beauséjour 2005–
- Frédéric Bourgeois (Accordion, feet, harmonica, voice) 1995–
- André Dupuis (Percussions) 2003–
- Mathieu Lacas (Violin) 1993–
- Sébastien Parent (Guitars, banjo, voice) 1993–

=== Former members ===
- Martin Mailhot 1993–2006
- Nicolas Froment 1993–2001
- Steve Boulay 2001–2005
- Réjean Brunet 1996–2006

== Discography ==
- 1994: Galant
- 1998: Par monts et par vaux
- 2000: VDC
- 2003: Migration
- 2005: Y'a du monde à messe
- 2006: L'album du temps des fêtes
- 2010: Le retour
