= Anodajay =

- Born: Stephen Jolin; July 7, 1977 (age 48); Rouyn-Noranda, Quebec, Canada
- Genres: Hip hop
- Occupations: Rapper, singer
- Years active: 2001 – present
- Label: 7ième Ciel
- Website: www.anodajay.com

Stephen Jolin, better known as Anodajay, is a rapper from Rouyn-Noranda, Quebec in Canada. He is best known for his cover of the Quebec classic renamed Le beat à Ti-bi, in duet with Raôul Duguay.

== Biography ==
Anodajay first encountered hip hop at the age of twelve, and from the age of sixteen became more involved in it, along with his other main interest basketball. He worked as a physical education teacher at D'Iberville school for several years before pursuing music as a full-time career. He released his first album Premier VII in 2003, but success came in 2006 with his second album Septentrion, which contained a cover of the Quebec classic renamed Le beat à Ti-bi, in duet with Raôul Duguay. His third album ET7ERA, was released in 2010.

== Personal life ==
He resides in Abitibi, Quebec.

== Discography ==
=== Albums ===
- 2003: Premier VII
- 2006: Septentrion
- 2010: ET7ERA

=== EPs ===
- 2005: Le 7 secondes...

=== Singles ===
- 2011: "Jamais su"
- 2011: "Mon neighborwood"

=== As Executive Producer ===
| Year | Album | Artist | Music Label |
|---|---|---|---|
| 2007 | Face à soi-même | Samian | Disques 7ième Ciel |
| 2008 | Racines dans le béton | Koriass | Disques 7ième Ciel |
| 2009 | Boîte noire | Dramatik | Disques 7ième Ciel |
| 2010 | Face à la musique | Samian | Disques 7ième Ciel |
| 2011 | Petites victoires | Koriass | Disques 7ième Ciel |
| 2012 | Marée humaine | Manu Militari | Disques 7ième Ciel |
| 2013 | Rue des Saules | Koriass | Disques 7ième Ciel |
| 2014 | Radiothérapie | Dramatik | Disques 7ième Ciel |
| 2014 | Enfants de la terre | Samian | Disques 7ième Ciel |
| 2014 | XXL | Eman X Vlooper | Disques 7ième Ciel |
| 2015 | Océan | Manu Militari | Disques 7ième Ciel |
| 2015 | Petit Love | Koriass | Disques 7ième Ciel |
| 2016 | Brown | Brown | Disques 7ième Ciel |
| 2016 | Love Suprême | Koriass | Disques 7ième Ciel |
| 2016 | Les Frères Cueilleurs | Alaclair Ensemble | Disques 7ième Ciel |
| 2016 | Long Jeu | KNLO | Disques 7ième Ciel |
