= Projet Orange =

- Origin: Quebec City, Quebec, Canada
- Genres: Alternative rock, britpop
- Years active: 2000–2007
- Labels: ViK. Recordings, Sony BMG
- Past members: Jean-Christophe Boies; Jean-Sébastien Boies; Louis "Luis" Lalancette; Stéphane Gaudreau; Guillaume Doiron

Projet Orange was a Quebecois musical band from Quebec City, Quebec. They performed britpop-inspired rock.

== Profile ==
Formed in Quebec City by brothers Jean-Christophe and Jean-Sébastien Boies, Projet Orange played a britpop-like, catchy and flowing sound. Their success began when they won the Quebec musical contest L'Empire des futures stars.

The name came from an early show of multiple groups in which the band was partook. It was required to enter the name of one's band on a sheet, where the names of the bands would be preceded by "Projet:" (Project:). After seeing the orange coat of a fellow member, one band player entered "Orange" next to the term and thus the name was born.

In 2002, member Jean-Sébastien developed a blood disease, forcing the band to take a half-year hiatus and halt songwriting. The first album being entirely francophone, the second, in order to introduce the band to the English-speaking world (especially Canada), includes eleven pieces in English out of fifteen. It was created with the aid of singer-songwriter Simon Wilcox and producer Gavin Brown. The album is partly inspired by Jean-Sébastien's ordeal, as well as the September 11 attacks.

In 2004, the band released the album Megaphobe. The album's lead single, "Tell All Your Friends", reached No. 8 on Canada's Rock chart.

The band made its last appearance on stage at the Zaphod Beeblebrox in Ottawa, 8 March 2007. Jean-Christophe said "This is our last show ever". They played a few new songs, as well as some songs out of the second album. Their very last live song was "Jamais de mal". Despite an article published in Le Droit on 8 March, mentioning a third album is ready to go, lead singer Jean-Christophe said about one of the new song "This is a new song, well, this is as far as this song will go". Jean-Sébastien was absent on the stage.

Lead Singer Jean-Christophe is rumoured to have left the band to work on a new project "Buro 40".

== Members ==
- Jean-Christophe Boies (rhythm guitar, lead vocals)
- Jean-Sébastien Boies (rhythm guitar, piano, backing vocals)
- Louis "Luis" Lalancette (bass guitar, backing vocals)
- Stéphane Gaudreau (drums)
- Guillaume Doiron (lead guitar)

== Discography ==
=== Studio albums ===
- Projet Orange (21 July 2001)
- Megaphobe (12 October 2004)

=== Singles ===
| Year | Title | Peak chart positions | Album |
| Year | Title | CAN Rock | Album |
|---|---|---|---|
| 2000 | "S'etend L'amer" | × | Projet Orange |
| 2000 | "La Pomme" | × | Projet Orange |
| 2000 | "Mystères Aérosol" | × | Projet Orange |
| 2004 | "Tell All Your Friends" | 8 | Megaphobe |
"—" denotes releases that did not chart. "×" denotes periods where charts did not exist or were not archived.

== See also ==
- List of Quebec musicians
- Music of Quebec
- Culture of Quebec
- Britpop
