= List of number-one albums of 2015 (Canada) =

These are the Canadian number-one albums of 2015. The chart is compiled by Nielsen Soundscan and published by Jam! Canoe, issued every Sunday. The chart also appears in Billboard magazine as Top Canadian Albums.

Note that Billboard publishes charts with an issue date approximately 7–10 days in advance.

== Number-one albums ==
Key
†	Indicates best-performing album of 2015

Issue date	Album	Artist(s)	Ref.
January 3	1989 †	Taylor Swift	
January 10	1989 †	Taylor Swift	
January 17	1989 †	Taylor Swift	
January 24	1989 †	Taylor Swift	
January 31	Title	Meghan Trainor	
February 7	American Beauty/American Psycho	Fall Out Boy	
February 14	1989 †	Taylor Swift	
February 21	À Paradis City	Jean Leloup	
February 28	If You're Reading This It's Too Late	Drake	
March 7	Smoke + Mirrors	Imagine Dragons	
March 14	Fifty Shades of Grey	Soundtrack	
March 21	Fifty Shades of Grey	Soundtrack	
March 28	Rebel Heart	Madonna	
April 4	To Pimp a Butterfly	Kendrick Lamar	
April 11	Yoan	Yoan	
April 18	Yoan	Yoan	
April 25	Yoan	Yoan	
May 2	Handwritten	Shawn Mendes	
May 9	Sound & Color	Alabama Shakes	
May 16	Jekyll + Hyde	Zac Brown Band	
May 23	Wilder Mind	Mumford & Sons	
May 30	La Voix III	Soundtrack	
June 6	La Voix III	Soundtrack	
June 13	At. Long. Last. ASAP	ASAP Rocky	
June 20	How Big, How Blue, How Beautiful	Florence and the Machine	
June 27	Beneath the Skin	Of Monsters and Men	
July 4	x	Ed Sheeran	
July 11	Dark Before Dawn	Breaking Benjamin	
July 18	Dreams Worth More Than Money	Meek Mill	
July 25	Dreams Worth More Than Money	Meek Mill	
August 1	Just The Hits 2015	Various artists	
August 8	Just The Hits 2015	Various artists	
August 15	VII: Sturm und Drang	Lamb of God	
August 22	1989 †	Taylor Swift	
August 29	Compton	Dr. Dre	
September 5	Kill the Lights	Luke Bryan	
September 12	Immortalized	Disturbed	
September 19	Beauty Behind the Madness	The Weeknd	
September 26	Beauty Behind the Madness	The Weeknd	
October 3	That's the Spirit	Bring Me the Horizon	
October 10	What a Time to Be Alive	Drake and Future	
October 17	Sorel Soviet So What	Bernard Adamus	
October 24	Unbreakable	Janet Jackson	
October 31	If I Should Go Before You	City and Colour	
November 7	Confident	Demi Lovato	
November 14	Sounds Good Feels Good	5 Seconds of Summer	
November 21	Beauty Behind the Madness	The Weeknd	
November 28	Hello	Hedley	
December 5	Purpose	Justin Bieber	
December 12	25	Adele	
December 19	25	Adele	
December 26	25	Adele	

== See also ==
- List of Canadian Hot 100 number-one singles of 2015
