= La Voix season 2 =

2014 season of French-Canadian reality-TV series

La Voix
- Season 2
- Hosted by: Charles Lafortune
- Judges: Isabelle Boulay; Louis-Jean Cormier; Marc Dupré; Éric Lapointe
- Winner: Yoan Garneau
- Runner-up: Renee Wilkin

Release
- Original network: TVA
- Original release: January 19 – April 13, 2014

Season chronology
- ← Previous; Season 1 Next → Season 3

La Voix is the French Canadian version of The Voice. Season 2 of La Voix was broadcast from 19 January 2014 to 13 April 2014 on TVA and was hosted for a second consecutive season by Charles Lafortune. Only Marc Dupré of season 1 judges returned, whereas first season winning judge Ariane Moffatt, and other judges Jean-Pierre Ferland and Marie-Mai were replaced by Louis-Jean Cormier, Éric Lapointe and Isabelle Boulay.

During season 2, mentors also assisted various teams. They were Dan Bigras for Team Éric Lapointe, Luc De Larochellière for Team Isabelle Boulay, Martin Léon for Team Louis-Jean Cormier and France D'Amour for Team Marc Dupré.

The winner was the finalist of Team Isabelle Boulay, the 18-year-old Yoan Garneau, who originates from Ferme-Neuve, Quebec.

== Blind Auditions ==
=== Episode 1 ===
Date of broadcast : 19 January 2014

Group performance : The coaches - "La Voix que j'ai"

Order	Participants (age, city)	Song	Coach's and contestant's choices			
Order	Participants (age, city)	Song	Louis-Jean	Éric	Isabelle	Marc
1	Valérie Daure (30, Montreal)	Feeling Good - Nina Simone				
2	Adrien Aubert (29, Lac-Mégantic)	Give Me One Reason - Tracy Chapman				
3	Rémi Basque (28, Montréal)	Bord de l'eau - Vincent Vallières			—	—
4	Sonia Turcotte-Légaré (16, Longueuil)	Hero - Mariah Carey	—	—	—	—
5	Marie-Eve Fournier (25, Mascouche)	Since I've Been Loving You - Led Zeppelin				
6	Claudia Marsan (16, Lavaltrie)	Les moulins de mon coeur - Frida Boccara	—			
7	Thomas Pearce (70, Saint-Élie-de-Caxton)	Folsom Prison Blues - Johnny Cash	—	—	—	—
8	Philippe Lauzon (23, Saint-Martin)	Wagon Wheel - Bob Dylan	—			
9	Mathieu Tremblay (26, Les Escoumins)	Blurred Lines - Robin Thicke	—	—	—	—
10	Gabrielle Shonk (25, Quebec City / Providence)	Sang d'encre - Jean Leloup				
11	Julie Lefebvre (26, Saint-Rémi)	Your Body - Christina Aguilera	—		—	
12	Véronique Gilbert (31, Gatineau)	Ce soir on danse à Naziland - Nanette Workman/Starmania	—			—

=== Episode 2 ===
Date of broadcast : 26 January 2014

Order	Participant (age, city)	Song	Coach's and contestant's choices			
Order	Participant (age, city)	Song	Louis-Jean	Éric	Isabelle	Marc
1	Yoan Garneau (18, Ferme-Neuve)	Live Forever - The Highwaymen	—			
2	Mélina Laplante (19, Chambly)	One and Only - Adele			—	
3	Andy Saint-Louis (22, Varennes)	Je suis là	—	—	—	—
4	Mathieu Lavoie (38, Mascouche)	Why - Annie Lennox				—
5	Sandra Christin (45, Repentigny)	It Hurt So Bad - Susan Tedeschi	—		—	—
6	Ian Ducharme (29, Saint-Jean-de-Matha)	Je chante comme un coyote - Offenbach	—	—	—	—
7	Marie-Pier Gamache (22, Sorel-Tracy)	Highway to Hell - AC/DC	—		—	
8	Rita Tabbakh (31, Montréal)	Gravity - Sara Bareilles				
9	Francis Mondoux (41, Sorel-Tracy)	Demain j'arrête - Ben l'Oncle Soul	—	—	—	—
10	Audrey Fréchette (34, Montréal)	(You Make Me Feel Like) A Natural Woman - Aretha Franklin	—			
11	Catherine Grenier (28, Quebec City)	Born This Way - Lady Gaga	—		—	—
12	Ève Dallaire (16, Saguenay)	Des mots qui sonnent - Céline Dion	—	—	—	—
13	William Sévigny (26, Princeville)	Tenir debout - Fred Pellerin			—	—
14	G'Nee (34, Chongqing / Pierrefonds)	Halo - Beyoncé				

Note: Episode 2 experienced technical difficulties. During Catherine Grenier's audition, Éric Lapointe damaged his "I Want You" button. During G'Nee's audition, Marc Dupré and Éric Lapointe's chairs did not turn, despite them hitting their "I Want You" buttons.

=== Episode 3 ===
Date of broadcast : 2 February 2014

Order	Participant (age, city)	Song	Coach's and contestant's choices			
Order	Participant (age, city)	Song	Louis-Jean	Éric	Isabelle	Marc
1	Éléonore Lagacé (16, Montreal)	Something's Got a Hold on Me - Etta James				
2	Marie-Andrée Landry (26, Montreal / Sept-Îles)	Mappemonde - Les sœurs Boulay	—	—	—	—
3	Philippe Touzel (23, Sept-Îles)	What Goes Around... Comes Around - Justin Timberlake	—		—	—
4	Sabine Prévost (31, Longueuil)	Lovin' You, Baby - Charles Bradley	—	—		
5	Madeleine Charpentier (65, Boucherville)	Ma fille - Serge Reggiani	—	—	—	—
6	Vanessa Borduas (23, Granby)	Hound Dog - Elvis Presley	—		—	
7	Julie Ménard (40, Montreal)	Une sorte d'église - Daran	—	—		—
8	Simon Petit (33, Marieville)	R'viens pas trop tard - Zébulon				
9	Pierre Beauregard (50, Blainville)	Mes blues passent pu dans porte - Offenbach	—	—	—	—
10	Tamara-Lyne Weber-Fillion (22, Quebec City / Port-au-Prince)	Superman's Dead - Our Lady Peace	—	—		
11	Emmanuelle Duval-Auger (28, Toronto / Trois-Rivières)	Roar - Katy Perry	—		—	—
12	Renée Wilkin (25, Gatineau)	Tears of Joy - Faith Evans				
13	Rusdell Pavel Nunez Carmenate (30, Quebec City / Holguin)	Vivir mi vida - Marc Anthony	—	—	—	—
14	Mathieu Provençal (30, Saint-Charles-sur-Richelieu)	Unchain My Heart - Joe Cocker			—	

=== Episode 4 ===
Date of broadcast : 9 February 2014

Order	Participant (age, city)	Song	Coach's and contestant's choices			
Order	Participant (age, city)	Song	Louis-Jean	Éric	Isabelle	Marc
1	Rémi Chassé (28, Sainte-Marie-de-Beauce)	Whole Lotta Love - Led Zeppelin				
2	Pascal Caron (39, Cookshire-Eaton)	I Wish - Stevie Wonder	—		—	—
3	Roxane Filion (29, Montreal)	Tu ne sauras jamais - Les B.B.	—	—	—	—
4	Lawrence Castera (23, Saint-Philibert)	Home - Phillip Phillips	—		—	
5	Della Fournier (17, Saint-Alphonse-Rodriguez)	The Climb - Miley Cyrus	—	—		—
6	Marie-Onile Rodrigue (17, Lac-Mégantic)	La petite mort - Coeur de Pirate			—	—
7	Éric Mayer-Hurteau and David Y. Lazcano (28 / 28, Montreal)	The Sound of Silence - Simon and Garfunkel	—	—		—
8	Catherine Filion (22, Saguenay)	Mauvais caractère - Les Colocs	—	—	—	—
9	Thomas Hodgson (31, Saint-Jean-sur-Richelieu)	Eleanor Rigby - The Beatles		—		—
10	Léa Morgane (16, Joliette)	Wrecking Ball - Miley Cyrus	—			—
11	Marc-André Sauvageau (24, Montreal)	Qui a le droit - Patrick Bruel	—	—	—	—
12	Éloïse Boutin-Masse (20, Saint-Bruno-de-Montarville)	Back to Black - Amy Winehouse	—		—	—
13	Yanick Lanthier (36, Saint-Jérôme)	Unchained Melody - The Righteous Brothers	—	—	—	—
14	Valectra (36, Havre-Saint-Pierre)	Sympathique - Pink Martini				

=== Episode 5 ===
Date of broadcast : 16 February 2014

Order	Participant (age, city)	Song	Coach's and contestant's choices			
Order	Participant (age, city)	Song	Louis-Jean	Éric	Isabelle	Marc
1	Gabryelle Frappier (28, Longueuil)	Loadé comme un gun - Éric Lapointe	—	—	—	—
2	Philippe Berghella (35, Montreal / Saguenay)	Wicked Game - Chris Isaak				
3	Geoffroy Sauvé (26, Montreal)	No Diggity - Blackstreet			—	—
4	Valérie Lahaie (21, Lacolle)	The Edge of Glory - Lady Gaga	—			—
5	Nicolas Jobin (33, Quebec City)	Dormir dehors - Daran et les chaises	—	—	—	—
6	Joanie Roussel (25, Sainte-Thérèse / Pointe-au-Père)	The House of the Rising Sun - The Animals	—	—	—	
7	Lisa Grenier (41, Manchester)	It's a Heartache - Bonnie Tyler				
8	Sabrina Paton (29, Alma)	Ça fait mal en dedans - Zébulon	—			—
9	Mathieu Boucher (16, Rivière-du-Loup)	La désise - Daniel Boucher	—	—N/a	—	—
10	Caroline Mondou (19, Blainville)	Radioactive - Imagine Dragons	—	—N/a		—
11	Caroline Piché (28, Montreal)	Cups (When I'm Gone) - Anna Kendrick	—	—N/a	—N/a	—
12	Shiraz Adham (15, Montreal)	Les oies sauvages - Mes Aïeux		—N/a	—N/a	—
13	Élie Dupuis (19, Repentigny)	Qui sait - Daniel Lavoie	—N/a	—N/a	—N/a	

=== Duels ===
==== Episode 6 ====
Date of broadcast : 23 February 2014

The participant was safe
The participant was eliminated
The participant lost the duel, but was stolen by another coach

Order	Coach	Participants		Song	Steal			
Order	Coach	Participants		Song	Louis-Jean	Éric	Isabelle	Marc
1	Éric Lapointe	Marie-Ève Fournier	Audrey Fréchette	Welcome to the Jungle - Guns N' Roses		—N/a		
2	Louis-Jean Cormier	Rémi Chassé	Simon Petit	Piste 1 - Galaxie	—N/a	—	—	—
3	Isabelle Boulay	Della Fournier	Yoan Garneau	Islands in the Stream - Kenny Rogers and Dolly Parton	—	—	—N/a	—
4	Marc Dupré	Lisa Grenier	Melina Laplante	Entre l'ombre et la lumière - Marie Carmen	—	—	—	—N/a
5	Éric Lapointe	Catherine Grenier	Éloïse Boutin-Masse	Jamais ailleurs - Marie-Mai	—	—N/a	—	
6	Louis-Jean Cormier	Gabrielle Shonk	Mathieu Lavoie	Sunday Bloody Sunday - U2	—N/a	—	—	—
7	Isabelle Boulay	Véronique Gilbert	Sabine Prévost	Tandem - Vanessa Paradis	—	—	—N/a	—
8	Marc Dupré	Adrien Aubert	Lawrence Castera	Wake Me Up! - Avicii and Aloe Blacc	—	—	—	—N/a

==== Episode 7 ====
Date of broadcast : 2 March 2014

The participant was safe
The participant was eliminated
The participant lost the duel, but was stolen by another coach

Order	Coach	Participant		Song	Steal			
Order	Coach	Participant		Song	Louis-Jean	Éric	Isabelle	Marc
1	Marc Dupré	G'Nee	Vanessa Borduas	Impossible - Shontelle	—	—	—	—N/a
2	Louis-Jean Cormier	Rémi Basque	William Sévigny	Le train - Vilain Pingouin	—N/a	—	—¸	—
3	Isabelle Boulay	Claudia Marsan	Rita Tabbakh	Dans chacun de mes silences - Marie-Élaine Thibert	—		—N/a	—
4	Éric Lapointe	Philippe Lauzon	Sabrina Paton	Ma gueule - Johnny Hallyday		—N/a	—	
5	Marc Dupré	Valectra	Renée Wilkin	No One - Alicia Keys	—	—	—	—N/a
6	Louis-Jean Cormier	Thomas Hodgson	Shiraz Adham	On leur a fait croire - Alex Nevsky	—N/a		—	
7	Isabelle Boulay	Léa Morgane	Caroline Mondou	Titanium - David Guetta and Sia	—	—N/a	—N/a	—
8	Éric Lapointe	Sandra Christin	Mathieu Provençal	You Shook Me All Night Long - AC/DC		—N/a		—

==== Episode 8 ====
Date of broadcast : 9 March 2014

The participant was safe
The participant was eliminated
The participant lost the duel, but was stolen by another coach

Order	Coach	Participant		Song	Steal			
Order	Coach	Participant		Song	Louis-Jean	Éric	Isabelle	Marc
1	Louis-Jean Cormier	Éléonore Lagacé	Marie-Onile Rodrigue	You Can't Hurry Love - The Supremes	—N/a	—N/a	—N/a	—
2	Marc Dupré	Julie Lefebvre	Marie-Pier Gamache	Je cours - Marie-Mai		—N/a	—N/a	—N/a
3	Éric Lapointe	Pascal Caron	Philippe Touzel	Déjeuner en paix - Stéphane Eicher	—N/a	—N/a	—N/a	—
4	Isabelle Boulay	Julie Ménard	Philippe Berghella	Je t'appartiens - Gilbert Bécaud	—N/a	—N/a	—N/a	—
5	Louis-Jean Cormier	Valérie Daure	Geoffroy Sauvé	Ain't No Mountain High Enough - Marvin Gaye	—N/a	—N/a	—N/a	
6	Marc Dupré	Élie Dupuis	Joanie Roussel	Si seulement je pouvais lui manquer - Calogero	—N/a	—N/a	—N/a	—N/a
7	Éric Lapointe	Émmanuelle Duval-Auger	Valérie Lahaie	Don't Stop Believin' - Journey	—N/a	—N/a	—N/a	—N/a
8	Isabelle Boulay	Éric Mayer-Hurteau and David Y. Lazcano	Tamara-Lyne Weber-Filion	Papaoutai - Stromae	—N/a	—N/a	—N/a	—N/a

=== Battle round ===
==== Episode 9 ====
Date of broadcast : 16 March 2014

The participant was safe
The participant was eliminated

Coach	Participant	Song
Louis-Jean Cormier	Marie-Pier Gamache	Sexy and I Know It - LMFAO
Louis-Jean Cormier	Sabrina Paton	You Oughta Know - Alanis Morissette
Louis-Jean Cormier	Thomas Hodgson	La confession - Lhasa de Sela
Isabelle Boulay	Léa Morgane	Tu m'manques - La Chicane
Isabelle Boulay	Tamara-Lyne Weber-Filion	Les deux printemps - Daniel Bélanger
Isabelle Boulay	Véronique Gilbert	The Man I Love - Ella Fitzgerald
Marc Dupré	Catherine Grenier	Locked Out of Heaven - Bruno Mars
Marc Dupré	Geoffroy Sauvé	I Lost My Baby - Jean Leloup
Marc Dupré	Lawrence Castera	Never Say Never - The Fray
Éric Lapointe	Philippe Touzel	Petite Marie - Francis Cabrel
Éric Lapointe	Rita Tabbakh	Where I Stood - Missy Higgins
Éric Lapointe	Shiraz Adham	Sang pour sang - Johnny Hallyday

Songs outside competition

Order	Singers	Song
1	Louis-Jean Cormier and his team (Mathieu Lavoie, Valérie Daure, Rémi Chassé, Éléonore Lagacé, Rémi Basque, Sabrina Paton)	Complot d'enfants - Félix Leclerc
2	Isabelle Boulay and her team (Claudia Marsan, Philippe Berghella, Yoan Garneau, Sandra Christin, Marie-Ève Fournier, Véronique Gilbert )	Fais moi une place - Julien Clerc
3	Marc Dupré and his team (Renée Wilkin, Mélina Laplante, G'Nee, Élie Dupuis, Julie Lefebvre, Lawrence Castera)	With or Without You - U2
4	Éric Lapointe and his team (Mathieu Provençal, Audrey Fréchette, Valérie Lahaie, Philippe Lauzon, Éloïse Boutin-Masse, Rita Tabbakh)	Suspicious Minds - Elvis Presley

=== Live shows ===
==== Episode 10 ====
Date of broadcast : 23 March 2014

Opening song : Sheryl Crow the participants of La Voix

1. "Everyday Is a Winding Road", Mathieu Lavoie, Rémi Chassé and Sabrina Paton (Team Louis-Jean Cormier)
2. "All I Wanna Do", with Audrey Fréchette, Mathieu Provençal and Rita Tabbakh (Team Éric Lapointe)
3. "Callin' Me When I'm Lonely", with Claudia Marsan, Véronique Gilbert and Marie-Ève Fournier (Équipe Isabelle Boulay)
4. "Soak Up the Sun", with Mélina Laplante, Lawrence Castera and G'Nee (Team Marc Dupré)

The participant was safe
The participant was eliminated

Coach	Participant	Chanson	Points by coach	Points by audience	Total points
Louis-Jean Cormier	Mathieu Lavoie	Dis tout sans rien dire - Daniel Bélanger	30	9	39
Louis-Jean Cormier	Rémi Chassé	Try - Pink	50	61	111
Louis-Jean Cormier	Sabrina Paton	Ne me quitte pas - Jacques Brel	20	30	50
Éric Lapointe	Audrey Fréchette	L'espion - Michel Pagliaro	20	8	28
Éric Lapointe	Mathieu Provençal	Rockin' in the Free World - Neil Young	50	50	100
Éric Lapointe	Rita Tabbakh	Amoureuse - Véronique Sanson	30	42	72
Isabelle Boulay	Claudia Marsan	Monopolis - Starmania / France Gall	20	29	49
Isabelle Boulay	Marie-Ève Fournier	Poison Rouge - Gerry Boulet	50	42	92
Isabelle Boulay	Véronique Gilbert	Reste - Daniel Bélanger	30	29	59
Marc Dupré	G'Nee	Non, je ne regrette rien - Édith Piaf	50	30	80
Marc Dupré	Lawrence Castera	Ariane - Clément Jacques	30	25	55
Marc Dupré	Mélina Laplante	If I Were a Boy - Beyoncé	20	45	65

==== Episode 11 ====
Date broadcast : 30 March 2014

Opening song : Pierre Lapointe with the participants of La Voix

1. "La forêt des mal-aimés", with Élie Dupuis, Julie Lefebvre and Renée Wilkin (Team Marc Dupré)
2. "Le colombarium", with Valérie Lahaie, Philippe Lauzon and Éloïse Boutin-Masse (Team Éric Lapointe)
3. "La sexualité", with Rémi Basque, Valérie Daure and Éléonore Lagacé (Team Louis-Jean Cormier)
4. "Au bar des suicidés", with Philippe Berghella, Sandra Christin and Yoan Garneau (Équipe Isabelle Boulay)
5. "Deux par deux rassemblés", with all the participants

The participant was safe
The participant was eliminated

Coach	Participant	Song	Points by coach	Points by audience	Total points
Isabelle Boulay	Philippe Berghella	Break On Through - The Doors	30	16	46
Isabelle Boulay	Sandra Christin	Laisse-moi seul - Éric Lapointe	20	4	24
Isabelle Boulay	Yoan Garneau	Baby What You Want Me To Do - Neil Young	50	80	130
Marc Dupré	Élie Dupuis	Si Dieu existe - Claude Dubois	30	27	57
Marc Dupré	Julie Lefebvre	Something New - Nikki Yanofsky	20	8	28
Marc Dupré	Renée Wilkin	Je sais pas - Celine Dion	50	65	115
Éric Lapointe	Éloïse Boutin-Masse	Every Breath You Take - The Police	30	10	40
Éric Lapointe	Philippe Lauzon	Ailleurs - Marjo	20	34	54
Éric Lapointe	Valérie Lahaie	Aimons-nous - Dan Bigras	50	56	106
Louis-Jean Cormier	Éléonore Lagacé	Mon bel amour - Jim Corcoran	30	23	53
Louis-Jean Cormier	Rémi Basque	Fulton Road - Bernard Adamus	20	21	41
Louis-Jean Cormier	Valérie Daure	Je pensais pas - Daniel Lavoie (Formidable - Stromae)	50	56	106

=== Semi-final ===
==== Episode 12 ====
Date de diffusion : 6 April 2014

The participant was safe
The participant was eliminated

Coach	Participant	Chanson	Points (coach)	Points (audience)	Total points
Éric Lapointe	Mathieu Provençal	Seigneur - Kevin Parent	40	25	65
Éric Lapointe	Valérie Lahaie	Je pense encore à toi - Sylvain Cossette	60	75	135
Marc Dupré	G'Nee	Stay - Rihanna	40	14	54
Marc Dupré	Renée Wilkin	Listen - Beyoncé	60	86	146
Louis-Jean Cormier	Rémi Chassé	Elle s'en va - Patrick Norman	60	52	112
Louis-Jean Cormier	Valérie Daure	With a Little Help from My Friends - The Beatles / La Complainte du phoque en Alaska - Beau Dommage	40	48	88
Isabelle Boulay	Marie-Ève Fournier	Qu'est-ce que ça peut ben faire - Éric Lapointe	40	29	69
Isabelle Boulay	Yoan Garneau	Je t'aime évidemment - Sylvain Garneau, father of Yoan	60	71	131

=== Final ===
==== Episode 13 ====
Date of broadcast : 13 April 2014

Opening songs: Cee Lo Green with the finalists of La Voix (Rémi Chassé, Renée Wilkin, Valérie Lahaie, Yoan Garneau)

1. Crazy, from Gnarls Barkley
2. Fuck You! from Cee Lo Green

For the grand finale, like in season 1 of the series, the final song interpreted by the finalists were original songs by their respective coaches or mentors.

The participant won the title of La Voix
The participant was eliminated

Coach	Participant	Song	Lyricist / Composer
Louis-Jean Cormier	Rémi Chassé	Une armée dans la voix	Louis-Jean Cormier
Marc Dupré	Renée Wilkin	Comment je te dirais	Marc Dupré, Nelson Minville
Éric Lapointe	Valérie Lahaie	J'existe	Éric Lapointe, Roger Tabra, Stéphane Dufour
Isabelle Boulay	Yoan Garneau	T'aimer trop	Luc De Larochellière (mentor)
