= La Voix season 3 =

2015 season of French-Canadian reality-TV series

La Voix
- Season 3
- Hosted by: Charles Lafortune
- Judges: Isabelle Boulay; Marc Dupré; Éric Lapointe; Pierre Lapointe
- Winner: Kevin Bazinet
- Runner-up: Angelike Falbo

Release
- Original network: TVA
- Original release: January 18 – April 12, 2015

Season chronology
- ← Previous; Season 2 Next → Season 4

La Voix is the French Canadian version of The Voice. Season 3 of La Voix was broadcast from 18 January 2015 to 12 April 2015 on TVA and is hosted for a third consecutive season by Charles Lafortune. Éric Lapointe, Marc Dupré and Isabelle Boulay season 2 judges all returned, whereas second season judge Louis-Jean Cormier was replaced by Pierre Lapointe.

Kevin Bazinet of Team Marc Dupré won the title for the season.

== Teams ==
Color key

- Winner
- Runner-up
- Third place
- Fourth place
- Eliminated in the Live shows
- Eliminated in the Round 3
- Artist was stolen by another coach at the Battle rounds
- Eliminated in the Battle rounds

Coaches	Top 48 artists				
Pierre Lapointe					
Pierre Lapointe	Mathieu Holubowski	Dominique Fils-Aimé	Jacob Watson	Philippe Clement	Gaya Michel Elie
Pierre Lapointe	Liana Bureau	Marianne Poirier	David Fleury	Dominic Dagenais	Jean-Sabastion Michaud
Pierre Lapointe	Jaaques Rousseau	Sara Dufour	~~Cynthia Baroud~~	~~Karine-Ste Marie~~	none
Eric Lapointe					
Eric Lapointe	Rosa Laricchiuta	Celeste Levis	Simon Morin	Shararah Sinclair	Johanna Lefebvre
Eric Lapointe	Pierre-Luc Belval	Tatiana Garrido	Mathieu Langevin	Taylor Sonier	Sylvain Auclair
Eric Lapointe	Amelie B. Bedard	Sylvie DesGroseilliers	Mandy Branch	~~Myriam Arseneau~~	none
Isabelle Boulay					
Isabelle Boulay	Angelike Falbo	Lilli Ann De Francesco	Catherine Avoin	Emie Champagne	Louis-Phillip Champagne
Isabelle Boulay	Cynthia Baroud	Cedrick Goselin	Myriam Arseneau	Felicia Tremblay	Thierry Bruyere
Isabelle Boulay	Melissa Bel	Chelsey Walsh	Priscillia Quirion	~~Annabelle Doucet~~	none
Marc Dupre					
Marc Dupre	**Kevin Bazinet**	Alicia Moffet	Karine Ste-Marie	Sule Heitner	Annabelle Doucet
Marc Dupre	Elisabeth Leger	David Paradis	Audrey Miscioscia	Anthony Cyr	Francis Bedard-Petrin
Marc Dupre	~~Jacob Watson~~	~~Gaya Michel Elie~~	~~Tatiana Garrido~~	~~Mathieu Langevin~~	none
Note: Italicized names are stolen contestants (names struck through in "stolen from team"). The chosen wildcard for the finale will be bolded.

=== Blind Auditions ===
==== Episode 1 ====
Date of broadcast : 18 January 2015

Group performance : The coaches - "Le Blues du businessman" (Starmania)

Order	Contestants (age, city)	Song	Coach's and contestant's choices			
Order	Contestants (age, city)	Song	Pierre	Éric	Isabelle	Marc
1	Lili-Ann De Francesco (15, Sainte-Adèle)	Proud Mary - Tina Turner				
2	Mathieu Holubowski (26, Hudson)	Burn - Ray LaMontagne				
3	Sara Dufour (30, Dolbeau-Mistassini)	La question à 100$ - Bernard Adamus			—	—
4	Laurence Pagé (22, Otterburn Park)	Riptide - Vance Joy				
5	Shaharah Sinclair (36, Montreal)	Brown Skin - India.Arie	—			
6	William Monette (16, Sainte-Thérèse)	La dame en bleu - Michel Louvain				
7	Audrey Miscioscia (21, Belœil)	Who's Lovin' You - The Jackson Five	—			
8	David Paradis (27, Amqui)	Sex on Fire - Kings of Leon				
9	Jacques Rousseau (28, Montreal)	Poupée de cire, poupée de son - France Gall		—		
10	Pierre-Gabriel Couture (23, Grande-Rivière)	Mécaniques générales - Patrice Michaud				
11	Melissa Bel (25, Burlington, ON)	Oh! Darling - The Beatles	—			—
12	Sylvie Desgroseillers (50, Brossard)	Amazing Grace (a cappella) - John Newton				

==== Episode 2 ====
Date of broadcast : 25 January 2015

Order	Contestants (age, city)	Song	Coach's and contestant's choices			
Order	Contestants (age, city)	Song	Pierre	Éric	Isabelle	Marc
1	Dominique Fils-Aimé (30, Montreal)	Seven Nation Army - The White Stripes				
2	Jacob Watson (23, Ottawa, ON)	Shake It Off - Taylor Swift		—	—	
3	Émie Champagne (20, Victoriaville)	Ne me parlez plus d'elle - Garou	—	—		—
4	Vicky Paradis (32, Aylmer)	Out Here on My Own - Irene Cara				
5	Annabelle Doucet (24, Nigadoo, NB)	What's Love Got to Do with It - Tina Turner				
6	Anthony Cyr (17, Rosemère, QC)	Sunday Morning - Maroon 5	—			
7	Mathieu Vachon (32, Saint-Eustache, QC)	Emmenez-moi - Charles Aznavour				
8	Amélie P. Bédard (23, Orford)	Ma version du bonheur - Ariane Brunet	—		—	—
9	Philippe Clément (22, Gatineau)	A Bad Place to Reside - Jarle Bernhoft			—	—
10	Ariane Baribeau (15, Blainville)	Quand je ferme les yeux - Annie Villeneuve				
11	Cédrick Gosselin (25, Montreal)	Juste une p'tite nuitte - Les Colocs		—		—
12	Greg Noël (32, Laval)	Ordinaire - Robert Charlebois				
13	Rosa Laricchiuta (40, Shediac, NB)	Fuckin' Perfect - P!nk				
14	Gaya Michel Élie (26, Laval)	I Will Survive - Gloria Gaynor	—		—	

==== Episode 3 ====
Date of broadcast : 1 February 2015

Order	Contestants (age, city)	Song	Coach's and contestant's choices			
Order	Contestants (age, city)	Song	Pierre	Éric	Isabelle	Marc
1	Tatiana Garrido (37, Granby)	Hoochie Coochie Man - Eric Clapton				
2	Rébecca Leclerc (21, Chicoutimi)	Mon amant de Saint-Jean - Lucienne Delyle				
3	Sule Heitner (42, Pierrefonds)	Crazy - Seal	—	—	—	
4	Karine Sainte-Marie (29, Sainte-Marguerite-du-Lac-Masson)	Si j'étais un homme - Diane Tell			—	—
5	Catherine Avoine (40, Chambly)	Hallelujah - Leonard Cohen	—			
6	Anne-Marie Soucy (27, Montreal)	Kiss with a Fist - Florence and the Machine				
7	Jean-Sébastien Michaud (29, Montreal)	C'est un monde - Fred Pellerin		—	—	—
8	Sylvain Auclair (43, Montreal)	Best of You - Foo Fighters	—			—
9	Alicia Moffet (16, Saint-Lazare)	At Last - Etta James	—			
10	Syd Bédard (46, Granby)	Long Train Runnin' - Doobie Brothers				
11	Myriam Arseneau (18, Robertville, NB)	Ne reviens pas - Salomé Leclerc	—			—
12	Félicia Tremblay (28, Saint-Jérôme)	Ma liberté - Georges Moustaki	—	—		—
13	Dolceamare^{1} (25/29, Montreal / Laval)	Do What U Want - Lady Gaga				
14	Pierre-Luc Belval (19, Sainte-Sabine)	Stand by Me - Ben E. King				

1. Composed of Nadia Marie Ricci (29 years, Montreal) and Alessandra Tropeano (25 years, Laval)

==== Episode 4 ====
Date of broadcast : 8 February 2015

Order	Contestants (age, city)	Song	Coach's and contestant's choices			
Order	Contestants (age, city)	Song	Pierre	Éric	Isabelle	Marc
1	Thierry Bruyère (30, Montreal)	Pendant que les champs brûlent - Niagara		—		
2	Johanne Lefebvre (45, East Farnham)	Caruso - Lucio Dalla	—		—	—
3	Mélissa Ouimet (29, St. Albert, ON)	Paris (Ooh La La) - Grace Potter and the Nocturnals				
4	Kevin Bazinet (23, Mont-Laurier)	Latch - Disclosure and Sam Smith				
5	Cynthia Baroud (34, Beirut, Lebanon)	L'Aigle noir - Barbara		—	—	—
6	William Cloutier (19, Victoriaville)	All of Me - John Legend				
7	Taylor Sonier (16, Summerside, PEI)	I'd Rather Go Blind - Etta James	—			—
8	Dominique Breault (21, Sainte-Adèle)	Je joue de la guitare - Jean Leloup				
9	Francis Bédard-Pétrin (25, Saint-Jean-sur-Richelieu)	Après toi, le déluge - Bruno Pelletier	—	—		
10	Mandy Branch (21, Sainte-Catherine, QC)	Yoü and I - Lady Gaga	—		—	—
11	Marianne Poirier (18, Quebec City)	Deux par deux rassemblés - Pierre Lapointe		—		
12	David Jobin (29, Montreal)	Respirer la fumée - Fanny Bloom				
13	Angelike Falbo (16, Montreal)	You Lost Me - Christina Aguilera	—	—		—
14	Liana Bureau (22, Quebec City)	Crazy in Love - Beyoncé				

==== Episode 5 ====
Date of broadcast : 15 February 2015

Order	Contestants (age, city)	Song	Coach's and contestant's choices			
Order	Contestants (age, city)	Song	Pierre	Éric	Isabelle	Marc
1	Louis-Philip (26, Saint-Lazare)	Bridge over Troubled Water - Simon and Garfunkel				
2	Chloé Lamontagne (22, Beaumont)	You Know I'm No Good - Amy Winehouse				
3	David Fleury (21, Saint-Bruno-de-Montarville)	Je fais de moi un homme - Daniel Bélanger		—	—	—
4	Chesley Walsh (29, Los Angeles, USA)	Dreams - Fleetwood Mac	—			
5	Élisabeth Léger (23, Lac-Mégantic)	Comme ils disent - Charles Aznavour	—	—	—	
6	Jason Maynard (27, Montreal)	Moondance - Van Morrison				
7	Simon Morin (26, Montreal)	Come with Me Now - Kongos				
8	Priscillia Quirion (23, Magog)	Les hommes disent peu - Alex Nevsky	—	—		—
9	Mathieu Langevin (24, Maniwaki)	Le kid - Jonathan Painchaud			—N/a	
10	Marie-Ève Villemure (33, Grand-Mère)	Fruits défendus - Brigitte Boisjoli				
11	Dominic Dagenais (37, Montreal)	Master Blaster (Jammin') - Stevie Wonder			—N/a	—N/a
12	Céleste Lévis (20, Timmins, ON)	Moisi Moé'ssi - Fred Fortin	—N/a		—N/a	—N/a

=== Duels round ===
==== Episode 6 ====
Again for this season, the coaches were assisted by mentors in the battle round. They were Philippe B in Team Pierre Lapointe, Linda Lemay in Team Éric Lapointe, Vincent Vallières in Team Isabelle Boulay and Alex Nevsky in Team Marc Dupré.

Date of broadcast : 22 February 2015

The contestant was safe
The contestant was eliminated
The contestant lost the duel, but was stolen by another coach

Order	Coach	Contestants		Song	Steals			
Order	Coach	Contestants		Song	Pierre	Éric	Isabelle	Marc
1	Pierre	Cynthia Baroud	Dominique Fils-Aimé	Royals - Lorde	—N/a	-		
2	Éric	Sylvain Auclair	Simon Morin	Les Bombes - Michel Pagliaro	—	—N/a	—	—
3	Marc	Anthony Cyr	Kevin Bazinet	I'm Not the Only One - Sam Smith	—	—	—	—N/a
4	Isabelle	Priscillia Quirion	Catherine Avoine	Le chant de la douleur - Gerry Boulet	—	—	—N/a	—
5	Pierre	David Fleury	Sara Dufour	L'amour passe à travers le linge - Avec pas d'casque	—N/a	—	—	—
6	Éric	Amélie P. Bédard	Céleste Lévis	Le saule - Isabelle Boulay	—	—N/a	—	—
7	Marc	Jacob Watson	Sule Heitner	Let Her Go - Passenger		—	—	—N/a
8	Isabelle	Annabelle Doucet	Lili-Ann De Francesco	River Deep, Mountain High - Tina Turner			—N/a	

==== Episode 7 ====
Date of broadcast : 1 March 2015

The contestant was safe
The contestant was eliminated
The contestant lost the duel, but was stolen by another coach

Order	Coach	Contestants		Song	Coach			
Order	Coach	Contestants		Song	Pierre	Éric	Isabelle	Marc
1	Marc	Alicia Moffet	Gaya Michel Élie	Set Fire to the Rain - Adele			-	—N/a
2	Isabelle	Cédrick Gosselin	Félicia Tremblay	Câlisse-moi là - Lisa Leblanc	—N/a	—	—N/a	—
3	Pierre	Karine Sainte-Marie	Mathieu Holubowski	Always on My Mind - Willie Nelson	—N/a			
4	Eric	Mandy Branch	Rosa Laricchiuta	Bring Me Some Water - Melissa Etheridge	—N/a	—N/a	—	—N/a
5	Marc	Élisabeth Léger	Francis Bédard-Pétrin	Ils s'aiment - Daniel Lavoie	—N/a	—	—	—N/a
6	Isabelle	Chesley Walsh	Louis-Philip Champagne	Without You - Harry Nilsson	—N/a	—	—N/a	—N/a
7	Pierre	Marianne Poirier	Jacques Rousseau	Saint Claude - Christine and the Queens	—N/a	—	—	—N/a
8	Éric	Johanne Lefebvre	Sylvie Desgroseillers	Je ne suis qu'une chanson - Ginette Reno	—N/a	—N/a	—	—N/a

==== Episode 8 ====
Date of broadcast : 8 March 2015

The contestant was safe
The contestant was eliminated
The contestant lost the duel, but was stolen by another coach

Order	Coach	Contestants		Song	Steals			
Order	Coach	Contestants		Song	Pierre	Éric	Isabelle	Marc
1	Pierre	Dominic Dagenais	Liana Bureau	Sing - Ed Sheeran	—N/a	—	—	—N/a
2	Isabelle	Émie Champagne	Thierry Bruyère	Ce soir l'amour est dans tes yeux - Louis-Jean Cormier (version)	—N/a	—	—N/a	—N/a
3	Éric	Pierre-Luc Belval	Taylor Sonier	Burning Love - Elvis Presley	—N/a	—N/a	—	—N/a
4	Marc	Audrey Miscioscia	Tatiana Garrido	Lady Marmalade - Nanette Workman	—N/a			—N/a
5	Pierre	Jean-Sébastien Michaud	Philippe Clément	L'ascenseur - Louis-Jean Cormier	—N/a	—	—	—N/a
6	Isabelle	Angelike Falbo	Melissa Bel	Chandelier - Sia	—N/a	—	—N/a	—N/a
7	Éric	Myriam Arseneau	Shaharah Sinclair	Fever - Peggy Lee	—N/a	—N/a		—N/a
8	Marc	David Paradis	Mathieu Langevin	Ces gens qui dansent - Gazoline	—N/a		—N/a	—N/a

=== Battle round ===
==== Episode 9 ====
Date of broadcast : 15 March 2015

The contestant was safe
The contestant was eliminated

Coach	Contestant	Song
Eric Lapointe	Tatiana Garrido	I Lost My Baby - Jean Leloup
Eric Lapointe	Mathieu Langevin	Mauvais caractère - Les Colocs
Eric Lapointe	Céleste Lévis	I Can't Make You Love Me - Adele (version)
Isabelle Boulay	Angelike Falbo	Fool In Love - Rihanna
Isabelle Boulay	Cédrick Gosselin	Tue-moi - Dan Bigras
Isabelle Boulay	Myriam Arseneau	Tant qu'à venir sur la Terre - Angèle Arsenault
Pierre Lapointe	Marianne Poirier	Nos joies répétitives - Pierre Lapointe
Pierre Lapointe	Gaya Michel Élie	Uptown Funk - Mark Ronson and Bruno Mars
Pierre Lapointe	David Fleury	Ton amour a changé ma vie - Les Classels
Marc Dupré	Elisabeth Léger	Tenir debout - Fred Pellerin
Marc Dupré	David Paradis	Stolen Dance - Milky Chance
Marc Dupré	Audrey Miscioscia	Faut que j'me pousse - Offenbach

Songs outside competition

Order	Singers	Song
1	Éric Lapointe and his team (Simon Morin, Rosa Larrichiuta, Johanne Lefebvre, Pierre-Luc Belval, Shaharah Sinclair, Céleste Lévis)	Old Time Rock and Roll - Bob Seger
2	Isabelle Boulay and her team (Émie Champagne, Cynthia Baroud, Louis-Philip Champagne, Catherine Avoine, Lili-Ann De Francesco, Angelike Falbo)	On va s'aimer encore - Vincent Vallières
3	Pierre Lapointe and his team (Mathieu Holubowski, Liana Bureau, Jacob Watson, Philippe Clément, Dominique Fils-Aimé, Gaya Michel Élie)	Tous les garçons et les filles - Françoise Hardy
4	Marc Dupré and his team (Kevin Bazinet, Karine Sainte-Marie, Sule Heitner, Anabelle Doucet, Alicia Moffet, Elisabeth Leger)	I Want to Hold Your Hand - The Beatles

=== Live shows ===
==== Episode 10 ====
Date of broadcast : 22 March 2015

Opening performance : Si tu reviens - Louis-Jean Cormier with coaches and Contestantsin La Voix

Contestant saved
Contestant eliminated

Coach	Contestant	Song	Points (coach)	Points (audience)	Total points
Isabelle Boulay	Cynthia Baroud	Aranjuez mon amour - Richard Anthony	20	21	41
Isabelle Boulay	Lili-Ann De Francesco	J'entends frapper - Michel Pagliaro	50	60	**110**
Isabelle Boulay	Louis-Philip Champagne	Pleine lune en décembre - Zachary Richard	30	19	49
Pierre Lapointe	Dominique Fils-Aimé	Hit the Road Jack - Ray Charles	50	25	**75**
Pierre Lapointe	Gaya Michel Élie	Le mal du pays - Manno Charlemagne	30	35	65
Pierre Lapointe	Liana Bureau	Tous les mêmes - Stromae	20	40	60
Marc Dupré	Annabelle Doucet	Je veux - Zaz	20	13	33
Marc Dupré	Elisabeth Leger	Ficelles - Ingrid St-Pierre	30	7	37
Marc Dupré	Kevin Bazinet	Jealous Guy - John Lennon	50	80	**130**
Éric Lapointe	Johanne Lefebvre	Mon Dieu - Édith Piaf	30	29	59
Éric Lapointe	Pierre-Luc Belval	Méfiez-vous du grand amour - Michel Rivard	20	23	43
Éric Lapointe	Rosa Laricchiuta	Casser la voix - Patrick Bruel	50	48	**98**

==== Episode 11 ====
Date of broadcast : 29 March 2015

Opening performance : Ariane Moffatt with Contestants of La Voix

- Je veux tout, with Karine Sainte-Marie, Émie Champagne, Céleste Lévis and Mathieu Holubowski;
- Reverbère, with Simon Morin, Sule Heitner, Jacob Watson and Catherine Avoine;
- Debout, with Alicia Moffet, Angelike Falbo, Shaharah Sinclair and Philippe Clément.

Contestant saved
Contestant eliminated

Coach	Contestant	Song	Points (coach)	Points (audience)	Total points
Éric Lapointe	Simon Morin	Take Me to Church - Hozier	30	36	66
Éric Lapointe	Shaharah Sinclair	Ces bottes sont faites pour marcher - Nancy Sinatra	20	4	24
Éric Lapointe	Céleste Lévis	Avec le temps - Léo Ferré	50	60	**110**
Marc Dupré	Sule Heitner	Marie-Jo - Karim Ouellet	20	10	30
Marc Dupré	Karine Sainte-Marie	French Cancan - Inna Modja	30	16	46
Marc Dupré	Alicia Moffet	Fix You - Coldplay	50	74	**124**
Pierre Lapointe	Philippe Clément	Camouflar - Galaxie	30	14	44
Pierre Lapointe	Mathieu Holubowski	J'ai souvenir encore - Claude Dubois	50	70	**120**
Pierre Lapointe	Jacob Watson	Jolie Louise - Daniel Lanois	20	16	36
Isabelle Boulay	Émie Champagne	Il faut savoir - Charles Aznavour	30	12	42
Isabelle Boulay	Catherine Avoine	Georgia on My Mind - Ray Charles	50	24	74
Isabelle Boulay	Angelike Falbo	Je t'aime - Lara Fabian	20	64	**84**

==== Episode 12 (Semi finals) ====
Date of broadcast : 5 April 2015

Contestant saved
Contestant eliminated

Coach	Contestant	Song	Points (coach)	Points (audience)	Total points
Pierre Lapointe	Dominique Fils-Aimé	Sans regret - Brigitte Boisjoli	40	21	61
Pierre Lapointe	Mathieu Holubowski	Girl from the North Country - Bob Dylan	60	79	**139**
Isabelle Boulay	Angelike Falbo	Say Something - Christina Aguilera	60	46	**106**
Isabelle Boulay	Lili-Ann de Francesco	Je vole - Michel Sardou	40	54	94
Éric Lapointe	Céleste Lévis	L'essentiel - Ginette Reno	40	57	97
Éric Lapointe	Rosa Laricchiuta	The Show Must Go On - Queen	60	43	**103**
Marc Dupré	Alicia Moffet	Le monde est stone - Starmania	40	16	56
Marc Dupré	Kevin Bazinet	L'amour existe encore - Céline Dion	60	84	**144**

==== Episode 13 (Finals) ====
Date of broadcast : 12 April 2015

Winner

Finalists

Coach	Contestant	Song	Songwriter(s)	Percentage of votes
Éric Lapointe	Rosa Laricchiuta	Je pleure	Lynda Lemay, Éric Lapointe, Stéphane Dufour	16
Pierre Lapointe	Mathieu Holubowski	Feuille d'argent et feuille d'or	Pierre Lapointe, Philippe B	14
Marc Dupré	**Kevin Bazinet**	Jusqu'où tu m'aimes	Marc Dupré, Alex Nevsky, Gautier Marinof	**46**
Isabelle Boulay	Angelike Falbo	Comme un appel	Vincent Vallières	24

== Appearances in other shows ==
- Taylor Sonier competed in Canada's Maritime Idol in 2014, the eight year of the contest, and was the winner for the year.
- Alicia Moffet competed in Canada's The Next Star in Season 6 of the show in 2013, and was the winner for the season.
- Simon Morin competed in France's The Voice – La plus belle voix in Season 7 of the show in 2018. He was selected at the Blind Auditions stage, but was eliminated later in the show.
