= La Voix season 1 =

2013 season of French-Canadian reality-TV series

La Voix
- Season 1
- Hosted by: Charles Lafortune
- Judges: Marc Dupré; Jean-Pierre Ferland; Marie-Mai; Ariane Moffatt
- Winner: Valérie Carpentier
- Runner-up: Charlotte Cardin-Goyer

Release
- Original network: TVA
- Original release: 20 January – 14 April 2013

Season chronology
- Next → Season 2

La Voix is the French Canadian version of The Voice. The first season of La Voix premiered on the TVA on 20 January 2013 and ended on 14 April 2013. It featured Marc Dupré, Jean-Pierre Ferland, Marie-Mai and Ariane Moffatt as the coaches. During the seasons mentors also took part. They were Daniel Bélanger, Claude Dubois, Annie Villeneuve and Fred St-Gelais. The series was produced by Stéphane Laporte and hosted by Charles Lafortune. The winner was Valérie Carpentier from Ariane Moffatt's Team.

== Season summary ==
Winner
Finalist

Coaches	Candidates					
Coaches	Finalists	Participant eliminated	Participant eliminated	Participant eliminated	Participant eliminated	Participant eliminated
Ariane Moffatt	Valérie Carpentier	Étienne Cousineau	Stevens Simeon	Valérie Clio Nerestant	Dany Flanders	Karine Deschamps
Marc Dupré	Jérôme Couture	Jael Bird Joseph	Andie Duquette	Edi Hysi	Alexe Gaudreault-Dallaire	Stéphanie and Sabrina Barabé
Marie-Mai	Charlotte Cardin	Jacynthe Véronneau	Valérie Amyot	Jeffrey Piton	Fred Lebel	Félix-Antoine Couturier
Jean-Pierre Ferland	Étienne Cotton	Julie Massicotte	Meredith Marshall	Maria Janice Galvez	Joanie Roussel	Jean Sébastien Lavoie

During the season, mentors also assisted various teams. They were:

- Daniel Bélanger for Team Ariane Moffatt
- Claude Dubois for Team Jean-Pierre Ferland
- Annie Villeneuve for Team Marc Dupré
- Fred St-Gelais for Team Marie-Mai.

== Round 1: Blind auditions ==
=== Episode 1 ===
Order	Participant (age, city)	Song	Coach's and contestant's choices			
Order	Participant (age, city)	Song	Ariane	Jean-Pierre	Marie-Mai	Marc
1	Amy-Jade Leblanc (16, Pointe-aux-Trembles)	Ayoye – Offenbach	—	—		
2	Alex Balduzzi (16, Nice, France)	Amsterdam – Jacques Brel	—	—	—	—
3	Bryan Tyler (51, Fredericton, NB)	I'm a Bluesman – Johnny Winter		—		
4	Claudia Parisien (19, Hawkesbury, ON)	Comme avant – Marie-Mai	—		—	—
5	Cyusa (?, Montreal)	Chus au Québec, remix of I'm in Miami Trick – LMFAO	—	—	—	—
6	Émilie Leclerc (24, Terrebonne)	Demain n'existe pas – Lara Fabian	—	—	—	—
7	Étienne Cousineau (32, Montreal)	Ebben ne andro lontana – La Wally		—	—	—
8	Fred Lebel (41, Rimouski)	Highway to Hell – AC/DC	—	—		
9	Gabriella Delorme-Grenier (20, Saint-Eustache / La Paz, Bolivia)	Avec le temps – Léo Ferré	—		—	—
10	Jacynthe Véronneau (20, Saint-François-Xavier-de-Brompton)	Animal – France D'Amour				
11	Julie Massicotte (40, Trois-Rivières)	Le monde est stone – Fabienne Thibeault/Starmania	—		—	—
12	Maria Janice Galvez (29, Angono, Philippines)	Quand les hommes vivront d'amour – Raymond Lévesque	—		—	—
13	Meredith Marshall (48, Austin, USA)	Piece of My Heart – Janis Joplin	—		—	—
14	Sabrina and Stéphanie Barabé (28, Quebec City)	The Rose – Bette Midler				
15	Stevens Simeon (19, Montreal)	Lean on Me – Bill Withers		—		
16	Valérie Amyot (21, Quebec City)	Cabaret – Cabaret				
17	Valérie Clio Nerestant (36, Saint-Hubert)	Black Coffee – Ella Fitzgerald				

=== Episode 2 ===
Order	Participant (age, city)	Song	Coach's and contestant's choices			
Order	Participant (age, city)	Song	Ariane	Jean-Pierre	Marie-Mai	Marc
1	Joanie Roussel (24, Sainte-Thérèse)	L'amour existe encore – Céline Dion	—		—	
2	Stephan McNicoll (42, Île-des-Soeurs)	Burning Love – Elvis Presley	—			
3	Julie Lefebvre (25, La Prairie)	I've Got the Music In Me – Kiki Dee	—	—	—	—
4	Valérie Carpentier (19, Sainte-Anne-de-la-Pérade)	Cry Me a River – Julie London		—		—
5	Mathieu Dussault (31, Sherbrooke)	Provocante – Marjo	—	—	—	—
6	Jael Bird Joseph (28, Trois-Rivières)	Gravity – John Mayer	—			
7	Léa Morgane (16, Joliette)	And I Am Telling You I'm Not Going – Dreamgirls	—	—		
8	Sylvie Pellerin (54, Saint-Étienne-de-Bolton)	L'amour est un oiseau rebelle – Carmen				
9	Gabryelle Frappier (27, Fleurimont)	Nothing Compares 2 U – Sinéad O'Connor	—		—	—
10	Isabelle Sinclair and Mathieu Provost (29 / 29, Aylmer / Montreal)	J'te l'dis quand même – Patrick Bruel	—	—	—	—
11	Alexe Gaudreault (20, Quebec City / Dolbeau-Mistassini)	Quand on n'a que l'amour – Jacques Brel	—	—		
12	Jeffrey Piton (23, Saint-Jean-sur-Richelieu)	The A Team – Ed Sheeran				
13	Thomas Olivier (19, Montreal / Lille)	Jeune et con – Damien Saez		—	—	—
14	Henrik Lajoie (22, Saint-Eugène)	Brun (la couleur de l'amour) – Bernard Adamus		—	—	—
15	Mark Elkes (32, Joliette / Crowborough)	Hurt – Nine Inch Nails		—	—	—
16	Mélissa Blouin (18, Saint-Eustache)	Adieu – Cœur de pirate	—	—	—	—
17	Nathalie Carbonneau (42, Malartic)	Me and Bobby McGee – Janis Joplin	—		—	
18	Jean-Sébastien Lavoie (34, Montreal)	Angels – Robbie Williams	—			—

=== Episode 3 ===
Order	Participant (age, city)	Song	Coach's and contestant's choices			
Order	Participant (age, city)	Song	Ariane	Jean-Pierre	Marie-Mai	Marc
1	Karine Deschamps (32, Montreal)	"Chante encore" – Daniel Bélanger		—	—	
2	Carolane Cloutier (19, East Broughton)	"Last Name" – Carrie Underwood	—	—		—
3	Priscilla Vatrano (31, Pointe-aux-Trembles)	"Yoü and I" – Lady Gaga				
4	Mathilda Kamuena (20, Montreal / Kinshasa)	"Je veux tout" – Ariane Moffatt	—	—	—	
5	Érick-François Riendeau (42, Saint-Georges)	"All I Asked of You" – from The Phantom of the Opera	—	—	—	—
6	Jérôme Couture (28, Longueuil / Saguenay)	"Moves like Jagger" – Maroon 5			—	
7	Andréanne Martin (25, Lac-Beauport)	"Je veux" – Zaz		—		—
8	Cynthia Harvey (37, Saguenay)	"Saving All My Love For You" – Whitney Houston	—	—		—
9	Annie Chartrand (36, Saint-Lazare)	"Rock pour un gars d'bicycle" – Diane Dufresne	—	—	—	—
10	Rick Hughes (50, Otterburn Park)	"Rock and Roll" – Led Zeppelin		—		
11	Jean Ravel (51, Quebec City)	"Somebody to Love" – Queen	—	—		—
12	Myranie Castilloux (26, Quebec City / Paspébiac)	"Soon We'll Be Found" – Sia	—		—	—
13	Kath Biss (24, Mascouche)	"Amoureuse" – Marjo	—	—	—	—
14	Félix-Antoine Couturier (30, Saint-Jean-sur-Richelieu)	"Mes blues passent pu dans porte" – Offenbach	—	—		—
15	Julie Levac (34, Terrebonne)	"Mercy" – Duffy		—	—	
16	Isabelle Robert (26, Blainville)	"Stay" – Chaka Khan		—	—	—
17	Roxanne Bacon (17, Terrebonne)	"Il m'a montré à yodler" – Manon Bédard	—		—	—

=== Episode 4 ===
Order	Participant (age, city)	Song	Coach's and contestant's choices			
Order	Participant (age, city)	Song	Ariane	Jean-Pierre	Marie-Mai	Marc
1	Émanuelle Robitaille (27, Quebec City)	"It's a Man's Man's Man's World" – James Brown				—
2	Virginie Péloquin (19, Montréal-Nord)	"Turning Tables" – Adele	—	—	—	
3	Simon Lacerte (19, Trois-Rivières)	"I Lost My Baby" – Jean Leloup	—	—	—	—
4	Marie-Ève Bédard and Marc-André Rouillard (20 / 20, Drummondville)	"Reviens-moi" – Dany Bédar	—	—		—
5	Edi Hysi (24, Montréal / Shkodra)	"Heaven" – Bryan Adams	—	—	—	
6	Ysabelle Bertrand (22, Gatineau)	"Boogie Oogie Oogie" – A Taste of Honey				
7	Claudia Samson (16, La Malbaie)	"I'm Alive" – Céline Dion	—	—	—	—
8	Carolyne Drolet (26, Brossard)	"J'te mentirais" – Patrick Bruel	—			
9	Julie D'Aoust (28, Gatineau)	"Before He Cheats" – Carrie Underwood	—	—	—	
10	Marie-Pier Barnabé (30, Lévis)	"L'essentiel" – Ginette Reno	—	—	—	—
11	Dany Flanders (47, Fort Lauderdale, Florida / Stanstead)	"Let's Get It On" – Marvin Gaye		—	—	—
12	François Verreault Girard (25, Château-Richer)	"Cap enragé" – Zachary Richard	—N/a		—	—
13	Jacques Lebel (42, Montreal)	"Je pense encore à toi" – Sylvain Cossette	—N/a		—	—
14	Étienne Cotton (31, Rimouski)	"Que je t'aime" – Johnny Hallyday	—N/a		—	—
15	Charlotte Cardin-Goyer (18, Montreal)	"You Know I'm No Good" – Amy Winehouse	—N/a	—N/a		
16	Vicky Marchand (42, Saint-Bruno-de-Guigues)	"Faire la paix avec l'amour" – Dany Bédar	—N/a	—N/a	—	—
17	Andie Duquette (24, Montreal)	"Barracuda" – Heart	—N/a	—N/a		
18	Jonathan Guilbault (27, Montreal)	"Spell It Out" – Gavin DeGraw	—N/a	—N/a		—N/a

=== Round 2: Battle rounds ===
During the battle round, two candidates from the same team are paired by the team coach to battle it out in a duo performance of a song chosen by the coach, who decides which of the performing duo moves on to the next round.

The contestant is saved
The contestant is eliminated

Coach	Winner	Song	Loser
Marie-Mai	Jacynthe Véronneau	"Stronger (What Doesn't Kill You)"	Carolane Cloutier
Ariane Moffat	Dany Flanders	"Dangereux"	Rick Hughes
Marc Dupré	Amy-Jade Leblanc	"Encore une nuit"	Virginie Péloquin
Jean-Pierre Ferland	Joanie Roussel	"Les yeux du cœur"	Jacques Lebel
Marie-Mai	Valérie Amyot	"Tous les cris les S.O.S."	Cynthia Harvey
Ariane Moffat	Valérie Clio Nerestant	"Man in the Mirror"	Isabelle Robert
Marc Dupré	Edi Hysi	"Life Is a Highway"	Stephan McNicoll
Jean-Pierre Ferland	Maria–Janice Galvez	"Les uns contre les autres"	Gabryelle Frappier
Marc Dupré	Andie Duquette	"Rolling in the Deep"	Nathalie Carbonneau
Jean-Pierre Ferland	Julie Massicotte	"Caline de Blues"	Claudia Parisien
Marie-Mai	Fred Lebel	"Beat It"	Jean Ravel
Ariane Moffat	Karine Deschamps	"Ella, elle l'a"	Andréanne Martin
Marc Dupré	Alexe Gaudreault	"C'est Zéro"	Julie Levac
Jean-Pierre Ferland	Étienne Cotton	"Je l'aime à mourir"	Gabriella Delorme Grenier
Marie-Mai	Charlotte Cardin-Goyer	"Si tu savais"	Carolyne Drolet
Ariane Moffat	Étienne Cousineau	"Miss Sarajevo"	Mark Elkes
Marc Dupré	Stéphanie and Sabrina Barabé	"Reste là"	Julie D'Aoust
Jean-Pierre Ferland	Meredith Marshall	"Un amour qui ne veut pas mourir" / "Never Ending Love"	Roxanne Bacon
Marie-Mai	Jeffrey Piton	"Hey, Soul Sister"	Marie-Eve Bédard and Marc-André Rouillard
Ariane Moffat	Émanuelle Robitaille	"No More Tears (Enough Is Enough)"	Ysabelle Bertrand
Marc Dupré	Jérôme Couture	"I Heard It Through the Grapevine"	Brian Tyler
Jean-Pierre Ferland	Jean Sébastien Lavoie	"La Manic"	François Verreault-Girard
Marie-Mai	Félix-Antoine Couturier	"Si fragile"	Jonathan Guilbault
Ariane Moffat	Valérie Carpentier	"La Vie en rose"	Thomas Olivier
Marc Dupré	Jael Bird Joseph	"Parce qu'on vient de loin"	Mathilda Kamuela
Jean-Pierre Ferland	Myranie Castilloux	"Calling You"	Sylvie Pellerin
Marie-Mai	Léa Morgane	"Regarde-moi"	Priscilla Vatrano
Ariane Moffat	Stevens Simeon	"L'Amour"	Henrik Lajoie

=== Round 3: Chants de Bataille ===
In this round, each coach chooses two contestants from the remaining seven in his team that should interpret solo a song chosen by the coach. At the end, the coach based on what he heard decides to keep one of them and send the other home, with him/her ending up with six contestants in his/her team.

The contestant is safe
The contestant is eliminated

Coach	Winner	Song	Loser
Marc Dupré	Edi Hysi	"Entre deux mondes"	Amy-Jade Leblanc
Jean-Pierre Ferland	Maria Janice Galvez	"Un peu plus haut"	Myranie Castilloux
Marie-Mai	Jacynthe Véronneau	"Emmène-moi"	Léa Morgane
Ariane Moffat	Karine Deschamps	"Réverbère"	Émanuelle Robitaille

=== Round 4: Live shows (Directs) ===
In this stage the contest is broadcast live with the public having a say in the fate of the contestants.

==== First finals (1/8) ====
The program spread on two weeks of 2 hours each, asks for each coach to nominate three of his contestants one week and three others the next, to sing songs of their own choice. Each day, one contestant is saved by the public vote and getting most votes, and one of the remaining two is saved by the coach with the third contestant being eliminated. At the end of this phase, each coach would end up with four of his six contestants for the following round.

The contestant is saved by public vote
The contestant is saved by the coach
The contestant is eliminated

Coach	Contestant	First Song	Contestant	Second Song	Contestant	Third Song
Week 1
Marie-Mai	Charlotte Cardin-Goyer	"Autumn Leaves"	Valérie Amyot	"La forêt des mal-aimés"	Félix-Antoine Couturier	"Sensualité"
Jean-Pierre Ferland	Étienne Cotton	"Notre sentier"	Maria Janice Galvez	"Je ne suis qu'une chanson"	Jean Sébastien Lavoie	"When I Was Your Man"
Marc Dupré	Jérôme Couture	"Crazy"	Jael Bird Joseph	"Te quitter"	Stéphanie and Sabrina Barabé	"Tu es mon autre"
Ariane Moffat	Étienne Cousineau	"Hymne à l'amour"	Valérie Clio Nerestant	"J'ai vu"	Karine Deschamps	"Stop!"
Week 2
Marie-Mai	Jacynthe Véronneau	"Let It Be"	Jeffrey Piton	"T'es dans la lune"	Fred Lebel	"Baba O'Riley"
Jean-Pierre Ferland	Julie Massicotte	"Il était une fois des gens heureux"	Meredith Marshall	"Feeling Good"	Joanie Roussel	"Quand on ne vous aime plus"
Marc Dupré	Edi Hysi	"It Will Rain"	Andie Duquette	"Casser la voix"	Alexe Gaudreault-Dallaire	"Tout au bout de nos peines"
Ariane Moffat	Valérie Carpentier	"Video Games"	Stevens Simeon	"Soulman"	Dany Flanders	"Aimer d'amour"

==== Quarter finals ====
Each group now containing four contestants each would be reduced to half, with one candidated from each group chosen by the public vote and one other saved by the coach.

The contestant saved by public vote
The contestant saved by the coach
The contestant is eliminated

Coach	Contestant	First Song	Contestant	Second Song	Contestant	Third Song	Contestant	Fourth Song
Marie Mai	Jacynthe Véronneau	"Belleville Rendez-vous"	Charlotte Cardin-Goyer	"Can't Take My Eyes Off You"	Jeffrey Piton	"Place de la République"	Valérie Amyot	"Candyman"
Jean-Pierre Ferland	Étienne Cotton	"Comme d'habitude"	Julie Massicotte	"Everybody Hurts"	Maria Janice Galvez	"Let It Rain"	Meredith Marshall	"Une femme avec toi"
Marc Dupré	Jérôme Couture	"Ce soir on danse à Naziland"	Jael Bird Joseph	"Father and Son"	Andie Duquette	"You Give Love a Bad Name"	Edi Hysi	"Ce que tu veux"
Ariane Moffat	Valérie Carpentier	"Skyfall"	Étienne Cousineau	"Memories"	Stevens Simeon	"Linoléum"	Valérie Clio Nerestant	"Time After Time"

==== Semi-finals ====
In this round the two remaining contestants in each team would perform against each other to arrive at one finalist from each team. The coach would distribute his 100 points between his two contestants. To this would be added the percentages obtained through public vote to arrive at a general average to decide the finalist from the group.

The contestant is saved and reaches the final
The contestant is eliminated

Coach	Contestant	First Song	Points by Coach	Points by public	Total points	Contestant	Second Song	Points by Coach	Points by public	Total points
Marie-Mai	Jacynthe Véronneau	"Ave Maria"	40	49	89	Charlotte Cardin-Goyer	"Hurt"	60	51	111
Jean-Pierre Ferland	Julie Massicotte	"Vivre avec celui qu'on aime"	48	47	95	Étienne Cotton	"Coeur de rocker"	52	53	105
Marc Dupré	Jérôme Couture	"Cry Me a River"	55	55	110	Jael Bird Joseph	"Je voudrais voir New York"	45	45	90
Ariane Moffat	Valérie Carpentier	"Dis, quand reviendras-tu?"	58	89	147	Étienne Cousineau	"Life on Mars?"	42	11	53

==== Finale ====
Performances

In the final, the contestants had to sing a song written and composed by their respective coaches

Coach	Participant	Song	Result
Marie-Mai	Charlotte Cardin-Goyer	"J'attends"	Finalist
Jean-Pierre Ferland	Étienne Cotton	"Partir au vent"	Finalist
Marc Dupré	Jérôme Couture	"Comme on attend le printemps"	Finalist
Ariane Moffat	Valérie Carpentier	"À fleur de peau"	Winner

=== Audiences ===
Season	Broadcasts	Audience (Market share)		
Season	Broadcasts	Premiere	Finale	Average
1	20 January 2013 – 14 April 2013	2,593,000 (59%),		
