= List of Canadian Hot 100 number-one singles of 2015 =

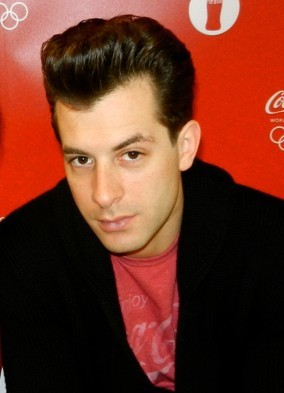
"Uptown Funk" by Mark Ronson (pictured) featuring Bruno Mars spent fifteen weeks at number one, becoming the second longest-running number-one single since the chart's inception in 2007. It later ranked as the best-performing single of the year.

This is a list of the Canadian Hot 100 number-one singles of 2015. The Canadian Hot 100 is a chart that ranks the best-performing singles of Canada. Its data, published by Billboard magazine and compiled by Nielsen SoundScan, is based collectively on each single's weekly physical and digital sales, as well as airplay and streaming.

Note that Billboard publishes charts with an issue date approximately 7–10 days in advance.

== Chart history ==
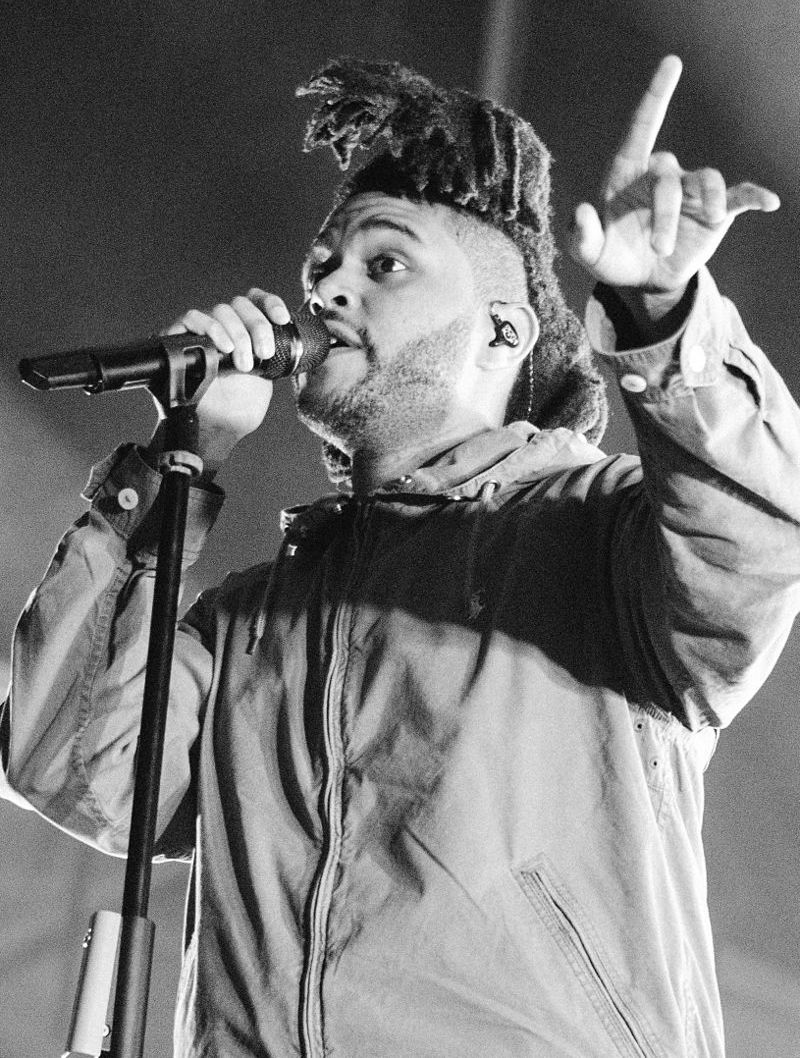
Canadian singer The Weeknd (pictured) earned his first and second number-one singles with "Can't Feel My Face" and "The Hills".

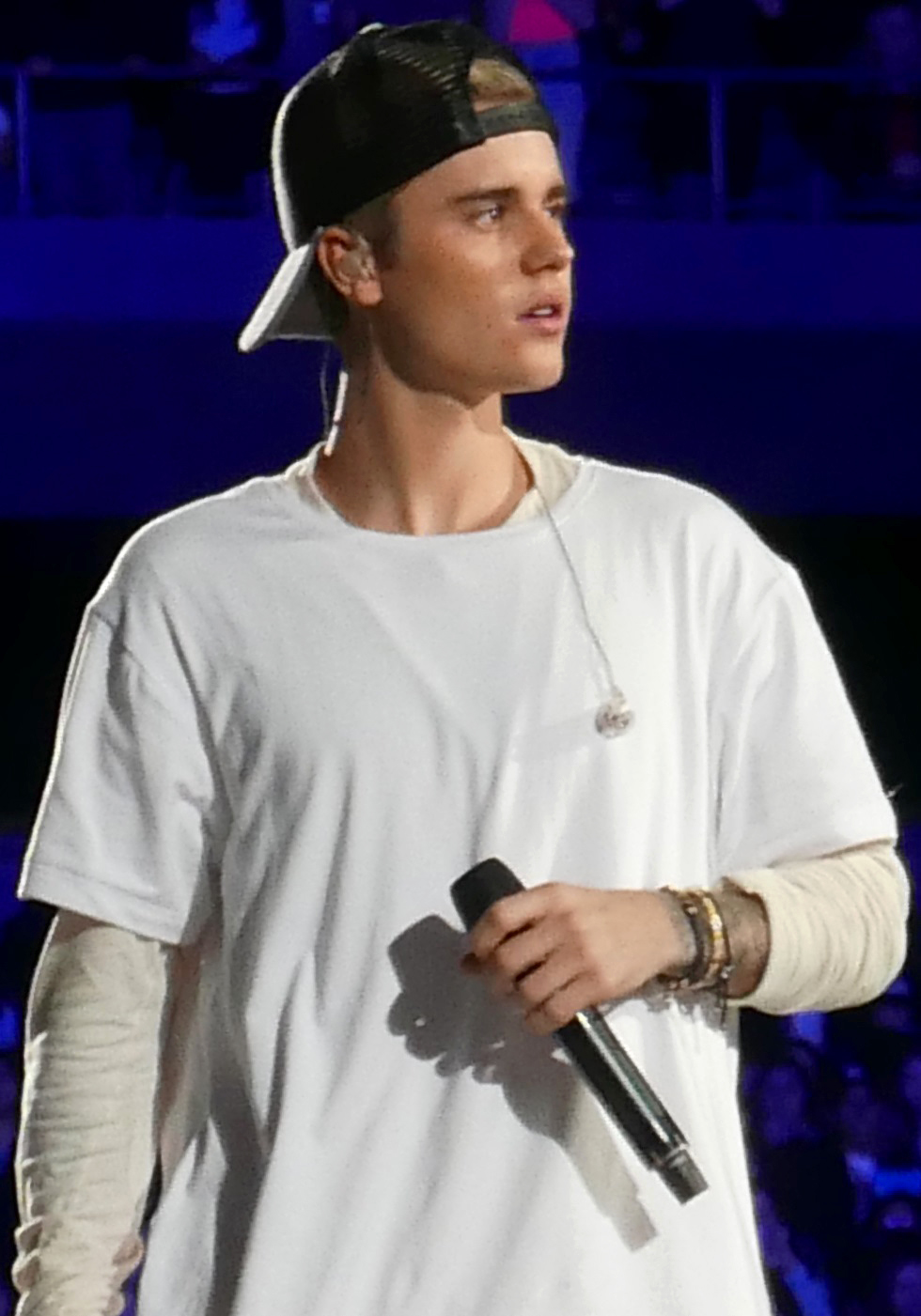
Justin Bieber (pictured)'s "What Do You Mean?" debuted at number one, becoming the fourteenth song to do so.

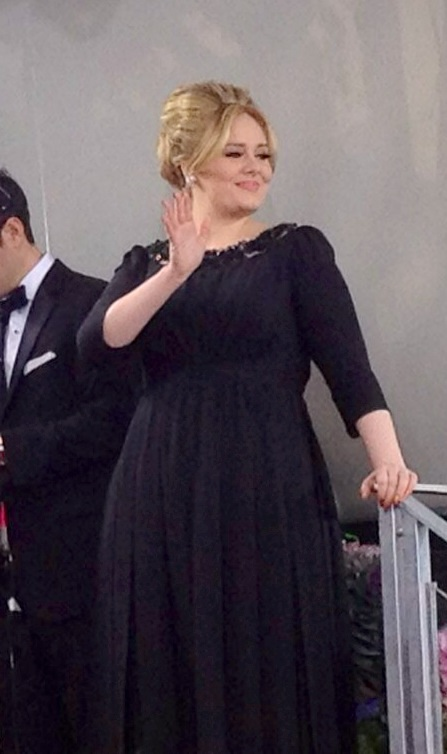
Adele (pictured)'s "Hello" debuted at number one, becoming the fifteenth song to do so.

Key
†	Indicates best-performing single of 2015

No.	Issue date	Song	Artist(s)	Ref.
95	January 3	"Blank Space"	Taylor Swift	
96	January 10	"Uptown Funk" †	Mark Ronson featuring Bruno Mars	
96	January 17	"Uptown Funk" †	Mark Ronson featuring Bruno Mars	
96	January 24	"Uptown Funk" †	Mark Ronson featuring Bruno Mars	
96	January 31	"Uptown Funk" †	Mark Ronson featuring Bruno Mars	
96	February 7	"Uptown Funk" †	Mark Ronson featuring Bruno Mars	
96	February 14	"Uptown Funk" †	Mark Ronson featuring Bruno Mars	
96	February 21	"Uptown Funk" †	Mark Ronson featuring Bruno Mars	
96	February 28	"Uptown Funk" †	Mark Ronson featuring Bruno Mars	
96	March 7	"Uptown Funk" †	Mark Ronson featuring Bruno Mars	
96	March 14	"Uptown Funk" †	Mark Ronson featuring Bruno Mars	
96	March 21	"Uptown Funk" †	Mark Ronson featuring Bruno Mars	
96	March 28	"Uptown Funk" †	Mark Ronson featuring Bruno Mars	
96	April 4	"Uptown Funk" †	Mark Ronson featuring Bruno Mars	
96	April 11	"Uptown Funk" †	Mark Ronson featuring Bruno Mars	
96	April 18	"Uptown Funk" †	Mark Ronson featuring Bruno Mars	
97	April 25	"See You Again"	Wiz Khalifa featuring Charlie Puth	
97	May 2	"See You Again"	Wiz Khalifa featuring Charlie Puth	
97	May 9	"See You Again"	Wiz Khalifa featuring Charlie Puth	
97	May 16	"See You Again"	Wiz Khalifa featuring Charlie Puth	
97	May 23	"See You Again"	Wiz Khalifa featuring Charlie Puth	
97	May 30	"See You Again"	Wiz Khalifa featuring Charlie Puth	
98	June 6	"Bad Blood"	Taylor Swift featuring Kendrick Lamar	
re	June 13	"See You Again"	Wiz Khalifa featuring Charlie Puth	
re	June 20	"See You Again"	Wiz Khalifa featuring Charlie Puth	
99	June 27	"Cheerleader"	Omi	
99	July 4	"Cheerleader"	Omi	
99	July 11	"Cheerleader"	Omi	
99	July 18	"Cheerleader"	Omi	
99	July 25	"Cheerleader"	Omi	
99	August 1	"Cheerleader"	Omi	
99	August 8	"Cheerleader"	Omi	
99	August 15	"Cheerleader"	Omi	
99	August 22	"Cheerleader"	Omi	
99	August 29	"Cheerleader"	Omi	
99	September 5	"Cheerleader"	Omi	
100	September 12	"Can't Feel My Face"	The Weeknd	
101	September 19	"What Do You Mean?"	Justin Bieber	
101	September 26	"What Do You Mean?"	Justin Bieber	
101	October 3	"What Do You Mean?"	Justin Bieber	
101	October 10	"What Do You Mean?"	Justin Bieber	
101	October 17	"What Do You Mean?"	Justin Bieber	
101	October 24	"What Do You Mean?"	Justin Bieber	
102	October 31	"The Hills"	The Weeknd	
re	November 7	"What Do You Mean?"	Justin Bieber	
103	November 14	"Hello"	Adele	
103	November 21	"Hello"	Adele	
103	November 28	"Hello"	Adele	
103	December 5	"Hello"	Adele	
103	December 12	"Hello"	Adele	
103	December 19	"Hello"	Adele	
103	December 26	"Hello"	Adele	

== See also ==
- List of number-one albums of 2015 (Canada)
