= Bad Blood (Taylor Swift song) =

2015 single by Taylor Swift featuring Kendrick Lamar

- Kendrick Lamar remix cover art

Single by Taylor Swift featuring Kendrick Lamar

from the album 1989
- Released: May 17, 2015
- Studio: MXM (Stockholm); Conway Recording (Los Angeles)
- Genre: Pop
- Length: 3:31
- Label: Big Machine
- Songwriters: Taylor Swift; Max Martin; Shellback; Kendrick Duckworth (Note: Remix only)
- Producers: Max Martin; Shellback; Ilya

Taylor Swift singles chronology
"Style" (2015)	"Bad Blood" (2015)	"Wildest Dreams" (2015)

Kendrick Lamar singles chronology
"King Kunta" (2015)	"Bad Blood" (2015)	"Alright" (2015)

Music video
- "Bad Blood" on YouTube

"Bad Blood" is a song by the American singer-songwriter Taylor Swift from her fifth studio album, 1989 (2014). She wrote the song with the Swedish producers Max Martin and Shellback. It is a pop song using keyboards and hip-hop-inspired drum beats, and the lyrics are about betrayal by a close friend. A remix featuring the American rapper Kendrick Lamar, with additional lyrics by Lamar and production by the Swedish musician Ilya, was released to radio as 1989's fourth single on May 17, 2015, by Big Machine and Republic Records.

Music critics gave the album version of "Bad Blood" mixed reviews; some described it as catchy and engaging, but others criticized the production as bland and the lyrics repetitive. The remix version received somewhat more positive comments for Lamar's verses, featured among the best songs of 2015 on lists by NME and PopMatters, and received a Grammy nomination for Best Pop Duo/Group Performance. Critics have retrospectively considered "Bad Blood" one of Swift's worst songs. The single reached number one and received multi-platinum certifications in Australia, Canada, and the United States.

Directed by Joseph Kahn and produced by Swift, the music video for "Bad Blood" features an ensemble cast consisting of female singers, actresses, and models. Having a production that resembles sci-fi and action movies, it won the Grammy Award for Best Music Video and MTV Video Music Awards for the Video of the Year and Best Collaboration. Swift performed "Bad Blood" on the 1989 World Tour (2015), the Reputation Stadium Tour (2018), and the Eras Tour (2023–2024). Following a 2019 dispute regarding the ownership of Swift's back catalog, she re-recorded both the album version and the Lamar remix for her 2023 re-recorded album 1989 (Taylor's Version); both re-recordings are subtitled "Taylor's Version".

== Background and production ==
Taylor Swift had identified as a country musician, up until her fourth studio album, Red, which was released on October 22, 2012. Red's eclectic pop and rock styles beyond the country stylings of Swift's past albums led to critics questioning her country-music identity. Swift began writing songs for her fifth studio album in mid-2013 while touring. She was inspired by 1980s synth-pop to create her fifth studio album, 1989, which she described as her first "official pop album" and named after her birth year. The album makes extensive use of synthesizers, programmed drum machines, and electronic and dance stylings, a stark contrast to the acoustic arrangements of her country-styled albums.

Swift and Max Martin served as executive producers of 1989. On the album's standard edition, Martin and Shellback produced 7 out of 13 songs, including "Bad Blood". Swift wrote "Bad Blood" with Martin and Shellback, who both programmed the track and played electronic keyboards on it. The song was recorded by Sam Holland at Conway Recording Studios in Los Angeles, and by Michael Ilbert at MXM Studios in Stockholm, Sweden. The song was mixed by Serban Ghenea at Mixstar Studios in Virginia Beach, Virginia, and mastered by Tom Coyne at Sterling Sound Studio in New York.

== Music and lyrics ==
"Bad Blood"
The album version of "Bad Blood" features stomping drums and pulsing keyboards.

"Bad Blood" is a pop song with prominent hip-hop stylings. It begins with Swift's multitracked vocals singing the refrain a cappella, and progresses into an arrangement composed of keyboard tones, synth arpeggiators, hip-hop beats, and a pulsing bassline. The rhythm is accentuated by eighth-note acoustic guitar strums and tambourine.

According to Jon Caramanica of The New York Times, the "booming drums" of the song evoked the "Billy Squier ones often sampled in hip-hop". Jem Aswad of Billboard described the production as "simplistic" and compared it to Gwen Stefani's "Hollaback Girl" (2005), The Observer's Kitty Empire likened the "stark beats" to the music of Charli XCX, and NME's Matthew Horton deemed the song a "bitter stomp" that evokes Beastie Boys. The lyrics portray resentment and anger that result from betrayal, through lyrics such as, "These kinda wounds, they last and they last," and "Band-aids don't fix bullet holes/ You say sorry just for show." The refrain consists of repeated phrases, "Now we got bad blood/ You know it used to be mad love." Jon Pareles described Swift's vocals throughout the refrain as tense, while Consequence of Sound's Sasha Geffen wrote that she sang "through gritted teeth".

Some critics interpreted "Bad Blood" to be about a lost love. In an interview for the September 2014 cover issue for Rolling Stone, Swift said that the song was about a fellow female artist whom she had thought of as a close friend; she felt betrayed after this person attempted to "sabotage an entire arena tour" by "[hiring] a bunch of people out from under [her]". She wanted to make it clear that it was about losing a friend and not a lover because she "knew people would immediately be going in one direction", referring to how the audience interpreted her songs in association with her love life. The media speculated the subject to be Katy Perry, who had a publicized fallout with Swift after being friends for several years. In another interview for GQ in October 2015, Swift reaffirmed the theme of lost friendship and responded to the speculation: "I never said anything that would point a finger in the specific direction of one specific person." According to the journalist Chuck Klosterman, by clarifying the inspiration behind "Bad Blood" to divert the media from her love life without disclosing the subject, Swift "propagated the existence of a different rumor that offered the added value of making the song more interesting".

== Release and commercial performance ==
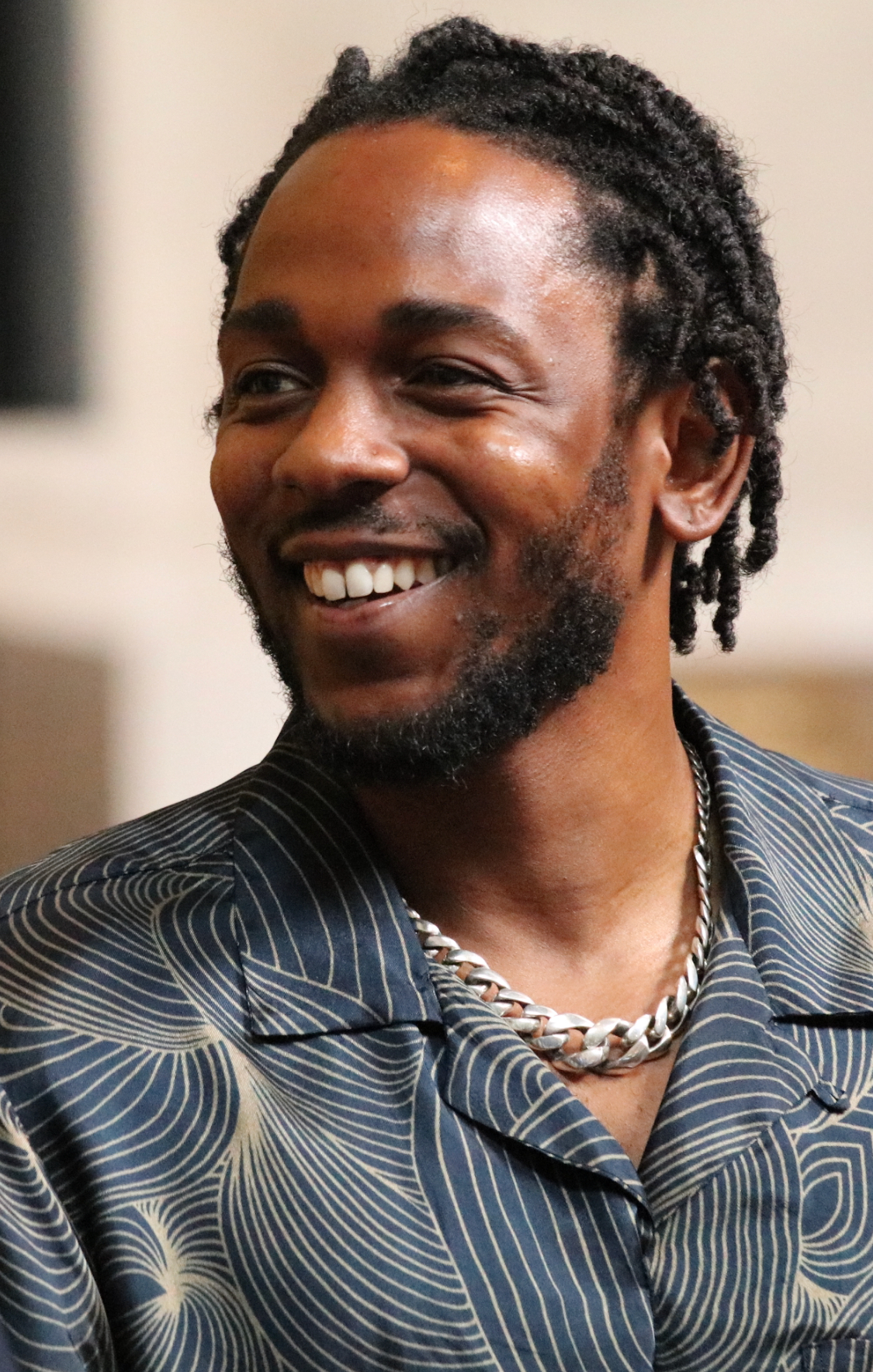
Kendrick Lamar featured and wrote his rap verses on the single release of "Bad Blood", which became his first number-one single in the United States.

After 1989 was released on October 27, 2014, "Bad Blood" first charted on the Billboard Hot 100 for two weeks in November 2014 and January 2015, reaching number 78. In May 2015, a remix version featuring the rapper Kendrick Lamar was released as the fourth single to promote 1989. According to Lamar, Swift reached out to him personally and he agreed because they had been fond of each other's music. On the remix, Lamar raps two verses written by himself, and Ilya contributed additional production, which incorporates a heavier percussive arrangement of trap and hip-hop beats, fluctuating hi-hats and clapping rhythms, and resonant kick drums. Lamar recalled that the collaboration with Swift went smoothly because "the vibe was right"; he finished his verses in a few takes during a studio session in Los Angeles. When Rolling Stone asked him in 2017 whether he was "taking sides in a pop beef", he responded that he was unaware of it.

Big Machine Records released the remix for digital download on May 17, 2015, the same day that the premiere of its music video took place at the Billboard Music Awards. In the United States, Big Machine and Republic Records sent "Bad Blood" to contemporary hit radio on May 19, and to rhythmic radio on June 9, 2015. Universal Music Group released the song to Italian radio on June 12, 2015. "Bad Blood" re-entered the Hot 100 at number 53 upon its single release and reached number one the following week, on the Billboard Hot 100 chart dated June 6, 2015. "Bad Blood" was the third single from 1989 to reach number one, after "Shake It Off" and "Blank Space"; it was Swift's fourth and Lamar's first career number-one Hot 100 single. After one week at number one, it charted at number two for the next five weeks.

On Billboard's airplay charts, "Bad Blood" reached number one on Pop Songs and Adult Pop Songs. On the Pop Songs chart, after it debuted at number 13 and rose to number 9 the following week, the single tied the record for the quickest timeline to enter the top 10. By reaching number one in five weeks, it registered the shortest duration to top the chart since Nelly's "Over and Over" (2004) featuring Tim McGraw, which spent three weeks before ascending to the top. In the week ending July 12, 2015, the single broke the record for the most single-week plays in the Pop Songs chart's 22-year history, surpassing Wiz Khalifa and Charlie Puth's "See You Again" (2015). According to Nielsen SoundScan, "Bad Blood" was the 10th-best-selling song of 2015 in the United States, selling 2.584 million digital copies. The Recording Industry Association of America certified the single six-times platinum for surpassing six million units based on sales and on-demand streams, and the track had sold 3.2 million digital copies in the United States by July 2019.

"Bad Blood" topped the charts in Australia, Canada, New Zealand, and Scotland. It peaked within the top five in South Africa, Lebanon, and the United Kingdom; and the top ten in Hungary, Finland, and Ireland. The single was certified multi-platinum in Australia (nine-times platinum), Brazil (double diamond), Canada (triple platinum), New Zealand (triple platinum), and the United Kingdom (double platinum). It was certified platinum in Austria, Norway, Portugal, and gold in Denmark, France, Germany, and Italy. In the United Kingdom, the single had sold 373,000 downloads as of July 2021.

== Critical reception ==
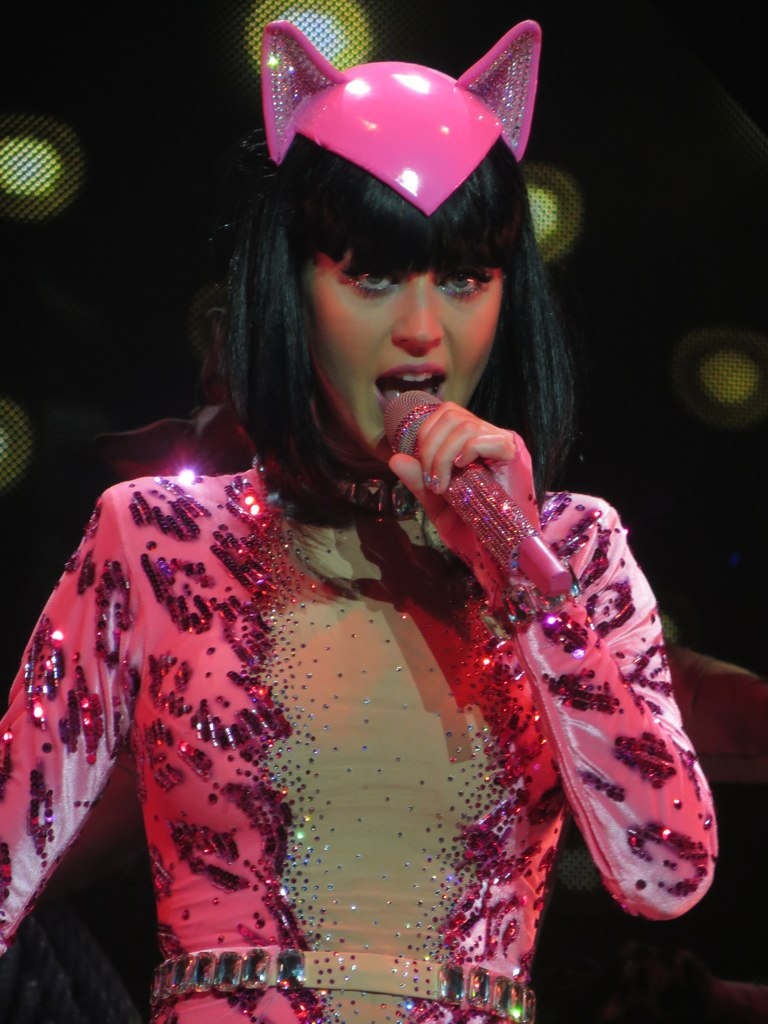
Music journalists and fans interpreted "Bad Blood" as a diss track targeting Katy Perry (pictured in 2014).

"Bad Blood" received mixed reviews, with many critics deeming it the weakest song on 1989. Mike Diver from Clash described it as "a litany of diary-page break-up clichés set to directionless thumps and fuzzes", while Jay Lustig from The Record criticized Swift's delivery as "merely petulant, howling" and the beats as "repetitive". Several critics found the song neither engaging nor distinctive; the musicologist James E. Perone wrote that listeners would not be able to tell if "Bad Blood" was a "Taylor Swift song" because of its composition and vocals. Andrew Unterberger from Spin said that the lyrics were absent of the specificity that had characterized Swift's previous songs, Mikael Wood from the Los Angeles Times thought that its beat was reminiscent of that on Katy Perry's "Roar" (2013), and Lindsay Zoladz from Vulture considered "Bad Blood" an "ironic" song to be taken as a Perry diss track because other album tracks had "the faceless mall-pop" that was "no better" than the worst songs on Perry's album Prism (2013). Retrospective rankings by Rolling Stone's Rob Sheffield and Paste's Jane Song both ranked it as the worst song Swift had released.

In more positive reviews, several critics considered "Bad Blood" one of the highlights of 1989. The Quietus's Amy Pettifier said that it was one of the album tracks "crammed with merit" and called it "all sass and bile", Entertainment Weekly's Adam Markovitz said that the track was a "potential [hit]" as a "chant-along fight song", and the Toronto Star's Ben Rayner praised it as a "proper keeper on delivery" with its "cheerleader-ish shout-along". Consequence of Sound's Sasha Geffen and Drowned in Sound's Robert Leedham found the song to showcase a defiant attitude; the former attributed this to the production elements of hip-hop beats and deep bassline: "they let her slice out her words with real anger, not just passive regret", and the latter wrote that it recalled "iconic hardcore bands you've probably never heard of". Revisiting "Bad Blood" in 2023, Amara Sorosiak of American Songwriter regarded it as a career-defining single for Swift, writing that it exemplified the "shout-able, catchy pop" of her pop albums and solidified her "bold image" as an artist in the 2010s decade. For Vulture's Nate Jones, the song represented the peak of Swift's "Max Martin era", with its melody being expertly crafted but lyrics absent of "humanity".

Reviewing the remix version featuring Lamar, August Brown of the Los Angeles Times expressed confusion towards the rapper's appearance and contended that it was a move to garner a mainstream audience after his "epic" album To Pimp a Butterfly (2015). Brown said that while Lamar's delivery was "not at his most fiery", it proved his artistic versatility "from difficult free jazz [...] to the tightest, glossiest pop out there". Slate's Chris Molanphy praised Ilya's production for highlighting the refrain's musical highlights and lauded Lamar's "tongue-tripping turns of phrase", but he contended that the rapper was in "accessible, maximum-pop mode" while he was supposed to be held "to a higher standard". Alexis Petridis of The Guardian dubbed the single "a masterstroke" with "potent and effective" verses from Lamar and an "even more anthemic" chorus compared to the album version. "Bad Blood" featuring Lamar was listed among the best songs of 2015 by NME (11th) and PopMatters (6th).

== Music video ==
=== Development and synopsis ===
Catastrophe's (played by Swift) team in front of an explosion in the music video for "Bad Blood", which was compared to action movies by media publications

The music video of "Bad Blood" was directed by Joseph Kahn and produced by Swift. Filmed in Los Angeles on April 12, 2015, the video premiered on May 17, 2015, at the Billboard Music Awards. The video features Swift and Lamar alongside an ensemble cast consisting of female singers, actresses, and fashion models who were dubbed by the media as Swift's "squad". Each member of the cast chose their character's name. The cast include, in order of appearance: Catastrophe (Swift), Arsyn (Selena Gomez), Welvin da Great (Lamar), Lucky Fiori (Lena Dunham), the Trinity (Hailee Steinfeld), Dilemma (Serayah), Slay-Z (Gigi Hadid), Destructa X (Ellie Goulding), Homeslice (Martha Hunt), Mother Chucker (Cara Delevingne), Cut Throat (Zendaya), The Crimson Curse (Hayley Williams), Frostbyte (Lily Aldridge), Knockout (Karlie Kloss), Domino (Jessica Alba), Justice (Mariska Hargitay), Luna (Ellen Pompeo), and Headmistress (Cindy Crawford).

Set in a fictional London, the video starts with Catastrophe and her partner, Arsyn, fighting off a group of men in a corporate office for a mysterious briefcase. When all of the men are defeated, Arsyn steals the briefcase from Catastrophe's hand and kicks her out of a window, making her fall onto a car. The song then begins, and Catastrophe and her female squad train to exact their revenge. The video concludes with Catastrophe's and Arsyn's two teams facing each other, walking in slow motion as an explosion goes off in the background, blotting out the London skyline.

=== Reception ===
"Bad Blood" broke Vevo's 24-hour viewing record by accumulating 20.1 million views in its first day of release. Media publications compared the video's production to that of blockbuster movies (Note: Attributed to D'Addario, Stereogum's Tom Breihan, and Complex's Constant Gardner) and opined that it resembled action and sci-fi films and series such as Sin City, RoboCop, Tron, Kill Bill, and Mad Max: Fury Road. (Note: Attributed to Time's Daniel D'Addario, Entertainment Weekly's Megan Daley, The A.V. Club's Kayla Kumari Upadhyaya, Slate's Sharan Shetty, The Atlantic's Spencer Kornhaber, and Billboard's Erin Strecker) Erin Strecker of Billboard commented that there were resemblances to the videos of Britney Spears's "Toxic" and "Womanizer", which were both directed by Kahn. Esquire's Matt Miller said that the video depicted a "sci-fi Taylor", and Rolling Stone described it as "futuristic neo-noir". In Consequence, Mary Siroky deemed it the most memorable music video of the 1989 singles and called it "The Avengers of music videos". Spencer Kornhaber of The Atlantic thought otherwise that it did not succeed on a cinematic level because "the editing becomes so hectic that even the barest bones story here is indiscernible".

Some journalists analyzed the video with regards to Swift's celebrity. According to Time's Daniel D'Addario, with "Bad Blood" and the music videos for other 1989 singles, Swift abandoned the "appropriately lo-fi" videos of her country songs to use videos "as a tool to explore various sides of her personality, and create others", accompanying her artistic reinvention to pop music. D'Addario wrote that Swift followed Madonna by "[paring] visual aesthetics with entirely unrelated songs, giving the viewer a whole new thing to talk about", and thus succeeded in promoting herself as "2015's all-around-perfect pop star". In The Washington Post, Emily Yahr commented that by enlisting high-profile celebrities for the video, Swift proved that she was "the most powerful women in show business" who had "access, status and power" to mobilize a big number of celebrities to go against her adversaries.

Several critics commented on the video in the context of feminism. Websites like The Daily Beast and Deadspin criticized the "supposed hypocrisy", citing the alleged feud with Katy Perry. The "squad" was a point of contention: Kornhaber applauded the video as an imagining of an all-female action movie, but Jennifer Gannon from The Irish Times considered Swift's "squad" as a means to build a cult of personality rather than embody female empowerment, an idea corroborated by Eve Barlow of The Times, who described it as "an exclusive, Mean Girls-style clique of perfect, stalk-limbed and shiny-haired clones". Judy L. Isaksen and Nahed Eltantawy, scholars in popular culture and journalism, and Hannelore Roth, a scholar in literature, argued that Swift's idea of feminism was only applicable to famous and wealthy women. According to Isaksen and Eltantawy, fans of Swift were critical of the supposed "embodiment of privilege" despite her efforts to promote a postfeminist "girlfriend culture". Roth added that by casting Lamar as the ringleader behind the female squad, the video was "just a violent, pre-modern copy of the patriarchal structures at the office".

== Awards and nominations ==
At the 2015 MTV Video Music Awards, "Bad Blood" was nominated in eight categories and won in two: Video of the Year and Best Collaboration; it was Swift's first Video of the Year win. The song was nominated for Best Pop Duo/Group Performance and won Best Music Video at the 58th Annual Grammy Awards in 2016. It was recognized as one of the biggest songs of the year at both the ASCAP Pop Music Awards by the American Society of Composers, Authors and Publishers (ASCAP) and the 64th Annual BMI Pop Awards by Broadcast Music, Inc.

"Bad Blood" won fan-voted categories at the Teen Choice Awards (Choice Music – Collaboration), the MTV Europe Music Awards (Best Song), and the Radio Disney Music Awards (Song of the Year, Best Breakup Song). It received nominations at the American Music Awards, the People's Choice Awards, the Nickelodeon Kids' Choice Awards, and the iHeartRadio Music Awards. The music video additionally won accolades at Mexico's Telehit Awards (Video of the Year), the Philippines' Myx Music Award (Favorite International Video), and France's NRJ Music Award (Video of the Year).

== Live performances and other use ==
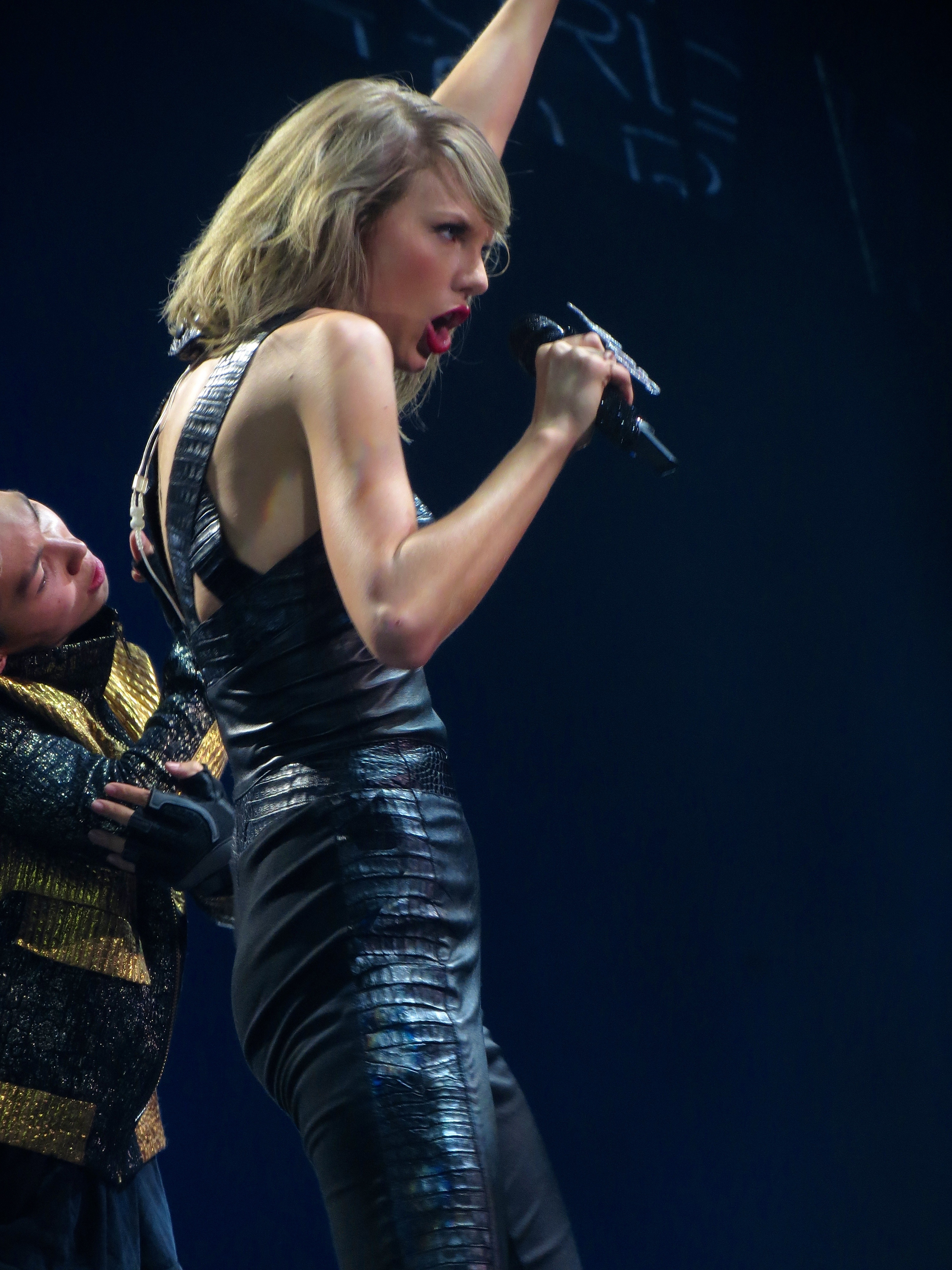
Swift performing "Bad Blood" on the 1989 World Tour in 2015

At the 2015 MTV Video Music Awards on August 30, Swift and Nicki Minaj jointly performed "Bad Blood" and "The Night Is Still Young". Swift also sang the song during her concerts at the United States Grand Prix on October 22, 2016, and the pre-Super Bowl event Super Saturday Night on February 4, 2017.

On the 1989 World Tour (2015), Swift performed "Bad Blood" wearing a black leather suit as dancers performed acrobatics behind her. She included the song in the set list of the Reputation Stadium Tour (2018), where she performed it in a mash-up with "Should've Said No" (2008), which incorporated a country-influenced guitar riff. According to The Ringer's Nora Princiotti, the mash-up improved one of Swift's weakest songs ("Bad Blood") by tweaking its arrangement and using the melody of an "early classic" ("Should've Said No"). On the Eras Tour (2023–2024), Swift performed "Bad Blood" as the screen showed a house on fire and the venue lit up in red flames.

"Bad Blood" was parodied in various other mediums. The comedians Cariad Lloyd and Jenny Bede's parody of "Bad Blood" called for withdrawal of taxation of women's sanitary products in the United Kingdom. The animated web series How It Should Have Ended in September 2015 created a parody called "Bat Blood", which satirizes the marketing of the 2016 film Batman v Superman: Dawn of Justice. Kevin McDevitt, a writer and filmmaker, made a parody titled "Good Blood" to encourage viewers become donors for the bone marrow transplant via the non-profit National Marrow Donor Program. The music video was parodied in the sitcom Great News, featuring a "squad" consisting of Tina Fey and Nicole Richie, which aired in October 2017.

The rock band Drenge and the singer-songwriter Alessia Cara covered the song for BBC Radio 1's live sessions in June and July 2015, and the rapper-singer Drake used a snippet of it in an advertisement for Apple Music in November 2016. Anthony Vincent, a YouTuber and musician, covered "Bad Blood" to make it sound like it had been sung by 19 diverse acts, including the Rolling Stones, TLC, Cyndi Lauper, Barney & Friends, and Sepultura.

== Ryan Adams cover ==
Ryan Adams, an American singer-songwriter, covered "Bad Blood" as part of his track-by-track interpretation of Swift's 1989. Adams said that Swift's 1989 helped him cope with emotional hardships and that he wanted to interpret the songs from his perspective "like it was Bruce Springsteen's Nebraska". His version of "Bad Blood" is an alt-country and folk-pop song that uses acoustic guitar strums and live drums. Prior to his cover album's release, Adams previewed "Bad Blood" on Apple Music's Beats 1 radio and then released it as a single, on September 17, 2015.

Andrew Unterberger from Spin preferred Adams's version to Swift's, writing that it "[strips the] overbearing hyperactivity ... [and removes the] sneering obnoxiousness". Annie Zaleski of The A.V. Club complimented the "[watercolor]-hued strings and well-placed percussion thumps". In less enthusiastic reviews, Billboard's Chris Payne deemed it the worst cover on Adams's 1989 because he thought it failed to highlight Swift's songwriting strengths, and Vulture's Jillian Mapes thought that by switching the "sinister beats" with "coffeehouse-singer [...] strumming and a jangly counter-melody in the chorus", Adams turned "Bad Blood" from a sonically distinctive track into an unoriginal song. His cover peaked at number 25 on the Ultratop chart of Belgian Wallonia and number 36 on Billboard's Rock Airplay chart.

== Credits and personnel ==
Adapted from the liner notes of 1989 and Tidal

- Taylor Swift – vocals, backing vocals, songwriter
- Kendrick Lamar – featured vocals, backing vocals, songwriter
- Max Martin – producer, songwriter, programmer, keyboards, piano
- Shellback – backing vocals, producer, songwriter, programmer, acoustic guitar, bass guitar, keyboards, drums, percussion, sounds (stomps and knees)
- Ilya – backing vocals, producer, programmer, recording engineer
- Michael Ilbert – recording engineer
- Sam Holland – recording engineer
- Ben Sedano – assistant recording engineer
- Cory Bice – assistant recording engineer
- Peter Carlsson – Pro Tools engineer
- Serban Ghenea – mixing engineer
- John Hanes – mixer
- Tom Coyne – mastering engineer

== Charts ==
=== Weekly charts ===
2015–2016 weekly chart performance
Chart (2015–2016)	Peak position
Australia (ARIA)	1
Austria (Ö3 Austria Top 40)	22
Belgium (Ultratop 50 Flanders)	26
Belgium (Ultratop 50 Wallonia)	26
Brazil (Billboard Brasil Hot 100)	81
Canada Hot 100 (Billboard)	1
Canada AC (Billboard)	1
Canada CHR/Top 40 (Billboard)	1
Canada Hot AC (Billboard)	1
Czech Republic Airplay (ČNS IFPI)	29
Denmark Airplay (Tracklisten)	7
Euro Digital Song Sales (Billboard)	2
Finland Download (Latauslista)	5
France (SNEP)	14
France Airplay (SNEP)	18
Germany (GfK)	29
Germany Airplay (BVMI)	18
Greece Digital Song Sales (Billboard)	2
Hong Kong (HKRIA)	30
Hungary (Single Top 40)	10
Ireland (IRMA)	8
Italy (FIMI)	93
Japan Hot 100 (Billboard)	20
Japan Adult Contemporary (Billboard)	69
Lebanon (Lebanese Top 20)	4
Mexico Airplay (Billboard)	16
Netherlands (Dutch Top 40)	33
New Zealand (Recorded Music NZ)	1
New Zealand (Recorded Music NZ) Solo version	40
Scottish Singles Sales (Official Charts)	1
Slovakia Airplay (ČNS IFPI)	65
South Africa Airplay (EMA)	2
Switzerland (Schweizer Hitparade)	28
UK Singles (Official Charts)	4
US Billboard Hot 100	1
US Adult Contemporary (Billboard) Solo version	9
US Adult Pop Airplay (Billboard) Solo version	1
US Dance Airplay (Billboard)	5
US Dance Club Songs (Billboard)	37
US Pop Airplay (Billboard)	1
US Rhythmic Airplay (Billboard)	6
Venezuela (Record Report)	4

2023 weekly chart performance
Chart (2023)	Peak position
Global 200 (Billboard)	198
Portugal (AFP)	28
Singapore (RIAS)	13

=== Year-end charts ===
2015 year-end charts
Chart (2015)	Position
Australia (ARIA)	18
Canada (Canadian Hot 100)	11
Hungary (Single Top 40)	91
UK Singles (Official Charts Company)	88
US Billboard Hot 100	15
US Adult Contemporary (Billboard)	20
US Adult Pop Songs (Billboard)	11
US Dance/Mix Show Songs (Billboard)	28
US Pop Songs (Billboard)	4
US Rhythmic (Billboard)	33

2016 year-end chart
Chart (2016)	Position
Brazil (Brasil Hot 100)	60

== Certifications ==
Certifications
Region	Certification	Certified units/sales
Australia (ARIA)	9× Platinum	630,000^{‡}
Austria (IFPI Austria)	Platinum	30,000^{‡}
Brazil (Pro-Música Brasil)	2× Diamond	500,000^{‡}
Canada (Music Canada)	3× Platinum	240,000^{*}
Denmark (IFPI Danmark)	Gold	45,000^{‡}
France (SNEP)	Gold	100,000^{‡}
Germany (BVMI)	Gold	200,000^{‡}
Italy (FIMI)	Gold	50,000^{‡}
New Zealand (RMNZ)	3× Platinum	90,000^{‡}
Norway (IFPI Norway)	Platinum	60,000^{‡}
Portugal (AFP)	Platinum	10,000^{‡}
Spain (Promusicae)	Gold	30,000^{‡}
United Kingdom (BPI)	2× Platinum	1,200,000^{‡}
United States (RIAA)	6× Platinum	6,000,000^{‡}
^{*} Sales figures based on certification alone.^{‡} Sales+streaming figures based on certification alone.

== Release history ==
Release dates and formats
Region	Date	Format(s)	Version	Label(s)	Ref.
Various	May 17, 2015	Digital download; streaming	Remix featuring Kendrick Lamar	Big Machine	
United States	May 19, 2015	Contemporary hit radio	Remix featuring Kendrick Lamar	Big Machine; Republic	
United States	June 9, 2015	Rhythmic radio	Remix featuring Kendrick Lamar	Republic	
Italy	June 12, 2015	Radio airplay	Remix featuring Kendrick Lamar	Universal	
Italy	June 12, 2015	Radio airplay	Original	Universal	

== "Bad Blood (Taylor's Version)" ==
"Bad Blood (Taylor's Version)"

Song by Taylor Swift featuring Kendrick Lamar

from the album 1989 (Taylor's Version) (Deluxe)
- Released: October 27, 2023
- Studio: Prime Recording (Nashville)
- Length: 3:31; 3:20 (remix)
- Label: Republic
- Songwriters: Taylor Swift; Kendrick Duckworth; Max Martin; Shellback
- Producers: Taylor Swift; Christopher Rowe

Lyric video
- "Bad Blood (Taylor's Version)" on YouTube

Swift departed from Big Machine and signed a new contract with Republic Records in 2018. She began re-recording her first six studio albums in November 2020. The decision followed a 2019 dispute between Swift and the talent manager Scooter Braun, who acquired Big Machine Records, over the masters of Swift's albums that the label had released. By re-recording the albums, Swift had full ownership of the new masters, which enabled her to encourage licensing of her re-recorded songs for commercial use in hopes of substituting the Big Machine-owned masters. She denoted the re-recordings with a "Taylor's Version" subtitle.

The re-recording of "Bad Blood" is titled "Bad Blood (Taylor's Version)". A snippet of it featured in the 2022 animated film DC League of Super-Pets. Although Swift had not re-recorded 1989, she agreed to re-record "Bad Blood" for the film upon request from Season Kent, its music supervisor. The full re-recorded song is included as part of 1989 (Taylor's Version), which was released on October 27, 2023. The remix featuring Lamar was also re-recorded as the bonus track of the deluxe edition of 1989 (Taylor's Version). Swift expressed her gratitude towards Lamar on social media, saying that his participation in the re-recording was "surreal and bewildering".

=== Production and reception ===
Swift produced "Bad Blood (Taylor's Version)" with Christopher Rowe, who had produced her previous re-recordings. The track was programmed and edited by Derek Garten at Prime Recording in Nashville, and Swift's vocals were recorded by Rowe at Kitty Committee and Electric Lady Studios in New York. Musicians who contributed to the track included Mike Meadows (synth, acoustic guitar), Dan Burns (drums, synth bass, synth), Amos Heller (bass guitar), and Matt Billingslea (drums). Serban Ghenea mixed the song at MixStar Studios in Virginia Beach.

The arrangement of "Bad Blood (Taylor's Version)" remains identical to that of the original version. Some critics commented that there were subtle changes; Notion's Rachel Martin wrote that Swift made "some dialect tweaks" and sang "with more depth and emotion" in the bridge, which resulted in a more powerful conclusion, while The Music's Tione Zylstra said that her vocals were "angrier and bitter". Ed Power of the i described it as a "timeless diss track", and Mark Sutherland of Rolling Stone UK commented the track "remains astounding". Commenting on the re-recorded remix, Elizabeth Braaten of Paste praised Swift and Lamar as "a match made in radio heaven". Giving the track a negative review, Pitchfork's Shaad D'Souza said that it "sounds more basic, bratty, and boring than ever".

On the Billboard Hot 100, "Bad Blood (Taylor's Version)" debuted at number seven on the chart dated November 11, 2023, extending Swift's record for the most top-10 singles (49) among women. On the Billboard Global 200, it debuted at number six; with other 1989 (Taylor's Version) tracks, it helped Swift become the first artist to occupy the entire top six of the Global 200 chart simultaneously. The track also peaked in the top 10 on charts of Canada (7), New Zealand (10), and the Philippines. It was certified platinum in Australia and gold in Brazil.

=== Personnel ===
Adapted from the liner notes of 1989 (Taylor's Version)

- Taylor Swift – lead vocals, background vocals, songwriting, production
- Christopher Rowe – production, background vocals, vocal engineering
- Mike Meadows – synthesizer, acoustic guitar
- Dan Burns – drum programming, synth bass, synthesizer, additional engineering
- Matt Billingslea – drum programming, drums
- Amos Heller – bass guitar
- Derek Garten – programming, engineering, editing
- Ryan Smith – mastering
- Serban Ghenea – mixing
- Bryce Bordone – mix engineering
- Max Martin – songwriting
- Shellback – songwriting
- Kendrick Lamar – rap vocals, songwriting
- Ilya Salmanzadeh – background vocals

=== Charts ===
==== Weekly charts ====
Weekly chart performance for Taylor's version
Chart (2023–2024)	Peak position
Australia (ARIA)	52
Brazil Hot 100 (Billboard)	72
Canada Hot 100 (Billboard)	7
Global 200 (Billboard)	6
Greece International (IFPI)	46
Ireland (Billboard)	13
Malaysia International (RIM)	19
New Zealand (Recorded Music NZ)	10
Philippines (Billboard)	10
Sweden (Sverigetopplistan)	69
UAE (IFPI)	20
UK (Billboard)	13
UK Singles Downloads (Official Charts)	10
UK Singles Sales (OCC)	12
UK Streaming (OCC)	14
US Billboard Hot 100	7
US Adult Contemporary (Billboard)	24
Vietnam (Vietnam Hot 100)	54

==== Year-end charts ====
2024 year-end chart performance for Taylor's version
Chart (2024)	Position
US Adult Contemporary (Billboard)	41

=== Certifications ===
Certifications for Taylor's version
Region	Certification	Certified units/sales
Australia (ARIA)	Platinum	70,000^{‡}
Brazil (Pro-Música Brasil)	Gold	20,000^{‡}
New Zealand (RMNZ)	Gold	15,000^{‡}
United Kingdom (BPI)	Silver	200,000^{‡}
^{‡} Sales+streaming figures based on certification alone.

== See also ==
- List of number-one singles of 2015 (Australia)
- List of number-one singles from the 2010s (New Zealand)
- List of Canadian Hot 100 number-one singles of 2015
- List of Billboard Hot 100 number ones of 2015
- List of number-one digital songs of 2015 (US)
- List of Billboard Mainstream Top 40 number-one songs of 2015
- List of Scottish number-one singles of 2015
