= Gabrielle Shonk =

Canadian singer-songwriter

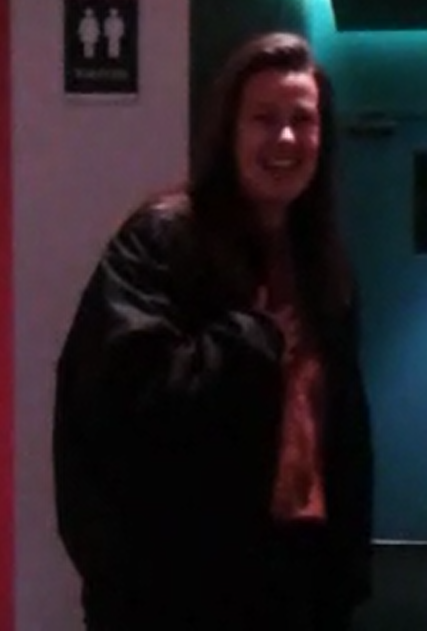

Background information
- Born: Providence, Rhode Island, U.S.
- Origin: Quebec City, Québec, Canada
- Occupation: Singer-songwriter

Gabrielle Shonk is a Canadian singer-songwriter. She received a Juno Award nomination for Adult Alternative Album of the Year at the Juno Awards of 2019 for her self-titled debut album.

The daughter of an American father and a Québécois mother, Shonk was born in Providence, Rhode Island and raised in Quebec City. Although fluently bilingual, she writes songs almost entirely in English, which she attributes to having been influenced primarily by anglophone rather than francophone music. Her album does, however, include three French-language songs co-written with Patrick Sauvageau.

She was a competitor on the second season of TVA's La Voix in 2014, but was eliminated from the competition after losing a duel round to Mathieu Lavoie. She released her debut album in late 2017. During the same period, she recorded a cover of Beyoncé's "Halo" for the soundtrack to the Cirque du Soleil show Crystal.

== Discography ==
- Gabrielle Shonk (2017)
- Across the Room (2023)
