= List of number-one digital songs of 2015 (U.S.) =

2015 highest-selling digital singles in the United States

The List of number-one digital songs of 2015 in the United States are based upon the highest-selling digital singles ranked in the Hot Digital Songs chart, published by Billboard magazine. The data are compiled by Nielsen SoundScan based on each single's weekly digital sales, which combines sales of different versions of a single for a summarized figure.

== Chart history ==
Key
| † | Indicates best-charting digital song of 2015 |

| Issue date | Song | Artist(s) | Weekly sales | Ref(s) |
|---|---|---|---|---|
| January 3 | "Uptown Funk" † | Mark Ronson featuring Bruno Mars | 288,000 | |
| January 10 | "Blank Space" | Taylor Swift | 503,000 | |
| January 17 | "Uptown Funk" † | Mark Ronson featuring Bruno Mars | 382,000 | |
| January 24 | "Uptown Funk" † | Mark Ronson featuring Bruno Mars | 341,000 | |
| January 31 | "Uptown Funk" † | Mark Ronson featuring Bruno Mars | 400,000 | |
| February 7 | "Uptown Funk" † | Mark Ronson featuring Bruno Mars | 341,000 | |
| February 14 | "Uptown Funk" † | Mark Ronson featuring Bruno Mars | 365,000 | |
| February 21 | "Uptown Funk" † | Mark Ronson featuring Bruno Mars | 319,000 | |
| February 28 | "Thinking Out Loud" | Ed Sheeran | 314,000 | |
| March 7 | "Uptown Funk" † | Mark Ronson featuring Bruno Mars | 257,000 | |
| March 14 | "Uptown Funk" † | Mark Ronson featuring Bruno Mars | 240,000 | |
| March 21 | "Uptown Funk" † | Mark Ronson featuring Bruno Mars | 210,000 | |
| March 28 | "Uptown Funk" † | Mark Ronson featuring Bruno Mars | 189,000 | |
| April 4 | "Uptown Funk" † | Mark Ronson featuring Bruno Mars | 187,000 | |
| April 11 | "Uptown Funk" † | Mark Ronson featuring Bruno Mars | 165,000 | |
| April 18 | "See You Again" | Wiz Khalifa featuring Charlie Puth | 168,000 | |
| April 25 | "See You Again" | Wiz Khalifa featuring Charlie Puth | 464,000 | |
| May 2 | "See You Again" | Wiz Khalifa featuring Charlie Puth | 375,000 | |
| May 9 | "See You Again" | Wiz Khalifa featuring Charlie Puth | 316,000 | |
| May 16 | "See You Again" | Wiz Khalifa featuring Charlie Puth | 285,000 | |
| May 23 | "See You Again" | Wiz Khalifa featuring Charlie Puth | 251,000 | |
| May 30 | "See You Again" | Wiz Khalifa featuring Charlie Puth | 229,000 | |
| June 6 | "Bad Blood" | Taylor Swift featuring Kendrick Lamar | 385,000 | |
| June 13 | "Bad Blood" | Taylor Swift featuring Kendrick Lamar | 241,000 | |
| June 20 | "Bad Blood" | Taylor Swift featuring Kendrick Lamar | 213,000 | |
| June 27 | "Bad Blood" | Taylor Swift featuring Kendrick Lamar | 206,000 | |
| July 4 | "Bad Blood" | Taylor Swift featuring Kendrick Lamar | 173,000 | |
| July 11 | "Good for You" | Selena Gomez featuring ASAP Rocky | 179,000 | |
| July 18 | "Cheerleader" | OMI | 170,000 | |
| July 25 | "Cheerleader" | OMI | 276,000 | |
| August 1 | "Cheerleader" | OMI | 172,000 | |
| August 8 | "Cheerleader" | OMI | 163,000 | |
| August 15 | "Can't Feel My Face" | The Weeknd | 148,000 | |
| August 22 | "Drag Me Down" | One Direction | 350,000 | |
| August 29 | "Can't Feel My Face" | The Weeknd | 119,000 | |
| September 5 | "Can't Feel My Face" | The Weeknd | 109,000 | |
| September 12 | "Locked Away" | R. City featuring Adam Levine | 92,000 | |
| September 19 | "What Do You Mean?" | Justin Bieber | 337,000 | |
| September 26 | "What Do You Mean?" | Justin Bieber | 159,000 | |
| October 3 | "What Do You Mean?" | Justin Bieber | 128,000 | |
| October 10 | "The Hills" | The Weeknd | 110,000 | |
| October 17 | "The Hills" | The Weeknd | 105,000 | |
| October 24 | "Hotline Bling" | Drake | 121,000 | |
| October 31 | "The Hills" | The Weeknd | 189,000 | |
| November 7 | "Hotline Bling" | Drake | 153,000 | |
| November 14 | "Hello" | Adele | 1,112,000 | |
| November 21 | "Hello" | Adele | 635,000 | |
| November 28 | "Hello" | Adele | 480,000 | |
| December 5 | "Hello" | Adele | 327,000 | |
| December 12 | "Sorry" | Justin Bieber | 178,000 | |
| December 19 | "Hello" | Adele | 233,000 | |
| December 26 | "Somebody to Love" | Jordan Smith | 164,000 | |

== See also ==
- 2015 in music
- List of Billboard Hot 100 number-one singles of 2015
