= Louis-Jean Cormier =

Canadian singer-songwriter (born 1980)

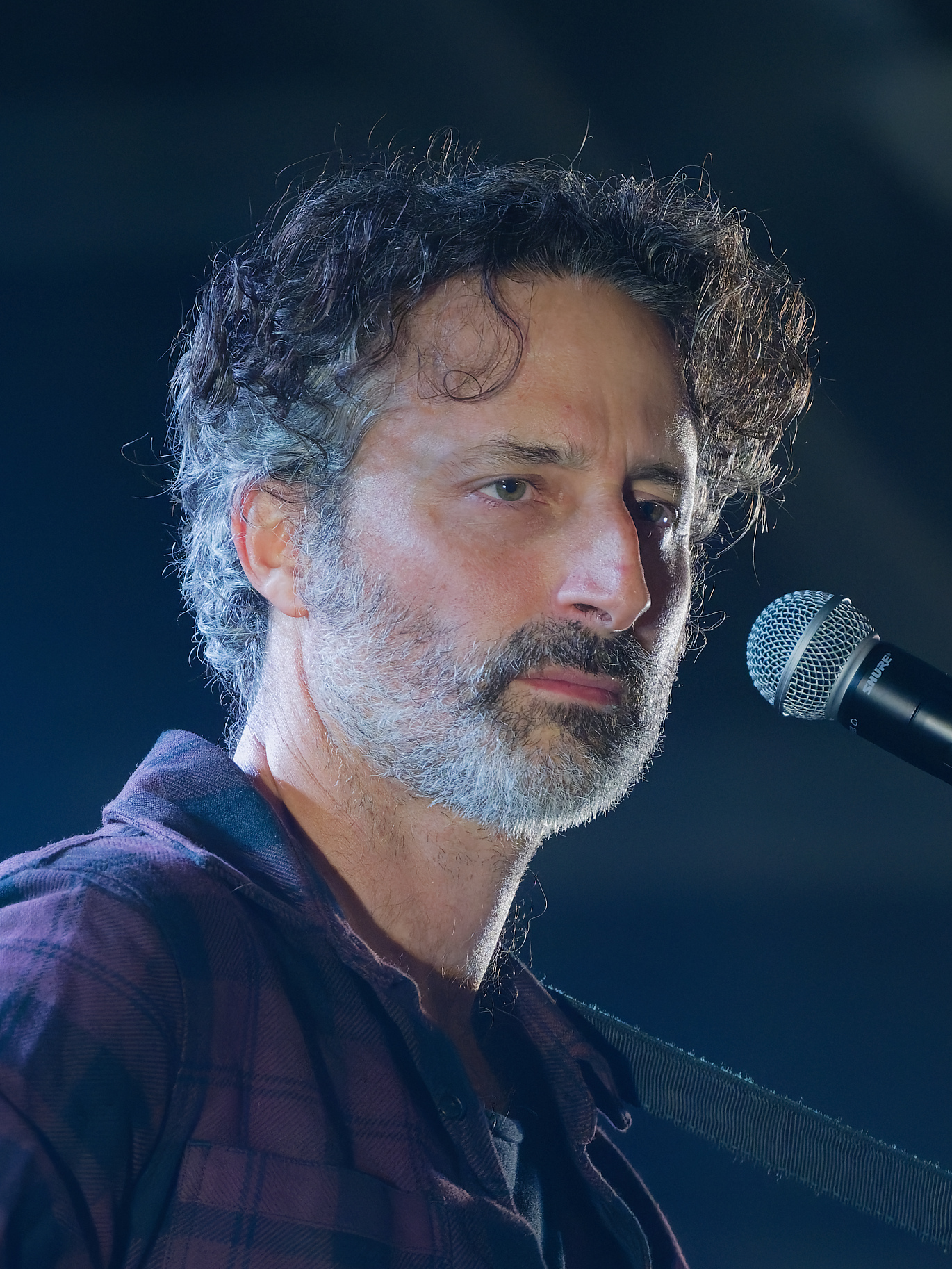
- Louis-Jean Cormier in Petite-Vallée, June 2026

Background information
- Born: May 26, 1980 (age 46)
- Origin: Sept-Îles, Quebec
- Genre: Indie rock
- Member of: Karkwa
- Website: louisjeancormier.com

Louis-Jean Cormier (born May 26, 1980, in Sept-Îles, Quebec) is a Canadian indie rock singer and songwriter. Vocalist and guitarist of the band Karkwa, since that band's first hiatus in 2012 he has also recorded and performed as a solo artist and was a judge on the second season of the television singing competition La Voix.

While Cormier was with Karkwa, the band's fourth album Les Chemins de verre won the 2010 Polaris Music Prize, being the first French-language work to win the award.

His 2012 album Le Treizième étage was a longlisted nominee for the 2013 Polaris Music Prize, and won the Juno Award for Francophone Album of the Year at the Juno Awards of 2013. His 2015 album Les Grandes artères was a longlisted nominee for the 2015 Polaris Music Prize.

In early 2015, a group of 125 Québécois musicians and media personalities recorded a charity rendition of Cormier's single "Tout le monde en même temps" as a promotion for a public relations campaign to protect the Société Radio-Canada from funding cuts.

In 2016, he appeared as a duet vocalist on "J'aurai cent ans", the debut single by singer-songwriter Beyries.

In 2018, Cormier collaborated with Serge Fiori on Seul ensemble, a theatrical show comprising new rerecordings of Fiori's classic songs. The show had its theatrical debut in 2019.

Le Ciel est au plancher was a Juno Award nominee for Francophone Album of the Year at the Juno Awards of 2022.

== Personal life ==
He has been in a relationship with broadcaster Rebecca Makonnen since the late 2010s. They keep their relationship relatively private, although she was the inspiration for some of the songs on his 2020 album Quand la nuit tombe.

He was previously married to Krista Simoneau, a music manager and agent with whom he still has an active professional relationship despite the end of their marriage.

== Discography ==
- Le Treizième étage (2012)
- Les Grandes artères (2015)
- Quand la nuit tombe (2020) (debuted at No. 24 in Canada)
- Le ciel est au plancher (2021)
