= 2019 in Canadian music =

The following musical events and releases happened in 2019 in Canada.

== Events ==
- March – Juno Awards of 2019
- April – East Coast Music Awards
- May – Prism Prize
- June – Preliminary longlist for the 2019 Polaris Music Prize was announced
- July – SOCAN Songwriting Prize
- July – Shortlist for the Polaris Music Prize was announced
- September – Haviah Mighty won the Polaris Music Prize for her album 13th Floor

== Albums released ==
=== A ===
- Absolutely Free, Geneva Freeport
- Alaskan Tapes, Millions
- Alaskan Tapes, Views from Sixteen Stories
- Jeremie Albino, Hard Time
- Altameda, Time Hasn't Changed You
- Anemone, Beat My Distance - February 15
- Laura Anglade, I've Got Just About Everything
- Aphrose, Element

=== B ===
- Badge Époque Ensemble, Badge Époque Ensemble
- Tim Baker, Forever Overhead - April 19
- Bedouin Soundclash, MASS - October 4
- Begonia, Fear
- Beppie, Song Soup
- Bibi Club, Bibi Club
- Big Brave, A Gaze Among Them
- Bleu Jeans Bleu, Perfecto
- Blue Moon Marquee, Bare Knuckles & Brawn
- Jacob Brodovsky, Sixteen Years
- Dean Brody, Black Sheep - April 26
- Chad Brownlee, Back in the Game - June 21
- Broken Social Scene, Let’s Try the After Vol. 1 - February 15
- Broken Social Scene, Let’s Try the After Vol. 2 - April 12
- Michael Jerome Browne, That's Where It's At
- Jon Bryant, Cult Classic - May 17
- Louise Burns, Portraits - November 8
- Burnstick, Kîyânaw
- Spencer Burton, The Mountain Man

=== C ===
- Daniel Caesar, Case Study 01 - June 28
- Alessia Cara, This Summer - September 6
- Celeigh Cardinal, Stories from a Downtown Apartment
- Lou-Adriane Cassidy, C'est la fin du monde à tous les jours
- Tanika Charles, The Gumption - May 10
- Clairmont the Second, Do You Drive? - January 31
- City and Colour, A Pill for Loneliness - October 4
- Bruce Cockburn, Crowing Ignites - September 20
- Leonard Cohen, Thanks for the Dance - November 22
- Charlotte Cornfield, The Shape of Your Name
- Corridor, Junior
- Les Cowboys Fringants, Les Antipodes
- Amelia Curran, Live at Massey Hall
- Isabelle Cyr, Brûle sur mes lèvres

=== D ===
- Mac DeMarco, Here Comes the Cowboy - May 10
- Del Barber, Easy Keeper
- Devours, Iconoclast
- Le Diable à Cinq, Debout!
- Digawolf, Yellowstone
- Céline Dion, Courage - November 15
- Julie Doiron with Mount Eerie, Lost Wisdom pt. 2 - November 8
- Drake, Care Package - August 2
- Liam Duncan, If I Don't Feel Better
- Marc Dupré, Rien ne se perd
- Durham County Poets, Hand Me Down Blues

=== E ===
- Efajemue, Motions and Methods
- Thompson Egbo-Egbo, The Offering
- Micah Erenberg, Love Is Gonna Find You
- André Ethier, Croak in the Weeds

=== F ===
- Lara Fabian, Papillon
- Stephen Fearing, The Unconquerable Past
- FET.NAT, Le Mal
- Dominique Fils-Aimé, Stay Tuned!
- Flore Laurentienne, Volume 1
- Florian Hoefner Trio, First Spring
- Flying Hórses, Reverie
- FouKi, ZayZay
- The Franklin Electric, In Your Head EP - August 2
- Fredz, Pas d'épines, pas de roses and Dans ma tête
- Debby Friday, Death Drive

=== G ===
- Sebastian Gaskin, Contradictions
- Hannah Georgas, Imprints
- Leela Gilday, North Star Calling
- The Glorious Sons, A War on Everything - September 13
- The Golden Seals, Something Isn't Happening
- Aaron Goodvin, V
- Jenn Grant, Love, Inevitable - May 31
- Great Lake Swimmers, The Waves, the Wake (Acoustic) - November 8

=== H ===
- Half Moon Run, A Blemish in the Great Light – November 1
- Haviah Mighty, 13th Floor
- Joshua Haulli, Aqqut
- Headstones, PeopleSkills – October 25
- Hey Major, The Station
- Hollerado, Retaliation Vacation
- Hunter Brothers, State of Mind – January 25
- Nate Husser, 23+
- Andrew Hyatt, Abel

=== I ===
- Iamtheliving, In This Thing Called Life
- Ice Cream, Fed Up
- iskwē, acākosīk - November 8, 2019

=== J ===
- James Barker Band, Singles Only - May 24
- Yves Jarvis, The Same but by Different Means
- JayWood, Time
- Carly Rae Jepsen, Dedicated - May 17
- Lyndon John X, The Warning Track
- Julian Taylor Band, Avalanche - March 29
- Just John x Dom Dias, Don III (April); PROJECT (November)

=== K ===
- Kanen, Kanen
- Kaytranada, Bubba - December 13
- Kid Koala, Music To Draw To: Io - January 25
- Patrick Krief, Dovetale - June 7

=== L ===
- Laurence-Anne, Première apparition
- Avril Lavigne, Head Above Water - February 15
- Lee Harvey Osmond, Mohawk
- Jean Leloup, L'Étrange pays - May 24
- Jacob Lewis, Home Sweet Home
- Murray Lightburn, Hear Me Out - February 22
- Lightning Dust, Spectre
- Loud, Tout ça pour ça - May 24
- The Lowest of the Low, Agitpop - May 31

=== M ===
- Ryan MacGrath, That Woods
- Maestro Fresh Wes, Champagne Campaign - March 8
- Alexandria Maillot, Benevolence - November 22
- Manila Grey, No Saints Loading
- Mappe Of, The Isle of Ailynn - November 1
- Marianas Trench, Phantoms - March 1
- Mauno, Really Well
- Memphis, Leave With Me - February 8
- Millimetrik, Make It Last Forever
- Monsune, Tradition
- Mounties, Heavy Meta - April 26

=== N ===
- nêhiyawak, nipiy
- The New Pornographers, In the Morse Code of Brake Lights - September 27
- Eliza Niemi, Vinegar
- Safia Nolin, xX3m0 $0ng$ 2 $!nG @L0nG 2Xx

=== O ===
- OBUXUM, Re-Birth
- Ocie Elliott, We Fall In
- Okan, Sombras
- John Orpheus, Wey Ya Call Dat Ting?
- Ouri, We Share Our Blood

=== P ===
- Partner, Saturday the 14th
- Orville Peck, Pony
- Jonathan Personne, Histoire naturelle
- Philémon Cimon, Pays
- Planet Giza, Added Sugar
- poolblood, Yummy
- PUP, Morbid Stuff - April 5
- Pvrx, 3.14 - July 26

=== R ===
- Billy Raffoul, Running Wild
- The Reklaws, Freshman Year - August 27
- Reuben and the Dark, un love - October 25
- Amanda Rheaume, The Skin I'm In
- Rheostatics, Here Come the Wolves - September 6
- Riit, Ataataga - October 25
- Julianna Riolino, J.R.
- John River, The Academy - January 25
- Benjamin Dakota Rogers, Better by Now
- Royal Canoe, Waver
- Ruth B, Maybe I'll Find You Again - March 22
- Justin Rutledge, Passages - May 31

=== S ===
- Said the Whale, Cascadia
- Saint Asonia, Flawed Design
- Sarahmée, Irréversible
- Jacques Kuba Séguin, Migrations
- Joseph Shabason, Anne EP - May 10
- Shay Lia, Dangerous
- Silverstein, Redux: The First Ten Years - April 12
- Siskiyou, Not Somewhere - May 17
- Dallas Smith, The Fall - March 13
- Snotty Nose Rez Kids, Trapline
- SonReal, The Aaron LP - May 10
- John Southworth, Miracle in the Night
- Rae Spoon, Mental Health
- The Strumbellas, Rattlesnake - March 29
- Sum 41, Order in Decline - July 19
- Super Duty Tough Work, Studies in Grey

=== T ===
- Tariq, Telegrams - March 29
- Tegan and Sara, Hey, I'm Just Like You - September 27
- Devin Townsend, Empath
- Tobi, STILL - May 3
- Tre Mission, Orphan Black - July 26

=== V ===
- Vile Creature, Preservation Rituals (2015-2018)
- Leif Vollebekk, New Ways - November 1

=== W ===
- Ruby Waters, Almost Naked
- Dawn Tyler Watson, Mad Love
- Patrick Watson, Wave - October 18
- We Are the City, RIP
- Whitehorse, The Northern South, Vol. 2 - January 18
- WHOOP-Szo, Warrior Down
- JJ Wilde, Wilde Eyes, Steady Hands
- Wintersleep, In the Land Of - March 29
- Donovan Woods, The Other Way
- Hawksley Workman, Median Age Wasteland - March 1

== Deaths ==
- January 16 - Jean Chatillon, composer
- January 16 - Alfred Kunz, composer
- February 9 - Phil Western, electronic/industrial musician
- February 23 - Johnnie Lovesin, rock singer
- February 28 - Ed Bickert, jazz guitarist
- March 6 - Charlie Panigoniak, singer-songwriter
- March 22 - Joe Hall, singer-songwriter
- April 1 - Vladimir Orloff, cellist
- April 20 - David Zafer, violinist
- May 20 - Dave Bookman, musician (The Bookmen) and radio personality (CFNY-FM, CIND-FM)
- June 16 - Adam Litovitz, rock musician and film composer
- November 20 - John Mann, singer and guitarist (Spirit of the West)
- December 5 - Leon Cole, organist, composer and classical music radio host
- December 15 - Monique Leyrac, singer
- December 24 - Kelly Fraser, singer
