= 2020 in Canadian music =

The following musical events and releases that happened in 2020 in Canada.

== Events ==
- April 4 – 15th Canadian Folk Music Awards are announced online following the cancellation of the ceremony due to the COVID-19 pandemic
- May – Prism Prize
- June 15 – Preliminary longlist for the 2020 Polaris Music Prize is announced
- June 29 – Juno Awards of 2020 are announced online following the cancellation of the original March 15 ceremony due to the COVID-19 pandemic
- July – Shortlist for the Polaris Music Prize announced
- August 5 – SOCAN Songwriting Prize winners announced
- October 19 – Backxwash wins the 2020 Polaris Music Prize for the album God Has Nothing to Do With This Leave Him Out of It.
- November 1 – 42nd Felix Awards

== Albums released ==
=== # ===
- 2Frères, À tous les vents
- 88Glam, New Mania – June 26

=== A ===
- Aerialists, Dear Sienna
- Allie X, Cape God – February 21
- Don Amero, The Next Chapter – September 25
- Ammoye, I Am Love
- Tafari Anthony, The Way You See Me
- Arkells, Campfire Chords – August 20
- Tenille Arts, Love, Heartbreak, & Everything in Between – January 10
- Aquakultre, Legacy – May 8
- Aquakultre and Uncle Fester, Bleeding Gums Murphy – October 9
- Ardn, ALIEN
- Art of Time Ensemble, Ain't Got Long
- Rich Aucoin, United States – September 18
- Austra, Hirudin – May 1

=== B ===
- Backxwash, God Has Nothing to Do With This Leave Him Out of It
- Badge Époque Ensemble, Self-Help
- Bahamas, Sad Hunk – October 9
- Jason Bajada, Elizabeth
- Tim Baker, Survivors – July 10
- Jill Barber, Entre nous
- Quinton Barnes, AARUPA
- Gary Beals, Bleed My Truth – October 23
- Daniel Bélanger, Travelling – October 2
- Belinda (Lisa LeBlanc), It's Not a Game, It's a Lifestyle
- Beòlach, All Hands
- Beyries, Encounter
- Laila Biali, Out of Dust
- Justin Bieber, Changes – February 14
- Billy Talent, TBA
- The Birthday Massacre, Diamonds – March 27
- Forest Blakk, Sideways
- Bob Moses, Desire (EP) – August 28
- Will Bonness, Change of Plans
- Born Ruffians, JUICE – April 3
- John Borra, Blue Wine
- Braids, Shadow Offering – June 19
- Dean Brody, Boys – November 18
- Bruce Peninsula, No Earthly Sound – April 17
- Roxane Bruneau, Acrophobie
- Basia Bulat, Are You in Love? – March 27

=== C ===
- Shawna Cain, The Way
- Lou Canon, Audomatic Body
- Caribou, Suddenly – February 28
- Carys, To Anyone Like Me
- Casey MQ, babycasey
- Jennifer Castle, Monarch Season – October 16
- Ramon Chicharron, Pescador de sueños
- Cindy Lee, What's Tonight to Eternity
- Cindy Lee, Cat o' Nine Tails
- Clairmont the Second, It's Not How It Sounds – July 10
- Classified, Time – September 25
- Ora Cogan, Bells in the Ruins
- Louis-Jean Cormier, Quand la nuit tombe
- Rose Cousins, Bravado – February 21
- CRi, Juvenile
- Crown Lands, Crown Lands
- Crown Lands, Wayward Flyers Vol. 1

=== D ===
- The Darcys, Fear & Loneliness – November 13
- Sophie Day, Clémence
- The Dears, Lovers Rock – May 15
- Helena Deland, Someone New – October 16
- Destroyer, Have We Met – January 31
- Dizzy, The Sun and Her Scorch
- Dog Day, Present
- Gord Downie, Away Is Mine – October 16
- Alan Doyle, Rough Side Out – February 14
- Drake, Dark Lane Demo Tapes – May 1
- Dvsn, A Muse in Her Feelings – April 17

=== E ===
- Fred Eaglesmith and Tif Ginn, Alive
- Jade Eagleson, Jade Eagleson – July 24
- Kathleen Edwards, Total Freedom – August 14
- Elephant Stone, Hollow – February 14
- Lindsay Ell, Heart Theory – August 14
- Elliott Brood, Keeper – September 18
- Emanuel, Alt Therapy Session 1: Disillusion (June); Alt Therapy Session 2: Transformation (December)
- Micah Erenberg, Art Week (the album); HBD Michael Toronto
- Eric Ethridge, Good with Me – October 30
- Evening Hymns, Heavy Nights – June 26

=== F ===
- Fast Romantics, Pick It Up
- Luca Fogale, Nothing Is Lost
- FouKi, Grignotines de luxe
- FouKi and Koriass, Génies en herbe
- The Franklin Electric, In Your Head/In Your Heart
- Fredz, Personne ne touche le ciel

=== G ===
- The Garrys, Haxan
- Hannah Georgas, All That Emotion
- Matthew Good, Moving Walls – February 21
- Grandson, Death of an Optimist – December 4
- Gordon Grdina, Prior Street
- Great Lake Swimmers, When Last We Shook Hands: Cover Songs, Vol. 1
- Great Lake Swimmers, Live in Ottawa at the 27 Club, October 3, 2019
- Grimes, Miss Anthropocene – February 21
- Matthew Grimson, Prize for Writing

=== H ===
- Half Moon Run, The Covideo Sessions
- Half Moon Run, Seasons of Change
- Harm & Ease, Midnight Crisis
- Sarah Harmer, Are You Gone – February 21
- High Valley, Grew Up On That – May 8
- Matt Holubowski, Weird Ones
- Holy Fuck, Deleter – January 17
- Andrew Hyatt, Neverland

=== J ===
- Sammy Jackson, With You
- David James, If I Were You – March 13
- Ryland James, Ryland James
- Ryland James, A Little Christmas
- Japandroids, Massey Fucking Hall – June 19
- Yves Jarvis, Sundry Rock Song Stock – September 25
- Carly Rae Jepsen, Dedicated Side B – May 21
- The Jerry Cans, Echoes – May 15
- Berk Jodoin, Berk Jodoin
- July Talk, Pray for It – July 10
- Junia-T, Studio Monk
- Juurini, Saimanrimut

=== K ===
- K-Anthony, The Cure
- Peter Katz, City of Our Lives
- Khotin, Finds You Well
- Brett Kissel, Now or Never – January 1
- Kiwi Jr., Football Money
- k-os, Boshido – May 29
- Krief, Chemical Trance – August 14

=== L ===
- Matt Lang, More – June 5
- Land of Talk, Indistinct Conversations
- Jessy Lanza, All the Time – July 24
- Laurence-Anne, Accident
- Shay Lia, Solaris – September 25
- Gordon Lightfoot, Solo – March 20
- Loony, JOYRiDE
- Loud Luxury, Nights Like This – March 27
- Corb Lund, Agricultural Tragic – July 26

=== M ===
- Catherine Major, Carte mère
- Dan Mangan, Thief – November 20
- Cory Marks, Who I Am – August 7
- Matthew Tavares & Leland Whitty, Visions – March 20
- Matt Mays, Dog City – August 28
- Jon McKiel, Bobby Joe Hope
- Shawn Mendes, Wonder – December 4
- Tyler Joe Miller, Sometimes I Don't, But Sometimes I Do – November 6
- Ryland Moranz, XO, 1945
- Alanis Morissette, Such Pretty Forks in the Road – July 31
- MSTRKRFT, Black Gloves – October 30
- David Myles, Leave Tonight – May 8

=== N ===
- N Nao and Joni Void, Nature morte
- Eliza Niemi, Glass
- Nyssa, Girls Like Me

=== O ===
- The OBGMs, The Ends – October 30
- Ocie Elliott, In That Room; Tracks
- Odario, Good Morning Hunter – October 23

=== P ===
- The Pack A.D., It Was Fun While It Lasted
- Partner, Never Give Up – November 20
- PartyNextDoor, Partymobile – March 27
- PartyNextDoor, Partypack – October 16
- Nico Paulo, Wave Call
- Orville Peck, Show Pony EP
- Klô Pelgag, Notre-Dame-des-Sept-Douleurs
- Jonathan Personne, Disparitions
- Philémon Cimon, Philédouche
- Lido Pimienta, Miss Colombia
- Dany Placard, J'connais rien à l'astronomie
- Plants and Animals, The Jungle
- Joel Plaskett, 44 – April 17
- Population II, À la Ô Terre
- MacKenzie Porter, Drinkin' Songs: The Collection – November 6
- William Prince, Reliever – February 7
- William Prince, Gospel First Nation – October 23
- Protest the Hero, Palimpsest – June 18
- P'tit Belliveau, Greatest Hits, Vol. 1
- Purity Ring, Womb – April 3

=== Q ===
- Quin with One N, Out of the Blue

=== R ===
- Billy Raffoul, International Hotel
- Allan Rayman, Christian – April 3
- Savannah Ré, Opia
- Regina Gently, Don't Wait to Love Me – September 18
- Noah Reid, Gemini – May 28
- The Reklaws, Sophomore Slump – October 16
- Jessie Reyez, Before Love Came to Kill Us – March 27
- Daniel Romano, Content to Point the Way
- Daniel Romano, Dandelion
- Daniel Romano, Forever Love's Fool
- Daniel Romano, Okay Wow
- Daniel Romano, Spider Bite
- Daniel Romano, Super Pollen
- Daniel Romano, Visions of the Higher Dream – March 17
- Daniel Romano, Daniel Romano's Outfit Do (What Could Have Been) Infidels By Bob Dylan & the Plugz
- Daniel Romano, White Flag
- Rum Ragged, The Thing About Fish

=== S ===
- Sam Roberts Band, All Of Us – October 16
- Sargeant X Comrade, Magic Radio – June 20
- Sea Oleena, Weaving a Basket
- Seaway, Big Vibe – October 16
- Shabason, Krgovich and Harris, Philadelphia
- Jairus Sharif, Q4DB (I Can Learn and Honor, Mould, In the Open, Simple)
- Andy Shauf, The Neon Skyline – January 24
- Mike Shabb, Life Is Short
- Crystal Shawanda, Church House Blues – April 17
- Silverstein, A Beautiful Place to Drown – March 6
- Dylan Sinclair, Proverb
- Gord Sinclair, Taxi Dancers – February 28
- Zal Sissokho, Kora Flamenca
- Dallas Smith, Timeless – August 28
- Arielle Soucy, Shame and Waterway
- Souldia, Silence radio and Backstage
- Storry, CH III: The Come Up
- Storry, Interlude-19
- Summersets, Small Town Saturday

=== T ===
- Julian Taylor, The Ridge – June 19
- Theory of a Deadman, Say Nothing – January 31
- Tobi, ELEMENTS Vol. 1 – October 21

=== U ===
- U.S. Girls, Heavy Light – March 6
- Terry Uyarak, Nunarjua Isulinginniani – October 30

=== V ===
- Mathew V, Two Faced
- Vagina Witchcraft, Vagina Witchcraft
- Rosie Valland, Blue
- Vile Creature, Glory, Glory! Apathy Took Helm!
- Vision Eternel, For Farewell of Nostalgia – September 14

=== W ===
- Rufus Wainwright, Unfollow the Rules – July 10
- Colter Wall, Western Swing & Waltzes and Other Punchy Songs – August 28
- We Are the City, RIP – January 24
- Ruby Waters, If It Comes Down to It
- Weaves, TBA
- The Weeknd, After Hours – March 20
- WHOOP-Szo, Warrior Remixes
- Wild Rivers, Songs to Break Up To
- JJ Wilde, Ruthless
- Witch Prophet, DNA Activation – March 24
- Wolf Parade, Thin Mind – January 24
- Donovan Woods, Without People – November 6
- Roy Woods, Dem Times – May 15
- Hawksley Workman, Less Rage More Tears – October 23

=== Y ===
- Jonah Yano, Souvenir
- Nikki Yanofsky, Turn Down the Sound – July 10
- Yukon Blonde, Vindicator – November 13

=== Z ===
- Zen Bamboo, Glu
- Zoon, Bleached Wavves

== Deaths ==
- January 7 – Neil Peart, 67, drummer for Rush
- February 1 – George Blondheim, 63, pianist and composer
- March 7 – Laura Smith, 67, folk singer-songwriter
- April 4 – Barry Allen, rock singer
- May 12 – Renée Claude, 80, pop singer ("Tu trouveras la paix", "C'est toi, c'est moi, c'est lui, c'est nous autres")
- May 26 – Houdini, 21, rapper
- June 26 – Graeme Williamson, rock singer (Pukka Orchestra).
- August 10 – Salome Bey, 86, blues singer
