= Valland (surname) =

Valland is a surname associated with the Norse name Valland. Notable people with the surname include:

- Åsne Valland Nordli (born 1975), Norwegian folk singer
- Rose Valland, French art curator and resistance member
- Rosie Valland
