= Francouvertes =

Music festival in Quebec, Canada

Francouvertes is an annual music festival in Montreal, Quebec, Canada, which spotlights emerging francophone and indigenous musical artists from Quebec.

At the end of each year's festival, three finalists are named, following which a jury presents an award of $10,000 to an artist chosen as the best artist of the festival.

== Winners ==
Following are the winners and first and second runners-up of each year's event.

=== 1995 ===
- Sylvie Royer
- 8e porte à gauche
- Les Tchigaboux

=== 1996 ===
- Jocelyn Bigras
- Garnote
- Danielle Richard et sa cage de bruits

=== 1997 ===
- Ivy
- Sara Vafaï
- WD-40

=== 1999 ===
- Apogée
- Gwenwed
- Le Quartier des papillons souterrains

=== 2000 ===
- Loco Locass
- Gaétan Leboeuf
- Les Cowboys Fringants

=== 2001 ===
- La Chango Family
- ?Alice!
- Hugo Bonneville

=== 2002 ===
- Kulcha Connection
- Karlof Orchestra
- Karkwa

=== 2003 ===
- Syncop
- Les Breastfeeders
- Les Goules

=== 2005 ===
- Damien Robitaille
- Caniche Hara-Kiri
- Masse Poésie

=== 2006 ===
- Ma blonde est une chanteuse
- David Marin
- Mathieu Mathieu

=== 2007 ===
- Mimosa
- Émilie Proulx
- Deya

=== 2008 ===
- La Patère Rose
- Le Citoyen
- Bonjour Brumaire

=== 2009 ===
- Ariel
- Francis d'Octobre
- Mad'Moizèle Giraf

=== 2010 ===
- Bernard Adamus
- Monogrenade
- Alex Nevsky

=== 2011 ===
- Chloé Lacasse
- Canailles
- Karim Ouellet

=== 2012 ===
- Les sœurs Boulay
- Francis Faubert
- Gazoline

=== 2013 ===
- Les Hay Babies
- Dead Obies
- Marcie

=== 2014 ===
- Philippe Brach
- Julie Blanche
- Deux pouilles en cavale

=== 2015 ===
- Dylan Perron et Élixir de Gumbo
- C-Antoine Gosselin
- Émile Bilodeau

=== 2016 ===
- La Famille Ouellette
- Caltâr-Bateau
- Mon Doux Saigneur

=== 2017 ===
- Lydia Képinski
- Les Louanges
- Laurence-Anne

=== 2018 ===
- LaF
- Lou-Adriane Cassidy
- CRABE

=== 2019 ===
- Original Gros Bonnet
- Alex Burger
- P'tit Belliveau et les Grosses Coques

=== 2020 ===
- Valence
- Ariane Roy
- Narcisse

=== 2021 ===
- Étienne Coppée
- Calamine
- Ambre ciel

=== 2022 ===
- Rau Ze
- Hôte
- Émile Bourgault

=== 2023 ===
- Jeanne Côté
- Parazar
- Héron

=== 2024 ===
- Soleil Launière
- Sensei H
- Loïc Lafrance

=== 2025 ===
- Muhoza et sa troupe
- Leone Volta
- Kate Pereira
