= Les Louanges =

Canadian musician

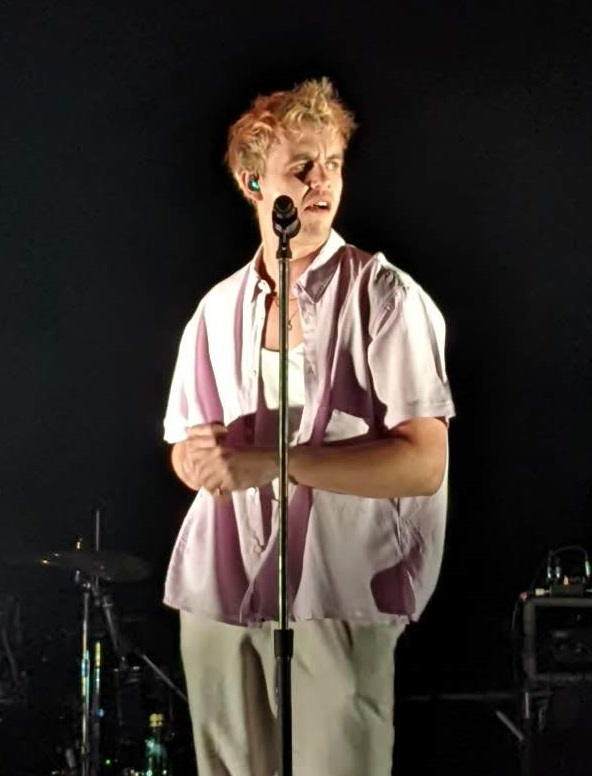
- Les Louanges performing on stage in 2022

Background information
- Born: Vincent Roberge
- Origin: Lévis, Québec, Canada
- Genres: R&B, Jazz, Pop, Electropop, Indie pop
- Occupation: Singer-Songwriter
- Years active: 2016-present
- Label: Bonsound
- Website: https://www.leslouanges.com/

Les Louanges is a Canadian indie pop act from Québec, created and performed by Vincent Roberge. He currently has 3 released albums with his label Bonsound.

== Career ==
Originally from Lévis, Vincent Roberge moved to Montréal in 2015. Les Louanges is a nickname he got in high school and decided to use as his stage name.

Les Louanges is Roberge's solo act, on which he works mostly alone. Roberge also works in close proximity with his friend and colleague Félix Petit, his saxophonist, who co-directed his 2 albums, and helps him with inspiration and arrangements.

Roberge was discovered in 2015, as a finalist at the Festival international de la chanson de Granby.

In 2016, Roberge released his first EP Le Mercure on Bandcamp, and then a year later, he released it officially with the song Encéphaline added, for which he received the Prix de la chanson SOCAN.

He participated in the Francouvertes competition in 2017, finishing as a top three finalist behind winner Lydia Képinski. This opportunity lead him to meet both his manager and get signed with his label, Bonsound.

In 2018, he released his first studio album, La nuit est une panthère. This album counts 11 songs and 3 interludes. It is a mix of R'n'B, jazz, hip-hop, and more. La nuit est une panthère, was a shortlisted nominee for the 2019 Polaris Music Prize, and won the Juno Award for Francophone Album of the Year at the Juno Awards of 2020. In addition to the Polaris Prize nomination, Roberge received a SOCAN Songwriting Prize nomination in the French division for his song "Tercel". Les Louanges won 3 Félix at his first Gala de l'ADISQ in 2019 for this album.

Vincent Roberge won the Prix Félix-Leclerc at the 2019 edition of Les Francos de Montréal, and the Prix Espoir FEQ at the Festival d'été de Québec. The single "Attends-moi pas" was shortlisted for the 2020 SOCAN Songwriting Prize.

He composed music for Anne Émond's 2019 film Young Juliette (Jeune Juliette). The project is a solo work, for which he signed in his birth name.

In 2022, Les Louanges released his second album, Crash. This album is composed of 13 songs, and 2 interludes. It is more intimate than his first album, and it tells the stories of his young adult life. Everything is written in the artist's own perspective, as he thinks it is the only way to make it authentic, and truly real.Topics such as breakups, addiction, and sexual assault are covered on this album.This album also presents a collaboration; Les Louanges sings with Corneille the title song Crash. This album won the Juno Award for Francophone Album of the Year at the Juno Awards of 2023.

On April 10, 2026, Roberge released his third album, Alouette!. The album was received favorably by critics, who highlight its "scathing" and "sensitive" lyrics. Critics also praise the album’s "maturity" and introspective character, as well as the depth of its themes, although some lament the heaviness of the lyrics. Roberge mentions Leonard Cohen, Frank Ocean, Talking Heads, Bob Dylan, Bruce Springsteen, Dijon and Mk.gee among the album’s musical influences. Like Crash was in 2022, Alouette! is on the long list of the Polaris award in 2026.

== Performances ==
- Fall of 2018: opening acts for both Philippe Brach and Ariane Moffatt.
- June 2019: sold-out show at the Club Soda for the Francos de Montréal.
- June 2022: performed at the Francos de Montréal on the Silo Brasseurs de Montréal stage.
- June 2023: performed on the Bell stage of the Francos de Montréal, in what he considered "the biggest show of his life".

== Awards and nominations ==
- 2019: Shortlisted nominee for the 2019 Polaris Music Prize for his debut album, La nuit est une panthère.
- 2019: Won the Prix Félix-Leclerc at Les Francos de Montréal.
- 2019: Won the Prix Espoir FEQ at the Festival d'été de Québec.
- 2019: Won 3 Félix at the Gala de l'ADISQ for his debut album, La nuit est une panthère.
- 2020: Won the Juno Award for Francophone Album of the Year at the Juno Awards of 2020.
- 2023: Won the Juno Award for Francophone Album of the Year at the Juno Awards of 2023 for his second album, Crash.
- 2026: Shortlisted for the 2026 Polaris Music Prize for Alouette!
- 2026: Longlisted for the SOCAN Polaris Song Prize for "Correct" and "La journé va être chaude"

== Discography ==
=== Singles ===
2017: Encéphaline

2018: Pitou

2019: Attends-moi pas

2021: Pigeons

2021: Qu'est-ce que tu m'fais

2021: Chaussée

2022: Crash (feat. Corneille)

2023: Sur la mélodie (feat. Ichon)

2025: GODDAMN!

2025: Je confirme ma présence!

2026: La journée va être chaude

=== EPs ===
2016: Le Mercure - EP

1. Le Mercure
2. La bombe Atomichaëlle
3. Andromède
4. Les RDV manqués de Babylone
5. Encéphaline

2019: Expansion Pack - EP

1. Attends-moi pas
2. Parc Ex
3. Les yeux sur la balle (feat. Robert Nelson)
4. Drumz (feat. Maky Lavender)
5. Arbois

=== Albums ===
2018: La nuit est une panthère

1. Amex a)
2. Pâle
3. Piou
4. DMs
5. Kekaula
6. Tercel
7. Jupiter
8. Westcott
9. Amex b)
10. La nuit est une panthère
11. Guérilla
12. Romains
13. Amex c)
14. Platane

2022: Crash

1. Prologue
2. Chaussée
3. Bolero
4. Encore
5. Qu'est-ce que tu m'fais
6. Cruze
7. Gaston
8. Facile
9. Chérie
10. Pigeons
11. Mono
12. Déziel
13. Chaperon
14. Crash (feat. Corneille)
15. Dernière

2026: Alouette!

1. Je confirme ma présence
2. Au pied de la montagne (sauvez mon âme)
3. Alouette, tu te fais plumer!
4. Promis juré
5. Correct
6. Franchement, Lia
7. Ne me quitte pas des yeux
8. Tu me coupes l'herbe
9. à la nage
10. La journée va être chaude
11. Alouette, as-tu oublié?
12. Chez nous
13. Le gars dans le cadre de porte
14. GODDAMN!
15. Je bouge pas
