= Bernard Adamus =

Canadian singer-songwriter (born 1977)

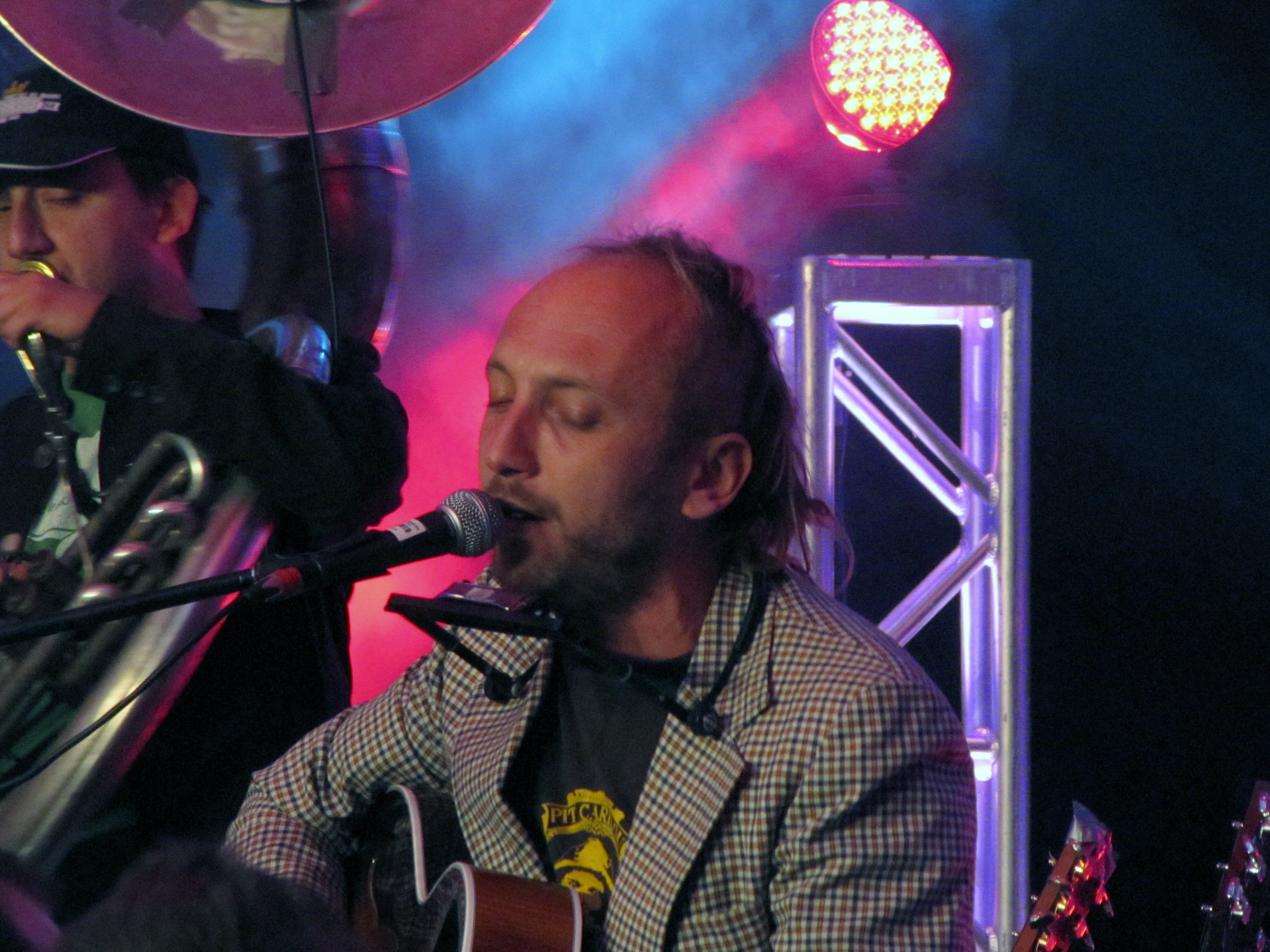
- Bernard Adamus in 2012

Background information
- Born: December 16, 1977 (age 48); Poland
- Origin: Montreal, Quebec, Canada
- Genres: Roots, blues, country, folk
- Instruments: Vocals, guitar, harmonica
- Years active: 2009–present
- Website: www.bernardadamus.com

Bernard Adamus (born December 16, 1977) is a Canadian singer-songwriter based in Quebec, whose music draws on folk, blues, country and hip-hop influences.

== Biography ==
Adamus immigrated to Quebec with his family at the age of three, and was raised in Montreal.

In 2009, Adamus released his debut album Brun on Grosse Boîte. The album was supported by the singles "La question à 100 piasses" and "Brun (la couleur de l'amour)". He won several awards at that year's Festival en chanson de Petite-Vallée, including the Artisti award for best performance and the Prix de la guitare Boucher. He won the 2009 Echo Songwriting Prize (French) for "La question à 100 piasses", and in 2010 he was named winner of that year's Francouvertes festival. The album was a shortlisted nominee for Folk Album of the Year at the 2010 Félix Awards, and Adamus won the award for Découverte de l'année (Best New Artist).

A non-album single, "Rue Ontario", was released in 2010, featuring both a live recording of the song and a remix by electronic artist Marie-Hélène "MHMHMH" Delorme.

In 2011 he won the Prix Félix-Leclerc at the FrancoFolies de Montréal, and his album Brun was a shortlisted nominee for the Juno Award for Francophone Album of the Year at the Juno Awards of 2011 against Karkwa's winning album Les Chemins de verre.

He followed up with his second album, N° 2, in 2012. The album was a nominee for Folk Album of the Year at the 2013 Félix Awards, losing to Les sœurs Boulay's Le poids des confettis. Voters in CBC Radio 3's year-end Bucky Awards for 2012 also named Adamus winner of the "Best Reason to Learn French" award.

=== Sexual assault ===
In July 2020, Bernard Adamus was accused of committing several inappropriate gestures. On social media, several people shared rumours that Adamus committed sexual assault. Following these allegations, his record label Dare to Care, ended their professional relationship. Adamus did not deny the allegations, and apologized for his behaviour.

== Discography ==
- Brun (2009)
- N° 2 (2012)
- Sorel Soviet So What (2015)
- C'qui nous reste du Texas (2019)
- Chansons à l'huile (2024)
