= Bonsound =

Canadian music company

- Founded: 2004
- Founder: Jean-Christian Aubry; Gourmet Délice; Yanick Masse
- Country of origin: Canada
- Location: Montreal, Quebec, Canada
- Official website: www.bonsound.com

Bonsound is a music company founded in 2004 and based in Montreal, Quebec, Canada. Bonsound is an artist management company, a record label, a booking agency, a concert promoter and a promotion & publicity agency. Bonsound also operates two subsidiary: Bonsound Concerts, an event promoter featuring artists from Montreal and abroad; And Bonsound Promo, an agency which promotes projects not directly linked to Bonsound.

== History ==
Founded in October 2004 by Gourmet Délice, Jean-Christian Aubry and Yanick Masse, Bonsound won the award for management company of the year at the industry gala of L'ADISQ (2008, 2013 and 2014). They also won two more Félix awards in 2014 for show producer of the year and web promo team of the year (Producteur de spectacles de l'année, Équipe promo Web).

== Artists ==
- Beyries
- Les Breastfeeders
- Corridor
- Dead Obies
- DJ Champion
- Duchess Says
- Elisapie
- Flying Hórses
- Geoffroy
- Laurence-Anne
- Lisa LeBlanc
- Les Louanges
- Magi Merlin
- Malajube
- Marie Davidson
- Mark Clennon
- Mélissa Laveaux
- Milk & Bone
- Monogrenade
- Pierre Kwenders
- Philippe B
- Population II
- Radio Radio
- Safia Nolin
