= Robert Robert =

Canadian electronic musician

Robert Robert is the stage name of Arthur Gaumont-Marchand, a Canadian electronic music DJ and performer from Montreal, Quebec. He is most noted for his song "Les gens", which was shortlisted for the SOCAN Songwriting Prize in the French category in 2022.

Born and raised in Montreal, Gaumont-Marchand worked as a DJ and producer before releasing Silicone Villeray, his first album as a singer, in 2021. The album featured contributions from CRi, Benoit Parent, Félix Petit and Hubert Lenoir.

He followed up in 2023 with the album Bienvenue au pays, and in 2025 with Boost.

He has also composed music for film and television.
