= La Patère Rose =

Canadian musical group

- Origin: Sherbrooke, Quebec, Canada
- Genres: Electro-pop
- Years active: 2003–2011
- Labels: Grosse Boîte
- Past members: Thomas Hébert (Roboto), Julien Harbec (Kilojules), Fanny Grosjean (Fanny Bloom)
- Website: La Patère Rose

La Patère Rose was a Canadian francophone electro-pop group formed in 2003 in Sherbrooke, Quebec. The band was composed of keyboardist Roboto (Thomas Hébert), drummer Kilojules (Julien Harbec), and singer-pianist Fanny Bloom (Fanny Grosjean).

The band played at the FrancoFolies in 2008; their song "Back Yard Souvenir" was named best song at the Francouvertes.

The band then recorded their self-titled debut album and began touring in Quebec. The album was a longlisted nominee for the 2009 Polaris Music Prize.

The band later performed at the South By SouthWest festival in Austin, Texas.

In 2011, La Patère Rose disbanded after playing a farewell show at Cabaret du Mile End.

== Discography ==
- 2009: La Patère Rose
- 2010: Waikiki

== Awards ==
- 2008 - Francouvertes Grand Prize

== See also ==
- Music of Canada
- List of bands from Canada
