= Tizzo =

Canadian rapper

Tizzo is the stage name of Teddy Laguerre, a Canadian rapper from Quebec. He is most noted for his single "On fouette", a collaboration with Shreez and Soft which won the French category of the SOCAN Songwriting Prize in 2019.

Originally from the borough of Ahuntsic-Cartierville in Montreal, he moved to the suburb of Laval at age 16. Although casually interested in music, he became more active in the late 2010s after his older brother was killed in an incident with the police. He took his stage name from the pronunciation of "p'tits os", or "little bones", in reference to his short stature at the time he began rapping.

He has released numerous mixtape albums and EPs since 2018.

== Discography ==
- Tu sais, Vol. 1 (2018)
- Zowlloween (2018)
- 51tr4p Fr4p50 (2018)
- Fouette Jean-Baptiste (2018)
- Fouette Saint-Patrick (2019)
- Joyeuse Fouette (2019)
- Canicule, Vol. 1 (2019)
