= MorMor =

Canadian musician (born 1992)

- Born: Seth Nyquist; 1992 (age 33–34); Toronto, Canada
- Genres: Indie pop
- Occupation: Musician
- Instrument: Multiple
- Label: Don't Guess
- Website: mormormusic.com

Seth Nyquist (born 1992), better known as MorMor, is a Canadian indie pop musician.

== Biography ==
Seth Nyquist was born in Toronto in 1992. After living in a foster home, he was adopted by a Swedish Canadian University of Toronto professor of English, Mary Nyquist, who raised him alongside her daughter. His choice of pseudonym was motivated by his affection for his grandmother—"mormor" means "maternal grandmother" in Swedish. He loved music from an early age; artists whose work he particularly enjoyed included the Beatles and Pink Floyd. He sang in his school's choir and played trumpet in a band.

After he finished school, Nyquist studied sociology at Toronto's Ryerson University, but he dropped out after one semester in order to focus on his musical career, taking piano and vocal training instead.

In 2015, he released his debut EP, Live for Nothing, under the moniker MorMor. In 2018, MorMor released the EP Heaven's Only Wishful through his own label, Don't Guess.

In 2019, he received a SOCAN Songwriting Prize nomination for the song "Whatever Comes to Mind".

== Discography ==
Albums

- Semblance (2022)

EPs

- Live for Nothing (2015)
- Heaven's Only Wishful (2018)
- Some Place Else (2019)

Singles

- "Heaven's Only Wishful" (2018)
- "Whatever Comes to Mind" (2018)
- "Waiting on the Warmth" (2018)
- "Pass the Hours" (2018)
- "Outside" (2019)
- "Won't Let You" (2019)
- "Don't Cry" (2020)
- "Far Apart" (2022)
- "Seasons Change" (2022)
