= Katie Moore (singer-songwriter) =

Canadian singer

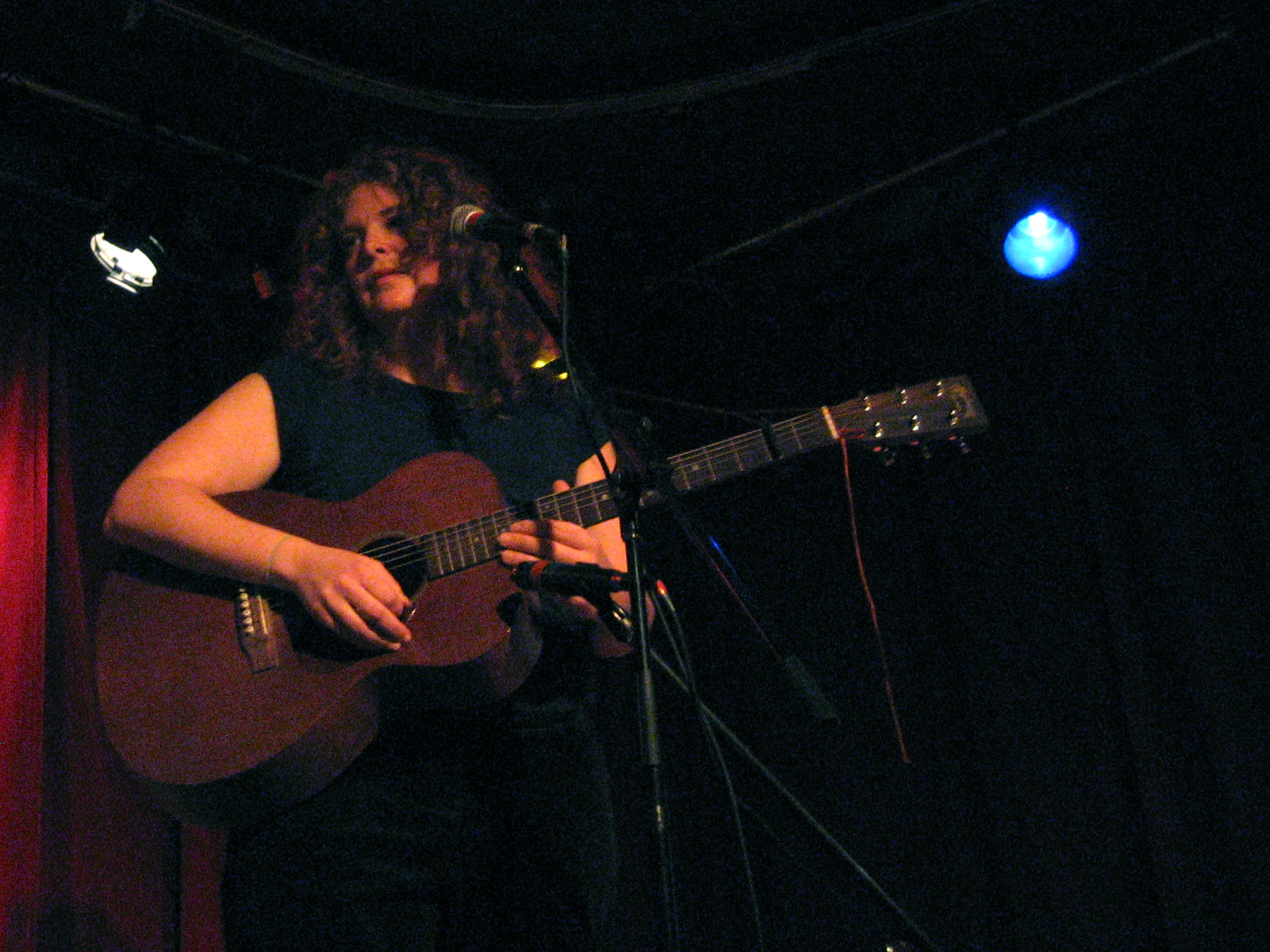
- Moore performing in November 2005

Background information
- Origin: Montreal, Quebec
- Genres: country, folk, indie pop
- Labels: Purple Cat, Borealis
- Website: Katie Moore

Katie Moore is a Canadian singer and songwriter based in Montreal, Quebec, who records and performs with Socalled and El Coyote, and as a solo artist.

She released her debut album, Katie Moore, in 2004. Her second album Only Thing Worse, was released in 2007, and followed up with Montebello in 2011. In 2011, Moore's song "Wake Up Like This" won the SOCAN Songwriting Prize, an annual competition that honours the best song written and released by 'emerging' songwriters over the past year, as voted by the public. The album won a GAMIQ for Folk/Country Album of the Year. Her 2015 album, Fooled By the Fun was listed in No Depression as "One of the top Americana releases by a Canadian this year". In 2017, Moore released a duets album with longtime bass player Andrew Horton, entitled Six More Miles, which was nominated for Folk/Country Album of the Year at the GAMIQ awards in 2018.

In addition to her own career as a solo performer, she is also known for her collaborations. Moore first became noted as a vocalist/songwriter for the Socalled song "You are Never Alone" on 2007 album Ghettoblaster. She has collaborated with Patrick Watson, and with Sam Shalabi's band Land of Kush. Moore has worked as guest vocalist for Plants and Animals., the Barr Brothers, Chilly Gonzales and Feist.

In 2018 Moore released an album with El Coyote, Nashville influenced, alt-country supergroup based in Montreal that focuses on the songwriting of Angela Desveaux, Katie Moore and Michelle Tompkins (Sin and Swoon) and backed by Mike O’Brien (Sin and Swoon), Joe Grass (Patrick Watson, Klaus), Andrew Horton (the Firemen, Notre Dame de Grass) and David Payant (Silver Mt Zion).

== Discography ==
- Katie Moore (2004)
- Only Thing Worse (2007)
- Montebello (2011)
- Fooled By the Fun (2015)
- Six More Miles: Duets with Andrew Horton (2017)
