= SOCAN Songwriting Prize =

Canadian award

The SOCAN Songwriting Prize, formerly known as the ECHO Songwriting Prize, was an annual competition recognizing the best in Canadian emerging music, both anglophone and francophone, from 2006 to 2023.

Established in 2006, the competition was designed to recognize some of the most innovative, creative and artistic songs created in the year preceding the award by emerging songwriters in Canada.

Songs were selected by a competition panel composed of 10 music experts from the Canadian music scene, who each nominated two songs based on a set of criteria they believed to be the best songs by emerging artists from the past year. The songs were narrowed down to a set of 10 finalists and announced publicly. Fans then voted for the winner over the course of two weeks in June. Once the winners (one anglophone and one francophone) were determined after the voting period, they each were awarded a $10,000 cash prize from SOCAN and an assortment of prizes from the yearly sponsors.

Beginning in 2015, the shortlist of nominees was increased from five to ten.

In 2023 the contest was delayed to November, and featured shortlists of eight nominees rather than ten.

No award was presented in 2024. In 2025, SOCAN and the Polaris Music Prize announced the creation of a new SOCAN Polaris Song Prize, to be presented for the first time at the 2025 Polaris Music Prize ceremony.

== Award nominees and winners ==
=== English ===
Year	Songwriters	Song	Performer	Ref(s).
2006	Christopher Hannah, Todd Kowalski, Jordan Samolesky	"A Speculative Fiction"	Propagandhi	
2006	Laura Barrett	"Deception Island Optimists Club"	Laura Barrett	
2006	Owen Pallett	"This Lamb Sells Condos"	Final Fantasy	
2006	Olivier Corbeil, Timothy Fletcher, David Hamelin, Liam O'Neil	"Destroyer"	The Stills	
2006	Hadji Bakara, Dan Boeckner, Spencer Krug, Arlen Thompson	"You Are a Runner and I Am My Father's Son"	Wolf Parade	
2007	Andrew Bernstein, Rodney Pleasant	"Pedal Pusher"	Abdominal	
2007	Stephen Raegele, Nicole Lizee, Jeremiah Bullied, Jonathan Cummins, Olga Goreas, Kevin Laing, Jace Lasek	"Devastation"	The Besnard Lakes	
2007	Jeremy Strachan, Gus Weinkauf	"Doppelspiel"	Feuermusik	
2007	Keri Latimer	"Scarecrow"	Nathan	
2007	Chad VanGaalen	"Graveyard"	Chad VanGaalen	
2008	Stephen Carroll, John K. Samson, Greg Smith, Jason Tait	"Night Windows"	The Weakerthans	
2008	Veda Hille	"Lucklucky"	Veda Hille	
2008	Sandro Perri	"Double Suicide"	Sandro Perri	
2008	Josh Dolgin, Doris Glaspie, Waleed Shabazz, Katie Moore	"You Are Never Alone"	Socalled	
2008	Loel Campbell, Tim D'Eon, Paul Murphy, Jud Haynes	"Weighty Ghost"	Wintersleep	
2009	Derek Christoff, Rob Bakker	"Nobody With a Notepad"	D-Sisive	
2009	Sebastien Grainger	"Love Can Be So Mean"	Sebastien Grainger and the Mountains	
2009	Taylor Kirk	"Lay Down in the Tall Grass"	Timber Timbre	
2009	Joel Plaskett	"Through and Through and Through"	Joel Plaskett	
2009	Elizabeth Powell	"Some Are Lakes"	Land of Talk	
2010	Edo Van Breemen, Bryan Davies, Brennan Saul, John Walsh	"Hearts Trompet"	Brasstronaut	
2010	Olga Goreas, Kevin Laing, Jace Lasek, Richard White	"Albatross"	The Besnard Lakes	
2010	Ethan Kath, Alice Glass	"Celestica"	Crystal Castles	
2010	Catherine McCandless, Stephen Ramsay	"Destroyer"	Young Galaxy, "Destroyer"	
2010	Dan Snaith	"Odessa"	Caribou	
2011	Katie Moore	"Wake Up Like This"	Katie Moore	
2011	Dan Boeckner, Alexei Perry	"When I Get Back"	Handsome Furs	
2011	Edwin Butler, William Butler, Régine Chassagne, Jeremy Gara, Tim Kingsbury, Richard Parry	"We Used to Wait"	Arcade Fire	
2011	Katie Stelmanis	"The Beat and the Pulse"	Austra	
2011	Ben Nelson, Paul Saulnier	"2012"	PS I Love You	
2012	Kathleen Edwards, John Roderick	"A Soft Place to Land"	Kathleen Edwards	
2012	Gordon Grdina, Kenton Loewen, Dan Mangan, John Walsh	"Post-War Blues"	Dan Mangan	
2012	Brian King, David Prowse	"The House That Heaven Built"	Japandroids	
2012	John K. Samson	"When I Write My Master's Thesis"	John K. Samson	
2012	Chris Murphy, Patrick Pentland, Jay Ferguson, Andrew Scott	"Unkind"	Sloan	
2013	Mo Kenney	"Sucker"	Mo Kenney	
2013	Luke Doucet, Melissa McClelland	"Devil's Got a Gun"	Whitehorse	
2013	Megan James, Corey Roddick	"Fineshrine"	Purity Ring	
2013	Maylee Todd	"Baby's Got It"	Maylee Todd	
2013	Tamara Lindeman, Steve Lambke	"Mule in the Flowers"	The Weather Station feat. Baby Eagle	
2014	Alejandra Ribera	"I Want"	Alejandra Ribera	
2014	Stefan Babcock, Nestor Chumack, Zachary Mykula, Steven Sladkowski	"Reservoir"	Pup	
2014	Louise Burns	"Emeralds Shatter"	Louise Burns	
2014	Colyn Cameron	"Gold"	Wake Owl	
2014	Peter Dreimanis, Leah Fay Goldstein, Eamon McGrath, Daniel Miles, Josh Warburton	"Having You Around"	July Talk	
2015	Andrew McTaggart, Danielle McTaggart	"I Heard I Had"	Dear Rouge	
2015	James Anderson, Ladan Hussain	"Old Knives"	Cold Specks	
2015	Rami Afuni, Kiesza	"Hideaway"	Kiesza	
2015	Laura Bates, Tyler Belluz, Aaron Brooks, Lisa Conway, Karen Ng, Chris Sandes, Ira Zingraff	"In My Solitude"	Del Bel	
2015	Elizabeth Lowell Boland, Justin Broad, Paul Herman	"The Bells"	Lowell	
2015	Joel Chambers, Nevon Sinclair, Renee Wisdom	"Young Gunner"	Shi Wisdom	
2015	Daniel Jacques, Allie Ho-Sang	"Private Island"	2nd Son feat. Allie	
2015	Lisa Leblanc	"You Look Like Trouble (But I Guess I Do Too)"	Lisa Leblanc	
2015	Alec O'Hanley, Molly Rankin	"Archie, Marry Me"	Alvvays	
2015	Samantha Savage Smith	"It's a Burn"	Samantha Savage Smith	
2016	Matthew McLeod	"Julia"	Fast Romantics	
2016	Benjamin Addy, Renee Wisdom	"Black Body"	Spek Won feat. Shi Wisdom	
2016	Jahmarie Adams, Michael Lantz	"Dead or Alive"	Jazz Cartier	
2016	Sean Graham, Thomas “Tawgs” Salter	"Pen to Paper"	Modern Space	
2016	Tobias Jesso Jr.	"How Could You Babe"	Tobias Jesso Jr.	
2016	Terra Lightfoot	"No Hurry"	Terra Lightfoot	
2016	Kathleen Monks, Benjamin Reinhartz, James Rowlinson, Elizabeth Ball	"Desire"	Dilly Dally	
2016	Andy Shauf	"Wendell Walker"	Andy Shauf	
2016	Ashton Simmonds, Matthew Burnett, Jordan Evans, Alexander Sowinski, Matthew Tavares, Leland Whitty, Chester Hansen, Keaven Yazdani	"Paradise"	Daniel Caesar feat. BADBADNOTGOOD	
2016	Simon Ward, Jeremy Drury, Jonathan Hembrey, Darryl G.J. James, Brian Leigh Pickett, David Ritter, Joanne Setterington, Isabel Cunningham Ritchie	"Spirits"	The Strumbellas	
2017	Stefan Babcock, Nestor Chumak, Zachary Mykula, Steve Sladkowski	"DVP"	PUP	
2017	Jasmyn Burke, Morgan Waters	"Shithole"	Weaves	
2017	Charlotte Cardin	"Big Boy"	Charlotte Cardin	
2017	Kevin Celestin, Brandon Anderson	"Glowed Up"	Kaytranada feat. Anderson .Paak	
2017	Thomas D'Arcy, Ian Docherty, Peter Dreimanis, Leah Fay Goldstein, Danny Miles, Josh Warburton	"Push + Pull"	July Talk	
2017	Charlotte Day Wilson	"Work"	Charlotte Day Wilson	
2017	Jeremy Drury, Jonathan Hembrey, Darryl James, Brian Pickett, David Ritter, Isabel Ritchie, Joanne Setterington	"We Don't Know"	The Strumbellas	
2017	Tommy Paxton-Beesley, Thadeus Gardwood, Johnathan Mavrogiannis, Dan Voicu	"Acid Test"	River Tiber	
2017	Jessie Reyez, Bjoran Johan, Tobias Frelin, Blake Carter	"Figures"	Jessie Reyez	
2017	Ashton Simmonds, Jordan Evans, Matthew Burnett, Tommy Paxton-Beesley, Ian Culley, Alexander Ernewein	"Won't Live Here"	Daniel Caesar	
2018	Josée Caron, Lucy Niles	"Play the Field"	Partner	
2018	James Barker, Gavin Slate, Travis Wood, Donovan Woods	"Chills"	James Barker Band	
2018	Neil Bednis, Christopher Laurignano, Fraser McClean, Melanie St. Pierre	"Lingua Franca"	Casper Skulls	
2018	Jasmyn Burke, Morgan Waters	"Walkaway"	Weaves	
2018	Charlotte Cardin	"Main Girl"	Charlotte Cardin	
2018	Leandra Earl, Eliza Enman-McDaniel, Jordan Miller, Kylie Miller, Garrett Lee	"Money"	The Beaches	
2018	Eoin Killeen, Timothy Law, Patrisha Sanna Campbell	"Magic"	Birthday Boy and Trish	
2018	Benjamin McCarthy, Meghan Meisters, Ryan Somerville	"Healers"	iskwē	
2018	Alec O'Hanley, Molly Rankin	"Dreams Tonite"	Alvvays	
2018	Jessie Reyez	"Cotton Candy"	Jessie Reyez	
2019	Chester Krupa Carbone, Kevin Hissink, Jordan Benjamin	"Blood//Water"	grandson	
2019	Elizabeth Ball, Kathleen Monks, Benjamin Reinhartz, James Anthony Rowlinson	"Bad Biology"	Dilly Dally	
2019	Kevin Celestin, Shanice Mohamed, Anthony Pierre	"Chances"	Kaytranada feat. Shay Lia	
2019	Dominique Dias, John Samuels	"Soundboi"	Just John x Dom Dias	
2019	Sarah Hagen, Maxwell Pankiw, Isaiah Steinberg	"Payback"	Bad Child	
2019	Scott Helman, Thomas Salter, Gordie Sampson, Simon Wilcox	"Hang Ups"	Scott Helman	
2019	Clairmont Humphrey II	"Tortoise"	Clairmont the Second	
2019	Sam Lucia, Geoff Millar	"Elephant Man"	So Loki	
2019	Seth Nyquist, Adrian Cook	"Whatever Comes to Mind"	MorMor	
2019	Chloé Soldevila, Miles Dupire-Gagnon, Gabriel Lambert, Zachary Irving	"She's the One"	Anemone	
2020	William Prince	"The Spark"	William Prince	
2020	Clairmont Humphrey II	"Grip"	Clairmont the Second	
2020	Kira Huszar, Adam Pondang, Akeel Henry	"Some Kinda Love"	Loony	
2020	Lauren Isenberg, David Charles Fischer, Jeff Hazin, Matt Kahane	"Mind Games"	renforshort	
2020	Meghan Meisters, Mary Beth Ancheta, Alex Mak	"Breaking Down"	iskwē	
2020	Haviah Mighty, Preston Chin, Tim Hill	"Thirteen"	Haviah Mighty	
2020	Rita Claire Mike-Murphy, Zahrah Ibrahim, Andrew Morrison	"#uvangattauq"	Riit	
2020	JP Saxe, Ryan Marrone	"Same Room"	JP Saxe	
2020	Khalid Yassein, Robyn Dell'Unto	"Thinking ‘Bout Love"	Wild Rivers	
2020	Scott Zhang	"Mountain"	Monsune	
2021	Billy Raffoul	"Western Skies"	Billy Raffoul	
2021	Emanuel Assefa, Ryan Bakalarczyk, John Fellner, Kardinal Offishall	"Black Woman"	Emanuel	
2021	Michael Brandolino, Alexander DiMauro, Karah McGillivray, Tom Peyton, Robert Sowinski	"homebody"	Valley	
2021	Carter Britz, Aidan Fuller	"Dancing in My Room"	347aidan	
2021	Clairmont Humphrey II	"Dream"	Clairmont the Second	
2021	Vanessa Kalala, David Charles Fischer, Chris LaRocca, Hrag Sanbalian	"No Smoke"	Lu Kala	
2021	Sydanie Nichol, Casey Manierka-Quaile	"Purple Carousel"	Sydanie	
2021	Kahdijah Payne	"Frontin' Like Pharrell"	DijahSB	
2021	Savannah Ré Simpson, Johann Deterville, Akeel Henry	"Solid"	Savannah Ré	
2021	Jonah Yano, Scott Zhang	"delicate"	Jonah Yano	
2022	Emily Steinwall	"Welcome to the Garden"	Emily Steinwall	
2022	Liam Cole, Thomas Gill, Dorothea Paas, Paul Saulnier	"Container"	Dorothea Paas	
2022	Johann Deterville, Adam Pondang, Savannah Ré Simpson	"24hrs"	Savannah Ré	
2022	Kevin Ekofo, Jordon Manswell, Jonathan Martin, Evan Miles, Jon Vinyl, Corey Wong	"Stacy"	Jon Vinyl	
2022	Erik Fintelman, Robyn Ottolini, Mark Schroor	"Trust Issues"	Robyn Ottolini	
2022	Jeanne Gariépy, Gabrielle Godon	"Can't Let Go"	Laroie	
2022	Brendan Grieve, Nemah Hasan, Stevie Solomon	"Paper Thin"	Nemahsis	
2022	Andrew Lennox, Eric Lourenco, Kirsten Kurvink Palm, Adam Sturgeon, Joe Thorner	"Find a Home"	Status/Non-Status	
2022	Kahdijah Payne	"By Myself"	DijahSB and Harrison	
2022	Amaka Queenette, Joshua Stanberry	"want you more"	Amaka Queenette	
2023	Hannah Kim, Beatrice Laus	"Silver Into Rain"	Luna Li feat. beabadoobee	
2023	Bolu Akande, Tosan Arenyeka	"Big Steppa"	aRENYE	
2023	Max Akres, Jeremy Alain, Corben Bowen, Zachary Djurich, Chris LaRocca, Herag Sanbalian, Jacob Wilkinson-Smith	"Levels"	Boslen	
2023	Dacey Andrada, Justin Tecson	"STEPMOM"	Dacey	
2023	Felix Fox-Pappas, Chester Hansen, Eliza Niemi, Alexander Sowinski, Leland Whitty, Jonah Yano	"always"	Jonah Yano	
2023	Saya Gray	"IF THERE'S NO SEAT IN THE SKY (WILL YOU FORGIVE ME???)"	Saya Gray	
2023	Jeffrey Maurice, Joshua Qaumariaq	"Put 'Em Down"	The Trade-Offs	
2023	Maylee Todd	"Grab Your Guts"	Maylee Todd	

=== French ===
Year	Songwriters	Song	Performer	Ref(s).
2006	Ève Cournoyer	"Tout arrive"	Ève Cournoyer	
2006	Thomas Hellman	"Foutez-moi la paix"	Thomas Hellman	
2006	Louis-Jean Cormier, Michel Gagnon	"Le coup d'état"	Karkwa	
2006	Thomas Augustin, Mathieu Cournoyer, Francis Mineau, Julien Mineau	"La Monogamie"	Malajube	
2006	Thomas Augustin, Mathieu Cournoyer, Francis Mineau, Julien Mineau	"Pâte Filo"	Malajube	
2007	Catherine Leduc	"L'Ours"	Tricot Machine	
2007	Steve Dumas	"Au gré des saisons"	Dumas	
2007	Frank Martel	"Les partitions de l'amour"	Frank Martel et l'ouest céleste	
2007	Xavier Plante	"Montréal (cette ville)"	Xavier Caféïne	
2007	Jérôme Rocipon, Gabriel Lacombe, Simon Weiskopf, Louis-Philippe Jeanbart	"Chewing-gum fraise"	Numéro	
2008	François Lafontaine, Louis-Jean Cormier	"Oublie pas"	Karkwa	
2008	Éric Brousseau, Jean Cyr, Dominique Hamel, Jean Nicol	"The Christ is Right ? Mange ta ville"	Gatineau	
2008	Alexis Dufresne, Pascal Gingras, Fred Filo, Pierre Bouchard, Guillaume Duclos	"Alinéa"	El Motor	
2008	Samuel Tremblay, Sébastien Fréchette, Mathieu Farhoud-Dionne, Sébastien Ricard	"La Paix des braves"	Samian and Loco Locass	
2008	Youri Zaragoza, Nathan Howard, Jordan Larocque, François Lessard	"Argèles"	Bonjour Brumaire	
2009	Bernard Adamus	"La question à 100 piasses"	Bernard Adamus	
2009	Thomas Augustin, Mathieu Cournoyer, Francis Mineau, Julien Mineau	"Porté disparu"	Malajube	
2009	Paul Cargnello	"Bras coupé"	Paul Cargnello and the Frontline	
2009	Marie-Pierre Fournier, François Lafontaine, Gaële Tavernier	"Pourquoi"	Marie-Pierre Arthur	
2009	Yann Perreau	"Beau comme on s'aime"	Yann Perreau	
2010	Maxime Beauregard, Guillaume Beauregard, Patrick Landry, Marie-Eve Roy	"Parasites"	Vulgaires Machins	
2010	Alexandre Champigny, Yannick Duguay	"La maison hantée"	Le Husky	
2010	Fred Fortin	"Le cinéma des vieux garçons"	Fred Fortin	
2010	Damien Robitaille	"L’ermite dans la ville"	Damien Robitaille	
2010	Geneviève Toupin	"Quelque part"	Geneviève Toupin	
2011	Olivier Langevin	"Piste 1"	Galaxie	
2011	Philippe Bergeron	"Petite leçon des ténèbres"	Philippe B	
2011	Géraldine Bureau, Jean-Philippe Fréchette	"Et les brochettes du buffet"	Géraldine	
2011	Jimmy Hunt	"Ça va de soi"	Jimmy Hunt	
2011	Jérôme Minière	"Le Vrai le faux"	Jérôme Minière	
2012	Emmanuel Dubois	"St-Eustache"	Koriass	
2012	Philippe Bergeron, Salomé Leclerc	"Dans la prairie"	Salomé Leclerc	
2012	Mathieu Charbonneau, Stéphane Lafleur, Nicolas Moussette, Joël Vaudreuil	"Intuition #1"	Avec pas d'casque	
2012	Marie-Pierre Fournier, François Lafontaine, Gaële Tavernier	"Si tu savais"	Marie-Pierre Arthur	
2012	Joël Vaudreuil	"Lignes d'hydro"	Lisa LeBlanc	
2013	Keith Kouna	"Batiscan"	Keith Kouna	
2013	Stéphanie Boulay	"Mappemonde"	Les sœurs Boulay	
2013	Mathieu Charbonneau, Stéphane Lafleur, Nicolas Moussette, Joël Vaudreuil	"Walkie-talkie"	Avec pas d'casque	
2013	Fred Fortin	"Vénus"	Gros Mené	
2013	Dany Placard	"Parc'qui m'fallait"	Dany Placard	
2014	Patrice Michaud	"Mécaniques générales"	Patrice Michaud	
2014	Philémon Cimon	"Soleil blanc"	Philémon Cimon	
2014	Louis-Philippe Gingras	"Andromède"	Louis-Philippe Gingras	
2014	Jimmy Hunt, Emmanuel Éthier, Christophe Lamarche-Ledoux	"Nos corps"	Jimmy Hunt	
2014	Klô Pelgag	"La fièvre des fleurs"	Klô Pelgag	
2015	Antoine Corriveau	"Le Nouveau vocabulaire"	Antoine Corriveau	
2015	Julie Aubé, Katrine Noel	"Néguac and Back"	Les Hay Babies	
2015	Guillaume Beauregard	"De pluie et de cendres"	Guillaume Beauregard	
2015	Alexandre Bilodeau, Jacques Alphonse Doucet, José Louis Modabi	"Mardi Gras"	Pierre Kwenders	
2015	Fanny Grosjean, Étienne Dupuis Cloutier	"Piscine"	Fanny Bloom	
2015	Louis-Nicolas Imbeau, Emmanuel Blouin Lajoie	"Publi sac"	Eman & Vlooper	
2015	Salomé Leclerc, Philippe Brault	"Arlon"	Salomé Leclerc	
2015	Alexandre Leclerc-Bernier	"Kryuchkova"	Bernhari	
2015	Benoît Pinette	"Jolie Anne"	Tire le coyote	
2015	Julien Sagot, Antoine Binette Mercier	"Ficelle"	Julien Sagot	
2016	Laurence Nerbonne	"Rêves d’été"	Laurence Nerbonne	
2016	Chantal Archambault, Michel Olivier Gasse	"Saratoga"	Saratoga	
2016	Claude Bégin	"Avant de disparaître"	Claude Bégin	
2016	Mélanie Boulay, Jean-Sébastien Houle	"Les coûteaux à beurre"	Les sœurs Boulay	
2016	Philippe Brach	"Crystel"	Philippe Brach	
2016	Charlotte Cardin	"Les échardes"	Charlotte Cardin	
2016	Félix Dyotte	"Avalanches"	Félix Dyotte	
2016	Alexe Gaudreault, John Nathaniel	"Placebo"	Alexe Gaudreault	
2016	Safia Nolin	"Igloo"	Safia Nolin	
2016	Rosie Valland	"Olympe"	Rosie Valland	
2017	Klô Pelgag, Karl Gagnon	"Les ferrofluides-fleurs"	Klô Pelgag	
2017	Vincent Banville, Gregory Beaudoin, Jonathan Quirion, Jean-François Ruel, Pierre Savu-Massé, Charles-André Vincelette	"Explosif"	Dead Obies	
2017	Pierre-Luc Bégin, Éliane Préfontaine, Julia Daigle, Vincent Lévesque	"Rex"	Paupière	
2017	Amélie Beyries, Maxime Le Flaguais	"J'aurai 100 ans"	Beyries feat. Louis-Jean Cormier	
2017	Charlotte Cardin	"Faufile"	Charlotte Cardin	
2017	Xavier Dufour-Thériault, Jean-Philippe Godbout, Marc-André Landry, Julien Mineau, Ryan Battistuzzi, Jean-Cimon Tellier-Dubé	"L'amour véritable est aux rebelles"	Gazoline	
2017	Lydia Képinski	"Apprendre à mentir"	Lydia Képinski	
2017	Alexandre Leclerc-Bernier	"Je pense à toi"	Bernhari	
2017	John Nathaniel, Mariane Cossette Bacon, Alexe Gaudreault	"Éclat"	Alexe Gaudreault	
2017	Rosie Valland, Jesse MacCormack	"Nord-Est"	Rosie Valland	
2018	Simon Cliche Trudeau, Jeff Martinez, Marc Vincent	"56k"	Loud	
2018	Maude Audet	"Gallaway Road"	Maude Audet	
2018	Simon Beaudoin, Christian David, Antoine Dumoulin Drolet, Sebastien Jean Houle, David Lagace, Christian Renaud	"Tout ce vacarme"	La Famille Ouellette	
2018	Amélie Beyries	"Au-delà des mots"	Beyries	
2018	Philippe Bouchard, Gabriel Desjardins	"La fin du monde"	Philippe Brach	
2018	Philémon Cimon	"Ça va ça va"	Lou-Adriane Cassidy	
2018	Félix Dyotte	"Je cours"	Félix Dyotte and Evelyne Brochu	
2018	Andréanne A. Malette, Manuel Gasse	"Fou"	Andréanne A. Malette	
2018	Émile Proulx-Cloutier	"Petite valise"	Émile Proulx-Cloutier	
2018	Emerik St-Cyr Labbé, Etienne Dupré, Eliott Bundock Durocher, David Marchand, Mandela Dalgeish Coupal	"Primitif"	Mon Doux Saigneur	
2019	Teddy Laguerre, Shawn Volcy, Marc Casseus, Vladimi Methelus	"On fouette"	Tizzo feat. Shreez and Soft	
2019	Tommy Bélisle, Philippe Gauthier Boudreau, Thierry Malépart, Marc-Antoine Barbier, Félix Bélisle	"La valse des trottoirs"	Choses Sauvages	
2019	Simon Bolduc	"Manche ouverte"	Bolduc tout croche	
2019	Hubert Chiasson	"Fille de personne II"	Hubert Lenoir	
2019	Léo Fougère, Clément Langlois-Légaré, Tom St-Laurent	"Zaybae"	FouKi	
2019	Lydia Képinski	"Premier juin"	Lydia Képinski	
2019	Brandon Mignacca, John Nathaniel, Mariane Cossette-Bacon	"Best I'll Never Have (version française)"	Brandon Mig	
2019	Sarahmée Ouellet, Thomas Lapointe, Diego Montenegro, Ingrid Phd Prifti	"T'as pas cru"	Sarahmée	
2019	Obia Magloire Pierre-Louis, Amhed Saghir	"Pas né"	Obia le chef	
2019	Vincent Roberge, Félix Petit, Simon Saint Hillier	"Tercel"	Les Louanges	
2020	Félix Dyotte	"Maintenant ou jamais"	Evelyne Brochu	
2020	Julien Bakvis, Jonathan Robert, Julian Perreault, Dominic Berthiaume	"Topographe"	Corridor	
2020	Alexandre Beauregard, Daphné Brissette, Guillaume Chiasson, Mélissa Fortin, Étienne Côté	"Aujourd’hui"	Bon Enfant	
2020	Justin Boisclair, Thibault de Castelbajac, Benjamin Duplantie-Grenier, Thomas Thivierge-Gauthier, Maxime de Castelbajac, Clément Langlois-Légaré	"Cadran solaire"	LaF	
2020	Lou-Adriane Cassidy, Stéphanie Boulay	"La fin du monde à tous les jours"	Lou-Adriane Cassidy	
2020	Léo Fougère, Tom St-Laurent	"ZayZay"	FouKi	
2020	Laurence-Anne C. Gagné	"Instant Zéro"	Laurence-Anne	
2020	Christian-Adam Gilbert, Mathieu Lafontaine	"Coton ouaté"	Bleu Jeans Bleu	
2020	Vincent Roberge, Félix Petit	"Attends-moi pas"	Les Louanges	
2020	Mat Vezio	"Chaleur 10"	Mat Vezio	
2021	Thierry Larose, Alexandre Martel, Charles-Antoine Olivier	"Les amants de pompéi"	Thierry Larose	
2021	Maude Audet	"Demande-moi"	Maude Audet	
2021	Gabriel Bouchard	"Tu m'connais trop bien"	Gab Bouchard	
2021	Gary Derussy, Sarahmée Nicole Ouellet, Clément Langlois-Légaré, Thomas Lapointe, Diego Montenegro	"Le cœur a ses raisons"	Sarahmée	
2021	Léo Fougères, Clément Langlois-Légaré, Tom St-Laurent, Adel Aoual Kazi	"Oui Toi"	FouKi	
2021	Laurence-Anne Gagné-Charest	"Accident"	Laurence-Anne	
2021	Jonah Richard Guimond	"Income Tax"	P'tit Belliveau	
2021	Michael Christopher Mlakar, Adel Aoual Kazi, Émile Desilet, Clément Langlois-Légaré, Sébastien Pascal Boisseau	"OK"	Clay and Friends	
2021	Ariane Roy, Pierre Emmanuel Beaudoin, Vincent Gagnon, Dominique Plante, Cédric Martel, Roxane Azzaria	"Ta main"	Ariane Roy	
2021	Emerik St-Cyr Labbe	"Tempérance"	Mon Doux Saigneur	
2022	Hubert Chiasson, Félix Petit, Julien Chiasson	"Secret"	Hubert Lenoir	
2022	Steve Casimir, Marc Vincent, Alex Guay	"Normal de l'Est"	Connaisseur Ticaso	
2022	Lou-Adriane Cassidy, Alexandre Martel	"Entre mes jambes"	Lou-Adriane Cassidy	
2022	Étienne Coppée	"Écoute"	Étienne Coppée	
2022	Arthur Gaumont-Marchand	"Les gens"	Robert Robert	
2022	Jonah Richard Guimond	"J'aimerais d'avoir un John Deere"	P'tit Belliveau	
2022	Laurence-Anne	"Indigo"	Laurence-Anne	
2022	Michael Mlakar, Adel Kazi-Aoual, Émile Désilets, Clément Langlois-Légaré, Pascal Boisseau	"Bouge ton thang"	Clay and Friends	
2022	Vincent Roberge, Félix Petit	"Qu'est-ce que tu m'fais?"	Les Louanges	
2022	Ariane Roy, Dominique Plante	"Ce n'est pas de la chance"	Ariane Roy	
2023	Gabriel Bouchard, Mathieu Quenneville	"Ton shift est pas fini"	Gab Bouchard	
2023	Simon Bolduc	"D’où c’que j’viens"	Bolduc tout croche	
2023	Rose-Emmanuelle Brassard, Joannie Michaud, Frédéric Levac	"Attiser le dilemme"	Rosie Valland	
2023	Shamyr Daléus, Nicholas Craven	"C00N"	Raccoon	
2023	Julie Gagnon, Charles Gaudreau-Lerhe	"Lesbienne woke sur l’autotune"	Calamine	
2023	Lydia Képinski	"Depuis"	Lydia Képinski	
2023	Lysandre Ménard	"Tintagel"	Lysandre	
2023	Ariane Roy, Roxane Azzaria	"Fille à porter"	Ariane Roy and Lou-Adriane Cassidy	
