= Lou-Adriane Cassidy =

Canadian singer-songwriter (born 1997)

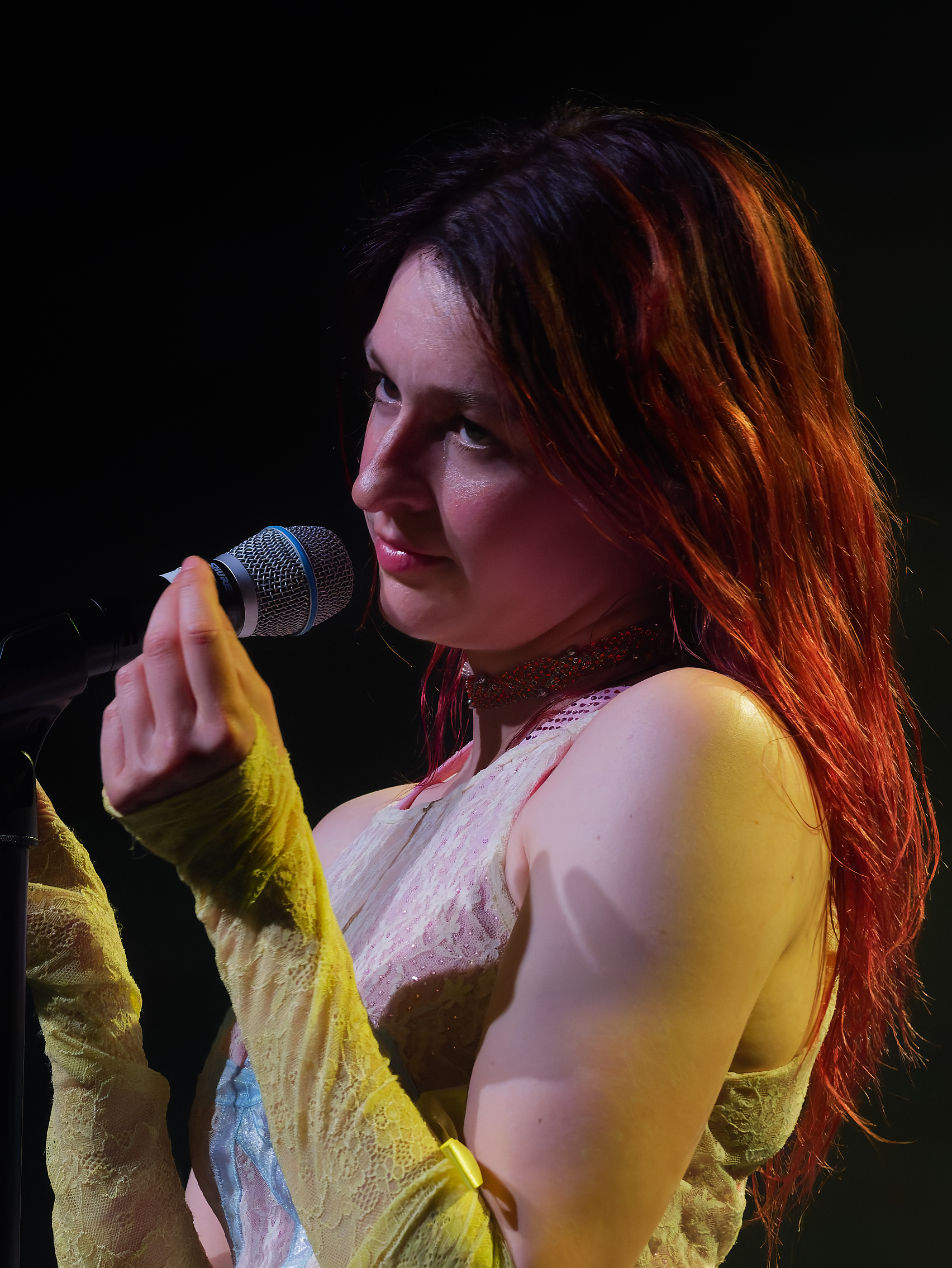
- Lou-Adriane Cassidy performing in 2026

Background information
- Born: 11 July 1997 (age 29); Quebec City, Quebec, Canada
- Genres: Folk; folk rock; indie pop
- Occupations: Singer; songwriter
- Years active: Since 2017
- Label: Bravo Musique

Lou-Adriane Cassidy-Lacasse, known professionally as Lou-Adriane Cassidy (born July 11, 1997) is a French-Canadian singer-songwriter from Quebec.

== Discography ==
Cassidy was the performer of "Ça va ça va" ('It's okay, it's okay'), which was a SOCAN Songwriting Prize nominee in 2018 for songwriter Philémon Cimon, but she is perhaps most noted for her song "La fin du monde à tous les jours" ('The end of the world everyday'), which was shortlisted for the 2020 SOCAN Songwriting Prize.

Her debut album, C'est la fin du monde à tous les jours, was released in 2019. In 2021, she came out with her second album, Lou-Adriane Cassidy vous dit : Bonsoir.

In 2025 she released the album Journal d'un Loup-Garou, which was shortlisted for the 2025 Polaris Music Prize, and won the Juno Award for Francophone Album of the Year at the Juno Awards of 2026.

Triste Animal was longlisted for the 2026 Polaris Music Prize.

== Contests ==
Cassidy was a competitor in the fourth season of La Voix in 2016, competing on Éric Lapointe's team before being eliminated from the competition in episode 10. In 2018, she was a competitor in the Francouvertes contest, where she and her songwriting collaborators Philémon Cimon and Stéphanie Boulay won the Paroles & Musique Award.
