= Alexe Gaudreault =

Canadian singer

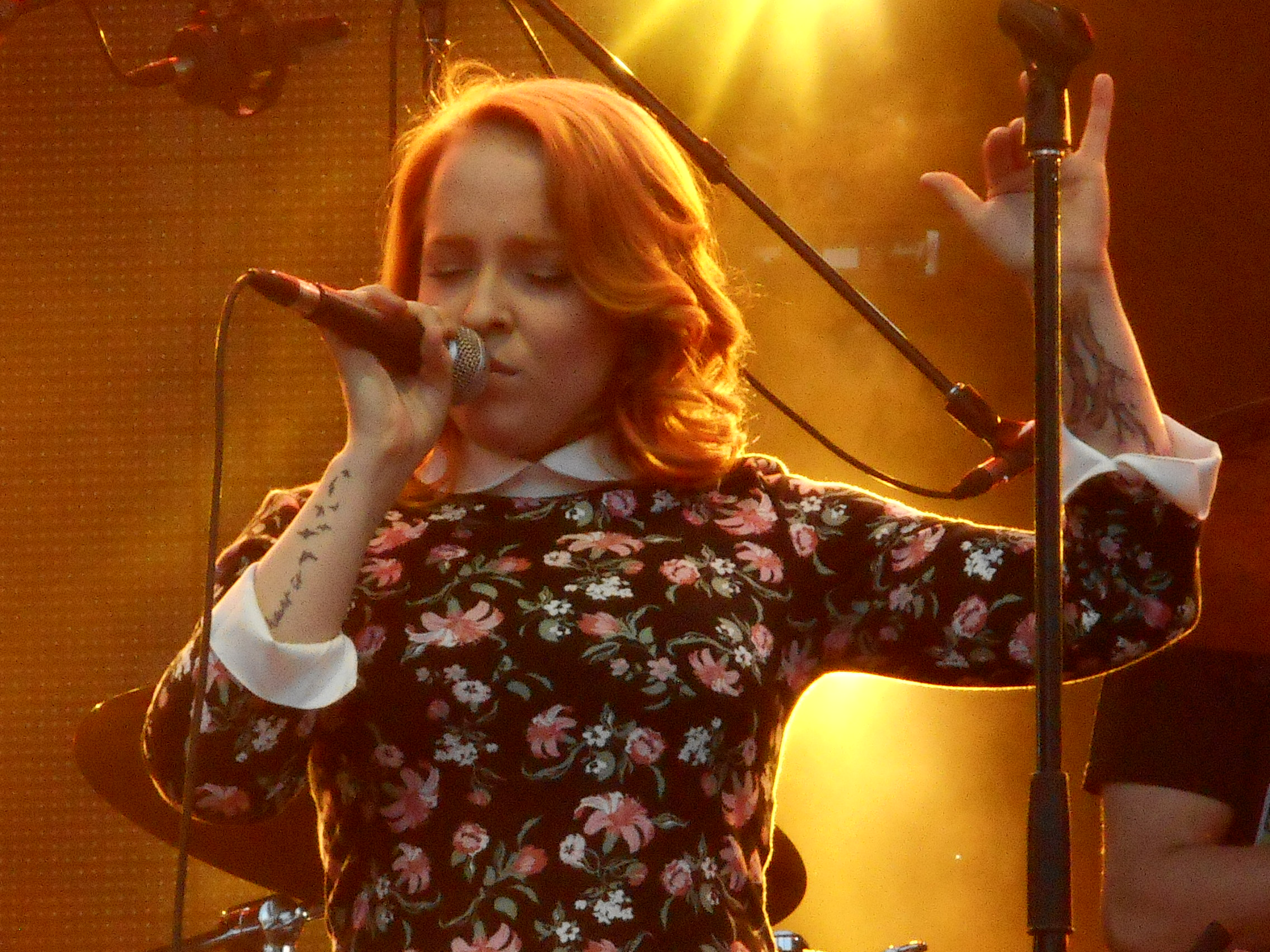
- Born: Dolbeau-Mistassini, Canada
- Occupation: singer

Alexe Gaudreault is a Canadian pop singer from Dolbeau-Mistassini, Quebec. She gained recognition in 2013 as a participant in the first season of La Voix as a member of Marc Dupré's team. She became the first independent artist in fifteen years to reach number one on the BDS chart with her 2015 song "Placebo".

== Musical career ==
During the "Blind Auditions" round of La Voix, Gaudreault sang "Quand on n'a que l'amour" by Jacques Brel. She was selected by two out of the four coaches, Marie-Mai and Marc Dupré, and she chose Dupré as her coach. Gaudreault was eliminated from the show during the second live round. Although she did not win the competition, she was offered a record deal with Disques Musicor. Shortly after her time on La Voix, she moved to the Rosemont–La Petite-Patrie borough of Montreal to help her career.

Gaudreault released a three-song EP called Placebo in June 2015. One of the songs, "Placebo", became a commercial hit, staying at number one on the BDS radio charts for seven consecutive weeks and remained in the top ten for forty-six weeks.

Gaudreault released her eponymous album in May 2016, which was mastered by Tom Coyne. The album includes the singles "Placebo" and "Éclat". "Éclat" reached the top three of the BDS charts. Also in 2016, she performed with Dupré and other La Voix alumni at the Bell Centre for the Les Francos de Montréal festival, where she performed her two singles.

Gaudreault is a two-time SOCAN Songwriting Prize nominee, receiving nods in 2016 for "Placebo" and in 2017 for "Éclat".

== Discography ==
- Placebo (2015)
- Alexe Gaudreault (2016)
