= Alejandra Ribera =

Canadian pop and jazz singer-songwriter

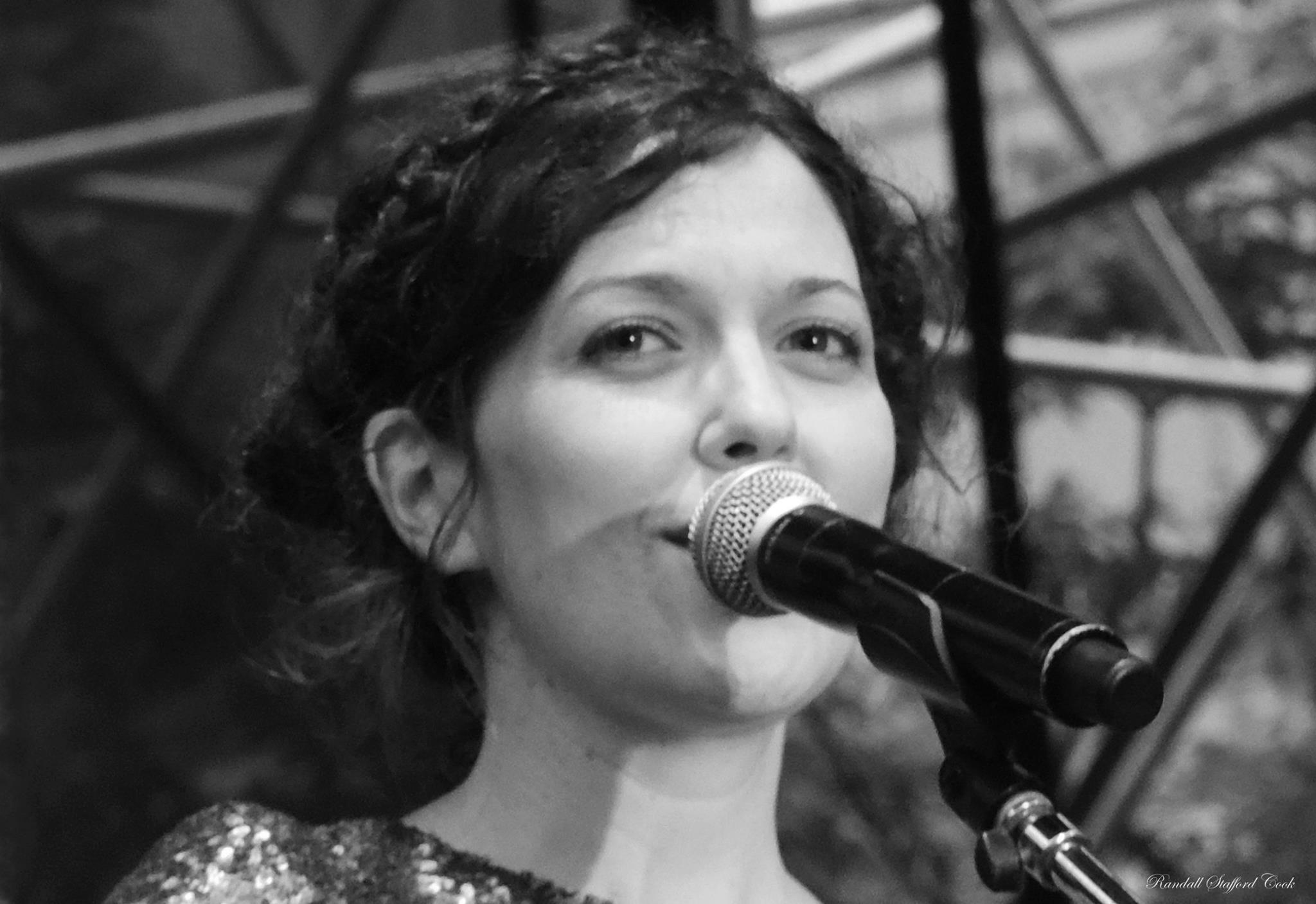
- Ribera at Luminato 2014

Background information
- Born: Toronto, Ontario
- Origin: Canada
- Genres: Indie pop, jazz, Latin music
- Occupation: singer
- Instrument: Vocals
- Years active: 2000s-present
- Website: alejandraribera.com

Alejandra Ribera is a Canadian pop and jazz singer-songwriter, who performs material in English, French and Spanish.

Of mixed Argentine and Scottish descent, Ribera was born and raised in Toronto, Ontario, and has been professionally based in Montreal, Quebec. She released her debut album, Navigator/Navigateher, in 2009, and followed up with La Boca in 2014. NPR's Alt.Latino referred to La Boca and her voice as Alt.Latino's favorite of 2014.

In 2014, Ribera's song "I Want" won the SOCAN Songwriting Prize, an annual competition that honours the best song written and released by 'emerging' songwriters over the past year, as voted by the public.

Her third album, This Island, was released in 2017.
