= Monsune =

Canadian indie pop musician

- Born: Scott Zhang
- Origin: Toronto, Ontario, Canada
- Genres: Bedroom pop; Soul
- Occupations: Singer; songwriter; record producer
- Instruments: Piano; drum; guitar; trumpet

Scott Zhang, performing under the stage name Monsune, is a Canadian indie pop and synthpop musician from Toronto, Ontario. He is noted for his 2019 single "Mountain", which was a nominee for the SOCAN Songwriting Prize in 2020. However in recent years is his song "OUTTA MY MIND" (which has amassed over 30 million views on youtube) has gained him far more recognition and popularity.

Zhang released "Nothing in Return", his debut single as Monsune, in 2017. He followed up with the EP Tradition in 2019. Other notable work includes co-producing "Race My Mind" from Drake's sixth studio album, Certified Lover Boy, and "Saturn" from SZA's second studio album re-issue, Lana.

When he launched his music career, he was a student in radio and television arts at Ryerson University.

== Discography ==
=== Studio albums ===
Title	Details	Track list	Ref.
Sure	Released: November 6, 2026; Label: Monsune; Format: digital download, streaming	1. "Whatever Sets You Free"; 2. "Sure"; 3. "Wouldn't Say"; 4. "Controller"; 5. "The Barrier"; 6. "When I Get To You"; 7. "Changeling"; 8. "(Reprise)"; 9. "Pearl"; 10. "Blissed"	

=== Extended plays ===
Title	Details	Track list	Ref.
Tradition	Released: September 20, 2019; Label: Monsune; Format: digital download, streaming	1. "1998"; 2. "CLOUD"; 3. "OUTTA MY MIND"; 4. "MOUNTAIN"; 5. "JADE"	

=== Singles ===
- "Nothing in Return" (2017)
- "Sure" (2026)
- "Wouldn't Say" (2026)

== Production discography ==
List of song production, with selected information
Year	Artist	Album	Song
2024	Luna Li	When a Thought Grows Wings	"Confusion Song" (produced with Andrew Lapin)
2024	Sza	Lana	"Saturn" (produced with Carter Lang, Rob Bisel, & Solomonophonic)
2022	MONEYPHONE	Coming Back Around	“Coming Back Around” (produced with Bad Child, MONEYPHONE & Monsune)
2021	Drake	Certified Lover Boy	
2021	Fousheé	time machine	"my slime" (produced with Jonah Yano, & Noah Williamson)

2022
