= Anemone (band) =

Canadian psychedelic pop band

- Origin: Montreal, Quebec, Canada
- Genres: psychedelic, pop
- Years active: 2015–present
- Label: Luminelle Recordings
- Members: Chloé Soldevila; Miles Dupire-Gagnon; Gabriel Lambert; Samuel Gemme
- Past members: Zach Irving

Anemone is a psychedelic pop quintet, styled "ANEMONE" and mispronounced, which formed in Montreal, Quebec in September 2015. Named after the song "Anemone" by The Brian Jonestown Massacre, it is fronted by the pianist and singer Chloé Soldevila, a Montreal native with classical training in the flute and piano. The band's compositions feature both baroque influences and counter melody.

Their line-up was Soldevila, drummer Miles Dupire-Gagnon (also of Elephant Stone), guitarist Gabriel Lambert, bass guitarist Samuel Gemme, and guitarist and backing vocalist Zach Irving, who left the band in 2020. They have been called Montreal's best new psych band, and topped Paste magazine's list of the ten bands they were most excited to see at the 2019 Treefort Music Fest in Boise, Idaho, as well as being second on Inlander's must-see list.

In 2018, Anemone released the EP Baby Only You & I. In 2019, they released their debut album Beat My Distance, which received luke-warm reviews. However, also in 2019, they received a SOCAN Songwriting Prize nomination for the song "She's the One".

== Discography ==
- Baby Only You & I (EP), (Luminelle, 2018)
- Beat My Distance (Luminelle, 2019)
