= Beyries (singer) =

Canadian musician

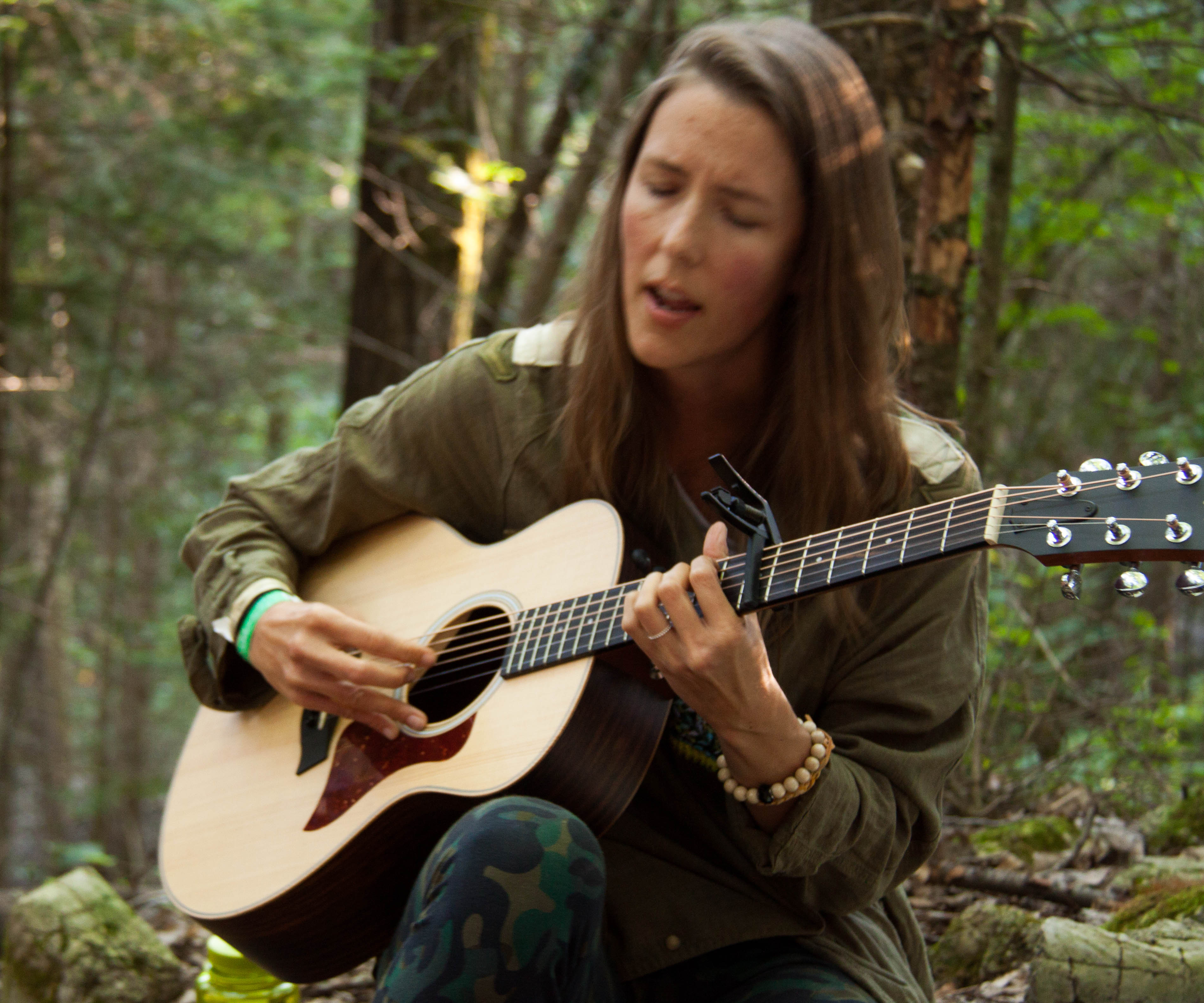
- Beyries concert in the forest 2017

Background information
- Born: Amélie Beyries; 1979 (age 46–47); Montreal, Quebec, Canada
- Genres: Folk, folk-pop
- Occupations: Singer, songwriter
- Instruments: Vocals, guitar, piano
- Years active: 2016–present
- Label: Bonsound
- Website: beyriesmusic.com

Amélie Beyries, professionally known as Beyries, is a Canadian folk-pop singer and songwriter from Montreal, Quebec. Her debut album, Landing, was released in 2017 and her sophomore album, Encounter, in 2020.

== Biography ==
Beyries was born and raised in the Montreal neighborhood of Outremont. She worked in public relations until age 28 when she was diagnosed with breast cancer. While undergoing treatment, she began writing songs to deal with her emotions, and eventually worked with producer Alex McMahon to complete her first album.

On February 24, 2017, Beyries released her debut studio album, Landing. Although Beyries is francophone, the album is predominantly in English, except for the song "J'aurai cent ans", a duet with Louis-Jean Cormier which was co-written by Beyries and Maxime Le Flaguais. Beyries was a shortlisted nominee for the 2017 SOCAN Songwriting Prize in the French-language division for "J'aurai cent ans".

Her second studio album, Encounter, was released on November 13, 2020.

== Accolades ==
Year	Organization	Accolade	Artist/work	Ranking	Source
2017	Pop Magazine	Best Albums of 2017	Landing	16	
2020	Pop Magazine	Best Songs of 2020	"Out of Touch"	19	

== Discography ==
=== Studio albums ===
- Landing (2017)
- Encounter (2020)
- Du feu dans les lilas (2024)
- Reprises (2025)

=== Singles ===
- "Je pars à l'autre bout du monde" (2016)
- "Maman" (2017)
- "Au-delà des mots" (2017)
- "Si j'étais un homme" (2018)
- "Out of Touch" (2020)
- "Over Me" (2020)
- "Valhalla Dancer" (2021)
