= Lisa LeBlanc =

Canadian folk musician (born 1990)

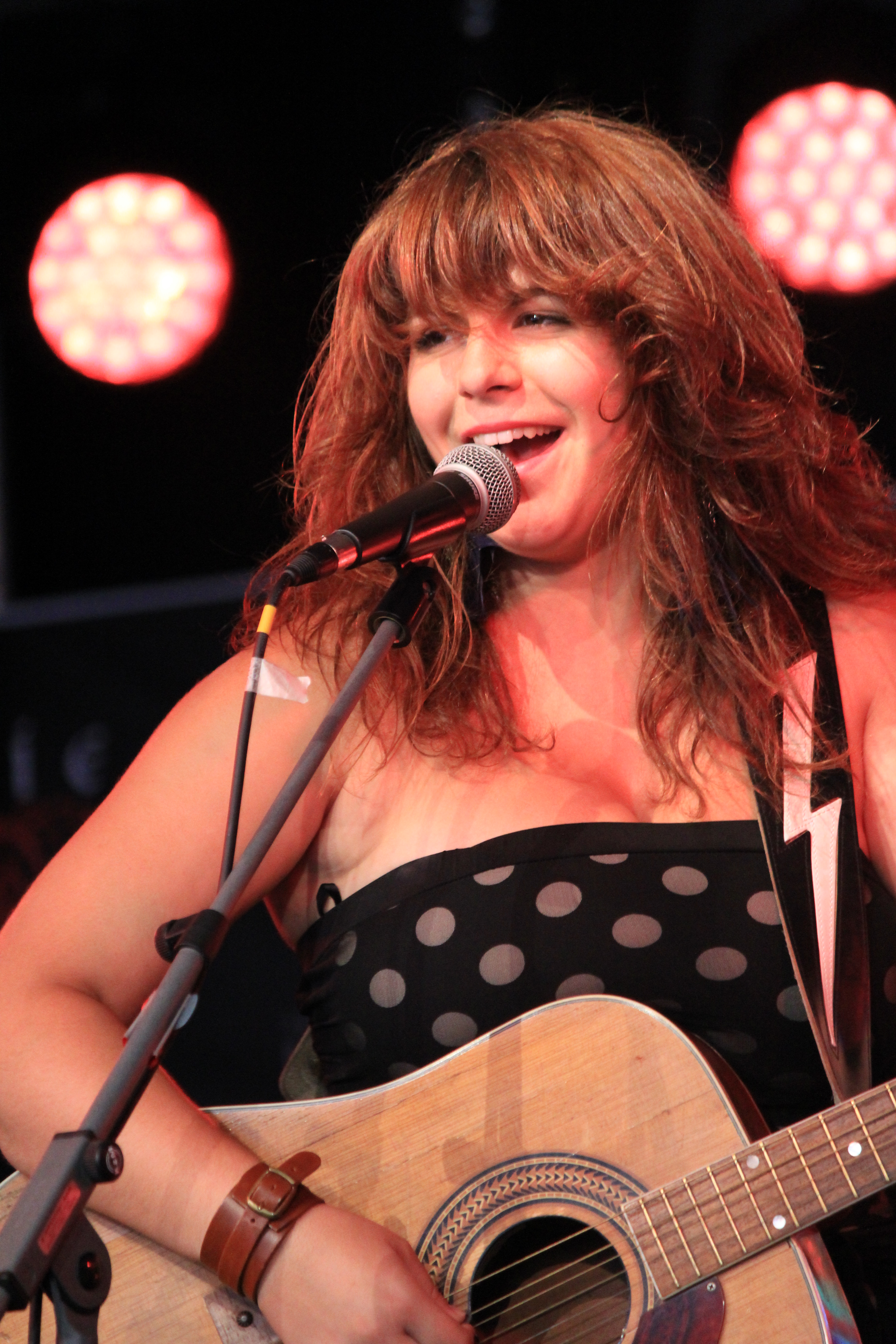
- Lisa LeBlanc during the Festival Interceltique de Lorient in 2012

Background information
- Born: August 13, 1990 (age 36); Rosaireville, New Brunswick, Canada
- Genres: Folk, rock, trash-folk
- Years active: 2004–present
- Label: Bonsound

Lisa LeBlanc (born August 13, 1990), is a Canadian singer-songwriter and banjoist, known for her enthusiastic "trash folk" performances. She has been noted for her "distinct" blend of folk, rock, and disco with both English and French language lyrics combined with chiac and her Acadian accent. Her accolades include two Félix Awards and an East Coast Music Award. She has also been nominated for three Juno Awards, the SOCAN Songwriting Prize, and shortlisted for the Polaris Music Prize twice.

== Early life ==
LeBlanc was born in Rosaireville, New Brunswick. She is of Acadian heritage, and comes from a family of music lovers.

== Musical career ==
=== 2004–2014: Origins and Lisa LeBlanc ===
LeBlanc composed her first pieces around the age of fourteen. She was playing at local events and Miramichi's O'Donaghues bar, with her mother watching her because she was underage. LeBlanc was recognized as an outstanding guitarist and a promising singer-songwriter when she won the Festival International de la Chanson de Granby in September 2010. This juried award brought her to the attention of the country's francophone media. She has also played at the 2011 Coup de cœur francophone, at the FrancoFolies of Montreal and at the Festival d'été de Québec.

LeBlanc's self-titled debut album Lisa LeBlanc was released in 2012. The majority of LeBlanc's first album was written in Rosaireville, in Granby during her studies at l'École nationale de la chanson, as well as in Montreal, where she was living. Released on Bonsound Records, the album was recorded by Louis-Jean Cormier of Karkwa at Studio Piccolo. Lisa LeBlanc charted in both Canada and France and has been certified platinum by Music Canada.

The album became best known for the single "Aujourd'hui ma vie c'est d'la marde" ("Today My Life Is Shit"). The album earned LeBlanc a nomination for the Francophone Album of the Year at the 2013 Juno Awards, as well as nominations for three Félix Awards including Critics Choice Album of the Year, two Canadian Folk Music Awards, and an East Coast Music Award.

A song from the album, "Lignes d'hydro", was also nominated for the SOCAN Songwriting Prize. Along with the nominations for Lisa LeBlanc Leblanc was also nominated for Female Performer of the Year at the 2012 and 2013 Félix Awards,"ADISQ 2013" /> She also won Revelation de l'année at the 2012 awards.

=== 2014–2021: Why You Wanna Leave, Runaway Queen? and extended plays ===
In 2014, LeBlanc released Highways, Heartaches and Time Well Wasted, an English EP, which debuted at number seven on the Canadian Albums Chart, selling 3,400 copies. She was also nominated for two Félix Awards that year as well as the SOCAN Songwriting Prize the following year.

She released her second studio album, Why You Wanna Leave, Runaway Queen?, on September 30, 2016. The album included both French and English titles, including a thrash-folk cover of Motörhead's classic heavy metal song "Ace of Spades". It peaked at eight on the Canadian Albums Chart, becoming her third top 10 record in a row. The album was shortlisted for the 2017 Polaris Music Prize. It also earned LeBlanc her second Juno Award nomination for Contemporary Roots Album of the Year. The album also earned LeBlanc four nominations at the Félix Awards and a nomination for Contemporary Singer at the Canadian Folk Music Awards.

In 2018 she also collaborated with Joseph Edgar, Robin-Joël Cool, Wanabi Farmeur, Vishtèn, Caroline Savoie, and Édith Butler on the album Grand tintamarre ! - Chansons et comptines acadiennes, which won the Canadian Folk Music Award for Children's Album of the Year at the 14th Canadian Folk Music Awards.

In 2020, under the pseudonym Belinda, LeBlanc released It's Not a Game, It's a Lifestyle, a five-song EP of disco songs about bingo.

=== 2021–present: Chiac Disco ===
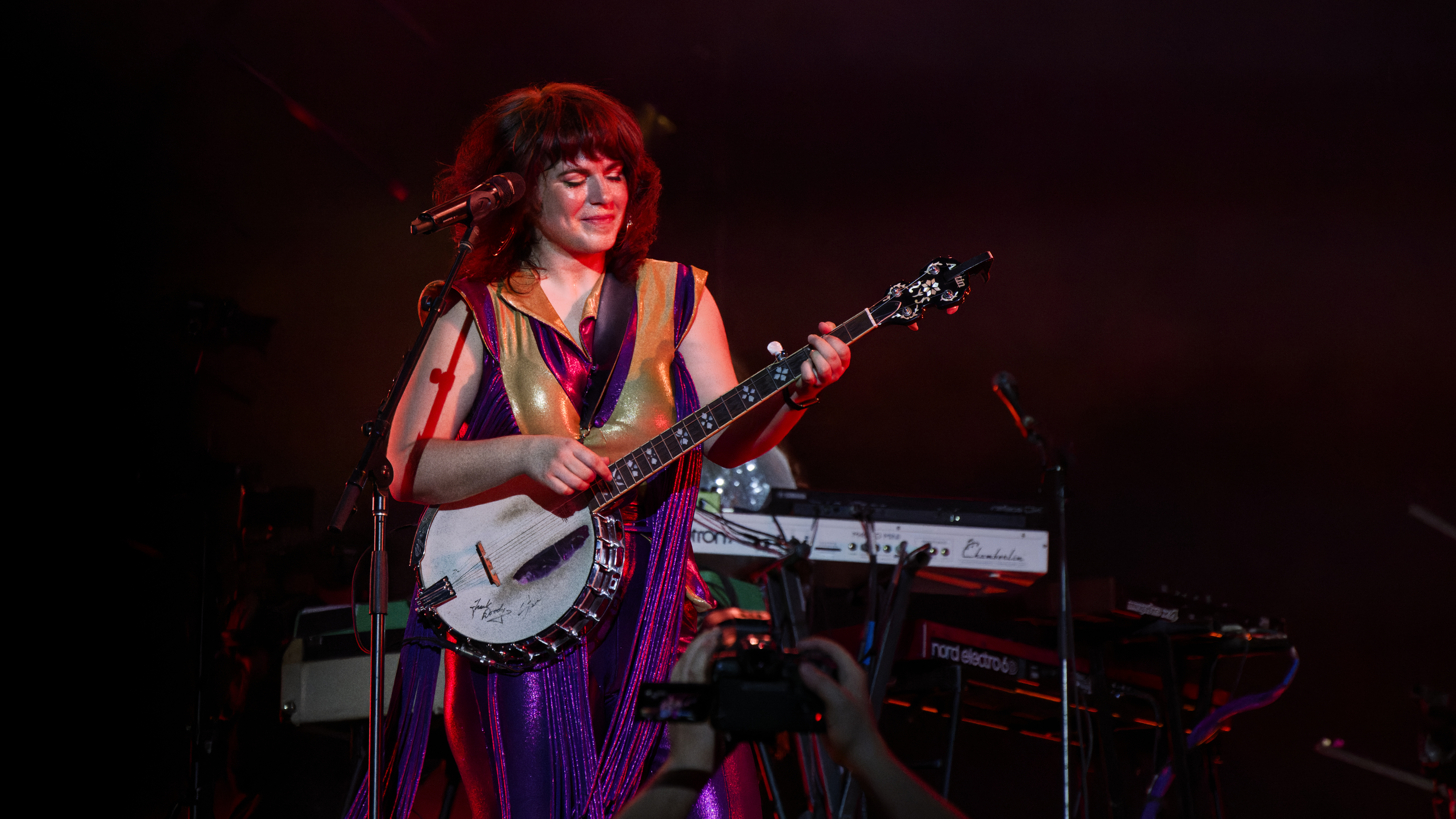
Lisa LeBlanc performing Chiac Disco, at the banjo, during her main event at FrancoFolies de Montréal, June 2023.

In March 2022, LeBlanc released her third studio album Chiac Disco. The album's name and lyrics take inspiration from Chiac, a French Creole dialect common within Acadian communities of New Brunswick. It also followed the disco influence of It's Not a Game, It's a Lifestyle. The album became her fourth to chart on the Canadian Albums Chart, peaking at twenty four.

Chiac Disco was a Juno Award nominee for Francophone Album of the Year at the Juno Awards of 2023, becoming her second nomination in the category and third Juno nomination. Chiac Disco earned LeBlanc her second Félix Award, winning Pop Album of the Year. It was also nominated for Critics Choice Album of the Year. At the 43rd Félix Awards, she was also nominated for Songwriter of the Year and Female Performer of the Year, along with "Pourquoi faire aujourd'hui" being nominated for Song of the Year. Chiac Disco was shortlisted for the Polaris Music Prize in 2022, becoming her second shortlisted album after Why You Wanna Leave, Runaway Queen?

In 2023, LeBlanc received nominations at the East Coast Music Awards for the first time since 2013. They included three nominations for Chiac Disco, Song of the Year for "Pourquoi faire aujourd'hui", and for TD's Fan Choice Entertainer of the Year. She won for Francophone Recording of the Year.

== Discography ==
=== Studio albums ===
| Title | Details | Peak positions | | Certification |
| Title | Details | CAN | FRA | Certification |
|---|---|---|---|---|
| Lisa LeBlanc | Released: March 27, 2012; Label: Bonsound Records; Formats: LP, CD, digital download, streaming | 8 | 101 | MC: Platinum |
| Why You Wanna Leave, Runaway Queen? | Released: September 30, 2016; Label: Bonsound Records; Formats: LP, CD, digital download, streaming | 8 | — | |
| Chiac Disco | Released: March 18, 2022; Label: Bonsound Records; Formats: LP, CD, digital download, streaming | 24 | — | |

=== Extended plays ===
| Year | Details | Peak positions |
| Year | Details | CAN |
|---|---|---|
| Highways, Heartaches and Time Well Wasted | Released: November 4, 2014; Label: Bonsound Records; Formats: LP, CD, digital download, streaming | 7 |
| It's Not a Game, It's a Lifestyle (as Belinda) | Released: June 14, 2020; Label: Bonsound Records; Formats: Digital download, streaming | — |

=== Singles ===
| Title | Year | Album |
|---|---|---|
| "Aujourd'hui, ma vie c'est d'la marde" | 2012 | Lisa LeBlanc |
| "Cerveau ramolli" | 2012 | Lisa LeBlanc |
| "J'pas un cowboy" | 2014 | Lisa LeBlanc |
| "You Look Like Trouble (But I Guess I Do Too)" | 2015 | Highways, Heartaches and Time Well Wasted |
| "Gold Diggin' Hoedown" | 2015 | Highways, Heartaches and Time Well Wasted |
| "Dump the Guy ASAP" | 2016 | Why You Wanna Leave, Runaway Queen? |
| "City Slickers and Country Boys" | 2017 | Why You Wanna Leave, Runaway Queen? |
| "I Love You, I Don't Love You, I Love You" | 2017 | Why You Wanna Leave, Runaway Queen? |
| "Ace of Spades" | 2017 | Why You Wanna Leave, Runaway Queen? |
| "It's Not a Game, It's a Lifestyle" (as Belinda) | 2020 | It's Not a Game, It's a Lifestyle |
| "Mon Sport Préféré" (as Belinda, featuring Johanne) | 2020 | It's Not a Game, It's a Lifestyle |
| "In It to Win It" (as Belinda, featuring Jalapeño Papa) | 2020 | Non-album singles |
| "Bonsoir Moreau" (featuring Salebarbes) | 2021 | Non-album singles |
| "Pourquoi faire aujourd'hui" | 2021 | Chiac Disco |
| "Entre toi pi moi pi la corde de bois" | 2021 | Chiac Disco |
| "Me semble que c'est facile" | 2022 | Chiac Disco |
| "Gossip" | 2022 | Chiac Disco |
| "Quoi-ce tu fais ça pour?" | 2023 | TBA |

=== As a featured artist ===
| Title | Year | Album |
|---|---|---|
| "Dans l'bois" (Édith Butler featuring Lisa LeBlanc) | 2021 | Le tour du Grand Bois |
| "Pourquoi faire aujourd'hui [Remix]" (Poirier featuring Lisa LeBlanc) | 2023 | Non-album single |

=== Guest appearances ===
| Title | Year | Other artist(s) | Album |
|---|---|---|---|
| "Le coeur a des dents" | 2012 | Yann Perreau | À genoux dans le désir |
| "Marie Mouri" | 2021 | Édith Butler | Le tour du Grand Bois |
| "Ti-gars" | 2021 | Édith Butler | Le tour du Grand Bois |

== Awards and nominations ==
| Year | Association | Award | Work | Result | Ref. |
|---|---|---|---|---|---|
| 2012 | SOCAN Songwriting Prize | Francophone | "Lignes d'hydro" (Note: for Joël Vaudreuil) | Nominated | |
| 2012 | Félix Awards | Female Performer | Herself | Nominated | |
| 2012 | Félix Awards | Revelation of the Year | Herself | Won | |
| 2012 | Félix Awards | Critics Choice Album of the Year | Lisa LeBlanc | Nominated | |
| 2012 | Félix Awards | Folk Album | Lisa LeBlanc | Nominated | |
| 2012 | Félix Awards | Songwriter or Composer | Lisa LeBlanc | Nominated | |
| 2012 | Canadian Folk Music Awards | French Songwriter | Lisa LeBlanc | Nominated | |
| 2012 | Canadian Folk Music Awards | New/Emerging Artist | Lisa LeBlanc | Nominated | |
| 2013 | Juno Awards | Francophone Album | Lisa LeBlanc | Nominated | |
| 2013 | East Coast Music Awards | Francophone Recording | Lisa LeBlanc | Nominated | |
| 2013 | Félix Awards | Female Performer | Herself | Nominated | |
| 2014 | Félix Awards | Quebec Artist with Most Success Outside Quebec | Herself | Nominated | |
| 2014 | Félix Awards | Female Performer | Herself | Nominated | |
| 2015 | SOCAN Songwriting Prize | Anglophone | "You Look Like Trouble (But I Guess I Do Too)" | Nominated | |
| 2017 | Polaris Music Prize | | Why You Wanna Leave, Runaway Queen? | Shortlisted | |
| 2017 | Canadian Folk Music Awards | Contemporary Singer | Why You Wanna Leave, Runaway Queen? | Nominated | |
| 2017 | Juno Awards | Contemporary Roots Album | Why You Wanna Leave, Runaway Queen? | Nominated | |
| 2017 | Félix Awards | Anglophone Album | Why You Wanna Leave, Runaway Queen? | Nominated | |
| 2017 | Félix Awards | Spectacle - Anglophone | Why You Wanna Leave, Runaway Queen? | Nominated | |
| 2017 | Félix Awards | Sound Recording and Mixing | Herself (Note: with Joseph Donovan, Benoit Morier, Nicolas Petrowski, and Francis Bélanger) | Nominated | |
| 2017 | Félix Awards | Record Producer | Herself (Note: with Joseph Donovan) | Nominated | |
| 2022 | Félix Awards | Female Artist | Herself | Nominated | |
| 2022 | Félix Awards | Song of the Year | "Pourquoi faire aujourd'hui" | Nominated | |
| 2022 | Félix Awards | Songwriter of the Year | Herself, for Chiac Disco (Note: with Benoit Morier, Michel Roy, and Léandre Bourgeois) | Nominated | |
| 2022 | Félix Awards | Critics Choice Album of the Year | Chiac Disco | Nominated | |
| 2022 | Félix Awards | Pop Album | Chiac Disco | Won | |
| 2022 | Polaris Music Prize | | Chiac Disco | Shortlisted | |
| 2023 | Juno Awards | Francophone Album | Chiac Disco | Nominated | |
| 2023 | East Coast Music Awards | Francophone Recording | Chiac Disco | Won | |
| 2023 | East Coast Music Awards | Pop Recording | Chiac Disco | Nominated | |
| 2023 | East Coast Music Awards | Solo Recording | Chiac Disco | Nominated | |
| 2023 | East Coast Music Awards | Song of the Year | "Pourquoi faire aujourd'hui" | Nominated | |
| 2023 | East Coast Music Awards | TD's Fan Choice Entertainer of the Year | Herself | Nominated | |
