= Loony (musician) =

Canadian musician

LOONY is the stage name of Kira Huszar, a Canadian rhythm and blues singer from Scarborough, Ontario. She is most noted for her 2021 EP, soft thing, which was longlisted for the 2022 Polaris Music Prize.

She was previously a SOCAN Songwriting Prize nominee in 2020 for her single "Some Kinda Love".

Elton John took a special shine to her on his Apple Radio show "Rocket Hour", playing a handful of her songs and interviewing her on the podcast in late 2022. "I love that LOONY!" he exclaimed. "She's one of my favourite artists coming out of Canada."

In 2023 she participated in an all-star recording of Serena Ryder's single "What I Wouldn't Do", which was released as a charity single to benefit Kids Help Phone's Feel Out Loud campaign for youth mental health.

In January 2024, LOONY's song 'raw' was majorly sampled by Metro Boomin on 21 Savage and Burna Boi's song "just like me" on his album "american dream".

Her 2023 self-titled album was a longlisted nominee for the 2024 Polaris Music Prize.

== Discography ==
- Part 1 (2018)
- JOYRiDE (2020)
- soft thing (2021)
- LOONY (2024)
