= Just John x Dom Dias =

Canadian hip hop musical group

Just John x Dom Dias are a Canadian hip hop duo from Toronto, Ontario, consisting of rapper John Samuels and producer Dominique Dias. They are most noted for their song "Soundboi", which was a shortlisted nominee for the SOCAN Songwriting Prize in 2019.

They formed in early 2018 after the duo met on Instagram; both Samuels and Dias were already active in Toronto's music scene, with Samuels releasing the solo hip hop EP Black Beret in 2017 and Dias active as a club DJ.

They released the EP Don in June, and followed up with the EP Don II in November. The third and final EP in the trilogy, Don III, followed in April 2019. In November 2019, they released the full-length album PROJECT.
