= Gazoline =

Canadian rock band

- Origin: Chicoutimi (Saguenay), Quebec, Canada
- Genres: Rock, new wave, pop, punk
- Years active: 2012–present
- Labels: L-Abe, Ambiances Ambiguës
- Members: Xavier Thériault, JC Tellier, Jean-Philippe Godbout, Sam Beaulé
- Past members: David Dufour, Marc-André Landry
- Website: http://www.gazolinemusique.com

Gazoline is a Canadian rock band from Chicoutimi, Quebec (now Saguenay, Quebec). Its music is a mix of new wave, pop, and punk rock.

== Biography ==
=== First album ===
Created by former members of Chicoutimi band Les Horn Abbots, led by Xavier Thériault and JC Tellier, Gazoline has officially existed since 2012, with the release of the EP Futurbabymama. Working with Quebec punk rock icon Xavier Cafeïne as a producer, the musicians got significant media attention with this first production, taking them to the second place of the famous francophone contest Francouvertes 2012. After several noteworthy appearances in all major festivals in Quebec, Gazoline released its first full-length album Gazoline in March 2014, on the record label L-Abe. This new album threw the band in front of the French Canadian music scene, gaining a prized nomination in the category "Rock Album of the Year" at the 2014 ADISQ Gala as well as "Emerging french artist of the year" at the Sirius XM Awards of 2013.

Radio hit singles like "Ces gens qui dansent" and "Du feu" helped Gazoline reach a bigger audience, being featured in Quebecois prime-time shows such as Hockey Night in Canada, Tout le monde en parle, La Voix, Belle et bum and more.

=== Brûlensemble ===
The young musicians returned to the recording studio to finish their second album, Brûlensemble, after a significant Canadian tour that included more than 300 performances. Recruiting new member and long time friend Marc-André Landry on keyboards, the recent 4-piece act also saw David Dufour quitting music and being replaced by Jean-Philippe Godbout (Noem, Trio Jonathan Turgeon, TRSTSS).

Clearly distinct from the sounds of their first album, Brûlensemble showcases a somewhat less juvenile approach, mixing new wave and 1980s influences in the punk rock roots of Gazoline. Julien Mineau (Malajube, Fontarabie) was a producer on the album. Brûlensemble was nominated at the ADISQ Gala in 2017 in the Rock Album of the Year Category, as well as for the SOCAN Songwriting Prize.

In 2017, exactly one year after Brûlensemble, Yūgen was released, a five-song EP with a heavy electro synth pop feel.

== Discography ==
- 2012 - Futurbabymama - EP (Ambiances Ambiguës)
- 2014 - Gazoline (L-A be let artists be / Ambiances Ambiguës)
- 2015 - "Je cherche" (Ambiances Ambiguës) (single)
- 2016 - Brûlensemble (L-A be / Ambiances Ambiguës)
- 2017 - Yūgen (Duprince)
- 2021 - Gazoline III (Duprince)
