= Flying Hórses =

Canadian musician

- Also known as: Jade Bergeron
- Born: Canada
- Origin: Montreal, Quebec, Canada
- Years active: 2013–present
- Labels: Bonsound
- Website: flyinghorses.ca

Flying Hórses is the stage name of Canadian musician Jade Bergeron. She grew up in Sainte-Thérèse and now lives in Ottawa, Ontario.

In 2013, Bergeron began writing the music that would form her debut album, Tölt, released in 2015. Recorded in Reykjavík at Sundlaugin, with Sigur Rós and Björk producer Biggi Birgisson, the album was heavily influenced by trips to Iceland. The album received little attention in the mainstream press, but the title track would go on to be nominated for the Best Canadian Music Video Prism Prize in 2018. Alexandre Richard also won an award for his direction of the video at the Paris International Music Video Competition.

Bergeron's second album, Reverie, was recorded partially in Iceland but also in Canada and Germany, with Bergeron doing her own production. It was released in 2019 to critical acclaim. Exclaim! magazine called it “a sublime reflection on the passage of time,” saying “Reverie will open new universes within you.” The Montréal Gazette said the album was “tinged with great beauty, and an undercurrent of something graver,” and Ici Musique promised it would “pull you from your daily life, providing a dreamlike rest.”
