= Lydia Képinski =

Québécoise indie pop musician

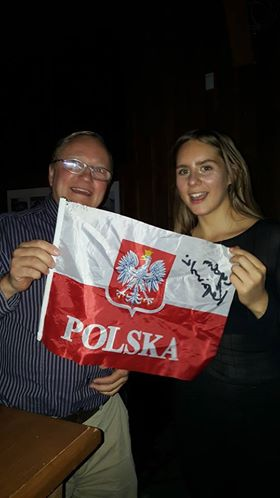

Background information
- Born: June 1, 1994
- Origin: Canada
- Genre: Pop
- Occupations: Musician, singer-songwriter
- Years active: 2017–present
- Website: https://www.lydiakepinski.com/

Lydia Képinski is a Canadian indie pop singer and songwriter from Quebec.

== Life ==
Képinski is from Montréal, Québec and has French and Polish ancestry. She taught herself guitar in high school and has studied classical piano.

== Career ==
Képinski was the winner of the Francouvertes competition in 2017. Képinski released her debut EP, EP, later that year and received a SOCAN Songwriting Prize nomination in the French division for the song "Apprendre à mentir".

She followed up in 2018 with her debut album Premier juin, which was longlisted for the 2018 Polaris Music Prize.

In 2022 Képinski released her sophomore album Depuis which was also a longlist nominee for the 2022 Polaris Music Prize. She notes that the album thematically explores the start of her music career following the success of Premier juin and adjusting to touring and increased visibility. Drag culture is a major influence on Depuis though Képinski says she does not seek to emulate the style directly out of respect for drag performers. Her first concert performance for Depuis was at South by Southwest.

== Discography ==
=== Studio albums ===
- Premier juin (2018)
- Depuis (2022)
- C'est parti! (2026)

=== Remix Albums ===
- Premier juin Remix (2019)

=== Extended Plays ===
- EP (2016)
