= Beat My Distance =

Studio album by Anemone
- Released: February 15, 2019
- Length: 41:10
- Label: Luminelle

Singles from Beat My Distance
- 1. "Daffodils" Released: August 30, 2018; 2. "She's The One" Released: November 14, 2018; 3. "Memory Lane" Released: January 17, 2019

Professional ratings
Aggregate scores
Source	Rating
Metacritic	60/100
Review scores
Source	Rating
DIY	2/5 stars
Exclaim!	7/10

Beat My Distance is the debut studio album by Canadian band Anemone. It was released on February 15, 2019, through Luminelle Records.

== Track listing ==
No.	Title	Length
1.	"On Your Own"	3:31
2.	"Daffodils"	3:53
3.	"Memory Lane"	4:51
4.	"Sunshine"	5:30
5.	"Vanilla"	4:06
6.	"She's the One"	3:13
7.	"Segue"	3:56
8.	"Endless Dive"	5:13
9.	"Only You"	6:42
