= Philémon Cimon =

Canadian singer-songwriter

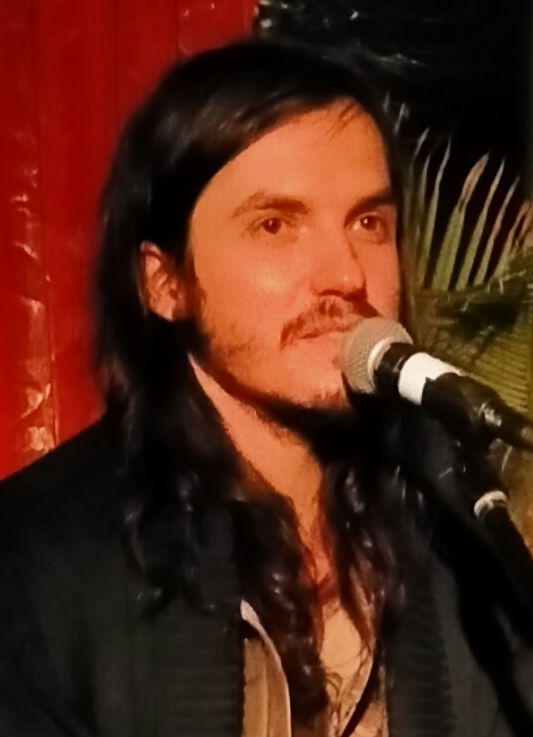
- Philémon Cimon in 2021

Background information
- Occupations: Singer; songwriter

Philémon Cimon is the stage name of Philémon Bergeron-Langlois, a Canadian singer-songwriter from Quebec. He is most noted as a two-time SOCAN Songwriting Prize nominee, receiving nominations in 2014 for his own song "Soleil blanc" and in 2019 for "Ça va ça va", which was performed by Lou-Adriane Cassidy.

He released his first two recordings, the mini-album EP 2008 (2008) and the full-length album Les Sessions cubaines (2010), under the name Philémon Chante. His first album as Philémon Cimon, L'Été, was released in 2014 and included "Soleil blanc". He released Les femmes comme des montagnes the following year, followed by the four-song EP Psychanalysez-vous avec Philémon Cimon in 2016.

Pays, his fourth full-length album, was released in 2019. The album, inspired by his childhood experiences visiting his grandmother in the Charlevoix region of Quebec, was recorded to four-track tape in the church at Saint-Joseph-de-la-Rive, and he cited Pierre Perrault's documentary film Pour la suite du monde as a key influence on the songwriting.

He released the EP Philédouche in 2020.

== Discography ==
- EP 2008 (2008)
- Les Sessions Cubaines (2010)
- L'été (2014)
- Les femmes comme des montagnes (2015)
- Psychanalysez-vous avec Philémon Cimon (2016)
- Pays (2019)
- Philédouche (2020)
- L'amour (2021)
- 8 chansons pour enfants et 2 rêves (2023)
- Mon adolescence, Vol. 1-2 (14 à 19 ans / 20 à 22 ans) (2024)

== Filmography ==
- Philémon Chante Habana (2012)
