= Laurence-Anne =

Canadian pop singer from Quebec

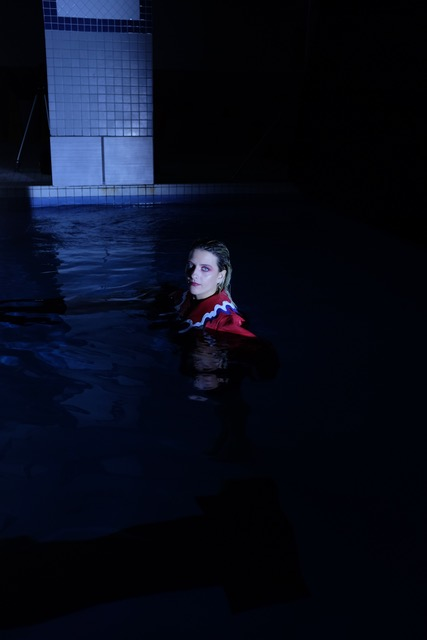
Laurence-Anne, during the shooting of the video for her song "Tempête", in March 2021, in Montreal.

Laurence-Anne Charest Gagné is a Canadian pop singer from Quebec, whose debut album Première apparition was a longlisted nominee for the 2019 Polaris Music Prize.

Originally from Saint-Pascal in the Kamouraska RCM of Quebec, Gagné was a finalist in the 2017 edition of the Francouvertes music competition. Première apparition was released independently in February 2019; and Laurence-Anne supported the album with a summer tour of Quebec. In addition to her Polaris nomination, she received a SOCAN Songwriting Prize nomination in 2020 for the song "Instant zéro".

She subsequently signed to Bonsound, which released her follow-up EP Accident in August 2020.

In addition to her solo career, she also performs as a member of the dance-punk band La Sécurité.

== Discography ==
- 2019 - Première Apparition (Duprince)
- 2020 - Accident (Ep) (Bonsound)
- 2021 - Musivision (Bonsound)
