= P'tit Belliveau =

Canadian musician

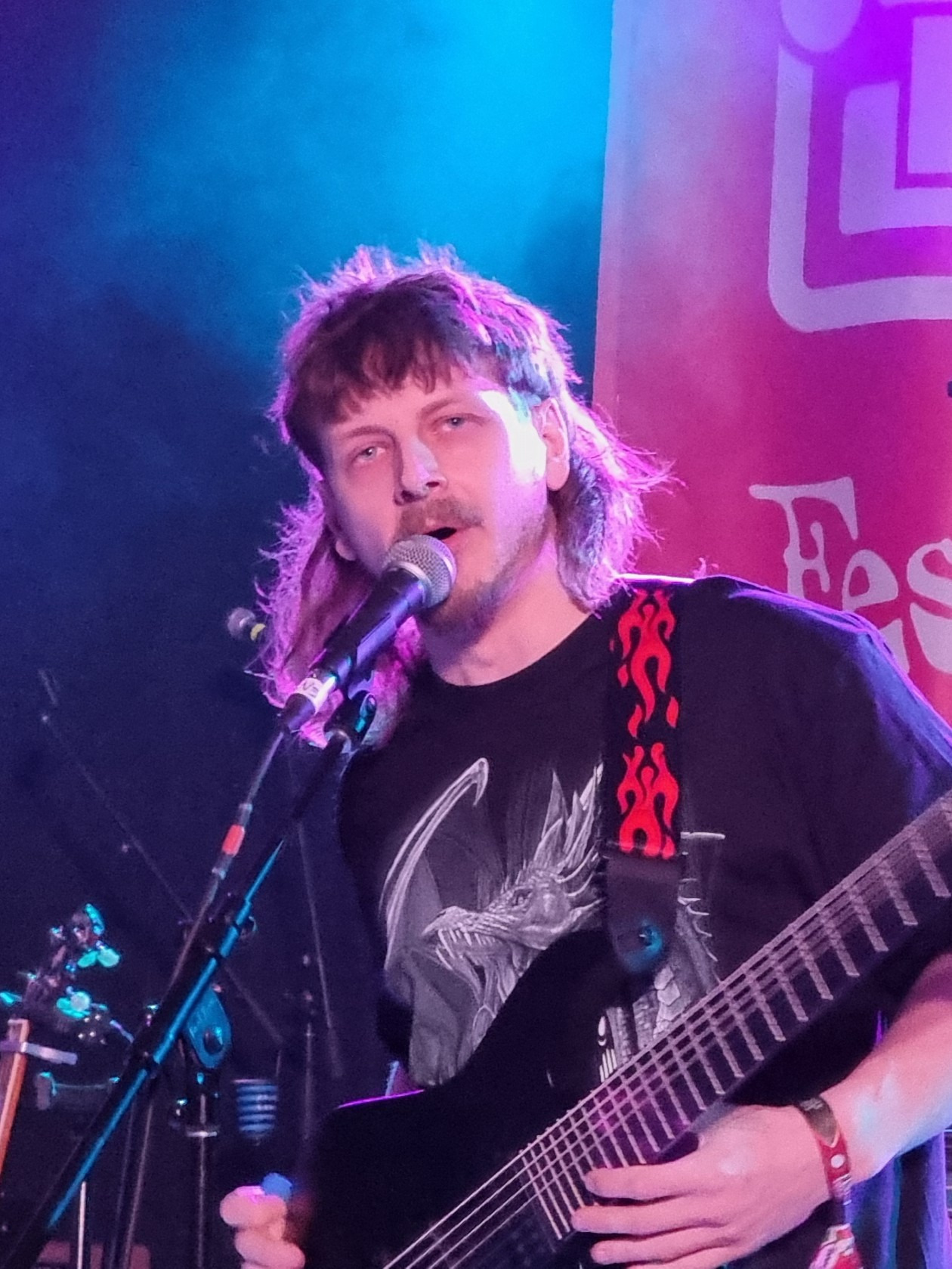
- Belliveau at the Festival du voyageur in 2025

Background information
- Born: Jonah Richard Guimond; November 8, 1995 (age 30); Fort Frances, Ontario, Canada
- Genres: Country, folk
- Occupation: Singer/songwriter

Jonah Richard Guimond (born November 8, 1995), known professionally as P'tit Belliveau, is a French-Canadian and Acadian folk and country musician from Clare, Nova Scotia. He is most noted for his 2020 album Greatest Hits Vol. 1, which was longlisted for the 2020 Polaris Music Prize.

Guimond began making electronic music as a teenager, with his music evolving toward country after he was given a banjo by his grandfather. Although now more based in bluegrass, his style still incorporates some synthesizers and drum machines.

With his band Les Grosses Coques, he was a finalist in the 2019 edition of the Francouvertes. Greatest Hits Vol. 1, his debut album, was released in March 2020.

== Biography ==
Guimond was born on November 8th, in Fort Frances, Ontario, but moved at a young age to his mother's hometown, Clare, a francophone municipality in Nova Scotia.

His passion for creating music began during his teenage years. Influenced by the hip-hop group Radio Radio, which features several members from Baie Sainte-Marie (including him), he developed an interest for electronic music. As a teenager, he also played with the indie-punk band Peter Pansbridge, which released the album Manter ketspidge in 2014, and the short-lived band Intense sound dynamite, which released two singles in 2012.

In collaboration with Tide School, Guimond began publishing his early musical creations under the pseudonym JonahMeltWave, on platforms such as YouTube and SoundCloud.

Before music became a full time career, Guimond worked in construction in the Moncton Region, New Brunswick.

The name P'tit Belliveau is an homage to his grandfather, Julien Belliveau. According to Guimond, since his grandfather was "Grand Belliveau" (Big Belliveau) that would make Guimond the "petit" (small) one.

After spending several years in Dartmouth and Moncton, Guimond returned to his native Baie Sainte-Marie in 2020 during the Covid-19 pandemic. He continues to reside there and produces his music in a home studio.

In 2023, P'tit Belliveau announced that he was leaving Bonsound. Since then, he has released music as an independent artist, in 'goblin mode' in his own words. He also announced in 2023 that he would release a new album in 2024, which became the album P'tit Belliveau, launched on the 24th of April 2024.
