= The Secret Beach =

Canadian band

The Secret Beach is a Canadian indie folk band from Winnipeg, Manitoba, whose core member is singer-songwriter Micah Erenberg. They are most noted as Juno Award nominees for Adult Alternative Album of the Year at the Juno Awards of 2025, for their album We Were Born Here, What's Your Excuse?.

Originally from the small town of Matlock, Manitoba, Erenberg began his career as a solo artist with the 2016 album Poor Mic's Toe. The album was led by "Morphine", a song that spun his real-life experience losing part of his left big toe in a lawnmower accident at age 12 into a darkly comedic account of a fictionalized descent into hardcore drug and alcohol addiction. He followed up with several further solo albums before releasing Songs From the Secret Beach, his first album under the band moniker, in 2022.

We Were Born Here, What's Your Excuse? followed in 2024.

== Discography ==
=== Micah Erenberg ===
- Poor Mic's Toe - 2016
- Love Is Gonna Find You - 2019
- HBD Michael Toronto - 2020
- Art Week (the album) - 2020
- For the Ones Who Love Me Now - 2021
- Frozen in Time - 2021

=== The Secret Beach ===
- Songs from the Secret Beach - 2022
- We Were Born Here, What's Your Excuse? - 2024
