= Jonah Yano =

Canadian musician

- Born: Hiroshima, Japan
- Occupations: Musician; singer-songwriter
- Works: Souvenir (2020); Portrait of a Dog (2023)

Jonah Yano is a Canadian musician. He is most noted as a two-time SOCAN Songwriting Prize nominee, receiving nods in 2021 for "Delicate" and in 2023 for "Always".

Born in Hiroshima, Japan, and raised in Vancouver, British Columbia, he is currently based in Montreal, Quebec.

A frequent collaborator with BadBadNotGood, he released his debut full-length album Souvenir in 2020, and followed up with Portrait of a Dog in 2023. His 2023 set at the Montreal Jazz Festival saw him compared to "a jazzier Homeshake or a funkier Andy Shauf".

In late 2023, he released the non-album single "Concentrate". In 2024, he collaborated with Ouri on her single "Quiet Drumming".
