= Rosie Valland =

Canadian singer-songwriter

- Origin: Granby, Quebec, Canada
- Genre: pop
- Occupation: singer-songwriter
- Instrument: vocals
- Years active: 2010s-present

Rosie Valland is a Canadian singer-songwriter from Granby, Quebec. She is most noted as a two-time SOCAN Songwriting Prize nominee, receiving nominations in 2016 for "Olympe" and in 2017 for "Nord-Est".

Valland studied music at the École internationale de la chanson de Granby before releasing a self-titled EP in 2014. Her full-length debut album, Partir avant, followed in 2015. She then followed up with the EPs Nord-Est in 2016 and Synchro in 2017, before releasing her second full-length album Blue in 2020.

== Discography ==
- Rosie Valland (2014)
- Partir avant (2015)
- Nord-Est (2016)
- Synchro (2017)
- Blue (2020)
- Emmanuelle (2022)
