= Les Sœurs Boulay =

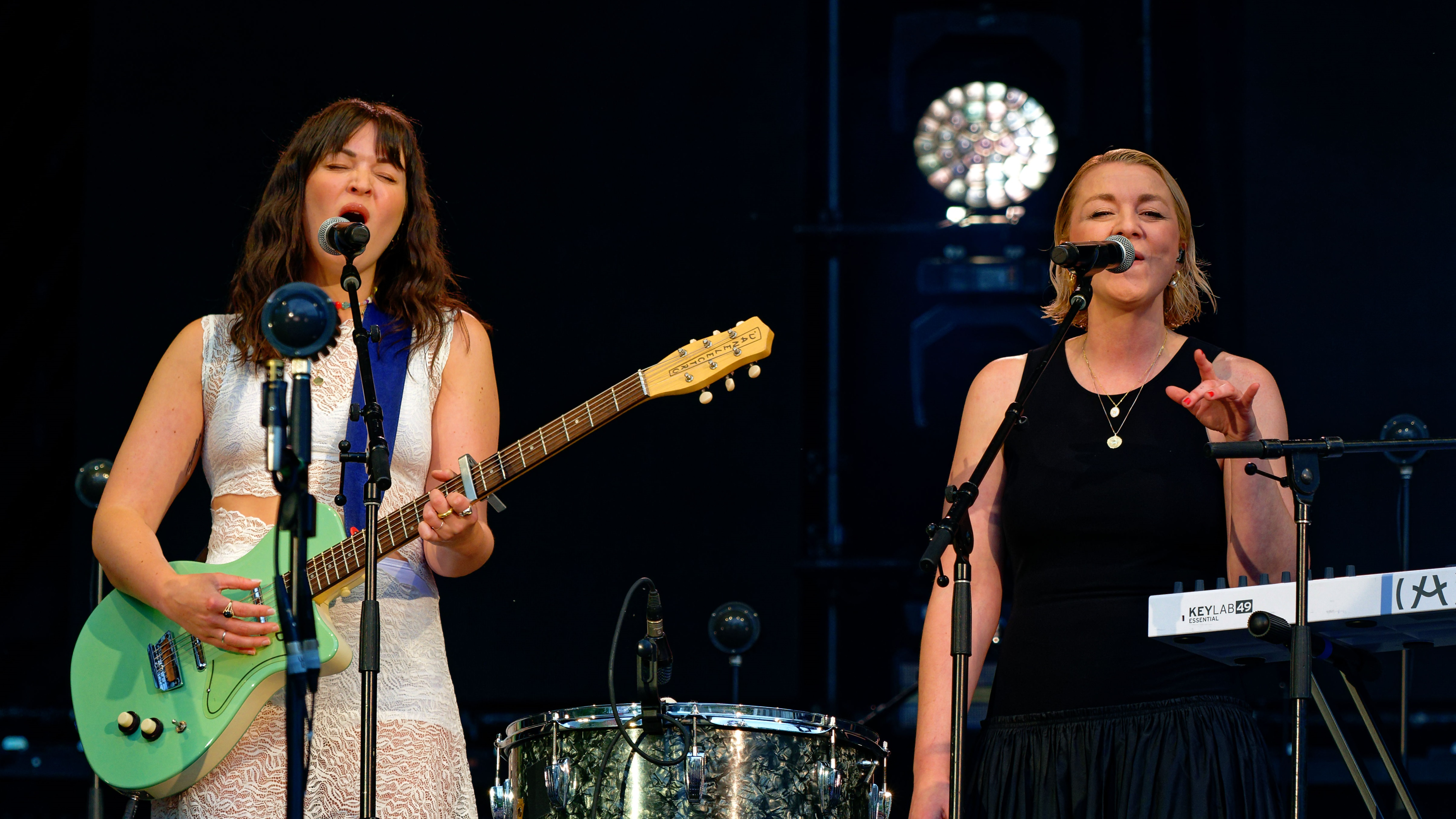
- At the FrancoFolies de Montréal in 2024.

Background information
- Origin: Gaspésie, Quebec, Canada
- Genres: folk music
- Years active: 2013–present
- Label: Grosse Boîte
- Members: Stéphanie Boulay; Mélanie Boulay
- Website: lessoeursboulay.com

Les Sœurs Boulay (The Boulay Sisters) are a Canadian folk music group from Quebec, consisting of sisters Stéphanie and Mélanie Boulay. Originally from the Gaspésie, they are currently based in Montreal.

== History ==
The Boulay sisters released their full-length debut album, Le poids des confettis, on Grosse Boîte in early 2013. Their song "Mappemonde" was a shortlisted nominee for the 2013 SOCAN Songwriting Prize, and the album was a longlisted nominee for the 2013 Polaris Music Prize. That year the pair were nominated for GAMIQ awards in seven categories.

The duo toured around Quebec in support of their album, singing and playing guitar and ukulele.

They released the follow-up 4488 de l'amour in October 2015. The title track received airplay on east coast radio stations. They continued touring, but in larger venues as their fan base grew.

In late 2017, the sisters took a break from touring because of Mélanie's pregnancy.

== Discography ==
Albums

- Les poids des confettis (2013)
- 4488 de l'amour (2015)
- La mort des étoiles (2019) – No. 23 Canada
