= 2021 in Canadian music =

The following musical events and releases that happened in 2021 in Canada.

== Events ==
- April 10 – 16th Canadian Folk Music Awards
- April 12 - CBC Music launches Canada Listens, a new musical version of the CBC's long-running literature debate show Canada Reads. Kardinal Offishall's album Quest for Fire: Firestarter, Vol. 1 is announced as the winner of the competition at the end of the week.
- June 6 – Juno Awards of 2021
- June 15 - Initial longlist for the 2021 Polaris Music Prize announced
- July 15 - Shortlist for the Polaris Music Prize announced
- July 26 - Prism Prize winners announced
- July 28 - SOCAN Songwriting Prize winners announced
- September 27 - Cadence Weapon wins the 2021 Polaris Music Prize for his album Parallel World
- November 7 - 43rd Félix Awards
- November 29 - 2021 Canadian Country Music Awards

== Albums released ==
=== 0-9 ===
- 347aidan, Chasing Harmony

=== A ===
- Afrikana Soul Sister, Kalasö
- AHI, Prospect
- Alaskan Tapes, For Us Alone
- Jeremie Albino and Cat Clyde, Blue Blue Blue
- Alee, Feels Like This - July 16
- All Hands Make Light, All Hands Make Light
- a l l i e, Tabula Rasa
- Arkells, Blink Once - September 30
- Tenille Arts, Girl to Girl - October 22

=== B ===
- Backxwash, I Lie Here Buried with My Rings and My Dresses - May 28
- BadBadNotGood, Talk Memory - October 8
- James Baley, A Story
- Ashleigh Ball, Before All the Magic's Gone
- Gord Bamford, Diamonds in a Whiskey Glass - June 4
- Barenaked Ladies, Detour de Force - July 16
- Quinton Barnes, As a Motherfucker
- The Beaches, Sisters Not Twins (The Professional Lovers Album)
- Beatchild, Unselfish Desires - August 13
- Bell Orchestre, House Music - March 19
- Belly, See You Next Wednesday - August 27
- Beppie, Dino-Mite!
- Art Bergmann, Late Stage Empire Dementia - May 21
- Bernice, Eau de Bonjourno
- The Besnard Lakes, The Besnard Lakes Are the Last of the Great Thunderstorm Warnings - January 29
- Justin Bieber, Justice - March 19
- Big Brave, Vital
- Big Brave with The Body, Leaving None but Small Birds
- Big Wreck, Big Wreck 7.1 - November 19
- Blue Rodeo, Many a Mile - December 3
- The Blue Stones, Hidden Gems - March 19
- Born Ruffians, Pulp - April 16
- Boslen, Dusk to Dawn
- Boy Golden, Church of Better Daze
- Boys Night Out, Nevermind 2 - July 16
- Jon Bryant, Psychidyllic Salutations - November 26
- T. Buckley, Frame by Frame
- Spencer Burton, Coyote

=== C ===
- Cadence Weapon, Parallel World - April 30
- Alessia Cara, In the Meantime - September 24
- Casey MQ, babycasey: ultra
- Charlotte Cardin, Phoenix - April 23
- Casper Skulls, Knows No Kindness - November 12
- Choses Sauvages, Choses Sauvages II
- Annabelle Chvostek, String of Pearls
- Cœur de pirate, Perséides (April 30); Impossible à aimer (October 15)
- Louis-Jean Cormier, Le ciel est au plancher - April 16
- Charlotte Cornfield, Highs in the Minuses - October 29
- Crown Lands, White Buffalo

=== D ===
- The Damn Truth, Now or Nowhere
- Death From Above 1979, Is 4 Lovers - March 26
- Art d'Ecco, In Standard Definition
- The Deep Dark Woods, Changing Faces
- Del Barber, Stray Dogs (Collected B-Sides / Vol. 1) - August 20
- Devours, Escape from Planet Devours
- The Dirty Nil, Fuck Art - January 1
- Julie Doiron, I Thought of You - November 26
- Drake, Certified Lover Boy - September 3
- Drake, Scary Hours 2 - March 5
- Kevin Drew, Influences - July 16
- Dru, The Rebirth MMXX - May 27
- Ducks Ltd., Modern Fiction
- Willie Dunn, Creation Never Sleeps, Creation Never Dies
- Marc Dupré, Où sera le monde
- Melanie Durrant, Where I'm At - May 7
- Dvsn, Amusing Her Feelings - January 15
- Dvsn and Ty Dolla Sign, Cheers to the Best Memories - August 20

=== E ===
- Jade Eagleson, Honkytonk Revival - November 12
- Efajemue, Aesthetics
- Emanuel, Alt Therapy
- Micah Erenberg, For the Ones Who Love Me Now; Frozen in Time
- André Ethier, Further Up Island

=== F ===
- Michael Feuerstack, Harmonize The Moon - March 19
- Dominique Fils-Aimé, Three Little Words - February 12
- Jeremy Fisher, Hello Blue Monday
- The Franklin Electric, This Time I See It - September 24

=== G ===
- The Garrys, Get Thee to a Nunnery
- Gayance, No Toning Down
- Godspeed You! Black Emperor, G_d's Pee AT STATE'S END! - April 2
- Great Aunt Ida, Unsayable - September 7
- Great Lake Swimmers, Live at the Redeemer 2007 - May 14
- Grievous Angels, Summer Before the Storm
- G. R. Gritt, Ancestors

=== H ===
- Half Moon Run, Inwards & Onwards
- Hillsburn, Slipping Away
- Home Front, Think of the Lie
- TheHonestGuy, Love Songs for No One
- Hunter Brothers, Been a Minute - June 30
- Nate Husser, Adult Supervision
- Andrew Hyatt, The Wanderspace Sessions (February); Wild Flowers (July)

=== I ===
- Brandon Isaak, Modern Primitive
- Islands, Islomania - June 11

=== J ===
- JayWood, Some Days
- Jazz Cartier, The Fleur Print - September 10
- Sean Jones, Weekend Lover - November 5

=== K ===
- Greg Keelor, Share the Love
- Mo Kenney, Covers - February 26
- Shawnee Kish, Shawnee Kish - June 25
- Brett Kissel, What Is Life? - April 9
- Kiwi Jr., Cooler Returns - January 22
- Korea Town Acid, Metamorphosis (April); Cosmos (October)
- Nicholas Krgovich, This Spring

=== L ===
- Land of Talk, Calming Night Partner - November 12
- Daniel Lanois, Heavy Sun - March 19
- Thierry Larose, Cantalou
- Sook-Yin Lee and Adam Litovitz, jooj two
- Hubert Lenoir, Pictura de Ipse: Musique directe - September 15
- Simon Leoza, Albatross
- Loony, Soft Thing; Turf
- Loscil, Clara - May 28
- Russell Louder, Humor
- Love Language, Trying to Reach You
- The Lowest of the Low, Taverns and Palaces - December 10

=== M ===
- Majid Jordan, Wildest Dreams - October 22
- Manila Grey, No Saints on Knight Street
- Martha and the Muffins, Marthology: In and Outtakes - November 5
- Matt Mays, From Burnside with Love
- Kyle McKearney, Down-Home
- Kairo McLean, Easy Now
- Kelly McMichael, Waves
- Myst Milano, Shapeshyfter
- Millimetrik, Sun-Drenched
- Ariane Moffatt, Incarnat - March 25
- Monowhales, Daytona Bleach
- Jess Moskaluke, The Demos - February 19
- Mother Mother, Inside - June 25
- Mouth Congress, Waiting for Henry - December 10
- Mustafa, When Smoke Rises - May 28

=== N ===
- N Nao and Joni Void, L’oiseau chante avec ses doigts
- Nimkii and the Niniis, Nang Giizhigoong
- Laura Niquay, Waska Matisiwin
- Safia Nolin, Seum
- Justin Nozuka, Then, Now & Again - April 9

=== O ===
- Ocie Elliott, Slow Tide
- Odonis Odonis, Spectrums
- Steven Lee Olsen, Relationship Goals - July 30
- The Oot n' Oots, Ponderosa Bunchgrass and the Golden Rule
- John Orpheus, Saga King
- Ouri, Frame of a Fauna

=== P ===
- Dorothea Paas, Anything Can't Happen - May 7
- Meghan Patrick, Heart on My Glass - June 25
- Nico Paulo, Live at First Light
- Dany Placard, Astronomie (suite)
- Planet Giza, Don't Throw Rocks at the Moon
- The Joel Plaskett Emergency, Twenty Years Gone: The Joel Plaskett Emergency Revisits Down at the Khyber
- Plaza, Nocturnes - October 1
- Pony, TV Baby
- Postdata, Twin Flames - March 5
- Garth Prince, Falling in Africa
- Priyanka, Taste Test - July 16

=== R ===
- Raised By Swans, Raised By Swans Is the Name of a Man, Volume 1 - February 9
- Rare Americans, Rare Americans 2 (March); Jamesy Boy & The Screw Loose Zoo (November)
- Rhye, Home - January 22
- Robert Robert, Silicone Villeray
- Daniel Romano, Cobra Poems
- Daniel Romano, Fully Plugged In
- Daniel Romano, Kissing the Foe
- Royal Canoe, Sidelining - July 9
- Justin Rutledge, Islands - March 26
- Ruth B., Moments In Between - June 11
- Serena Ryder, The Art of Falling Apart - March 12

=== S ===
- Julien Sagot, Sagot
- Said the Whale, Dandelion - October 22
- SATE, The Fool
- JP Saxe, Dangerous Levels Of Introspection - June 25
- Jay Scøtt, Ses plus grands succès
- Joseph Shabason, The Fellowship - April 30
- Shabason, Krgovich and Harris, Florence
- Shad, TAO - October 1
- Andy Shauf, Wilds
- Jairus Sharif, Mega Optics
- Tyler Shaw, Tyler Shaw - August 20
- Leanne Betasamosake Simpson, Theory of Ice
- Skiifall, Woiiyoie Tapes Vol. 1
- Small Sins, Volume II - February 12
- Snotty Nose Rez Kids, Life After
- Spiritbox, Eternal Blue - September 17
- Arielle Soucy, Unresolved Collection
- Souldia, Dixque d'art
- John Southworth, Rialto
- Status/Non-Status, 1 2 3 4 500 Years
- Emily Steinwall, Welcome to the Garden
- Jeffery Straker, Just Before Sunrise
- Stripper's Union, The Undertaking
- Adrian Sutherland, When the Magic Hits
- Suuns, The Witness

=== T ===
- Talk, Talk to Me
- Tebey, The Good Ones - January 22
- TEKE::TEKE, Shirushi
- TiKA, Anywhere But Here
- Tommy Lefroy, Flight Risk
- Morgan Toney, First Flight
- The Tragically Hip, Saskadelphia (EP) - May 21
- The Tragically Hip, Road Apples: 30th Anniversary Edition - October 15
- The Trews, Wanderer - November 19
- Tuns, Duly Noted - March 26

=== U ===
- Ubiquitous Synergy Seeker, Einsteins of Consciousness - January 8
- Suzie Ungerleider, My Name Is Suzie Ungerleider - August 13

=== V ===
- Mathew V, The Outer Circle
- Jake Vaadeland, No More Pain in My Heart; Retro Man
- Vincent Vallières, Toute beauté n'est pas perdue
- Chad VanGaalen, World's Most Stressed Out Gardener — March 19
- Jon Vinyl, Lost in You

=== W ===
- Martha Wainwright, Love Will Be Reborn - August 20
- The Weather Station, Ignorance - February 5
- Whitehorse, Modern Love
- Whitehorse, Strike Me Down
- The Wilderness of Manitoba, Farewell to Cathedral - October 29
- Charlotte Day Wilson, Alpha - July 9

=== Y ===
- Yoo Doo Right, Don’t Think You Can Escape Your Purpose

== Deaths ==
- January 12 - Curtis "Shingoose" Jonnie, singer-songwriter (COVID-19)
- January 28 - Jay W. McGee, R&B, soul and hip hop musician ("Ladies Delight", "Another Love in Your Life")
- April 4 - Paul Humphrey, lead singer for Blue Peter (multiple system atrophy)
- April 14 - Michel Louvain, singer (cancer)
- April 19 - Bob Lanois, record producer and recording engineer
- June 23 - Ellen McIlwaine, blues singer
- September 27 - Fernande Chiocchio, mezzo-soprano, pianist and teacher
- December 18 - Custom, filmmaker and musician (cardiac arrest)
