= Hildegard (album) =

Studio album by Hildegard
- Released: June 4, 2021
- Genre: Experimental pop
- Length: 28:19
- Language: English
- Label: section1

Hildegard is the debut studio album by Hildegard, a musical collaboration between Canadian pop musicians Helena Deland and Ouri. The album was preceded by the singles "Jour 2" and "Jour 1", the former of which was the first release on section1.

== Reception ==
Exclaim!'s Yara El-Soueidi rated Hildegard a 9 out of 10, writing that "Deland and Ouri come together as one, their identities fusing into an entity that embodies the best they both have to offer and then some". Ben Faulkner of The Line of Best Fit scored this album 8 out of 10, writing that this music has "shadowy intrigue" and comparing it to FKA Twigs. Writing for Pitchfork, Shaad D’Souza gave this release a 7.2 out of 10, comparing this work to Menneskekollektivet for feeling "like an opportunity for Deland and Ouri to consider the freedom that a musical union offers" and summing up that that collaboration "as a whole... feels like a remarkably realized whole, as opposed to some Frankenstein of styles and ideologies". Mark Moody of Under the Radar rated this album 7 out of 10, stating that "Deland and Ouri also take full command of their scenarios (or days in this case), ripe with complexities, vagaries, and retracements that ensure only they know their intended outcome, with the ability to take liberties as they see fit".

== Track listing ==
1. "Jour 1" – 4:54
2. "Jour 2" – 4:41
3. "Jour 3" – 3:06
4. "Jour 4" – 3:30
5. "Jour 5" – 3:59
6. "Jour 6" – 1:24
7. "Jour 7" – 2:52
8. "Jour 8" – 3:53

== Personnel ==
- Helena Deland – instrumentation, vocals
- Ouri – instrumentation, vocals
- Minji Kim – design, cover art
- Melissa Matos – art direction

== See also ==
- 2021 in Canadian music
- List of 2021 albums
