= Someone New (album) =

Studio album by Helena Deland
- Released: October 16, 2020
- Length: 47:51
- Language: English
- Label: Chivi Chivi, Luminelle Recordings
- Producer: Valentin Ignat

Helena Deland chronology
From the Series of Songs "Altogether Unaccompanied" (2018)	Someone New (2020)	Goodnight Summerland (2023)

“All the female characters in movies that I tended to identify with as a young girl were desirable women, and their position was often in relation to a man... It’s not from their subjectivity; they’re being described. [Writing this album], that wasn’t something that I wanted for myself—I wanted to find the main character.”

—Deland on themes in Someone New

Someone New is the first full-length studio album by Canadian art pop musician Helena Deland.

== Reception ==
Editors at AllMusic rated this album 3.5 out of 5 stars, with critic Marcy Donelson writing that "Deland's vulnerable voice helps make her self-conscious, searching commentaries all the more engrossing" on an album with "subtly shifting sounds and structures". Jess Wrigglesworth of Clash Music gave this album an 8 out of 10 for displaying Deland's "ability to combine woozy guitars with killer synths and endlessly catchy melodies". In Exclaim!, Joe Bagel rated this album 9 out of 10, calling it "a confetti cannon filled with breakup roses" that is "a gestational document, thrilling to witness" for Deland's exploration of romantic relationships. Editors of the publication chose it as the 39th best album of 2020, with Kaitlin Irving praising "evocative lyricism and melancholic guitar riffs [that] make the album so intoxicating, real and timeless, it may prove impossible to turn off". Someone New was an album of the week at The Line of Best Fit, where reviewer Jay Singh gave it a 9.5 out of 10 and called it "a living, breathing entity" that "has a presence that lingers long after it’s finished". In Loud and Quiet, Guia Cortassa rated Someone New 8 out of 10, stating that "Deland gets incredibly close to penning the perfect pop album for the current moment". Writing for Pitchfork, Sophie Kemp rated this album a 7.9 out of 10, stating that "despite its frequent darkness and sullen mood, Someone New shudders with a digital glow" that "replicates the push and pull of a complicated relationship". Steve Horowitz of PopMatters scored this release a 7 out of 10, noting the "ambitious and demanding" songwriting but also criticizing the lack of seriousness, continuing that a "lack of gravitas is also the album’s greatest flaw".

== Track listing ==
1. "Someone New" – 3:50
2. "Truth Nugget" – 4:41
3. "Dog" – 3:53
4. "Fruit Pit" – 3:16
5. "Pale" – 3:02
6. "Comfort, Edge" – 3:44
7. "The Walk Home" – 2:29
8. "Seven Hours" – 2:24
9. "Smoking at the Gas Station" – 4:34
10. "Lylz" – 3:03
11. "Mid Practice" – 3:58
12. "Clown Neutral" – 4:42
13. "Fill the Rooms" – 4:16

== Personnel ==
- Helena Deland – guitar, keyboards, vocals, cover art
- Tom Gould – bass guitar
- Valentin Ignat – bass guitar, guitar, keyboards, percussion, piano, backing vocals, engineering, production
- Alexandre Larin – guitar
- Francis Ledoux – drums
- Jesse Mac Cormack – bass guitar
- Cédric Martel – bass guitar
- Vishal Nayak – drums
- Ouri – cello on "The Walk Home", mixing on "Pale"
- Jacob Portrait – bass guitar, drums, keyboards, engineering on "Lylz", production on "Lylz"
- Gabe Wax – bass guitar, guitar, keyboards, percussion

== See also ==
- 2020 in Canadian music
- List of 2020 albums
