= Goodnight Summerland =

Studio album by Helena Deland
- Released: October 13, 2023
- Length: 38:34
- Language: English
- Label: Chivi Chivi; Luminelle
- Producer: Helena Deland (except "Swimmer"); Sam Evian (except "Swimmer"); Francis Ledoux ("Spring Bug"); Alexandre Larin ("Spring Bug"); Ouri ("Swimmer")

Helena Deland chronology
Someone New (2020)	Goodnight Summerland (2023)

"It was useful for me to put what grief was teaching me into music, even if just to have that process reflected back at me in a way that felt very intimate and personal."

—Deland on processing the grief of her mother's death on Goodnight Summerland.

Goodnight Summerland is a 2023 studio album by Canadian art pop musician Helena Deland. It has received positive reviews from critics.

== Reception ==
According to the review aggregator Metacritic, Goodnight Summerland received "universal acclaim" based on a weighted average score of 82 out of 100 from five critic scores. Editors at AllMusic rated this album 4 out of 5 stars, with critic Marcy Donelson writing that this music is "something rooted in folk and even more intimate" than Deland's first album, with songs that are "a poetic, sometimes philosophical set whose tone is always tender". Bill Pearis of BrooklynVegan declared this album of the week, with "words and music [that] make for a powerful, moving work". The publication also included it among the best music of October 2023. Writing for Exclaim!, Safiya Hopfe rated the album a 7 out of 10, writing that "Deland harnesses this superpower in the context of grief" while mourning her mother and characterizes the music as "frills-free lo-fi folk with only the most careful doses of synthetic obscurity". The Fader's David Renshaw wrote that "the heaviness of the subject matter stands in direct contrast to the light touch in the music, which sees Deland sidestep the ambient moods she has employed in the past in favor of full pastoral folk songs". Editors of Pitchfork included this work among 10 new albums for readers to listen to of the week, calling it an "album of exquisite, crystalline folk in a state of grief and inquiry" and critic Marissa Lorusso scored it a 7.4 out of 10 for lyrics that "grapple... with the realization that time will pass" and that explore how "even the intensity of our pain is dwarfed by the span of geologic time".

At The Quietus, editors shortlisted this as one of the best albums of the month and critic Robert Barry called it "a record of such gossamer fragility, such tenderness, that you will want to hold onto it gently, like a freshly laid egg". Writing for The Skinny, Katie Cutforth gave this album 5 out of 5 stars, calling it "a record of pure beauty and elegance, brimming with beguiling melodies and dazzling progressions". Editors at Stereogum chose this as Album of the Week, with critic Katherine Bassett writing that "Deland covers the full spectrum of grief—bargaining, regret, stilted conversations, unspoken words, the sharp pain of seeing calendar pages filled with plans that will now never materialize" and is "a wonderful songwriter" who has managed to make "an easy listen, a record that you can luxuriate in while letting it break your heart" with "warm, comforting and decadent" sonics. Mark Moody of Under the Radar rated the album 7.5 out of 10, stating that it "pivots from the experimental and cerebral work that preceded it to a heart forward rumination on loss and the cobbling together of memories" and "pulses with a low-key energy that speaks to the necessity of getting Deland's thoughts down on tape".

Jon Pareles of The New York Times chose "Saying Something" as one of the best songs of the week, calling it as "a soothing, folky song about a fraught moment".

Editors at Gorilla vs. Bear rated this the fifth-best album of 2023, calling it an "understated, quiet folk masterpiece" that is "stunning and heartbreaking", as well as "an intimate, achingly poignant, and hopeful rumination on loss and grief from my favorite songwriter". Editors at BrooklynVegan included this on their list of the 55 best albums of 2023 and this was also included in the 40 best independent albums of 2023 in the Indie Basement department and named one of the 10 great folk albums of the year.

The album was a longlisted nominee for the 2024 Polaris Music Prize.

== Track listing ==
All songs written by Helena Deland, except where noted.

1. "Moon Pith" (Deland and Alexandre Larin) – 1:37
2. "Saying Something" – 4:16
3. "Spring Bug" – 3:28
4. "Bright Green Vibrant Gray" – 3:40
5. "Drawbridge" – 3:28
6. "Roadflower" – 3:22
7. "The Animals" – 3:16
8. "Who I Sound Like" – 3:22
9. "Swimmer" – 3:33
10. "Night Soft as Silk" – 3:54
11. "Strawberry Moon" – 4:38

== Personnel ==
- Helena Deland – guitar, vocals, production (except on "Swimmer")
- Sam Evian – engineering (except on "Moon Pith" and "Swimmer"), mixing (except on "Swimmer"), production (except on "Swimmer")
- Valentin Ignat – engineering on "Moon Pith", "Spring Bug", "Roadflower", and "Strawberry Moon"
- Heba Kadry – mastering (except on "Swimmer")
- Francis Ledoux – engineering on "Spring Bug", production on "Moon Pith"
- Alexandre Larin – production on "Moon Pith"
- Radwan Ghazi Moumneh – engineering on "Swimmer"
- Ouri – mixing on "Swimmer", production on "Swimmer", mastering on "Swimmer"
- Beverly Zawitkoski – cover painting

== See also ==
- 2023 in Canadian music
- List of 2023 albums
