= Modern Fiction =

Modern Fiction may refer to:

- Modern Fiction (album), a 2021 album by Ducks Ltd.
- Modern Fiction (essay), an essay by Virginia Woolf

== See also ==
- Modern Fiction Studies, a peer-reviewed academic journal
