= Drawing Room =

Drawing Room may refer to:

- Drawing room, a room in a house for entertainment
- Drawing Room, a 2016 EP album by Helena Deland
