= Modern Fiction (album) =

Studio album by Ducks Ltd.
- Released: October 1, 2021
- Genre: Jangle pop
- Length: 29:46
- Language: English
- Label: Carpark

Ducks Ltd. chronology
Get Bleak (2019)	Modern Fiction (2021)	Harm's Way (2024)

Modern Fiction is the debut full-length album by Canadian indie rock duo Ducks Ltd. The album received positive reviews from critics.

== Reception ==
According to the review aggregator Metacritic, Modern Fiction received "universal acclaim" based on a weighted average score of 84 out of 100 from 5 critic scores.

Editors at AllMusic rated this album 4 out of 5 stars, with critic Fred Thomas writing that this album is a "mission statement" that builds on a jangle pop but the band "injects their own perspectives—both lyrical and compositional—into Modern Fiction, giving the songs personal angles and emotional color that place them very much in the now". Exclaim!'s Alex Hudson rated this release a 9 out of 10, stating that the album's songs range from "very good" to "sublime" and that the duo have worked their sound into "a flawless science". Ben Lynch of The Line of Best Fit rated this release a 7 out of 10, calling it "an invigorating and intensely rewarding release" that mixes happy and sad emotions, with "a consistent, latent sense of melancholy". At No Ripcord, Juan Edgardo Rodriguez scored Modern Fiction an 8 out of 10, comparing the music to Georgie Best and exhorting listeners to "let their addictive mechanical drum beats and effervescent melodies shake off those bittersweet thoughts". Mike Goldsmith scored this work 3 out of 5 stars for Record Collector, calling it "more than the sum of its parts" for combining several decades-old points of reference with complex lyrics. Editors at Spill Magazine chose this as a pick and critic Ljubinko Zivkovic rated it 9 out of 10, summing up that "McGreevy and Lewis seem to have both the songwriting, singing, and instrumental touch to make such a sound really work", resulting in "excellent stuff.

== Track listing ==
All songs written by Evan Lewis and Tom McGreevy.

1. "How Lonely Are You?" – 2:58
2. "Old Times" – 2:29
3. "18 Cigarettes" – 3:13
4. "Under the Rolling Moon" – 3:26
5. "Fit to Burst" – 2:44
6. "Patience Wearing Thin" – 1:37
7. "Always There" – 3:00
8. "Sullen Leering Hope" – 3:32
9. "'Twere Ever Thus" – 2:55
10. "Grand Final Day" – 3:47

== Personnel ==
Ducks Ltd.

- Evan Lewis – instrumentation, vocals, artwork
- Tom McGreevey – instrumentation, vocals

Additional personnel

- The Beths – backing vocals on "How Lonely Are You?", "Under the Rolling Moon", and "Always There"
- James Cecil – mixing at Super Melody World, Kerrie, Vic
- Paul Elrichman – string arrangement
- Aaron Goldstein – pedal steel on "Patience Wearing Thin"
- Esther Henderson – violins on "Fit to Burst", "Always There", "Sullen Leering Hope", "'Twere Ever Thus", and "Grand Final Day"
- Joe Lambert – mastering
- Eliza Niemi – cello on "18 Cigarettes"
- Natasha Prewitt – cello on "Fit to Burst", "Always There", "Sullen Leering Hope", "'Twere Ever Thus", and "Grand Final Day"
- Linnea Siggelkow – backing vocals on "Old Times", "'Twere Ever Thus", and "Grand Final Day"
- Carrie Webster – violin and viola on "Fit to Burst", "Always There", "Sullen Leering Hope", "'Twere Ever Thus", and "Grand Final Day"

== See also ==
- 2021 in Canadian music
- List of 2021 albums
