= Joyful Joyful =

Joyful Joyful are a Canadian musical duo, consisting of singer Cormac Culkeen and instrumentalist Dave Grenon. Their self-titled debut album was released in April 2022, and was longlisted for the 2022 Polaris Music Prize.

The duo's style blends experimental drone music with folk-influenced devotional music, inspired by Culkeen's background as a religious person who was excommunicated from an evangelical church community after coming out as queer and non-binary. Culkeen and Grenon, who knew each other as volunteers at community radio station CFFF-FM in Peterborough, Ontario, came together for the first time as Joyful Joyful in 2016 for a live performance in which they performed the 12-minute track "Sebaldus" improvisationally.
