= 2022 Polaris Music Prize =

Canadian music award

- Date: September 19, 2022
- Country: Canada
- Winner(s): Pierre Kwenders, José Louis and the Paradox of Love
- Website: polarismusicprize.ca

The 2022 edition of the Canadian Polaris Music Prize was presented on September 19, 2022. The longlist was announced on June 14, with the shortlist following on July 14.

== Shortlist ==
- Pierre Kwenders, José Louis and the Paradox of Love
- Destroyer, Labyrinthitis
- Lisa Leblanc, Chiac Disco
- Hubert Lenoir, PICTURA DE IPSE : Musique directe
- Kelly McMichael, Waves
- OMBIIGIZI, Sewn Back Together
- Ouri, Frame of a Fauna
- Shad, Tao
- Snotty Nose Rez Kids, Life After
- Charlotte Day Wilson, Alpha

== Longlist ==
- AHI, Prospect
- Arcade Fire, WE
- Backxwash, I Lie Here Buried with My Rings and My Dresses
- BADBADNOTGOOD, Talk Memory
- Jean-Michel Blais, Aubades
- Basia Bulat, The Garden
- Tanika Charles, Papillon de Nuit: The Night Butterfly
- Chiiild, Hope for Sale
- Destroyer, Labyrinthitis
- Julie Doiron, I Thought of You
- The Garrys, Get Thee to a Nunnery
- The Halluci Nation, One More Saturday Night
- Joyful Joyful, Joyful Joyful
- Adria Kain, When Flowers Bloom
- Lydia Képinski, Depuis
- Pierre Kwenders, José Louis and the Paradox of Love
- Ada Lea, one hand on the steering wheel the other sewing a garden
- Lisa Leblanc, Chiac Disco
- Hubert Lenoir, PICTURA DE IPSE : Musique directe
- Luna Li, Duality
- Les Louanges, Crash
- Loony, soft thing
- Kelly McMichael, Waves
- Men I Trust, Untourable Album
- Haviah Mighty, Stock Exchange
- Myst Milano, Shapeshyfter
- Cedric Noel, Hang Time
- OMBIIGIZI, Sewn Back Together
- Orville Peck, Bronco
- Ouri, Frame of a Fauna
- P'tit Belliveau, Un homme et son piano
- PUP, The Unraveling of PUPTheBand
- SATE, The Fool
- Shad, Tao
- Sister Ray, Communion
- Snotty Nose Rez Kids, Life After
- Stars, From Capelton Hill
- Tanya Tagaq, Tongues
- The Weeknd, Dawn FM
- Charlotte Day Wilson, Alpha

== Polaris Heritage Prize ==
Nominees for the Slaight Family Polaris Heritage Prize, an award to honour classic Canadian albums released before the creation of the Polaris Prize, were announced after the main Polaris Prize ceremony. The winners were announced on October 21.

- SNFU, ...And No One Else Wanted to Play - Public Vote
- Four the Moment, We're Still Standing - Jury Prize
- Lillian Allen, Revolutionary Tea Party
- Bran Van 3000, Glee
- Leonard Cohen, Various Positions
- Kardinal Offishall, Quest for Fire: Firestarter, Vol. 1
- k.d. lang, Ingenue
- Martha & the Muffins, This Is the Ice Age
- Wayne McGhie and the Sounds of Joy, Wayne McGhie and the Sounds of Joy
- Rascalz, Cash Crop
- Stars, Set Yourself on Fire
- The Weakerthans, Left and Leaving
