= Hillsburn (band) =

Canadian indie pop band

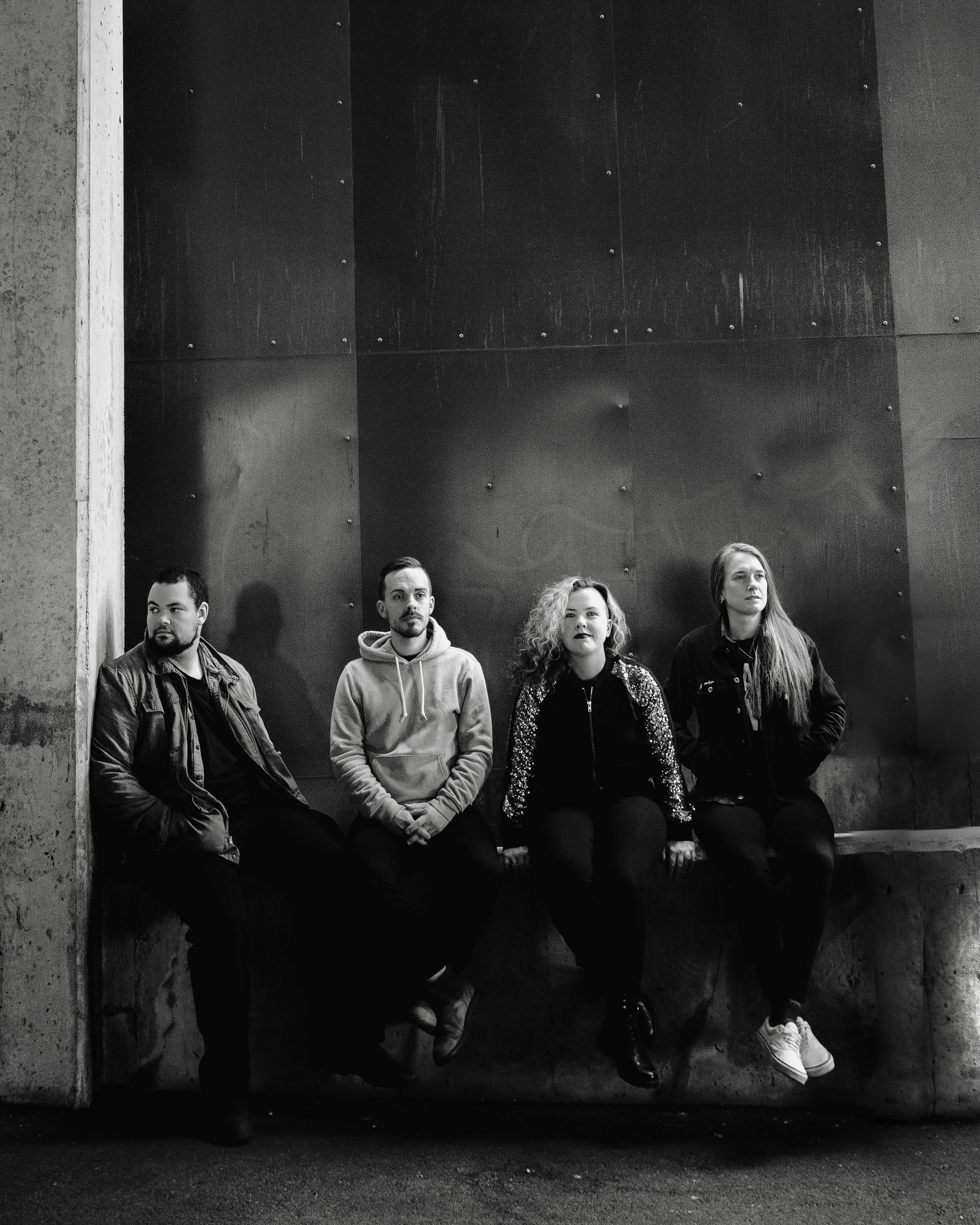

Background information
- Origin: Halifax, Nova Scotia, Canada
- Genres: Rock; indie; pop
- Years active: 2014–2024
- Labels: LHM Records
- Members: Rosanna Burrill; Clayton Burrill; Jackson Fairfax-Perry; Clare Macdonald
- Past members: Paul Aarntzen
- Website: hillsburn.com

Hillsburn was an indie pop band from Halifax, Nova Scotia, Canada. During their career they were hailed by several media outlets as one of the east coast of Canada's next big acts. Hillsburn released three full-length studio albums, and won a number of national and regional awards.

== Musical career ==
The band was formed as a quartet in 2014 at the home of band member Paul Aarntzen, who was residing in the small village of Hillsburn, Nova Scotia, at the time. Rosanna Burrill and her brother Clayton were joined by Jackson Fairfax-Perry at Paul's home where the band had its first rehearsals. Aarntzen subsequently relocated to Halifax to dedicate more time to the project. Hillsburn released its self-titled, self-recorded EP in October 2014. One of the tracks from this self-recorded EP was a finalist in CBC's Searchlight competition that year.

This early success was followed up with the release of the band's first full-length album, In The Battle Years in 2016. Shortly after releasing their debut full-length the band added drummer Clare Macdonald. Clare, Rosanna, and Jackson had all previously known each other from Dalhousie University's Music program.

In The Battle Years was awarded the 2016 Canadian Folk Music Award for New/Emerging Artist of the Year. Hillsburn was also nominated in several categories at the 2017 East Coast Music Awards, including Rising Star Recording of the Year, Group Recording of the Year, and Fans' Choice Video of the Year. The band won the 2017 ECMA for Fans' Choice Video.

Hillsburn toured extensively across North America.

Hillsburn released its sophomore record, The Wilder Beyond, on February 2, 2018. The album was nominated for six awards at the 2018 Nova Scotia Music Awards—including Group Recording of the Year, Recording of the Year, and Pop Recording of the Year—while Aarntzen was nominated for SOCAN songwriter of the year. Hillsburn also received four nominations for the 2019 East Coast Music Awards, including Group Recording of the Year and Fans' Choice Entertainer of the Year. The Wilder Beyond has charted extensively on the Earshot national campus and community radio charts in Canada. A deluxe edition of the album was released in February 2019.

The band announced in January 2020 that it was working on a new album with producer Howard Redekopp.

Paul Aarntzen left Hillsburn in 2020 after the band finished work on its third album, Slipping Away. Released on May 28, 2021, Slipping Away was produced by Howard Redekopp, who has worked with other notable Canadian acts including Tegan and Sara, The New Pornographers, and Mother Mother.

Hillsburn released a first single from Slipping Away, "Waking Up," in October 2020. "Husha" and "Get High" followed in February and March 2021.

The band and Slipping Away led the field of nominees at the 2022 East Coast Music Awards, with a total of six nominations, including for Album of the Year. Paul Aarntzen was nominated for both Songwriter and Song of the Year for his work on the album.

Hillsburn announced it was disbanding in early 2024. Backed by Symphony Nova Scotia, the band played its final show on April 26, 2024, in front of a sold-out crowd at the Rebecca Cohn Auditorium at Dalhousie University.

== Band members ==
- Rosanna Burrill – vocals, bass, guitar, violin
- Clayton Burrill – vocals, guitar, synthesizers
- Jackson Fairfax-Perry – keyboards, synthesizers
- Clare Macdonald – drums, percussion, vocals
- Paul Aarntzen (2014–2020) - songwriter, vocals, guitar, bass

== Discography ==
- Hillsburn EP – 2015
- In the Battle Years – 2016
- The Wilder Beyond – 2018
- The Wilder Beyond (Deluxe Edition) – 2019
- Slipping Away – 2021
- Stories – 2023

== Documentary ==
Hillsburn: A Band Becomes (2016)

== Awards and nominations ==
Year	Award	Category	Nominated	Result	Ref
2022	East Coast Music Awards	Album of the Year	Hillsburn / Slipping Away	Won	
2022	East Coast Music Awards	Songwriter of the Year	Paul Aarntzen	Nominated	
2022	East Coast Music Awards	Song of the Year	Paul Aarntzen / Hillsburn - "Get High"	Nominated	
2022	East Coast Music Awards	Group Recording of the Year	Hillsburn / Slipping Away	Won	
2022	East Coast Music Awards	Pop Recording of the Year	Hillsburn / Slipping Away	Won	
2019	East Coast Music Awards	Fans' Choice Entertainer of the Year	Hillsburn	Nominated	
2019	East Coast Music Awards	Group Recording of the Year	Hillsburn / The Wilder Beyond	Nominated	
2019	East Coast Music Awards	Fans' Choice Video of the Year	Hillsburn / Paul Aarntzen	Nominated	
2019	East Coast Music Awards	Video of the Year	Hillsburn / Paul Aarntzen	Nominated	
2018	Nova Scotia Music Awards	Entertainer of the Year	Hillsburn	Nominated	
2018	Nova Scotia Music Awards	Recording of the Year	Hillsburn	Nominated	
2018	Nova Scotia Music Awards	Group Recording of the Year	Hillsburn	Won	
2018	Nova Scotia Music Awards	Pop Recording of the Year	Hillsburn	Nominated	
2018	Nova Scotia Music Awards	SOCAN Songwriter of the Year	Paul Aarntzen "Time of Life"	Nominated	
2018	Nova Scotia Music Awards	Digital Artist of the Year	Hillsburn	Nominated	
2017	East Coast Music Awards	Fan's Choice Video of the Year	Hillsburn "Run Down"	Won	
2017	East Coast Music Awards	Group Recording of the Year	Hillsburn	Nominated	
2017	East Coast Music Awards	Rising Star Recording of the Year	Hillsburn	Nominated	
2016	Canadian Folk Music Awards	New/Emerging Artists of the Year	Hillsburn	Won	
2016	Canadian Folk Music Awards	Vocal Group of the Year	Hillsburn	Nominated	
2016	Atlantic Film Festival	Best Atlantic Original Score	Hillsburn: A Band Becomes	Won	
2016	Nova Scotia Music Awards	Group Recording of the Year	Hillsburn	Nominated	
2016	Nova Scotia Music Awards	Music Video of the Year	Hillsburn "Run Down"	Nominated	
2016	Nova Scotia Music Awards	Americana/Bluegrass Recording of the Year	Hillsburn	Nominated	
2016	Nova Scotia Music Awards	Digital Artist of the Year	Hillsburn	Nominated	
2015	Nova Scotia Music Awards	Group Recording of the Year	Hillsburn	Nominated	
2015	Nova Scotia Music Awards	New Artist Recording of the Year	Hillsburn	Nominated	
2015	Nova Scotia Music Awards	Americana/Bluegrass Recording of the Year	Hillsburn	Nominated	
