= Nyssa (musician) =

Canadian singer-songwriter

NYSSA is a Canadian singer-songwriter from Toronto, Ontario, whose debut album Girls Like Me was released in 2020.

Her second album, Shake Me Where I'm Foolish, followed in 2024.

She has been a two-time longlisted Polaris Music Prize nominee, receiving nods at the 2021 Polaris Music Prize for Girls Like Me and at the 2024 Polaris Music Prize for Shake Me Where I'm Foolish.
