= Sargeant X Comrade =

Sargeant X Comrade is a Canadian soul music duo from Calgary, Alberta, whose full-length debut album Magic Radio was a longlisted nominee for the 2021 Polaris Music Prize.

The band was formed in the early 2010s by vocalist Yolanda Sargeant and producer Evgeniy "Comrade" Bykovets. They released the EP Salvage the Soul in 2014, and followed up with a number of singles before releasing Magic Radio in 2020. The album's single "Romance in Outer Space" features a rap cameo by Kool Keith.

In addition to their Polaris nomination, they received two Western Canadian Music Award nominations in 2021, for Breakout Artist of the Year and Rap & Hip-Hop Artist of the Year.

Sargeant also performed vocals on "Hold Me Up", a 2020 single by producer Hello Moth.
