= OMBIIGIZI =

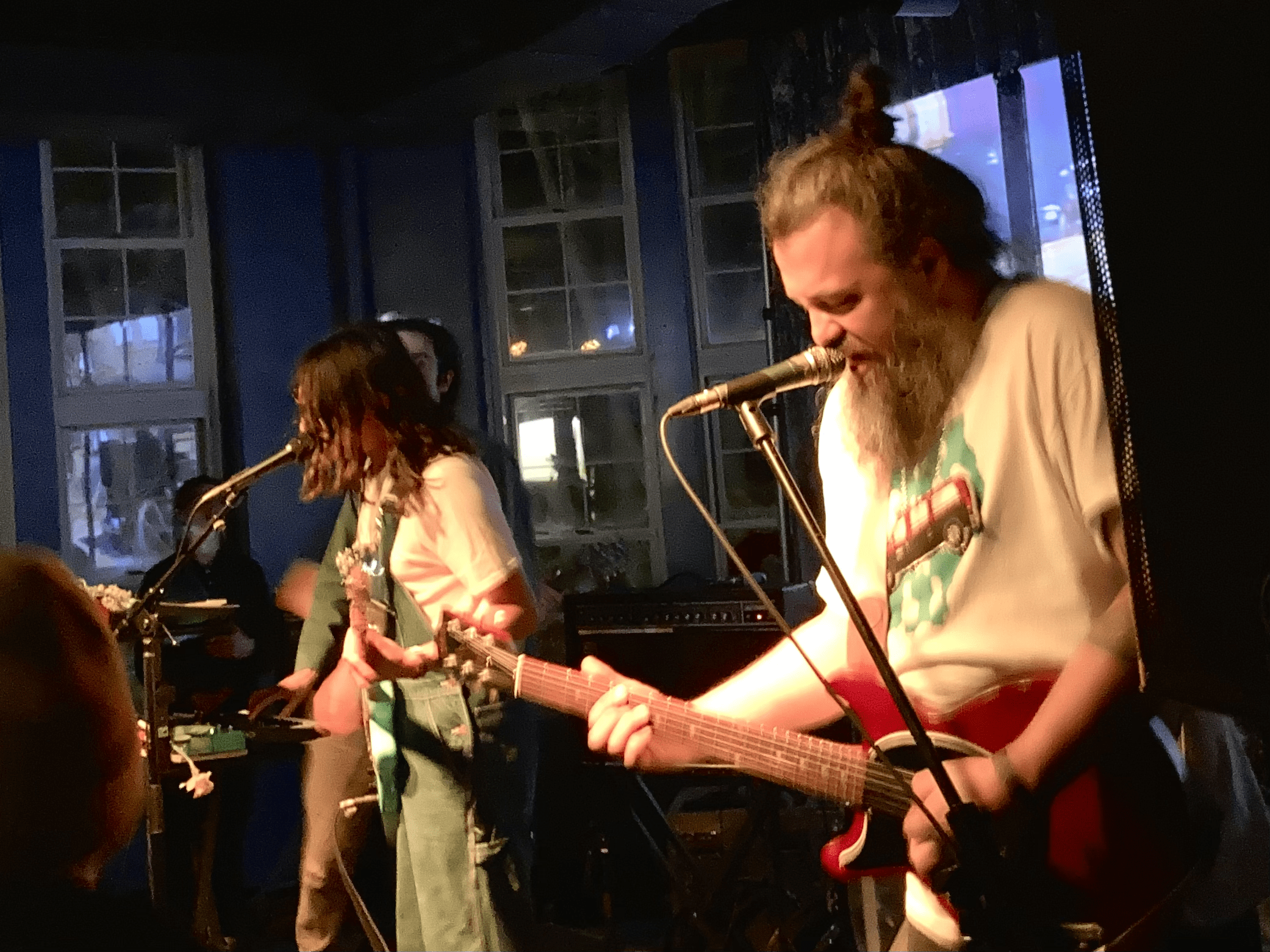
- OMBIIGIZI in London, Ontario performing at Winter Spectacular 2023

Background information
- Genre: Alternative Rock
- Years active: 2022–present

OMBIIGIZI is a Canadian musical project, consisting of Adam Sturgeon of Status/Non-Status and Daniel Monkman of Zoon. Their debut album Sewn Back Together was released in 2022, and was shortlisted for the 2022 Polaris Music Prize.

Sturgeon and Monkman first met in 2018, bonding over their commonalities as indigenous musicians who were interested in experimental and alternative rock music, and discussed the possibility of collaborating. Shortly thereafter, Sturgeon met Kevin Drew of Broken Social Scene at a fundraising benefit for the Gord Downie and Chanie Wenjack Fund; when the duo decided to proceed with the planned collaboration in 2021, Drew arranged a series of recording sessions at the Bathouse Recording Studio, and served as the album's producer.

The album's first preview single, "Residential Military", was released in November 2021, and was followed by "Cherry Coke" in January 2022, before the full album was released in February on Arts & Crafts Productions.

In 2024 they released their second album, Shame.
