= Klô Pelgag =

Canadian singer-songwriter (born 1990)

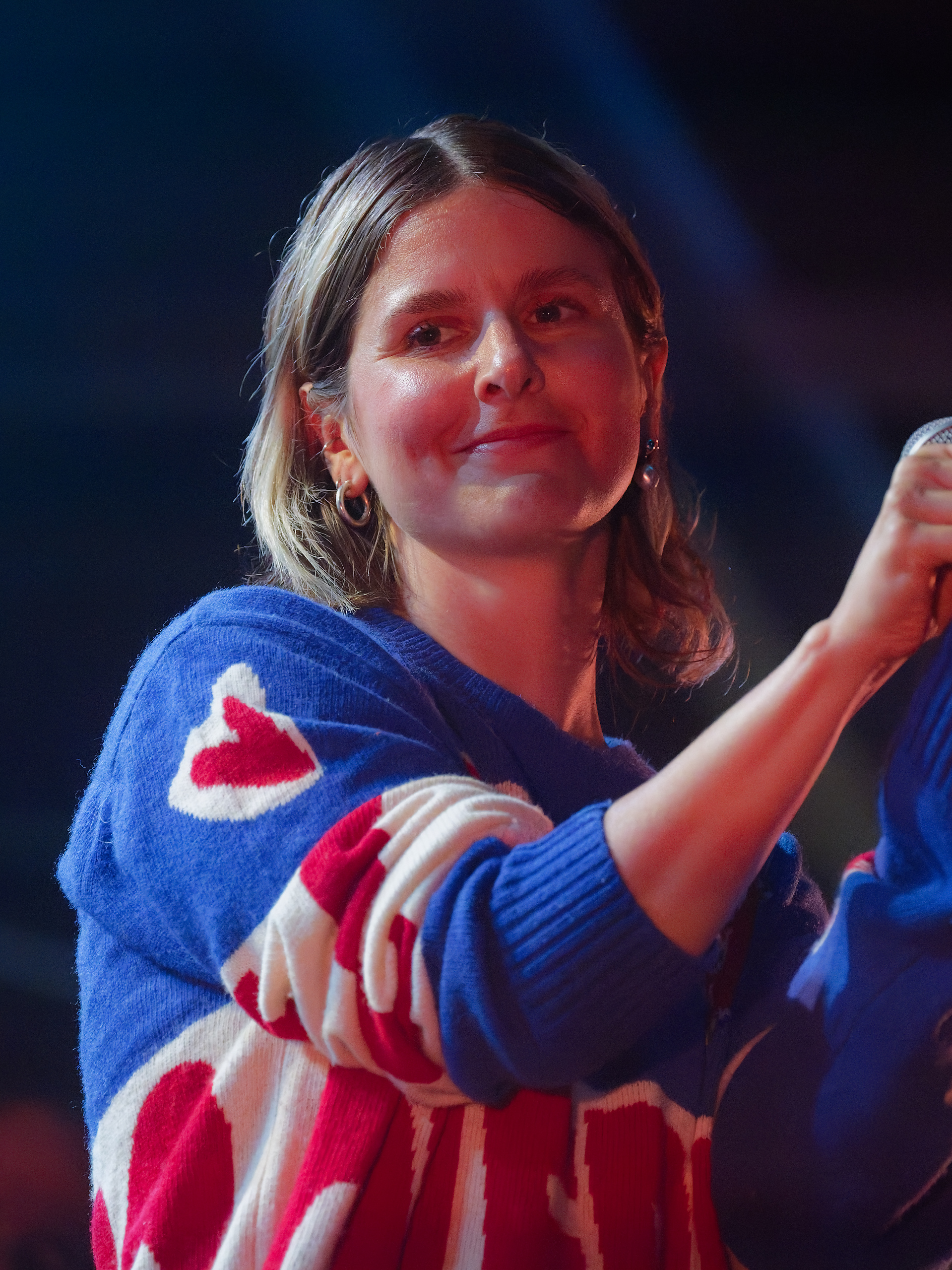
- Klô Pelgag performing in Petite-Vallée, June 2026

Background information
- Born: Chloé Pelletier-Gagnon; March 13, 1990 (age 36); Sainte-Anne-des-Monts, Quebec
- Genres: Pop, baroque pop
- Occupation: Singer-songwriter
- Years active: 2009–present

Klô Pelgag is the stage name of Chloé Pelletier-Gagnon (born March 13, 1990, in Sainte-Anne-des-Monts, Quebec), a Canadian singer-songwriter from Quebec.

Beginning her career in 2009 as a performer at various festivals and music contests in Quebec, she released her self-titled debut EP in 2012. Her full-length album L'Alchimie des monstres followed in 2013.

She won the Félix Award for New Artist of the Year in 2014. She was a shortlisted nominee for the SOCAN Songwriting Prize in 2014 for her song "La fièvre des fleurs", and L'Alchimie des monstres was a nominee for Francophone Album of the Year at the Juno Awards of 2015. In December 2014, she won the SOCAN Breakout Award at the Francophone SOCAN Awards in Montreal.

She released a new album in November 2016, L'étoile thoracique.

At the Gala de l'ADISQ in 2018, she won the Prix Félix for Female Singer of the Year. Her 2020 album Notre-Dame-des-Sept-Douleurs was shortlisted for the 2021 Polaris Music Prize.

Her 2024 album Abracadabra was longlisted for the 2025 Polaris Music Prize.

Her brother, Mathieu David Gagnon, is a composer and arranger most noted for the instrumental music project Flore Laurentienne, although he has also composed orchestral arrangements for Pelgag's albums.

== Discography ==
- Klô Pelgag (EP; 2012)
- L'Alchimie des monstres (album; 2013)
- L'Étoile thoracique (album; 2016)
- Notre-Dame-des-Sept-Douleurs (album; 2020)
- Abracadabra (album; 2024)
