= Bleached Wavves =

Studio album by Zoon
- Released: June 19, 2020
- Genres: Shoegaze; moccasin-gaze
- Length: 29:13
- Label: Paper Bag

Zoon chronology
Bleached Wavves (EP, as Bloom) (2019)	Bleached Wavves (2020)	Big Pharma (EP) (2022)

Bleached Wavves is the debut studio album by Ojibwe shoegaze musician Daniel Monkman, known by the stage name Zoon. The album was released on June 19, 2020, via Paper Bag Records. Monkman was raised in the Brokenhead Ojibway Nation and faced many struggles growing up, such as poverty and addiction. They discovered shoegaze music as a teenager, and started a band after moving to Hamilton, Ontario. The album has been described as shoegaze and "moccasin-gaze". It has received positive reviews from AllMusic, Exclaim!, and No Ripcord. It was also shortlisted for the 2021 Polaris Music Prize.

== Background and recording ==
Daniel Monkman is an indigenous Canadian who was raised in the Brokenhead Ojibway Nation, near Winnipeg, Manitoba. Monkman discovered shoegaze music as a teenager. They faced many struggles while growing up, including poverty and addiction, leading them to seek spirituality. They moved to Hamilton, Ontario, where they started the band Bloom, later renamed to Zoon after the Ojibwe word Zoongide'ewin. Under Bloom, Monkman released the EP Bleached Wavves via cassette-only, containing early versions of some songs that were on the album.

Monkman had their equipment stolen prior to finishing the album. They recorded Bleached Wavves mostly alone, using a guitar and one effects pedal. The album was released on June 19, 2020, via Paper Bag Records.

== Music ==
Bleached Wavves is a shoegaze album that has drawn comparisons to My Bloody Valentine. The album has also been described as "moccasin-gaze", which is a blend of shoegaze with North American Indigenous music.

"Vibrant Colours" takes inspiration from Madchester. "Was & Always Will Be" expands on shoegaze's sound and was described as "less a song than a mantra" by Paul Simpson of AllMusic. Guitars reminiscent of Slowdive feature on "Light Prism". "Infinite Horizons" features a spoken word monologue about Monkman's ancestry and history. The instrumental "Landscapes" uses guitars and "hard rhythmic panning". The closer track "Help Me Understand" combines guitars and traditional drums to create a sound that "seems to transcend shoegaze", according to Josiah Nelson of Exclaim!

== Critical reception ==
Professional ratings
Review scores
Source	Rating
AllMusic	3.5/5 stars
No Ripcord	8 / 10
Exclaim!	9 / 10

Paul Simpson of AllMusic gave the album three-and-a-half out of five stars, writing "it'll be fascinating to see where [Monkman] goes from here". Juan Edgardo Rodríguez of No Ripcord gave the album 8 out of 10 points, and described it as a "sonic meditation" filled with symbolism. Josiah Nelson of Exclaim! gave the album 9 out of 10 points, praising it for its "rich" emotion and ability to take influence without being derivative.

Bleached Wavves was shortlisted for the 2021 Polaris Music Prize, which awards the best Canadian album of the year, regardless of genre.

== Track listing ==
1. "Clouded Formation" – 1:05
2. "Vibrant Colours" – 4:36
3. "Was & Always Will Be" – 3:10
4. "Bleached Wavves" – 3:27
5. "BrokenHead" – 2:48
6. "A Perfect Sunset Ahead" – 0:44
7. "Light Prism" – 3:54
8. "Infinite Horizons" – 2:05
9. "Landscapes" – 2:56
10. "Help Me Understand" – 4:28

Total length – 29:13
