= We (Arcade Fire album) =

- Standard cover

Studio album by Arcade Fire
- Released: May 6, 2022
- Recorded: 2020–2021
- Studios: RAK Studios (London); Wack Formula (London); The Crow's Nest Studios (London); Boombox Studios (New Orleans, LA); Marigny Recording Studio (New Orleans, LA); Dockside Studio (Maurice, LA); Sonic Ranch Studios (Tornilo, TX)
- Genres: Indie rock; folk rock; dance-pop
- Length: 40:18
- Label: Columbia
- Producers: Nigel Godrich; Win Butler; Régine Chassagne

Arcade Fire chronology
Her (Original Score) (2021)	We (2022)	Pink Elephant (2025)

Singles from WE
- 1. "The Lightning I, II" Released: March 17, 2022; 2. "Unconditional I (Lookout Kid)" Released: April 27, 2022

We is the sixth studio album by Canadian indie rock band Arcade Fire, released through Columbia Records on May 6, 2022. Produced by Nigel Godrich and band members Win Butler and Régine Chassagne, it was recorded in studios in New Orleans; in El Paso, Texas; and on Mount Desert Island in Maine. The album takes its name from the 1924 Russian dystopian novel We by Yevgeny Zamyatin.

Preceded by the singles "The Lightning I, II" and "Unconditional I (Lookout Kid)", We received generally positive reviews from music critics and achieved moderate commercial success. It debuted at number six on the US Billboard 200 chart, earning 32,000 album-equivalent units (26,500 of which were sales of the full album) in its first week of release, and went to number one in the United Kingdom, Ireland, the Netherlands, and Portugal. The album was nominated for Best Alternative Music Album at the 65th Annual Grammy Awards.

== Background ==
In April 2020, Win Butler posted a letter to his Instagram account indicating that work on a new Arcade Fire album had commenced prior to the COVID-19 pandemic, and that the writing continued during the lockdown measures. He noted that he had written a song entitled "Age of Anxiety" before the pandemic, and that many of the themes he had begun to explore felt appropriate, given the circumstances surrounding the pandemic. Later that month, Butler shared some snippets of the new material.

On October 21, 2020, Butler commented about Arcade Fire's sixth album during an interview for the Broken Record podcast. The band had been writing for a year before the COVID-19 lockdown, and, during the lockdown, Butler kept working and wrote "two or three" new albums. Arcade Fire planned to record the album in Texas "during the election".

According to the producer, Nigel Godrich, We was recorded "in the middle of nowhere" outside El Paso, Texas, during the COVID-19 lockdown. He said: "[We] basically lived in a cult for a couple of months. Nobody came in and nobody came out, people delivered the shopping, that sort of vibe just so we could be able to do it. It was a method to make it possible."

== Composition ==
Musically, We shifts "smoothly and deliberately" between "gentle" folk rock and "grooving" dance-pop.

The track “Unconditional II (Race and Religion)” features backing vocals by Peter Gabriel.

== Promotion and release ==
On April 14, 2021, Arcade Fire released a 45-minute instrumental piece entitled "Memories of the Age of Anxiety" on the meditation app Headspace.

In March 2022, fans received postcards marked with the band's logo. The postcards included the note "WE missed you" above musical notations on the front, and an image of an eye with the word "Unsubscribe" written below it on the back. Those same images began to appear in signage around London and on the band's social media pages, indicating the album's impending release.

On March 14, the band announced that a new song titled "The Lightning I, II" would be released on March 17. In concert with the release of the single, it was announced that the album would be titled We and released on May 6, 2022, and that it was produced by Nigel Godrich, Win Butler, and Régine Chassagne, and recorded in studios in New Orleans; in El Paso, Texas; and on Mount Desert Island in Maine. The cover artwork featuring a photograph by French artist JR with airbrush color tinting by Terry Pastor was also revealed. Later in March, Will Butler announced he had amicably left the band after the new album was completed in late 2021.

The day after the release of the album, the band appeared on Saturday Night Live. They played "Unconditional I (Lookout Kid)" and "The Lightning I, II", as well as "End of The Empire II" over the closing credits.

The album was released in Dolby Atmos.

== Critical reception ==
Professional ratings
Aggregate scores
Source	Rating
AnyDecentMusic?	7.2/10
Metacritic	73/100
Review scores
Source	Rating
AllMusic	3.5/5 stars
The Daily Telegraph	5/5 stars
Exclaim!	7/10
The Guardian	3/5 stars
The Independent	5/5 stars
The Line of Best Fit	9/10
NME	4/5 stars
Paste	8.3/10
Pitchfork	7.0/10
Slant Magazine	3.5/5 stars

We was met with generally positive reviews from music critics. On Metacritic, it has a weighted average score of 73 out of 100 based on 29 reviews, indicating "generally favorable reviews". It was longlisted for the 2022 Polaris Music Prize and nominated for Best Alternative Music Album at the 65th Annual Grammy Awards.

Critics regarded We as a shift to a more precise and familiar effort by the band, musically and conceptually, particularly in comparison to the preceding studio album Everything Now. Jeremy Winograd of Slate Magazine described the album as "tenacious" and a return to Arcade Fire's "classic sound", considering the melodies and arrangement "as excellent as they are predictable". Neil Z. Yeung of AllMusic wrote that the singles such as "Unconditional I" and both parts of "The Lightning" would please fans of Arcade Fire's early albums, comparing the production style "to a pure and nostalgic time when they were just a young band from Montreal."

We enjoyed praise by some critics. Neil McCormick of The Daily Telegraph gave the album 5/5, labeling it an "ambitious and boldly realised" work that is "every bit as good as their best", and praised the album's concept and "lush sound". Helen Brown of The Independent also awarded the album 5/5, writing "We is a big old blast of an album. One destined to lift the spirit, inflate the soul and get fans dancing giddily through the carnage of 2022". In contrast, Alexis Petridis of The Guardian gave a mixed review, describing the album as "some of Arcade Fire’s most straightforward music to date" and the lyrics as "peevish" and "irritating", but complimenting the change of approach to Everything Now as an improvement that "returns to well-trodden territory".

== Commercial performance ==
In the United States, the album debuted at number six on the Billboard 200, marking Arcade Fire's fifth top-ten debut on the chart. During its first week of release in the US, it earned 32,000 album-equivalent units, of which 26,500 came from sales of the full album, 5,000 came from 6.43 million on-demand official streams of songs from the album, and 500 came from 5,000 paid downloads of individual tracks from the album.

== Track listing ==
All tracks written by Win Butler and Régine Chassagne; additional writing on "Unconditional II (Race and Religion)" by Will Butler.

Digital track listing

No.	Title	Length
1.	"Age of Anxiety I"	5:27
2.	"Age of Anxiety II (Rabbit Hole)"	6:41
3.	"Prelude"	0:30
4.	"End of the Empire I–III"	5:23
5.	"End of the Empire IV (Sagittarius A*)"	3:54
6.	"The Lightning I"	3:01
7.	"The Lightning II"	2:34
8.	"Unconditional I (Lookout Kid)"	4:33
9.	"Unconditional II (Race and Religion)" (featuring Peter Gabriel)	4:20
10.	"WE"	3:51
Total length:		40:18

CD/vinyl track listing

"I"
No.	Title	Length
1.	"Age of Anxiety I"	5:27
2.	"Age of Anxiety II (Rabbit Hole)" (ends with "Prelude")	7:05
3.	"End of the Empire I–IV: I. Last Dance; II. Last Round; III. Leave the Light On; IV. Sagittarius A*"	9:17

"WE"
No.	Title	Length
4.	"The Lightning I, II"	5:36
5.	"Unconditional I (Lookout Kid)"	4:33
6.	"Unconditional II (Race and Religion)" (featuring Peter Gabriel)	4:20
7.	"WE"	3:51
Total length:		40:09

== Personnel ==
Adapted from the full album credits, with track numbers corresponding to the digital release.

=== Arcade Fire ===
- Régine Chassagne – keyboards, piano, accordion, backing and lead vocals, orchestral arrangements, production
- Win Butler – lead and backing vocals, guitars, bass, keyboards, piano, percussion, production
- Richard Reed Parry – electric guitar, bass guitar, backing vocals
- Tim Kingsbury – acoustic guitar, electric guitar, bass guitar, backing vocals
- Jeremy Gara – drums, percussion
- Will Butler – keyboards, bass guitar, backing vocals

=== Additional musicians ===
- Josh Tillman – "stomps and breaths" (track 1)
- Geoff Barrow – granular synthesis (track 2)
- Paul Beaubrun – sound effects (track 3, 4, 5)
- Owen Pallett – orchestral arrangements, strings (tracks 4, 5, 6, 7, 8)
- Sally Herbert – conductor, additional arrangements (tracks 2, 4, 5, 10)
- Helen Gillet – strings (tracks 4, 5, 8)
- Harry Hardin – strings (tracks 4, 5, 8)
- Matt Rhody – strings (tracks 4, 5, 8)
- Andre Michot – accordion (tracks 4, 5, 6, 7, 8)
- Liza Rey – harp (tracks 4, 5, 10)
- Charlie Gabriel – saxophone (tracks 4, 5)
- Mark Braud – trumpet (tracks 4, 5)
- Wendell Brunious – trumpet (tracks 4, 5)
- Sarah Neufeld – strings (tracks 6, 7)
- Louis Michot – fiddle (tracks 6, 7, 8)
- Orlando Primo – congas, djembe (tracks 8, 9)
- Peter Gabriel – additional vocals (track 9)
- Willonson Duprate – congas (track 9)
- Romeo Bougere – agogô bell (track 9)
- Michael Brun – additional synthesis (track 9)
- Everton Nelson – additional strings
- Natalia Bonner – additional strings
- Ian Burdge – additional strings
- Louisa Fuller – additional strings
- Richard George – additional strings
- Marianne Haynes – additional strings
- Oli Langford – additional strings
- John Metcalfe – additional strings
- Tom Piggott Smith – additional strings
- Rachel Robson – additional strings
- Lucy Wilkins – additional strings
- Chris Worsey – additional strings
- Edwin Farnham Butler IV – whispers ("End of the Empire")

=== Production ===
- Nigel Godrich – production, mixing
- Eric Heigle – co-production (tracks 1, 2, 8, 9), recording
- Josh Tillman – additional production (tracks 1, 2)
- Geoff Barrow – additional production (track 2)
- Mikko Gordon – additional production (track 5), recording, mixing assistance
- Steve Mackey – pre-production
- Emily Eck – recording
- Suvi-Eeva Äikäs – additional recording (track 2)
- Julia Simpson – additional recording (track 2)
- Owen Pallett – additional recording (tracks 6, 7)
- James Seymour – additional recording (track 6, 7)
- Mark Lawson – additional recording (track 9)
- Jerry Ordonez – recording assistance
- Marco Ramirez – recording assistance
- Justin Tocket – recording assistance
- Matt Aguiluz – recording assistance
- Nathanael Graham – recording assistance
- Francesca Edwards – recording assistance
- Joy Stacey – recording assistance
- Pablo Godin – recording assistance
- Felipe Gutierrez – recording assistance
- Craig Silvey – mixing
- Dani Bennett Spragg – mixing assistance
- Greg Calbi – mastering
- Steve Fallone – mastering
- Ryan Smith – vinyl mastering

=== Artwork ===
- JR – cover image, WE poster image, additional eye photography
- Terry Pastor – airbrush color tinting
- Ping Pong Ping – album graphic design
- Julia Simpson – album creative production
- Alison Green – center image and Polaroids
- IV – "I Guy" Character, handwriting
- Camille Pajot – studio art direction
- Marc Azoulay – art production
- Rick Rose – digitech
- Fabien Barrau – cover image photo post-production
- Chroma Center – photo printing, post-production
- EHT Collaboration – "Black Hole" image
- Danny Clinch – David Bowie photograph
- Pneuhaus – "Giant Eye"
- Maria Jose Govea – additional photography
- JF Lalonde – additional photography
- Wes Winship – "Acropolis Is Burning" poster
- Don Hertzfeldt – still from World of Tomorrow: Episode 2
- Gift Horst Tintypes – WE poster photo development

== Charts ==
=== Weekly charts ===
Weekly chart performance for We
Chart (2022)	Peak position
Australian Albums (ARIA)	11
Austrian Albums (Ö3 Austria)	2
Belgian Albums (Ultratop Flanders)	4
Belgian Albums (Ultratop Wallonia)	4
Canadian Albums (Billboard)	3
Danish Albums (Hitlisten)	19
Dutch Albums (Album Top 100)	1
Finnish Albums (Suomen virallinen lista)	22
French Albums (SNEP)	2
German Albums (Offizielle Top 100)	5
Irish Albums (IRMA)	1
Italian Albums (FIMI)	19
New Zealand Albums (RMNZ)	20
Norwegian Albums (VG-lista)	15
Polish Albums (ZPAV)	31
Portuguese Albums (AFP)	1
Scottish Albums (Official Charts)	1
Spanish Albums (Promusicae)	6
Swedish Albums (Sverigetopplistan)	42
Swiss Albums (Schweizer Hitparade)	2
UK Albums (Official Charts)	1
US Billboard 200	6
US Top Alternative Albums (Billboard)	1
US Top Rock Albums (Billboard)	1

=== Year-end charts ===
Year-end chart performance for We
Chart (2022)	Position
Belgian Albums (Ultratop Flanders)	69
Belgian Albums (Ultratop Wallonia)	166
Portuguese Albums (AFP)	29

== Certifications ==
Certifiications for We
Region	Certification	Certified units/sales
United Kingdom (BPI)	Silver	60,000^{‡}
^{‡} Sales+streaming figures based on certification alone.
