= Eliza Niemi =

Canadian indie pop musician

Eliza Niemi is a Canadian indie pop singer-songwriter and cellist, whose two solo albums, Staying Mellow Blows (2023) and Progress Bakery (2025), have been longlisted for the Polaris Music Prize.

Currently based in Toronto, Ontario, she was previously a member of the Halifax-based indie rock band Mauno, which released three albums between 2016 and 2019.

She released the solo EPs Vinegar (2019) and Glass (2020), before releasing Staying Mellow Blows in August 2022. She supported the album with concerts in North America and Europe in 2023.

She was a SOCAN Songwriting Prize nominee in 2023 as co-writer with Felix Fox-Pappas, Chester Hansen, Alexander Sowinski, Leland Whitty and Jonah Yano of Yano's single "always". She has also contributed as a guest cellist on recordings by Gift Idea and Ducks Ltd., and composed music for the 2024 film Darkest Miriam.

== Discography ==
=== with Mauno ===
- Rough Master (2015)
- Tuning (2017)
- Really Well (2019)

=== Solo ===
- Vinegar (2019)
- Glass (2020)
- Staying Mellow Blows (2022)
- Progress Bakery (2025)
