= From the Series of Songs "Altogether Unaccompanied" =

EP album series by Helena Deland
- Released: March 2, 2018 (volumes I and II); October 19, 2018 (volumes III and IV)
- Recorded: Mid-2017
- Language: English
- Label: Luminelle
- Producer: Helena Deland; Jesse Mac Cormak

Helena Deland chronology
Drawing Room (2016)	From the Series of Songs "Altogether Unaccompanied" (2018)	Someone New (2021)

I went back to the studio last summer to record all the pieces I had written in the last five years. It has become a series of fragments that have in common the idea of the relationship, the feeling of being often completely lost in the company of others.

—Helena Deland on recording From the Series of Songs "Altogether Unaccompanied"

From the Series of Songs "Altogether Unaccompanied" is a series of extended plays from Canadian art pop musician Helena Deland.

== Reception ==
In Exclaim!, Zahraa Hmood rated the second two volumes a 6 out of 10, highlighting certain tracks, but criticizing others for being "pleasant-sounding, [but] blend[ing] in with the rest of the project" and states that this displays a promise that Deland could build up a strong body of work as a songwriter in the future. Philip Sherburne of Pitchfork rated the combined EPs a 7.8 out of 10, noting the diverse genres including "Americana-tinged indie rock, yacht pop, folk, woozy synth balladry" and Deland's "knack for sketching in broad strokes, just enough to capture the imagination without filling in too much detail and closing off possibilities", using open-ended lyrics.

== Track listing ==
Volumes I and II

1. "There Are a Thousand" – 3:36
2. "Perfect Weather for a Crime" – 2:23
3. "Take It All" – 4:35
4. "Body Language" – 4:27

Volumes III and IV

1. "Two Queries" – 1:42
2. "A Stone Is a Stone" – 4:13
3. "Lean On You" – 5:12
4. "Claudion" – 4:27
5. "Rise" – 3:39

== Personnel ==
- Helena Deland – guitar, vocals, production (Volumes III and IV)
- Alexis Coutu-Marion – design (Volumes I and II)
- Maya Fuhr – photography (Volumes I and II)
- Alexandre Larin – guitar (Volumes III and IV)
- Francis Ledoux – drums
- Jesse Mac Cormak – guitar, bass guitar, synthesizer, recording, mixing, production (Volumes III and IV)
- Crystal Zapata – artwork (Volumes III and IV)

== See also ==
- 2018 in Canadian music
- List of 2018 albums
