= Get Bleak =

EP by Ducks Ltd.
- Released: December 6, 2019
- Genre: Indie rock
- Length: 21:48
- Language: English
- Producer: Evan David Lewis

Ducks Ltd. chronology
Get Bleak (2019)	Modern Fiction (2021)

Get Bleak is the debut extended play by Canadian indie rock duo Ducks Ltd., released in 2019. The album has received positive reviews by critics and has been reissued in an expanded edition in 2021.

== Reception ==
Editors at AllMusic rated this album 4 out of 5 stars, with critic Fred Thomas writing the both releases of this EP included "wistful melodic sensibilities and lovelorn jangle that fueled foundational acts like the Go-Betweens, Orange Juice, Felt, or the more lively acts from the Sarah Records and Flying Nun rosters of the late '80s". Editors at Paste rated this the 18th best EP of 2019, with critic Steven Edelstone stating that "it’s a shame [the band] waited until the very end of November to release Get Bleak, an EP so perfectly suited for summer that it’s almost making me angry thinking about all of the rooftop parties and barbecues it could have soundtracked" and called it "a perfect combination of contemporary modern indie rock à la Rolling Blackouts Coastal Fever and classic jangle pop bands like Belle & Sebastian or The Sundays".

== Track listing ==
All songs written by Evan David Lewis and Tom McGreevy

1. "Get Bleak" – 3:04
2. "Gleaming Spires" – 2:55
3. "Annie Forever" – 3:07
4. "Anhedonia" – 3:15

Reissue bonus tracks

5. "Oblivion" – 3:00
6. "As Big as All Outside" – 3:20
7. "It's Easy" – 3:07

== Personnel ==
Ducks Ltd.

- Evan David Lewis – lead guitar; bass guitar on "Get Bleak"; acoustic guitar on "Oblivion", "As Big as All Outside", and "It’s Easy"; drum programming, engineering, mixing, production
- Tom McGreevy – rhythm guitar; acoustic guitar on "Get Bleak", "Gleaming Spires", "Annie Forever", and "Anhedonia"; keyboards on "Oblivion", "As Big as All Outside", and "It’s Easy"; bass guitar on "Oblivion", "As Big as All Outside", and "It’s Easy"; lead vocals

Additional personnel

- Mike Duffield – additional drums on "Get Bleak" and "Anhedonia", drums on "Annie Forever"
- Paul Erlichman – bass guitar on "Annie Forever"; string arrangement on "Get Bleak", "Gleaming Spires", "Anhedonia", and "As Big as All Outside"
- Laura Hermiston – backing vocals on "Get Bleak", "Annie Forever", and "Anhedonia"
- Joe Lambert – mastering
- Kurtis Marcoux – drum tracking on "As Big as All Outside"
- Mike Searle – bass guitar on "Gleaming Spires"

== See also ==
- 2019 in Canadian music
- List of 2019 albums
