= Moonshine (music collective) =

Afro-Diasporic Music Collective

- Formation: 2014
- Type: Artist collective, record label, event series
- Location: Montreal, Canada
- Website: moonshine.mu

Moonshine is a Montreal-based artist collective, event series, and record label founded in 2014 by Congolese-Canadian singer and DJ Pierre Kwenders, creative director Hervé Kalongo, musician and software developer Félix Noé, stage designer Steven Michel and DJ and visual artist San Farafina.

== History ==
Moonshine began in Montreal in 2014 as a monthly warehouse party spotlighting contemporary African and Afro-diasporic sounds. The collective is known for late-night club events announced by text message and typically scheduled on the Saturday after each full moon.

By the late 2010s the parties expanded to cities such as Paris, Los Angeles, Lisbon, and Kinshasa. The collective also launched an apparel brand and a music label, releasing collaborative albums under the SMS for Location title, and worked with cultural institutions such as Pride Toronto and Boiler Room.

== Reception ==
Moonshine has been profiled by international outlets including Vogue and BET for its role in amplifying Afro-diasporic sounds worldwide and reshaping Montreal’s nightlife. It got nominated at the Juno Awards in 2022 and 2024.

== See also ==
- Pierre Kwenders
