= Vagina Witchcraft =

Canadian heavy metal band

Vagina Witchcraft was a Canadian heavy metal band from Winnipeg, Manitoba. They are most noted for their self-titled debut album, which was released in 2020 and longlisted for the 2021 Polaris Music Prize.

The band consists of vocalist Kayla Fernandes, guitarist Dylan Sellar, bassist Seppel Saünlust and drummer Julien Riel. They were formed in 2018 after Fernandes was brought on stage to perform a song with Cancer Bats at the Manitoba Metalfest, leading to an invitation from Cancer Bats drummer Mike Peters to perform at another show with his side project AGAPITO.

In addition to their Polaris nod, the band also won a Western Canadian Music Award for Metal & Hard Music Artist of the Year in May 2021.
