= Harm's Way (album) =

Studio album by Ducks Ltd.
- Released: February 9, 2024
- Studio: Public House (Chicago); Palisade (Chicago)
- Genre: Power pop
- Length: 27:42
- Label: Carpark
- Producer: Dave Vettraino; Ducks Ltd.

Ducks Ltd. chronology
| Modern Fiction (2021) | Harm's Way (2024) |

Harm's Way is the second studio album by Canadian indie rock duo Ducks Ltd., released on February 9, 2024, through Carpark Records. The duo co-produced the album with Dave Vettraino. It received positive reviews from critics.

== Critical reception ==
Professional ratings
Aggregate scores
| Source | Rating |
|---|---|
| Metacritic | 79/100 |
Review scores
| Source | Rating |
| PopMatters | 7/10 |
| Uncut | 6/10 |
| Exclaim! | 9/10 |
| Paste Magazine | 8.7/10 |

Harm's Way received a score of 79 out of 100 on review aggregator Metacritic based on eight critics' reviews, indicating "generally favorable" reception. Uncut felt that the "mixes have the tracks – stacked guitars and vocals, bustling basslines, played and programmed drums – hurtling along as if crammed into a tunnel". Steve Horowitz of PopMatters wrote that "the songs have an upbeat vibe because of the vitality of their playing and singing. There is a latent pop element to their sound. It's like that old trope about how the blues makes the artists and the audience happy. The need to vent provides an essential service for all." Glide Magazine's Joey Willis stated that the album "takes listeners on a nostalgic journey through the jangle-pop scene of the 80s and 90s" as the duo "skillfully crafts electric guitar-based power pop that resonates with the fast, jittery riffs and propulsive percussion".

The album was a longlisted nominee for the 2024 Polaris Music Prize.

=== Year-end lists ===
Select year-end rankings for Harm's Way
| Publication/critic | Accolade | Rank | Ref. |
|---|---|---|---|
| Exclaim! | 50 Best Albums of 2024 | 10 | |

== Track listing ==
All tracks are written by Evan Lewis and Tom Mcgreevy.

Harm's Way track listing
| No. | Title | Length |
|---|---|---|
| 1. | "Hollowed Out" | 2:50 |
| 2. | "Cathedral City" | 3:27 |
| 3. | "The Main Thing" | 2:58 |
| 4. | "Train Full of Gasoline" | 2:50 |
| 5. | "Deleted Scenes" | 3:16 |
| 6. | "On Our Way to the Rave" | 3:10 |
| 7. | "A Girl, Running" | 2:57 |
| 8. | "Harm's Way" | 3:24 |
| 9. | "Heavy Bag" | 2:50 |
| Total length: | | 27:42 |

== Personnel ==
Ducks Ltd.

- Evan Lewis – lead guitar, drum programming, production, engineering (all tracks); acoustic guitar (tracks 1–8), background vocals (4, 8), bass (5–7), creative direction
- Tom Mcgreevy – lead vocals, rhythm guitar, keyboards, production (all tracks); bass (tracks 1, 3, 4, 9), acoustic guitar (9)

Additional musicians

- Brian Darling – cello (tracks 1, 2, 5, 7, 9)
- Macie Stewart – violin (tracks 1, 2, 5, 7, 9)
- Marcus Nuccio – drums (tracks 1, 3, 4, 7–9)
- Julia Steiner – vocals (tracks 1, 4, 5, 7–9)
- Margaret McCarthy – vocals (tracks 1, 4, 5, 7–9)
- Jason Balla – vocals (tracks 2, 3, 5, 8, 9)
- Julia Wittman – bass (tracks 2, 5)
- Jonathan Pappo – drums (tracks 2, 5)
- Nathan O'Dell – vocals (track 2)
- Rui De Magalhaes – vocals (track 5)
- Linsey-Paige Mccloy – vocals (track 6)
- Dave Vettraino – organ (track 4)

Technical

- Dave Vettraino – production, mixing, engineering
- Greg Obis – mastering
- Paul Elrichman – arrangements
- Macie Stewart – arrangements
- Jason Balla – additional vocal production
- Jonathan Schenke – additional engineering (tracks 2, 5)
- Julia Wittman – additional engineering (tracks 2, 5)

Visuals

- Lluis Tudela – album cover photo
- Alec Moss – design

== Charts ==
Chart performance for Harm's Way
| Chart (2024) | Peak position |
|---|---|
| UK Independent Albums (OCC) | 47 |
