= Zoon (band) =

Canadian band

Zoon is a Canadian shoegaze band from Hamilton, Ontario, whose core member is Anishinaabe musician Daniel Monkman. They are most noted for their 2020 album Bleached Wavves, which was a shortlisted finalist for the 2021 Polaris Music Prize.

== Career ==
Originally from Selkirk, Manitoba and a member of the Brokenhead Ojibway Nation, Monkman moved to Hamilton after stints living in Winnipeg, Manitoba and Calgary, Alberta. They abandoned music for a number of years during which they struggled with drug and alcohol addiction, before getting sober with the help of the traditional Anishinaabe Teachings of the Seven Grandfathers.

Monkman reestablished their musical career in Hamilton, initially using the band name Bloom before adopting the name Zoon from the Grandfathers' teaching of zoongide'ewin (bravery and courage). The band, whose music blends shoegaze rock with elements of traditional First Nations music in a style which Monkman refers to as "moccasin-gaze", features a varying lineup, with its current members being guitarist Daniel Wintermans, bassist Drew Rutt and drummer Andrew McLeod.

Selected tracks from Bleached Wavves were released as an EP in 2019, before the full album was released in 2020 on Paper Bag Records as the band's full-length debut. Monkman has also collaborated with Adam Sturgeon of Status/Non-Status in OMBIIGIZI, who released their debut album Sewn Back Together in 2022. Their 2023 album Bekka Ma'iingan was longlisted for the 2023 Polaris Music Prize, and received a Juno Award nomination for Contemporary Indigenous Artist of the Year at the Juno Awards of 2024.

Monkman released his third album, Happy Thought School, on June 2026 via Paper Bag Records.

== Discography ==
=== Studio albums ===
- Bleached Wavves (2020)
- Bekka Ma'iingan (2023)

=== Extended plays ===
- Big Pharma (2022)
- A Sterling Murmuration (2022)
