= Notre-Dame-des-Sept-Douleurs (album) =

2020 studio album by Klô Pelgag

Studio album by Klô Pelgag
- Released: June 26, 2020
- Recorded: 2019
- Genre: Chamber pop; baroque pop; art pop; Electronic rock
- Length: 42:20
- Language: French
- Label: Secret City Records
- Producer: Klô Pelgag; Sylvain Deschamps

Klô Pelgag chronology
L'étoile thoracique (2016)	Notre-Dame-des-Sept-Douleurs (2020)

Singles from Notre-Dame-des-Sept-Douleurs
- 1. "Rémora" Released: February 6, 2020; 2. "J’aurai les cheveux longs" Released: March 30, 2020; 3. "Umami" Released: May 5, 2020; 4. "La maison jaune" Released: June 4, 2020; 5. "Mélamine" Released: November 12, 2020

Professional ratings
Review scores
Source	Rating
Exclaim!	8/10
La Presse	4/5 stars
Le Canal Auditif	9/10
Les Oreilles Curieuses	8/10

Notre-Dame-des-Sept-Douleurs is the third studio album by Canadian singer-songwriter Klô Pelgag, released on June 26, 2020. The album received critical acclaim upon its release.

== Release ==
Notre-Dame-des-Sept-Douleurs was initially set for release on April 17, 2020. However, due to the COVID-19 pandemic, the release of the album was later pushed back to June 26, as announced via Pelgag's official website on April 10.

=== Singles ===
Prior to the official launch of the album, four singles were put out. "Rémora" serves as the lead single, which was released on February 6, 2020. She wrote the song after reading One Hundred Years of Solitude by Gabriel García Márquez, in which he mentioned the remora, a kind of fish that lives on other bigger fishes, using the disk on its head to attach to them. Pelgag explained: "The song "Rémora" is about dependency to a toxic, bloodsucking relationship, to which you hang on even though it drags you down to the bottom of yourself. Eventually, you have to heal from it." Its music video was directed by Baz.

"J’aurai les cheveux longs" is the second single, released on March 30, 2020, which is about "reconciliation." The string section was arranged by Canadian composer Owen Pallett.

"Umami" is the third single, released on May 5, 2020. She wrote the song after rereading The Old Man and the Sea by Ernest Hemingway. She said: "I felt like I was this old man going into himself, for I don’t know how long. I wanted to return with answers. I knew that life had the potential to be greater than what we’re being offered."

"La maison jaune" is the fourth single, released on June 4, 2020. She refers this song to the house that Vincent van Gogh lived when he suffered from depression. According to Pelgag, the song is about "the moment when you finally leave this place in the hope of never returning there." The string and brass sections were arranged by Pelgag for the first time. The music video was directed by Baz.

On November 12, 2020, "Mélamine" was released as the fifth single. Pelgag revealed the meaning of the song through her website, saying it is about "when just being yourself isn’t enough anymore, when your vision of yourself and of others is distorted, and your pain seems unique and overwhelming. And finally, the struggle to free yourself from this despair that has become casually comfortable." The music video for the song was directed by Soleil Denault.

== Awards and reception ==
The album received two Juno Award nominations at the Juno Awards of 2021, for Francophone Album of the Year and Album Artwork of the Year; it went on to win the latter. In July 2021, it was shortlisted for the 2021 Polaris Music Prize.

== Track listing ==
Credits are adapted from Genius. All tracks are written by Klô Pelgag.

No.	Title	Producer(s)	Length
1.	"Notre-Dame-des-Sept-Douleurs"	Klô Pelgag; Sylvain Deschamps	1:44
2.	"Rémora"	Deschamps; Pelgag	4:29
3.	"Umami"	Deschamps; Pelgag	4:28
4.	"J'aurai les cheveux longs"	Deschamps; Pelgag	3:55
5.	"À l'ombre des cyprès"	Pelgag; Deschamps	5:39
6.	"La fonte"	Pelgag; Deschamps	2:28
7.	"Soleil"	Deschamps; Pelgag	3:31
8.	"Für Élise"	Deschamps; Pelgag	2:54
9.	"Mélamine"	Deschamps; Pelgag	2:50
10.	"Où vas-tu quand tu dors ?"	Pelgag; Deschamps	3:06
11.	"La maison jaune"	Deschamps; Pelgag	4:26
12.	"Notre-Dame-des-Sept-Douleurs II"	Deschamps; Pelgag	2:50
Total length:			42:20
