= Pierre Kwenders =

Congolese-Canadian musician

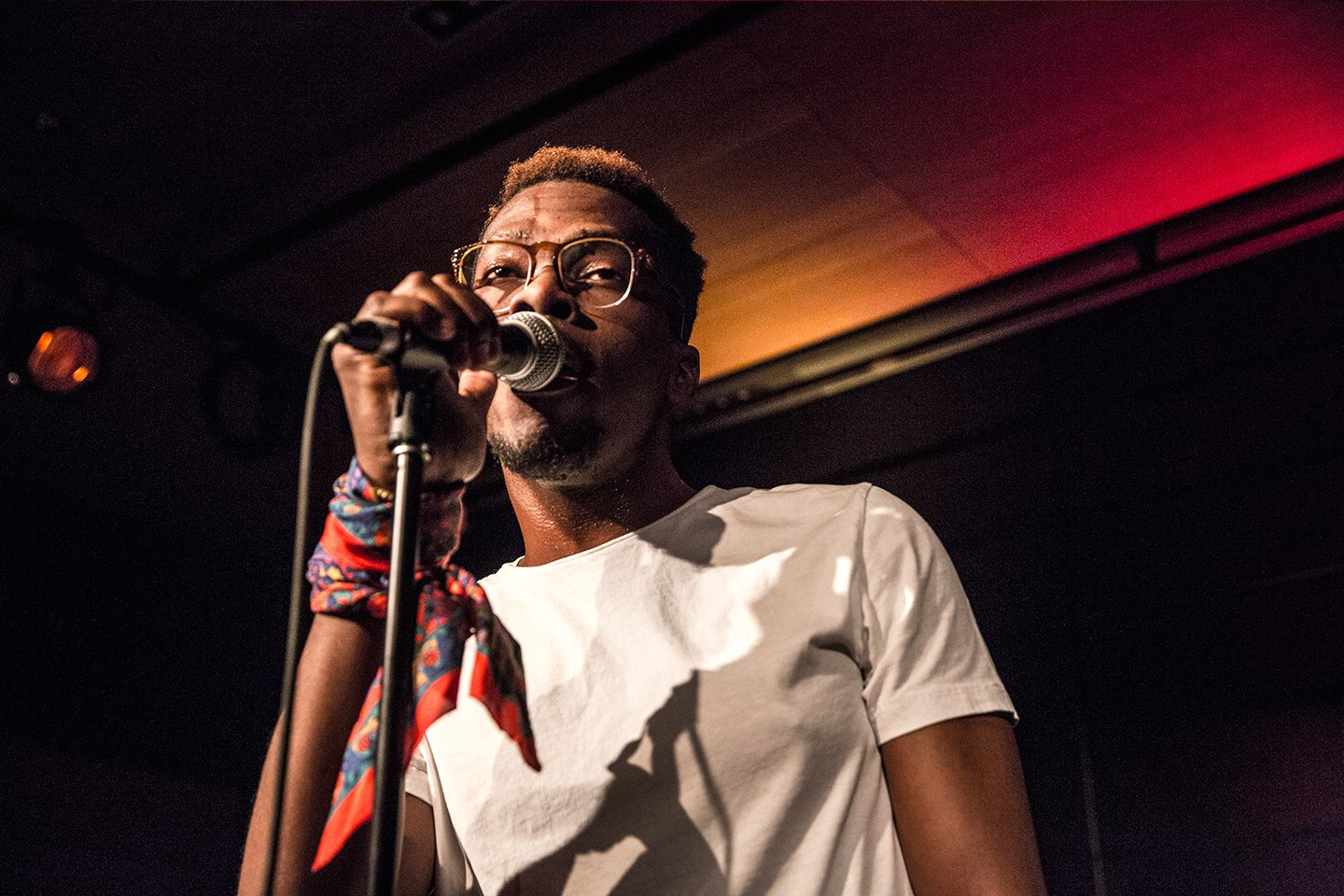

Background information
- Born: José Louis Modabi; 31 October 1985 (age 41)
- Origin: Kinshasa, Zaire
- Genres: pop music; world music
- Years active: 2012–present
- Website: www.pierrekwenders.com

Pierre Kwenders is the stage name of José Louis Modabi (born 31 October 1985, in Kinshasa, Zaire), a Congolese-Canadian musician. His 2014 album Le Dernier empereur bantou was a shortlisted nominee for the Juno Award for World Music Album of the Year at the Juno Awards of 2015, and a longlisted nominee for the 2015 Polaris Music Prize. Kwenders, who sings and raps in English, French, Lingala and Tshiluba, is noted for blending both African music and western pop music influences, including hip hop and electronic music, into his style. He is also one of the co-founders of the artist collective Moonshine.

== Career ==
After immigrating to Canada with his mother as a teenager, he first attracted widespread attention for his guest contributions to Radio Radio's 2012 album Havre de Grace.

He released the EPs Whiskey & Tea and African Dream in 2013, and followed up with Le Dernier empereur bantou, his first full-length album, in 2014. He supported the album with a cross-Canada tour in 2015. His song "Mardi Gras", a collaboration with Jacques Alphonse "Jacobus" Doucet of Radio Radio, was a shortlisted nominee for the 2015 SOCAN Songwriting Prize in the francophone division.

He collaborated with Boogat on "Londres", a track on Boogat's 2015 album Neo-Reconquista.

His second full-length album, Makanda at the End of Space, the Beginning of Time, was released in 2017. The album was a shortlisted finalist for the 2018 Polaris Music Prize.

In 2018, he had his first acting role in the film Les Salopes, or the Naturally Wanton Pleasure of Skin.

Following the release of Makanda, Kwenders came out as gay.

He won the 2022 Polaris Music Prize for his album José Louis and the Paradox of Love.
