= Black Holes (album) =

Studio album by The Blue Stones
- Released: October 20, 2015
- Recorded: Summer 2015
- Genre: Blues rock; psychedelic rock; space rock
- Length: 33:09
- Label: eOne
- Producer: Brett Humber; Ian Blurton; Tarek Jafar; Justin Tessier

The Blue Stones chronology
| Black Holes Demos (2016) | Black Holes (2015) | Hidden Gems (2021) |

Singles from Black Holes
- 1. "Black Holes (Solid Ground)" Released: 2016; 2. "Rolling with the Punches" Released: 2018; 3. "Be My Fire" Released: 2018

Professional ratings
Review scores
| Source | Rating |
|---|---|
| Atwood | 7.1/10 |
| BeatRoute | Positive |
| Canadian Beats | 7/10 |
| Side Stage | Positive |

Black Holes is the debut studio album by Canadian blues rock band, The Blue Stones. The album was released on October 20, 2015. The album was re-released on October 26, 2018, through Entertainment One.

== Music videos ==
The first music video released was "Black Holes (Solid Ground)" which was re-released as a music video on November 27, 2018, through Billboard.

== Track listing ==
All music is composed by Tarek Jafar and Justin Tessier.

| No. | Title | Length |
|---|---|---|
| 1. | "Airlock" | 0:56 |
| 2. | "The Drop" | 3:40 |
| 3. | "Black Holes (Solid Ground)" | 3:06 |
| 4. | "The Hard Part" | 3:44 |
| 5. | "Be My Fire" | 3:13 |
| 6. | "Lay" | 3:28 |
| 7. | "Rolling with the Punches" | 3:21 |
| 8. | "Little Brother" | 2:51 |
| 9. | "Midnight" | 3:48 |
| 10. | "Orbit" | 0:48 |
| 11. | "Magic" | 4:14 |
| Total length: | | 33:09 |

== Personnel ==
The following were credited for the album.

- The Blue Stones – composer, liner notes, producer
- Ian Blurton – engineer, producer
- Eric Boulanger – mastering
- Adam Hawkins – mixing
- Dave Houle – artwork
- Brett Humber – engineer, producer
- Joseph McCarthy – package layout
- George Cappellini Jr. - A&R
- Eddie Laureno - A&R
