= José Louis and the Paradox of Love =

Studio album by Pierre Kwenders
- Released: April 29, 2022
- Genres: Pop, electronica, African music
- Length: 44:31
- Label: Arts & Crafts

Pierre Kwenders chronology
MAKANDA at the End of Space, the Beginning of Time (2017)	José Louis and the Paradox of Love (2022)

José Louis and the Paradox of Love is the third studio album by Canadian singer-songwriter Pierre Kwenders, released April 29, 2022 on Arts & Crafts Productions. The album features lyrics in French, English, Lingala, Kikongo and Tshiluba.

The album was the winner of the 2022 Polaris Music Prize, and was a shortlisted Juno Award nominee for Global Music Album of the Year at the Juno Awards of 2023.

== Track listing ==
No.	Title	Length
1.	"L.E.S (Liberté Égalité Sagacité)" (featuring Win Butler, King Britt)	9:28
2.	"Your Dream" (featuring Ngabo)	3:38
3.	"No No No"	3:00
4.	"Imparfait" (featuring Sônge)	2:59
5.	"Papa Wemba"	3:50
6.	"Religion désir"	3:30
7.	"Makambo Ya Gaga"	0:09
8.	"Heartbeat" (featuring anaiis)	3:04
9.	"Kilimanjaro"	2:45
10.	"Coupé"	3:40
11.	"Sahara"	3:16
12.	"Radio trottoir (Interlude)" (featuring Babel Bukasa)	1:18
13.	"Church (Likambo)" (featuring Africa Intshiyetu Choir)	3:50
