= Helena Deland =

Canadian musical artist

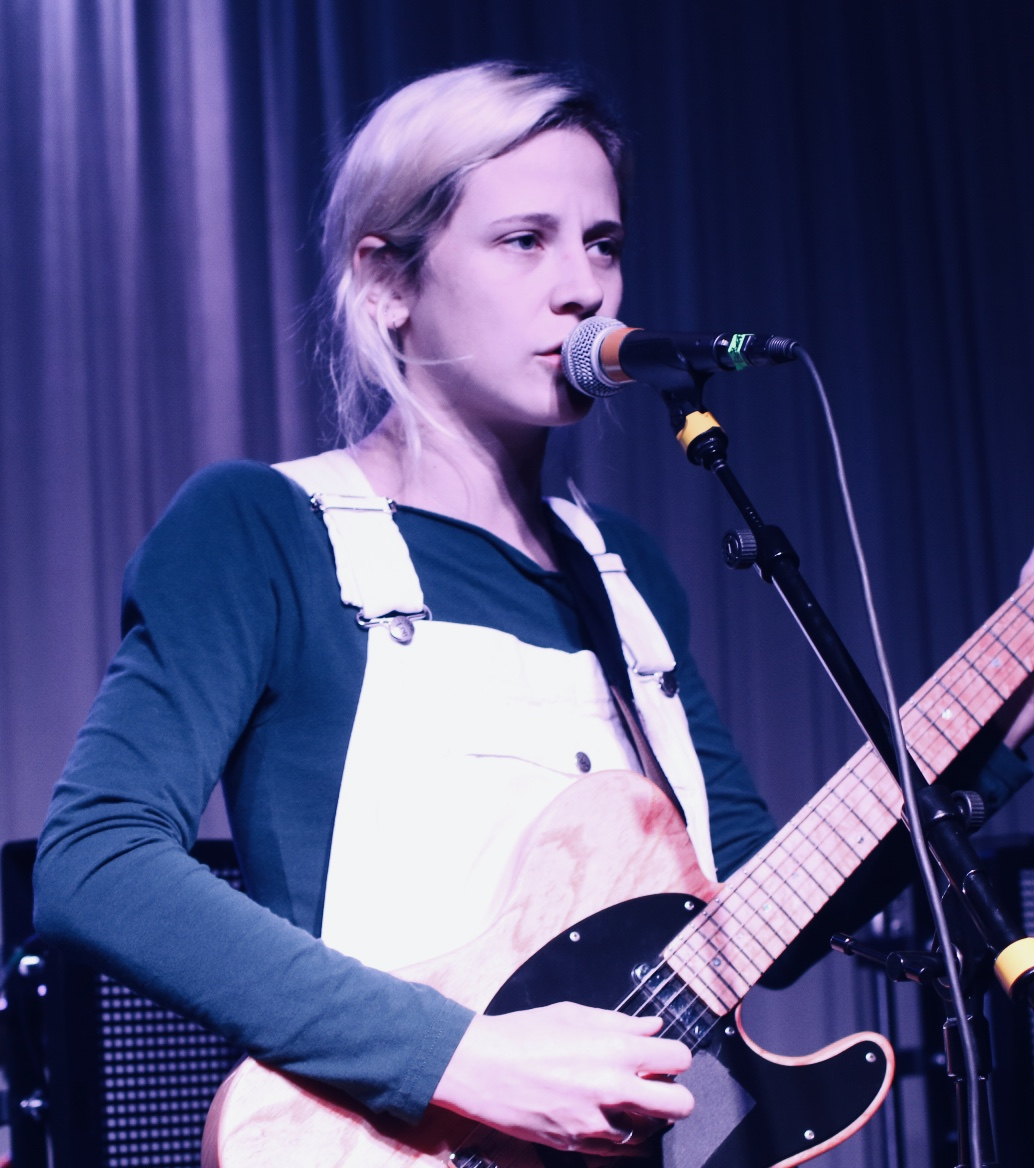
- Deland performing in 2019

Background information
- Born: Vancouver, British Columbia
- Genres: Art pop, indie folk
- Instruments: Vocals; guitar; bass; piano
- Labels: Luminelle Recordings, section1, Chivi Chivi
- Formerly of: Hildegard
- Website: helenadeland.com

Helena Deland McCullagh is a Canadian singer-songwriter. To date she has released five EPs: Drawing Room (2016) and From the Series of Songs "Altogether Unaccompanied" Vol. I, II, III & IV (2018) that she has written and composed. Her first full-length album Someone New was released on 15 October 2020. Her second full-length album Goodnight Summerland was released on 13 October 2023. Deland is currently signed to Luminelle Recordings (label founded by Gorilla vs. Bear & Fat Possum Records) for the world as well as Chivi Chivi for Canada. She has toured consistently since the beginning of her career in Canada, United States and Europe.

== Biography ==
Born in Vancouver, British Columbia, Deland spent the first years of her life in Summerland, British Columbia before moving to Quebec City where she grew up. Deland currently lives in Montreal. Her native languages are French and English; however, she primarily writes and sings in English. She began playing piano and guitar as a child and started singing when she moved to Montreal. Deland's inspirations are diverse, including Jessica Pratt, Joni Mitchell, and Sea Oleena.

Deland's musical upbringing is partially rooted in her Québécois heritage, particularly on her father's side. Family gatherings were characterized by the performance of traditional call-and-response songs, reflective of old Québécois customs. In addition to these cultural expressions, Deland's familial musical environment also featured a love for The Beatles, showcasing the influence of the late '60s and '70s on her musical tastes.

Deland studied literature at the Université du Québec à Montréal, an experience that significantly influenced her approach to songwriting

Deland is featured on "Free the Frail", a song from JPEGMafia's third studio album All My Heroes Are Cornballs.

Her 2020 album Someone New was longlisted for the 2021 Polaris Music Prize, and was a Felix Award nominee for Anglophone Album of the Year at the 43rd Félix Awards.

In 2021, she formed the electronic act Hildegard with Canadian producer Ouri. Their eponymous debut album, recorded over eight days, was released June 4, 2021. Their album Jour 1596 was longlisted for the 2025 Polaris Music Prize.

In 2022, Deland toured Europe with Andy Shauf and Leith Ross.

Deland released her second solo album, Goodnight Summerland, on 13 October 2023, under the Chivi Chivi label. Intentionally steering "Goodnight Summerland" towards a more acoustic direction, Deland collaborated with New York-based singer-songwriter Sam Evian, known for his work with artists such as Cass McCombs and Big Thief.

In an interview, Deland shared the emotional journey encapsulated in Goodnight Summerland. The album stands is a tribute to her late mother, delving into the complexities of grief and the challenges of navigating life after loss.

The album was a longlisted nominee for the 2024 Polaris Music Prize.

== Discography ==
Studio albums:

- 2020: Someone New
- 2021: Hildegard (with Ouri as Hildegard)
- 2023: Goodnight Summerland
- 2024: Jour 1596 (with Ouri, as Hildegard)

EPs: 2016: Drawing Room Drawing Room is Helena Deland's first EP released on 26 August 2016 under Montreal label Chivi Chivi. Produced by Jesse Mac Cormack, it includes four songs written and composed by Helena.

No.	Title	Length
1.	"Aix"	4:12
2.	"Black Metal"	3:42
3.	"Baby"	4:29
4.	"Drawing Room"	4:15
Total length:		16:38

- 2018: From the Series of Songs "Altogether Unaccompanied" Vol. I & II, III & IV

This series of four volumes, produced by Jesse Mac Cormack, was meant to be released as a complete album. The songs were so varied in genre that it was decided to release them separately with the objective of gathering songs that were similar in their themes and sounds. The singer's inspirations have a common theme: human relationships.

Vol. I & II were released on 2 March and Vol. III & IV were released on 19 October 2018 via Luminelle Recordings and Chivi Chivi.

On February 8, 2022, Deland released a new single titled "Swimmer", which later appeared on Goodnight Summerland.

== Videos ==
- 2016: "Baby"
- 2018: "Claudion"
- 2018: "Take it All"
- 2018: "There Are a Thousand"
- 2020: "Someone New"
- 2020: "Truth Nugget"
- 2020: "Comfort, Edge"
- 2021: "Jour 2" (Hildegard)
- 2020: "Jour 1" (Hildegard)
- 2020: "Jour 3" (Hildegard)
- 2020: "Jour 8" (Hildegard)
- 2022: "Swimmer"
- 2023: "Spring Bug"
- 2023: "Strawberry Moon"
- 2023: "The Animals"

Heland also did live sessions for La Blogothèque and CBC Music's First Play Live.
