= Thierry Larose =

Canadian indie rock singer-songwriter

Thierry Larose is a Canadian indie rock singer-songwriter from Marieville, Quebec.

After attending the University of Sherbrooke to study English, Larose participated in the 2019 Francouvertes festival. Although he did not win, he met Alexandre Martel, a musician and producer who had previously worked with established artists Hubert Lenoir and Alex Burger, and collaborated with Martel on the album Cantalou, which was released in 2021. The album was longlisted for the 2021 Polaris Music Prize, and Larose, Martel and Charles-Antoine Olivier won the 2021 SOCAN Songwriting Prize for the single "Les amants de pompéi".

His second album Sprint! was released in 2023, and was longlisted for the 2023 Polaris Music Prize.
