= Parallel World (Cadence Weapon album) =

Studio album by Cadence Weapon
- Released: April 30, 2021
- Studio: Dream House Studios
- Genre: Canadian hip-hop
- Length: 26:24
- Producers: Jacques Greene, Jimmy Edgar, Martyn Bootyspoon, Casey MQ, Korea Town Acid, Strict Face, Little Snake, DNNY PHNTM, AudioOpera

Cadence Weapon chronology
Cadence Weapon (2018)	Parallel World (2021)	Rollercoaster (2024)

Parallel World is the fifth studio album by Cadence Weapon, nee Roland Pemberton, released April 30, 2021. The album was the winner of the 2021 Polaris Music Prize.

The album is marked by political themes about Black Canadian life and experience. Pemberton described the concept as being told with a "journalistic lens" that was largely inspired by watching the George Floyd protests in 2020.

== Track listing ==
No.	Title	Length
1.	"Africville's Revenge"	1:26
2.	"On Me" (featuring Manga Saint Hilare and Strict Face)	2:56
3.	"Play No Games"	2:46
4.	"SENNA" (featuring Jacques Greene)	3:30
5.	"Skyline"	2:07
6.	"WATER" (featuring Fat Tony)	2:36
7.	"Eye to Eye"	1:59
8.	"Ghost" (featuring Backxwash)	2:14
9.	"Hard to Find"	2:44
10.	"Connect"	4:01
