= Cooler Returns =

Studio album by Kiwi Jr.
- Released: January 22, 2021
- Genres: Indie rock; jangle pop; slacker rock
- Length: 36:12
- Label: Sub Pop

Kiwi Jr. chronology
Football Money (2020)	Cooler Returns (2021)	Chopper (2022)

Professional ratings
Aggregate scores
Source	Rating
AnyDecentMusic?	7.7/10
Metacritic	79/100
Review scores
Source	Rating
AllMusic	4/5 stars
Beats Per Minute	69%
Clash	8/10
DIY	4/5 stars
Exclaim!	8/10
The Line of Best Fit	8/10
Pitchfork	7/10

Cooler Returns is the second studio album by Canadian indie rock band Kiwi Jr. It was released on January 22, 2021, through Sub Pop worldwide and the band's own label Kiwi Club in Canada.

== Release ==
The band announced the release of their second studio album on November 10, 2020.

=== Singles ===
On September 28, 2020, the band released the first single "Undecided Voters", along with a music video. Speaking of the single, the band said: "We all know Undecided Voters: democracy's driftwood, the third planks in the flotsam that purple the pie chart, always on sight and never a part of the scene. Placing imminent demise neatly to one side, Kiwi Jr. concentrate on the real Issues: the terrible alliance between King Crab and the timezones; 3D printing causing mass sculptor redundancies; and the playlist at the Duane Reade."

The second single, which would be the title track "Cooler Returns", was released on November 10, 2020.

On January 11, 2021, the band shared the music video to "Waiting in Line".

Kiwi Jr released the music video to "Maid Marian's Toast" on January 28, 2021.

== Critical reception ==
Cooler Returns was met with "generally favorable" reviews from critics. At Metacritic, which assigns a weighted average rating out of 100 to reviews from mainstream publications, this release received an average score of 79 based on 13 reviews. AnyDecentMusic? gave the release a 7.7 out of 10 based on 13 reviews.

In a review for AllMusic, Fred Thomas wrote: "What's different on this album is Kiwi Jr.'s pacing, which takes a little more time to get the songs where they're going and feels less anxious to move from one hook to the next. The instrumentation also expands past standard rock fare on Cooler Returns, with many songs layering countermelodies played on harmonica or dropping unexpected instruments into the mix. Kiwi Jr.'s reluctant maturation on Cooler Returns is subtle, and all of their moderate moves forward are overwhelmed by their resilient melodies and complex songwriting architecture." Tim Sentz of Beats Per Minute wrote: "Making a splash early last year with their debut Football Money, Kiwi jr. are back already with Cooler Returns, another collection of jams that conjure those prime college days. The hook-laden performances on Cooler Returns are full of zeal and wit." Jamie Wilde of Clash explained: "Cooler Returns displays a keen eye for observation – both grand and quaint – as its myriad of tracks cohere together through a bond of musical influences old and new to form an album that's invitingly optimistic, while also displaying intricacy and craftiness in abundance."

Writing for DIY, Joe Goggins explained: "If 'Football Money' was a full-hearted paean to the likes of Pavement and Archers of Loaf, then 'Cooler Returns' is the sound of Kiwi Jr moving forwards, planting their own flag in the power-pop ground." Alex Hudson of Exclaim! noted: "Cooler Returns continues the momentum of 2019's Football Money with another fast-and-furious collection of rock songs that take familiar sounds - jangling indie pop, spiky post-punk riffs, wheezing harmonica - and twist them into subtly wonky shapes. These 13 songs take a few listens to sift through and fully appreciate."

== Track listing ==
Cooler Returns track listing
No.	Title	Music	Length
1.	"Tyler"	Brian Murphy; Brohan Moore; Jeremy Gaudet; Mike Walker	2:05
2.	"Undecided Voters"	Brian Murphy; Brohan Moore; Jeremy Gaudet; Mike Walker	2:29
3.	"Maid Marian's Toast"	Brian Murphy; Brohan Moore; Jeremy Gaudet; Mike Walker	2:23
4.	"Highlights of 100"	Brian Murphy; Brohan Moore; Jeremy Gaudet; Mike Walker	2:39
5.	"Only Here for a Haircut"	Brian Murphy; Brohan Moore; Jeremy Gaudet; Mike Walker	3:09
6.	"Cooler Returns"	Brian Murphy; Brohan Moore; Jeremy Gaudet; Mike Walker	3:53
7.	"Guilty Party"	Brian Murphy; Brohan Moore; Jeremy Gaudet; Mike Walker	2:18
8.	"Omaha"	Brian Murphy; Brohan Moore; Jeremy Gaudet; Mike Walker	2:34
9.	"Domino"	Brian Murphy; Brohan Moore; Jeremy Gaudet; Mike Walker	2:11
10.	"Nashville Wedding"	Brian Murphy; Brohan Moore; Jeremy Gaudet; Mike Walker	3:14
11.	"Dodger"	Brian Murphy; Brohan Moore; Jeremy Gaudet; Mike Walker	2:36
12.	"Norma Jean's Jacket"	Brian Murphy; Brohan Moore; Jeremy Gaudet; Mike Walker	3:10
13.	"Waiting in Line"	Brian Murphy; Brohan Moore; Jeremy Gaudet; Mike Walker	3:30

== Personnel ==
Credits adapted from AllMusic.

Musicians

- Jeremy Gaudet − vocals, guitar
- Brian Murphy – guitar, piano, vocals
- Mike Walker – bass, vocals
- Brohan Moore – drums, vocals
- Jay McCarrol – piano

Production

- Graham Walsh – engineer, mixer
- Philip Shaw Bova − mastering
- Shari Kasman – photography
