= Korea Town Acid =

Musical artist

Korea Town Acid is the stage name of Jessica Cho, a South Korean-Canadian electronic musician and DJ based in Toronto, Ontario. She is most noted for her single "Sobriety", which was a Juno Award nominee for Underground Dance Single of the Year at the Juno Awards of 2022.

Born in Seoul, she moved to Toronto in childhood.

She released her debut EP, Mahogani Forest, in 2018, and followed up with the full-length album Metamorphosis in April 2021 on Urbnet Records. She followed up in October with the album Cosmos.

She produced the track "Play No Games" on Cadence Weapon's Polaris Music Prize-winning album Parallel World.
