= Kiwi Jr. =

Canadian indie rock band based in Toronto

Kiwi Jr. is a Canadian indie rock band based in Toronto, Ontario. The band consists of Jeremy Gaudet (vocals), Mike Walker (bass), Brohan Moore (drums), and Brian Murphy (guitar). Their first album Football Money was released on the Canadian Mint Records. The band's fourth album, Blowin' Up, released on August 14, 2026 on K Records. Between 2021 and 2026, they were signed to the American record label Sub Pop.

== Discography ==
- Football Money (2020)
- Cooler Returns (2021)
- Chopper (2022)
- Blowin' Up (2026)
