= Alpha (Charlotte Day Wilson album) =

Studio album by Charlotte Day Wilson
- Released: July 9, 2021
- Genres: Alternative R&B; soul
- Length: 33:12
- Label: Stone Woman
- Producers: Charlotte Day Wilson; Thomas Brenneck; D'Mile; Sir Dylan; Jack Ro

Charlotte Day Wilson chronology
Stone Woman (2018)	Alpha (2021)	Cyan Blue (2024)

Singles from Alpha
- 1. "Take Care of You" Released: August 13, 2020; 2. "If I Could" Released: May 20, 2021; 3. "Keep Moving" Released: June 11, 2021

Alpha (stylized in all caps) is the debut studio album by Canadian singer/songwriter Charlotte Day Wilson, released on July 9, 2021, via her independent imprint Stone Woman Music.

The album was preceded by three singles: "Take Care of You" featuring Los Angeles singer/producer Syd was released August 13, 2020 with the non-album b-side "Summertime", while follow-up singles "If I Could" and "Keep Moving" were released May 20 and June 11, 2021, respectively.

== Background ==
After a decade in the music industry, Alpha is Wilson's first full-length album. The album is preceded by three EPs, the latter two which are commercially available. Like her previous work, all of her tracks are written, produced, and released by Wilson and employ collaborations with fellow Toronto-based artists. This included frequent collaborators BadBadNotGood and Daniel Caesar as well as Mustafa and singer Merna Bishouty.

== Release and reception ==
Alpha
Aggregate scores
Source	Rating
Metacritic	79/100
Review scores
Source	Rating
Clash	8/10
Pitchfork	7.6/10
The Line of Best Fit	7/10

Announced in May 2021, the album was released on July 9, 2021, by Wilson and distributed by The Orchard.

Alpha received favorable reviews from contemporary music critics. At Metacritic, which assigns a normalized rating out of 100 to reviews from mainstream critics, the album received an average score of 79, based on 4 reviews.

Reviewers were particularly complimentary of her voice on the album. At Pitchfork, reviewer Dan Van Nguyen noted, "A sense of spiritual power defines much of Alpha... the body of the artist with the bourbon-soaked lounge-singer shimmer now sounds inhabited by the spirit of a transcendent preacher... yet Day Wilson funnels the evangelism into a focus on the self, always looking inward." Chris Taylor at The Line of Best Fit said, "There's no denying the talent on display across the album. Wilson's voice is a singular one; all at once offering heartache, confusion, hope and growth... Wilson's harmonies take on an almost choral quality where they had once been a whisper."

The album was shortlisted for the 2022 Polaris Music Prize.

The song "Adam Complex" was selected by the Academy of Canadian Cinema and Television to soundtrack the "In Memoriam" segment at the 10th Canadian Screen Awards in 2022.

== Track listing ==
Adapted from TIDAL.

Alpha track listing
No.	Title	Writer(s)	Producer(s)	Length
1.	"Strangers"	Charlotte Day Wilson	Wilson	2:06
2.	"I Can Only Whisper" (featuring BadBadNotGood)	Wilson; BadBadNotGood; Chester Hansen; Alex Sowinski; Leland Whitty; Dylan Wiggins; Jack Rochon; Matthew Tavares; Teo Halm	Wilson; Tommy Brenneck	2:45
3.	"If I Could"	Wilson; Rochon; Merna Bishouty	Wilson; Rochon	3:03
4.	"Lovesick Utopia"	Wilson	Wilson; Rochon	2:55
5.	"Mountains"	Wilson; Brandon Banks; Dernst Emile II; Kenneth Edmonds; Kyle Moscovitch; Marcus Reddick; Michael Gordon; Teo Halm; Varren Wade	Wilson; D'Mile; Teo Halm	4:09
6.	"Danny's Interlude" (featuring Daniel Caesar)	Wilson; Caesar	Wilson	0:35
7.	"Changes"	Wilson	Wilson	2:59
8.	"Take Care of You" (featuring Syd)	Wilson; Rochon; Bishouty; Sydney Bennett	Wilson; Rochon	3:34
9.	"Keep Moving"	Wilson; Rochon; Mustafa	Wilson	4:39
10.	"Wish It Was Easy"	Wilson; Wiggins; Sharon, Lois & Bram	Wilson; Wiggins	3:12
11.	"Adam Complex"	Wilson	Wilson	3:16
Total length:				33:12

Alpha (Deluxe)
No.	Title	Writer(s)	Producer(s)	Length
12.	"Even Is the Lie"	Wilson; Rochon	Wilson; Rochon	4:06
13.	"Take Care of You - Remix" (featuring King Princess, Amaarae & Meshell Ndegeocello)	Wilson; Rochon; Bishouty; Ama Serwah Genfi; Meshell Ndegeocello; Mikaela Straus	Wilson; Rochon	3:34
Total length:				40:53
