= Russell Louder =

Canadian musician and performance artist

- Born: Prince Edward Island
- Occupations: Musician; performance artist

Russell Louder is a Canadian musician and performance artist from Prince Edward Island, whose album Humor was longlisted for the 2021 Polaris Music Prize.

Louder, who is non-binary, released the EP Think of Light in 2017, and followed up with a number of singles before Humor was released in February 2021.

They are currently based in Montreal, Quebec. Their older brother, Leon Louder, is also a musician.
