= The Blue Stones =

Canadian blues rock band

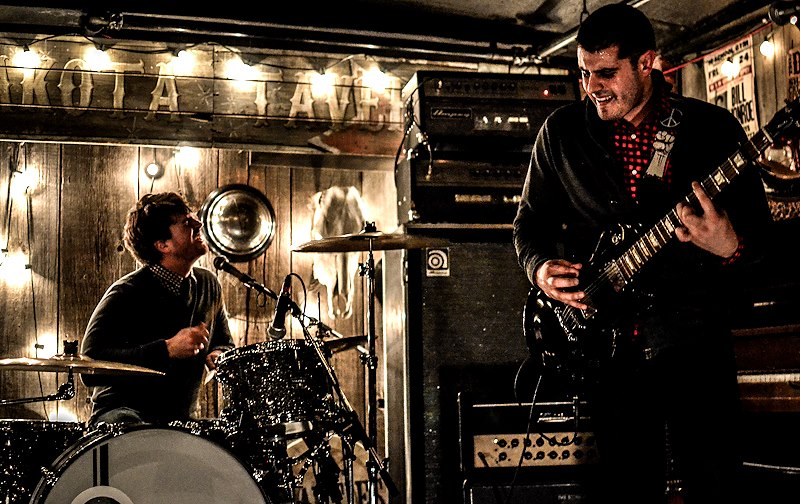
- The Blue Stones playing at The Dakota Tavern in Toronto in 2013

Background information
- Origin: Windsor, Ontario, Canada
- Genres: Blues rock; psychedelic rock; space rock
- Years active: 2011–present
- Label: MNRK Music Group
- Members: Tarek Jafar; Justin Tessier
- Website: www.thebluestonesmusic.com

The Blue Stones are a Canadian blues rock duo based in Windsor, Ontario.

== History ==
In August 2018, The Blue Stones signed a record contract with Entertainment One, where they subsequently announced plans to re-release their debut LP Black Holes on October 26, 2018. They subsequently toured the US with their Be My Fire Tour. In early January 2020, The Blue Stones were nominated for the 2020 Juno Award in the category of Breakthrough Group of the Year.

In early 2021, the band announced their sophomore LP Hidden Gems, co-written and produced by Mutemath frontman Paul Meany. The ten song album was preceded by singles "Shakin' Off The Rust," "Grim," "Careless," "Let It Ride," and "Spirit." Hidden Gems was released on March 19, 2021.

Their third album, titled Pretty Monster, was released in November 2022 and was preceded by singles "Don't Miss," "Good Ideas," and "What's It Take To Be Happy?" The album was later nominated for a 2024 JUNO Award in the category of Rock Album of the Year.

In 2025, The Blue Stones announced their fourth studio album, Metro, which was released on March 28, 2025. The album has been supported by the singles "Your Master" and "Kill Box," both released in 2024, and "Come Apart," released in early 2025.

== Members ==
- Tarek Jafar – vocals, guitar, bass, keys
- Justin Tessier – percussion, backing vocals

== Discography ==
=== Studio albums ===
- Black Holes (2015, re-released 2018)
- Hidden Gems (2021)
- Pretty Monster (2022)
- Metro (2025)

=== Extended plays ===
- The Blue Stones EP (2011)
- How's That Sound? (2012)

=== Singles ===
Title	Year	Peak chart positions					Album
Title	Year	CAN Rock	US Air.	US Alt.	US Main.	US Rock	Album
"Saw Mill"	2014	—	—	—	—	—	Non-album single
"The Hard Part"	2015	—	—	—	—	—	Black Holes
"Black Holes (Solid Ground)"	2016	3	44	34	22	—	Black Holes
"Rolling with the Punches"	2018	—	—	—	—	—	Black Holes
"Be My Fire"	2018	4	—	39	—	—	Black Holes
"Shakin' Off the Rust"	2019	1	24	32	5	44	Hidden Gems
"Grim"	2019	—	—	—	—	—	Hidden Gems
"Careless"	2020	—	—	—	—	—	Hidden Gems
"Let It Ride"	2020	2	—	—	36	—	Hidden Gems
"Spirit"	2021	—	—	—	—	—	Hidden Gems
"Don't Miss"	2022	—	—	—	—	—	Pretty Monster
"Good Ideas"	2022	—	—	—	—	—	Pretty Monster
"What’s It Take to Be Happy?"	2022	—	—	—	—	—	Pretty Monster
"Your Master"	2024	—	—	—	—	—	Metro
"Kill Box"	2024	—	—	—	—	—	Metro
"Come Apart"	2025	4	—	—	—	—	Metro

=== Music videos ===
List of music videos
Title	Year	Director	Ref.
"Black Holes (Solid Ground)"	2018	Jason Lester	
"Be My Fire"	2019	Unknown	
"Shakin' Off the Rust"	2019	James Villeneuve	
"Your Master"	2024	Sameer W. Jafar	
"Happy Cry"	2025	Sameer W. Jafar	

== Awards and nominations ==
=== Berlin Music Video Awards ===
The Berlin Music Video Awards is an international festival that promotes the art of music videos.

Year	Nominated work	Award	Result	Ref.
2025	"Your Master"	Best Song	Nominated	
