= Custom (musician) =

- Birth name: Duane Eric Lavold
- Born: June 15, 1967; Edmonton, Alberta, Canada
- Died: December 18, 2021 (aged 54); Athens, Greece
- Genres: Alternative rock; rap rock
- Occupations: Singer; songwriter; musician
- Instruments: Vocals; guitar; bass; cello; keyboards; turntable
- Years active: 1997–2021
- Labels: ARTISTdirect
- Website: http://www.customtheband.com/

Duane Eric Lavold (June 15, 1967 – December 18, 2021), better known by his stage name Custom, was a Canadian-born, New York-based rock musician and filmmaker best known for his song “Hey Mister."

== Biography ==
Lavold expressed his fandom for The White Stripes, Remy Zero, Black Rebel Motorcycle Club and Deftones' White Pony album. As a child, Lavold's favorite musicians were the Sex Pistols, Pink Floyd, The Cure and Prince.

He was 6 feet 8 inches tall.

Growing up in rural Canada, Lavold's interests as a youngster varied from skiing to playing cello and keyboard. He recorded his earliest songs on cassette. After high school, Lavold turned his focus to the international commerce program at Brown University. While at the school, he met aspiring singer-songwriter Duncan Sheik, who would become a collaborator several years later.

Lavold began his career in filmmaking. He moved to Halifax and Vancouver to pursue the career. His favorite films were Scarface, The Godfather, Apocalypse Now, The Breakfast Club, Fight Club and Trainspotting. He directed the short film Loafing, which was the winner of the Audience Award at the 1997 Slamdance Film Festival, and the unreleased film Limp starring INXS singer Michael Hutchence. Hutchence's suicide occurred shortly after principal photography, creating complications that resulted in the film never seeing the light of day.

In 1999, Lavold moved to New York City's Chinatown to start a music career, living in a loft he dubbed "120" and building his own studio with his father. Lavold left Virgin Records in 2001 after accusing Nancy Berry, the label's vice chairman, of leaving threatening voicemails. He released those messages to music and send the CDs to Virgin's lawyers and her husband and former EMI head Ken Berry. Lavold threatened legal action and was released from his contract, choosing to sign with newly created ARTISTdirect after a "bidding war" for his rights. ARTISTdirect's Ted Field had previously worked at Interscope Records and was involved in the rise of Eminem.

Lavold chose a stage name to open up the possibility for performing with a full-band setup. Custom was picked because Duane's first name was a single letter off of the French word for customs, douane. His debut album Fast was recorded in his home studio on $4,000 worth of equipment. He performed most of the album by himself.

After the dissolution of ARTISTdirect, Lavold continued making music, though most of it was not released and he never issued another album.

He did explore many other artistic and business endeavors, such as launching a digital production brand in the late 2000s and producing several different films, including one that was known as "The Hockey Movie" in its scripted form.

== Fast ==
Fast

Studio album by Custom
- Released: March 19, 2002
- Genre: Alternative rock; rap rock
- Length: 43:07
- Label: ARTISTdirect Records
- Producer: Custom

Singles from Fast
- 1. "Hey Mister" Released: 2001; 2. "Beat Me" Released: 2002

Lavold's debut album Fast was released on March 19, 2002 on ARTISTdirect. It was written and produced by Custom. Grammy-winning singer/songwriter Duncan Sheik co-wrote the song "Beat Me" and contributed instrumentals and background vocals to some of the tracks. The album peaked at No. 124 on the Billboard 200 and No. 2 on the Heatseekers Albums chart.

Lavold said that "anyone who has eclectic music tastes stretching from, say, the Sex Pistols and punk rock to Notorious B.I.G. and hip-hop would be interested in this."

All songs written by Duane Lavold unless otherwise specified.

No.	Title	Writer(s)	Length
1.	"Beat Me"	Duane Lavold; Duncan Sheik	4:00
2.	"Hey Mister"		3:22
3.	"Streets"		3:55
4.	"Like You"		3:30
5.	"Mess"		2:41
6.	"Morning Spank"		4:09
7.	"Skate"		0:39
8.	"May 26"		3:52
9.	"Give"		3:10
10.	"Daddy"		3:11
11.	"One Day"		2:44
12.	"Crawl"		4:57
13.	"120"		3:00

== Controversy ==
Custom's song "Hey Mister" was banned from MTV in 2002 as the network's Standards and Practices division labeled the song and video "pedophilic and offensive to women". Lavold's original concept for the music video involved storming the White House and singing the song's lyrics to then-President George W. Bush and attempting to seduce his daughters Barbara Bush and Jenna Bush. However, the concept was scrapped after the September 11 attacks because "making fun of the president while you're at war is probably not a good idea," according to Lavold.

The music video featured the song's sexually suggestive lyrics being written on the woman's skin as well as upskirt shots exposing her underwear. MTV cited the "morally objectionable" lyrics as a key component in its banning and prohibited Lavold from re-shooting the video with different lyrics. The lyrics "Hey mister, I really like your daughter, I want to eat her like ice cream, maybe dip her in chocolate" were believed to be written about an underage girl, and while the subject of the video was 22 years old during filming, MTV believed that she was "prepubescent." Lavold said they generally took issue with the music video and the song itself, branding it "a woman-hating anthem."

"Hey Mister" was a radio hit, peaking at No. 20 on the Billboard Alternative Songs chart and No. 28 on the Mainstream Rock Tracks chart in 2002.

== Death ==
Lavold died on December 18, 2021, from cardiac arrest at the age of 54. He was in Athens, Greece, on a business trip.
