= 2021 Polaris Music Prize =

Canadian music award

- Date: September 27, 2021
- Country: Canada
- Hosted by: Angeline Tetteh-Wayoe
- Winner(s): Cadence Weapon, Parallel World
- Website: polarismusicprize.ca

The 2021 edition of the Canadian Polaris Music Prize was presented on September 27, 2021. Due to the COVID-19 pandemic in Canada, the award was presented in a livestreamed virtual event hosted by Angeline Tetteh-Wayoe of CBC Music.

The longlist was announced on June 16, 2021, with the shortlist following on July 15, 2021.

== Shortlist ==
- Cadence Weapon, Parallel World
- Leanne Betasamosake Simpson, Theory of Ice
- DijahSB, Head Above the Waters
- Dominique Fils-Aimé, Three Little Words
- Mustafa, When Smoke Rises
- The OBGMs, The Ends
- Klô Pelgag, Notre-Dame-des-Sept-Douleurs
- TOBi, ELEMENTS Vol. 1
- The Weather Station, Ignorance
- Zoon, Bleached Wavves

== Longlist ==
- Art Bergmann, Late Stage Empire Dementia
- Bernice, Eau de Bonjourno
- The Besnard Lakes, The Besnard Lakes Are the Last of the Great Thunderstorm Warnings
- Leanne Betasamosake Simpson, Theory of Ice
- Big Brave, Vital
- Cadence Weapon, Parallel World
- Charlotte Cardin, Phoenix
- CFCF, memoryland
- Clairmont the Second, IT’S NOT HOW IT SOUNDS
- Helena Deland, Someone New
- DijahSB, Head Above the Waters
- Kathleen Edwards, Total Freedom
- Dominique Fils-Aimé, Three Little Words
- Fiver with the Atlantic School of Spontaneous Composition, Fiver with the Atlantic School of Spontaneous Composition
- Thanya Iyer, KIND
- Yves Jarvis, Sundry Rock Song Stock
- Rochelle Jordan, Play With the Changes
- LAL, Meteors Could Come Down
- Daniel Lanois, Heavy Sun
- Thierry Larose, Cantalou
- Russell Louder, Humor
- Elliot Maginot, Easy Morning
- Mustafa, When Smoke Rises
- Laura Niquay, Waska Matisiwin
- Nyssa, Girls Like Me
- The OBGMs, The Ends
- Dorothea Paas, Anything Can't Happen
- Justin Bieber, Justice
- Klô Pelgag, Notre-Dame-des-Sept-Douleurs
- Savannah Ré, Opia
- Allison Russell, Outside Child
- Julien Sagot, Sagot
- Sargeant X Comrade, Magic Radio
- Shabason, Krgovich and Harris, Philadelphia
- Yu Su, Yellow River Blue
- Julian Taylor, The Ridge
- TEKE::TEKE, Shirushi
- TOBi, ELEMENTS Vol. 1
- Vagina Witchcraft, Vagina Witchcraft
- The Weather Station, Ignorance
- Zoon, Bleached Wavves

== Polaris Heritage Prize ==
Nominees for the Slaight Family Polaris Heritage Prize, an award to honour classic Canadian albums released before the creation of the Polaris Prize, were announced after the main Polaris Prize ceremony. The winners were announced on October 26.

- Jury: Faith Nolan, Africville
- Public: Nomeansno, Wrong
- Lillian Allen, Revolutionary Tea Party
- k.d. lang, Ingénue
- Jean Leloup, Le Dôme
- Corb Lund, Five Dollar Bill
- Michie Mee and L.A. Luv, Jamaican Funk - Canadian Style
- Joni Mitchell, Court and Spark
- Jackie Mittoo, Wishbone
- Stars, Set Yourself on Fire
- Rufus Wainwright, Rufus Wainwright
- Weakerthans, Left and Leaving
