= Chris Harris (musician) =

Canadian musician

Chris Harris is a Canadian musician from Vancouver, British Columbia. He is most noted for the 2020 album Philadelphia, a collaboration with Joseph Shabason and Nicholas Krgovich which was a longlisted nominee for the 2021 Polaris Music Prize.

He was active in Vancouver's music scene in the 2000s and 2010s as a keyboardist in the post-rock combo The Secret Three, as a solo artist who released an EP in 2004 under the moniker Parks and Rec, as a multi-instrumentalist with Krgovich's P:ano, as a bass player in Destroyer, and as a singer and guitarist in the short-lived post-hardcore band Womankind.

In 2021, Shabason, Krgovich and Harris again collaborated on the instrumental followup release Florence. Harris contributed to the track "I'm Dancing" on Shabason and Krgovich's 2022 album At Scaramouche, but was not credited as a principal performer.
