= Hidden Gems (The Blue Stones album) =

Studio album by The Blue Stones
- Released: March 19, 2021
- Recorded: 2019–2020
- Length: 39:09
- Label: eOne
- Producer: Paul Meany

The Blue Stones chronology
Black Holes (2018)	Hidden Gems (2021)	Pretty Monster (2022)

Singles from Hidden Gems
- 1. "Shakin' Off the Rust" Released: October 11, 2019; 2. "Grim" Released: December 13, 2019; 3. "Careless" Released: April 3, 2020; 4. "Let It Ride" Released: September 11, 2020; 5. "Spirit" Released: February 5, 2021

Professional ratings
Review scores
Source	Rating
Alt Revue	4.5/5 stars
Hard Beat	8/10
Metal Epidemic	5/5 stars
Upset	4/5 stars

Hidden Gems is the second studio album by Canadian blues rock band, The Blue Stones. The album was released on March 19, 2021, through eOne.

== Track listing ==
All music is composed by Tarek Jafar and Justin Tessier.

Hidden Gems track listing
No.	Title	Length
1.	"Lights On"	3:08
2.	"Shakin' Off the Rust"	3:42
3.	"One By One"	4:11
4.	"Careless"	3:35
5.	"Grim"	5:02
6.	"Let It Ride"	3:37
7.	"L.A. Afterlife"	3:09
8.	"Spirit"	4:03
9.	"Make This Easy"	3:27
10.	"Oceans"	5:09
Total length:		39:09
