= The Garrys (band) =

The Garrys are a Canadian indie rock band from Saskatoon, Saskatchewan, consisting of sisters Erica, Julie and Lenore Maier. They are most noted for their 2021 album Get Thee to a Nunnery, which was longlisted for the 2022 Polaris Music Prize.

The band, who describe their sound as "garage surf doom-wop", was formed in 2015 as an acoustic duo consisting of Lenore and Erica Maier, before Julie joined the following year on bass and drums. They released their first album, Warm Buds, in 2016, and followed up with Surf Manitou in 2017.

In 2020, they recorded a score for the 1922 silent film Haxan: Witchcraft Through the Ages.

Get Thee to a Nunnery, the Garrys' fourth album, was produced by Dallas Good of The Sadies. On May 3, 2024, the Garrys released a single, "Cakewalk", their first song with their brother Matthew on guitar.
