= Dorothea Paas =

Canadian singer-songwriter

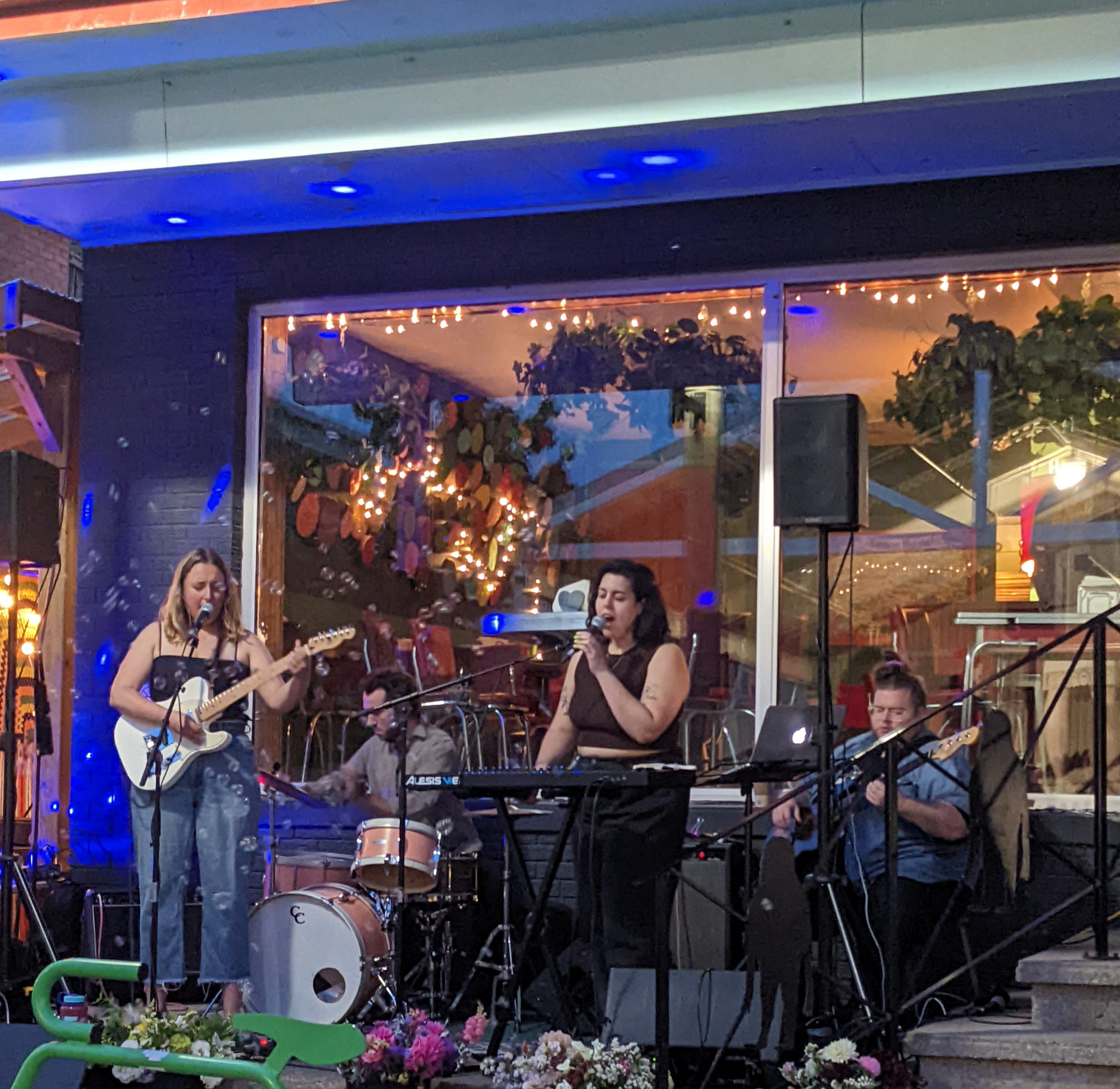
- Website: dorotheapaas.com

Dorothea Paas is a Canadian singer-songwriter from Toronto, Ontario. Her debut album Anything Can't Happen was a longlisted nominee for the 2021 Polaris Music Prize, and her 2024 album Think of Mist was longlisted for the 2025 Polaris Music Prize.

Paas was raised in Toronto, Ontario, where she was raised singing in choirs and playing guitar in a church group. Paas has released a number of EPs since 2012. A self-taught songwriter, her writing was influenced by her religious upbringing and popular music heard on the radio.

Although she has often resisted active self-promotion, she successfully built up a career as a backing vocalist for musicians such as Jennifer Castle and U.S. Girls. Anything Can't Happen, which features Paul Saulnier of PS I Love You on bass guitar, has been described by critics as "Joni Mitchell fronting Shellac at a coffee shop".

In addition to her solo career, she has also performed as a guest vocalist with Badge Époque Ensemble, and as vocalist and guitarist with Marker Starling.

Paas has also had occasional roles as a film actress, most notably in Kazik Radwanski's films How Heavy This Hammer and Anne at 13,000 Ft.

== Discography ==
- Same Sun (2012)
- A Thirst (2013)
- Strange Times/Just the Same/Drought (2013)
- Calm Your Body Down (2015)
- Prest (2016)
- No Loose Ends (2016)
- One for the Road (2018)
- Anything Can't Happen (2021)
- Think of Mist (2024)
