= Myst Milano =

Canadian rapper and DJ

Myst Milano is a Canadian rapper and DJ. Their debut album Shapeshyfter was released in 2021, and was longlisted for the 2022 Polaris Music Prize.

Originally from Edmonton, Alberta, Milano is a longtime DJ in Toronto's ballroom community, and is queer and non-binary. The album was launched in part with a performance at Toronto's Garrison club as an opening act for Cadence Weapon at the venue's first live show since the COVID-19 pandemic shutdown of the live music scene.

In October 2021, they also released the non-album single "No Atlas", a collaboration with Montreal producer Mind Bath.

Beyond the Uncanny Valley was a longlisted nominee for the 2024 Polaris Music Prize.

== Discography ==
=== Studio albums ===
- 2021 - Shapeshyfter (Halocline Trance)
- 2023 - Beyond the Uncanny Valley (Halocline Trance)
