= Hillsburn =

Community in Nova Scotia, Canada

Coordinates: 44°47′51.18″N 65°34′4.32″W

Hillsburn in Nova Scotia

Hillsburn is a community in the Canadian province of Nova Scotia, located in Annapolis County.
