= Ducks Ltd. =

Canadian indie rock band

Ducks Ltd. are a Canadian indie rock duo from Toronto, consisting of singer and rhythm guitarist Tom McGreevy and lead guitarist Evan Lewis.

== History ==
The group originated under the band name "Ducks Unlimited". Their first EP, Get Bleak, was released under that name. In April 2021, the band signed to both Carpark Records and Royal Mountain Records, where the aforementioned EP was re-released by the label. In October 2021, the group released their debut full-length album, Modern Fiction.

In January 2022, the group released a new song titled "Sheets of Grey". Along with Illuminati Hotties, the band released a cover of "Head On", by The Jesus and Mary Chain in March 2022.

Their second full-length album, Harm's Way, was released on February 9, 2024. The album was a longlisted nominee for the 2024 Polaris Music Prize.

== Discography ==
Albums

- Modern Fiction (2021)
- Harm's Way (2024)

EPs

- Get Bleak (2019, re-released 2021)
