= Ouri (musician) =

Canadian musical artist

Ourielle Auvé
- Born: French Guiana
- Origin: Montreal, Quebec, Canada
- Genres: Electronic, neo-classical
- Occupations: DJ, producer, multi-instrumentalist
- Instruments: Piano, harp, cello
- Years active: 2015-present

Ourielle Auvé, known professionally as Ouri, is a French Guianan-born Canadian musician whose music blends orchestral composition and electronic music. Her debut album Frame of a Fauna was released in 2021, and was longlisted for the 2022 Polaris Music Prize.

== Early life ==
Auvé, a classically trained musician, was born and raised in French Guiana, and later moved to France. She grew up playing the harp, cello and piano, and moved to Montreal at the age of sixteen to immerse herself in electronic music.

== Career ==
Auvé released the EPs Superficial in 2017 and We Share Our Blood in 2019, and has collaborated with Helena Deland in the side project Hildegard. Their album Jour 1596 was longlisted for the 2025 Polaris Music Prize. Previous to the project with Deland she released her debut full-length album, Frame of a Fauna, in 2021.

In 2024, she released the single "Quiet Drumming", a collaboration with Jonah Yano.

In 2025 she released her second solo album, Daisy Cutter, through Born Twice. The album was longlisted for the 2026 Polaris Music Prize, and the song "Paris" was longlisted for the SOCAN Polaris Song Prize.
