= Conor McNally =

Métis documentary filmmaker

Conor McNally is a Métis documentary filmmaker and photographer based in Edmonton, Alberta. His films include ôtênaw (2017), IIKAAKIIMAAT (2019), Very Present (2020), and nanekawâsis (2024). Many of his films profile Indigenous artists and knowledge-keepers and draw upon the concept of wahkohtowin, a Cree ethic of relationality.

== Early life and education ==
McNally's father is a professional actor which gave him access to the "behind the scenes" aspects of television productions and theatre. While still a child he began making home movies, and later was given a video camera as a gift.

He attended both junior high and high school at the Victoria School of the Arts. He says of the experience: "I went from making silly skateboard videos to now making more serious documentaries." McNally has a degree in Native studies from University of Alberta, and his formal filmmaking training began with a 16 mm filmmaking class at the Film and Video Arts Society in Edmonton.

== Career ==
McNally's 2017 film ôtênaw profiles the Edmonton-based Cree educator and oral storyteller Dwayne Donald and screened at the DOXA Documentary Film Festival that year. His 2019 short film IIKAAKIIMAAT follows the life and work of the Alberta-born Dene and Blackfoot artist Lauren Crazybull. Crazybull has in turn made a painting of McNally.

In 2020, NFB producer Coty Savard commissioned McNally's short film Very Present for its series The Curve, which documented experiences during the COVID-19 pandemic. The film explores the parallels between COVID-19 lockdowns and the house arrest and police brutality faced by McNally's brother Riley in 2012. In 2021, McNally directed two episodes of the CBC Gem true crime documentary series Farm Crime that concerned horse stealing and timber poaching.

In 2024, McNally released the film nanekawâsis, which traces the life of the two-spirit Cree artist George Littlechild, who was taken from his family as a child as part of the Sixties Scoop and reconnected with his heritage as an adult. The film was screened at the DOXA Documentary Film Festival and the Inside Out Film and Video Festival.

McNally has collaborated with a number of Indigenous musicians. The Juno-nominated and Polaris-shortlisted band nêhiyawak first formed to record a soundtrack to ôtênaw. McNally created the short film that accompanied their album nipiy for the 2020 Polaris Music Prize celebration. With Lisa Jackson, he co-directed the music video for Leanne Betasamosake Simpson's cover of Willie Dunn's song "I Pity the Country".
