= Birdie (novel) =

2015 novel by Tracey Lindberg

- Illustration by George Littlechild
- Author: Tracey Lindberg
- Audio read by: Alyssa Bresnahan
- Language: English
- Genre: Fiction
- Publisher: HarperCollins Publishers
- Publication date: 2015
- Media type: Print, ebook, audiobook
- Pages: 266 pages

Birdie is the 2015 debut novel of Indigenous Canadian author Tracey Lindberg. It was first published in hardback on May 26, 2015, by HarperCollins Publishers. Upon its release it was named a CBC Canada Reads Finalist, OLA Evergreen Award and a KOBO Emerging Writer Prize. The book is known for its inclusion of Cree Law and its commentary on Canadian Colonialism.

== Plot summary ==
Birdie follows the journey of the titular character Birdie, on her way to Gibsons, British Columbia from her home in northern Alberta. Birdie has ventured to Gibsons to find Pat John (Jesse from the Beachcombers) who she views as representative of a healthy Indigenous man. Birdie's journey to Gibsons served as the impetus for the spiritual journey that Birdie goes on, which exists outside of linear time.

== Characters ==
- Bernice/Birdie: Bernice is the main character, a Cree woman, and the story centres around her journey healing from extensive trauma. She is also referred to as Birdie, an affectionate nickname. In the dreamscape, she sometimes appears as her birdself.
- Auntie Val: Bernice's aunt, also known as littlemother whom Bernice lives with her for period of time. Val participates in Bernice's healing by coming to her niece and caring for her in her presumed despondency.
- Skinny Freda: Freda is Bernice's cousin and childhood friend. Bernice attempted to protect Freda throughout their childhood. Freda comes to rescue Bernice from her despondency, and is a key component in Bernice's healing throughout the novel.
- Maggie: Bernice's mother, representative of Missing and Murdered Indigenous Women and Girls. Maggie's character appears most often outside of linear time, showing up in dreamscapes and visions Bernice has about her past.
- Lola: Lola is Bernice's boss at Lola's Little Slice of Heaven where Bernice works as well as lives. Lola's character appears in the present timeline and facilitates the calls to Freda and Val to come and take care of Bernice when Bernice becomes despondent. Lola participates in Bernice's healing journey alongside Freda and Val.

== Themes ==
=== Cree traditional knowledge ===
==== Pimatisewin ====
In the novel, Pimatisewin represents the tree of life whose health is inexplicably tied to Bernice's. Pimatisewin is regarded as a relative by both Bernice and Maggie, and is used by Lindberg to portray non-human bonds of kinship and the obligations implicit in those bonds. Lindberg, in the author interview, explains that Pimatisewin is a Cree word that roughly translates to "the good life" in English. Eenou Pimaatisiiwin, as it is sometimes spelled, is an essential aspect of Cree traditional knowledge and represents an element of Cree survival.

==== Acimowin ====
Acimowin means story in Cree. Throughout the novel, usually at the end of chapters, these stories, or acimowin, get told as an oral history of the lessons Bernice learns throughout her journey. Acimowin represent the way in which Cree people pass down certain life lessons.

=== Cree law ===
A central tenet of Cree law, called Wahkohtowin, is used in the novel Birdie. The principle of Wahkohtowin is that people treat one another with respect and care. Through the use of story, Lindberg explores situations in which these laws are broken. Lindberg has said that the obligations of this law have been broken by people in Bernice's life, and her childhood home lacked reciprocal obligations.

=== Historical context ===
==== Indian Act ====
Auntie Val, when she tells a bit of her story, relates that her grandmother's people had not signed their rights away to the Treaty Commissioner. Val goes as far as to say that "her people. . .have not been colonized or 'Indian Acted' to death, but because they did not sign any treaties their family was not legally allowed to live on the reserve in Loon Lake. Lindberg expands on this point in the author interview when she states that Bernice's family had a home on the reserve but they could not inhabit that house because they were not status Indians. The Indian Act was one of the ways in which the Canadian government tried to control Indigenous identity while simultaneously dispossessing Indigenous peoples of their lands.

==== Missing and murdered indigenous women ====
Birdie deals with the ongoing Canadian political issue of Missing and murdered Indigenous women. 84% of Indigenous women experience violence, with 10% of all missing person cases in Canada being Indigenous women and girls. In the context of Birdie, Maggie represents this fraught history between Canada and Indigenous women. Maggie disappears at the end of the novel, Lindberg writing "she chose this city and this neighbourhood because she knows someone like her can disappear here" which speaks to the significance of the problem. Lindberg's choice to include a commentary on MMIW stems from her advocacy work in the area.

== Reception ==
Métis scholar and professor Aubrey Hanson wrote about Birdie in her article, "Reading for Reconciliation? Indigenous Literatures in a Post-TRC Canada." Hanson argues that Birdie demonstrates the possibilities of non-Indigenous people reading Indigenous texts for the resurgence of Indigenous communities. At CBC Canada Reads in 2016, 10,000 copies of Birdie were donated to Canadian schools by Bruce Poon Tip, the defender of Lindberg's novel. He believed that Birdie is important to the reconciliation process between Canada and Indigenous communities.
