= Pantayo (album) =

Studio album by Pantayo
- Released: May 8, 2020
- Genre: Kulintang
- Label: Telephone Explosion
- Producer: alaska B

Pantayo is the debut album by Canadian kulintang quintet Pantayo, released on May 8, 2020, on Toronto label Telephone Explosion. It was produced by alaska B of Yamantaka // Sonic Titan. The album was one of ten nominated for the 2020 Polaris Music Prize.

== Style ==
Pantayo combines the kulintang music of the South Philippines with "western" genres such as synth-pop, hip-hop, R&B, trip hop, and punk.

There is large diversity between the musical styles showcased on Pantayo. "Heto Na" (Tagalog for "here we go") was inspired by the Original Pilipino Music scene of the 1970s. "V V V (They Lie)" has a composition that the band compared to bubble tea. "Taranta" (whose name, according to Kat Estacio, “means to panic or to feel frantic, as a mindless response") features a rap-like vocal track, while "Bahala Na" (Tagalog for "it's up to you") more relaxed, being compared to lovers rock.

== Critical reception ==
Professional ratings
Review scores
Source	Rating
AllMusic	4/5 stars
Exclaim!	8/10
Pitchfork	7.6/10

Pantayo was ranked the 10th best album on Exclaim!'s 50 Best Albums of 2020 list. AllMusic listed it as one of their "Favorite Latin & Global Albums" of the year. Bandcamp named it their Album of the Day on May 18, 2020.

== Track listing ==
Pantayo track listing
No.	Title	Length
1.	"Eclipse"	4:08
2.	"Divine"	3:47
3.	"Heto Na"	4:15
4.	"Bronsé"	2:36
5.	"V V V (They Lie)"	3:11
6.	"Taranta"	3:20
7.	"Kaingin"	4:06
8.	"Bahala Na"	2:36
Total length:		27:59

== Personnel ==
=== Musicians ===
- alaska B – drums
- Eirene Cloma – vocals, bass, keyboard
- Michelle Cruz – vocals, agong
- Joanna Delos Reyes – vocals, gandingan, sarunay
- Kat Estacio – vocals, kulintang, dabakan, programming
- Katrina Estacio – vocals, kulintang, sarunay

=== Production and engineering ===
- alaska B – additional programming, production, mixing engineer
- Jeff "Fedge" Elliot – mastering engineer
- Kohen Hammond – additional bass engineer
- Brendan Swanson – mix engineer

=== Artwork ===
- Pauline Despi – art direction
- Joyce Tai – logo design
