= Pantayo =

- Origin: Toronto, Ontario, Canada
- Years active: 2012–present
- Members: Eirene Cloma; Michelle Cruz; Joanna Delos Reyes; Kat Estacio; Katrina Estacio
- Past members: Christine Balmes; Marianne Rellin

Pantayo is a Canadian quintet consisting of queer members of the Filipino diaspora formed in 2012. They combine elements of kulintang with elements of electronic, synth-pop, punk, and R&B music. Their name is Tagalog for "for us". The band consists of vocalist, bassist, and keyboardist Eirene Cloma; vocalist and agung player Michelle Cruz; vocalist, gandingan player, and sarunay player Joanna Delos Reyes; vocalist, kulintang and dabakan player Kat Estacio; and vocalist, kulintang player, and sarunay player Katrina Estacio. They were named as one of NOW Magazine's Toronto Indie Musicians to Watch in 2018.

== History ==
They formed in 2012 and collaborated with Yamantaka // Sonic Titan on the soundtrack to the 2016 video game Severed. Their debut album, Pantayo, was released in 2020 and was produced by Alaska B from Yamantaka // Sonic Titan. It was shortlisted for the 2020 Polaris Music Prize.

== Discography ==
- Pantayo (2020)
