= McMullen Gallery =

Art gallery in University of Alberta Hospital

General information
- Location: 8440 112 Street NW T6G 2B7, Edmonton, Canada
- Opened: 1986

McMullen Gallery is a gallery located in the University of Alberta Hospital in Edmonton, Alberta. It is operated by Friends of University Hospitals as part of their Arts in Healthcare program, intended to support the healing of patients. In the past, it has showcased works by artists like Lauren Crazybull and Bradley Necyk.

== History ==
Ideas for an art gallery in a hospital were originally envisioned in the 1970s by the McMullen Gallery's namesake, William McMullen, the vice chairman of the University of Alberta Hospital's board and chairman of the Alberta Art Foundation, who argued that art had a "positive impact on patients." It opened in 1986, seven years after McMullen passed, and was the first of its kind in Canada.

In July 2026, the art gallery celebrated its fortieth anniversary, showcasing an exhibition of work curated by donors, staff, and community members in the University Hospital Foundation's Arts in Health program.
