= Tracey Lindberg =

Canadian writer, singer, professor and activist

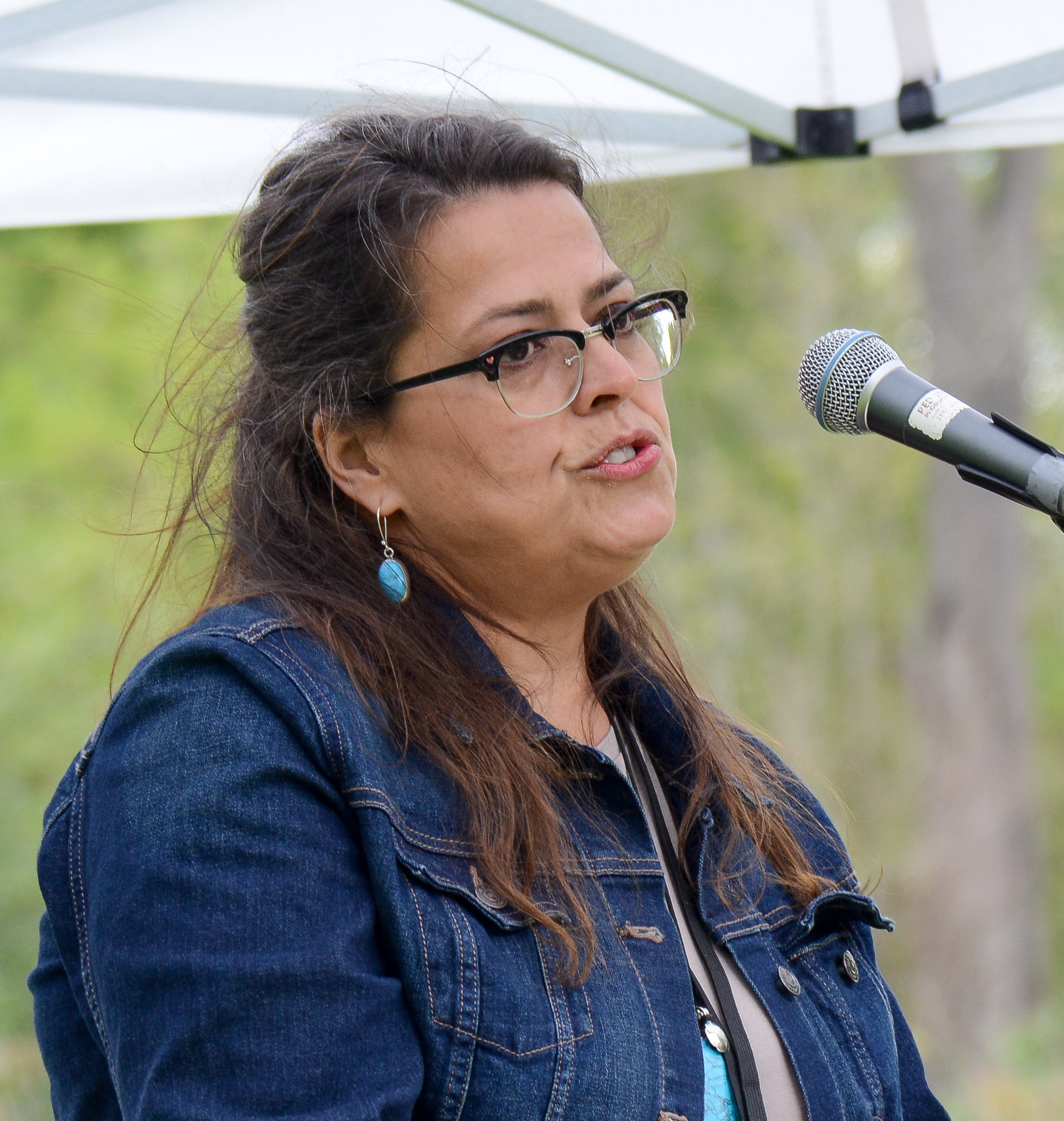
- Lindberg at the Eden Mills Writers' Festival in 2015
- Occupations: Novelist; academic; teacher
- Writing career
- Period: 2010s-present
- Notable work: Birdie
- Website: traceylindberg.ca

Tracey Lindberg is a writer, scholar, lawyer and Indigenous Rights activist from the Kelly Lake Cree Nation in British Columbia. She is Cree-Métis and a citizen of the As'in'i'wa'chi Ni'yaw Nation, Rocky Mountain Cree.

She won the Governor General's Gold Medal with her dissertation, Critical Indigenous Legal Theory, and her academic work earned her a Canada Research Chair in Indigenous Traditional Knowledge, Legal Orders and Laws. Lindberg works with elders and spiritual leaders in Indigenous communities to record and translateIndigenous law. She taught law at Athabasca University and the University of Ottawa before moving to the University of Victoria.

Her debut novel, Birdie, was published in 2015 and is a national best-seller. It presents the path of healing through the main character, Bernice Meetos, a Cree woman who is trying to reconcile with her tragic past. Reviewers have noted how Birdie demonstrates the effects of colonization and transgenerational trauma on Indigenous families and speaks to a universal story of self-discovery. The novel was selected for the 2016 edition of Canada Reads, where it was defended by entrepreneur Bruce Poon Tip. The novel was also a finalist for the Alberta Literary Award for Fiction and the Kobo Emerging Writer Prize, and was longlisted for the Dublin Literary Award.

Lindberg also performs as a blues singer.

== Education ==
Lindberg received her Bachelor of Laws from the University of Saskatchewan, Master of Laws from Harvard University, and PhD in law from the University of Ottawa. She was the first Indigenous woman in Canada to complete her graduate law degree at Harvard University. She is also the first Indigenous woman to receive a doctorate in law from a Canadian university.

== Career ==
=== Teaching ===
In 1997, Lindberg was hired to teach criminal justice at Athabasca University in Alberta. In 2001, she helped to establish its Centre for World Indigenous Knowledge and Research and became Director of Indigenous Education. In 2010 she became Athabasca's fourth Canada Research Chair. Her focus was on Indigenous Traditional Knowledge, Legal Orders and Laws. At this point she began to split her time between Athabasca University and the University of Ottawa and transferred to UOttawa full-time in 2016.

Lindberg was a professor of Indigenous law and government at the University of Ottawa. Within the Faculty of Law at UOttawa, the Common Law Section offered an Indigenous Law Program for the first time in September 2016. She also taught at the Native Law Program and has written and taught courses about Indigenous business law, Indigenous women, and dispute resolution.

Lindberg now teaches at the University of Victoria. Her areas of research include traditional Cree law, Indigenous law and literature, and Indigenous legal theory.

=== Reconciliation ===
Much of Lindberg's academic work deals with the issue of reconciliation for Indigenous communities with Canada. In 2017, Lindberg appeared at the Indigenous Writers' Gathering, which facilitates reconciliation between Indigenous and non-Indigenous people through the sharing of Indigenous literature. It was part of the IndigenousReads campaign and encompassed discussions with many Indigenous authors who shared their perspectives on overcoming adversity and building resistance.

=== Literary work ===
Lindberg's literary works demonstrate the importance of Indigenous tradition, resiliency, and narratives to empower marginalized populations. Lindberg's written work includes essays and dissertations on Indigenous governance, Indigenous feminism, and traditional Indigenous education. She received a Governor General's Academic Gold Medal in 2007. She is the co-author of the 2012 academic text Discovering Indigenous Lands: The Doctrine of Discovery in the English Colonies with Larissa Behrendt, Robert J. Miller, and Jacinta Ruru.

== Activism ==
Lindberg's social and political activism in Indigenous law, governance, education, and reconciliation, particularly with Indigenous women, got her the position as an associate professor in the Centre for World Indigenous Knowledge and Research.

In 2018, she spoke at the first Indigenous-led summit that focused on building solutions and promoting healing from the effects of the Indian Act. The summit, determiNATION: Moving Beyond the Indian Act brought together Indigenous Elders, spiritual leaders, youth, scholars, and the Minister of Crown–Indigenous Relations to speak to issues impacting Indigenous communities.

Lindberg has given presentations on the strength of survivors of abuse that also come up in her book Birdie. She advocates for the narratives of Indigenous peoples to be recognized, especially for Indigenous women and their cultural identities. Her work includes advocating on behalf of Indigenous youth, where she focuses on empowerment and teaching the importance of Indigenous language and storytelling.

Lindberg's political activism focuses on the complexities of reconciliation for Indigenous people. In 2017, Lindberg delivered a speech called (W)rec(k)-onciliation: Indigenous Lands and Peoples' Respect, Reciprocity and Relationships. It was presented at Vancouver Island University's second annual event for Pre-Confederation Treaties and Reconciliation. Her approach to reconciliation focuses on a complex process with many factors involved, rather than a linear process.

=== Indigenous women's legal advocacy ===
Lindberg advocates for Indigenous women, due to the fact that many narratives about Indigenous women have been used to impair their agency, knowledge, and present them in destructive ways. She targets this issue by writing counter-narratives to reclaim socio-cultural stories in regard to Indigenous women's history. Lindberg's legal advocacy for Indigenous women provides an anti-colonial approach to legal assistance and proper representation.

=== Missing and murdered Indigenous women ===
Lindberg has also focused on the crisis of Missing and Murdered Indigenous Women and Girls in Canada and the United States with her article, "Violence against Indigenous women and the case of Cindy Gladue", published in 2015. The article gives agency to families of the missing and murdered and addresses the systemic violence that has impacted Indigenous women.

=== Survivors of sexual violence ===
In addition to Lindberg's work with Indigenous women, she works with women of various backgrounds who have experienced sexual violence. In 2018, she facilitated a workshop at Carleton University called "Survivors' Writing Circle", which taught writing as a tool for healing and recovery for survivors of sexual violence.

== Birdie (2015) ==
Birdie, published in 2015, was Lindberg's debut novel. Birdie is enriched with elements of Cree storytelling, tradition, and language. The story is told non-linearly, with most of it taking place from Bernice Meetoos's bed in an almost-dream state, shifting between the past and present. Reviews have noted that Birdie challenges Canada's violent history in regard to the colonization of Indigenous peoples, in contrast to Canada often purporting an image of national kindness.

Lindberg presents the journey of Bernice Meetoos, a Cree-Métis woman who becomes withdrawn from the present in order to work through her traumatic past. Throughout her novel, Lindberg encourages people to be responsible for one another, opening up a dialogue about reconciliation. This novel addresses the epidemic of Missing and Murdered Indigenous Women and Girls in North America, and the economic and social inequities in Indigenous communities.

Lindberg uses Cree poetic aesthetics throughout her novel with the use of Cree traditional song, language, law, and humour. The way in which Lindberg constructs her sentences, translates Cree language, inserts politically charged words, and uses self-reflection of the main character are some of the linguistic narrative techniques that reclaim Indigenous identity in literature. Lindberg uses Plains Cree language translated into English in footnotes. She also reclaims certain racial pejoratives through re-appropriation.

Lindberg uses the relational tool of Cree law in Birdie, based on the principle that we are all bound by the universe and have a reciprocal obligation to treat one another with care, called Wahkohtowin.

Bruce Poon Tip was on the panel of the 2016 Canada Reads competition and defended Birdie. He lauded Birdie as a piece of work that encompasses Indigenous resistance to colonization. His project to introduce the novel into high schools launched 10,000 copies into schools across the country.

== Awards and recognition ==
Birdie was 45th on a list of the 100 best books of the year by the National Post in 2015. It was also a finalist for Canada Reads in 2016. Birdie was a national bestseller, a finalist for an Alberta Literary Award and a Kobo Emerging Writer Prize, and a longlisted selection of the Dublin Literary Award. Lindberg was also named a CBC "writer to watch".

Lindberg received the Governor General's Gold Academic Medal in 2007 upon convocation for her dissertation in Critical Indigenous Legal Theory. Lindberg's academic work also earned her a Canada Research Chair in Indigenous Traditional Knowledge, Legal Orders and Laws.

In 2018, Lindberg was named a Fellow of the Royal Society of Canada.

The Cree Word for Love: Sâkihitowin, co-written with George Littlechild, was shortlisted for the Jim Deva Prize for Writing that Provokes and the Danuta Gleed Literary Award in 2026.

== Presentations ==
- cultuRED Talks: Anniversary Edition with Tracey Lindberg (2016): Lindberg shares the art of Indigenous storytelling with her audience, as well as tools for renewal and survival.
- Strength of Survivors (2018): Lindberg speaks to some of the themes that come up in her novel Birdie and asks her audiences to become more involved in Indigenous narratives. She makes many connections to women of all different backgrounds who share similar experiences of abuse.
- Don't Take No for an Answer (2018): A youth-centered presentation in which Lindberg shares her personal story of her career. She focuses on youth empowerment, doing what brings you joy, and the importance of goal-setting.
- Relationships & Reconciliation (2018): Lindberg talks about boundary-setting to maintain healthy relationships and how this impacts our understanding of responsibility, territoriality, and reconciliation.

== Selected works ==
- Critical Indigenous Legal Theory. University of Ottawa. 2007. doi:10.20381/ruor-19768
- Discovering Indigenous Lands: The Doctrine of Discovery in the English Colonies. Co-authored with Robert J. Miller, Jacinta Ruru, and Larissa Behrendt. Oxford University Press. 2010. ISBN 978-0-19-957981-5
- Daniel David Moses: Spoken and Written Explorations of His Work. Co-edited with David Brundage. Guernica Editions. 2015. ISBN 978-1-55071-948-2
- Birdie. HarperCollins. 2016. ISBN 9781554682942
- The Cree Word for Love: Sâkihitowin. Art by George Littlechild. HarperCollins. 2025. ISBN 978-1-4434-6779-7
