= Laughter in Summer =

Studio album by Beverly Glenn-Copeland
- Released: February 6, 2026
- Recorded: 2024
- Studios: Hotel2Tango, Montreal, Quebec
- Genre: Experimental
- Length: 36:51
- Label: Transgressive
- Producers: Beverly Glenn-Copeland, Elizabeth Copeland, Alex Samaras, Howard Bilerman

Beverly Glenn-Copeland chronology
The Ones Ahead (2023)	Laughter in Summer (2026)

Laughter in Summer is a studio album by the American-born Canadian singer-songwriter Beverly Glenn-Copeland. Although billed solely to Glenn-Copeland, it was made as a collaboration with his wife, the writer and theatre artist Elizabeth Glenn-Copeland, and both perform and co-produce. Transgressive Records released the album on February 6, 2026.

The recordings arose from a 2024 rehearsal at Montreal's Hotel2Tango studio, where the couple performed with the pianist and music director Alex Samaras, multi-instrumentalist Naomi McCarroll-Butler, and a nine-person choir. Recorded largely as single takes, the album uses voices, piano, clarinet, and whistles in place of the synthesizer-based arrangements associated with some of Glenn-Copeland's earlier work. Its nine tracks combine new material with live reinterpretations of songs from Keyboard Fantasies (1986) and The Ones Ahead (2023).

Laughter in Summer received generally positive reviews. Critics praised the performances' intimacy, the interaction between the couple and the choir, and the treatment of love, memory, and community, although some questioned how much of the album's impact depended on the circumstances surrounding it. At Metacritic, it received a score of 83 out of 100 based on twelve reviews. Laughter in Summer was shortlisted for the 2026 Polaris Music Prize.

== Background and development ==
Laughter in Summer followed Beverly Glenn-Copeland's 2023 album The Ones Ahead. Beverly and Elizabeth began working together on concerts and theatre projects before becoming partners in 2007. From 2010 to 2016, they ran KPH Theatre Productions on the Acadian coast of New Brunswick, where they developed intergenerational performance pieces that later supplied material for the album. Elizabeth also managed and produced Beverly's music during the renewed attention to his work. She described the album as a return to their earlier practice as joint creators after that attention had often sent their work in separate directions.

Beverly disclosed in 2024 that he had been diagnosed with dementia. Discussing Laughter in Summer, Elizabeth said that the diagnosis changed their approach to performance but that they wanted the record to emphasize presence and connection rather than illness.

== Recording and production ==
In 2024, Hotel2Tango co-owner Howard Bilerman offered the Glenn-Copelands time at the Montreal studio. The couple intended to rehearse and make an archival recording of their concert arrangements before an appearance at Pop Montréal, rather than to begin an album. Alex Samaras, their music director, had prepared vocal arrangements and assembled a choir of Montreal singers. Most members of the ensemble met the couple on the day of the session, and there was no full rehearsal before recording began.

The group played together live on the studio floor. Elizabeth recalled that each piece was attempted once; the choir considered its performance of "Ever New" a rehearsal until Beverly moved on to the next number. The label's account describes one of the "Let Us Dance" movements as a setup rehearsal and the other pieces as single takes, with no second performances used. After listening to the recordings, the musicians concluded that the session could form an album. A few vocal harmonies were adjusted, but Elizabeth said that otherwise the performances were left as captured. The resulting arrangements centre on the couple's voices, Samaras's piano, Naomi McCarroll-Butler's clarinet and whistles, and the choir.

Beverly, Elizabeth, Samaras, and Bilerman share production credit. Bilerman also engineered and mixed the album; Shae Brossard assisted with engineering, and Harris Newman mastered it.

== Composition ==
=== Music and themes ===
Laughter in Summer is built around spare acoustic arrangements and alternates between duets, solo passages, and ensemble singing. Ted Davis of Bandcamp Daily described its palette as earthy and hymnal, while Matthew Blackwell of Pitchfork found that the choir turned Beverly's familiar melodies into communal songs. On the two reworkings from Keyboard Fantasies (1986), the earlier synthesizer settings give way to piano, woodwind, and voices. Across the album, repeated lines and simple melodic figures give the songs what several reviewers characterized as the quality of hymns or nursery songs.

The songs address romantic partnership, childhood, ageing, and collective care. Blackwell interpreted the movement between individual and choral voices as an expansion of the couple's private memories into a wider idea of community. Davis similarly heard grief and remembrance alongside romance, rather than treating the record solely as a response to Beverly's diagnosis. Elizabeth characterized hope and love on the album as active commitments expressed through making music with other people.

=== Songs ===
The album begins and ends with two arrangements of "Let Us Dance", which Beverly first released on Keyboard Fantasies. "Movement One" establishes the piano-and-choir arrangement; "Movement Two" is looser and includes spontaneous vocal exchanges from the studio. "Ever New", also from Keyboard Fantasies, is performed with piano, clarinet, and choir in place of its original electronic arrangement. The choir believed that the released take was merely a run-through.

The title track began as part of Beverly's series of instrumental pieces called "Songs with No Words". Elizabeth added lyrics, her first songwriting credit on one of his albums, and sings them against Beverly's wordless melody and the choir. "Children's Anthem" was written in 2007 for a teachers' workshop on bullying and rearranged for the Hotel2Tango ensemble.

"Harbour", a birthday gift from Beverly to Elizabeth, had appeared on The Ones Ahead (2023) as a duet with Jeremy Costello. For Laughter in Summer, Beverly performs it as a duet with Elizabeth. "Middle Island Lament" originated in a musical that the couple made with children at their theatre school in Miramichi, New Brunswick. The album also includes the traditional American folk song "Shenandoah", which Beverly associated with his childhood and his mother's singing. "Prince Caspian's Dream at Hotel2Tango", another piece previously released on The Ones Ahead, was composed in stages over several decades.

== Release and promotion ==
Transgressive Records announced Laughter in Summer on October 7, 2025, when "Let Us Dance (Movement One)" and "Children's Anthem" were issued as its first two previews. The title track followed as a single on November 19, 2025, accompanied by a video of a performance at London's Hackney Empire. A new version of "Harbour" was issued on January 14, 2026, with another video from the same October 2025 concert.

The label released the nine-track album on vinyl, compact disc, and digital formats on February 6, 2026.

On July 9, Laughter in Summer was named one of ten albums on the shortlist for the 2026 Polaris Music Prize, which recognizes Canadian albums without regard to genre or sales. The winner is scheduled to be announced on September 22, 2026.

== Critical reception ==
Professional ratings
Aggregate scores
Source	Rating
Metacritic	83/100
Review scores
Source	Rating
The Line of Best Fit	8/10
MusicOMH	4.5/5 stars
No Ripcord	7/10
Pitchfork	8.0/10
The Skinny	4/5 stars
Uncut	8/10
Under the Radar	7/10

At Metacritic, which normalizes reviews from selected publications to a score out of 100, Laughter in Summer received a weighted average of 83 based on twelve reviews, indicating "universal acclaim". Reviewers broadly agreed that the unembellished recording method gave the performances unusual immediacy and renewed the older songs.

Matthew Blackwell of Pitchfork heard spontaneity within the ensemble's careful control, while John Murphy of MusicOMH emphasized the contrast between the couple's voices and the choir. Daniel Herborn of the Saturday Paper wrote that the single takes and choral setting rejuvenated the earlier material, and Ted Davis of Bandcamp Daily found that the restrained setting allowed joy and grief to coexist. John Bradbury of the 13th Floor similarly emphasized the intimate interaction of voices, piano, and clarinet, and Andrew Neal of Silent Radio found that the one-take method gave the economical performances spontaneity.

The album's acoustic scale led critics to describe it as depicting loss without turning into an elegy. A. D. Amorosi of Flood Magazine characterized the piano-led music as pastoral and elegiac but enlivened by joy and theatricality. Frank Sawatzki of Musikexpress likewise heard Beverly Glenn-Copeland's voice as both gentle and forceful, making his quiet songs a declaration of togetherness. Steve Erickson of Gay City News wrote that the austere production collapsed the distance between the performers and listener and magnified Glenn-Copeland's voice.

The participation of Elizabeth Glenn-Copeland and the choir was also central to the positive assessments. Blackwell argued that the duets made the couple's relationship part of the album's form and that the gathered voices extended private memory into community. In Uncut, Jason Anderson likewise treated Elizabeth as a creative agent and found that the choir allowed the musicians to encounter familiar songs afresh. Writing in the New York Review of Books, Bijan Stephen described Elizabeth's newly audible role as a major source of the album's power and interpreted the career-spanning selection as Beverly's most direct treatment of passing time. David Harris of Spin heard the recording itself as a way for the couple to preserve memories, while Sebas E. Alonso of Jenesaispop found that the piano, chamber arrangements, and exchanged vocals made the varied material cohere as an effective duo album.

Some critics thought that prior knowledge of Beverly's life supplied part of the record's emotional force. David Coleman of No Ripcord praised "Ever New" and the first movement of "Let Us Dance", but considered "Children's Anthem" and "Harbour" less musically textured than his strongest earlier work. Callum McLean of Under the Radar likewise found the acoustic settings modest when separated from the circumstances of their recording, while commending his voice and the performances' tenderness. Janne Oinonen of the Line of Best Fit called the opening three tracks the album's high point and felt that the remainder was a gradual comedown, though he praised the warmth and sincerity throughout.

=== Accolades ===
Accolades for Laughter in Summer
Year	Organization	Category	Result	Ref.
2026	Polaris Music Prize	Album of the Year	Shortlisted	

== Track listing ==
Laughter in Summer track listing
No.	Title	Writer(s)	Length
1.	"Let Us Dance (Movement One)"	Beverly Glenn-Copeland	4:19
2.	"Ever New – At Hotel2Tango"	Beverly Glenn-Copeland	4:01
3.	"Laughter in Summer"	Beverly Glenn-Copeland, Elizabeth Copeland	5:06
4.	"Children's Anthem"	Beverly Glenn-Copeland	3:35
5.	"Harbour"	Beverly Glenn-Copeland	4:32
6.	"Middle Island Lament"	Beverly Glenn-Copeland	3:51
7.	"Shenandoah"	Traditional	2:33
8.	"Prince Caspian's Dream at Hotel2Tango"	Beverly Glenn-Copeland	4:03
9.	"Let Us Dance (Movement Two)"	Beverly Glenn-Copeland	4:51
Total length:			36:51

== Personnel ==
Credits are adapted from Bandcamp and AllMusic.

Musicians

- Beverly Glenn-Copeland – vocals
- Elizabeth Copeland – vocals
- Alex Samaras – vocals, piano
- Naomi McCarroll-Butler – clarinet, whistles, choir
- Helena Deland – choir
- Camille Deléan – choir
- Eugénie Jobin – choir
- Robin Love – choir
- Mara Nesrallah – choir
- Frédérique Roy – choir
- Alanna Stuart – choir
- Adèle Trottier-Rivard – choir

Production

- Beverly Glenn-Copeland – production
- Elizabeth Copeland – production
- Alex Samaras – production
- Howard Bilerman – production, engineering, mixing
- Shae Brossard – engineering
- Harris Newman – mastering

Artwork

- Wade Muir – photography
- Andrea Smith-Meecham – design
