= Freak Heat Waves =

Canadian music group formed in 2009

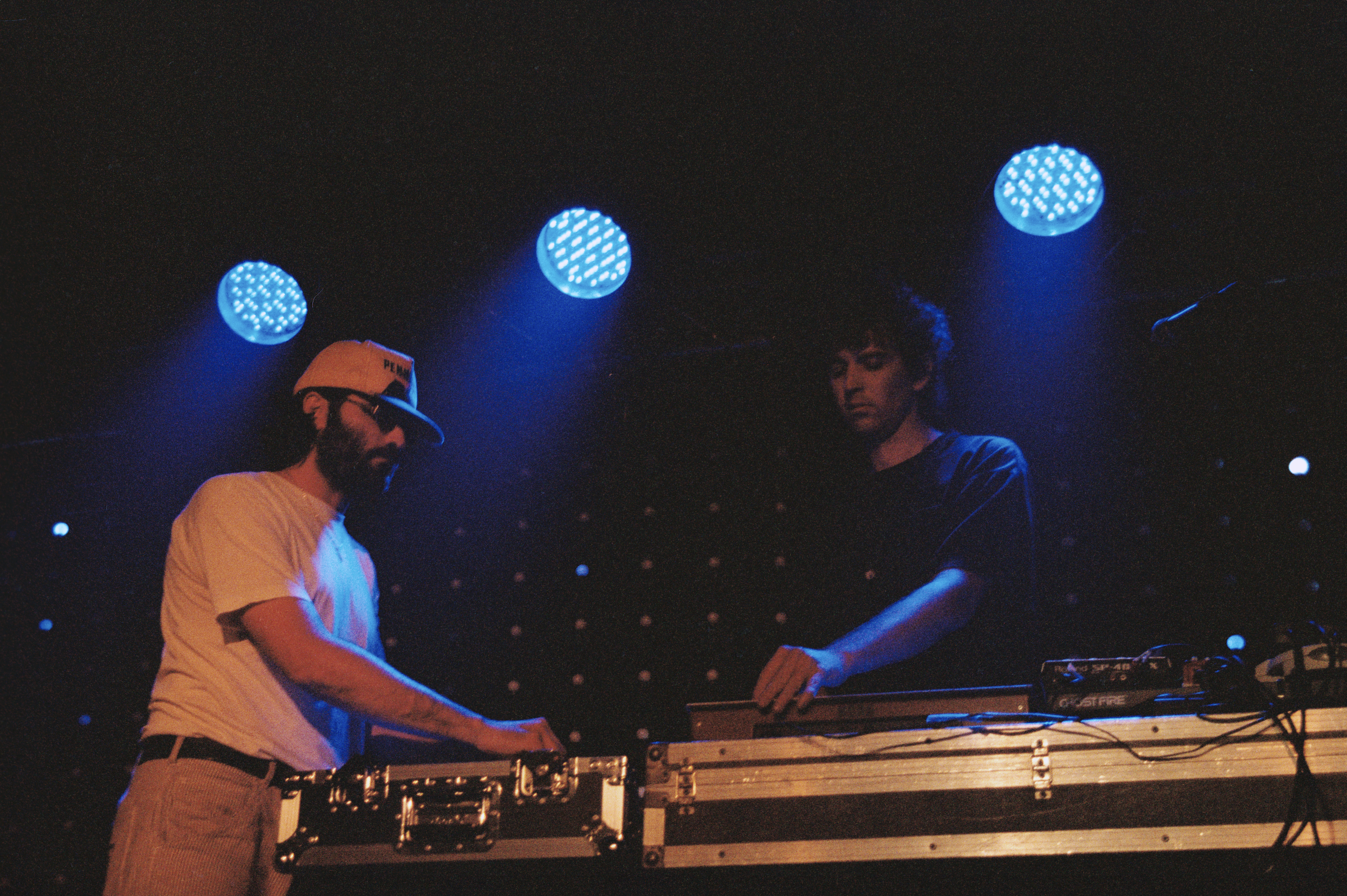
- Freak Heat Waves performing at Lucky Bar (Victoria, British Columbia) in July 2023 on their tour with Cindy Lee.

Background information
- Origin: Medicine Hat, Alberta, Canada
- Genres: Electronic, ambient, synth-pop, dub, house, psychedelic, post-punk
- Years active: 2009–present
- Members: Thomas Di Ninno; Steven Lind

Freak Heat Waves is a Canadian music group (formed in 2009), currently consisting of Thomas Di Ninno and Steven Lind. Having garnered their reputation in Canada's underground music scene, they originated from Medicine Hat, Alberta, and are now based across Montreal, Quebec and Victoria, British Columbia. Their music has been described as eclectic, meditative and introspective, traversing electronic, ambient, dub, house, synth-pop, psychedelic and post-punk genres.

== Collaborations ==
Freak Heat Waves has collaborated with several musicians, including Cindy Lee on their 2023 single "In a Moment Divine", which was featured in Hermès' Men's Summer 2026 runway show at Palais d'Iéna, in Paris. Band member Steven Lind is also known for his work with Cindy Lee on the 2024 Polaris Music Prize shortlisted album Diamond Jubilee, co-writing the song "Baby Blue" as well as producing, mixing and performing instrumentation on several tracks across the record.

== Discography ==
=== Albums ===
- Mondo Tempo (Mood Hut, 2023)
- Zap the Planet (Telephone Explosion Records, 2020)
- Beyond XXXL (Telephone Explosion Records, 2018)
- Bonnie's State of Mind (Hockey Dad Records, 2015)
- Freak Heat Waves (Self-released debut, 2012)

=== Singles and EPs ===
- What It Feels Like (with Grand Eugène) (2025)
- Bottomed Out (with New Orthodox) (Joyful Noise Recordings, 2024)
- In a Moment Divine (with Cindy Lee) (Mood Hut, 2023)
- Birth of Venus (Mother Image Records, 2014)
- Mission Bay (Fan Club Music Club, 2010)
