= The Ones Ahead =

Studio album by Beverly Glenn-Copeland
- Released: July 28, 2023
- Studios: Lakewind, Canada
- Length: 42:10
- Label: Transgressive
- Producer: John Herberman

Beverly Glenn-Copeland chronology
Transmissions (2020)	The Ones Ahead (2023)	Laughter in Summer (2026)

The Ones Ahead is the fourth studio album by Canadian-American singer-songwriter Beverly Glenn-Copeland, released on July 28, 2023, through Transgressive Records. The album marks his first album of new music since 2004's Primal Prayer, released under the name Phynix, and the first under his real name since when he came out as a transgender man. It received positive reviews from music critics.

== Background ==
Glenn-Copeland wrote "Harbour" for his wife Elizabeth Paddon, while "Stand Anthem" was inspired by a play written by his wife titled Bearing Witness. "Africa Calling" was inspired by West African drumming and conversations Glenn-Copeland has had with "members of the African diaspora" about the "need to explore and express our heritage".

== Critical reception ==
Professional ratings
Aggregate scores
Source	Rating
Metacritic	81/100
Review scores
Source	Rating
Pitchfork	8.0/10
The Skinny	4/5 stars

The Ones Ahead received a score of 81 out of 100 on review aggregator Metacritic based on six critics' reviews, indicating "universal acclaim". Uncut stated that "throughout all nine songs, Glenn-Copeland's voice seems to exist on the eternal plane, powerful and vulnerable in equal measure, an elder sharing his knowledge in stirring sonic form", while The Wire noted that "the album's stylistic breadth and the cinematic sweep of its production add up to a more polished version of the anthemic, collaborative sound cultivated on the tour, heard on his 2020 Live at Le Guess Who? 2018 album". Mojo described that its elements of "warbling soul, classical lieder, No Other's stage-musical rapture, the title track's echo of Copeland's 1986 New-Age-synth album Keyboard Fantasies [are] all united by his seemingly unshakeable belief in humanity".

The Skinny's Marco Marcelline found there to be "just so many stand-outs here" and remarked that the album "carries a resolute message of hope for the world, backed up by Glenn-Copeland's evident wisdom". Reviewing the album for Pitchfork, Jesse Dorris called The Ones Ahead "a joyous, hope-filled showcase of his singular voice and healing vision", as well as "a remarkably assured statement of purpose" and "a staging ground for his vision and his voice".

The album was a longlisted nominee for the 2024 Polaris Music Prize.

== Track listing ==
All tracks are written by Beverly Glenn-Copeland.

The Ones Ahead track listing
No.	Title	Length
1.	"Africa Calling"	5:40
2.	"Harbour (Song for Elizabeth)"	4:38
3.	"Love Takes All"	4:39
4.	"People of the Loon"	4:56
5.	"Stand Anthem"	5:58
6.	"The Ones Ahead"	4:56
7.	"Prince Caspian's Dream"	4:10
8.	"Lakeland Angel"	3:04
9.	"No Other"	4:09
Total length:		42:10

== Personnel ==
Credits adapted from Tidal.

- Beverly Glenn-Copeland – vocals
- John Herberman – production, mixing, music direction, arrangements
- Carlie Howell – arrangements
- Jeremy Darby – engineering
- Julian Decorte – engineering
- Mike Shepherd – engineering
- Guy Davie – mastering
- Brianna Blank – art direction, photography
- Traianos Pakioufakis – graphic design
- Ellen Kirk – project management
