= Cindy Lee (band) =

Canadian band

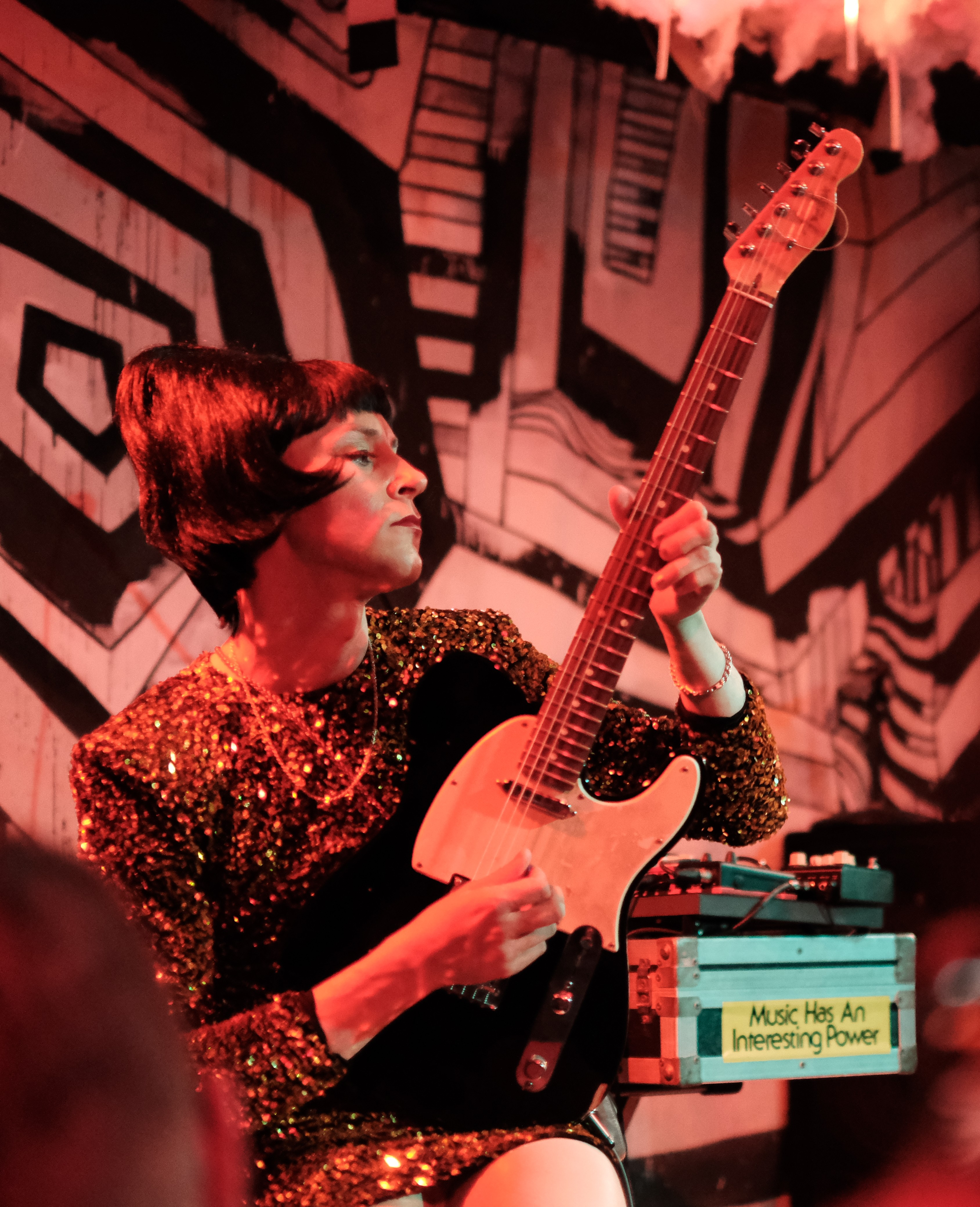
- Cindy Lee at the Cactus Club in Milwaukee, Wisconsin, USA on 3 May 2024

Background information
- Origin: Calgary, Alberta, Canada
- Genres: Pop, rock, hypnagogic pop, doo-wop, noise pop, brill building, no wave, noise
- Years active: 2012–present
- Members: Patrick Flegel
- Past members: Morgan Cook

Cindy Lee is the performance and songwriting project of Canadian musician Patrick Flegel, former guitarist and lead singer of Women.

Cindy Lee is most noted for their 2020 album What's Tonight to Eternity?, which was longlisted for the 2020 Polaris Music Prize, and for 2024's critically acclaimed triple album Diamond Jubilee, which was shortlisted for the 2024 Polaris Music Prize.

== Background ==
Following the breakup of Women in 2010, Flegel collaborated with Morgan Cook in the band Androgynous Mind, releasing the EP Nightstalker in 2012. From there, the project evolved into Cindy Lee, which sees Flegel recording music primarily alone but continuing to perform with a rotating roster of supporting musicians.

For Cindy Lee, Flegel performs cross-dressed. When asked in a fan Q&A on web forum Reddit to elaborate on whether Cindy Lee is a character, a figure of her own, or something else, Flegel replied as follows:

[...] combining 'cross dressing' with live performance, over time [...] became a way to reinforce me doing something that I love doing that I often withhold from myself. I have been perplexed by the novelty in peoples eyes of what I see as a very basic and very traditional performance on my part.

Though earlier press pieces on Cindy Lee used they/them pronouns, a 2024 article written by a personal friend uses he/him pronouns when referring to Flegel throughout.

== Releases ==
The demo cassette Tatlashea was released by Canadian label Isolated Now Waves on Boxing Day 2012. In 2015 Flegel self-released (via their CCQSK label) the full-length albums Act of Tenderness and Malenkost, both of which were later reissued and received wider distribution in the US and Europe. The compilation cassette Model Express was released by CCQSK in 2018 and pressed to vinyl by W.25th in 2020.

What's Tonight to Eternity? was released in February 2020. Its lead single, "Heavy Metal", was a posthumous tribute to Flegel's former Women bandmate Chris Reimer. Cat O' Nine Tails followed in March 2020.

In 2024, Cindy Lee released the double album Diamond Jubilee. It received widespread critical acclaim, including the highest score given out by Pitchfork in four years. A tour in support of the album began on April 6, but was canceled on May 4 as the project was set to play Chicago.

Initially, the album was released digitally only, via two official channels: Flegel's own Realistik Studios website – listeners were invited to send payment for a digital copy of the album – and their YouTube channel, via which the album can be streamed in full for free, without ads. The album was a shortlisted finalist for the 2024 Polaris Music Prize.

In October 2024, it was announced that the album is to be released on CD and vinyl by Superior Viaduct’s W.25th imprint, in February 2025.

== Collaborations ==
Flegel collaborated with Freak Heat Waves on their 2023 single "In a Moment Divine". Flegel also performed as a live member of Freak Heat Waves in 2015 as well as during their 2023/2024 co-headlining North American tours. Steven Lind from Freak Heat Waves also collaborated with Flegel on Diamond Jubilee, co-writing "Baby Blue" as well as performing production and mixing duties on the record and contributing various instrumentation throughout the record.

In 2024, Flegel collaborated with Deerhunter drummer Moses Archuleta on his second studio album, Cemetery Classics, released under the moniker Moon Diagrams, and with Animal Collective's Noah Lennox on the Panda Bear single "Defense".

== Discography ==
=== Albums ===
- Tatlashea (Isolated Now Waves, 2012; reissued 2016)
- Act of Tenderness (CCQSK, 2015; Maple Death, 2018; W.25th, 2018)
- Malenkost (Isolated Now Waves, 2015; Maple Death, 2018; W.25th, 2018)
- Model Express (CCQSK, 2018; W.25th, 2020)
- What's Tonight to Eternity? (W.25th, 2020)
- Cat o' Nine Tails (Realistik, 2020; Isolated Now Waves, 2023)
- Diamond Jubilee (Realistik, 2024)

=== Singles ===
- Holding the Devil’s Hand (split single with Red Mass) (Mongrel Zine, 2013)
- A Message From the Aching Sky (digital single) (CCQSK, 2016)
- In a Moment Divine (with Freak Heat Waves)(Mood Hut, 2023)
