= Zen Bamboo =

Canadian indie rock band

Zen Bamboo is a Canadian indie rock band from Saint-Lambert, Quebec, consisting of singer Simon Larose, guitarist Léo Leblanc, bassist Xavier Touikan and drummer Charles-Antoine Olivier. They are most noted for their 2020 album Glu, which was longlisted for the 2020 Polaris Music Prize.

The band was formed in 2017, while the members were students at Collège Durocher Saint-Lambert. Glu, which was produced by Julien Mineau of Malajube, was the band's full-length debut album following a number of EPs and standalone tracks.
