= Super Duty Tough Work =

Super Duty Tough Work are a Canadian art-rap/hip hop group from Winnipeg, Manitoba. Their debut release in 2019 with EP Studies in Grey, was longlisted for the 2020 Polaris Music Prize, making them the first hip hop act from Manitoba to be nominated for the Polaris prize.

The project is led by Brendan Grey, fronting an rotating lineup of musicians of both local and international musicians whose music uses live instruments to emulate the production style of hip hop production tools, such as the MPC2000 or Roland SP404.

In addition to their Polaris Prize nomination, the band were nominated for Best Rap/Hip Hop Group at the Western Canadian Music Awards in 2020.

Their first full length release, Paradigm Shift, was a longlisted nominee for the 2024 Polaris Music Prize. Shortly thereafter they won a Western Canadian Music Award for Best Rap and Hip Hop Artist in 2024.
