= Nêhiyawak (band) =

Canadian indie-rock group

nêhiyawak
- Origin: Edmonton, Alberta, Canada
- Genres: Dream pop, shoegaze, First Nations music
- Labels: Arts & Crafts Records
- Members: Kris Harper; Matthew Cardinal; Marek Tyler

nêhiyawak are a Canadian First Nations indie rock group from Edmonton, Alberta. The band's name is derived from Nêhiyawak, an endonym for the Cree people. The band consists of singer and guitarist Kris Harper, bassist Matthew Cardinal, and drummer Marek Tyler, all members of the Cree nation. Their style combines dream pop with shoegaze, with lyrics sung in both English and Plains Cree.

== History ==
nêhiyawak came together to compose and perform the film score for ôtênaw, a documentary by Conor McNally about Cree educator Dwayne Donald. They later released a self-titled independent three-song EP in 2017. They subsequently signed with Arts & Crafts Productions, which released the EP Starlight in 2018 and nipiy in 2019.

The band's debut album nipiy, released in 2019, was a Juno Award nominee for Indigenous Music Album of the Year at the Juno Awards of 2020, and was shortlisted for the 2020 Polaris Music Prize.
