= Beverly Glenn-Copeland =

American singer and songwriter (born 1944)

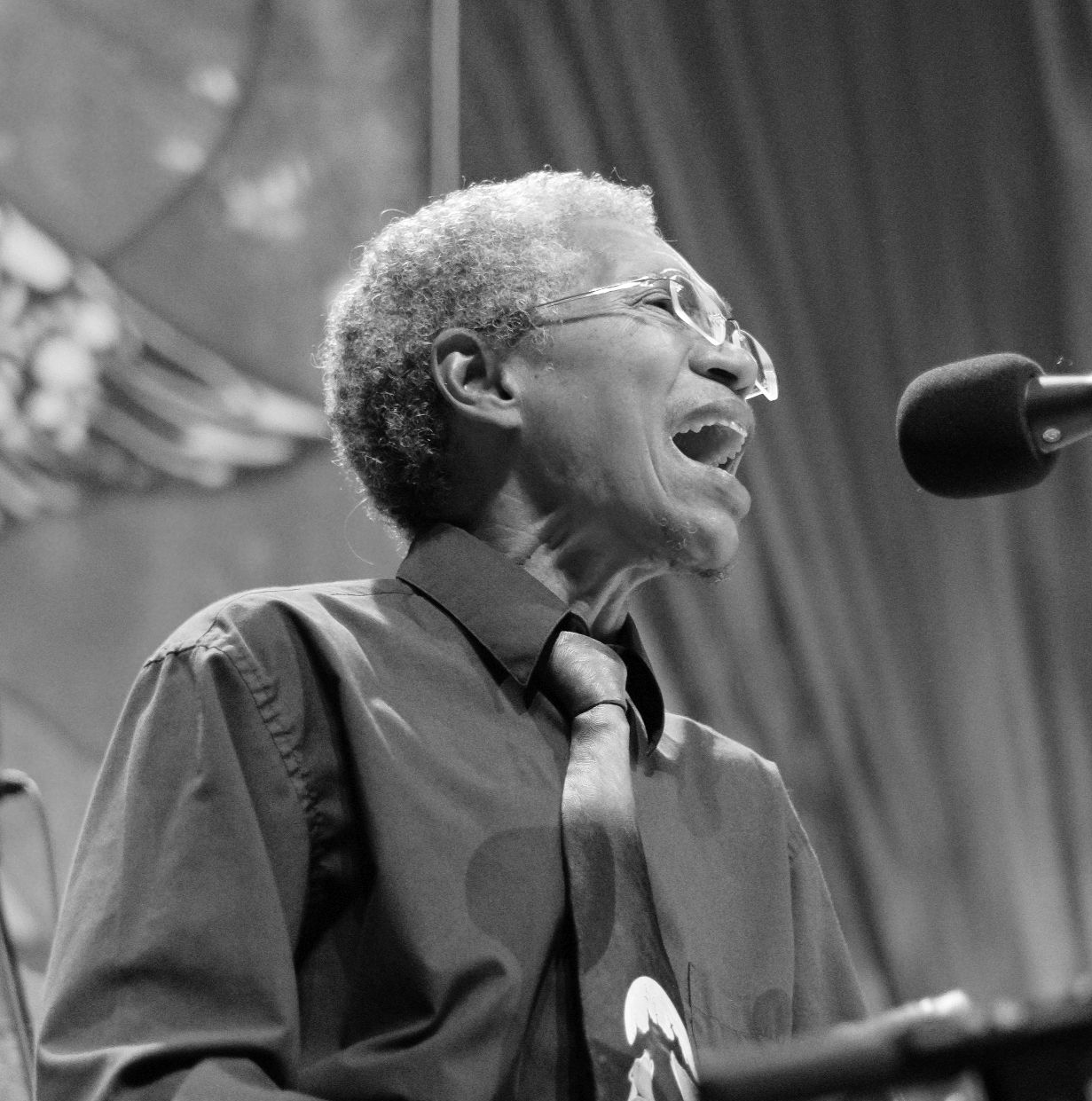
- Glenn-Copeland in 2018

Background information
- Born: Beverly Anne Glenn; January 13, 1944 (age 82); Philadelphia, Pennsylvania, U.S.
- Genres: Ambient; art pop; folk; new-age; singer-songwriter
- Occupations: Songwriter, musician, actor
- Instruments: Guitar, piano, synthesizer
- Years active: 1970–present
- Labels: CBC, GRT, Atlast, ORG, Transgressive
- Spouse: Elizabeth Glenn-Copeland (m. 2009)
- Website: beverlyglenncopeland.com and www.songcycles.com

Beverly Glenn-Copeland (born Beverly Anne Glenn, January 13, 1944) is an American-born Canadian musician, singer-songwriter and actor. He is best known for albums such as his self-titled 1971 record, Keyboard Fantasies (1986), and The Ones Ahead (2023). He contributed to the Romy Madley Croft album Mid Air (2023) and the Transa project in his career resurgence in the 2020s. His most recent studio album, Laughter in Summer (2026), was released on February 6, 2026 as Glenn was dealing with a dementia diagnosis. Glenn began publicly identifying as a trans man in 2002.

== Early life ==
Beverly Glenn-Copeland was born in Philadelphia, Pennsylvania on January 13, 1944 to a musical Quaker family. His mother was originally from Georgia. He was raised at Greenbelt Knoll whilst his father studied as a professor of artistic anthropology and aesthetics. As a child, Glenn listened to his father play the music of Bach, Chopin, and Mozart on the piano, and heard his mother occasionally sing spirituals.

In 1961, Glenn relocated to Montreal at the age of 16 to study at McGill University's classical music studies program, historically becoming one of the university's first black students. He predominantly studied classical singing and vocal training, as well as minor studies in lied and oboe. He did not finish his degree, and retired from McGill; he later retreated to New York to study in operatic singing.

== Musical career ==
Glenn started his career as a folk singer incorporating jazz, classical, and blues elements. He also performed on albums by Ken Friesen, Bruce Cockburn, Gene Murtynec, Bob DiSalle, and Kathryn Moses, and was a writer on Sesame Street. He spent twenty-five years entertaining children as a regular actor on Canadian children's television show Mr. Dressup.

Glenn's 1986 electronic album Keyboard Fantasies, recorded using equipment including a Yamaha DX7 and a Roland TR-707, and other recordings were rediscovered and promoted by Japanese record collector Ryota Masuko in 2015. After Glenn's gender transition was made public, Keyboard Fantasies was selected as one of the 70 greatest recordings by women by The Stranger. The album was named as the public vote winner of the Polaris Heritage Prize at the 2020 Polaris Music Prize. Keyboard Fantasies was remastered and reissued in February 2017 as Copeland Keyboard Fantasies by Invisible City Editions and re-released again on vinyl that same year on Séance Centre. Other albums by Glenn include Beverly Copeland (1970), Beverly Glenn-Copeland (1971), At Last! (1980), Primal Prayer (released under the pseudonym Phynix in 2004), and the career-spanning compilation Transmissions (2020).

Keyboard Fantasies: The Beverly Glenn-Copeland Story, a documentary directed by Posy Dixon, was released in 2019. Planned 2020 international tours to Australia, the United Kingdom, and other European destinations were rescheduled to 2021 due to the COVID-19 pandemic. A fundraising campaign was initiated to help Glenn and his wife after the loss of their house that resulted from these changes; the campaign raised over $90,000. In the same year, Glenn created a prerecorded video performance of his song "Courage" for Buddies in Bad Times and CBC Gem's online Queer Pride Inside show.

His 2023 album The Ones Ahead was a longlisted nominee for the 2024 Polaris Music Prize. In 2024 Glenn was awarded an honorary doctorate from University of Toronto, and won the Joyce Warshow Lifetime Achievement Award from SAGE, an organization that focuses on advocacy and services for LGBTQ+ elders.

In 2025, Glenn and his wife Elizabeth Glenn-Copeland recorded a new album, Laughter in Summer, which was released in February 2026. The album was shortlisted for the 2026 Polaris Music Prize.

== Personal life ==
In 1973, while in Los Angeles, Glenn-Copeland fell in love with the chanting at a local Soka Gakkai International meeting and has been a practicing Buddhist since the mid-1970s. Glenn-Copeland is married to Elizabeth Copeland, who he met in 1992 and has collaborated with in education, arts, and activism. The two live in Hamilton, Ontario, but previously resided in Tantramar, New Brunswick for a number of years. In September 2024, Glenn-Copeland shared that he has been diagnosed with dementia.

== Discography ==
=== Studio albums ===
- Beverly Copeland (CBC Radio Canada, 1970)
- Beverly Glenn-Copeland (GRT Records, 1971)
- At Last! (Atlast, 1980)
- Keyboard Fantasies (Atlast, 1986)
  - Copeland Keyboard Fantasies (Invisible City, 2017) – remastered and reissued edition
  - Copeland Keyboard Fantasies (Séance Centre, 2017) – on vinyl
- Primal Prayer (Org Music, 2004) – released under the pseudonym Phynix
- The Ones Ahead (Transgressive, 2023)
- Laughter in Summer (Transgressive, 2026) – collaborative album with Elizabeth Copeland

=== Other albums ===
- Live at Le Guess Who? (Transgressive, 2020)
- Transmissions: The Music of Beverly Glenn-Copeland (compilation, Transgressive, 2020)
- Keyboard Fantasies Reimagined (Transgressive, 2021) – Keyboard Fantasies tracks remixed/reworked by Bon Iver and Flock Of Dimes, and by Joseph Shabason and Thom Gill; remixed by Julia Holter, Arca, Ana Roxanne, Kelsey Lu, and Blood Orange; and performed by Jeremy Dutcher
- Transa a collection curated by Red Hot Org featured a Glenn Copeland collaboration with Sam Smith on a new version of ‘Ever New’ and a collaboration between Glenn and Devendra Banhart called "You Don't Know Me."

== Films ==
- Keyboard Fantasies: The Beverly Glenn-Copeland Story (2019) – documentary directed by Posy Dixon
- See You Tomorrow (forthcoming 2025) - documentary by Samantha Curley and Chase Joynt
