= Keyboard Fantasies: The Beverly Glenn-Copeland Story =

2019 British film

- Directed by: Posy Dixon
- Produced by: Liv Proctor
- Cinematography: Lee Burnett; Kevin A. Fraser; Morgan Spencer
- Music by: Beverly Glenn-Copeland
- Release date: 2 November 2019 (Doc 'n Roll Film Festival)
- Running time: 71 minutes
- Country: United Kingdom
- Language: English

Keyboard Fantasies: The Beverly Glenn-Copeland Story is a 2019 British documentary film about Beverly Glenn-Copeland that was directed by Posy Dixon. The film "details the Black trans musician's rise to fame" over the previous few years. It includes talking heads interviews with Copeland and his collaborators, documentary footage and live performances.

== See also ==
- Keyboard Fantasies
