= What's Tonight to Eternity? =

What's Tonight to Eternity

Studio album by Cindy Lee
- Released: 14 February 2020
- Studio: Realistik (Montreal)
- Genres: Hypnagogic pop; avant-pop; dream pop; doo wop; lo-fi; noise
- Length: 42:04
- Label: W.25th

Cindy Lee chronology
Model Express (2018)	What's Tonight to Eternity (2020)	Cat o' Nine Tails (2020)

Singles from What's Tonight to Eternity
- 1. "Heavy Metal" Released: 9 December 2019; 2. "I Want You to Suffer" Released: 20 January 2020

What's Tonight to Eternity? is the fifth studio album from Canadian music project Cindy Lee, headed by Patrick Flegel. Released in early 2020 through W.25th (a subsidiary of Superior Viaduct Records), the album was thematically influenced by the life of musician Karen Carpenter, which Flegel related to deeply on a personal level. The stylistically eclectic album was preceded by the release of two singles, and received highly positive reviews from critics who have described it as provocative, eerie and haunting. It was notably longlisted for the 2020 Polaris Music Prize.

== Background ==
In an interview with The Fader, Flegel spoke of how the rigorous touring schedule of their former band Women took a toll on the interpersonal relationships within the group, culminating in an onstage brawl in October 2010 that subsequently led to the cancellation of the remainder of the tour and the band's dissolution. Admitting that they have a "pretty thin skin", Flegel said that their frame of mind during the emotionally-draining tour drew them to "deeply research" the life of their favorite singer Karen Carpenter - who would go on to become a "significant figure in the Cindy Lee mythos" due to her personal struggles with issues such as anorexia & exploitation by her associates. "On a micro scale," they said, "I had a similar situation that I could relate to where I had pretty severe mental health issues. I [also] empathized with her because she's this extreme suburban Shakespeare tale of living the dream and then having all of these peripheral people profiting off of their work." They further describe the album as "A cautionary thing of like, be careful what you wish for."

== Recording ==
What's Tonight to Eternity? was recorded at Flegel's own Realistik Studios in Montreal. Unlike previous Cindy Lee albums, it was recorded almost entirely by Flegel themself in order to exert complete control over the process. To create the necessary atmosphere for the recording process, Flegel watched "a stream of movies during the recording and playback", especially those by Kenneth Anger. "When you're just sitting at a desk," they said, "it's cool to look at some magical, mystical, glorious footage. It's one of these things where [if] you're bummed out by what you're doing, aligning it with something that's a masterpiece tricks yourself into thinking it's good." Their younger brother Andrew is credited with playing drums on the album on its Bandcamp page.

== Content ==
=== Style and themes ===
Daniel Sylvester of Exclaim! called What's Tonight to Eternity? a "diverse" and "genre-less" album that "runs the sonic gamut, leaving behind zero regard for a uniform sound, style or even structure." "While every Cindy Lee album wields an uneasy juxtaposition of melody and noise," writes Zach Schonfeld for Paste, "Flegel strikes a remarkably precarious balance between the two on What’s Tonight To Eternity." Similarly, according to Jack Denton of Pitchfork, the album "strikes a provocative balance of ’60s pop bliss and horror-show unease." Aquarium Drunkard wrote that the album belongs "on the shelf somewhere between contemporary sound-alchemists like Ariel Pink, John Maus and The Caretaker and timeless songwriters like Roy Orbison and Shadow Morton." According to Flegel, the album also thematically explores the "negative space" between "public and private, perception and reality, popularity and denunciation." "The characteristic intimacy of Karen Carpenter’s voice is absent here," writes Denton, "with Flegel’s earnest falsetto often rendered as a galactically distant echo. Instead, the singer’s presence is felt through other aesthetics often associated with her, like Richard Carpenter’s saccharine string arrangements and doo-wop-inspired backing vocals."

=== Songs ===
The album "begins in Youth Lagoon-esque territory of lightly psychedelic whimsy, with blooping whale sounds over serene keyboards and a dash of smooth-jazz saxophone beamed straight from some 6-CD changer. Soon, though, the already decaying audio [is] overwhelmed by shrieking static and aggressive squawks that, with an added beat, sound like they could go viral on TikTok—as if the placid recording studio were suddenly torn apart by a tornado." The opening track "Plastic Raincoat" is "an ethereal mood piece, featuring Flegel's beautifully strained vocals". Denton connects its lyrics ("Plastic raincoat/Protect me from rot") to Flegel's need to adopt a "diva fantasy" as Cindy Lee in order to survive a "hellish world". The second single from the album, "I Want You to Suffer" has been described as an "epic" and a "capsule of the album in song". The "marathon seven-and-a-half-minute highlight [...] mutates from technicolor art-pop that sounds so brittle it might crumble to sheer, cacophonic noise and then back again—except now the tempo has been slowed to a mournful crawl." The middle noise section has been compared to the "guitar breakdown[s]" of Sonic Youth. Flegel described the song as a "cathartic" experience, elaborating in a press release:

‘I Want You to Suffer’ is about my feelings regarding being abused and wanting severe punishment and revenge. It is also a rumination on alienation and repression in the wake of authority figures telling you that you are insane for your entire adolescence, when you are truly just reacting to what is happening to you. As you grow older, you realize that the identity and stances that have been adopted remain part of the same poisonous framework that you had been trying to escape. In the end, all that is left is the aching desire to be loved and trusted, despite a string of failures on your part.

"The Limit" is a "woozy waltz that sounds damaged and distant, like it’s being beamed down from space", in which "the melody and noise components are one and the same". "One Second to Toe the Line" has been described as a "jagged toy piano ditty until it decides not to be". The track features "Flegel’s patented shimmery, intricate guitar lines and stands out on the album as the closest thing to a straightforward reconstruction of a warm, ‘60s pop song about yearning." The 7-minute "Lucifer Stand" features "menacing synths" and a "pulsing, new-wave" energy "which reiterates, in a slightly different method, the ominous gothic overtones of What’s Tonight To Eternity’s melancholic commentary on the loss of love in its many forms." The song "marinates in evil", and ends with "a spoken-word sample of religious testimony, a woman describes finding herself abandoned by Jesus, stuck in a kind of purgatory where she can neither live nor die. Fed up, she resolves to reject Satan, even if that means being cast into the ether. "I would rather spend eternity in nothing," she declares, "than to spend eternity with you."" Flegel spoke of the source & purpose of the recording in a Reddit AMA:

The spoken part of Lucifer Stand is from a video testimonial, a testimony is a public declaration of a persons revelation or spiritual awakening/turning point. I've had experiences that mirror what she is saying, so I could empathize with her sense of this spiritual warfare / circling spiritual attack, while to an outsider her just being alone at home in her living room. This scene taps into the limits/potentials of our reality

"Just for Loving You I Pay the Price" has been described as a "barely-there, echo-laden noir ballad." It has been called a "washed-out ballad about toxic relationships—only slight imperfections in the ambiance arise from the occasional singing from Flegel, but these vocals barely even reach the surface, again signaling something more poisonous beneath the glistening surface." "Speaking From Above" features "ruminative electric piano [that] sutures the song’s harsh distortion to its fleshy bass, finding a satisfied groove amid the ongoing discomforts of being alive." The closing track - and the album's first single - "Heavy Metal" has been called "a floaty retro pop song produced with a noisy indie-rock edge, like Deerhunter writing a '60s prom ballad." The song "filters" the album's "internal conflict" between "nothingness and the pain of the world" through a "parodic costume of girl-group fadeout, reaching a tentative rapprochement between these many selves." The song is also a tribute to former Women member Chris Reimer, who died in 2012 at the age of 26.

== Release ==
What's Tonight to Eternity? was released on Valentine's Day, February 14, 2020. It was released through W.25th Records, a sub-label of Superior Viaduct. It was issued primarily on LP, though it's also available to stream for free on Bandcamp.

=== Packaging ===
According to The Fader, the album's monochromatic cover art – designed by Andrea Lukic – "depicts two androgynous figures locked in each others' arms – their bodies are pinned in the corner of a candlelit chamber, so desperately intertwined they seem to consume each other. The perspective of the illustration makes the characters look like they're drawing the last moments of solace from an encroaching, villainous outside world, of which the viewer is an ambassador."

=== Music video ===
A video for the single "Heavy Metal" was released to YouTube, and was credited to Realistik Studios.

=== Critical reception ===
Professional ratings
Review scores
Source	Rating
BeatRoute	5/5 stars
Exclaim!	9/10
Paste	8.4/10
Pitchfork	7.1/10

The album was very positively reviewed. "On What's Tonight to Eternity," writes Sylvester, "Cindy Lee show off their mighty range while somehow managing to sound like a perfectly constructed, singular vision." Schonfeld called it "bracing and damaged pop music about what it means to be an outsider in a world where the Karen Carpenters don’t always survive. [The album] also functions as an elegiac salute to the ghost of Women, a band that left us too soon and never quite received its due." In a year-end round-up, Aquarium Drunkard called it "a masterpiece of pop-hauntology; a deconstructionist orchestra of girl group melody and Metal Machine Music distortion." Alex Edkins of the noise rock band Metz wrote an article praising the album for Talkhouse, writing that it "is not background music to be enjoyed with a latte. You really need to give your undivided attention to it and let its haunting atmosphere take over. Underneath the harsh exterior is truly beautiful music centered around Cindy Lee’s ghostly falsetto." He concludes by calling it "a cinematic journey with lots of twists and turns that I enjoy more and more each listen. It’s a trip." Katie Rife of The A.V. Club jokingly wrote that the album "bridges the gap between Valentine’s Day and Halloween with a set of love songs that sound like a ghostly ’60s girl group performing for a crowd of teenagers killed in motorcycle accidents at a haunted sock hop." Despite a more relatively mixed score, Denton's review of the album is also ultimately quite positive in nature.

What's Tonight to Eternity? also appeared on many year-end lists. Beats Per Minute ranked it 33rd on their list, praising its "cinematic" qualities. Sputnikmusic's staff ranked it the 23rd best album of 2020, calling it "an album of considerable beauty and surprising comforts; never in spite of its tumult, and always because of it."

=== Awards ===
What's Tonight to Eternity? was longlisted for the 2020 Polaris Music Prize, but failed to secure a nomination.

== Track listing ==
=== Side one ===
1. "Plastic Raincoat" – 3:22
2. "I Want You to Suffer" – 7:37
3. "The Limit" – 4:24
4. "What's Tonight to Eternity" – 2:07
5. "One Second to Toe the Line" – 3:02

=== Side two ===
1. "Lucifer Stand" – 7:20
2. "Speaking From Above" – 5:33
3. "Just for Loving You I Pay the Price" – 4:39
4. "Heavy Metal" – 4:00

== Personnel ==
Cindy Lee is credited as the primary artist on the album.

- Andrew Flegel – drums
- Andrea Lukic – artwork
