= Ice Cream (band) =

Canadian synthpop band

- Origin: Toronto, Ontario, Canada
- Genre: Synth-pop
- Years active: 2014–present
- Label: Bad Actors Inc.
- Members: Amanda Crist, Carlyn Bezic

Ice Cream is a Canadian synthpop band from Toronto, Ontario, consisting of Amanda Crist and Carlyn Bezic. They are most noted for their 2019 album Fed Up, which was longlisted for the 2020 Polaris Music Prize.

== History ==
Crist and Bezic have known each other since age 14, when they were both attending Earl Haig Secondary School in the Toronto district of North York. At school, they also knew 'Simone TB' and Max Turnbull–the four have been part of the band Darlene Shrugg since 2013, and were part of the band U.S. Girls. Crist formed The Huckleberry Friends; Bezic started out with Golden Ticket, Madam Raz and Blonde Elvis. Both women are singers and multi-instrumentalists who often use modified and 'found' instruments.

They decided to form a band in 2014, and released the single "Science". They found a label in Bad Actors Inc. and, in 2016, released their full-length debut album Love, Ice Cream. Fed Up followed in 2019, several months after the release of its lead single "Peanut Butter". The album was also supported by selected concert dates in Europe and Canada, both as headliners and as an opening act for Zeus.

In 2019, they independently released the album Fed Up. In 2021, Bezic launched a solo project, Jane Inc.

== Discography ==
Albums

- Love, Ice Cream (2016), Bad Actors
- Fed Up (2019), Independent

Compilation Inclusion

- Tone Deaf Live, Vol. 1 (2015), Tone Deaf Records
