= Junia-T =

Canadian rapper

Junia-T is the stage name of Jonathan Lindo, a Canadian producer/artist from Toronto, Ontario. He is most noted for his album Studio Monk, which was longlisted for the 2020 Polaris Music Prize.

He was previously associated with the duo Smash Brovaz, who released the album Think It’s A Game? in 2012. Junia-T then released his solo debut Eye See You in 2014. Discouraged by the album's lack of success, he considered quitting the music business for a time, but found his creative perspective refreshed after joining Addy Papa's Riot Club sessions. He signed with Pirates Blend, Studio Monk, his second album, was released on that label in January 2020.

He also works as touring DJ with Jessie Reyez, who contributed vocals on both of Junia-T's solo albums.

He was the producer of Cadence Weapon's 2026 album Forager, also directly appearing as a guest musician on some tracks. The song "Step Out", which also featured DijahSB, was longlisted for the 2026 SOCAN Polaris Song Prize.

== Discography ==
=== Albums ===
- Eye See You (2014)
- Studio Monk (2021)
- Forager (2026)
