= Diamond Jubilee (album) =

Studio album by Cindy Lee
- Released: 29 March 2024
- Studios: Realistik (Toronto, Durham, Calgary, Montreal); Centre of the Universe (Montreal)
- Genres: Hypnagogic pop; psychedelic pop; indie rock; brill building; slacker rock; noise pop; lo-fi
- Length: 122:09
- Label: Realistik: Superior Viaduct
- Producers: Patrick Flegel; Steven Lind

Cindy Lee chronology
Cat o' Nine Tales (2020)	Diamond Jubilee (2024)

Diamond Jubilee is the seventh studio album by Canadian band Cindy Lee, the project of musician Patrick Flegel. A triple album (double CD), it was released on 29 March 2024 on Flegel's own label Realistik Studios, available exclusively on YouTube or for purchase from a Web 1.0-style Realistik Studios website. On 23 October 2024, it was released on Bandcamp and physical pre-orders were made available. Later that year, Superior Viaduct's sublabel W.25TH released a CD and triple LP (available in gold or black vinyl) of the album.

The album received widespread critical acclaim upon its release, listed by Pitchfork as the best album of 2024 and the third best album of the first half of the 2020s.

== Album cover ==
The building on the cover of the album is the Alberta Terminals Limited grain elevator located in Lethbridge, Alberta.

== Critical reception ==
Professional ratings
Aggregate scores
Source	Rating
AnyDecentMusic?	8.4/10
Metacritic	91/100
Review scores
Source	Rating
AllMusic	4.5/5 stars
Beats Per Minute	89%
laut.de	4/5 stars
Mladina	4/5
OndaRock	8/10
Paste	9.2/10
Pitchfork	9.1/10
Uncut	9/10

Diamond Jubilee was released to widespread critical acclaim. According to the review aggregator Metacritic, Diamond Jubilee received "universal acclaim" based on a weighted average score of 91 out of 100 from 7 critic scores. Andy Cush of Pitchfork gave the album a 9.1/10 review, calling it "an essential trove of music" where "each song is like a foggy transmission from a rock 'n' roll netherworld with its own ghostly canon of beloved hits". It was the highest rating awarded by the website to a new album since Fiona Apple's 2020 album Fetch the Bolt Cutters.

Concluding the review for AllMusic, Marcy Donelson called the album "a sprawling epic whose uncanny, time-worn textures sound less like a vinyl alley-find and more like a cassette discovered in the cabin of a great-uncle's shipwrecked houseboat. It’s a beautiful, immersive, and above all, dreamlike set that easily rewards the investment in its length."

Elise Soutar of Paste rated the album 9.2/10, calling it Cindy Lee's "bittersweet magnum opus" that "is easily the densest, most rewarding body of work they have released to date—a staggering collection of psychedelic pop songs that can be difficult to tackle head on, if only due to the sheer quantity and quality of the work". Exclaim! gave the album a Staff Pick, with reviewer Kaelen Bell writing, "Built on strains of '50s girl group pop, lush '60s psychedelia, itchy '70s radio rock, lo-fi '90s clutter and sparkling production choices grafted on from some alternate universe, Diamond Jubilee feels like the defining portrait of Cindy Lee as both artist and vessel."

The album was a shortlisted finalist for the 2024 Polaris Music Prize.

In year-end lists, music review publications Pitchfork, Exclaim!, and Gorilla vs. Bear named Diamond Jubilee the best album of 2024.

In 2026, Pitchfork ranked Diamond Jubilee #10 on their list of the 100 Best Indie Rock Albums of All Time.

== Track listing ==
All lyrics are written by Patrick Flegel; all music is composed by Patrick Flegel except for "Baby Blue" by Patrick Flegel and Steven Lind.

Disc one
No.	Title	Length
1.	"Diamond Jubilee"	5:22
2.	"Glitz"	4:10
3.	"Baby Blue"	3:55
4.	"Dreams of You"	2:46
5.	"All I Want Is You"	3:00
6.	"Dallas"	3:15
7.	"Olive Drab"	1:31
8.	"Always Dreaming"	3:43
9.	"Wild One"	2:04
10.	"Flesh and Blood"	5:13
11.	"Le Machiniste fantome"	1:02
12.	"Kingdom Come"	4:42
13.	"Demon Bitch"	4:24
14.	"I Have My Doubts"	3:32
15.	"Til Polarity's End"	4:04
16.	"Realistik Heaven"	3:42
Total length:		56:25

Disc two
No.	Title	Length
1.	"Stone Faces"	4:22
2.	"Gayblevision"	2:56
3.	"Dracula"	6:08
4.	"Lockstepp"	4:39
5.	"Government Cheque"	5:06
6.	"Deepest Blue"	2:57
7.	"To Heal This Wounded Heart"	3:33
8.	"Golden Microphone"	2:49
9.	"If You Hear Me Crying"	4:01
10.	"Darling of the Diskoteque"	3:04
11.	"Don't Tell Me I'm Wrong"	4:48
12.	"What's It Going to Take"	3:29
13.	"Wild Rose"	3:50
14.	"Durham City Limit"	5:24
15.	"Crime of Passion"	3:13
16.	"24/7 Heaven"	5:25
Total length:		65:44

== Personnel ==
- Patrick Flegel – performance, engineering, production
- Steven Lind – guitar ("Baby Blue", "Durham City Limit"); bass ("Demon Bitch" and "Til Polarity's End"); drums ("Baby Blue", "Wild One"); synthesizer and strings ("Baby Blue", "Always Dreaming", "Flesh and Blood", "Dracula", "Lockstepp"); claps ("Wild Rose"); engineering, production, mixing
- Joshua Stevenson – mastering

== Charts ==
Chart performance for Diamond Jubilee
Chart (2025)	Peak position
Belgian Albums (Ultratop Flanders)	85
Scottish Albums (Official Charts)	14
UK Independent Albums (Official Charts)	8
