= Dabakan =

Philippine drum

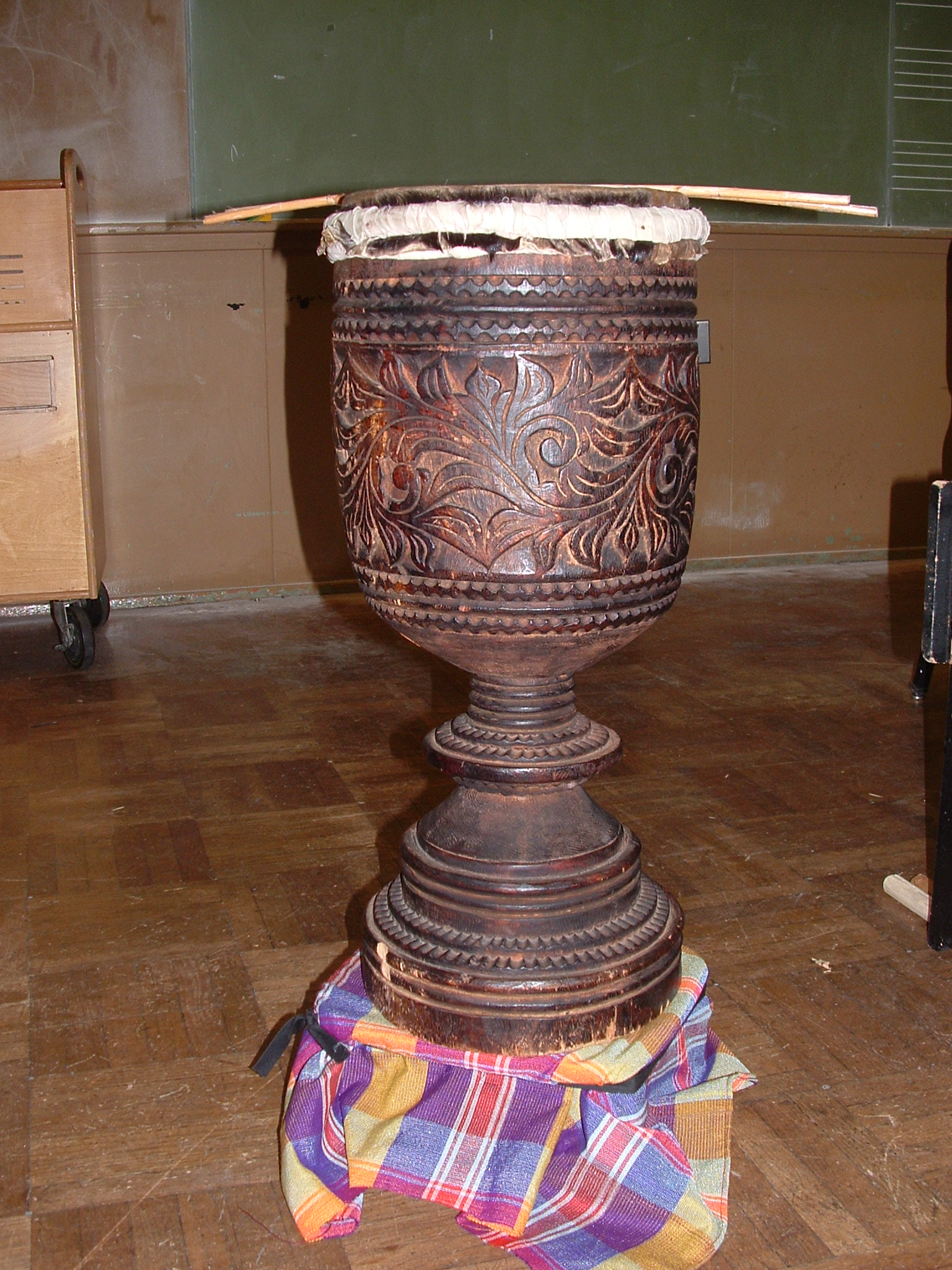
- Classification: Percussion instrument; Membranophone; Drum

Playing range
- Not tuned

Related instruments
- kendang, gandang, gandrang, dombak, tombak, kimbal and sulibao

More articles or information
- Goblet Drum

The dabakan is a single-headed Philippine drum, primarily used as a supportive instrument in the kulintang ensemble. Among the five main kulintang instruments, it is the only non-gong element of the Maguindanao ensemble.

== Etymology ==
The origin of the name "dabakan," is said to have been borrowed and adapted from the Middle East. Dabakan is derived from the word, dbak meaning to "hit, strike, or beat," meaning that the dabakan is something upon which you hit. Scholars also suggest that another clue is that the dabakan may have been an adaptation and enlargement of a pan-Arabic goblet drum, the dombak/tombak.

== Description ==
The dabakan is frequently described as either hour-glass, conical, tubular, or goblet in shape. Normally, the dabakan is found having a length of more than two feet and a diameter of more than a foot about the widest part of the shell. The shell is carved from wood either out of the trunk of a coconut tree or the wood of a jackfruit tree which is then hollowed out throughout its body and stem. The drumhead that is stretched over the shell is made out of either goatskin, carabao skin, deer rawhide, or snake/lizard skin, with the last considered by many dabakan practitioners as the best material to use. The drumhead is then fastened to the shell first via small metal wire and then using two hoops of rattan very tightly to allow the rattan sticks to bounce cleanly. Artists, especially the Maranao, would then carve the outside of the shell with elaborate and decorative okkil patterns.

== Technique ==
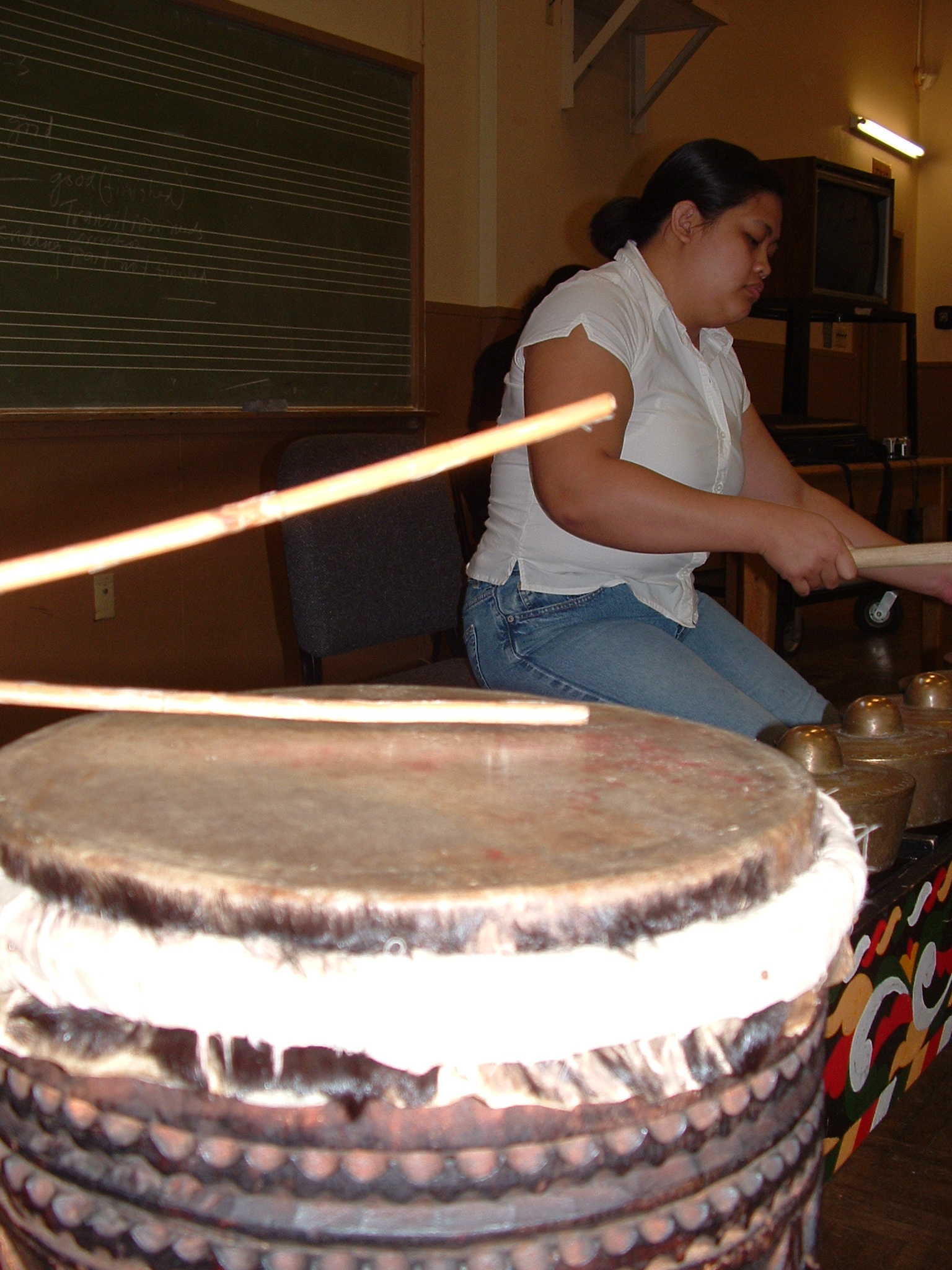
Proper way of hitting the dabakan's drumhead parallel to its surface with a pair of rattan drumsticks.

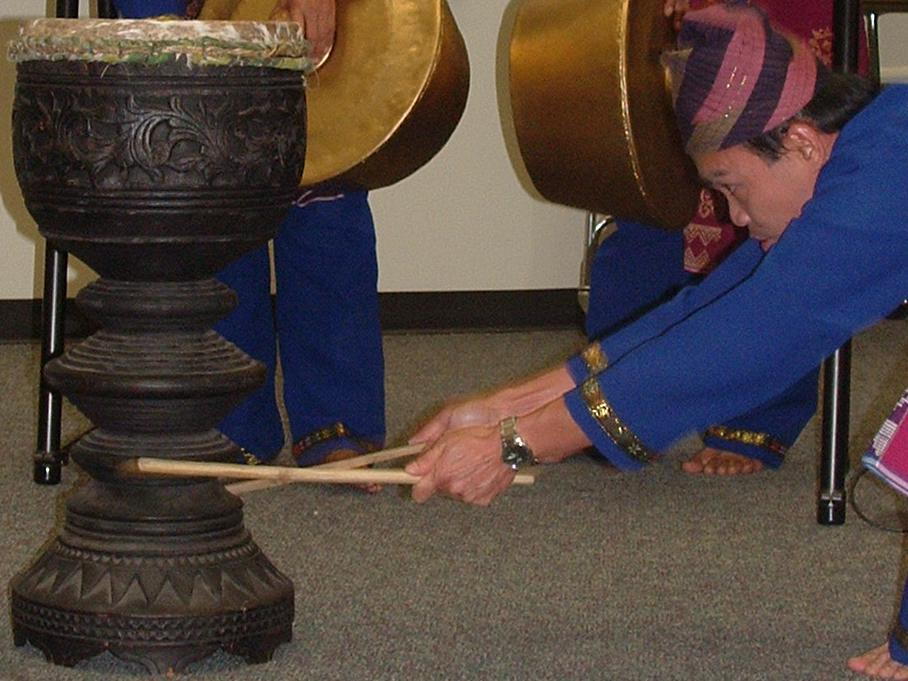
An exhibition of the dabakan by a Magui Moro Master Artist

The dabakan is normally played while standing with the player holding two sticks made either out of rattan or bamboo but the player could be sitting or kneeling instead. The rattan strips are held parallel to the surface of the drumhead and are then pivoted between the thumb and forefinger using the wrist to activate them to strike the drumhead's surface along the entire length of its diameter. The sounds produced are normally quick and muted and thanks to the flexibility of the strips, a player can employ dampening, roll, or open stroke patterns upon its surface.

Thanks to the exposure of many artists to Western culture, new styles of playing have emerged among the newer generation of players. These include playing rhythmic patterns for the dabakan not on the surface of the drumhead but on the sides of the shell and even at the edges of the drum's mouth. These exhibition-style pieces are used to shift focus away from the melody instrument, the kulintang, and onto the other supportive instruments such as the dabakan.

== Uses ==
The main use for the dabakan in Maguindanao and Maranao society is as a supportive instrument in the kulintang ensemble, keeping the tempo of the ensemble in check like the babendil. On most rhythmic modes, such as sinulog and duyog, the dabakan enters after babandil but in tidto, where the babendil is absent, the dabakan always starts the piece. The Maguindanao and the Maranao usually position the dabakan to the right of the kulintang player, near the end of its frame, during a traditional performance.

The dabakan could be used in other types of playing other than the ensemble. The dabakan could be used as the accompaniment for the kutiyapi, a type of Philippine boat-lute. The dabakan plays a major role in a type of playing known as Kasorondayong. In the Maranao version, which is in recognition of their prince hero, Prince Bantogen, two dbakan players face one another, standing behind their dabakans, striking them with two slender bamboo sticks while playing an interlocking rhythm.

Traditionally, the dabakan is considered a masculine instrument by the Maranao and a feminine instrument by the Maguindanao but as a sign of the times, one could see both men and women handling the dabakan. In wooden kulintang ensembles, the takemba, a bamboo zither of the Manobo, is usually substituted for the dabakan part.

During older times, the bigger, longer double-headed dabakan, known as a dadabooan, would be hung horizontally in the mosque (See Kendang, for smaller version of this drum). An imam (spiritual leader) would hit the drum repeatedly announcing the beginning of prayer time throughout the outlying areas. As a sign of the times, the dabakan in Mindanao have now been replaced by more modern equipment such as a speakerphone but the practice still continues in places like Sulawesi, where a mesigit, equivalent to the dabakan, would be used for the same purpose.

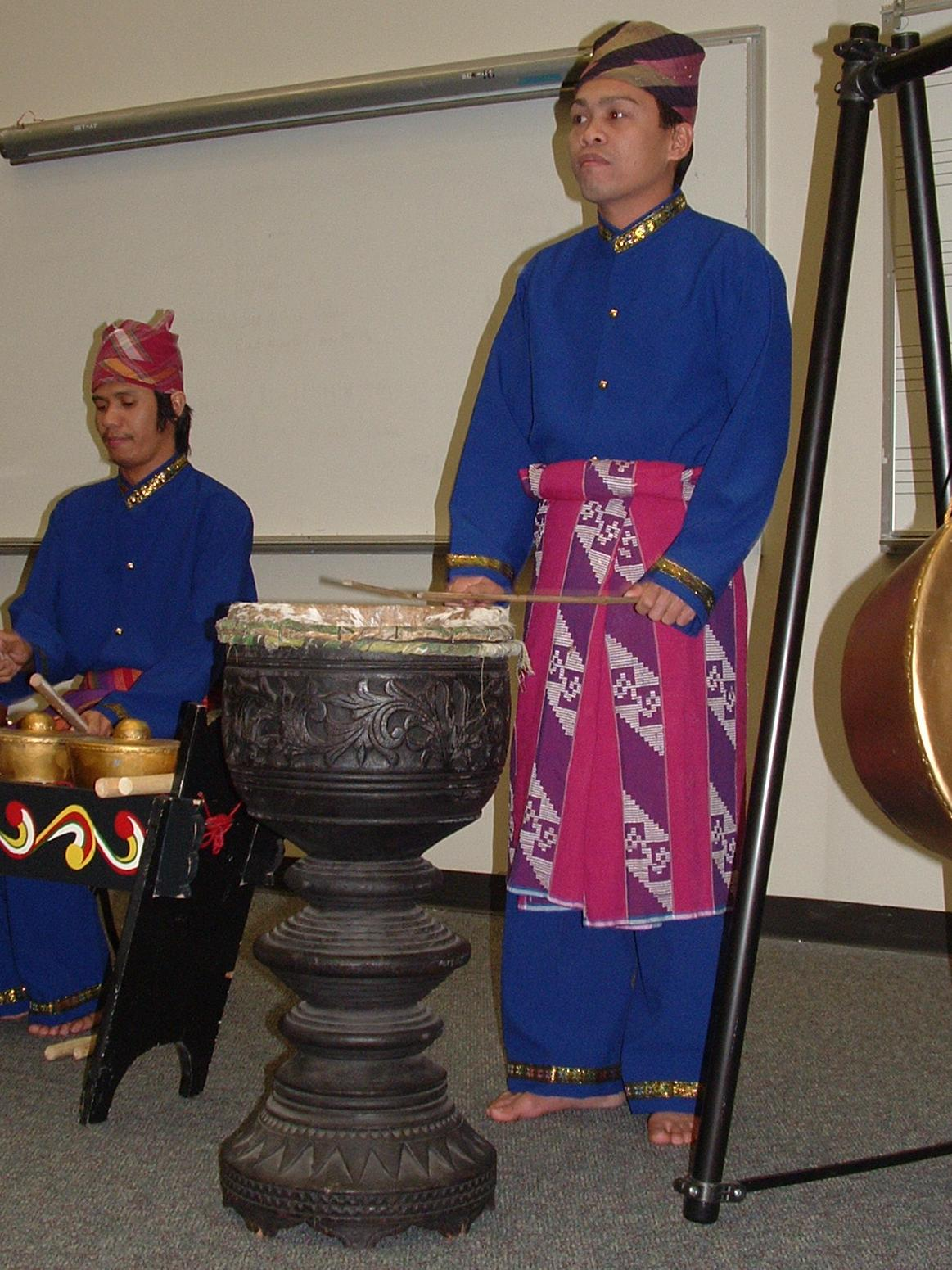
Playing the dabakan as part of the kulintang ensemble

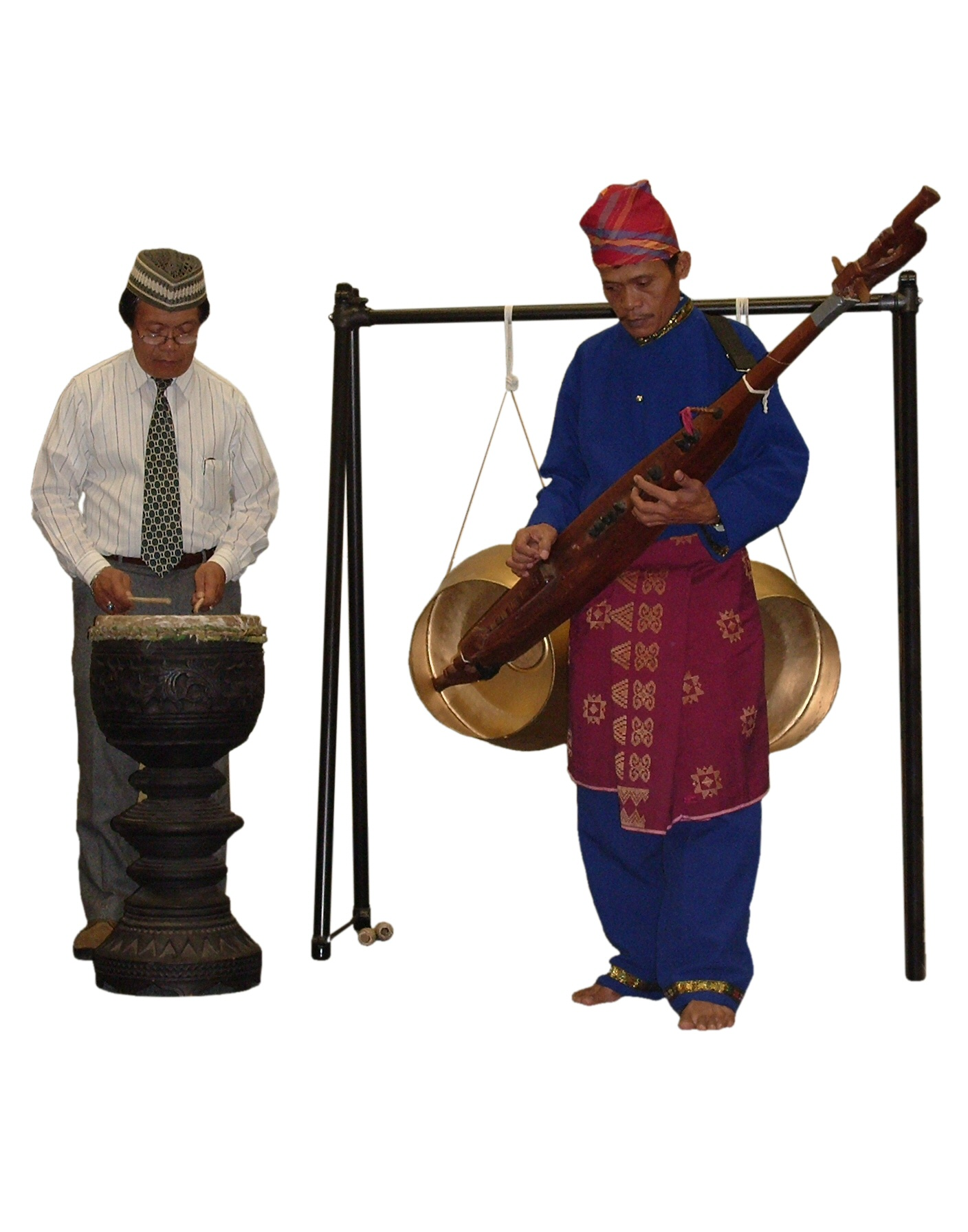
The dabakan used as accompaniment of the kutiyapi

== Other derivative names ==
It is also called a dbakan, debakan (Maguindanao), dadabuan, dadaboon (Maranao), libbit (Tausug), tibubu (Poso) and a tiwal (Kulawi and Minahasa).
