= Nipiy =

nipiy

Studio album by nêhiyawak
- Released: October 24, 2019
- Recorded: Hive Studios, Vancouver Island
- Label: Arts & Crafts Records
- Producer: Colin Stewart

nipiy is the debut album by Edmonton-based band nêhiyawak, released on October 24, 2019, on Arts & Crafts Productions. It was nominated for Indigenous Music Album of the Year at the 2020 Juno Awards, and shortlisted for the 2020 Polaris Music Prize.

== Background and themes ==
The album was produced by Colin Stewart, who also produced their 2018 EP starlight. It was recorded at Stewart's Hive Studios, located on Vancouver Island.

nipiy is a Cree word for water. Many tracks contain references to issues affecting Indigenous Canadians; the album was largely inspired by the Idle No More movement. The track disappear references the disappearance of Indigenous people in Canada and Honduras, and was inspired by a 2013 lecture by Bertha Oliva, while Perch was written about addiction. open window is about the Residential School System and the Sixties Scoop, and features Cree-language spoken-word poetry from band member Kris Harper's parents. The Cree language can also be seen in song titles: the opening and closing tracks are named after kisiskâciwanisîpiy, the Cree word for the North Saskatchewan River, while the track ôtênaw, which discusses urbanization, is named after the Cree word for city. The album also features elements of Indigenous music, including the use of traditional instrumentation. Marek Tyler plays an elk-hide frame drum, a carved cedar log drum, and a pow-wow drum, gifted to him by Carey Newman, a Kwakwakaʼwakw and Coast Salish artist.

== Critical reception ==
Professional ratings
Review scores
Source	Rating
Exclaim!	8/10
The Manitoban	4/5

The album received positive reviews from critics. Andrea Warner called nipiy "one of the best rock albums of the year" in a CBC piece highlighting nêhiyawak as one of 7 Canadian artists who broke out in 2019. Jake Cardinal, writing for Edmonton Scene, said that nêhiyawak "created an album without any bad songs, which is a feat nowadays, but they have also managed to find a style that is fully their own."

nipiy was listed by BeatRoute as one of the 10 Best Alberta Releases of 2019.
