= Lauren Crazybull =

Canadian visual artist

- Born: Lauren Crazybull; 1994 (age 30–31)
- Known for: portraiture
- Website: www.laurencrazybull.com

Lauren Crazybull is a Blackfoot, Dene visual artist currently based in Vancouver, British Columbia and Alberta's first provincial Artist in Residence. Lauren is originally from Alberta, Canada.

== Career ==
In 2019, Lauren was one of the 30 finalists for the Kingston Prize, a Canada-wide competition for portrait painting. In 2020, TIME Magazine commissioned her to paint the portrait of Wilma Mankiller for 100 Women of the Year project.

Conor McNally's documentary focusing on her life and work, IIKAAKIIMAAT, provides viewers with a personal story of resiliency has been shown at the LA Skin Fest and the imageNATIVE festival in Toronto.

== Alberta Artist in Residence ==
In 2019, Crazybull was appointed Alberta's first provincial Artist in Residence. With roughly over 100 other applicants, Crazybull was the first to ever hold the job. The position came with a grant and responsibilities that include attending cultural events and serving as an advocate for artists. Her residency culminated in a solo exhibition titled "TSIMA KOHTOTSITAPIIHPA Where are you from?" from January 24 - April 4, 2020 at Latitude 53.

== Selected exhibitions, residencies, and publications ==
- McLuhan House Residency, 2018
- Alberta Artist in Residence, 2019
- Eldon and Anne Foote Edmonton Visual Arts Prize, 2020
- Cover illustration for This Wound Is A World by Billy-Ray Belcourt in 2019
- The Future All At Once, McMullen Gallery, 2019.
- Time Magazine cover, 2020
