= 2020 Polaris Music Prize =

Canadian music award

- Date: October 19, 2020
- Country: Canada
- Hosted by: Saroja Coelho
- Winner(s): God Has Nothing to Do With This Leave Him Out of It (Backxwash)
- Website: polarismusicprize.ca

The 2020 edition of the Canadian Polaris Music Prize was presented on October 19, 2020. The longlist was announced on June 15, 2020, with the shortlist following on July 15, 2020 and the winner announced on October 19, 2020. Due to the COVID-19 pandemic, the traditional winner's gala did not take place this year, and instead a special cinematic tribute to the shortlist was streamed online by CBC Music and CBC Gem, following which the winner was announced.

The award was won by Backxwash for the album God Has Nothing to Do With This Leave Him Out of It.

The livestreamed presentation received a Canadian Screen Award nomination for Best Live Production for Social Media at the 9th Canadian Screen Awards.

== Shortlist ==
The shortlist was announced July 15, 2020 in a radio special on CBC Music hosted by Angeline Tetteh-Wayoe. Three of the shortlisted artists (Caribou, Kaytranada, and Lido Pimienta) have won a previous Polaris Music Prize, with two (Jessie Reyez and U.S. Girls) having previously been shortlisted.

- Backxwash, God Has Nothing to Do with This Leave Him Out of It
- Caribou, Suddenly
- Junia-T, Studio Monk
- Kaytranada, Bubba
- nêhiyawak, nipiy
- Pantayo, Pantayo
- Lido Pimienta, Miss Colombia
- Jessie Reyez, Before Love Came to Kill Us
- U.S. Girls, Heavy Light
- Witch Prophet, DNA Activation

== Longlist ==
The longlist consists of 40 albums, chosen by a panel of 199 Canadian jurors. Eligible albums must have been released between June 1, 2019, and May 31, 2020, although albums from May 2019 were considered if they didn't make the 2019 longlist.

- Allie X, Cape God
- Anachnid, Dreamweaver
- Aquakultre, Legacy
- Marie-Pierre Arthur, Des feux pour voir
- Backxwash, God Has Nothing to Do with This Leave Him Out of It
- Badge Époque Ensemble, Badge Époque Ensemble
- Begonia, Fear
- P'tit Belliveau, Greatest Hits Vol. 1
- Caribou, Suddenly
- Daniel Caesar, Case Study 01
- Chocolat, Jazz engagé
- Cindy Lee, What's Tonight to Eternity?
- Louis-Jean Cormier, Quand la nuit tombe
- Corridor, Junior
- dvsn, A Muse in Her Feelings
- Jacques Greene, Dawn Chorus
- Sarah Harmer, Are You Gone
- Ice Cream, FED UP
- Junia-T, Studio Monk
- Kaytranada, Bubba
- Flore Laurentienne, Volume 1
- Men I Trust, Oncle Jazz
- nêhiyawak, nipiy
- OBUXUM, Re-birth
- Owen Pallett, Island
- Pantayo, Pantayo
- Lido Pimienta, Miss Colombia
- Joel Plaskett, 44
- William Prince, Reliever
- Jessie Reyez, Before Love Came to Kill Us
- Riit, ataataga
- Andy Shauf, The Neon Skyline
- Super Duty Tough Work, Studies in Grey
- U.S. Girls, Heavy Light
- Leif Vollebekk, New Ways
- Wares, Survival
- The Weeknd, After Hours
- WHOOP-Szo, Warrior Down
- Witch Prophet, DNA Activation
- Zen Bamboo, GLU

== Polaris Heritage Prize ==
Nominees for the Slaight Family Polaris Heritage Prize, an award to honour classic Canadian albums released before the creation of the Polaris Prize, were announced on October 22. The winners of the public and jury votes were announced on November 16.

- Public: Beverly Glenn-Copeland, Keyboard Fantasies
- Jury: Main Source, Breaking Atoms
- Jury: Buffy Sainte-Marie, It's My Way!
- Robert Charlebois and Louise Forestier, Lindberg
- Deborah Cox, One Wish
- Great Speckled Bird, Great Speckled Bird
- Jean Leloup, Le Dôme
- Maestro Fresh Wes, Symphony in Effect
- Jackie Mittoo, Wishbone
- Michel Pagliaro, Pagliaro
- Jackie Shane, Jackie Shane Live
- Thrush Hermit, Clayton Park
