= Sulibao =

Philippine hand drum

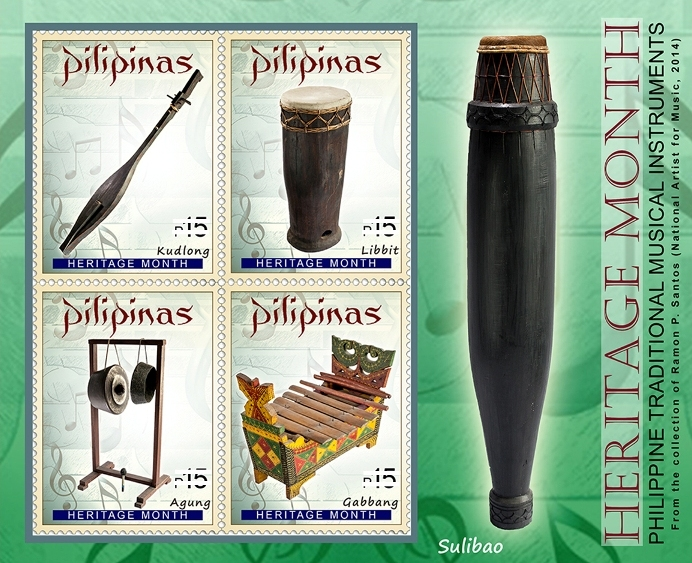
Sulibao (right) on a 2016 stamp sheet of the Philippines

A solibao is a conical tenor drum played by the Bontoc and Ibaloi people of the Philippines. It is played with the palms of both hands. It usually appears as part of an ensemble along with the kimbal, pinsak, kalsa and palas. Sulibao is made from a hollowed out log covered with deer skin.
