= Keyboard Fantasies =

Studio album by Beverly Glenn-Copeland
- Released: 1986
- Studio: Audio-Logic Recording Studio, Huntsville, Ontario
- Genre: New age; electronic; downtempo; folk; ambient
- Length: 39:26
- Label: Atlast
- Producer: Beverly Glenn-Copeland

Beverly Glenn-Copeland chronology
At Last! (1980)	Keyboard Fantasies (1986)	Primal Prayer (as Phynix, 2004)

Keyboard Fantasies (stylized as ...Keyboard Fantasies...) is the third studio album by Canadian musician Beverly Glenn-Copeland, self-released on Atlast Records as a cassette in 1986, a time when Glenn-Copeland was best known for his children's television music. The album was inspired by the nature and environment of his home in Huntsville, Ontario, including the surrounding lakes and woods. Recorded using only a Yamaha DX7 and Roland TR-707 drum machine, the musician felt he was able to musically display the feelings that the environment gave him accurately. He felt the entirely electronic instrumentation he used was comparable to an orchestra because of the range of sounds he could create.

The album is considered to be an electronic new age album, with pensive, relaxing music and comforting vocals. Upon release, Keyboard Fantasies only sold several copies, but soon grew a reputation among audiophiles as an overlooked, pioneering electronic work. A Japanese fan known in audiophile circles contacted Glenn-Copeland to send him copies of the album in 2015 which he then sold. This helped rise the album's popularity, and soon Glenn-Copeland received offers from record labels hoping to re-release the album. Remastered and reissued on vinyl by Canadian labels Invisible City Editions and Seance Centre in 2017, the album became popular among a new generation of listeners, for whom Glenn-Copeland began performing the album live.

== Background and production ==
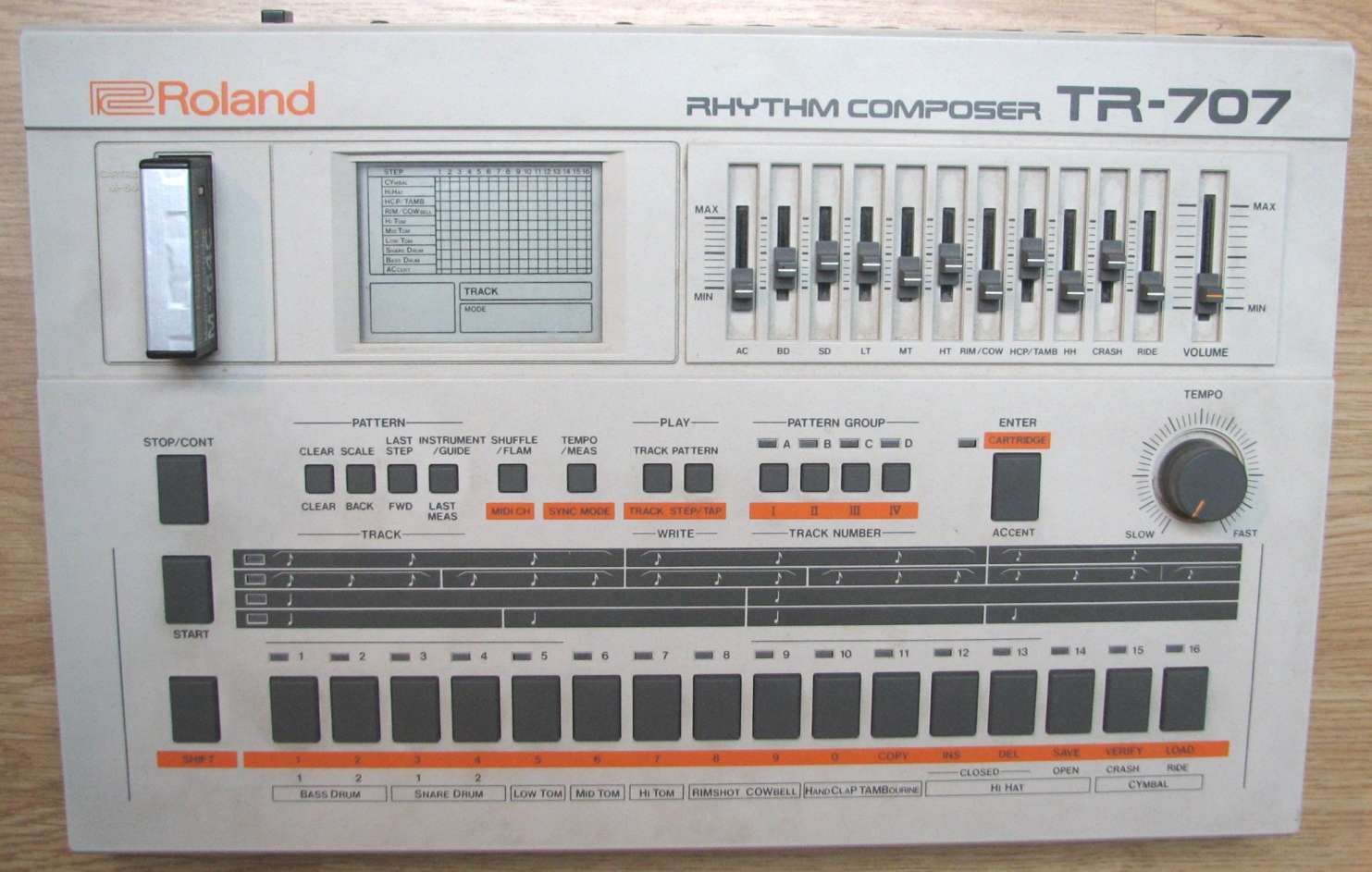
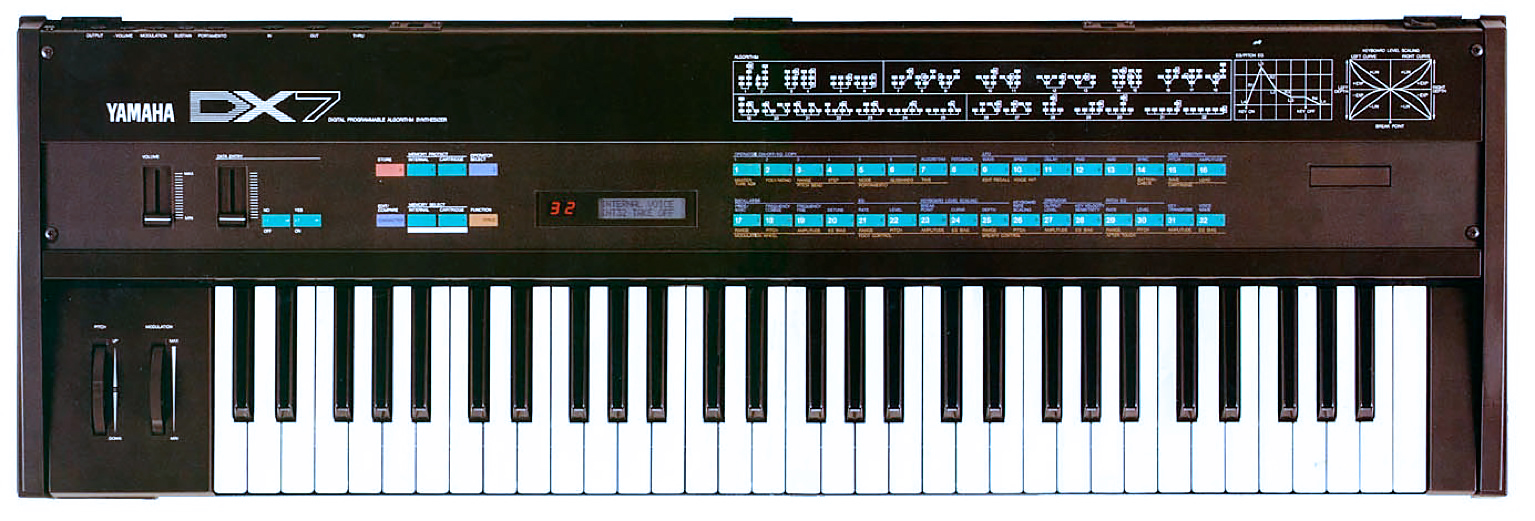
The only instrumentation on Keyboard Fantasies is the Roland TR-707 (above) and Yamaha DX7 (below).

Beverly Glenn-Copeland, born in Philadelphia but raised in Canada, worked for many years composing music for children's television, including Sesame Street. His songwriting and performing credits for children's shows also included Shining Time Station and Mr. Dressup, but he also released his own music in the meantime. This pattern was the musician's regimen for almost three decades, and he would also chant each day at home and weekly within his Buddhist group. It was during this prolonged period that he created Keyboard Fantasies in 1986, a time when he was living in Huntsville, Canada. The album was heavily inspired by the serene environment he was living in, including the surrounding woods and lakes, which he says he can "hear" in the music. He felt the album features an "innocence that was part of my experience at the time." The need to make Keyboard Fantasies was also partly born from how writing children's music restricted the musician from making "personal statements."

Recorded at Audio-Logic Recording Studio, Huntsville, Ontario, with engineering and mixing work from Colleen Veitch, Keyboard Fantasies was written on and performed entirely using a Yamaha DX7 and Roland TR-707 drum machine. Although Glenn-Copeland had discovered computers some five years beforehand, he was "waiting for them to be able to help me with music," as he later commented. He felt they were finally able to do so for the production of the album. He said the electronic instruments gave him a pallet that he felt "was essentially for me an orchestra", saying: "It allowed me to write everything I was hearing. I don't just hear melody and harmony. I hear all kinds of other lines. 'This is a cello part, this is for the horns.' It was the closest I could come and I was ecstatic and slept only three hours a night, spent all of my time in my studio going nuts." Glenn-Copeland later described himself as being in an "elevated state" during recording, and reflected that, upon hearing the album, "what I felt was that what I was listening to was these woods, and to my reaction to this environment."

== Composition ==
"Recorded in Huntsville, Ontario using an array of synths, computers and drum machines, the music vividly encapsulates a strange synthesis of spirituality and technology."

—Jasper Willems, Le Guess Who?

Keyboard Fantasies is an electronic new age album, which combines new-age sounds with lo-fi soul music. Writer Andrew Ryce felt that: "In scope and style, it was of a piece with American new age private press music at the time," while Red Bull Radio felt the album was a visionary combination of "digital new-age and early Detroit techno experiments." Music journalist Evan John called the release a fusion of folk, ambient and electronica. Glenn-Copeland described the music as "New Age multilayered synthesizer music to relax, dance and sing with," and felt that, in retrospect, the sounds could be described as "simplistic." Although bass-heavy and rhythmic in style, the music is relaxing and pensive, presenting a positive atmosphere, while the musician's singing is "comforting and almost wizened, like someone singing lullabies at your bedside," according to Ryce. The Yamaha DX7 and Roland TR-707 are used for a introspective and meditative feel, contributing to the album's arresting sonic style. "Winter Astral" features a warm bass line, while "Let Us Dance" features "elegant synth tones" that Ryce compared to a "decorous Romantic painting." Electric piano features throughout "Old Melody", while "Slow Dance" features somewhat exotic instrumentation which Ryce compared to the Music from Memory catalogue.

== Release and rediscovery ==
Originally self-released as a cassette tape in 1986, only a handful of copies of Keyboard Fantasies were sold. The album nonetheless became considered a "criminally overlooked and pioneering piece of electronic music" among a select group of audiophiles, according to Eric Volmers of the Calgary Herald. Among the audiophile fans was a Japanese collector named Ryota Masuko who contacted Glenn-Copeland in December 2015 to ask if he could send him any available copies of the album so he could sell them. The musician sent him 30 copies, which all sold out immediately in Japan. Glenn-Copeland then sent him another 30 copies and then his remaining stock of the album, both times seeing it continue to sell out. Unbeknown to Glenn-Copeland, Masuko was well-known in audiophile circles, and his interest in the album drew the interest of followers worldwide. Glenn-Copeland said: "I didn't know [...] he is known worldwide. People were watching what he put up, what he played." Two months later, the musician received offers from ten different record labels hoping to re-release Keyboard Fantasies on vinyl. The newfound popularity of the album helped it rise from relative obscurity.

After much anticipation, Keyboard Fantasies was remastered and reissued in February 2017 by Invisible City Editions, a Toronto-based reissue label. The Keyboard Fantasies reissue won Glenn-Copeland "almost instantaneous" appreciation. The album was re-released again on vinyl later in 2017 as the first release on Séance Centre, a reissue label dedicated to avant-garde and electronic music. Séance Centre promoted the reissue with a six-minute short film entitled The Lake Sultra, in which Glenn-Copeland revisited the environment he recorded the album in. In April 2021, a 35th anniversary edition of Keyboard Fantasies was released by British label Transgressive Records.

== Reception and legacy ==
Professional ratings
Review scores
Source	Rating
AllMusic	4/5 stars
Pitchfork	8.4/10
Resident Advisor	3.8/5

Despite Glenn-Copeland making music for 40 years, the re-issues of Keyboard Fantasies finally led to his music enjoying a wider audience. Anton Spice of The Vinyl Factory felt that the album was "now reaching a wider audience entranced by the music of fellow explorers Laraaji, Pauline Anna Strom and more." Red Bull Music Academy felt the album's "visionary approach" helped it resonate with a younger generation. Jasper Willems of Le Guess Who? called the album a "New Age classic" and noted that only since its rediscovery was it that "the full extent of this multifaceted individuals' creative past, present and future" were being realized. Josephine Cruz of Complex felt it was his most noted work.

In a review of the Invisible City Editions reissue, Andrew Ryce of Resident Advisor described Keyboard Fantasies as "modest but stunning" and praised the "arresting" music and Glenn-Copeland's "one-of-a-kind voice." He concluded: "Unabashedly sentimental as it is, Keyboard Fantasies isn't for everyone, but fans of new age and oddball synth music will find something to love in Copeland's evergreen world, which still sounds wondrous and new, even 30 years on from its original release." Boing Boing described the album as "exquisite New Age music" and felt that Seance Centre's "beautiful reissue" brought Keyboard Fantasies "into the sunlight where it belongs." Tom Ewing of Freaky Trigger felt that "[t]he keyboard fantasies themselves are indeed lovely, ethereal and relaxing," but wrote that "Glenn Copeland's vocals are more distracting – he's not a bad singer but his intensity sits slightly awkwardly with the music." He did however comment that this disjunction, which he felt bordered on 'outsider' status, was likely "what attracted the cultists to this record in the first place, of course." In 2017, The Stranger listed the album as one of the 70 greatest albums made by women. (Note: Keyboard Fantasies was recorded before Glenn-Copeland transitioned gender and still identified as female, per Ewing.) The album was the public vote winner of the Polaris Heritage Prize at the 2020 Polaris Music Prize.

Of the album's reappraisal, Glenn-Copeland said: "I'm so happy so many other people are now hearing it and going 'this is very beautiful music'. But what you should understand folks is, I'm just the messenger." The album's re-release was followed by the reissue of Glenn-Copeland's self-titled folk album from 1970, which had only originally been released in Europe. The reissues of his material dumbfounded Glenn-Copeland, who felt the experience was "unexpected." With his newfound appreciation, the musician gave a lecture at Red Bull Music Academy, where he told the story of the renewed interest in Keyboard Fantasies, and also performed shows with the Queer Songbook Orchestra of Toronto. With his new band Indigo Rising, the 74-year old Glenn-Copeland followed the Keyboard Fantasies reissues by touring after a 20 year absence. He decided to perform the album live due to the demand, commenting: "There is this young generation that is so excited about this music and it would be selfish of me to sit around going, 'I am sorry, I don't tour'." He felt the response to the performances was "profound." Keyboard Fantasies: The Beverly Glenn-Copeland Story (2019), a documentary film directed by Posy Dixon, follows Glenn-Copeland on his first ever tour.

== Track listing ==
All songs written by Beverly Glenn-Copeland.

=== Side one ===
1. "Ever New" – 7:06
2. "Winter Astral" – 6:25
3. "Let Us Dance" – 7:20

=== Side two ===
1. "Slow Dance" – 6:40
2. "Old Melody" – 4:32
3. "Sunset Village" – 7:20

== Personnel ==
Credits adapted from the 1986 liner notes.

- Beverly Glenn-Copeland – music, lyrics, voice, synthesizer, electronic drums, album cover
- Colleen Veitch – engineering, mixing
- Evelyn Wolff – design (album cover)
- Kathleen Brindley – art direction
