= Nanekawâsis =

2024 Canadian documentary film

nanekawâsis
- Directed by: Conor McNally
- Starring: George Littlechild
- Release date: May 8, 2024 (DOXA)
- Running time: 80 minutes
- Country: Canada
- Languages: English nêhiyawêwin

nanekawâsis is a Canadian documentary film, directed by Conor McNally and released in 2024. The film is a portrait of George Littlechild, a Cree artist from Canada who was separated from his family in childhood as part of the Sixties Scoop before reconnecting with his heritage as an adult, with Cree culture becoming both the basis of his career as a visual artist and the lens through which he came to terms with his identity as a two-spirit man. The film blends contemporary footage shot digitally and on 16 mm film with archival footage collected by Gil Cardinal and Tom Radford. It also features interludes of Cree poetry by Maria Buffalo, recited by Jessie Loyer.

The film premiered at the 2024 DOXA Documentary Film Festival, and was subsequently screened at the 2024 Inside Out Film and Video Festival.
