= Wahkohtowin =

Word in the Cree language

Wahkohtowin is a Cree word which denotes the interconnected nature of relationships, communities, and natural systems. Its literal meaning is "kinship", but it is often used to refer to Cree law, or Cree codes of conduct.

== Etymology ==
In the Cree language, nêhiyaw wiyasowêwina literally translates to "Cree laws", with wiyasowêwina meaning the act of weaving. However, law is almost invariably referred to as wahkohtowin, which means "kinship", in reference to an individual's relationship with, and responsibilities within, the systems of which the individual is a part. As such, "wahkohtowin" is not totally equivalent to the dominant western conceptions of "law", for example because Cree wâhkôtowin does not refer solely to positivistic or formalistic rules. Rather, wahkohtowin is a set of obligations which flows from one's role within his or her community.

== Origins ==
Understandings about wahkohtowin may have sacred origins, may come from positivistic rules, or may come from observations about the natural environment. Knowledge from these sources is then processed through deliberation, ceremony, and storytelling. Cree law lives on primarily through stories, which are among the most important references for Indigenous law.

== Features ==
The most recurrent theme within wahkohtowin is the circle. Wahkohtowin connotes interconnectedness, so circles are used as symbols to represent the way in which every element of a system is part of the whole. This reaffirms unity under the Creator and within the community, and represents the continuum of life. Wahkohtowin sometimes physically takes this form; for example, a community may gather in circles for prayer, discussion, and healing.

Cree law uses different circles as a visual way to conceptualize different legal principles; there are usually four elements or stages comprising a given circle. For example, the most foundational circle-metaphor describes the four kinds of human beings; when one understands one's identity in this circle, then one accepts the responsibilities which accompany that identity. Envisioned as a series of concentric circles, children (the most treasured and precious) are placed at the centre. Old ones are next; they are the keepers and teachers of knowledge and represent the past. Women, the nurturers and protectors, are third, and men, who are responsible for safety, constitute the outermost circle.

Another important circle metaphor in the Cree worldview represents one's personal identity. The innermost level represents the individual, followed by the family, the community, and the nation, respectively. In the Cree worldview, identity is inseparable from land, home, community, or family; these things together constitute a healthy wahkohtowin.

== Teaching ==
Sweat lodge ceremonies are important in the transmission of nehiyaw legal protocols and teachings, because they allow beauty to persuade participants of the importance of law.

An initiative in Saskatchewan proposed a Wahkohtowin classroom, which focused on discussing law from a grassroots perspective.
