= Norm (album) =

Studio album by Andy Shauf
- Released: February 10, 2023
- Length: 36:22
- Label: Anti-
- Producer: Andy Shauf

Andy Shauf chronology
Wilds (2021)	Norm (2023)

Norm is the ninth studio album by Canadian musician Andy Shauf. It was released on February 10, 2023, by Anti-.

== Background ==
After releasing concept albums such as 2016's The Party, 2020's The Neon Skyline, and 2021's Wilds, Shauf stated that he wanted to write "a normal album ... a collection of songs that aren't related to each other." As the album was being written, however, songs began to coalesce around a central character, Norm, who is revealed to be a stalker. Shauf has stated that in writing the album, he sought to leave more room for interpretation than his previous album; this decision was inspired by a misunderstanding when he didn't realize his computer screen had frozen for 10 minutes while watching Mulholland Drive.

While most of the songs are sung from the perspective of Norm, the album also has two other narrators – God, and a tow truck driver (implied to be an ex of the person Norm is stalking). The album focuses on the story of Norm becoming obsessed with, and eventually kidnapping, an unnamed character. By the end of the album, the perspectives of the three narrators and their similar misunderstandings of love are analogized. Shauf has stated: "The album is kind of 'What if God didn't understand what love was?'"

Critics have commented on the way in which the album's pleasant, mellow sound contrasts with the narrative, which Shauf has described as "sinister". Reviews have also noted the album's use of an unreliable narrator. Nicholas Olson, a friend of Shauf's who is a writer, worked as a story editor on the album.

== Release ==
Shauf originally announced the album in November 2022. At the same time, the first single, "Wasted on You", was released along with a music video, directed by V Haddad. Two other singles, both with music videos, followed: "Catch Your Eye" on December 12, and "Telephone" on January 24, 2023.

== Critical reception ==
Professional ratings
Aggregate scores
Source	Rating
Metacritic	79/100
Review scores
Source	Rating
AllMusic	4/5 stars
Exclaim!	9/10
Pitchfork	7.6/10

The album was longlisted for the 2023 Polaris Music Prize.

== Track listing ==
All tracks are written by Andy Shauf.

Norm track listing
No.	Title	Length
1.	"Wasted on You"	3:36
2.	"Catch Your Eye"	2:42
3.	"Telephone"	3:42
4.	"You Didn't See"	2:01
5.	"Paradise Cinema"	3:11
6.	"Norm"	3:09
7.	"Halloween Store"	2:59
8.	"Sunset"	3:23
9.	"Daylight Dreaming"	3:02
10.	"Long Throw"	3:24
11.	"Don't Let It Get to You"	3:26
12.	"All of My Love"	1:41
Total length:		36:22

== Personnel ==
- Andy Shauf – performance, recording
- Mike Bozzi – mastering
- Neal H Pogue – mixing
- Meghan Fenske – design, layout
- Nicolas Benjamin – photography
