= Foxwarren =

Foxwarren may refer to:

- Foxwarren Park, a country house and estate in Surrey, England
- Foxwarren, Manitoba, a community in Manitoba, Canada
- Foxwarren (band), a Canadian indie rock band
  - Foxwarren (album), the band's 2018 album
