= Angine de Poitrine =

Canadian rock duo

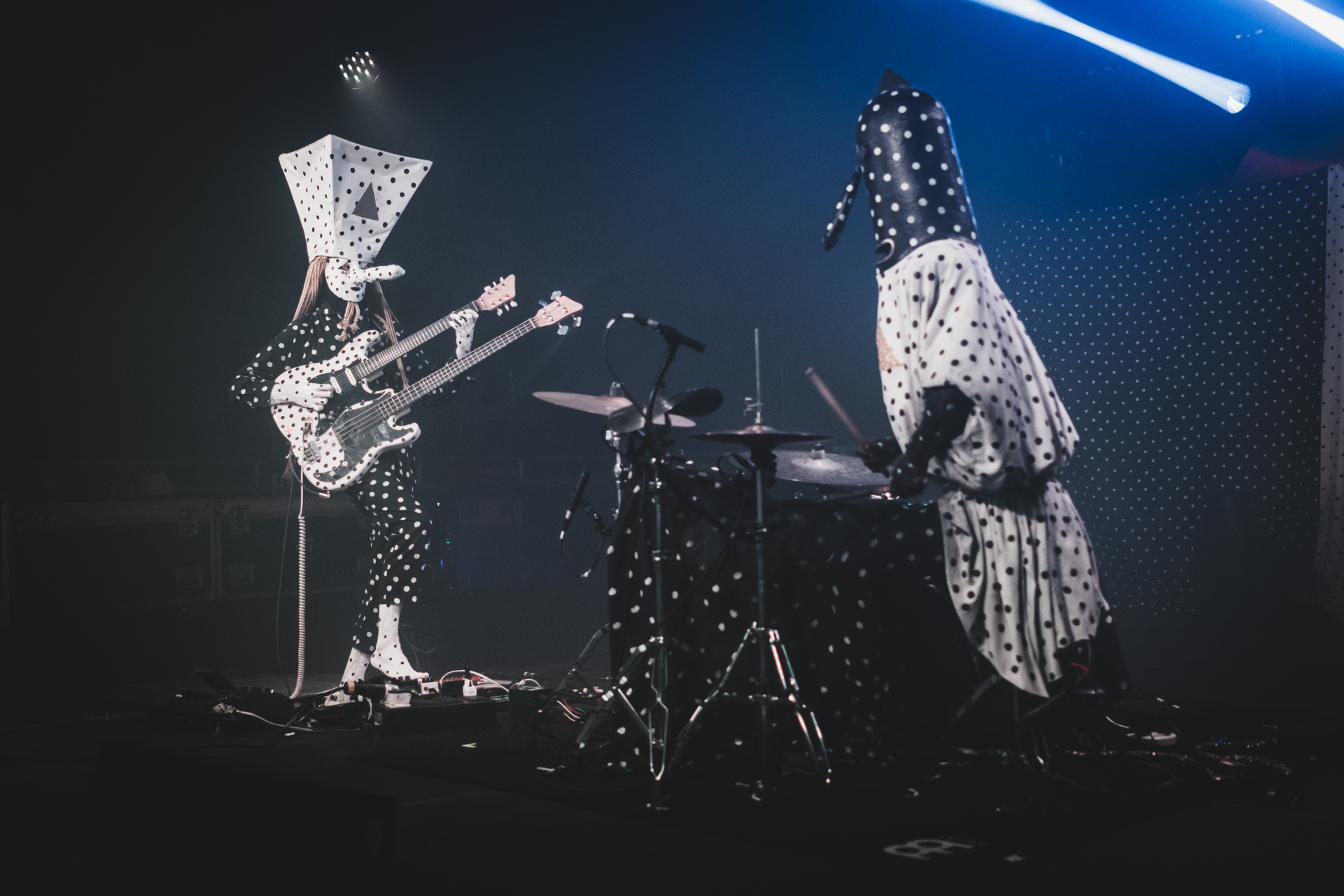
- Angine de Poitrine in 2026

Background information
- Origin: Saguenay, Quebec, Canada
- Genres: Math rock; experimental rock; progressive rock; psychedelic rock
- Years active: 2019–present
- Labels: Les Cassettes Magiques; Spectacles Bonzaï; ATO
- Awards: GAMIQ Artist of the Year 2025; 2026 Polaris Music Prize Album Prize for Vol. II; 2026 Polaris Music Prize Song Prize for "Fabienk"
- Members: Khn de Poitrine; Klek de Poitrine
- Website: anginedepoitrine.com

Angine de Poitrine (French: [ãʒɪn də pwatʁɪn] (Note: as heard on Tout le monde en parle; in European French: [ɑ̃ʒin də pwatʁin])) is a Canadian rock duo formed in Saguenay, Quebec, in 2019. The members are anonymous and perform under the pseudonyms Khn de Poitrine (guitar, bass) and Klek de Poitrine (drums). They perform complex microtonal compositions in the style of math rock and experimental rock, with an absurdist image involving oversized papier-mâché masks and black-and-white polka-dotted costumes.

Angine de Poitrine conceived the disguises to retain audiences across back-to-back sets at a local venue. Following their debut album, Vol. 1 (2024), they gained notice on the Quebec festival circuit and won Artist of the Year at the 2025 GAMIQ awards. They achieved viral recognition in February 2026 when a live session recorded for the US radio station KEXP accumulated millions of views. In 2026 they released their second album, Vol. II.

At the 2026 Polaris Music Prize, Vol. II won the album prize and the single "Fabienk" won the song prize. At the 2027 Grammy Awards, Angine de Poitrine was nominated for Best New Artist, Vol. II was nominated for Best Rock Album, and "Sarniezz" and "Fabienk" were nominated for Best Rock Performance and Best Alternative Music Performance.

== History ==
=== Origins (2019–2023) ===
Angine de Poitrine was formed in Saguenay, Quebec, in 2019. The group's name is the French term for angina pectoris ("angina [lit. strangling] of the chest"), and was initially suggested as a joke; this later became a reflection of the band's sound, characterized by the members as "dissonance-induced cardiac malfunction", and conveying a "sense of urgency" in their music. The duo performs anonymously as guitarist Khn de Poitrine and drummer Klek de Poitrine; the two are from La Baie borough and have been musical collaborators for two decades, having performed together in various projects since the age of 13.

The project began as a gag after the pair were booked to perform twice in one week at the same local Saguenay venue; concerned that audiences would not attend the second show, they decided to play the latter set as anonymous, costumed performers under a different name. To complete what the duo later likened to an "Andy Kaufman-esque joke", they constructed oversized papier-mâché masks with giant noses and full-body black-and-white polka-dotted costumes. During the COVID-19 pandemic lockdowns, with live opportunities limited, the members took up construction jobs.

=== Vol. 1, breakthrough and Vol. II (2024–present) ===
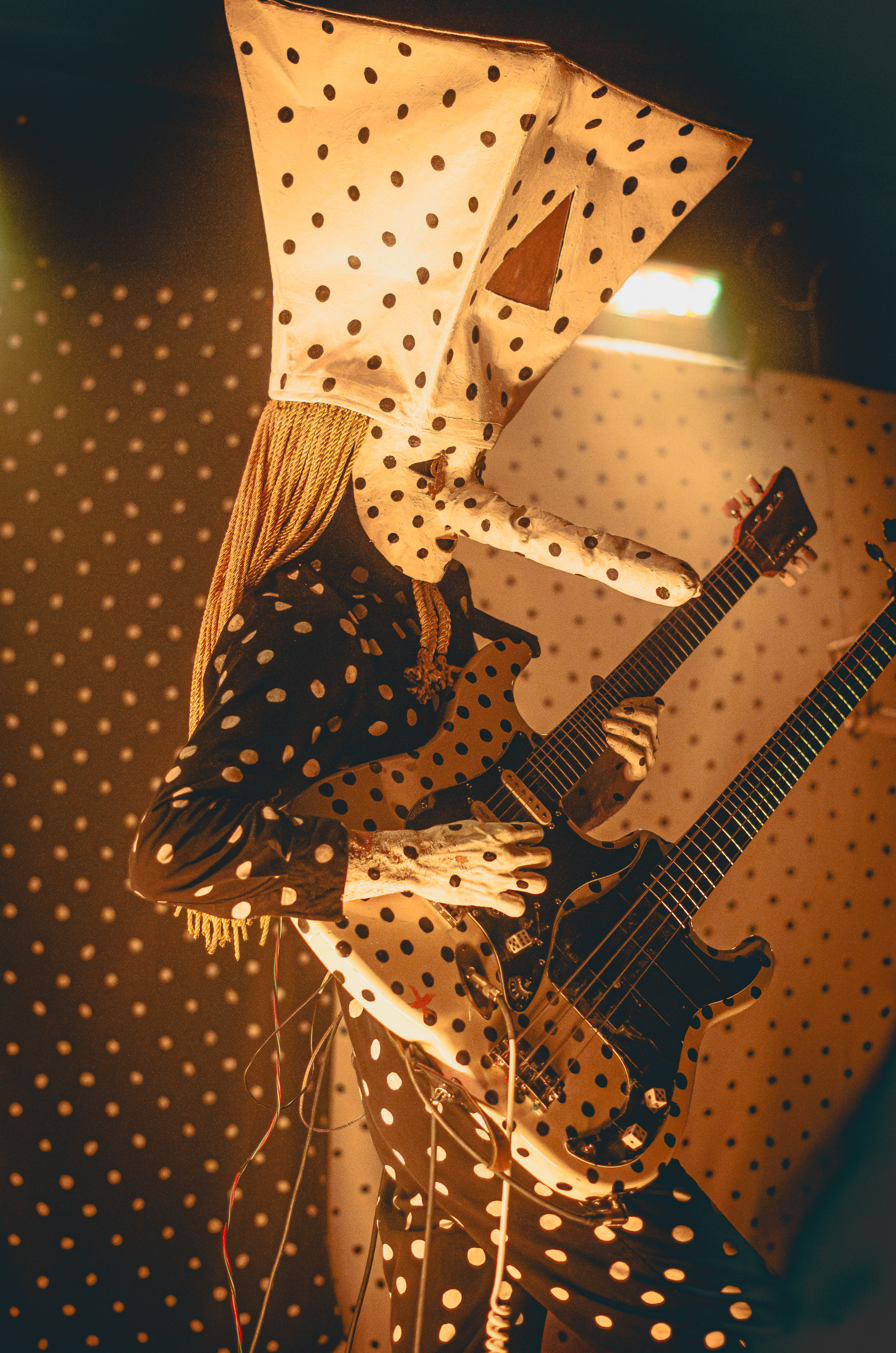

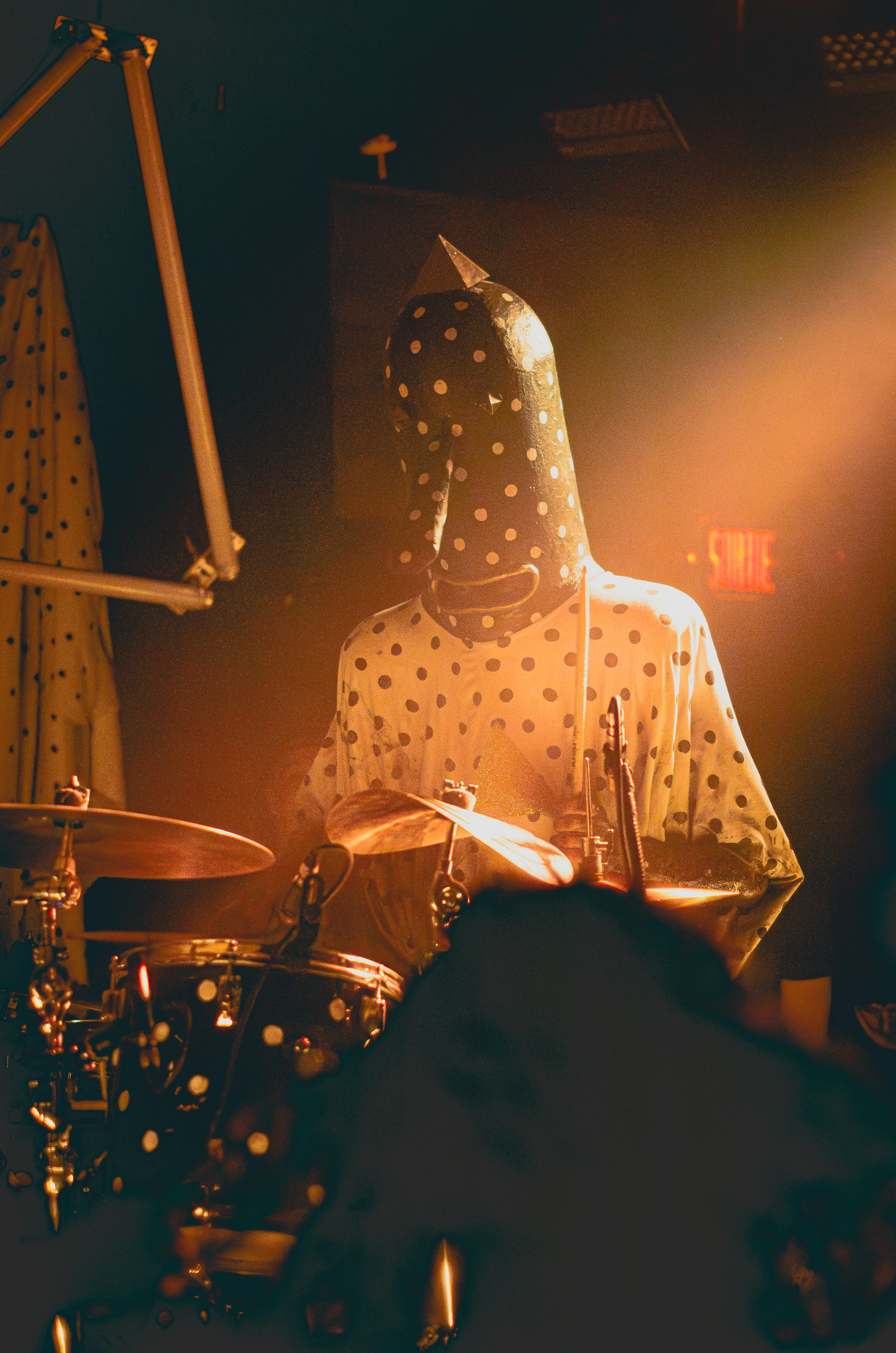
Khn de Poitrine (top) and Klek de Poitrine in April 2026

On 14 June 2024, Angine de Poitrine released their debut album, Vol. 1. Throughout 2025, they attracted increasing attention on the Quebec festival circuit, including appearances at Le Festif!, M for Montreal, the Montreal Jazz Festival and Pop Montreal. In December 2025, they won "Artist of the Year" at the 20th annual GAMIQ awards. That month, they performed at Trans Musicales in Rennes, France; footage from the set was released by the Seattle radio station KEXP on 5 February 2026. The video became an immediate viral success, accumulating over two million views within its first week, and over 16 million views as of June. The band released their second studio album, Vol. II, on 3 April.

In March 2026, Angine de Poitrine appeared on the Quebec talk show Tout le monde en parle, which averages nearly one million viewers. During an interview for the Logan Sounds Off podcast, the Foo Fighters frontman Dave Grohl said they "absolutely blew [his] mind" and described them as "completely bonkers". Sean Lennon wrote on Twitter: "I have never seen a weird instrumental band go viral like Angine de Poitrine. I've never seen anything like it. It's totally wild. For the last three months, everyone I know has sent me their video at least once."

Following the viral success of their KEXP session, Angine de Poitrine embarked on an international tour. It began on 28 March 2026 at the Tremor Festival in the Azores, Portugal, preceding a sold-out April and May leg across Quebec. In April, the duo secured physical media distribution rights outside of Quebec, with ATO Records releasing their music in the United States, F>A>B in the rest of Canada, and Republic of Music in Europe. On 27 June, the band played a free show at the Montreal International Jazz Festival, drawing an estimated crowd of 70,000. Angine de Poitrine performed their first concert in the United States at the Newport Jazz Festival in Newport, Rhode Island on 31 July 2026.

On 14 September 2026, Angine de Poitrine made their US television debut on The Tonight Show Starring Jimmy Fallon, following their first two shows in New York City the previous week. They played an unreleased song, "Zugzegk". During a show in Toronto on 5 November, an unidentified third member played triangle on an unreleased song. They were later revealed to be named Kakling de Poitrine, and that the Toronto show would be their first appearance.

== Artistry ==
Angine de Poitrine's musical style has been described as math rock and experimental rock, with additional influences from microtonal music, psychedelic rock, and progressive rock. The group describes itself as a "mantra-rock Dada Pythago-Cubist orchestra" composed of "space-time voyagers", reflecting their fusion of technical complexity, hypnotic repetition, and absurdist aesthetics. The band has cited a wide range of musical influences, with individual artists including King Gizzard & the Lizard Wizard, Frank Zappa, Leo Brouwer, John Scofield, and Gentle Giant.

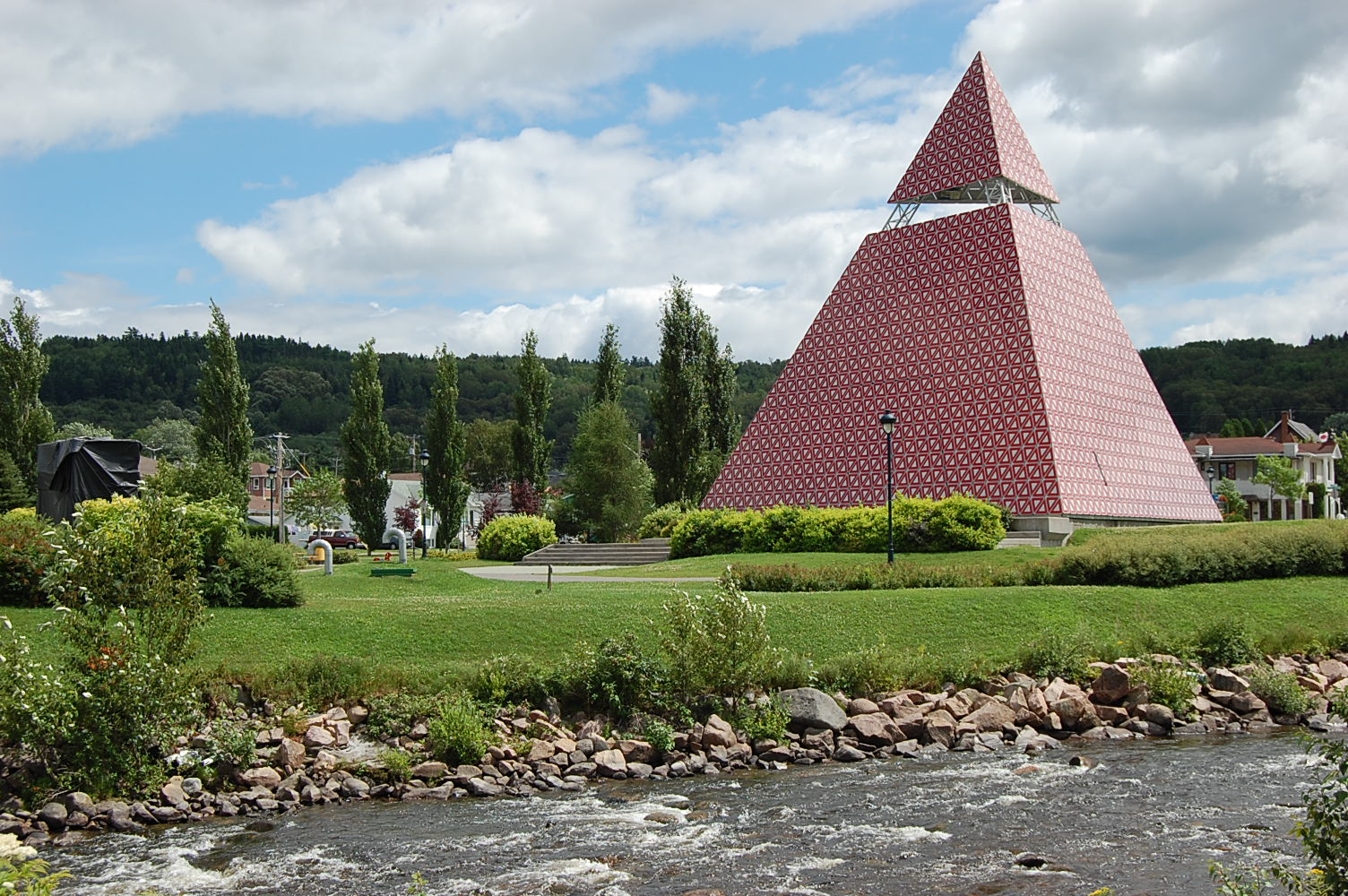
Ha! Ha! Pyramid in Saguenay, Quebec

The band employs complex rhythms, and largely instrumental compositions. Their live performances feature the musicians performing in oversized papier-mâché masks with proboscis monkey-like noses alongside black and white polka dot stylized costumes and staging. The idea for using papier-mâché came from the duo's previous band, which would use the material to make large structures designed to be destroyed by the audience "like a huge-ass piñata", according to Klek. The band's music includes vocals only sparsely, and the ones that are there are distorted and difficult to understand. In between songs during live performances they do not speak to the audience. Instead, they perform gestures to each other in a ritualistic manner – most notably forming a triangle shape with their hands, which the audience will often do in tandem. The use of triangles and pyramids in their imagery may be inspired by the Ha! Ha! Pyramid in their home city of Saguenay, Quebec.

In early performances, Khn de Poitrine played both a guitar and a bass simultaneously, using a modified guitar fitted with microtonal frets. In 2023, Khn commissioned a custom double-necked hybrid instrument consisting of a Fender-Stratocaster-like guitar and bass, separately wired, and each with additional microtonal frets from Saguenay-based luthier Raphaël Le Breton. The project required more than three months of preparation and reportedly over 150 hours of craftsmanship to complete. The instrument includes oversized, phosphorescent fret markers on the side and top of the necks to compensate for Khn's impaired vision due to the mask. A second backup instrument for upcoming tours is planned.

== Reception ==
In March 2026, their appearance on the Quebec television program Tout le monde en parle generated significant media coverage and a strong reaction on social media, particularly due to their use of an invented language during the interview. Several businesses, especially in the group's home region, adopted Angine de Poitrine's aesthetic in their social media posts following their appearance on the show. The group members, who wish to remain anonymous, also noted a surge of interest online, with some seeking to discover their identities or contact them.

On 3 April 2026, the New York Times critic Jon Pareles wrote: "Angine de Poitrine have taken the internet by storm this year ... The group perfectly masters the power of rhythm, repetition, dissonance, surprise, and noise, and presents them in a whimsical package." In a context marked by the rise of AI-generated music, favourable reviews highlight the duo's music as being perceived as distinctly human. The journalist Emilie Hanskamp wrote: "As AI becomes more sophisticated and it becomes harder to distinguish between works created by humans and those that are not, people find immediate comfort and resonance in art that is undeniably human."

Angine de Poitrine was also recognized by the Canadian producer and DJ Deadmau5, who showed a preview of a remix of the song "Fabienk" on his Instagram on 12 April 2026.. Deadmau5 played the remix during some of his live sets, most notably at the Calgary Stampede and at the FIFA Fan Festival in Philadelphia, both in July of 2026. He also later attended a live show at Mod Club in Toronto on 14 July 2026. The song was eventually released to streaming platforms as the single "Fabienk (deadmau5 remake)" on 14 August 2026.

=== Accolades ===
On 22 September, Angine de Poitrine won the Album Prize (for Vol. II) and the Song Prize (for "Fabienk") at the 2026 Polaris Music Prize, becoming the first act to earn both prizes at once. "Yor Zarad" was also longlisted for the Song Prize, but did not make the shortlist.

In November 2026, Angine de Poitrine won a total of nine of the ADISQ's Félix awards, including Rock Album of the Year and Group or Duo of the Year. Vol. II was nominated for Best Rock Album in the 2027 Grammy Awards, while "Sarniezz" was nominated for Best Rock Performance and "Fabienk" for Best Alternative Music Performance. The band itself was nominated for Best New Artist.

== Members ==
- Khn de Poitrine – microtonal guitars, microtonal bass guitar, loop station, vocals
- Klek de Poitrine – drums, vocals
- Kakling de Poitrine - triangle

== Discography ==
=== Studio albums ===
Title	Details	Peak chart positions						
Title	Details	CAN	AUS	GER	NLD	SWE	UK	US
Vol. 1	Released: 14 June 2024; Label: Independent; Format: LP, cassette, streaming, digital download, CD	—	40	4	38	19	23	53
Vol. II	Released: 3 April 2026; Label: Spectacles Bonzaï (under exclusive licence); Format: LP, streaming, digital download, CD	11	21	3	31	13	19	44

=== Singles ===
Title	Details
"Sherpa"	Released: 1 June 2024; Label: self-released; Format: streaming, digital download
"Sherpa V. Alt" / "Sarniez V. Beta"	Released: February 2025; Label: Self-released; Format: LP
"Mata Zyklek"	Released: 28 November 2025; Label: self-released; Format: streaming, digital download
"Fabienk"	Released: 5 February 2026; Label: self-released; Format: streaming, digital download

=== Music videos ===
List of music videos, showing year released and director
Title	Year	Director(s)
"Sherpa"	2024	Fabien Peterson
"Sahardnieh"	2024	Fabien Peterson
