= Vol. II (Angine de Poitrine album) =

Studio album by Angine de Poitrine
- Released: 3 April 2026
- Genres: Math rock; progressive rock
- Length: 36:50
- Label: Spectacles Bonzaï

Angine de Poitrine chronology
Vol. 1 (2024)	Vol. II (2026)

Singles from Vol. II
- 1. "Mata Zyklek" Released: 28 November 2025; 2. "Fabienk" Released: 5 February 2026

Vol. II is the second studio album by the Canadian rock group Angine de Poitrine, released on 3 April 2026 through Spectacles Bonzaï. The primarily instrumental album combines progressive and math rock with danceable melodies and rhythms. The album was the band's first release following the viral popularity of a four-song set recorded for the Seattle-based radio station KEXP in 2025.

The album received acclaim from critics, with Pitchfork writing that the band "managed to take some of the unsexiest music in history and give it the type of groove that renders it undeniable". The album was awarded the 2026 Polaris Music Prize, and the single "Fabienk" won the SOCAN Polaris Song Prize the same year.

Vol. II was nominated for Best Rock Album in the 2027 Grammy Awards, while "Sarniezz" was nominated for Best Rock Performance and "Fabienk" for Best Alternative Music Performance.

== Background and release ==
Angine de Poitrine formed in Saguenay, Quebec, in 2019. The duo had known each other since they were teenagers. The band is anonymous; in what they have described as an "Andy Kaufman-esque joke", they perform in oversized papier-mâché masks with giant noses and full-body black-and-white polka-dotted costumes.

In 2024 they released their first studio album, Vol. I. The band recorded a four-song set for the Seattle-based radio station KEXP in 2025, which achieved viral popularity and has amassed millions of views. They were named artist of the year by GAMIQ, and having hired an international booking agent, established a 2026 tour spanning concerts and festivals in North America and Europe.

Vol. II was released on 3 April 2026. It consists of six songs, three of which were part of the band's KEXP performance, including the single "Fabienk". Initially a digital-only release, it was later announced that both Vol. II and the band's first album Vol. 1 would receive a wider, international release on vinyl and CD in June 2026, with ATO Records handling the release in the United States.

== Critical reception ==
Professional ratings
Aggregate scores
Source	Rating
AnyDecentMusic?	8.4/10
Metacritic	83/100
Review scores
Source	Rating
AllMusic	4/5 stars
Clash	8/10
Exclaim!	10/10
Far Out	4.5/5 stars
The Line of Best Fit	8/10
Northern Transmissions	8.4/10
Paste	B+
Pitchfork	8/10
Sputnikmusic	4.7/5
Uncut	3.5/5 stars

According to the review aggregator Metacritic, Vol. II received "universal acclaim" based on a weighted average score of 83 out of 100 from ten critic scores. The review aggregator Any Decent Music gave the album a weighted average score of 8.4 out of 10 from nine critic scores.

Vol. II received an 8.0 score from Pitchfork, whose Christopher R. Weingarten remarked at the band's popularity despite being comparable to music that is not "remotely fashionable". He wrote that the math rock tendencies of the songs should be off-putting to those who are not fans of that genre, but that their best attribute is being able to "dance this mess around".

Exclaim! gave the album a perfect 10 score – the first perfect score given by the publication since 2023 – and called it "magnetic and serpentine, yet surprisingly manageable". Reviewer Marko Djurdjić acknowledges the gimmickry of the band's style and quirks, but points out that gimmicks have long been a part of rock music, continuing: "Of course it's pretentious and performative, but it also lacks cynicism and hopelessness, and that's something we can all use a bit more of." Writing for The New York Times, Jon Pareles called the album's songs "tightly wound" and termed it "music of precision, agility and stamina, adding up to a contagious manic energy", while Casey Epstein-Gross wrote for Paste that "never before has technical mastery sounded so fun".

James Kilkenny, the reviewer for Clash, believed the album a significant improvement over Vol. I, and wrote that the album "proves that [the band is] far more than a whimsical gimmick". He praised the group's ability to oscillate between maximalist bombast and a "lustrous miniature orchestra", and termed the album "an addictive, clever, and primal magnum opus". Writing for Louder Than War, MK Bennett praised the album as being "almost supernaturally entertaining", and compared the band to both Frank Zappa and Marcel Duchamp.

On June 24, 2026, Complex Canada ranked Vol. II atop of their 10 Best Canadian Albums of 2026 (So Far) list.

=== Accolades ===
The album was shortlisted for the 2026 Polaris Music Prize, Further, the songs "Fabienk" and "Yor Zarad" were longlisted for the SOCAN Polaris Song Prize, with "Fabienk" making the final shortlist. Vol. II went on to win the 2026 Polaris Music Prize on September 22, and "Fabienk" won the SOCAN Polaris Song Prize.

On November 4, 2026, Vol. II won Album of the Year in the rock category as well as the Critics' Choice Award for Album of the Year at the Industry Gala of the 2026 ADISQ Awards.

== Track listing ==
All tracks are written by Khn and Klek de Poitrine.

No.	Title	Length
1.	"Fabienk"	6:31
2.	"Mata Zyklek"	6:09
3.	"Sarniezz"	4:35
4.	"Utzp"	6:50
5.	"Yor Zarad"	6:29
6.	"Angor"	6:16
Total length:		36:50

== Personnel ==
- Khn de Poitrine – microtonal guitars, microtonal bass guitar, loop station, vocals
- Klek de Poitrine – drums, vocals
- Glegg De Poitrine – sound recording
- Tek De Poitrine – mixing, mastering
- Arielle Corbeau – cover artwork

== Charts ==
Chart performance for Vol. II
Chart (2026)	Peak position
Australian Albums (ARIA)	21
Austrian Albums (Ö3 Austria)	7
Belgian Albums (Ultratop Flanders)	6
Belgian Albums (Ultratop Wallonia)	8
Canadian Albums (Billboard)	11
Croatian International Albums (HDU)	7
Dutch Albums (Album Top 100)	31
Finnish Albums (Suomen virallinen lista)	7
French Albums (SNEP)	53
French Rock & Metal Albums (SNEP)	22
German Albums (Offizielle Top 100)	3
German Rock & Metal Albums (Offizielle Top 100)	2
Irish Independent Albums (IRMA)	5
Italian Albums (FIMI)	73
Japanese Albums (Oricon)	46
Japanese Digital Albums (Oricon)	8
Japanese Download Albums (Billboard Japan)	6
Japanese Rock Albums (Oricon)	7
Norwegian Albums (IFPI Norge)	97
Norwegian Rock Albums (IFPI Norge)	7
Portuguese Albums (AFP)	118
Scottish Albums (Official Charts)	2
Swedish Albums (Sverigetopplistan)	13
Swiss Albums (Schweizer Hitparade)	2
UK Albums (Official Charts)	19
UK Independent Albums (Official Charts)	2
UK Rock & Metal Albums (Official Charts)	1
US Billboard 200	44
US Top Dance Albums (Billboard)	2
US Top Rock & Alternative Albums (Billboard)	12
