= Ha! Ha! Pyramid =

Art monument in Quebec

- Pyramide des Ha! Ha!
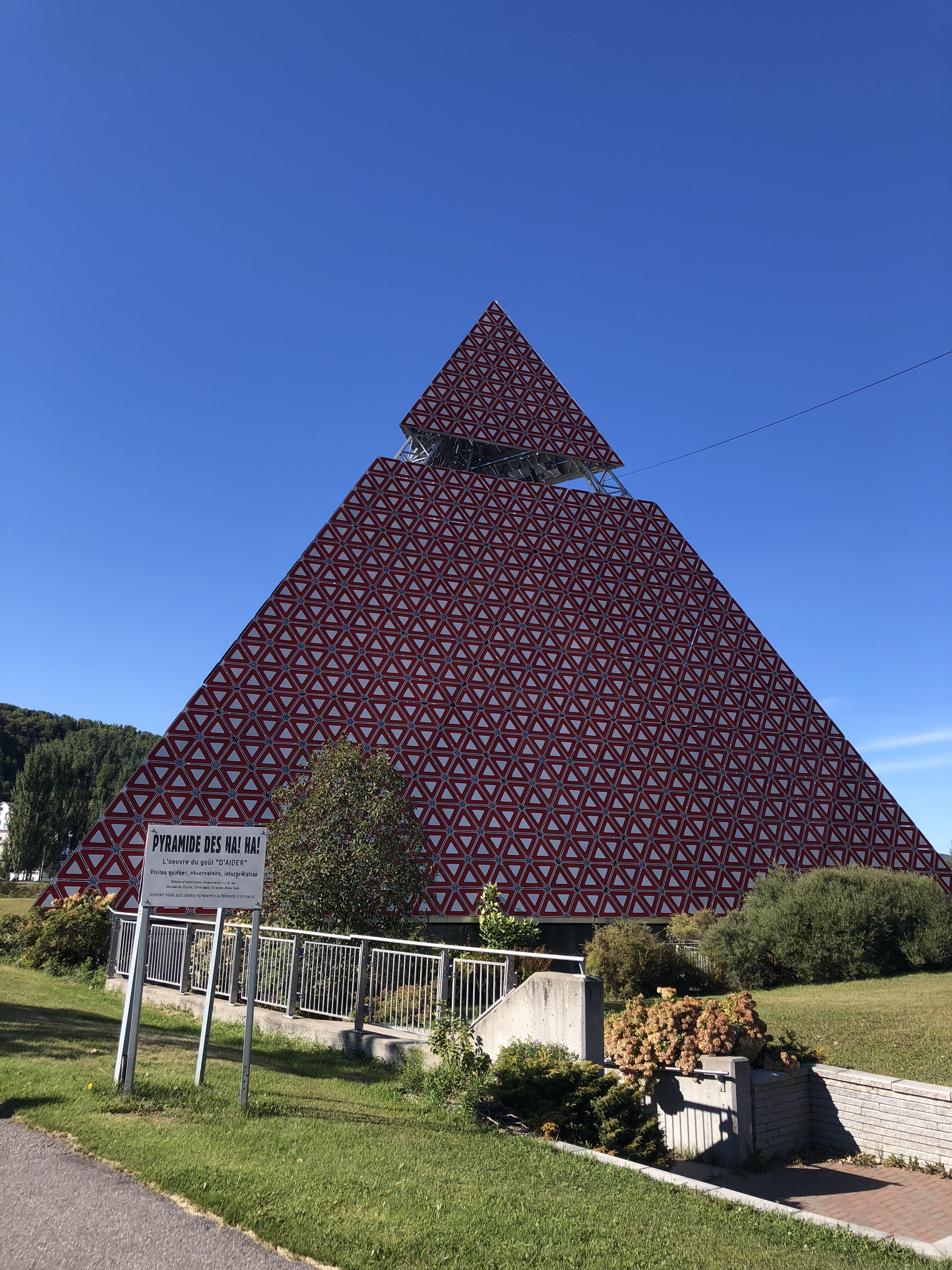
- The pyramid in September 2018
- Interactive map of Ha! Ha! Pyramid
- Location: La Baie, Quebec, Canada
- Coordinates: 48°18′56″N 70°51′30″W
- Designer: Jean-Jules Soucy
- Type: Pyramid
- Height: 21 metres (69 ft)
- Beginning date: 1997
- Completion date: 1998
- Dedicated to: Victims of the Saguenay flood

The Ha! Ha! Pyramid (French: Pyramide des Ha! Ha!) is a contemporary art monument commemorating the Saguenay flood of 1996. Located in the district of La Baie in Saguenay, Quebec, the pyramid was named after the nearby Ha! Ha! River. Conceived as a form of therapy to help residents recover from the traumatic events of the flood, it is covered in 3,000 yield signs, based on the similarity of pronunciation of the French words for "to yield" (céder [se.de]) and "to help each other" (s'aider [sɛ.de]).

== History ==
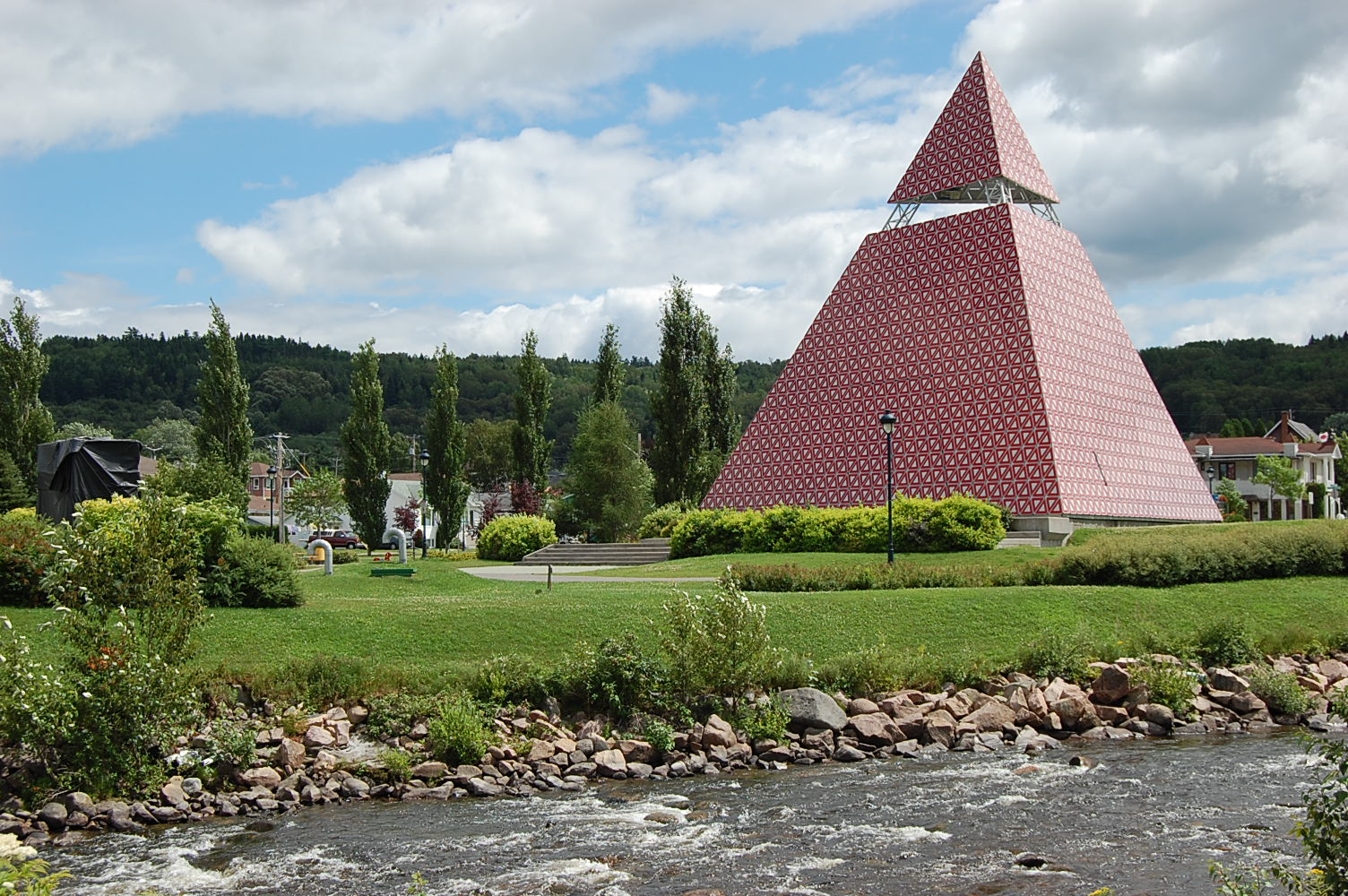
The pyramid in 2008

The area of Grande-Baie suffered heavy damage from the flood of 1996. Ten people died, and between 12,000 and 16,000 residents were displaced. Some 500 to 800 buildings were destroyed, more than 1,200 damaged, and damage estimates ranged from CA$300–700 million.

The project was therefore seen as a form of therapy to help residents recover from the traumatic events of the flood, and to revitalise the area by adding a new tourist and artistic attraction. A group of local citizens formed The Restoration Committee of Ha! Ha!, put forward the idea for a new art installation, and requested help from local artist Jean-Jules Soucy. Soucy submitted a contemporary design that would express both "originality and a sense of humor".

The project called for the full restoration of the Ha! Ha! River, on whose banks the project is situated, and the construction of a new public park in the area where a bridge once stood, which would contain the 21 metres (69 ft) high pyramid and an area for public performances.

The project was estimated to cost $2 million, and was completed in several stages. The Ha! Ha! park was completed in 1998 for a total of $1.3 million, and was officially inaugurated during the 2000 Festival of Lac-Saint-Jean. Financing was achieved through a public–private partnership, including a fundraising campaign that netted $300,000. Finally, in 2005, a public square was completed next to the project at a cost of $35,000.

== Description ==
The pyramid is a 21-metre-high (69 ft) aluminum structure covered in 3,000 yield signs with standard reflective coating. The design of the signs were noted by Soucy to be similar to the Greek delta (Δ). The signs are meant to encourage people to help one another, as the French word for "yield", céder, is pronounced the same as s'aider, meaning "to help each other".

A central staircase provides access to an observation deck which allows views of the Haha portion of the surrounding Saguenay River valley. On the pyramid's interior walls there are a number of plaques dedicated to local families engraved with the names of those who were directly affected by the flood.

== Recognition ==
In 2007, the pyramid was one of three finalists for the "new development prize" from Les Arts et la Ville, a nonprofit organisation that supports the artistic and cultural life of smaller municipalities.

The Canadian yield sign

The musical group Angine de Poitrine uses pyramids on their costumes and musical equipment as reference to the pyramid.

== See also ==
- Saguenay flood
- Canadian contemporary art
- Lists of pyramids
