= Bugland =

Studio album by No Joy
- Released: August 8, 2025
- Studios: Angel Hair; Bugland; Autoland
- Genre: Shoegaze
- Length: 33:39
- Labels: Hand Drawn Dracula; Sonic Cathedral
- Producers: No Joy; Fire-Toolz

No Joy chronology
Motherhood (2020)	Bugland (2025)

Singles from Bugland
- 1. "Bugland" Released: May 14, 2025; 2. "Bits" Released: June 26, 2025; 3. "My Crud Princess" Released: July 24, 2025

Bugland is the fifth studio album by Canadian project No Joy. It was released on August 8, 2025, through Hand Drawn Dracula (ROW) and Sonic Cathedral (EU/UK). The album received acclaim from critics.

The album was longlisted for the 2026 Polaris Music Prize.

== Background and singles ==
Bugland marks White-Gluz's first full-length as No Joy since 2020's Motherhood. White-Gluz co-produced the album with Chicago experimentalist Angel Marcloid, better known by her pseudonym Fire-Toolz. She described the collaboration as "limitless" and said it allowed her to "easily relate" to the project, as both share a similar taste in music. The album announcement on May 14, 2025, was accompanied by the release of the title track, which marked the first song the duo produced together. The second single "Bits" was released on June 26, followed by "My Crud Princess" on July 24.

== Critical reception ==
Professional ratings
Aggregate scores
Source	Rating
Metacritic	85/100
Review scores
Source	Rating
AllMusic	4.5/5 stars
Far Out	3.5/5 stars
Laut.de	4/5 stars
Pitchfork	8.3/10

On Metacritic, which assigns a normalized score out of 100 to ratings from mainstream publications, the album received a weighted mean score of 85 based on four reviews, indicating "universal acclaim". Sadie Sartini Garner of Pitchfork awarded Bugland the accolade Best New Music, noting that the album is fully aware of "living in a memory" and calling it the "perfect album for our current shoecraze" as well as "unlike any other record alongside". She described it as containing a "litter of sound", with "so much happening" at the same time that nearly all of it "commands your attention".

Kerstin Kratochwill of Laut.de described the album as "heavy" and comparable to noise acts such as Medicine and My Bloody Valentine. She noted that it evokes a desire to be fully immersed in its "futuristic sonic force", which expands into space with influences from jam music and black metal. In a more moderate review, Kelly Scanlon of Far Out acknowledged that there were "definitely low points throughout the album" but praised it as "a tight embrace" that encourages listeners to keep going "even when the haze becomes a bit too much".

== Track listing ==
All tracks are written by Jasamine White-Gluz; additional lyrics on "Jelly Meadow Bright" written by Angel Marcloid.

Bugland track listing
No.	Title	Length
1.	"Garbage Dream House"	5:16
2.	"Bugland"	2:29
3.	"Bits"	3:38
4.	"Save the Lobsters"	4:46
5.	"My Crud Princess"	3:14
6.	"Bather in the Bloodcells"	2:55
7.	"I Hate That I Forget What You Look Like"	3:30
8.	"Jelly Meadow Bright" (featuring Fire-Toolz)	7:51
Total length:		33:39

== Personnel ==
Credits are adapted from the album's liner notes.

- Jasamine White-Gluz – vocals, guitar, bass, synthesizers, piano, production
- Angel Marcloid – guitar, keyboards, VST drums, miscellaneous electronics, bass, production, mixing (all tracks); vocals (track 8)
- Heba Kadry – mastering
- Tara McLeod – guitar, banjo (1, 3, 5, 8)
- Lana Cooney – drums (3–6)
- Garland Hastings – drums (1, 7)
- Casey Scheibling – bass (3–6)
- Morgan Greenwood – additional production (all tracks); guitar, miscellaneous electronics (4)
- Josh Plotner – saxophone (8)
- Mathieu Fortin – photography
- Jeremy Dabrowski – packaging
- Michael Hahn – additional engineering
- Ben Needham – additional engineering
