= T. Buckley =

- Born: Tim Buckley; Calgary, Alberta
- Genres: Country
- Occupation: Singer/songwriter

T. Buckley is the professional name of Canadian singer/songwriter Tim Buckley, who is based in Calgary, Alberta. He has recorded five studio albums of country music. In 2018 he leads the T. Buckley Trio. He is the older brother of singer-songwriter Mariel Buckley.

== Early life ==
Buckley was born and grew up in Calgary. He uses the initial T., rather than his full given name, in his musical career because of American singer-songwriter Tim Buckley, to whom he is not related.

== Career ==
Buckley released his first album of country music, Roll On, in 2011.

In 2012 Buckley performed on CBC Radio Alberta as part of their celebration of the Centennial Calgary Stampede. In 2013 Buckley performed at the Bow Valley Music Club Festival and contributed a song to the festival's annual compilation album, Look Out, Kansas City. Buckley formed a band, the T. Buckley Trio, with steel guitarist Tim Leacock and upright bassist Derek Pulliam; in 2013 the trio released an album, Northern Country Soul, and the following year the three recorded another album, Nowhere Fast, in Banff.

In 2014 Buckley was a finalist in the All-Alberta Songwriting Contest. For a time he was a resident singer-songwriter at the Banff Centre. In 2016 the T. Buckley Trio performed regularly in Calgary.

In 2018 Buckley released his fifth album, Miles We Put Behind, which was recorded in Montreal at Howard Bilerman's hotel2tango recording studio. He toured around Alberta in support of the album, sometimes performing with his sister.

In December 2022, Buckley and his sister released a cover The Tragically Hip's "Bobcaygeon" as a single. The two have also continued to perform together as a duo at other times, performing a set that includes duet versions of their own songs as well as covers of material by other artists.

He has also performed with John Wort Hannam in a duo called The Woodshed.

== Discography ==
- Roll On (2011)
- Northern Country Soul (2013)
- Nowhere Fast (2014)
- Miles We Put Behind (2018)
- Frame by Frame (2021)
