= Andy Shauf =

Canadian singer-songwriter

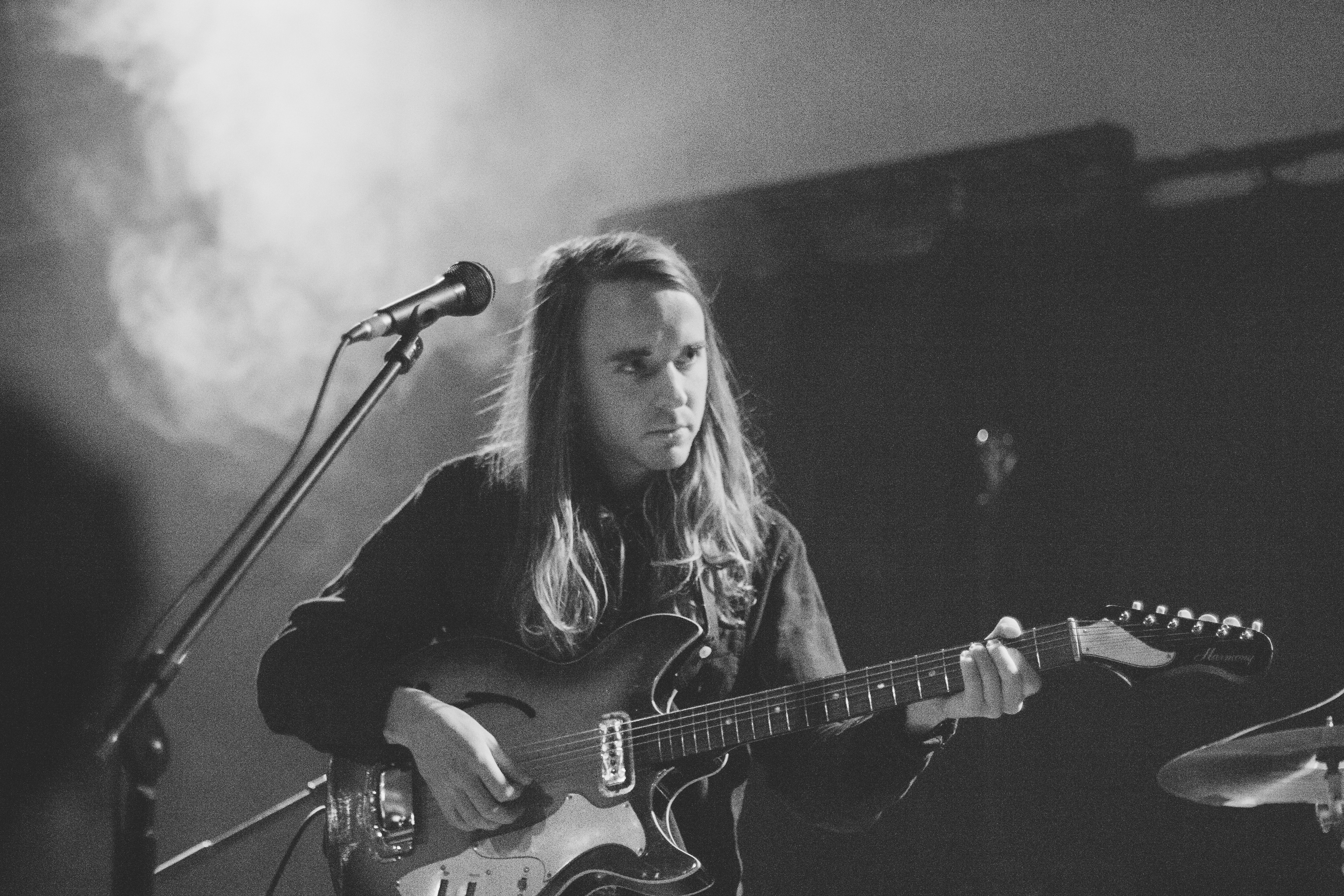
- Shauf performing on stage

Background information
- Born: 21 June 1986 (age 40); Estevan, Saskatchewan
- Origin: Regina, Saskatchewan, Canada
- Genres: Indie pop; folk rock; baroque pop; jazz rock
- Occupation: Singer-songwriter
- Instruments: Guitar; drums; clarinet
- Years active: 2000s–present
- Labels: Arts & Crafts, ANTI-
- Website: Andyshauf.com

Andy Shauf (born 21 June 1986) is a Canadian singer-songwriter from Regina, Saskatchewan, who records and performs both as a solo artist and as lead singer of the indie rock band Foxwarren. He plays several instruments, including guitar, drums, and clarinet.

== Early life ==
Shauf was born in Estevan, Saskatchewan, grew up in Bienfait, and later moved to Regina. His parents ran an electronics and music store, giving him access to a variety of instruments. He played Christian music with his parents and was a drummer in the Christian pop punk band Captain until 2006.

== Career ==
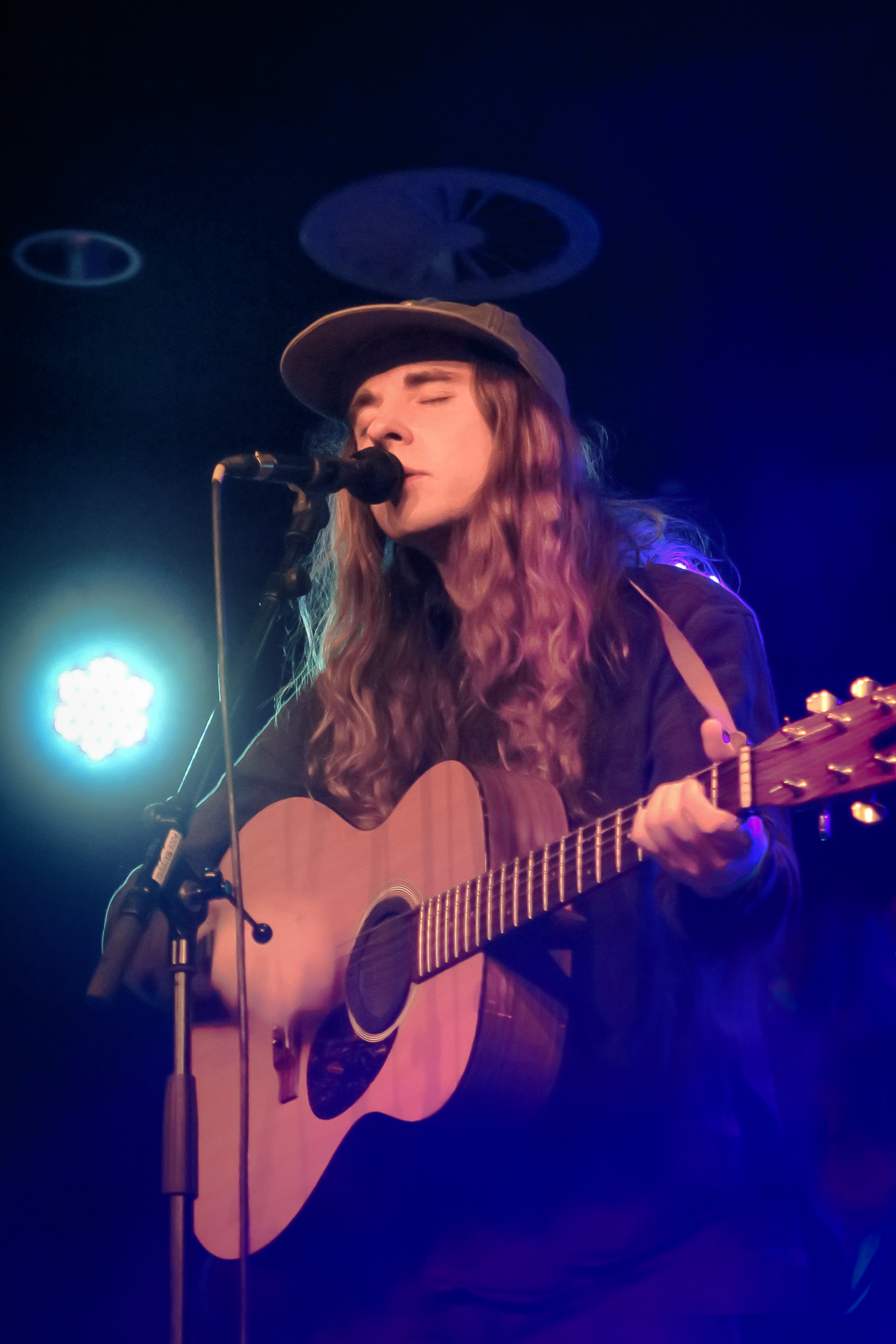
Shauf performing in Belgium, 2018

After two self-released albums in 2006 and 2007 respectively, Shauf released two albums on Hopeless Records: Darker Days (2009) and Waiting for the Sun to Leave (2010). These were followed by the self-released EP Sam Jones Feeds His Demons (2012).

He released the album The Bearer of Bad News independently in 2012. The album was re-released in 2015 on Tender Loving Empire and Party Damage Records. The song "Wendell Walker" from the album was shortlisted for the 2016 SOCAN Songwriting Prize.

In 2015, Shauf signed to Arts & Crafts Productions in Canada and ANTI- internationally, releasing the non-album single "Jenny Come Home" as his first release on both labels. "Jenny Come Home" was Shauf's breakthrough on Canadian radio, charting on both CBC Radio 2's Radio 2 Top 20 and CBC Radio 3.

Through early 2016, he toured Europe as an opening act for the Lumineers, and he moved from Saskatchewan to Toronto in April that year.

Shauf's album The Party was released in May 2016. After some experimental recordings with a group of musicians, Shauf ended up playing almost all of the instruments on the album himself, with the exception of the string arrangements, which were written and performed by Colin Nealis. The album was a shortlisted finalist for the 2016 Polaris Music Prize and has since been noted by some as the first album to win Shauf widespread recognition. Following the album's release, Shauf toured throughout 2017 with a five-piece band.

In 2018, Shauf released an album with D. A. Kissick, Avery Kissick and Dallas Bryson, under the band name Foxwarren. The self-titled album was released on 30 November 2018 and received a Juno Award nomination for Alternative Album of the Year at the Juno Awards of 2020.

On 23 October 2019, Shauf announced that a new album, The Neon Skyline, would be released 24 January 2020. A single, "Things I Do", was released the same day. After the release of The Neon Skyline, Barack Obama featured the title track on his 2020 summer playlist. Commenting on this honor, Shauf stated, "It’s cool to think that Obama, or the Obamas together, have listened to my music. It’s a really nice feeling to think my music has gone that far."

On 24 September 2021, Shauf released the album Wilds, a collection nine songs written and recorded at the same time as The Neon Skyline and described as a "companion piece" to it.

On 10 February 2023, Shauf released Norm. The concept album follows a stalker. The album was longlisted for the 2023 Polaris Music Prize.

In May 2025, Foxwarren released the album 2.

== Discography ==
=== Albums ===
List of albums, with selected chart positions
Title	Album details	Peak chart positions	
Title	Album details	CAN	US Heat
Love and the Memories of It	Released: 2006; Label: self-released	—	—
Grandpa Songs	Released: 2007; Label: self-released	—	—
Darker Days	Released: 19 May 2009; Label: Hopeless	—	—
Waiting for the Sun to Leave	Released: 18 September 2010; Label: Hopeless	—	—
The Bearer of Bad News	Released: 2012; Re-released: 30 January 2015; Label: TLE	—	—
The Party	Released: 20 May 2016; Label: Anti-	—	—
The Neon Skyline	Released: 24 January 2020; Label: Anti-	91	23
Wilds	Released: 24 September 2021; Label: Anti-	—	—
Norm	Released: 10 February 2023; Label: Anti-	—	—
"—" denotes a recording that did not chart or was not released in that territory.

=== EPs ===
- Tour EP (2009)
- Four Songs (2009)
- Sam Jones Feeds His Demons (2012)

=== with Foxwarren ===
- Has Been Defeated (2011)
- Foxwarren (2018)
- 2 (2025)

== Awards and nominations ==
Year	Award	Category	Nominee/Work	Result	Ref
2013	Western Canadian Music Awards	Producer of the Year	Andy Shauf	Won	
2016	SOCAN Songwriting Prize	English Songwriting Prize	"Wendell Walker"	Nominated	
2016	Polaris Music Prize	Best Full-length Canadian Album	The Party	Nominated	
2017	Juno Awards	Breakthrough Artist of the Year	Andy Shauf	Nominated	
2017	Juno Awards	Adult Alternative Album of the Year	The Party	Nominated	
2017	Juno Awards	Recording Engineer of the Year	"The Magician"	Nominated	
2017	Juno Awards	Recording Engineer of the Year	"To You"	Nominated	
2017	Canadian Independent Music Awards	Album of the Year	The Party	Nominated	
2017	Canadian Independent Music Awards	Songwriter of the Year	"The Magician" & "Quite Like You"	Nominated	
2017	Western Canadian Music Awards	BreakOut Artist of the Year	Andy Shauf	Nominated	
2017	Western Canadian Music Awards	Pop Artist of the Year	Andy Shauf	Won	
2017	Western Canadian Music Awards	Producer of the Year	The Party	Nominated	
2017	Western Canadian Music Awards	Recording of the Year	The Party	Nominated	
2017	Western Canadian Music Awards	Songwriter of the Year	"The Magician"	Nominated	
2020	Juno Awards	Alternative Album of the Year	Foxwarren	Nominated	
2022	Juno Awards	Adult Alternative Album of the Year	Wilds	Nominated	
