= Mariel Buckley =

Canadian singer-songwriter

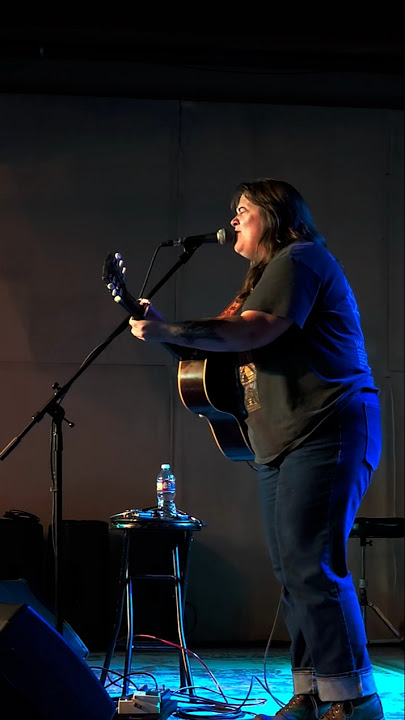
- Buckley in 2025
- Occupations: Singer, songwriter
- Musical career
- Genres: Roots, Americana, Folk
- Instruments: Vocals, guitar
- Website: marielbuckley.com

Mariel Buckley is a Canadian country music singer-songwriter based in Edmonton, Alberta. She is the younger sister of singer T. Buckley.

== Biography ==
Buckley was born in Calgary, Alberta and primarily lived there until moving to Edmonton around 2020.

Buckley recorded an EP in 2012, and her first album, Motorhome, in 2014. The album was produced by Derek Pulliam, and featured mainly acoustic music. Buckley was accompanied by a string trio with Charlie Hase on pedal steel, Scott Duncan on fiddle, and Pulliam on bass. Buckley was a finalist in the 2014 All-Alberta Songwriting Contest.

In 2018, she recorded a second album, the alt-country Driving in the Dark. The album was produced by Leeroy Stagger. In August that year the album rose to #2 on the !earshot National Folk/Roots/Blues Chart. Also in 2018 Buckley performed at the Vancouver Folk Music Festival.

Her sophomore commercial release, Everywhere I Used to Be, was released in August 2022 on Winnipeg-based label Birthday Cake Records. It was longlisted for the 2023 Polaris Music Prize.

In December 2022, Buckley and her brother released a cover The Tragically Hip's "Bobcaygeon" as a single. The two have also continued to perform together as a duo at other times, performing a set that includes duet versions of their own songs as well as covers of material by other artists.

Her second release on Birthday Cake Records and most recent full-length album, Strange Trip Ahead, was released in October 2025. It was recorded in Nashville, TN, with her Edmonton-based band members and produced by Jarrad K (Ruston Kelly, Weezer) at Chateau Noir Studios.

In 2026, she won the Juno Award for Contemporary Roots Album of the Year at the Juno Awards of 2026, for Strange Trip Ahead. The album was also longlisted for the 2026 Polaris Music Prize, and the song "Vending Machines" was longlisted for the SOCAN Polaris Song Prize.
