= No Joy =

Canadian music band

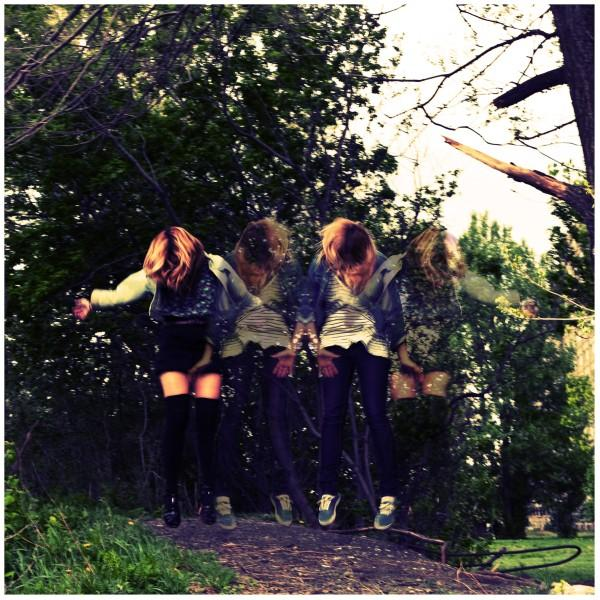

Background information
- Origin: Montreal, Canada
- Genres: Shoegaze; indie rock; dream pop; noise pop
- Years active: 2009–present
- Labels: Joyful Noise; Mexican Summer; Hand Drawn Dracula; Topshelf; Sonic Cathedral
- Members: Jasamine White-Gluz
- Past members: Laura Lloyd, Garland Hastings
- Website: http://nojoymusic.com/

No Joy are a Canadian shoegaze band from Montreal formed in late 2009 by Jasamine White-Gluz.

== Biography ==
No Joy's first show was with Grant Hart of Hüsker Dü on December 15, 2009. The band continued to play locally, including a show with then-up-and-coming indie band Best Coast. The latter's lead singer, Bethany Cosentino, took a liking to the band and tweeted, "Dude, No Joy is the best band ever. Two hot blonde girls just shredding away. Sooooo amazing".

The band soon signed to Mexican Summer and released their first 7-inch single, "No Summer" b/w "No Joy". Its release enabled No Joy to book their own national U.S. tour, bringing along La Sera (a Vivian Girls side project) for a three-week stint of mostly West Coast shows. Around this time, London-based label Sexbeat reissued the debut 7-inch for a UK/European release. No Joy toured later that fall with Mexican Summer labelmates Dungen.

The 7-inch sold out quickly; six months later, on November 16, 2010, No Joy released their debut LP, Ghost Blonde, to wide critical acclaim. Pitchfork reviewed the album, saying that "The guitars, loud enough to obliterate everything within 50 yards, create a balmy atmosphere where lacerating riffs and blurry strumming shares face time with ear-piercing feedback".

The band's strong DIY mentality in terms of producing and recording their music was highlighted in an interview with The Stool Pigeon: "You can record anything for free now. If you've got a laptop or a friend's laptop, do it yourself,". However they left the mixing side of the project up to the Raveonettes' Sune Rose Wagner. On working with Wagner, White-Gluz said, "We were recording in our space and it was sounding like shit, so we had the idea of someone helping to clean it up a little bit, but everybody in Montreal was asking for way too much money. And we've both always liked the way Raveonettes' records sound. We exchanged emails a few times and we had exactly the same music tastes, so it just went from there". The final package "convincingly captures the gloriously fuzzy, effects-covered sound of the shoegaze era, but escapes being mere copycats by adding a wonderfully spooky atmosphere and by writing hooky, easy to swallow melodies", said a 4.5 star review from AllMusic.

The praise for Ghost Blonde, and No Joy's notoriously loud and hypnotizing live act, garnered attention from notable publications such as The New York Times, BrooklynVegan, and The Guardian, amongst others.

In early 2011, No Joy released 7-inch single "Hawaii" in the UK; the B-side was a remix of the song "Indigo Child" done by Stereolab's Tim Gane.

No Joy toured the United Kingdom in early 2011, their first stint overseas, with Florida band Surfer Blood, and returned a month later for a European tour including a show in London with Wire and an appearance at Barcelona's Primavera Sound festival. Immediately upon returning, the band flew to SXSW where they played nine shows showcasing for media including Pitchfork, The A.V. Club and Gorilla vs. Bear.

The band toured North America during the remainder of 2011, supporting Vivian Girls and then co-headlining with Marnie Stern, with whom they released a split single (No Joy contributed Shangri-Las cover "He Cried").

In June 2012, with No Joy's second album they began working with producer Jorge Elbrecht (Sky Ferreira, Ariel Pink, Japanese Breakfast) who would go on to become an integral part of the band's sound. Wait to Pleasure was critically acclaimed, receiving an 8.0 from Pitchfork.

In March 2015, No Joy announced the June 9 release of their third album, More Faithful.

On June 15, 2016, No Joy released Drool Sucker on Topshelf Records, the first in a planned series of EPs. It was followed by Creep, released on February 24, 2017, on new label Grey Market.

Exploring an interest in electronic music, No Joy collaborated with former Spacemen 3 member Peter Kember (aka Sonic Boom); the resulting EP, titled No Joy/Sonic Boom, was released March 30, 2018, by Joyful Noise Recordings.

No Joy's fourth album, Motherhood, was released on August 21, 2020, via Joyful Noise Recordings. According to the press release, No Joy is now presented as a solo project of White-Gluz.

On August 11, 2025, critic Sadie Sartini Garner gave Bugland a Best New Music review on Pitchfork, awarding the record an 8.3 score. The album was longlisted for the 2026 Polaris Music Prize, and the song "Jelly Meadow Bright" was longlisted for the SOCAN Polaris Song Prize.

== Discography ==
=== Studio albums ===
- Ghost Blonde (2010, Mexican Summer)
- Wait to Pleasure (2013, Mexican Summer)
- More Faithful (2015, Mexican Summer)
- Motherhood (2020, Joyful Noise Recordings)
- Bugland (2025, Hand Drawn Dracula, Sonic Cathedral)
- Big Life, Big Leaf (2026)

=== EPs ===
- Negaverse (2012, Mexican Summer)
- Pastel and Pass Out (2013, Mexican Summer)
- Drool Sucker (2016, Topshelf Records)
- Creep (2017, Grey Market)
- No Joy/Sonic Boom with Peter Kember (2018, Joyful Noise Recordings)
- Can My Daughter See Me from Heaven (2021, Joyful Noise Recordings)

=== Singles ===
- "No Summer" 7 (2010, Mexican Summer/Sexbeat)
- "Hawaii"" 7 (2010, Mexican Summer)
- "He Cried" split 7-inch with Marnie Stern (2011, Associated Electronic Recordings)
- "Hare Tarot Lies" digital single (2013, Mexican Summer)
- "Hollywood Teeth" digital single (2015, Mexican Summer)
- "Everything New" digital single (2015, Mexican Summer)
- "Califone" digital single (2017, Grey Market)
- "Birthmark" digital single (2020, Joyful Noise)
- "Bugland" digital single (2025, Hand Drawn Dracula)
- "Bits" digital single (2025, Hand Drawn Dracula)
- "My Crud Princess" digital single, (2025, Hand Drawn Dracula)
