= Wait to Pleasure =

Studio album by No Joy
- Released: April 23, 2013
- Genres: Indie rock, shoegaze, noise pop
- Length: 36:02
- Label: Mexican Summer
- Producers: No Joy; Jorge Elbrecht

No Joy chronology
Ghost Blonde (2010)	Wait to Pleasure (2013)	More Faithful (2015)

Singles from Wait to Pleasure
- 1. "Lunar Phobia" Released: February 19, 2013; 2. "Hare Tarot Lies" Released: April 2, 2013

Wait to Pleasure is the second studio album by Canadian shoegaze band No Joy. The album was released in April 2013 on Mexican Summer.

Two singles were released from the album, "Lunar Phobia" on February 19, 2013, and "Hare Tarot Lies" on April 2, 2013.

== Critical reception ==
Professional ratings
Aggregate scores
Source	Rating
Metacritic	76/100
Review scores
Source	Rating
AllMusic	4.0/5 stars
Consequence of Sound	3/5 stars
Drowned In Sound	7/10
Exclaim!	8/10
Filter	84%
NME	6/10
NOW Magazine	4/5 stars
Pitchfork	8/10
PopMatters	8/10
This Is Fake DIY	7/10

According to the review aggregator Metacritic, Wait to Pleasure received "generally favorable reviews" based on a weighted average score of 76 out of 100 from 15 critic scores.

== Track listing ==
No.	Title	Length
1.	"E"	5:19
2.	"Hare Tarot Lies"	3:26
3.	"Prodigy"	2:36
4.	"Slug Night"	3:39
5.	"Blue Neck Riviera"	4:22
6.	"Lizard Kids"	2:21
7.	"Lunar Phobia"	3:51
8.	"Wrack Attack"	2:56
9.	"Ignored Pets"	2:43
10.	"Pleasure"	2:05
11.	"Uhy Yuoi Yoi"	2:44
Total length:		36:02

== Personnel ==
Credits adapted from liner notes.

- No Joy – production
- Jorge Elbrecht – production, mixing
- Joe Lambert – mastering
- Shaun Durkan – artwork
