= Arielle Soucy =

Canadian folk singer

Arielle Soucy is a Canadian folk singer-songwriter from Quebec, whose debut full-length album Il n'y a rien que je ne suis pas was released in 2023.

Originally from Brébeuf, Quebec, she released two independent EPs, Shame and Waterway (2020) and Unresolved Collection (2021), before signing to the Bonbonbon record label in 2022.

Il n'y a rien que je ne suis pas was a longlisted nominee for the 2024 Polaris Music Prize.

Passages was longlisted for the 2026 Polaris Music Prize, and the song "Varieties of Quiet" was longlisted for the 2026 SOCAN Polaris Song Prize.

== Discography ==
- Shame and Waterway - 2020
- Unresolved Collection - 2021
- Il n'y a rien que je ne suis pas - 2023
- Passages - 2026
