= Saguenay flood =

1996 flash flood that hit Saguenay-Lac-Saint-Jean region of Quebec, Canada

Coordinates: 48°25′30″N 71°04′34″W

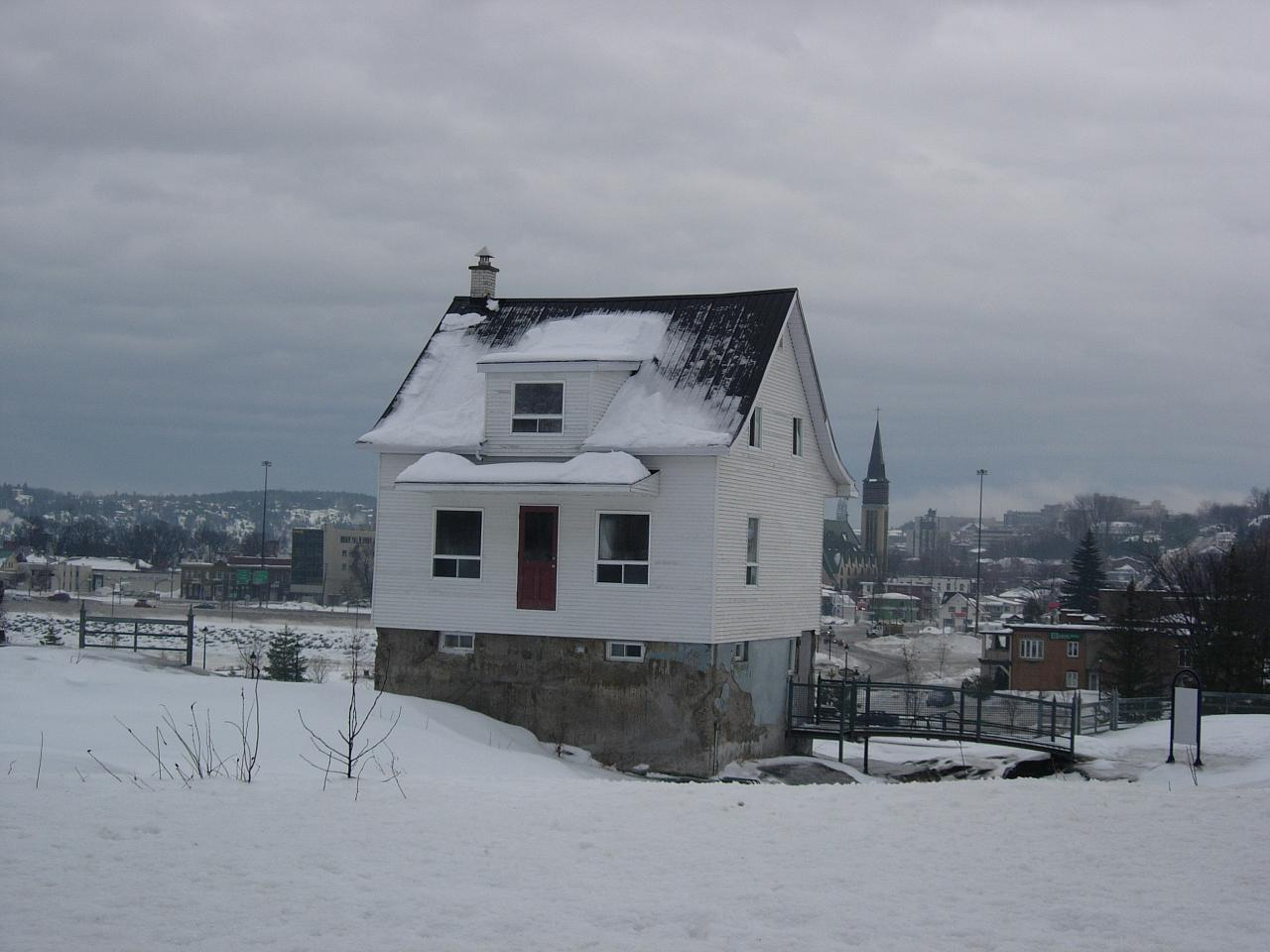
- The "little white house" at Saguenay, in 2008.

Meteorological history
- Duration: July 19–20, 1996

Overall effects
- Fatalities: 10
- Damage: CA$1.5 billion
- Areas affected: Saguenay–Lac-Saint-Jean region of Quebec

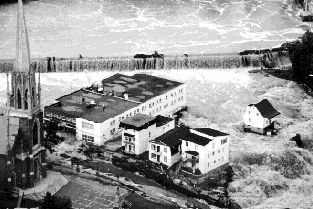
Flooding in Chicoutimi during the Saguenay Flood.

The Saguenay flood (French: Déluge du Saguenay) was a series of flash floods on July 19 and 20, 1996 that hit the Saguenay–Lac-Saint-Jean region of Quebec, Canada. It was the biggest overland flood in 20th-century Canadian history.

== History ==
Problems started after two weeks of constant rain, which severely engorged soils, rivers and reservoirs. The Saguenay region is a geological graben, which increased the effect of the sudden massive rains of July 19, 1996. In two days, rainfall accumulated that was "equivalent to the volume of water that tumbles over Niagara Falls in four weeks."

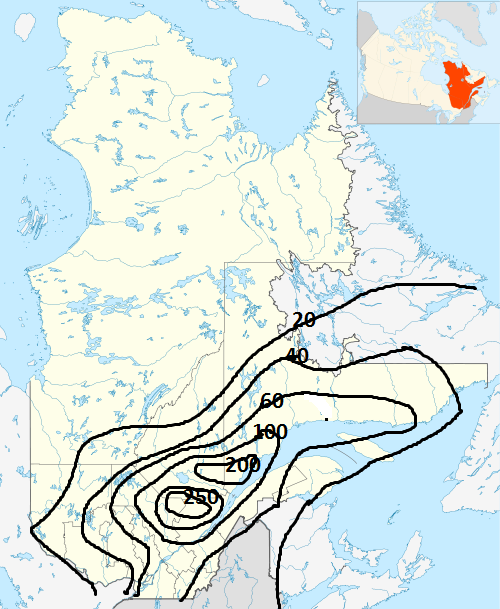
Map of rain accumulations from July 18 to 21, 1996, over Quebec province (Canada) during the Saguenay Flood.

Over 8 feet (2.4 m) of water flooded parts of Chicoutimi and La Baie, completely levelling an entire neighbourhood. Estimates reach CA$1.5 billion in damages, a cost made greater by the disaster's occurrence at the height of the tourist season. Post-flood enquiries discovered that the network of dikes and dams protecting the city of Chicoutimi was poorly maintained. In the end, 488 homes were destroyed, 1,230 damaged, 16,000 people evacuated, and 10 people died. An additional 2 people died in the mudslides produced by the incredible rain.

== Legacy ==
A small white house (referred to in French as La petite maison blanche, "The little white house") stood nearly unharmed in Chicoutimi while torrents of water rushed in on every side, and it became the symbol of surviving the flood. It was owned by Jeanne d'Arc Lavoie-Genest. With its foundation still highly exposed after the flooding, it has been preserved in Saguenay (the city name has changed) as a historical park and museum commemorating the flood.

An unexpected effect of the flood was to cover the heavily contaminated sediments at the bottom of the Saguenay and Ha! Ha! Rivers with 10 to 50 centimetres (3.9 to 19.7 in) of new, relatively clean sediments. Because of this, research has shown that the old sediments are no longer a threat to ecosystems and the river will not have to be dredged and treated to control contamination.

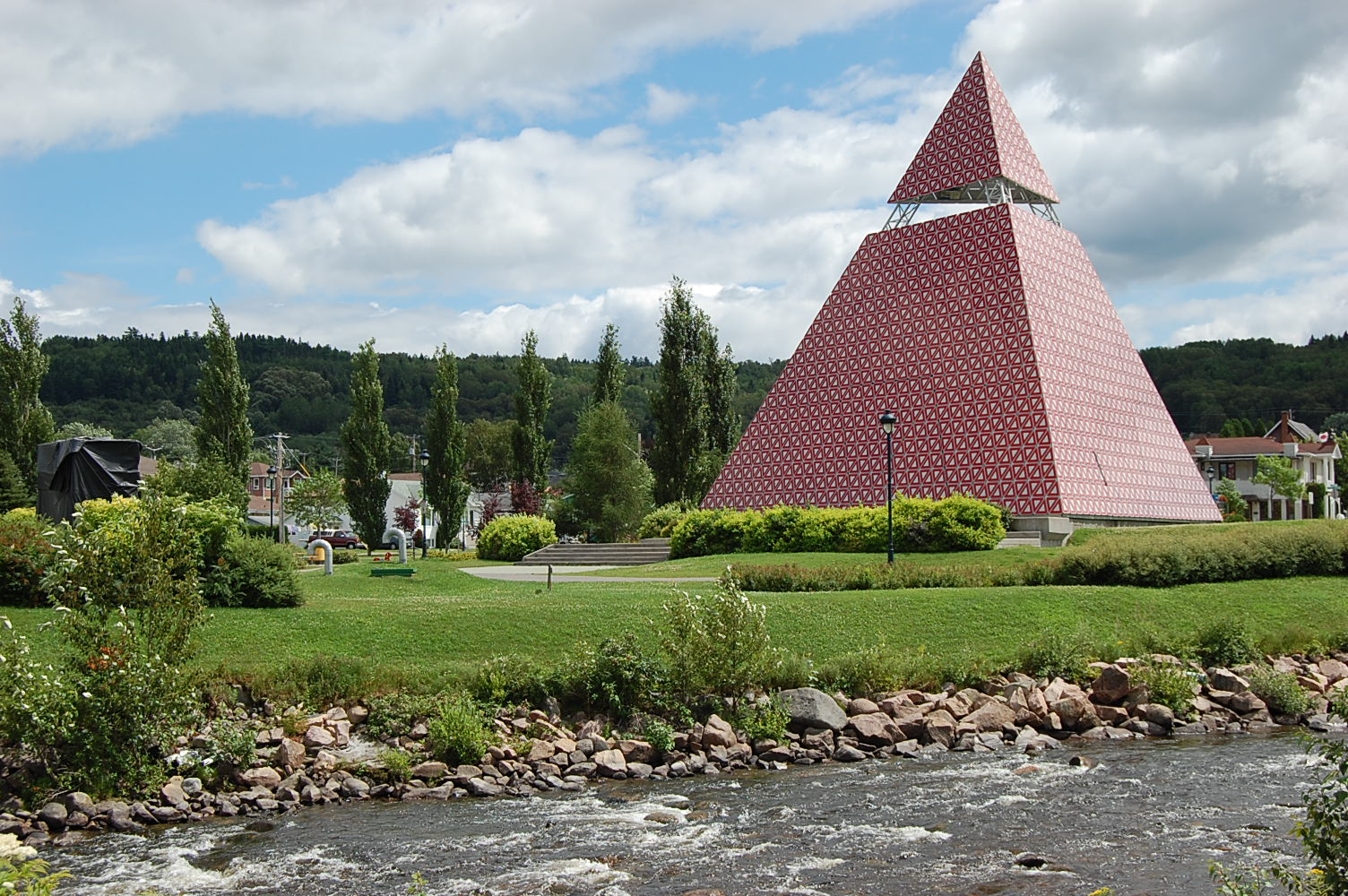
Pyramide des Ha! Ha! at the river

The Ha! Ha! Pyramid made of 3,000 yield signs was created in 1997 to memorialise the flood.
