= Ghost Blonde =

Studio album by No Joy
- Released: November 16, 2010
- Genre: Shoegaze; noise pop
- Length: 36:51
- Label: Mexican Summer
- Producer: No Joy

No Joy chronology
Ghost Blonde (2010)	Wait to Pleasure (2013)

Singles from Ghost Blonde
- 1. "Hawaii" Released: April 25, 2011

Ghost Blonde is the debut studio album by Canadian band No Joy. It was released on November 16, 2010, through Mexican Summer. It received generally favorable reviews from critics.

== Background ==
Jasamine White-Gluz and Laura Lloyd formed No Joy in 2009. The band later expanded to a four-piece. Ghost Blonde is the band's debut studio album. The album is mixed by Sune Rose Wagner of the Raveonettes.

Ghost Blonde was originally released on November 16, 2010, through Mexican Summer. In the United Kingdom, the album was released on May 2, 2011.

"Hawaii" was released as a single from the album, on April 25, 2011. The single includes Stereolab's remix of "Indigo Child" on the B-side.

== Critical reception ==
Professional ratings
Aggregate scores
Source	Rating
Metacritic	77/100
Review scores
Source	Rating
AllMusic	3.5/5 stars
DIY	3/5 stars
Filter	83%
NME	6/10
Now	4/5
Pitchfork	7.7/10

According to the review aggregator Metacritic, Ghost Blonde received "generally favorable reviews" based on a weighted average score of 77 out of 100 from 9 critic scores.

Richard Trapunski of Now commented that "The shoegaze genre usually plays better in a live context, yet Ghost Blonde is a relatively immersive record." He added, "You need to crank the volume to hear the vocals, but it's the guitars that provide the hooks anyway." Lauren Barbato of Filter stated, "Despite the angst and contemplation, Ghost Blonde brings a bit of elation to a new, directionless generation of shoegazers." Tim Sendra of AllMusic called the album "an exhilarating listen no matter if you're a longtime lover of the sound or if it's your first time hearing guitars pedaled to death." Martin Douglas of Pitchfork stated, "while Ghost Blonde can feel like it's keeping the listener at arm's length, further listens reveal a record full of vibrancy, the kind in which you soon find yourself fully immersed."

== Track listing ==
Ghost Blonde track listing
No.	Title	Length
1.	"Mediumship"	3:18
2.	"Heedless"	3:21
3.	"Maggie Says I Love You"	3:35
4.	"You Girls Smoke Cigarettes?"	2:19
5.	"Pacific Pride"	3:39
6.	"Hawaii"	4:05
7.	"Indigo Child"	5:10
8.	"Still"	3:42
9.	"Untitled"	1:13
10.	"Ghost Blonde"	6:29
Total length:		36:51

== Personnel ==
Credits adapted from liner notes.

- No Joy – production, recording
- Sune Rose Wagner – mixing
- Paul Gold – mastering
- Shawn Kuruneru – artwork
- Gordon Ball – photography
