= 2026 Polaris Music Prize =

Canadian music award

- Date: September 22, 2026
- Location: Massey Hall; Toronto, Ontario
- Country: Canada
- Hosted by: Odario Williams
- Winner(s): Angine de Poitrine, Vol. II
- Website: polarismusicprize.ca

The 2026 edition of the Canadian Polaris Music Prize was presented on September 22, 2026 at Massey Hall in Toronto, Ontario.

The 2026 edition saw changes to the prize's voting process. Instead of the longtime 11-member "grand jury" deliberating and voting on the final winner, the process will now be opened to the full 205-member voting panel who were involved in the nomination process.

== Albums ==
=== Shortlist ===
The shortlist for albums was announced on July 9.

- Angine de Poitrine, Vol. II
- Aquakultre, 1783
- Begonia, Fantasy Life
- Bibi Club, Amaro
- Charlotte Cornfield, Hurts Like Hell
- Beverly Glenn-Copeland, Laughter in Summer
- Rochelle Jordan, Through the Wall
- Les Louanges, Alouette!
- Peaches, No Lube So Rude
- Tanya Tagaq, Saputjiji

=== Longlist ===
The longlist for albums was announced on June 11.

- Angine de Poitrine, Vol. II
- Aquakultre, 1783
- Baby Nova, Shhugar
- The Beaches, No Hard Feelings
- Begonia, Fantasy Life
- Bibi Club, Amaro
- Boy Golden, Best of Our Possible Lives
- Mariel Buckley, Strange Trip Ahead
- Lou-Adriane Cassidy, Triste Animal
- Ora Cogan, Hard Hearted Woman
- Cootie Catcher, Something We All Got
- Charlotte Cornfield, Hurts Like Hell
- Daphni, Butterfly
- Nadah El Shazly, Laini Tani
- Dominique Fils-Aimé, My World Is the Sun
- Foxwarren, 2
- Beverly Glenn-Copeland, Laughter in Summer
- Holy Fuck, Event Beat
- Home Front, Watch It Die
- JayWood, Leo Negro
- Rochelle Jordan, Through the Wall
- Kaytranada, Ain't No Damn Way!
- Catherine Leduc, Les jours où il neige à tous les postes
- Les Louanges, Alouette!
- Men I Trust, Equus Caballus
- Tami Neilson, Neon Cowgirl
- No Joy, Bugland
- Ouri, Daisy Cutter
- Peaches, No Lube So Rude
- Pony, Clearly Cursed
- Propagandhi, At Peace
- PUP, Who Will Look After the Dogs?
- Julianna Riolino, Echo in the Dust
- Shad, Start Anew
- Slash Need, Sit & Grin
- Arielle Soucy, Passages
- Tanya Tagaq, Saputjiji
- Tobi, For Good Measure (at Dreamhouse Studios)
- Katie Tupper, Greyhound
- Charlotte Day Wilson, Patchwork

== Songs ==
=== Shortlist ===
The shortlist for songs was announced on July 29.

- Angine de Poitrine, "Fabienk"
- Charlotte Cornfield, "Hurts Like Hell"
- PUP, "Hunger for Death"
- Patrick Watson and Martha Wainwright, "House on Fire"
- Charlotte Day Wilson feat. Saya Gray, "Lean"

=== Longlist ===
The longlist for songs was announced on June 24.

- Angine de Poitrine, "Fabienk"
- Angine de Poitrine, "Yor Zarad"
- Aquakultre, "Gallows"
- Aquakultre, "Holy"
- Begonia, "My Fantasy Life"
- Blue Moon Marquee with Northern Cree, "Put Your Feathers On"
- Mariel Buckley, "Vending Machines"
- Cadence Weapon feat. Junia-T and DijahSB, "Step Out"
- Charlotte Cornfield, "Hurts Like Hell"
- Rochelle Jordan, "The Boy"
- Les Louanges, "Correct"
- Les Louanges, "La journée va être chaude"
- No Joy feat. Fire-Toolz, "Jelly Meadow Bright"
- Ouri feat. Oli XL, "Paris"
- PUP, "Hunger for Death"
- Julianna Riolino, "Seed"
- Sloan, "No Damn Fears"
- Arielle Soucy, "Varieties of Quiet"
- Patrick Watson and Martha Wainwright, "House on Fire"
- Charlotte Day Wilson feat. Saya Gray, "Lean"

== Polaris Heritage Prize ==
Nominees for the Polaris Heritage Prize were announced on August 5, with voting open until August 21.

- Public Prize: The Watchmen, McLaren Furnace Room
- Jury Prize: Willie Dunn, Willie Dunn
- Annihilator, Alice in Hell
- Les Colocs, Les Colocs
- Richard Desjardins, Tu m'aimes-tu
- Mort Garson, Mother Earth's Plantasia
- Sarah Harmer, You Were Here
- k.d. lang, Absolute Torch and Twang
- Joni Mitchell, Court and Spark
- Muzion, Mentalité Moune Morne... (Ils n'ont pas compris)
- Rough Trade, Avoid Freud
- Various Artists, Kwakiutl: Indian Music of the Pacific Northwest
