= Julianna Riolino =

Canadian singer

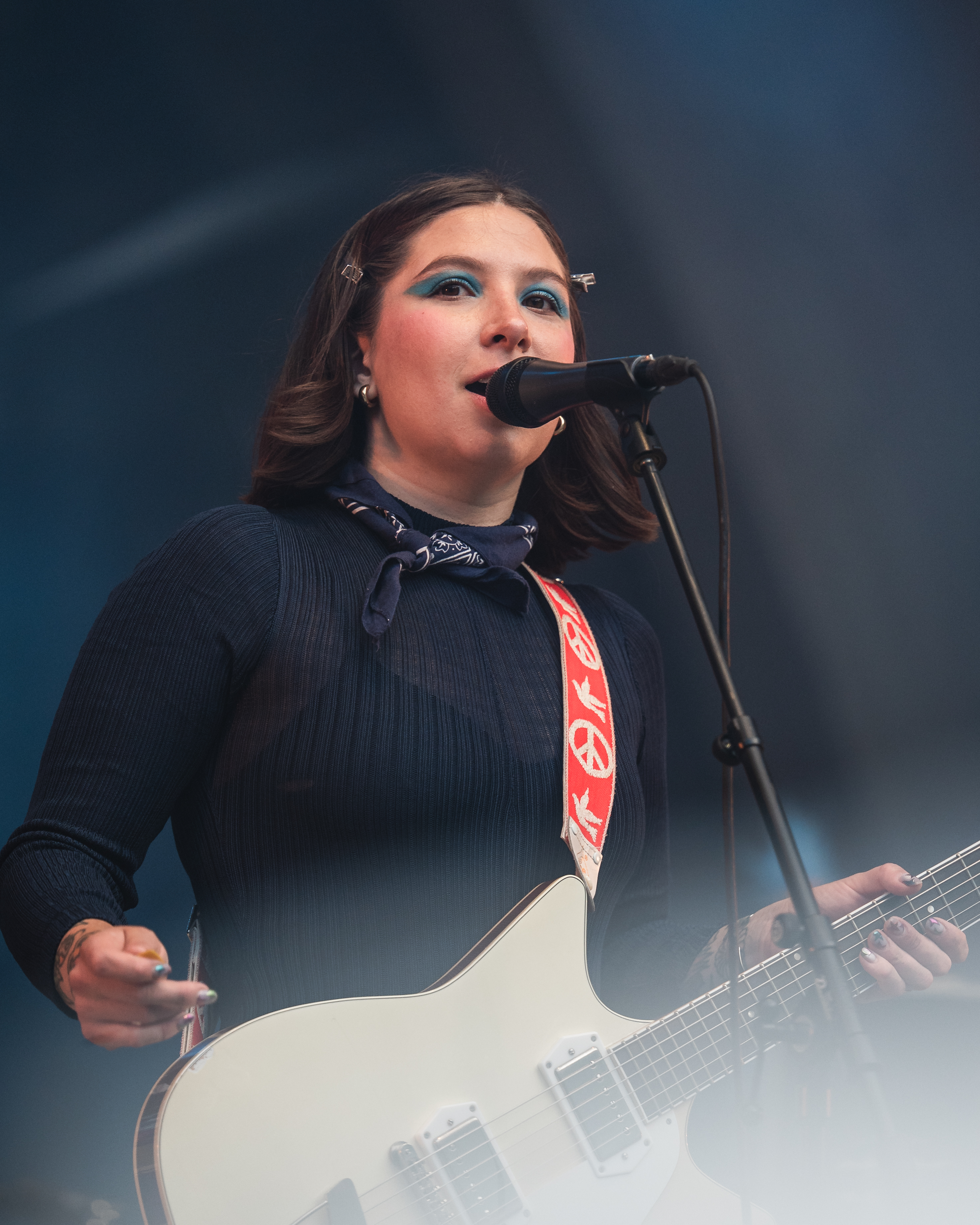
Julianna Riolino at the Ravnedalen Live open air festival in Kristiansand, Norway, 2026

Julianna Riolino is a Canadian alternative country singer-songwriter based in Welland, Ontario, who has recorded and performed both as a solo artist and as a backing vocalist for Daniel Romano's Outfit.

After a number of years performing with Romano, she released the solo EP J.R. in 2019, before following up with the full-length album All Blue in 2022.

She released her second solo album, Echo in the Dust, in 2025. In 2026 she released a deluxe version of the album, with three additional songs recorded during the same sessions but not included in the original 2025 release.

The album was longlisted for the 2026 Polaris Music Prize, and the song "Seed" was longlisted for the SOCAN Polaris Song Prize.

== Discography ==
- J.R. - 2019
- All Blue - 2022
- Echo in the Dust - 2025
