= Foxwarren (band) =

Canadian indie rock band

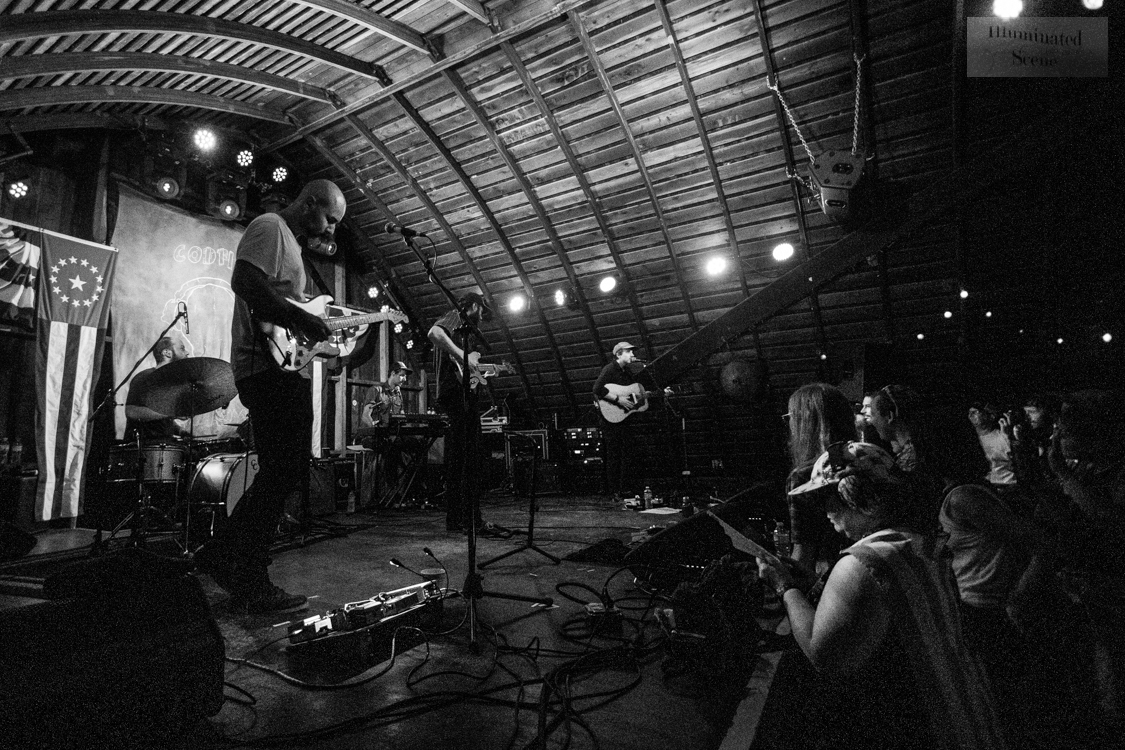
- Foxwarren performing at Codfish Hollow in Maquoketa, Iowa, July 2019

Background information
- Origin: Regina, Saskatchewan
- Genres: Indie rock; Indie pop; Indie folk
- Years active: 2009–present
- Labels: Anti-, Arts & Crafts
- Members: Andy Shauf; Avery Kissick; Darryl Kissick; Dallas Bryson; Colin Nealis
- Website: foxwarrenhq.com

Foxwarren is a Canadian indie rock band from Regina, Saskatchewan. Formed in 2009, Foxwarren has released three full-length albums. (Note: Technically their debut album was Has Been Defeated (2011) but it is "isn't widely known or recognized by the band".) Foxwarren was nominated for the Alternative Album of the Year at the 2020 Juno Awards for their album Foxwarren. Their latest album, 2, was released on 30 May 2025 by Anti-.

The current members of Foxwarren are Andy Shauf, brothers Avery and Darryl Kissick, Dallas Bryson, and Colin Nealis.

== History ==
Foxwarren was founded in 2009 by Andy Shauf, brothers Avery and Darryl Kissick, and Dallas Bryson. The band is named after the Kissicks’ hometown, Foxwarren, Manitoba. Shauf and Bryson, who were high school friends in Caronport, first met the Kissicks through Regina's music scene and through the Sears call centre, where Shauf and Avery Kissick worked.

The band’s first album, Has Been Defeated, was released in 2011. It would later be dismissed as having been the band’s first album, with the 2018 Foxwarren instead being widely billed as being Foxwarren's "self-titled debut". Has Been Defeated, however, is stylistically different from the self-titled record, was never pressed on vinyl, and has been described as not being "widely known or recognized by the band".

Foxwarren began working on its next project, the self-titled Foxwarren, around 2014. It would be released on 30 November 2018. With the exception of one song recorded in 2017, all of the tracks on the album were recorded four years earlier in Regina and Manitoba. Shauf had presented the album to his record labels and they were receptive to it, but the album remained unreleased as Shauf was busy with his solo touring and recording schedule.

Their latest album, 2, was released on 30 May 2025 by Anti-. It was recorded with the band members separate from each other, each in their own respective provinces where they now live. To promote the album, Foxwarren announced a tour of Europe and North America titled The 2er, supported in Europe by Elanor Moss and in North America by Folk Bitch Trio and Hannah Frances. The album was longlisted for the 2026 Polaris Music Prize.

== Band members ==
- Andy Shauf – lead vocals, guitar, keyboard
- Avery Kissick – drums, percussion
- Darryl Kissick – bass
- Dallas Bryson – guitar, backing vocals
- Colin Nealis (2019–present)

== Discography ==
- Has Been Defeated (2011)
- Foxwarren (2018)
- 2 (2025)
