= The Neon Skyline =

Studio album by Andy Shauf
- Released: January 24, 2020
- Length: 34:51
- Label: Anti-
- Producer: Andy Shauf

Andy Shauf chronology
The Party (2016)	The Neon Skyline (2020)	Wilds (2021)

Professional ratings
Aggregate scores
Source	Rating
Metacritic	81/100
Review scores
Source	Rating
AllMusic	4/5 stars
Clash	8/10
Exclaim!	9/10
Loud and Quiet	8/10
Now	5/5 Ns
Paste	8.1/10
Pitchfork	7.9/10

The Neon Skyline is the sixth studio album by Canadian musician Andy Shauf. It was released on January 24, 2020, under Anti-.

A tour in support of the album was scheduled for February 2020, but was postponed to August 2020 due to the COVID-19 pandemic.

President Barack Obama featured the title track, "Neon Skyline", on his 2020 summer playlist. Commenting on this honor, Shauf stated, "It’s cool to think that Obama, or the Obamas together, have listened to my music. It’s a really nice feeling to think my music has gone that far."

== Critical reception ==
The Neon Skyline was met with universal acclaim reviews from critics. At Metacritic, which assigns a weighted average rating out of 100 to reviews from mainstream publications, this release received an average score of 81, based on 12 reviews.

=== Accolades ===
Accolades for The Neon Skyline
Publication	Accolade	Rank	Ref.
Billboard	Billboard's 50 Best Albums of 2020 – Mid-Year	—N/a	
Consequence of Sound	Top 50 Albums of 2020	48	
Exclaim!	Exclaim!'s 50 Best Albums of 2020	13	
Louder than War	Top 50 Albums of 2020	29	
Stereogum	Stereogum's 50 Best Albums of 2020 – Mid-Year	27	
Stereogum	The 50 Best Albums of 2020	34	
Under the Radar	Top 100 Albums of 2020	27	

== Track listing ==
All tracks are written and arranged by Andy Shauf.

The Neon Skyline track listing
No.	Title	Length
1.	"Neon Skyline"	3:38
2.	"Where Are You Judy"	3:21
3.	"Clove Cigarette"	2:55
4.	"Thirteen Hours"	2:58
5.	"Things I Do"	2:27
6.	"Living Room"	3:05
7.	"Dust Kids"	2:40
8.	"The Moon"	3:36
9.	"Try Again"	3:48
10.	"Fire Truck"	3:21
11.	"Changer"	3:02
Total length:		34:51

== Personnel ==
- Andy Shauf – production
- Philip Shaw Bova – mastering
- Rob Schnapf – mixing
- Matt Schuessler – mixing assistance
- Meghan Fenske – artwork
- Colin Medley – photography

== Charts ==
Chart performance for The Neon Skyline
Chart (2020)	Peak position
Canadian Albums (Billboard)	91
UK Americana Albums (Official Charts)	3
US Heatseekers Albums (Billboard)	23
