= GAMIQ =

Quebecois music festival

The Alternative Independent Music Gala of Quebec (French: Gala alternatif de la musique indépendante du Québec; GAMIQ) is an award-giving event created in 2006. It rewards emerging artists from the Quebec music scene. The awards are granted after the ADISQ awards, and ADISQ award winners are ineligible for GAMIQ awards.
