= The Party (Andy Shauf album) =

Studio album by Andy Shauf
- Released: May 20, 2016
- Length: 37:25
- Label: Anti-
- Producer: Andy Shauf

Andy Shauf chronology
| The Bearer of Bad News (2012) | The Party (2016) | The Neon Skyline (2020) |

The Party is the fifth studio album by Canadian musician Andy Shauf. It was released on May 20, 2016 under Anti-.

== Background ==
As its title suggests, The Party is a concept album set at a house party, consisting of a series of vignettes taking place over the course of a single night. Shauf has stated that he began the album by working on unrelated songs, but that about halfway through the process, he decided on the theme of a party. Although each song presents a different character, many of them have personal or autobiographical elements.

The album was originally recorded and produced independently, with Shauf completing the album before meeting with any record labels. After presenting it to Anti-, however, he re-recorded and edited much of the music before releasing it. Shauf wrote, performed, engineered, and produced the entire album himself, with the exception of the string arrangements, which were written and performed by Colin Nealis.

Shauf performed two songs from the album in a Tiny Desk Concert released the same day as the album.

== Reception ==
Professional ratings
Aggregate scores
| Source | Rating |
|---|---|
| Metacritic | 83/100 |
Review scores
| Source | Rating |
| AllMusic | 4/5 stars |
| The Guardian | 4/5 stars |

The Party was met with positive reviews, with particular praise for Shauf's storytelling and character studies. On Metacritic, which assigns a normalized score out of 100 to reviews from mainstream publications, the album received an average score of 83 based on 9 reviews, indicating "universal acclaim".

The album was shortlisted for the 2016 Polaris Music Prize. In 2017, it was nominated for Adult Alternative Album of the Year at the Juno Awards. Shauf was also nominated for Recording Engineer of the Year for "The Magician" and "To You", and for Breakthrough Artist of the Year. The same year, Shauf and the album were nominated for multiple Canadian Independent Music Awards and Western Canadian Music Awards.

In discussing his more recent albums, some reviewers have noted The Party as the first album to win Shauf widespread recognition.

== Track listing ==
The Party track listing
| No. | Title | Length |
|---|---|---|
| 1. | "The Magician" | 3:52 |
| 2. | "Early to the Party" | 4:05 |
| 3. | "Twist Your Ankle" | 3:46 |
| 4. | "Quite Like You" | 3:25 |
| 5. | "Begin Again" | 3:17 |
| 6. | "The Worst in You" | 2:55 |
| 7. | "To You" | 3:54 |
| 8. | "Eyes of Them All" | 3:54 |
| 9. | "Alexander All Alone" | 3:58 |
| 10. | "Martha Sways" | 4:19 |
| Total length: | | 37:25 |
