= Cœur de pirate discography =

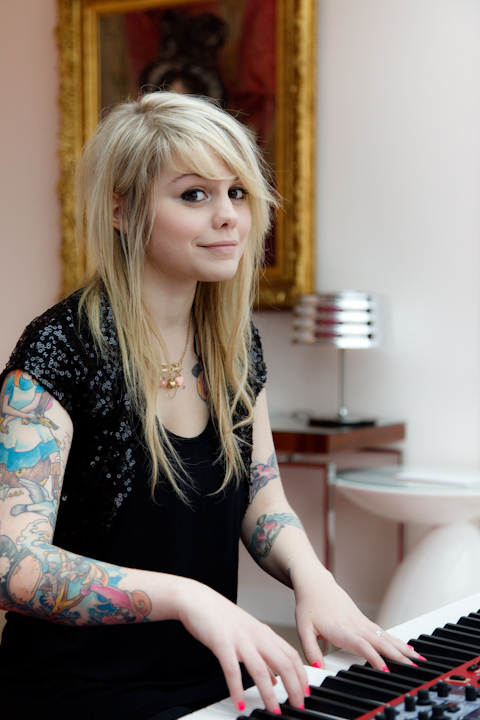
- Cœur de pirate in 2009
- Studio albums: 8
- Extended plays: 2
- Singles: 14
- Music videos: 10
- Guest appearances: 7

The discography of Cœur de pirate, a Canadian indie pop singer-songwriter, consists of eight studio albums, two extended plays, fourteen singles (including three as a featured performer and two promotional releases) and ten music videos. Cœur de pirate began her career in 2007 as the keyboardist for the band Bonjour Brumaire. That year she also began to record solo material and placed several demos on the social networking service Myspace.

Her self-titled solo debut studio album was released in September 2008. It reached number two on the French albums chart and was certified triple platinum by the Syndicat National de l'Édition Phonographique (SNEP). The following year, Cœur de pirate was nominated for "Francophone Album of the Year" at the Canadian Juno Awards. Four singles, "Comme des enfants", "Pour un infidèle", "Ensemble" and "Francis", were released from the album: "Pour un infidèle", a collaboration with Nouvelle Star winner Julien Doré, reached number one on the French singles chart. In late 2010, Cœur de pirate collaborated with alternative band Bedouin Soundclash on the song "Brutal Hearts" from their studio album Light the Horizon. The song marked her English language singing debut.

Cœur de pirate worked extensively with producer Howard Bilerman in recording her second studio album Blonde. Released in November 2011, the album is a hybrid of genres, combining pop, cabaret, tango and country music. It peaked at number two in the Wallonia region of Belgium and at number five in Canada and France. In 2012, it was nominated for the Canadian Polaris Music Prize. Two singles were released from the album: "Adieu" and "Golden Baby", both of which reached the top ten in Belgium.

== Studio albums ==
List of studio albums, with selected chart positions and certifications
Title	Album details	Peak chart positions							Certifications	Sales
Title	Album details	CAN	AUT	BEL (Fl)	BEL (WA)	FRA	GER	SWI	Certifications	Sales
Cœur de pirate	Released: September 16, 2008 (CAN); Label: Grosse Boîte (BOITE7); Formats: CD, DD, LP	—	—	—	4	2	—	35	MC: Platinum; BEA: Platinum; SNEP: Diamond	FRA : 500,000+
Blonde	Released: November 7, 2011 (CAN); Label: Grosse Boîte (BOITE22); Formats: CD, DD, LP	5	62	—	2	5	52	25	MC: Platinum; BEA: Gold; SNEP: Platinum	
Trauma	Released: January 14, 2014 (CAN); Label: Dare to Care; Formats: CD, DD, LP	2	—	39	3	12	—	73		
Child of Light	Released: April 29, 2014 (CAN); Label: Dare to Care; Formats: CD, DD; Soundtrack for video game Child of Light	—	—	—	—	—	—	—		
Roses	Released: August 28, 2015; Label: Dare to Care; Formats: CD, DD, LP	2	—	89	5	5	—	16	MC: Platinum; SNEP: Gold	CAN: 52,000
Les Souliers rouges	Released: September 9, 2016; Jointly with Arthur H & Marc Lavoine	—	—	—	7	6	—	40		
En cas de tempête, ce jardin sera fermé	Released: June 1, 2018; Label: Dare to Care; Formats: CD, DD, LP	4	—	88	2	6	—	14		
Perséides	Released: April 30, 2021; Label: Bravo musique; Formats: CD, DD, LP	38	—	—	—	—	—	—		
Impossible à aimer	Released: October 15, 2021; Label: Bravo musique; Formats: CD, DD	24	—	—	13	36	—	59		
Cavale	Released: September 26, 2025; Label: Bravo musique; Formats: CD, DD, LP	—	—	—	—	—	—	—		
"—" denotes items which were not released in that country or failed to chart.

== Extended plays ==
List of extended plays, with selected chart positions
Title	EP details	Peak chart positions
Title	EP details	BEL (WA)
NRJ Sessions: Cœur de pirate	Released: June 23, 2010 (FRA); Label: Dare to Care; Format: DD	51
iTunes Live from Montreal	Released: November 2, 2010 (CAN); Label: Grosse Boîte; Format: DD	—
"—" denotes items which were not released in that country or failed to chart.

== Singles ==
=== As a main artist ===
List of singles as a main artist, with selected chart positions and certifications, showing year released and album name
Title	Year	Peak chart positions					Certifications	Album
Title	Year	CAN	CAN AC	BEL (WA)	FRA	SWI	Certifications	Album
"Comme des enfants"	2009	—	—	2	4	62	BEA: Gold	Cœur de pirate
"Pour un infidèle" (with Julien Doré)	2010	—	—	8	1	43		Cœur de pirate
"Ensemble"	2010	—	—	40	—	—		Cœur de pirate
"Francis"	2010	—	—	—	—	—		Cœur de pirate
"Adieu"	2011	—	27	9	26	—		Blonde
"Golden Baby"	2012	—	—	— (Note: "Golden Baby" did not enter the Ultratop 50, but peaked at number 3 on the Wallonia Ultratip chart.)	94	—		Blonde
"Ain't No Sunshine"	2014	—	—	—	189	—		Trauma
"You Know I'm No Good"	2014	—	—	37	73	—		Trauma
"Mistral gagnant"	2014	—	—	17	13	—		La Bande à Renaud
"Oublie-moi" (Note: Also released in English as "Carry On")	2015	62	38	41	13	—		Roses
"Oceans Brawl"	2015	—	—	—	141	—		Roses
"Crier tout bas"	2015	—	49	—	66	—		Roses
"Prémonition"	2018	—	39	29	42	—		En cas de tempête, ce jardin sera fermé
"Somnambule"	2018	—	—	—	—	—		En cas de tempête, ce jardin sera fermé
"Dans la nuit" (featuring Loud)	2018	—	—	—	—	—		En cas de tempête, ce jardin sera fermé
"Ne m'appelle pas"	2019	—	—	17	—	—		Non-album singles
"T'es belle"	2020	—	—	—	—	—		Non-album singles
"Plan à trois"	2021	—	—	—	—	—		Non-album singles
"On s'aimera toujours"	2021	—	—	—	—	—		Impossible à aimer
"Dernière Danse" (with Kyo)	2023	—	—	—	32	—		
"—" denotes items which were not released in that country or failed to chart.

=== As a featured artist ===
List of singles as a featured artist, with selected chart positions, showing year released and album name
Title	Year	Peak chart positions		Album
Title	Year	BEL (WA)	FRA	Album
"Voilà les anges" (Nouvelle Vague featuring Cœur de pirate)	2010	— (Note: "Voilà les anges" did not enter the Ultratop 50, but peaked at number 12 on the Wallonia Ultratip chart.)	—	Couleurs sur Paris
"Brutal Hearts" (Bedouin Soundclash featuring Cœur de pirate)	2011	—	—	Light the Horizon
"Hélène" (duet with Roch Voisine)	2013	— (Note: "Hélène" did not enter the Ultratop 50, but peaked at number 16 on the Wallonia Ultratip chart.)	72	Duophonique
"—" denotes items which were not released in that country or failed to chart.

=== Promotional singles ===
List of promotional singles, showing year released and album name
Title	Year	Album
"Open Happiness" (with Kardinal Offishall and Jay Malinowski)	2009	Non-album releases
"Everyday"	2011	Non-album releases

== Guest appearances ==
List of non-single guest appearances, with other performing artists, showing year released and album name
Title	Year	Other artist(s)	Album
"Someone to Watch Over Me"	2009	Benoît Charest	Nos stars célèbrent le Jazz à Montréal
"Everyday Things" (Acoustic)	2010	David Usher	The Mile End Sessions
"La Reine"	2010	—N/a	Great Canadian Song Quest
"Voilà les anges"	2010	Nouvelle Vague	Couleurs sur Paris
"Tergiverse"	2011	Peter Peter	Peter Peter
"Noël blanc"	2011	Michel Legrand	Noël ! Noël !! Noël !!!
"Peace Sign"	2013	Lights	Siberia Acoustic

== Music videos ==
List of music videos, showing year released and director
Title	Year	Director(s)
"Comme des enfants"	2009	David Valiquette
"Pour un infidèle" (with Julien Doré)	2010	Martin Fournier
"Ensemble"	2010	Jeremie Saindon
"Francis"	2010	Unknown
"Adieu"	2011	Jeremie Saindon
"Brutal Hearts" (Version one) (Bedouin Soundclash featuring Cœur de pirate)	2011	Bruce McDonald
"Brutal Hearts" (Version two) (Bedouin Soundclash featuring Cœur de pirate)	2011	Bruce McDonald
"Golden Baby"	2012	Jeremie Saindon
"Place de la République"	2013	Béatrice Martin and Angus Borsos
"Hélène" (duet with Roch Voisine)	2013	Unknown
