= NRJ Sessions: Cœur de pirate =

EP by Cœur de pirate
- Released: June 23, 2010
- Genre: Indie pop
- Label: Dare to Care Records

Cœur de pirate chronology
Cœur de pirate (2008)	NRJ Sessions: Cœur de pirate (2010)	iTunes Live from Montreal (2010)

NRJ Sessions: Cœur de pirate is an extended play by Canadian singer Cœur de pirate. It was released as a digital download in France on June 23, 2010. The EP features songs from Cœur de pirate's self-titled debut studio album as well as a cover version of Air's song "Playground Love".

== Track listing ==
All tracks are written by Béatrice Martin, except where noted

No.	Title	Writer(s)	Length
1.	"Le long du large" (Live)		2:41
2.	"Pour un infidèle" (Live)		3:10
3.	"Berceuse" (Live)		2:40
4.	"Playground Love" (Live)	Thomas Croquet, Jean-Benoît Dunckel and Nicolas Godin	2:37
5.	"Comme des enfants" (Live)		3:09
6.	"Ensemble" (Live)		2:14
7.	"Francis" (Live)		2:10

== Charts ==
Chart (2012)	Peak position
Belgian Albums Chart (Wallonia)	51
