= Labyrinthes =

Studio album by Malajube
- Released: February 10, 2009
- Genre: Indie rock
- Length: 38:37
- Label: Dare to Care Records

Malajube chronology
Trompe-l'œil (2006)	Labyrinthes (2009)	La caverne (2011)

Professional ratings
Review scores
Source	Rating
PopMatters	(7/10)
Pitchfork	(6.4/10)

Labyrinthes is the third studio album by Malajube, a Quebec indie rock band. The album was released on February 10, 2009, and is their first studio album since their commercial breakthrough in 2006 with Trompe-l'œil.

Julien Mineau, the band's lead singer and primary songwriter, has described the album's themes as being partly inspired by the continuing role of Roman Catholicism in Québécois society.

The album was shortlisted for the 2009 Polaris Music Prize.

== Music videos ==
On February 6, 2009, Malajube released a video for "Porté disparu", directed by Vincent Morisset, who had also worked with the Montreal band Arcade Fire and City and Colour. The video shows the members of Malajube murdering a fur-coated man (Charles Duval) in various ways, until he reappears to eliminate each band member in the fashion they had used. Bang Bang TV also released a two-part making-of film for the music video prior to its release.

Bande à part recorded a live version of "Hérésie" on January 14, which they broadcast on February 2.

They also released music videos for "Luna" and "Dragon de glace".

== Track listing ==
No.	Title	Length
1.	"Ursuline"	6:46
2.	"Porté disparu"	3:55
3.	"Luna"	2:34
4.	"Casablanca"	3:40
5.	"333"	5:00
6.	"Les collemboles"	4:12
7.	"Hérésie"	1:41
8.	"Dragon de glace"	3:32
9.	"Le tout-puissant"	3:42
10.	"Cristobald"	3:42
