= La Mort Pop Club =

Studio album by We Are Wolves
- Released: February 26, 2013
- Recorded: Mountain City Studio
- Genre: Indie rock
- Length: 34:53
- Label: Dare to Care Records
- Producer: We Are Wolves, Adrian Popovich & Joseph Donovan

We Are Wolves chronology
Invisible Violence (2009)	La Mort Pop Club (2013)

Professional ratings
Review scores
Source	Rating
Voir	3.5/5 stars

La Mort Pop Club is the fourth full-length album by Canadian indie-rock band We Are Wolves, released on February 26, 2013.

== Track listing ==
1. "As the Moon Sets" – 3:17
2. "We Are Made of Fire (Sisyphus)" – 2:50
3. "Night" – 3:04
4. "Sun" – 4:43
5. "Angel" – 2:55
6. "Moving Fast" – 3:39
7. "Snake in the Sand" – 3:24
8. "Mirror" – 2:40
9. "Voices" – 4:41
10. "Sudden Little Death" – 3:40

== Personnel ==
- Pierre-Luc Bégin – drums
- Vincent Lévesque – keyboard, backing vocals
- Alexander Ortiz – vocals, bass, guitar
