= Adieu (Cœur de pirate song) =

Single by Cœur de pirate

from the album Blonde
- Released: March 19, 2011
- Genre: Indie pop
- Length: 2:27
- Label: Grosse Boîte
- Songwriter(s): Béatrice Martin
- Producer(s): Howard Bilerman, Cœur de pirate

Cœur de pirate singles chronology
"Francis" (2010)	"Adieu" (2011)	"Golden Baby" (2012)

"Adieu" is a song by Canadian singer Cœur de pirate, from her second studio album Blonde (2011). It was released as a single in Canada on March 19, 2011.

== Music video ==
The music video for "Adieu" was directed by Jérémie Saindon. The video features Cœur de pirate taking revenge on a cheating lover played by actor Niels Schneider.

== Track listing ==
Digital download

1. "Adieu" – 2:27

== Personnel ==
Credits adapted from Blonde album liner notes.

- Howard Bilerman – producer, recording
- Julien Delfaud – mixing
- Béatrice Martin – vocals, producer
- Marc Thériault – mastering

== Charts ==
Chart (2011)	Peak position
Belgian Singles Chart (Wallonia)	9
French Singles Chart	26
