= 400th anniversary of Quebec City =

Celebration of Québec city's founding

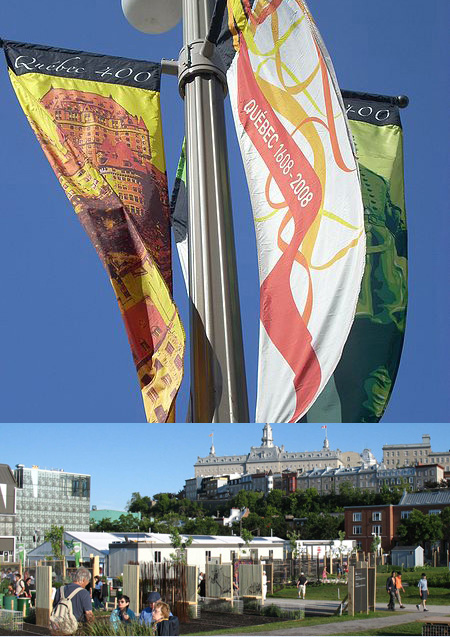
Top: Banners representing the city's 400th anniversary. Bottom: Espace 400e, main location of celebrations.

Quebec City's 400th anniversary, celebrated in 2008, commemorated the founding of Quebec City in 1608 by Samuel de Champlain. Quebec City is the oldest francophone city in North America. Along with Acadia, the city represents the birthplace of French America.

La Société du 400^{e} de Québec, the organization responsible for planning the festivities, was chaired by Daniel Gélinas.

Together, municipal, provincial and federal levels of the Canadian government invested approximately $155 million in the events and infrastructure created for the celebration.

Celebrations took place all over the world. In Canada: Victoria, Vancouver, Edmonton, Calgary, Winnipeg, Regina, Toronto, Ottawa, Gatineau, Montreal, Fredericton, Halifax, Charlottetown, St. John's, Whitehorse, Yellowknife, and Iqaluit; in the United States: Washington, Jamestown, New York, Atlanta, Boston, Chicago, Fort Lauderdale, Lafayette, and Miami; in Argentina: Cordoba, in France: Paris, Bordeaux, Lyon, Reims, La Rochelle, and Brouage (the birthplace of Samuel de Champlain); in Belgium: the Flemish Region, Brussels, Wallonia, and Namur; in Italy: Turin, Rome, and Milan; in the United Kingdom: London.

== History ==
In 1908, Quebec City celebrated its 300th anniversary at a magnitude never before seen in the city. The Prince of Wales, the future King George V, attended the celebrations, which were mainly focussed on the city's military history. One of the lasting legacies was the creation of The Battlefields Park in the heart of the city. The site, approximately 1 km^{2} (0.39 sq mi), includes the Plains of Abraham, the Martello Towers and the Parc des Braves.

On December 1, 1998, after Quebec's second unsuccessful bid to host the Winter Olympics (for the 2002 and 2010 Games), the mayor of Quebec City, Jean-Paul L'Allier, suggested turning the city's efforts towards organizing a celebration in 2008 for the 400th anniversary of the founding of Quebec City.

== Organization of the celebrations ==
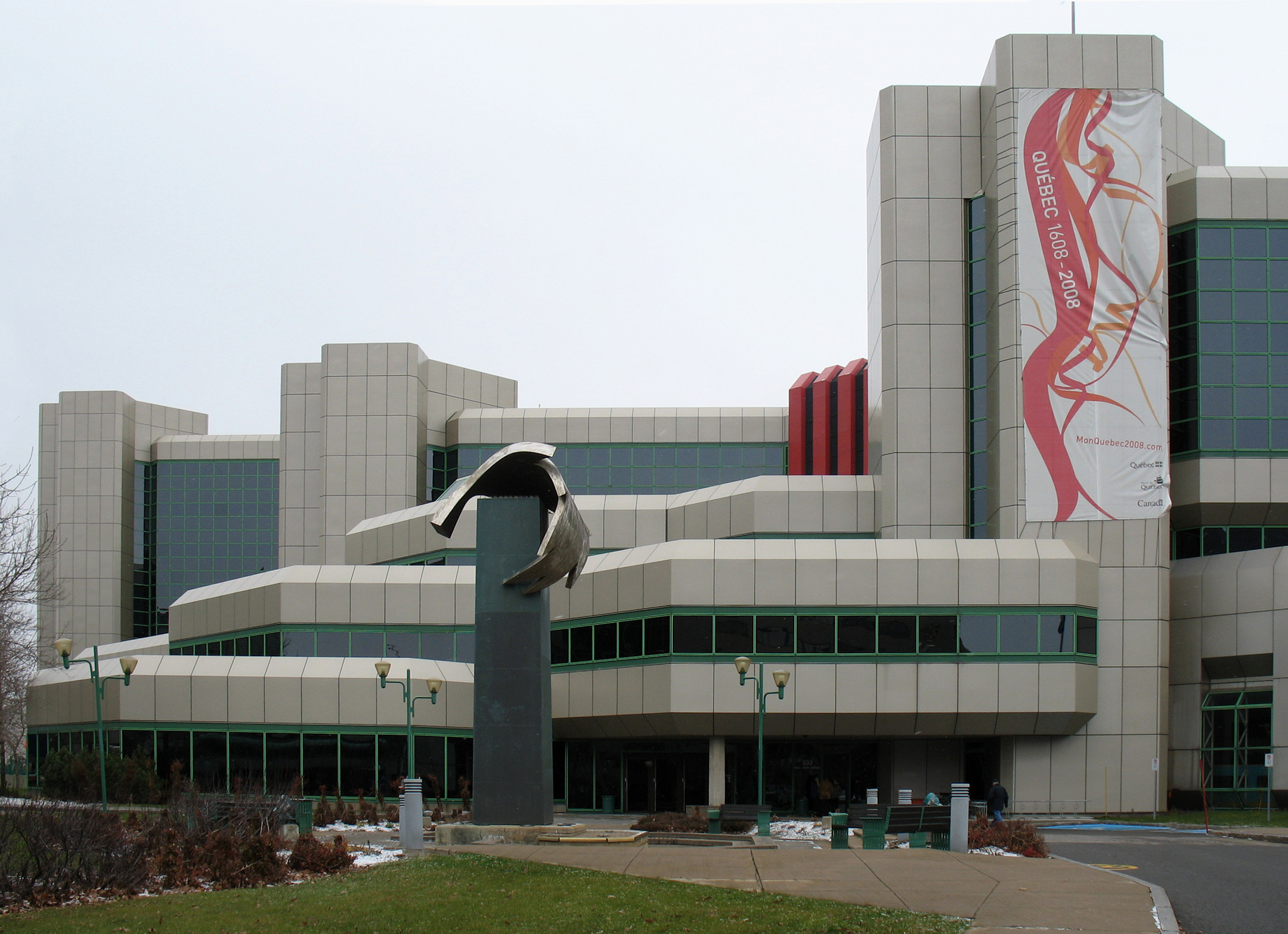
Large banner on the SAAQ building in Quebec City

The Société du 400e anniversaire de Québec (SAAQ) was a non-profit organization responsible for planning the festivities and events during the 400th anniversary of the founding of Quebec City. Their mission included organizing and promoting events and activities, working with other groups and encouraging contributions to and raising funds for the project. Preparations for the celebration began in 2000, when the organization was formed. Locals from Quebec City and regional organizations were invited to a town hall in 2001 to welcome proposals for the celebrations. Between its creation and the end of January 2008, 11 directors left or were dismissed from the organization. On January 2, 2008, Daniel Gélinas, the head of the Quebec City Summer Festival, became the president and chief executive officer of the Société du 400e. After his appointment, many officials were dismissed as part of an organizational restructuring.

A total of 185 full-time employees were hired to cover planning and operational activities leading up to and during the event. They were overseen by a board of directors, as well as four commissioners from the three levels of government and the First Nations community. Approximately 1,500 volunteers devoted nearly 52,000 hours to helping the festivities run smoothly.

Major provincial institutions also created their own programming for the occasion. The Museum of Civilization (now the Canadian Museum of History), the Musée National Des Beaux-Arts du Québec, the Opéra de Québec, and the Orchestre Symphonique de Québec celebrated the 400th anniversary of the city through themed history, art and/or music. Over 2 million visitors participated in the various activities and shows that were offered.

== Funding ==
All three levels of government contributed funding for the events and new infrastructure planned for the celebrations. $140 million was spent on infrastructure: construction of the Promenade Samuel-de-Champlain, creation of Espace 400e and redevelopment of Bassin Brown, Pointe-à-Carcy and Baie de Beauport. Another $65 million went to the Québec City Jean Lesage International Airport to expand its terminal to better accommodate the visitors expected for the celebrations. The Société du 400e received $85 million to organize the festivities: $40 million from the Government of Canada, $40 million from the province of Quebec and $5 million from Quebec City.

Of the $40 million given to the Société by the federal government, $10 million was dedicated to promoting the festival; $9 million was allotted for the development of Espace 400e; $6.6 million to fund the festival from July 3–6 during the actual anniversary; $2.8 million was devoted to fund francophone activities; $2.6 million to create the Moulin à Images (Image Mill); $2.5 million for the opening show Coup d'envoi (The Kick-Off) on December 31, 2007; $1 million for the show Le Chemin qui marche (The Walking Road), and another $1 million for other shows.

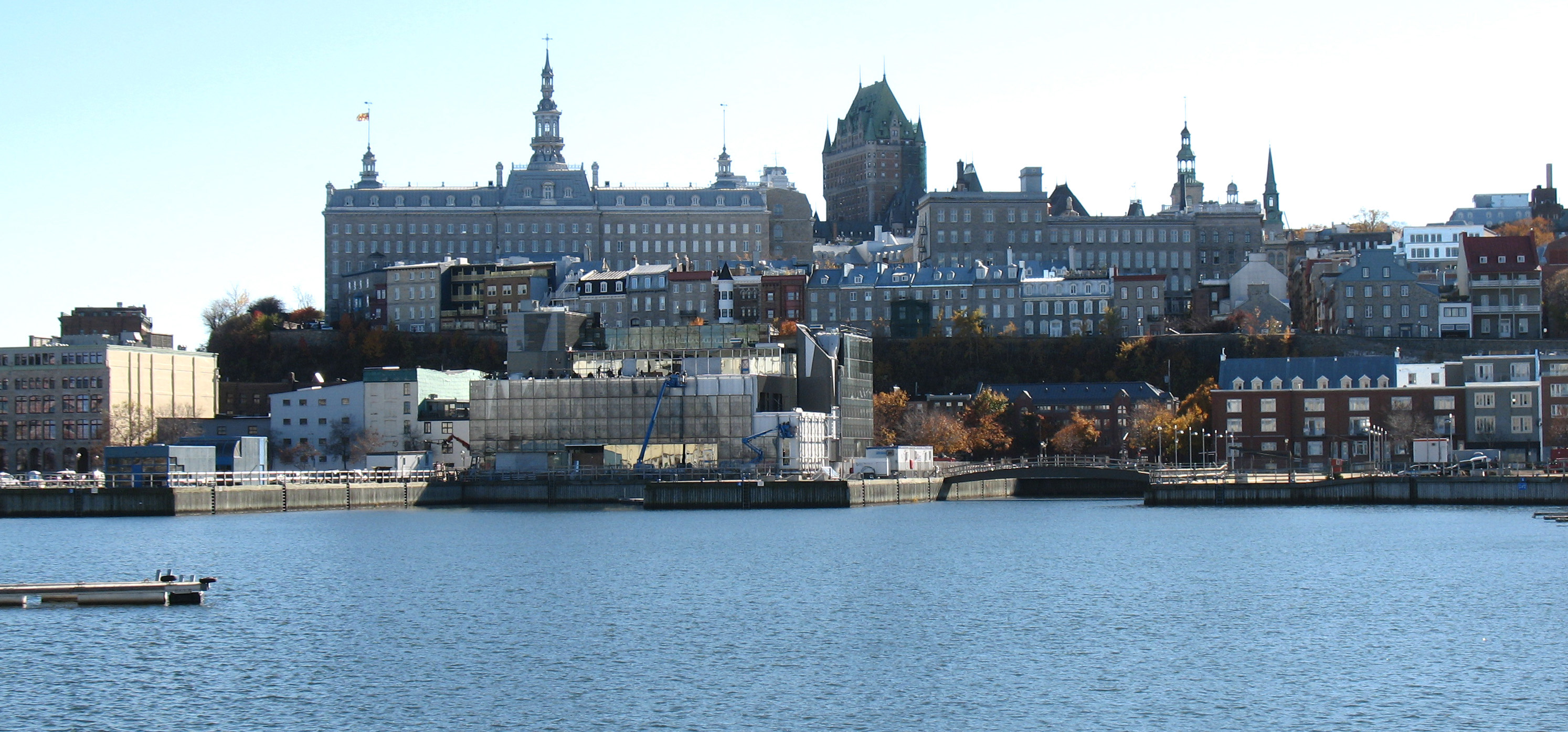
Bassin Louise and Espace 400e under construction in November 2007

The organization had a goal of generating $5 million in revenue through sponsorships, on-site concession and ticket sales, and the sales of official merchandise including food, clothing, household objects, dishes, books, and DVDs. In the end, the Société raised $21 million, most of which was used to add more concerts to the festival schedule and extend the celebrations from the original closing date of October 2008 until the end of the year. Despite receiving money from both provincial and federal levels of government the Société refused to finance Canada Day or Saint-Jean-Baptiste Daycelebrations as part of the 400th anniversary.

== Development and preparation ==
Just as The Battlefields Park was created for the 300th anniversary of Quebec City, several major construction projects were undertaken for the 400th anniversary celebrations.

- Baie de Beauport: Full redevelopment to create a year-round recreational site. The size of the beach was doubled and buildings, sports fields, and pedestrian and cycling paths were added to the site. An effort was made to preserve the natural habitat and provide protected areas for birds. Estimated to cost $19.3 million, the work was completed in the summer of 2008 and paid for by the Government of Canada.
- Bassin Brown: $7.1 million site redevelopment to create an Interpretation Centre and new lookout points with views of the Saint Lawrence River and the city skyline. The site, where British soldiers landed in 1759 during the Battle of the Plains of Abraham, was given back to Quebec City by the Port of Quebec authority, in honour of the city's 400th anniversary. A pedestrian walkway links Bassin Brown with the Upper Town of Old Quebec City.
- Îlot des Palais: $9 million renovation project to build a courtyard and a museum to display archaeological collections. However, the project, announced in 2005 by Quebec City mayor Andrée Boucher, was cancelled in 2007 by Quebec City mayor Régis Labeaume.
- The Plains of Abraham: $4.7 million for the National Battlefields Commission (NBC) to renovate and repair infrastructure at the Plains of Abraham and Parc des Braves.
- Pointe-à-Carcy: $17.4 million contribution from the Canadian government to upgrade the facilities at Pointe-à-Carcy. This included expanding the Agora, an outdoor performance hall, to offer seating for 4061 people.

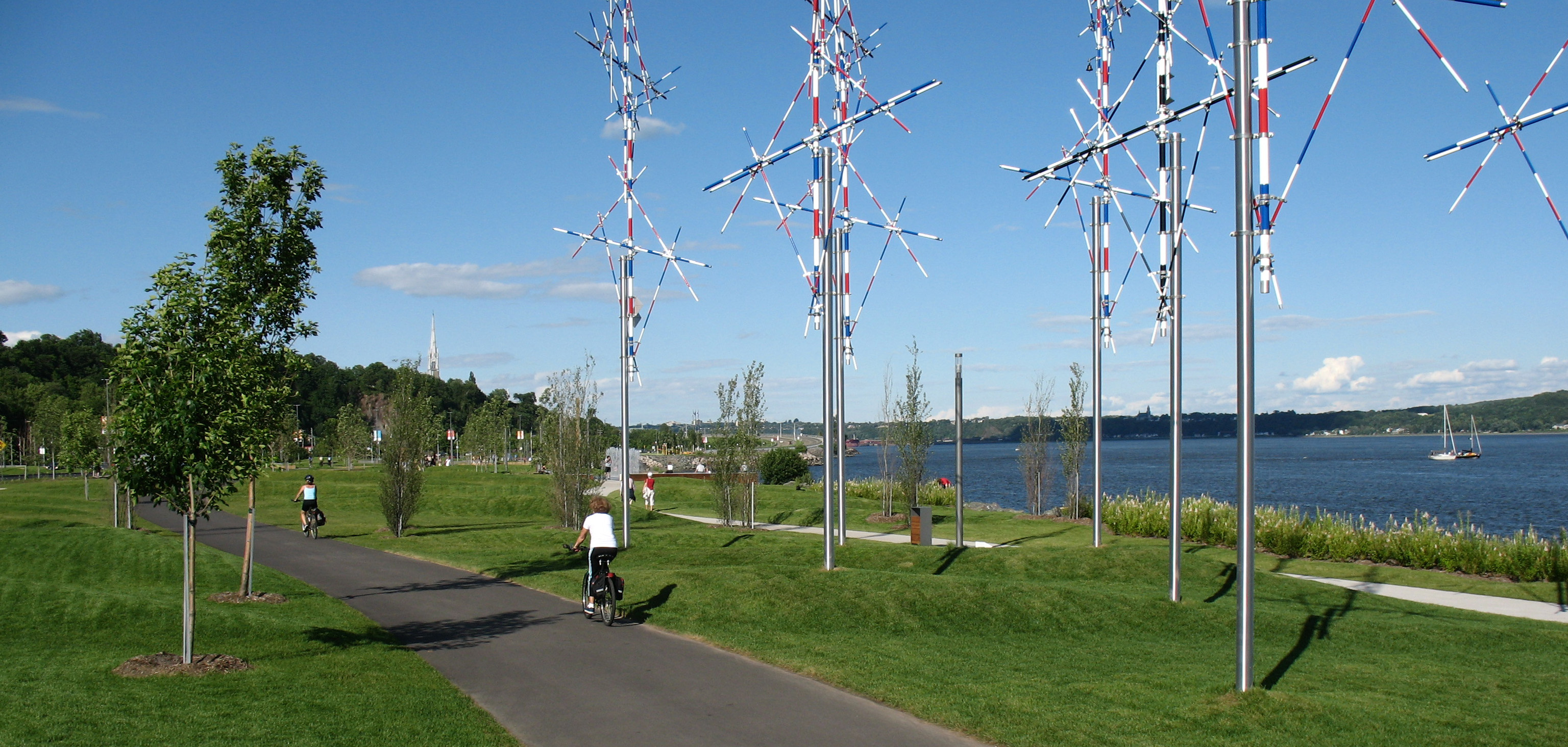
Promenade Samuel-De Champlain

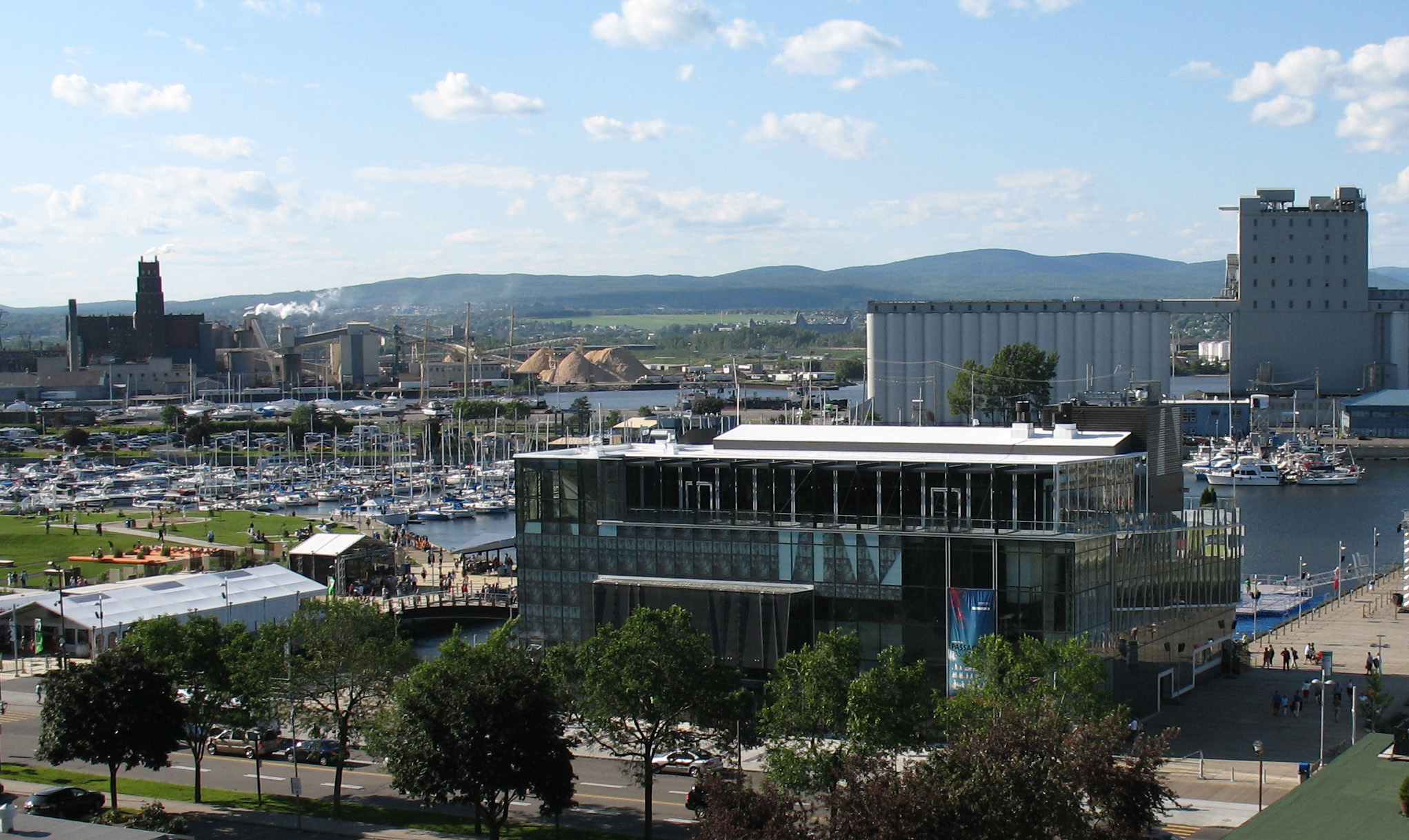
Espace 400^{e} at the Bassin Louise

- Promenade Samuel-De Champlain: $70 million in funding from the Commission de la capitale nationale du Québec to build a 2.5 km (1.6 mi) path on the Saint Lawrence River shoreline, along the boulevard Champlain. Finished in June 2008, it has a multipurpose track, walking trails, a cafe, and washrooms.
- Centre de la francophonie des Amériques: The Centre de la francophonie was inaugurated in December 2008 by Quebec Premier Jean Charest and French President Nicolas Sarkozy. It was designed by French architects Franklin Azzi and Paul-Armand Grether.

=== Espace 400^{e} ===
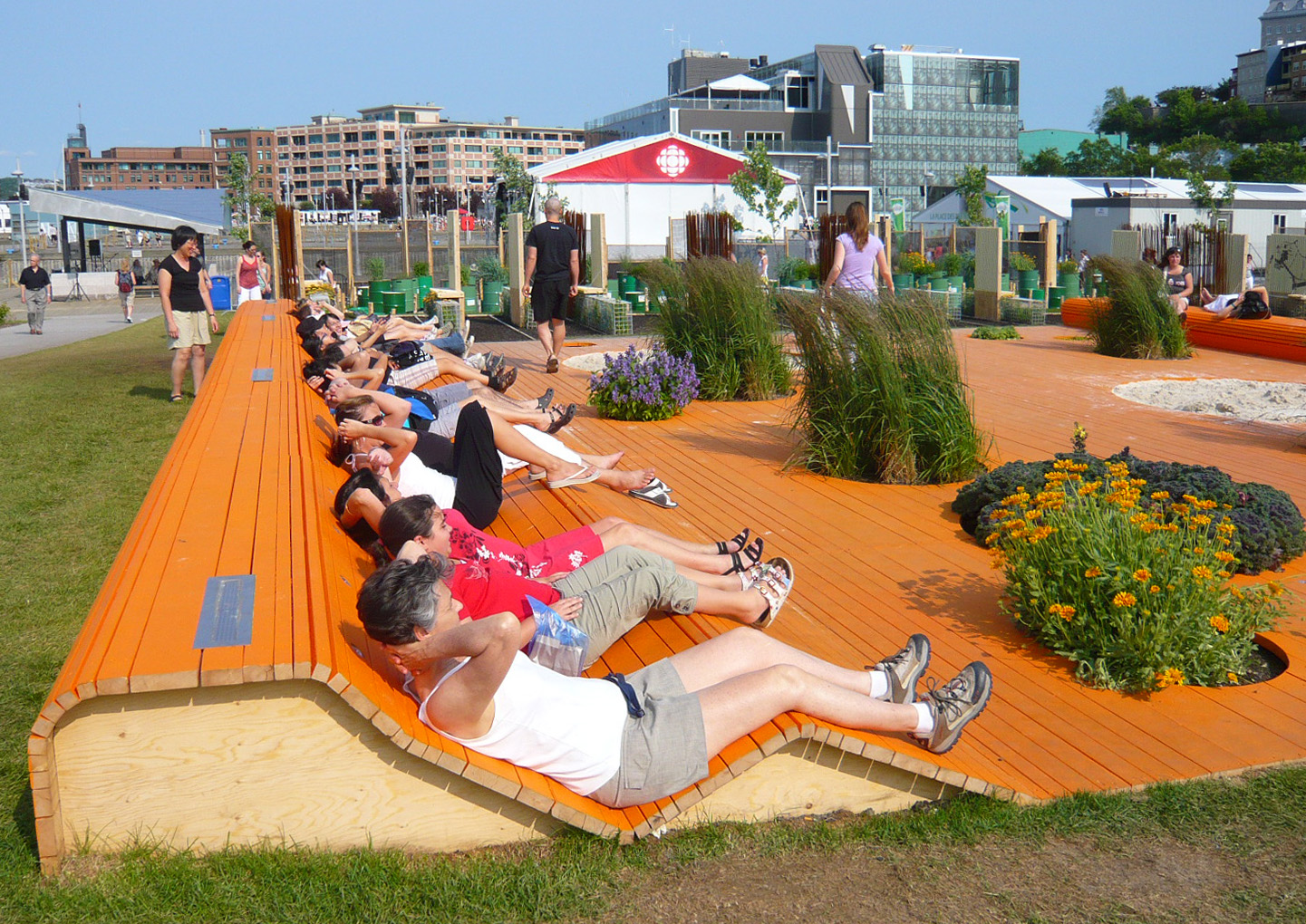
Relaxing at Espace 400^{e}

Located at the Bassin Louise of the Port of Quebec, Espace 400e was the focal point of the festivities celebrating the 400th anniversary of Quebec City where there were various activities, exhibitions, and performances held from June 3 to October 19, 2008. The former Old Port of Quebec Interpretation Centre, a Parks Canada heritage site, was expanded for this celebration through a $24 million investment.

During the summer, various activities took place on the site. Quebec historian Bernard Arcand organized 34 lectures on the history of Quebec City. Various artists, including Ima, Marco Calliari, Les Zapartistes, We Are Wolves, Jérôme Minière, Tokyo Police Club, Maurane, and Philippe Lafontaine, performed at the "Grande Place", a temporary outdoor stage erected near Bassin Louise. There were also two thousand performances by various street artists and daily children's activities organized by La Boîte à Science, a science centre, and Rêves en Stock, Quebec City theatre. First Nations members also organized cultural activities.

Some of the main exhibits included Passagers/Passengers, an interactive installation created by Patrice Sauvé that represented those who have passed through or lived in Quebec City throughout its history, Le Moulin à Images (The Image Mill), an architectural mega projection by Robert Lepage that projected images of the city's history onto Bunge grain silos every night, and the Ephemeral Gardens, which consisted of eleven themed gardens designed and created by artists from Quebec and the rest of Canada, as well as France, the United States, and the United Kingdom.

=== Host nation ===
The Huron-Wendat Nation based in Wendake, a Huron territory within Quebec City, was the host nation for Quebec City's 400th anniversary celebrations. Chief Max Gros-Louis participated in various shows including the Coup d'envoi (The Kickoff) on December 31, 2007. The Wyandot people (also known as Wendats) celebrated the official opening of the Hôtel-Musée de Wendake, both a hotel and museum featuring First Nations artwork, on March 7, 2008. The Assembly of First Nations was held at Wendake in 2008. Various presentations and lectures on indigenous culture took place at Espace 400^{e}. Finally, throughout the summer of 2008, a public performance based on Wendat culture and mythology, Kiugwe (The Great Meeting), took place at Wendake.

== Participation outside of Quebec ==
=== Participation by France ===
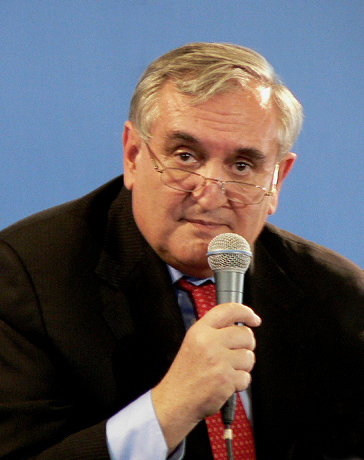
Jean-Pierre Raffarin

France formed its own committee for Quebec City's 400th anniversary celebrations, chaired by Jean-Pierre Raffarin, the Prime Minister of France from 2002 to 2005. The celebrations were seen by France as a "global" event, and the country committed to contributing at least $12 million to the event.

France's contributions included a $2.4 million renovation of the mezzanine and ground floor of the Musée de l'Amérique française (now the Musée de l'Amérique francophone), and an exhibit entitled "Le musée du quai Branly à Québec. Regards sur la diversité culturelle", at the Canadian Museum of Civilization (now the Canadian Museum of History).

=== Participation in other regions ===
Events were also organized in countries other than France, and many Canadian municipalities outside of Quebec participated as well. Great Britain participated in the Ephemeral Gardens, a seasonal exhibit of themed gardens at Espace 400^{e}, and the British Library held a public conference entitled "Québec, Louisiana and the Heritage of French North America", with speakers from Canadian, American, French and British universities. Ireland participated in the cultural events held at Espace 400^{e}, and in Rendez-vous naval de Québec, an exhibit of naval ships held at the Port of Quebec. The involvement of the United States included an exhibition of schooner Lois McClure at the Port of Quebec, as well as the "Québec: Old World Charm, New World Excitement" exhibit featured at the Smithsonian Institution in 2007. In Canada, various events were held in Calgary, Toronto, and Ottawa, while in Edmonton, a free concert in honour of the 400th anniversary took place on June 23, 2008 at the Winspear Centre, featuring Chorale Saint-Jean and the Edmonton Symphony Orchestra as they performed "Je te retrouve" by France Levasseur-Ouimet.

== Major events ==
=== Coup d'Envoi (The Kick-Off) ===
The year 2008 began with an opening ceremony for the anniversary celebrations. The show, entitled Coup d'Envoi (Kick-Off), was directed by Denis Bouchard and was performed outdoors at Place d'Youville from 11:15 p.m. on New Year's Eve until midnight. The celebration organizers described the stage as the biggest one ever assembled, measuring 60 metres (180 ft) wide by 7.6 metres (25 ft) high with many levels. Numerous pyrotechnic and laser effects were used, and images were projected on the snow as blown by a snow cannon. The show touched on issues like the longevity of the French language, the harsh climate, the intermingling of different peoples, and the battles the city had weathered.

The show was made up of seven "movements". The opening number was performed by traditional Quebec music groups Les Batinses and La Bottine souriante, accompanied by 400 "toe-tappers." Afterwards, singers Claire Pelletier, Florence K, and Jessica Vigneault performed several songs related to Quebec City. This was followed by a rap song about streets in Quebec City named after Catholic saints. Gregory Charles who was performing at the Capitol de Québec theatre that night, left his concert briefly to walk through Place d'Youville, and to sing Robert Charlebois' "Si j'avais les ailes d'un ange" (If I Had the Wings of an Angel). Fire eaters and acrobats took to the stage next, followed by comedian Stéphane Rousseau. At Palais Montcalm, Bruno Pelletier, accompanied by the Chœur de Québec and Les Violons du Roy, performed "400 ans de rêves" (400 Years of Dreams), a song created especially for this occasion by songwriter Marc Chabot and composer Jean-Fernand Girard. The countdown to the New Year was accompanied by fireworks. Pascale Picard closed the show.

Some media reports criticized the organizers for waiting too long to reveal the content of the show, since the official line-up was not announced until several weeks before the show was to take place.

There was a considerably larger crowd than the organizers anticipated. They anticipated 15,000 people, the capacity of Place D'Youville; however, over 50,000 people wanted to attend. This meant that many people had problems accessing the site and thousands of spectators were forced to gather in front of the National Assembly of Quebec instead. Despite the great turnout, several criticisms made of the show included: some disorganization, a few minutes' delay in the New Year's countdown, a lack of real security and crowd control, faulty sound and visual systems, questionable musical choices for the show, and a lack of a clear link between the various performances. Presented as a success by organizers and mayor Régis Labeaume, the show was also enjoyed by numerous participants. Daniel Gélinas became president and chief executive officer of the Société du 400e shortly after the Coup d'Envoi event took place. Despite the criticism, the event was carried out within the allotted $2.5 million budget.

=== Parcours 400 ans chrono (400-Year Journey) ===
In early January 2008, artistic director Nancy Bernier led 150 artists from Quebec City in creating Parcours 400 ans chrono (400-Year Journey), a large artistic installation stretching across 0.9 km (0.56 mi) of the city during the evenings of January 5 and 6. Spectators could stroll around 13 different stations that told the history of Quebec organized by theme at various locations, including the National Assembly of Quebec, Parc de l'Esplanade, Porte Kent, Porte Saint-Jean, the Maison Dauphine, the former pub Le d'Auteuil, and the Artillery Park Heritage Site. One station featured actors reciting the poetry of local poets, another displayed statements historical figures had made about Quebec City. At another station, fire-eaters performed beside projected images of historical fires that had ravaged Quebec City, while another highlighted events from the war in Quebec City, and a third used projections onto packed snow to showcase the scientific and technological achievements of Quebecers. There was also an ice slide towards Artillery Park, leading to a dance floor and an ice bar. The event kept within its $800,000 budget.

Approximately 20,000 people took part in the event, after waiting up to three hours to participate.

=== Parade ===
A military parade organized by the Canadian Forces marking the anniversary took place on 3 July. It took place in chronological order, beginning with a contingent from the First Nations and ending with contemporary troops. The parade was in the following order:

- First Nations
- Samuel de Champlain
- Company of One Hundred Associates
- Colonial Militia
- Carignan-Salières Regiment
- Compagnies Franches de la Marine (two groups)
- Les Canonniers Bombardiers de Québec
- Les Miliciens et Réguliers de Montcalm
- James Rogers Company, Rogers' Rangers
- Montcalm and Wolfe
- 8th Fraser Highlanders
- Régiment de la Sarre
- Régiment de Béarn
- 60th Royal American Regiment
- King's Rangers (Rogers' Rangers)
- Von Barner Light Infantry Regiment
- Les Voltigeurs de Québec
- South Wales Borderers
- Les Coureurs des bois
- Boer War units
- First World War units
- 425th Squadron (Lancaster Team)
- 1st Canadian Parachute Battalion
- Régiment de la Chaudière
- United Nations Peacekeepers
- National Band of the Naval Reserve (led by Colonel Eric Tremblay)
- HMCS Ville de Québec
- HMCS Montcalm
- 5th Light Artillery Regiment
- Royal Canadian Dragoons
- 12e Régiment blindé du Canada
- 5 Combat Engineer Regiment
- 71st Communications Group
- Signal Corps Headquarters
- Royal Canadian Regiment
- Royal 22nd Regiment (1st, 2nd and 3rd battalions)
- 34 Canadian Brigade Group
- 35 Canadian Brigade Group
- 425th Tactical Fighter Squadron
- 430th Tactical Fighter Helicopter Squadron
- 2nd Patrol Ranger Group
- 5th Service Battalion
- La Musique du Royal 22e Régiment
- 5th Field Ambulance
- 5th Military Police Unit
- National Support Element
- International Security Assistance Force (ISAF)
- RCMP
- Sûreté du Québec
- Family Centre Valcartier
- RCMP Musical Ride

== Associated programming ==
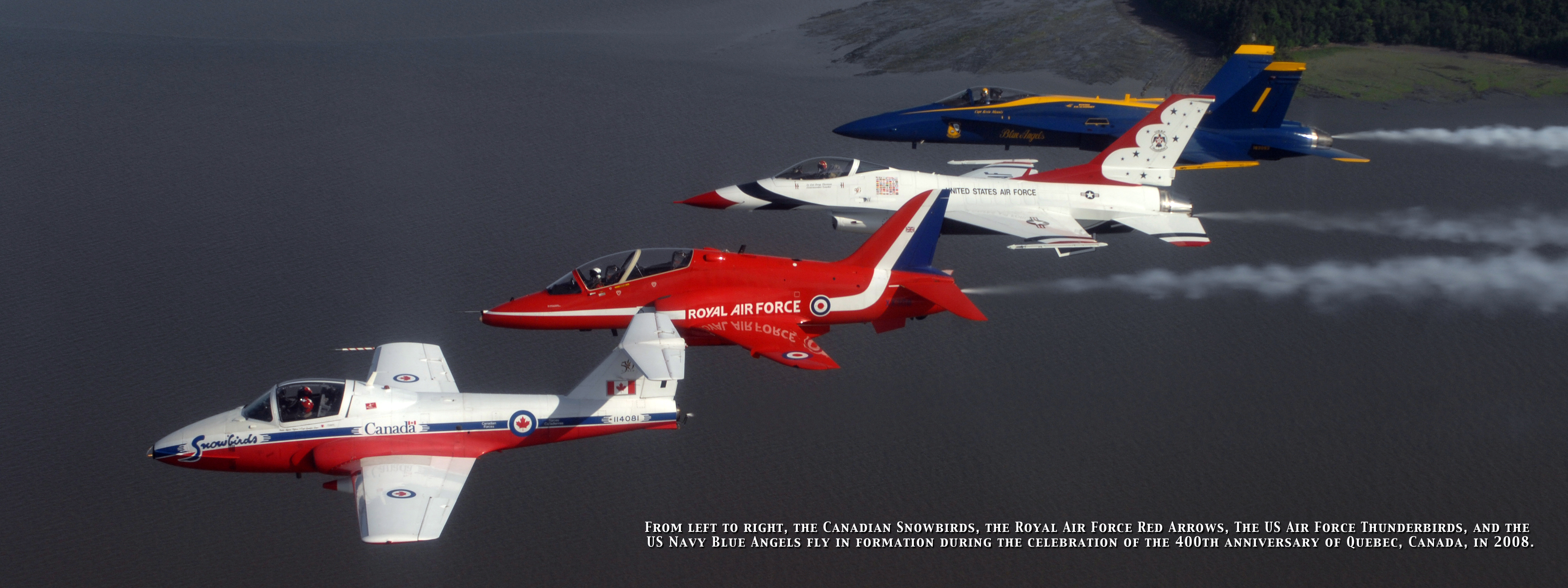
Quebec International Airshow in June 2008

Special events related to the 400th anniversary were also incorporated into major events held in Quebec City in 2008, including the Quebec Winter Carnival, the Quebec International Air Show, Red Bull Crashed Ice, the Quebec City Summer Festival, the Men's World Hockey Championships, the Eucharist Congress, the Winter Triathlon, and the Francophonie Summit. Free performances were scheduled featuring Celine Dion, Paul McCartney, the Cirque du Soleil, and various Quebec artists.
