= Blonde (Cœur de pirate album) =

Studio album by Cœur de pirate
- Released: November 7, 2011
- Genre: Pop
- Length: 36:08
- Label: Grosse Boîte
- Producer: Howard Bilerman

Cœur de pirate chronology
Cœur de pirate (2008)	Blonde (2011)	Roses (2015)

Singles from Blonde
- 1. "Adieu" Released: September 12, 2011; 2. "Golden Baby" Released: February 27, 2012; 3. "Place de la république"

Blonde is the second studio album by female Quebec singer-songwriter Béatrice Martin, released under her stage name Cœur de pirate, on November 7, 2011. It featured a musical shift from the primarily piano-based sound of Martin's first record into a more "retro-pop" sound, inspired heavily by the music and style of the 1960s.

Blonde was well received by critics, and was nominated for Francophone Album of the Year at the 2012 Juno Awards and longlisted for the 2012 Polaris Music Prize. The album also reached number 1 in Quebec, number 5 in France, and number 2 in the French part of Belgium, and was certified gold in both Canada and Belgium.

== Background ==
Blonde is Martin's second studio album and follows her 2008 self-titled debut, which launched her career and transformed her from "the invisible teenager to a bit of a star" in both Quebec and France. In September 2010, Martin was featured on "Brutal Hearts" on the Bedouin Soundclash album Light the Horizon, which was praised by Exclaim! as a "surprise standout" of the album. In February 2011, Martin and Bedouin Soundclash singer Jay Malinowski collaborated under the name Armistice to release a five-song self-titled EP. The album's "blaring horns, woozy strings and skipping rhythm" was described as "aural equivalent of [a] dusty desert", already reflecting a change in Martin's music.

== Production ==
Martin co-produced Blonde with Montreal's Howard Bilerman, known for his previous work with Arcade Fire and Basia Bulat, and recorded all but one of the album's songs in his Montreal studio, Hotel2Tango. She chose to work with Bilerman based on his experience with folk music, and though her album "didn't turn out that way" she praised him for "[seeing] things in my songs that other people don't see". In addition, Martin worked with Edmonton singer-songwriter Michael Rault in order to achieve a more "sixties sound". The album production was praised for "hold[ing] back" on arrangements and not going "over-the-top orchestral" on the tracks "Cap-Diamant" and "Place de la République".

== Music and lyrics ==
Blonde displays a stylistic change from Martin's first album, which was characterized primarily by a piano-based sound. Stating that the instrument was previously "the skeleton to all of my songs", she wanted to show that she was "actually more of a singer-songwriter than just the girl and the piano", though she clarifies that the change was not an attempt to disassociate herself from her first album but rather an "evolution" of her sound.

Many reviewers noted a contrast between the positive and cheerful tone of the music and the relatively "heavy subjects" and even negative subjects of the lyrics. As one critic expressed, "there's a melancholy that lingers just beneath the surface... even though sonically the album is arguably one of the happiest, swingy-iest, warmest kiss-offs yet".

The album was inspired stylistically by the work of numerous artists, especially from the 1960s, which led one reviewer to describe Martin's music as "straddl[ing] a line between dated and timeless" The album draws inspiration from the genres surf rock and yé-yé, and specifically the music of France Gall, Serge Gainsbourg, The Zombies, Nancy Sinatra and Lee Hazlewood.

Lyrically, the album focuses on what Martin describes as "all the seasons of a relationship, from when you meet someone to the break up and whatever happens after", including "loving from a distance". This is referenced directly in the title of the album, Blonde, a double entendre that refers not only to Martin's blonde hair but also to the slang word for "girlfriend" in Quebec French.

== Songs ==
=== Tracks 1–6 ===
The album opens with "Lève les voiles", which roughly translates to "Raise the Sails" or '"Set Sail", an a cappella song written in a traditional style. Though the words and melody were written by Martin, she does not sing on the track, which features instead singers from the boys' choir Les Petits Chanteurs de Laval (Young Singers of Laval) and the girls' choir Les Voix Boréales (Boreal Voices), directed by Philippe Ostiguy. Martin's inspiration for the song came from her own years in elementary school where she "had to sing traditional songs that meant nothing". Though the unaccompanied choral sound of the song is described as somewhat "musically incongruous" with the rest of the album, its lyrics of freedom and "setting sail onto new ways" set a tone for the rest of the album.

"Adieu" ("Farewell"), is a 1960s-inspired pop song, featuring a double bassline and "stomping" percussion in the vein of Bo Diddley. It was released as the album's first single on September 19 and topped CBC Radio 3's The R3-30 singles chart for two consecutive weeks in November. Lyrically, "Adieu" deals with what Martin describes as the phase of "the break-up where you really just want the other person to disappear... you want to stop thinking about them", though she also clarifies that "it's a general break-up song, it doesn't talk about one person in particular". A music video for the song, directed by Jérémie Saindon, features Niels Schneider as Martin's boyfriend whose infidelity provokes her to enact revenge on his various partners, and eventually him as well. The concept was inspired by the 1960s sitcom Bewitched and styled with touches of both retro and modern.

The third song on the album, "Danse et danse", features a "wonderfully groovy" melody with a "dramatic tango" feel, backed by strings and a "thumping" beat. Lyrically, it deals with what Martin describes her generation's tendency to "try to numb ourselves" and move on after a break-up by "sleeping with different people but not really caring about them", alluded to in the refrain with the phrase "Mais danse et danse sans que j'aie à t'aimer / Je ne t'aurai plus quand ce sera demain" ("But dance and dance without me having to love you / I will no longer have you tomorrow").

"Loin d'ici", meaning "far from here", is a duet sung by Martin and Juno Award-winning singer-songwriter Sam Roberts. Featuring acoustic, electric, and slide guitar, it has a distinctly country feel that prompted one reviewer to compare it to the sound of Martin's side project Armistice. The contrast between Martin's "softness" and Robert's "rough, dusty gruffness" was praised as complementary and "subtle and distracting in the best way imaginable".

=== Tracks 7–12 ===
"Place de la République" is a slow, "melancholy" song with a similar sound to Martin's debut album, featuring her vocals with a piano and an "emotive" and "subdued chamber-pop string adornment". Its name comes from the public square of the same name in Paris. Written almost immediately after the release of her first album, Martin said that it "became a symbol for whatever I was feeling afterwards ... It was defining for me". After adding it to her regular performance repertoire, the song was well known by Martin's fans and became a catalyst for Blonde; as Martin stated during an interview on the radio show Q:

This album is only here today because I wanted to record 'Place de la République' ... I just had to record it for the fans, if anything ... I mean, I've got people that like my music now, so, I might as well do this, I might as well release a record.

Named for Cap Diamant ("Cape Diamond"), the promontory on which Quebec City is located, the song "Cap-Diamant" is a piano-driven track that features Martin's vocals.

Co-written by Martin and Malinowski, "Saint-Laurent" is named for the boulevard of the same name, a major commercial street and heritage site in Montreal.

== Release ==
The album's first single, "Adieu", was released on September 12, 2011, along with a music video. The album itself was released on November 14, 2011 with a launch concert at the Rialto Theatre in Montreal. The second single, "Golden Baby", was released on February 27, 2012 along with an accompanying music video released shortly after.

=== Deluxe edition ===
A deluxe edition of the album was released concurrent with the standard edition in a limited run of 5000 copies. The edition includes a small hardcover book of about 30 pages, the album CD with two bonus tracks ("Hôtel Amour" and "Prince-Arthur"), and a collection of photographs and images. Designed by Catherine D'Amours with photography was by Clara Palardy, the package was awarded the 2012 Concours Grafika grand prix for best CD/DVD packaging design in Quebec.

== Reception ==
Professional ratings
Review scores
Source	Rating
Allmusic	4/5 stars
The Gazette (Montreal)	4/5 stars
Hour Community	3.5/5 stars
Mezzic	7.7/10
PopMatters	9/10 stars
Voir	3.5/5 stars

Blonde was well received by music critics, who described it as "sophisticated", "enjoyable", "radiat[ing] with jubilance and youthful verve" and containing "beautiful songs and dreamy delivery".

Martin was mostly praised for progressing beyond the simple, piano-centric sound of her first record. Allmusic called the album as "a brave leap forward from a hugely gifted songwriter" and "perhaps one of the most enchanting and authentic retro-pop efforts of the year", while Bernard Perusse at The Gazette wrote that she "continues to develop an enchanting artistic voice of her own" and "makes few false moves" with the album, concluding that "it would be a mistake to bet against her ultimately becoming a bona fide pop treasure". In his review of the album for PopMatters, critic Stuart Henderson made similar remarks, commenting:

Blonde is, overall, a very fun, very amusing record. It has a jumping-around-singing-into-your-hairbrush kind of girlish abandon to it that is utterly compelling... Yet, for all of this effervescence, a superior or more tightly constructed series of pop tracks hasn't appeared this year, for my money.

However, one reviewer did express a desire for "more emphasis on [Martin's] extraordinary piano playing" and hoped that "on her third release she embraces that instrumental talent more and it isn't tossed aside for pure pop".

=== Awards and year-end rankings ===
Blonde was named the best francophone album of 2011 by the Canadian iTunes Store, voted the 22nd best album of the year by the music critics at Voir and ranked fourth by Now magazine music editor Michael Hollett on his list of the top ten discs of 2011.

Blonde was nominated for the Francophone album of the year at the 2012 Juno Awards, and was also named as a longlisted nominee for the 2012 Polaris Music Prize on June 14, 2012.

=== Commercial performance ===
Blonde reached number 1 in the charts in Quebec and on the Canadian iTunes Store album chart, while in Europe it peaked at number 5 in France and number 2 in Wallonia, the predominantly French-speaking region of Belgium.

== Track listing ==
1. "Lève les voiles" – 1:12
2. "Adieu" – 2:27
3. "Danse et danse" – 3:10
4. "Golden Baby" – 3:07
5. "Ava" – 3:16
6. "Loin d'ici" – 2:43
7. "Les amours dévouées" – 2:27
8. "Place de la République" – 4:11
9. "Cap Diamant" – 2:43
10. "Verseau" – 3:53
11. "Saint-Laurent" – 3:14
12. "La petite mort" – 3:45

iTunes-only bonus track

13. "Hôtel Amour" – 2:18

Deluxe edition bonus tracks

13. "Hôtel Amour" – 2:18
14. "Prince-Arthur" – 3:05

== Charts ==
Chart (2012)	Peak position
Austrian Albums Chart	62
Belgian Albums Chart (Flanders)	72
Belgian Albums Chart (Wallonia)	2
Canadian Albums Chart	5
French Albums Chart	5
German Albums Chart	52
Swiss Albums Chart	25

=== Year-end charts ===
Chart (2012)	Position
Belgian Albums Chart (Wallonia)	42

=== Certifications ===
Region	Certification	Certified units/sales
Belgium (BEA)	Gold	10,000^{*}
Canada (Music Canada)	Platinum	80,000^{^}
France (SNEP)	Platinum	170,000
^{*} Sales figures based on certification alone.^{^} Shipments figures based on certification alone.
