= Economic spin-off =

The term economic spin-off is widely used in popular media to describe the potential secondary economic effects of project or development. This may reflect a real phenomenon, especially when used looking back into the past, where the results are measurable, though still subject to rival interpretations. More often, however, it is used by proponents of a particular project to speculate or promote their favoured project.

An example of the former (measuring past results) would include a report in the activities surrounding the 400th Anniversary of Quebec City, which claimed that the festivities created 8,742 person-years of employment (jobs) C$438 million of value added.

Examples of the latter (making claims to support a project) include the following: A 2003 presentation by the Caribbean Tourism Organization supporting the 2007 Cricket World Cup. A new public bus service promote by the Société de transport de l’Outaouais suggests that a new bus service will promote urban development and more localized consumption along the route.

== See also ==
- Economic impact analysis
- Fiscal multiplier
- Spillover (economics)
