= La caverne (album) =

Studio album by Malajube
- Released: April 13, 2011
- Genre: Indie rock
- Length: 32:45
- Label: Dare to Care Records

Malajube chronology
| Labyrinthes (2009) | La caverne (2011) |

Professional ratings
Review scores
| Source | Rating |
|---|---|
| Pitchfork | (7/10) |

La caverne is the fourth studio album by the Quebec indie rock band Malajube, released on April 13, 2011.

The album was a longlisted nominee for the 2011 Polaris Music Prize and won the 2012 Juno Award for Francophone Album of the Year.

== Music videos ==
Music videos have been released for "Synesthésie" and "Le blizzard".

== Track listing ==
| No. | Title | Length |
|---|---|---|
| 1. | "Synesthésie" | 2:53 |
| 2. | "Cro-Magnon" | 3:35 |
| 3. | "La caverne" | 2:49 |
| 4. | "Sangsues" | 3:46 |
| 5. | "Mon oeil" | 2:44 |
| 6. | "Le blizzard" | 3:03 |
| 7. | "Radiologie" | 2:54 |
| 8. | "Ibuprofène" | 2:40 |
| 9. | "Le stridor" | 3:32 |
| 10. | "Chienne folle" | 4:49 |
