= Invisible Violence =

Studio album by We Are Wolves
- Released: October 6, 2009
- Genre: Indie rock
- Length: 45:16
- Label: Dare to Care Records

We Are Wolves chronology
Total Magique (2007)	Invisible Violence (2009)	La Mort Pop Club (2013)

Professional ratings
Review scores
Source	Rating
Now	4/5 stars
Voir	4/5 stars
Vue Weekly	3/5 stars
"Pitchfork"	(5.8/10)

Invisible Violence is the third full-length album by Canadian indie-rock band We Are Wolves, released on October 6, 2009. The song 'Holding Hands' was also featured in the soundtrack on Gran Turismo 5 released in 2010.

== Track listing ==
1. "Paloma" - 4:39
2. "Holding Hands" - 2:28
3. "Walking Commotion" - 4:34
4. "Dreams" - 3:16
5. "Vague" - 3:14
6. "Reaching for the Sky" - 5:28
7. "Me as Enemy" - 2:41
8. "Blue" - 3:45
9. "Near Fear" - 3:49
10. "La Rue oblique" - 5:54
11. "The Spectacle of Night" - 3:24
12. "Bounty Waterfalls" - 1:59
