= Trompe-l'oeil (album) =

Trompe-l'œil

Studio album by Malajube
- Released: February 7, 2006
- Recorded: October–December 2005
- Genre: Indie rock
- Length: 49:58
- Label: Dare to Care Records
- Producer: Ryan Battistuzzi

Malajube chronology
Le Compte complet (2004)	Trompe-l'œil (2006)	Labyrinthes (2009)

Professional ratings
Review scores
Source	Rating
Allmusic	3.5/5 stars

Trompe-l'œil is the second album by the indie rock band Malajube, released in 2006 on Dare to Care Records. The album is inspired in part by medical themes; in the album's liner notes, each song is given a subtitle relating to some aspect of physical or mental health.

== Critical reception ==
Unusual for a French language album from Quebec, the album received significant critical attention in both English Canada and the United States, including airplay on CBC Radio 3 and a favourable review on Pitchfork Media.

The album was also shortlisted for the 2006 Polaris Music Prize. It was the first francophone album to be on that award's shortlist.

== Music videos ==
They have released music videos for "Montréal -40°C", "Pâte Filo", "Le Crabe", "Ton Plat Favori", "Fille à plumes" and "Étienne D'Août".

== Track listing ==
Thematic subtitles for each track in parentheses, per the liner notes

All lyrics are written by Malajube, except where noted; all music is composed by Malajube

No.	Title	Lyrics	Length
1.	"Jus De Canneberges"	Julien Mineau and Virginie Parr	0:58
2.	"Montréal -40°C"		3:20
3.	"Pâte Filo"		3:45
4.	"Le Crabe"	Julien Mineau, Thomas Augustin and Virginie Parr	4:43
5.	"La Monogamie"		4:57
6.	"Ton Plat Favori"		2:32
7.	"La Russe"	Loco Locass	1:45
8.	"Fille à Plumes"		3:42
9.	"Casse-Cou"		4:06
10.	"Étienne D'Août"		5:27
11.	"St-Fortunat"		3:46
12.	"La Fin"		10:53
13.	"Le Grand Galion (hidden track)"

"Le Grand Galion" starts at 8:52 into "La Fin".

=== Étienne d'août single ===
No.	Title	Length
1.	"Étienne D'Août" (radio edit)	4:11
2.	"M. Pupille"	3:59
3.	"Fille à Plumes" (remix)	3:18
4.	"Elton D'Août" (remix maman)	5:12
Total length:		16:40

== Guest musicians ==
- "Jus De Canneberges" - Ryan Battistuzzi on guitar, Catherine Lesaunier on cello and Martine Gaumond on violin
- "Montréal -40°C" - Pierre Lapointe, Martin Pelland and Simon Proulx on vocals, Valérie Jodoin-Keaton on western concert flute and vocals, Ryan Battistuzzi on guitar and Joe des Breast on maracas
- "Pâte Filo" - Ryan Battistuzzi on slide guitar, Catherine Lesaunier on cello and Martine Gaumond on violin
- "Le Crabe" - Valérie Jodoin-Keaton on vocals
- "La Monogamie" - Valérie Jodoin-Keaton and Virginie Parr on vocals and Ryan Battistuzzi on slide guitar
- "Ton Plat Favori" - Valérie Jodoin-Keaton on vocals.
- "La Russe" - Loco Locass on vocals.
- "Casse-cou" - Valérie Jodoin-Keaton on western concert flute and vocals and Ryan Battistuzzi on guitar
- "Étienne D'Août" - Catherine Lesaunier on cello and Martine Gaumond on violin

== In popular culture ==
- The song "Fille à plume" was used on EA Sports Rugby 08, and was used for a video compilation of the 2003 IRB Rugby World Cup.
