= Loud (rapper) =

Canadian rapper (born 1988)

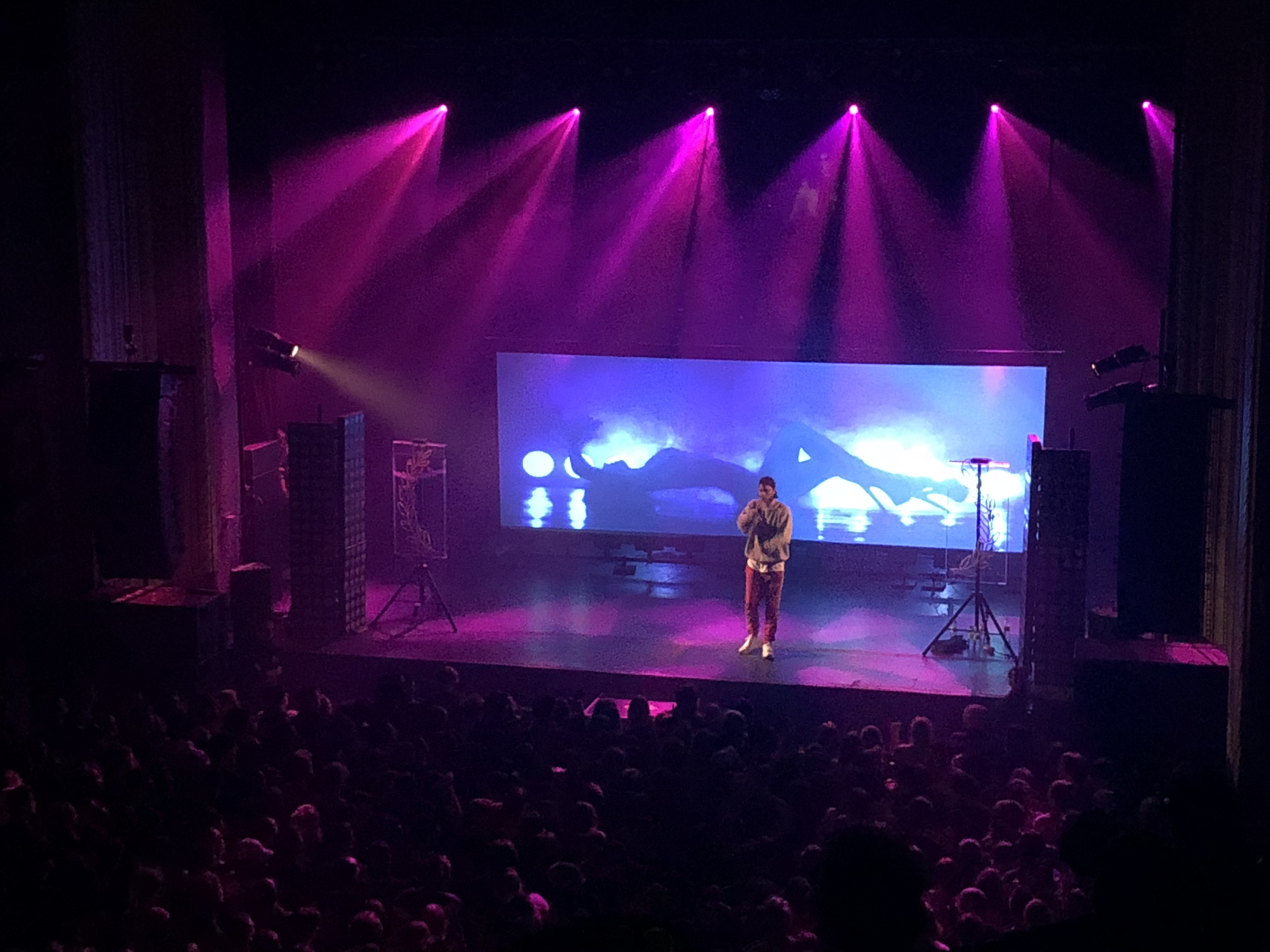
- Loud performing in Montreal - Mtelus

Background information
- Born: Simon Cliche Trudeau; February 17, 1988 (age 38); Montreal, Quebec, Canada
- Genres: Hip hop, pop rap
- Occupations: Rapper, songwriter
- Instrument: Vocals
- Years active: 2012-present
- Label: Joy Ride Records
- Website: www.uneanneerecord.com

Loud is the stage name of Simon Cliche Trudeau, a Canadian rapper from Quebec. He is a relationship with actress Catherine St-Laurent.

Formerly associated with the band Loud Lary Ajust, he released his debut solo recording Une année record in 2017. His tour to support the album included his first concert performances in France, resulting in positive attention from the influential French music magazine Les Inrockuptibles.

In 2018, he collaborated with Cœur de pirate on the track "Dans la nuit" from her album En cas de tempête, ce jardin sera fermé. In the same year he won the SOCAN Songwriting Prize in 2018 for his song "56K" and the Prix Félix for Hip Hop Album of the Year, and received a longlist nomination for the 2018 Polaris Music Prize. At the Juno Awards of 2019, Une année record won the Juno Award for Francophone Album of the Year.

His second album, Tout ça pour ça, was released in 2019, and was longlisted for the 2019 Polaris Music Prize. The album earned Loud his second nomination for Francophone Album of the Year at the Juno Awards of 2020.

== Biography ==
=== Early career ===
Loud began his music career using the name Loudmouth/Loud Mouth (2008-2012), a name he chose when he was 14 while participating WordUp! rap battles. In high school, he met Laurent Fortier-Brassard (better known by his stage name, Lary). Alongside Lary and producer Ajust (Alex Guay), Loud went on to form the group Loud Lary Ajust. Separating in 2016, Loud went on to begin a solo career with his first EP, titled New Phone, which contained four songs including 56K.

=== First album: Une année record ===
On November 3, 2017, Loud released his first full-length album titled Une année record. The success of this album led to Loud's first concert in France to a sold-out venue. During 2018, he toured throughout Quebec and France. On April 30, 2018, Loud was invited to the French show Quotidien to talk about the album. His single Toutes les femmes savent danser became a huge hit with the general public and became the first Quebecois rap song to reach the top of the BDS prize list, a compilation of top radio songs put together by l'ADISQ.

In June 2018, Loud collaborated with Cœur de pirate to release the song Dans la nuit.

On April 26, 2019, a year and a half after its release, Une année record was certified gold by Music Canada. The singles Nouveaux riches and Devenir immortel (et puis mourir) were also certified gold. Toutes les femmes savent danser was certified platinum, a first for a rapper from Quebec.

=== Second album: Tout ça pour ça ===
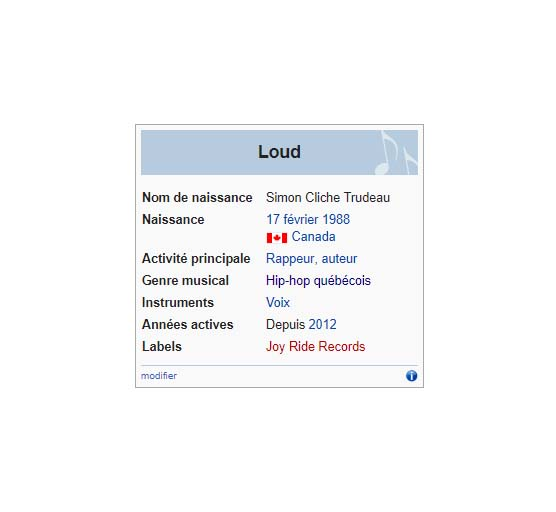
Album cover art for Tout ça pour ça (2019)

On May 24, 2019, Loud released his second album titled Tout ça pour ça. The release event, held a week later on May 31, 2019, drew over 8,000 fans to the Bell Centre in Montreal. A screenshot of Loud's French Wikipedia article's infobox was used as the cover art for the album.

The album includes a duet with Charlotte Cardin on the track "Sometimes, All the Time", which blends both English and French lyrics.

In June 2019, the album was long-listed for a 2019 Polaris Music Prize.

== Awards and nominations ==
- 2019 : Male Artist of the Year (Prix Félix)
- 2019 : Francophone Album of the Year (Prix Juno)
- 2018 : Quebecois artist the most popular outside of Quebec (Prix Félix)
- 2018 : Hip-Hop Album of the Year (Prix Félix)
- 2018 : Album of the Year Producer - with Marc Vincent and Alex Guay (Prix Félix)
- 2018 : Song Award - volet francophone (SOCAN)
