= Le compte complet =

Le Compte Complet

Studio album by Malajube
- Released: November 2, 2004
- Genre: Indie rock
- Length: 29:31
- Label: Dare to Care Records
- Producer: Martin Pelland

Malajube chronology
Le Compte Complet (2004)	Trompe-l'oeil (2006)

Le Compte complet is the first album by the Canadian indie rock band Malajube. It was released in 2004 and produced by Martin Pelland.

== Track listing ==
No.	Title	Length
1.	"L'Introduction"	0:24
2.	"La Maladie"	1:31
3.	"Le Robot Sexy"	2:43
4.	"Le Métronome"	2:43
5.	"L'Amour Sous L'Eau"	0:36
6.	"Le Bataillon"	1:55
7.	"Le Jus De Citron"	2:43
8.	"Les Dents"	2:42
9.	"La Valérie"	5:01
10.	"La Conclusion"	9:38

== Music videos ==
Song	Director	Link
"Le Métronome"	Louis-Philippe Eno	Vimeo
"Le Jus De Citron"	Joël Vaudreuil	Vimeo
