= Golden Baby =

Single by Cœur de pirate

from the album Blonde
- Released: February 24, 2012
- Genre: Indie pop
- Length: 3:07
- Label: Grosse Boîte
- Songwriter(s): Béatrice Martin
- Producer(s): Howard Bilerman, Cœur de pirate

Cœur de pirate singles chronology
"Adieu" (2011)	"Golden Baby" (2012)

"Golden Baby" is a song by Canadian singer Cœur de pirate, from her second studio album Blonde (2011). It was released as a single in France on February 24, 2012.

== Track listing ==
Digital download

1. "Golden Baby" – 3:07

== Personnel ==
Credits adapted from Blonde album liner notes.

- Howard Bilerman – producer, recording
- Pierrick Devin – mixing
- François Gueurce – recording
- Béatrice Martin – vocals, producer
- Marc Thériault – mastering

== Charts ==
Chart (2012)	Peak position
Belgian Singles Chart (Wallonia)	3
French Singles Chart	94
