= Jimmy Hunt (musician) =

Canadian singer-songwriter from Quebec (born 1977)

- Born: c. 1977
- Origin: Saint-Nicolas, Quebec, Canada
- Genres: pop, rock
- Occupation: singer-songwriter
- Instrument: Vocals
- Years active: 2000s-present

Jimmy Hunt is a Canadian singer-songwriter from Quebec.

Originally from Saint Nicolas, a suburb of Lévis, Quebec, Hunt began performing on the local music scene in Montreal in 2000. With the band Chocolat, he released the album Piano élégant in 2008 on Grosse Boîte. In the same year, he appeared on Cœur de pirate's debut album Cœur de pirate as a duet vocalist on her song "Pour un infidèle".

He subsequently released a self-titled album as a solo artist in 2010. He was nominated for two Félix Awards in 2011, in the categories of Contemporary Folk Album of the Year and New Artist of the Year. He also won three awards at the same year's Gala alternatif de la musique indépendante du Québec, winning for Songwriter of the Year, Video of the Year and Singer-Songwriter Album of the Year, and was named one of that year's Révélations Radio-Canada.

He followed up with Maladie d’amour in 2013. The album was a longlisted nominee for the 2014 Polaris Music Prize, and won the Juno Award for Francophone Album of the Year at the Juno Awards of 2015.

He has also been a two-time nominee for the SOCAN Songwriting Prize, for his songs "Ça va de soi" in 2011, and "Nos corps" (with Christophe Lamarche-Ledoux and Emmanuel Éthier) in 2014.
