= Total Magique =

Studio album by We Are Wolves
- Released: September 4, 2007
- Genre: Indie rock
- Length: 42:48
- Label: Dare to Care Records

We Are Wolves chronology
Non-Stop je te plie en deux (2005)	Total Magique (2007)	Invisible Violence (2009)

Professional ratings
Review scores
Source	Rating
AllMusic	4/5 stars
NME	8/10
Pitchfork	7.3/10
Rock Sound	7/10 stars

Total Magique is the second album of Montreal group We Are Wolves. It was released in 2007. "Fight and Kiss" is featured on the video game Need for Speed: Pro Street, while "Psychic Kids" is featured on the video game Midnight Club: Los Angeles.

== Track listing ==
1. "Fight and Kiss" – 3:04
2. "Magique" – 2:25
3. "Some Words" – 2:45
4. "Coconut Night" – 3:51
5. "I Wrote Your Name On My Kite" – 3:12
6. "Vietnam" – 3:20
7. "Walk Away Walk" – 3:24
8. "So Nice, So Cold" – 2:48
9. "Psychic Kids" – 4:17
10. "Teenage Bats & Anthropology" – 3:55
11. "Vamos A La Playa" – 4:16
12. "The Piper" – 1:02
13. "Total Solide" – 4:40
