= Perséides (album) =

Studio album by Cœur de pirate
- Released: April 30, 2021
- Genre: Indie pop
- Length: 25:22
- Label: Bravo Musique

Cœur de pirate chronology
En cas de tempête, ce jardin sera fermé (2018)	Perséides (2021)	Impossible à aimer (2021)

Perséides ("Perseids") is the fifth studio album by Canadian singer-songwriter Béatrice Martin, under her stage name of Cœur de pirate, released April 30, 2021. The album is composed of ten solo piano songs, and was inspired by her recovery from vocal cord surgery. Each track is named for a city in Quebec that influenced Martin's childhood.

The album was a Juno Award nominee for Instrumental Album of the Year at the Juno Awards of 2022.

== Track listing ==
All tracks are written by Béatrice Martin

Perséides
No.	Title	Length
1.	"Sacré-Cœur"	2:22
2.	"Kamouraska"	2:02
3.	"Arvida"	1:59
4.	"Isle-aux-Coudres"	2:53
5.	"Frelighsburg"	1:59
6.	"Les Éboulements"	3:09
7.	"Lost River"	2:55
8.	"Saint-Irénée"	2:04
9.	"Rivière-Éternité"	3:09
10.	"Notre-Dame-du-Portage"	2:50
Total length:		25:22
