= Tricot Machine =

Canadian indie pop band

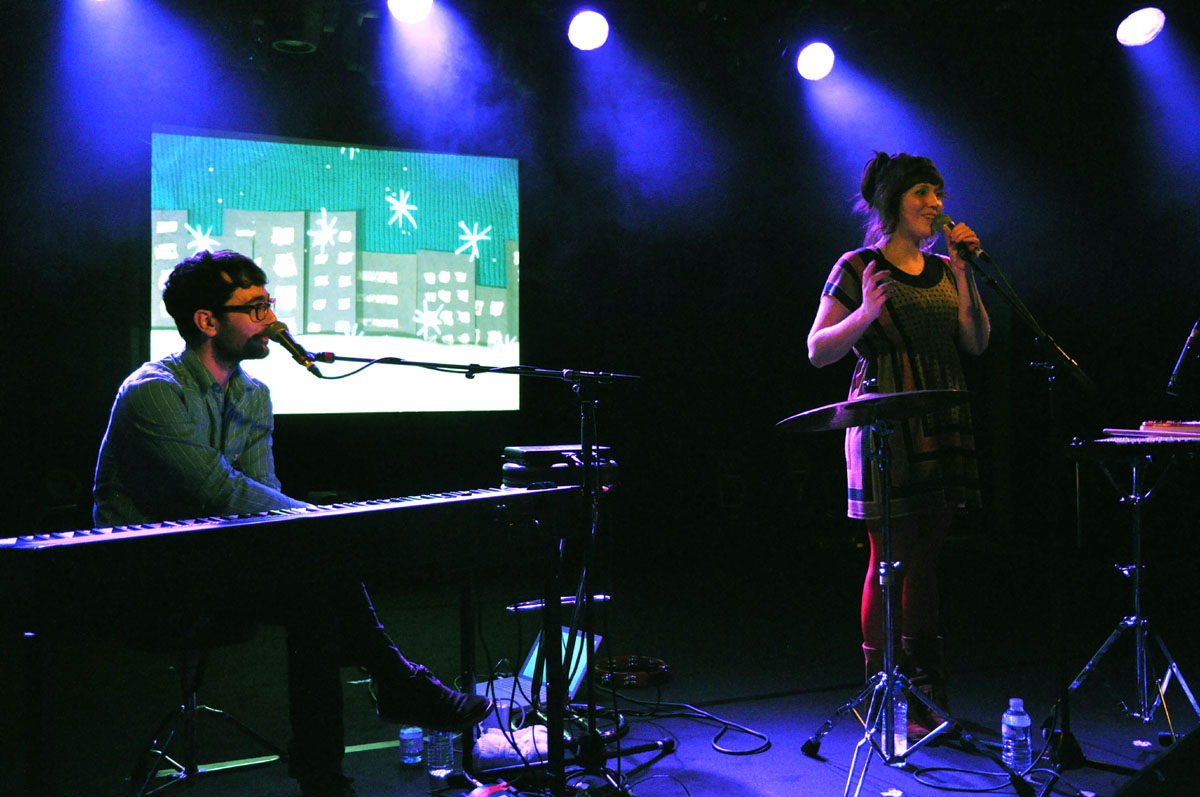
- Tricot Machine in 2009

Background information
- Origin: Trois-Rivières, Quebec, Canada
- Genres: Indie pop
- Years active: 2005–2012
- Label: Grosse Boîte
- Past members: Catherine Leduc; Matthieu Beaumont
- Website: tricotmachine.ca

Tricot Machine was a Canadian indie pop band, active from 2005 to 2012. Originally from Trois-Rivières, Quebec, the band's core members were Catherine Leduc and Matthieu Beaumont.

== History ==
Leduc and Beaumont formed Tricot Machine in 2005. They released their self-titled debut album in 2007 on Grosse Boîte. The album was named Chanson Album of the Year at the Quebec Independent Music Awards. They won a Félix Award that year for Révélation de l'année (New Artist of the Year), and Leduc won the Echo Songwriting Prize (French division) for their single "L'Ours".

In 2008, the duo released Tricot Machine chante et raconte 25 décembre, a Christmas-themed package comprising an EP of Christmas music and an illustrated children's book featuring an original Christmas story. They followed up with their second full-length album, La prochaine étape, in 2010.

Leduc announced in early 2013 that she was working on her debut solo album. The album, Rookie, was released in 2014, and she followed up in 2017 with the album Un bras de distance avec le soleil. Although both were billed as solo albums rather than Tricot Machine albums, Beaumont remained involved in the production, songwriting and instrumentation on both releases.

== Discography ==
- Tricot machine (2007)
- Tricot machine chante et raconte 25 décembre (2008)
- La prochaine étape (2010)
