= Non-Stop je te plie en deux =

Studio album by We Are Wolves
- Released: October 20, 2005
- Genre: Indie rock
- Length: 36:42
- Label: Fat Possum Records

We Are Wolves chronology
Non-Stop je te plie en deux (2005)	Total Magique (2007)

Professional ratings
Review scores
Source	Rating
Allmusic	link
Pitchfork Media	7.4/10 link

Non-Stop je te plie en deux is the first album of Montreal group We Are Wolves. It was released in 2005.

== Track listing ==
1. "Little Birds" - 3:14
2. "L.L. Romeo" - 4:03
3. "La Nature" - 5:43
4. "Snare Me" - 3:24
5. "Namaï - Taïla - Cambodge (Go - Tabla - Go)" - 5:37
6. "Non Stop" - 3:02
7. "Moi, Rythme Magique" - 0:23
8. "Vosotros, Monstruos" - 2:52
9. "T.R.O.U.B.L.E." - 3:57
10. "We Are All Winners" - 2:57
11. "Glazé, Blazé (Glaze The Blazed)" - 1:26
