= Comme des enfants =

Single by Cœur de pirate

from the album Cœur de pirate
- Released: September 28, 2009
- Length: 2:49
- Songwriter(s): Béatrice Martin
- Producer(s): Béatrice Martin, David Brunet

Cœur de pirate singles chronology
"Comme des enfants" (2009)	"Pour un infidèle" (2010)

"Comme des enfants" is a song by Canadian singer Cœur de pirate from her first studio album Cœur de pirate. It was released as a single on 28 September 2009. In 2014, an instrumental version of the song was used in an advertisement for Disneyland Paris. The song is featured in the 2024 film My Old Ass.

== Charts ==
Chart (2009)	Peak position
Belgium (Ultratop 50 Wallonia)	2
France (SNEP)	4
Switzerland (Schweizer Hitparade)	62
