= Chorale Saint-Jean =

Canadian choir

The Chorale Saint-Jean is a choir based in Edmonton, Alberta. Established in 1937, it is the largest and most active Francophone choir in Western Canada. It is based at the Campus Saint-Jean of the University of Alberta.

== History and directorship ==
The Chorale Saint-Jean was founded in 1937 under Père Lucien Pépin and became affiliated with the University of Alberta in the early 1960s. It became defunct in 1983, but was reborn in 1994 under the direction of Laurier Fagnan, a Franco-Albertan conductor and vocal coach, who opened the choir not just to students but to the broader Franco-Albertan community. In 2016, the creation of an associated children's choir, Les Petits chanteurs de Saint-Jean ("The Little Singers of Saint-Jean"), was announced. In 2023, the choir reached an agreement with the Campus Saint-Jean in which the campus would provide ongoing funding and space for the choir, while the choir would serve as ambassadors for the campus.

From 2020 to 2022, director Laurier Fagnan served as president of the arts organization Choral Canada, which represents choirs across Canada. He has contributed to interdisciplinary research projects on whether choral singing influences COVID-19 transmission and how vocal ability is influenced by wildfire smoke. Randy Boissonnault is among the choir's notable past members.

== Performances ==
The choir regularly puts on concerts in Edmonton during the Christmas season and in April, often with instrumental collaborators. In 2020, at the height of the COVID-19 pandemic, they organized a virtual Christmas concert in which the voices of more than 40 choir members were edited together to sing a piece by Franco-Albertan composer France Levasseur-Ouimet, a frequent collaborator of the ensemble.

The choir has toured other parts of Canada several times, including a one-month tour in Quebec in 1949 and a tour of Acadia in summer 2024. In 2008, the choir was accompanied by the Edmonton Symphony Orchestra in a concert at the Winspear Centre celebrating the 400th anniversary of Quebec City. This concert was followed shortly by a trip to Quebec City to take part in the celebrations. There, they sang several pieces by France Levasseur-Ouimet and joined many other choirs in an assembly of 1400 singers that sang at the Colisée de Québec. This trip was the subject of a short documentary by Franco-Albertan filmmaker Marie-France Guerrette called Le chœur d'une culture (Together in Harmony—literally "The Choir/Heart of a Culture," punning on the homophony of French chœur and cœur), which was commissioned by the National Film Board of Canada. In 2017, the choir took part in celebrations for the 150th anniversary of Canada in Ottawa.
