= Émile Bilodeau =

Canadian singer-songwriter (born 1996)

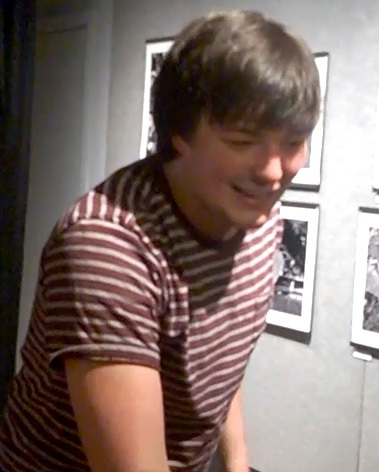
- Bilodeau in 2017

Background information
- Born: 1996 (age 29–30); Longueuil, Quebec
- Genres: Folk, blues, rock
- Occupation: Singer-songwriter
- Labels: Grosse Boîte; Dare to Care Records
- Website: Official website (English)

Émile Bilodeau (born June 28, 1996, in Longueuil, Quebec) is a Canadian singer-songwriter.

== Career ==
Born in Longueuil, Émile Bilodeau started playing drums at the age of fifteen, then he started playing guitar. He composed his first songs at the age of sixteen and produced his first CD as part of a creative project in high school.

In August 2013, Bilodeau participated in his first music festival. the Festival de la chanson de St-Ambroise, and went to the finals both that year and the next. In April 2014, he won prizes at the Cégeps en spectacle (CEGEPs on display) held by SOCAN for his combination of humor and music. He also participated in 2015 at the Festival en chanson de Petite-Vallée, from which he emerged with two awards. At the age of seventeen, he met Philippe Brach at the Festival de la Chanson de Tadoussac and opened for him three times in 2016.

Bilodeau was noticed by the founder of Dare to Care Records, Éli Bisonnette, when he competed at Francouvertes 2015 and finished in third place. He released his debut album Rites de passage in fall 2016, which was directed and arranged by singer-songwriter Philippe B. The album was a surprise success, which Bilodeau attributed to its use of Quebec French and relatable lyrical content for many Quebecers. Three years after its release, the album was certified gold by Music Canada. He also collaborated on Desjardins, a tribute album based on the works of Richard Desjardins.

In May 2017, Bilodeau became the musical revelation in song of Radio-Canada. In November of the same year, he won the Félix for Revelation of the Year at ADISQ.

In October 2019 he released his second full album titled Grandeur Mature

== Discography ==
- Rites de passage (Rites of passage, 2016)
- Hockey (single), 2017
- Rites de passage – version commentée (Rites of passage – commented version, 2017)
- Candy (with Caroline Savoie, 2019)
- Grandeur Mature (2019)
- Petite Nature (2021)
- Au bar des espoirs (2023)

== Awards ==
- ADISQ Gala 2017 – won best new musician of the year and nominated for best folk album for Rites de passage
- CBC musical revelation in song, 2017–2018

== See also ==
- Dare to Care Records
