= Impossible à aimer =

Studio album by Cœur de pirate
- Released: October 15, 2021
- Genre: Pop
- Length: 33:52
- Label: Bravo Musique
- Producers: Renaud Bastien, Béatrice Martin

Cœur de pirate chronology
Perséides (2021)	Impossible à aimer (2021)	Cavale (2025)

Impossible à aimer is the sixth studio album by Cœur de pirate, released in 2021. The album was the winner of the Juno Award for Francophone Album of the Year at the Juno Awards of 2022.

== Track listing ==
No.	Title	Length
1.	"Une chanson brisée"	3:11
2.	"On s'aimera toujours"	3:28
3.	"Une complainte dans le vent"	3:01
4.	"Le Pacifique"	3:37
5.	"Tu ne seras jamais là (avec Alexandra Stréliski)"	3:07
6.	"Dans l'obscurité"	4:08
7.	"Tu peux crever là-bas"	3:23
8.	"Crépuscule"	3:45
9.	"Le Monopole de la douleur"	3:59
10.	"Hélas"	2:09
Total length:		33:52
