= Roses (Cœur de pirate album) =

Studio album by Cœur de pirate
- Released: August 28, 2015
- Genre: pop; electropop
- Length: 40:14
- Label: Dare to Care Records, Interscope Records, Cherrytree Records
- Producer: Rob Ellis, Björn Yttling, Ash Workman

Cœur de pirate chronology
Trauma (2014)	Roses (2015)	En cas de tempête, ce jardin sera fermé (2018)

Singles from Roses
- 1. "Oublie-moi / Carry On" Released: April 4, 2015; 2. "Oceans Brawl" Released: July 31, 2015; 3. "Crier tout bas" Released: August 17, 2015

Professional ratings
Review scores
Source	Rating
Exclaim!	9/10
Now	3/5 stars

Roses is the third studio album by Canadian singer-songwriter Béatrice Martin, released under her stage name Cœur de pirate, on August 28, 2015.

== Track listing ==
All tracks are written by Béatrice Martin, except "I Don't Want to Break Your Heart" (Lyrics by Béatrice Martin and Allan Kingdom)

Roses – International standard edition
No.	Title	Length
1.	"Carry On"	3:35
2.	"Crier tout bas"	4:20
3.	"I Don't Want to Break Your Heart" (featuring Allan Kingdom)	4:05
4.	"Drapeau blanc"	3:24
5.	"Undone"	3:12
6.	"Oceans Brawl"	5:09
7.	"Our Love"	2:44
8.	"Cast Away"	3:15
9.	"Tu oublieras mon nom"	3:12
10.	"The Way Back Home"	3:42
11.	"Oublie-moi"	3:35
Total length:		40:14

Roses – International deluxe edition (bonus tracks)
No.	Title	Length
12.	"Can't Get Your Love"	3:28
13.	"The Climb"	3:17
14.	"Oceans Brawl (Ash Workman Version)"	2:47
Total length:		49:46

Roses – French, Belgian and Swiss standard edition
No.	Title	Length
1.	"Oceans Brawl"	5:09
2.	"Oublie-moi"	3:35
3.	"Crier tout bas"	4:20
4.	"I Don't Want to Break Your Heart" (featuring Allan Kingdom)	4:05
5.	"Drapeau blanc"	3:24
6.	"Undone"	3:12
7.	"Tu oublieras mon nom"	3:12
8.	"Cast Away"	3:17
9.	"The Way Back Home"	3:42
10.	"Our Love"	2:44
Total length:		36:39

Roses – French, Belgian and Swiss deluxe edition (bonus tracks)
No.	Title	Length
11.	"The Climb"	3:17
12.	"Can't Get Your Love"	3:30
13.	"Carry On"	3:36
14.	"Oceans Brawl (Ash Workman Version)"	2:46
15.	"Oublie-moi (Felix Cartal Remix)"	4:05
Total length:		53:51

== Charts ==
=== Weekly charts ===
Chart (2015)	Peak position
Belgian Albums (Ultratop Flanders)	89
Belgian Albums (Ultratop Wallonia)	5
Canadian Albums (Billboard)	2
French Albums (SNEP)	5
Swiss Albums (Schweizer Hitparade)	16

=== Year-end charts ===
Chart (2015)	Position
Belgian Albums (Ultratop Wallonia)	46
French Albums (SNEP)	76

== Certifications ==
Region	Certification	Certified units/sales
Canada (Music Canada)	Platinum	80,000^{‡}
France (SNEP)	Gold	50,000^{*}
^{*} Sales figures based on certification alone.^{‡} Sales+streaming figures based on certification alone.
