= Bonjour Brumaire =

Canadian indie pop band (2007–2010)

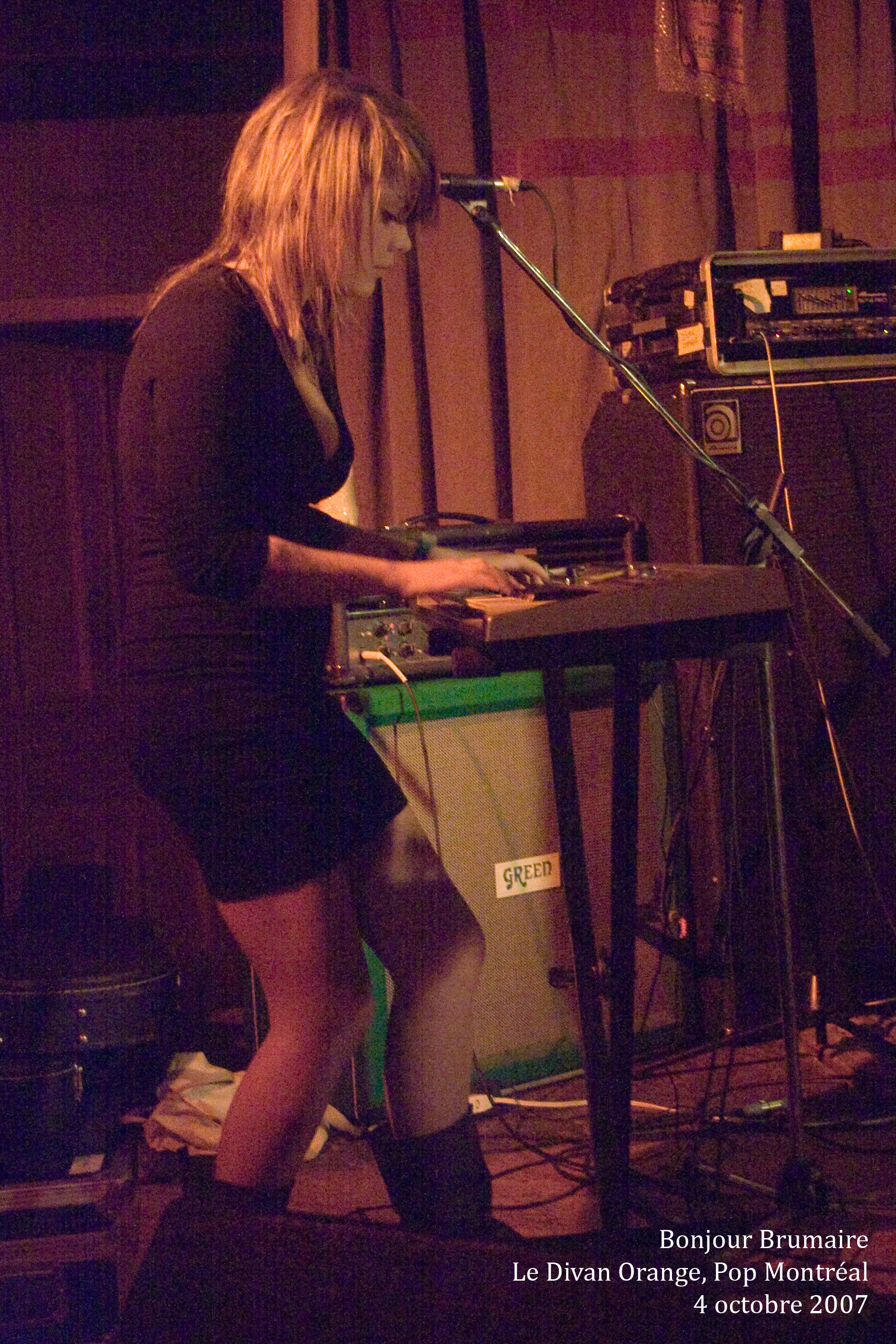

Background information
- Origin: Montreal, Quebec, Canada
- Genres: Indie pop, francophone
- Years active: 2007–2010
- Label: Indica
- Past members: Youri Zaragoza; Nathan Howard; Francois Lessard; Karine Novelle; Béatrice Martin; Patrick Brownson; Mathieu Dumontier; Jordan Larocque

Bonjour Brumaire was a francophone indie pop band based in Montreal, Quebec, Canada. Its members were Youri Zaragoza (vocals, guitar), Nathan Howard (guitar, vocals), Francois Lessard (drums), Karine Novelle (keyboards, vocals), Béatrice Martin (keyboards, vocals), Patrick Brownson (keyboards, vocals), Mathieu Dumontier (bass guitar, vocals), and Jordan Larocque (bass guitar, vocals).

Formed in January 2007, the band recorded its first demo with producer Ryan Battistuzzi (Malajube and Les Breastfeeders) only 3 months after the members first met. They played their first show in June and, in November, went into the studio for five months to record their album, De La Nature Des Foules. It was released on April 1, 2008, on Indica Records.

The song Brooklyn premiered on the Anti-Hit List Podcast on April 19, 2008.

After playing most summer festivals around Quebec in 2008 (Woodstock en Beauce, Osheaga Festival, Francofolies, and Festival d'Été de Québec), and the band won the "Breakthrough Artist" and "Indie Pop Album of the Year" awards at the 2008 Gala de l'Alternative Musicale Indépendante du Québec (Quebec Indie Music Awards).

The band posted photos of a 2009 European tour on its Facebook page, and commented that it would be producing another album, but appears to have broken up after that tour. As of 2021, the band's website was defunct; its last Facebook post was in 2010.

== Discography ==
- De La Nature Des Foules (2008)

=== Singles ===
- "Brooklyn"' (2008)
- '"Prunelle" (2008)
- "L'insouciance ne s'improvise pas" (2008)

== Awards and nominations ==
- Nominee for FAVOURITE FRANCOPHONE ARTIST/GROUP at 9th Independent Music Awards (The Indies 2009)
- Nominee for BEST REASON TO LEARN FRENCH for song "Le Candidat" at CBC Radio 3 Bucky Awards 2008
- Nominee for SOCAN's ECHO PRIZE 2008 for song "Argelès"
- Award-winner for BREAKTHROUGH ARTIST OF THE YEAR at GAMIQ 2008 (Quebec Indie Music Awards)
- Award-winner for INDIE POP ALBUM OF THE YEAR at GAMIQ 2008 (Quebec Indie Music Awards)
- Award-winner for SODRAC prize for BEST MUSIC for song "Argelès" at Francouvertes 2008 contest
- Nominee at 2008 MIMI Awards (Montreal International Music Initiative)
- Award-winner for Telus DISCOVERY OF THE YEAR at GAMIQ 2007 (Quebec Indie Music Awards)

== See also ==
- Music of Canada
- Canadian rock
- List of bands from Canada
- List of Canadian musicians
- Category:Canadian musical groups
