= En cas de tempête, ce jardin sera fermé =

Studio album by Cœur de pirate
- Released: June 1, 2018
- Genre: pop; electropop
- Label: Dare to Care Records
- Producer: Tristan Salvati

Cœur de pirate chronology
Roses (2015)	En cas de tempête, ce jardin sera fermé (2018)	Perséides (2021)

En cas de tempête, ce jardin sera fermé ("In case of storm, this garden will be closed") is the fourth studio album by Canadian singer-songwriter Béatrice Martin under her stage name Cœur de pirate, released June 1, 2018 on Dare to Care Records. Described as her most personal album, the album's themes describe and confront the process of healing from anxiety and trauma.

The album was preceded by the preview single "Prémonition" in January 2018. The single "Dans la nuit", a duet with rapper Loud, was released in May as the album's first official single.

At the Juno Awards of 2019, the album was shortlisted for the Juno Award for Francophone Album of the Year.

== Chart position ==
The album peaked at #4 on the Canadian Albums Chart.

== Track listing ==
All tracks are written by Béatrice Martin

En cas de tempête, ce jardin sera fermé
No.	Title	Length
1.	"Somnambule"	3:02
2.	"Prémonition"	2:58
3.	"Je veux rentrer"	3:44
4.	"Dans les bras de l'autre"	2:59
5.	"Combustible"	3:31
6.	"Dans la nuit (feat. Loud)"	2:30
7.	"Amour d'un soir"	3:29
8.	"Carte blanche"	3:43
9.	"Malade"	2:49
10.	"De honte et de pardon"	3:24
Total length:		32:08
