= Pascale Picard Band =

Canadian rock group

- The Pascale Picard Band in 2008

Background information
- Origin: Quebec City, Quebec, Canada
- Genres: Rock
- Years active: 2007–present
- Label: Universal
- Members: Pascale Picard; Philippe Morissette; Marc Chartrain; Mathieu Cantin
- Past members: Serge Poulin; Stéphane Rancourt
- Website: pascalepicard.com

The Pascale Picard Band is a Canadian rock group from Quebec City, formed by Pascale Picard (vocal and guitar), Philippe Morissette (bass), Marc Chartrain (drums) and Mathieu Cantin (guitar).

== History ==
The band first made a small appearance during a TV show on MusiquePlus in Montreal. The station was then flooded with messages to praise the band, forcing them to be reinvited.

Me, Myself & Us, the band's first album, was released in April 2007. Seven months later the album was platinum in Canada with more than 100,000 sold copies. The album's first single, "Gate 22", stayed in the Top 50 Anglophone chart in Quebec for 12 weeks and is in rotation on the CBC.CA Canadian singer/songwriters radio stream.

Pascale Picard, the songwriter, is at the center of the band. She was nominated for the 2008 Juno Awards in the category Artist of the year.

In January 2008 the band performed at the Midem, in Cannes, in the hope of opening new horizons in Europe. The single "Gate 22" was released in France in March 2008 and the whole album followed in June.

On August 20, 2008, Pascale and her band, incidentally from Quebec, were asked by Paul McCartney's team to open for the latter's historic show on the Plains of Abraham as part of Quebec's 400th anniversary.

During their 2008 Canadian tour they were supported by The Wooden Sky on the Eastern leg of the tour.

The band's second album A Letter to No One debuted at #4 on the Canadian Albums Chart. In February 2012, they released a soundtrack album for the third season of the television drama series Trauma, which debuted at #18 in Canada.

== Discography ==
Me, Myself & Us

Studio album by Pascale Picard Band
- Released: 2007
- Genres: Rock, Folk
- Label: Universal Music Group

Singles from Me, Myself & Us
- 1. "Smilin'!!" Released: 2007; 2. "Gate 22" Released: 2008

Professional ratings
Review scores
Source	Rating
Allmusic	4.5/5 stars

=== A Letter to No One (2011) ===
#	Title	Length
1.	"Our Christmas Song"	04:02
2.	"What We've Got (Jodie)"	02:59
3.	"The Gap"	04:16
4.	"If I Let You"	04:24
5.	"Shooting Star"	02:34
6.	"Hide And Seek "	03:15
7.	"Nobody's Here to Break Your Heart"	04:34
8.	"Raw"	03:06
9.	"Hell Is Other People"	02:46
10.	"Feeling Better"	03:26
11.	"The Right Rhyme"	03:02
12.	"Five Minutes"	04:43
13.	"Letter to No One"	02:59
14.	"And If I Miss My Shot"	04:33

=== Me, Myself & Us (2007) ===
#	Title	Length
1.	"Thinking of It"	03:36
2.	"Gate 22"	04:14
3.	"Smilin'!!"	04:15
4.	"Unconscious Liars"	04:33
5.	"That Is the Matter"	03:28
6.	"Annoying "	04:34
7.	"Let’s Have a Drink"	03:00
8.	"Sorry"	04:35
9.	"A While"	03:52
10.	"When at the End of the Road"	03:52
11.	"Useless"	04:31
12.	"Half Asleep"	04:49

Produced by the Brothers Grand
Recorded at Wild Sky Studio, Morin Heights

=== Charts ===
Chart	Peak position
Belgian Album Charts (Wallonia)	42
Canadian Albums Chart	9
French Albums Chart	12
Mexican Albums Chart	13
Swiss Albums Chart	95
