= Trauma (Canadian TV series) =

- Genre: Medical drama
- Starring: Isabel Richer; Gilbert Sicotte; Jean-François Pichette; James Hyndman; Christian Bégin; Pascale Montpetit; Stéphane Demers; Laurence Leboeuf; Yan England; Catherine De Léan; Maxime Le Flaguais
- Country of origin: Canada
- Original language: French
- No. of seasons: 5
- No. of episodes: 54

Production
- Producers: Fabienne Larouche; Michel Trudeau

Original release
- Network: Ici Radio-Canada Télé
- Release: January 5, 2010 – April 2, 2014

Trauma is a Canadian French language television medical drama series, which was broadcast from January 5, 2010 to April 2, 2014 on Ici Radio-Canada Télé. The series is set in the trauma unit of the fictional Hôpital Saint-Arsène in Montreal, Quebec.

== Cast ==
- Isabel Richer : Julie Lemieux
- Gilbert Sicotte : Antoine Légaré
- Jean-François Pichette : Mathieu Darveau
- James Hyndman : Pierre Meilleur
- Christian Bégin : David Roche
- Pascale Montpetit : Diane Hevey
- Stéphane Demers : Julien Léveillée
- Laurence Leboeuf : Sophie Léveillée
- Yan England : Étienne Labrie
- Catherine De Léan : Caroline Lemelin
- Maxime Le Flaguais : Éric Lanoue
- Isabelle Blais : Véronique Bilodeau
- Madeleine Péloquin : Martine Laliberté
- Cristina Rosato : Amaro Giulia
- Alice Morel-Michaud : Julie Lemieux (as child in flashbacks)

== Music ==
For each season, all soundtrack music for the series has been provided by a noted pop singer from Quebec, who has recorded cover versions of famous pop and rock songs. Music was recorded by Ariane Moffatt in the first and second seasons, Pascale Picard Band in the third, Martha Wainwright in the fourth and Cœur de pirate in the fifth season.
