= Catherine Leduc =

Canadian singer-songwriter

Catherine Leduc is a Canadian singer-songwriter from Trois-Rivières, Quebec. Formerly lead singer of the indie pop band Tricot Machine, she has released several solo albums under her own name since the end of that project, although her Tricot Machine bandmate Matthieu Beaumont remains involved in her solo career as a collaborator.

With Tricot Machine, she won the SOCAN Songwriting Prize (French category) in 2007 as the writer of the band's single "L'Ours".

Her debut solo album, Rookie, was released in 2014, and she followed up in 2017 with the album Un bras de distance avec le soleil.

After an eight-year hiatus, her third album, Les jours où il neige à tous les postes, was released in 2025. The album was longlisted for the 2026 Polaris Music Prize.

== Discography ==
- Rookie - 2014
- Un bras de distance avec le soleil - 2017
- Les jours où il neige à tous les postes - 2025
