= Trauma (Canadian TV series) soundtrack albums =

Television soundtrack

Trauma soundtrack albums are a series of television soundtrack albums for the Canadian television drama series Trauma, released in the 2010s.

The series has aired five seasons to date. For each season, a single pop singer from Quebec has recorded all music for the entire season, generally consisting of cover versions of famous pop and rock songs; fourth season performer Martha Wainwright, however, included three French language rerecordings of her own songs.

Music was recorded by Ariane Moffatt in the first and second seasons, Pascale Picard Band in the third, Martha Wainwright in the fourth and Cœur de pirate in the fifth season.

== Seasons 1 and 2 ==
Trauma: Chansons de la Série Télé, recorded by Ariane Moffatt, was released as an album in December 2010. It comprised songs recorded for both of the first two seasons.

No.	Title	Writer(s)	Length
1.	"Be My Baby"	Phil Spector, Jeff Barry, Ellie Greenwich	2:32
2.	"Far Away"	Martha Wainwright	3:22
3.	"Everybody Hurts"	Michael Stipe, Mike Mills, Peter Buck, Bill Berry	4:26
4.	"In My Secret Life"	Leonard Cohen	3:31
5.	"Bridge Over Troubled Water"	Paul Simon	4:29
6.	"I Hope I Don't Fall in Love with You"	Tom Waits	3:49
7.	"Where Is My Mind?"	Black Francis	3:08
8.	"Not Dark Yet"	Bob Dylan	5:25
9.	"The Greatest"	Chan Marshall	3:25
10.	"Hallelujah"	Leonard Cohen	5:28
11.	"Brain Damage"	Roger Waters	4:05
12.	"Please Tell My Brother"	Jeff Tweedy	2:39
Total length:			46:19

== Season 3 ==
Trauma: Chansons de la Série Télé, Saison #3, recorded by Pascale Picard Band, was released as an album in 2012.

No.	Title	Writer(s)	Length
1.	"Don't Think Twice, It's All Right"	Bob Dylan	2:49
2.	"Farewell Angelina"	Bob Dylan	3:58
3.	"Fever"	Eddie Cooley, Otis Blackwell	3:10
4.	"Hey, That's No Way to Say Goodbye"	Leonard Cohen	3:06
5.	"Guess Things Happen That Way"	Jack Clement	2:30
6.	"Hospital Vespers"	The Weakerthans	1:38
7.	"I Love How You Love Me"	Barry Mann, Larry Kolber	2:57
8.	"The Only Living Boy in New York"	Paul Simon	3:14
9.	"It's Now Or Never"	Wally Gold, Aaron Schroeder, Eduardo di Capua	3:56
10.	"As Tears Go By"	Mick Jagger, Keith Richards, Andrew Loog Oldham	3:19
11.	"Lullaby"	Tom Waits	2:08
12.	"Mr. Curiosity"	Jason Mraz	3:08

== Season 4 ==
Trauma: Chansons de la Série Télé, Saison #4, recorded by Martha Wainwright, was released as an album on February 26, 2013.

No.	Title	Writer(s)	Length
1.	"J'intériorisai" (French translation of her own previously recorded song "I Will Internalize")	Martha Wainwright	3:46
2.	"Dans le silence"	Kate McGarrigle, Anna McGarrigle, Philippe Tatartcheff	3:24
3.	"Si Dieu existe"	Claude Dubois	3:45
4.	"Ayoye"	Gerry Boulet, André Saint-Denis	4:22
5.	"Quand le jour est court" (French translation of her own previously recorded song "When the Day Is Short")	Martha Wainwright	3:18
6.	"Me glisser sous ta peau"	Vincent Leseney	4:39
7.	"T'es jamais partie"	Mara Tremblay	3:38
8.	"Tu peux partir"	Daniel Bélanger	3:15
9.	"Mon corps"	Ariane Moffatt	2:42
10.	"Cette vie" (French translation of her own previously recorded song "This Life")	Martha Wainwright	5:11
11.	"Le Monde est stone"	Michel Berger, Luc Plamondon	3:58
12.	"La nuit n'en finit plus"	Jacques Plante	3:31
Total length:			45:29

== Season 5 ==
Trauma: Chansons de la Série Télé, Saison #5, recorded by Cœur de pirate, was released as an album on January 14, 2014.

No.	Title	Writer(s)	Length
1.	"Ain't No Sunshine"	Bill Withers
2.	"Heartbeats Accelerating"	Kate McGarrigle, Anna McGarrigle
3.	"Summer Wine"	Lee Hazlewood
4.	"You Know I'm No Good"	Amy Winehouse
5.	"Music When the Lights Go Out"	Pete Doherty
6.	"Last Kiss"	Wayne Cochran
7.	"Lucille"	Roger Bowling, Hal Bynum
8.	"Slow Show"	Matt Berninger, Aaron Dessner, Bryce Dessner
9.	"Bottom of the World"	Tom Waits, Kathleen Brennan
10.	"Dead Flowers"	Mick Jagger, Keith Richards
11.	"The Great Escape"	Patrick Watson
12.	"Flume"	Justin Vernon
