= Cœur de pirate (album) =

Studio album by Cœur de pirate
- Released: September 16, 2008
- Genre: French pop
- Length: 31:06
- Label: Grosse Boîte
- Producer: David Brunet, Béatrice Martin

Cœur de pirate chronology
Cœur de pirate (2008)	Blonde (2011)

Singles from Coeur de pirate
- 1. "Comme des enfants" Released: September 28, 2008; 2. "Pour un infidèle" Released: March 8, 2010; 3. "Ensemble" Released: January 11, 2010; 4. "Francis" Released: November 15, 2010

Cœur de pirate is the debut album by Canadian singer Cœur de pirate, released September 16, 2008 on Grosse Boîte.

== "Ensemble" ==
The album attracted some media attention in the United States in February 2009 when François Vachon, a photographer from Quebec City, used her song "Ensemble" as the soundtrack to a popular YouTube video depicting his baby son playing with toys, leading to coverage on Good Morning America and a favourable review from blogger Perez Hilton.

== Chart performance ==
As of June 21, 2009, the album had spent 80 weeks on Canada's Nielsen SoundScan charts, and has charted in France, Switzerland and Belgium.

== Awards ==
The album was nominated for Francophone Album of the Year at the 2009 Juno Awards, and was a longlisted nominee for the 2009 Polaris Music Prize.

== Track listing ==
=== Quebec / Canada release (2008) ===
1. "Le long du large" (2:39)
2. "Comme des enfants" (2:51)
3. "Fondu au noir" (2:08)
4. "Corbeau" (2:04)
5. "Berceuse" (1:57)
6. "Intermission" (2:58)
7. "Printemps" (2:25)
8. "Ensemble" (3:07)
9. "La vie est ailleurs" (2:27)
10. "Pour un infidèle" (duet with Jimmy Hunt) (2:31)
11. "Francis" (2:55)
12. "C'était salement romantique" (2:52)

=== French release (2009) ===
1. "Le Long du large" (2:39)
2. "Comme des enfants" (2:51)
3. "Berceuse" (1:57)
4. "Printemps" (2:25)
5. "Francis" (2:55)
6. "Intermission" (2:58)
7. "Ensemble" (3:07)
8. "C'était salement romantique" (2:52)
9. "La vie est ailleurs" (2:27)
10. "Pour un infidèle" (with Julien Doré) (2:31)
11. "Corbeau" (2:04)
12. "Fondu au noir" (2:08)

All lyrics and music by Béatrice Martin.

== Personnel ==
Musicians

- Béatrice Martin - vocals, piano
- David Brunet - bass, electric and acoustic guitars, banjo, glockenspiel, percussion, synthesizer, accordion, piano
- Renaud Bastien - bass, acoustic guitar
- Joseph Perrault - drums
- Jean-Denis Levasseur - double bass, clarinet
- Lise Beauchamp - oboe
- Benoît Paradis - trombone
- Lysandre Champagne - trumpet
- Julie Brunet - alto
- Kristin Molnar - violin

Technicians

- Produced and arranged by David Brunet
- Executive Producer - Eli Bissonnette
- Mixing by Robert Langlois.
- Recorded by Robert Langlois, David Brunet, Marc St-Laurent and Nicolas Ouellette
- Artwork by Vanda Daftari.
- Photography by John Londono.

== Charts ==
Country	Chart	Peak position	Total weeks	Reference
France	SNEP	2	106	
Belgium (Wallonia)	Ultratop	4	95	
Switzerland	Swiss Music Charts	35	44	

=== Year-end charts ===
Chart (2012)	Position
Belgian Midprice Albums Chart (Wallonia)	11

== Certifications ==
Region	Certification	Certified units/sales
Belgium (BEA)	Platinum	20,000^{*}
Canada (Music Canada)	Platinum	80,000^{^}
France (SNEP)	Diamond	500,000^{*}
^{*} Sales figures based on certification alone.^{^} Shipments figures based on certification alone.
