= We Are Wolves =

Canadian indie rock band

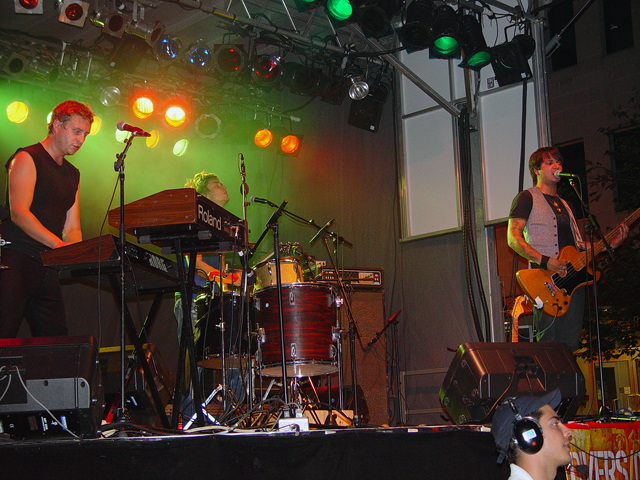
- We Are Wolves in 2006

Background information
- Origin: Montreal, Quebec, Canada
- Genres: Indie rock, dance-punk
- Years active: 2000–present
- Labels: Fat Possum Records; Dare to Care Records
- Members: Alexander Ortiz; Vincent Levesque; Pierre-Luc Bégin
- Past members: Antonin Marquis
- Website: Official website

We Are Wolves are a Canadian indie rock band, based in Montreal, consisting of vocalist and bassist Alexander Ortiz, keyboardist/backing vocalist Vincent Levesque and drummer/vocalist Pierre-Luc Bégin. The band released their debut album, Non-Stop Je Te Plie en Deux with Fat Possum Records, in 2005. They have toured extensively across Canada, the United States, and Europe to support the album and have been playlisted on CBC Radio 3. They also performed live on the first episode of that network's live concert series, CBC Radio 3 Sessions. Their second album, Total Magique, was released September 4, 2007, with a new label Dare to Care Records.

== History ==
Around 2000, Alexander Ortiz and Vincent Levesque, both from the visual art world, along with Antonin Marquis, formed a band with synthesizers, bass, vocals and drums. In their own words the band likes to qualify their sound as "a post-punk landscape with analogue trees. Like rock after the postmodern explosion". The band remained nameless until 2002; when Alexander showed up at the jam space wearing a home-made shirt with a skull spitting a synth displaying the inscription, 'We Are Wolves', they decided to name the band We Are Wolves.

In 2005, they released the album Non-Stop Je Te Plie en Deux on the American label Fat Possum. We Are Wolves promoted the album with shows in international festivals including Le Rock dans tous ses états, Les Eurokéennes, Dour Festival, SXSW, CMJ, Virgin Festival, and Osheaga. They had their first North American tour in spring 2005. They opened for …And You Will Know Us by the Trail of Dead and The (International) Noise Conspiracy. In September 2005, they performed at North East Sticks Together. A second tour came in 2006, in which they supported the Gossip in addition to some solo gigs across Canada and the United States. In the summer of 2006, they completed a five-week tour in Europe with Montreal act Duchess Says.

In May 2007, they released the single "Fight and Kiss". This EP also features "Coconut 155" and marks the second chapter in their career. We Are Wolves presented their second full-length album Total Magique on September 4, 2007, in Canada and on October 2, 2007, in the U.S. They were well received by the media and were covered in Pitchfork Media and Spin. After sold-out gigs in Quebec, receiving the M-Galaxie Prize at M for Montreal and participating in four shows for CMJ, the band toured Canada, the U.S. and Europe in 2007–2008.

In September 2008, We Are Wolves won a Gémeaux Award for the Best TV Musical Theme for Bazzo.tv theme.

The song "Psychic Kids" is featured on the video game Midnight Club: Los Angeles, and the song "Fight and Kiss" is featured on the video game Need for Speed: ProStreet.

We Are Wolves released their third full-length album, Invisible Violence, on October 6, 2009. The song "Holding Hands" is featured in the video game Gran Turismo 5.

Their fourth album, "La Mort Pop Club", was released on February 26 of 2013.

== Musical style ==
Their style is characterized by primal drum sounds, repetitive guitar riffs and bass motives, electronic instrumentation, and male vocals that represent rhythmic, rather than melodic, phrasing. Because of these elements, their sound has been described as "primitive" and this identity is represented by the band's moniker. One of their first shows was held at the art pavilion of Concordia University. Since then, they have performed in Montreal's traditional venues, loft parties, and art galleries such as Belgo, Saidye Bronfman Center and Fonderie Darling.

== Discography ==
=== Studio albums ===
- Non-Stop Je Te Plie en Deux – Fat Possum Records – 2005
- Total Magique – Dare to Care – 2007
- Invisible Violence – Dare to Care – 2009
- La Mort Pop Club – Dare to Care – 2013
- Wrong – Fantome Records – 2016
