= Cœur de pirate =

Canadian musician (born 1989)

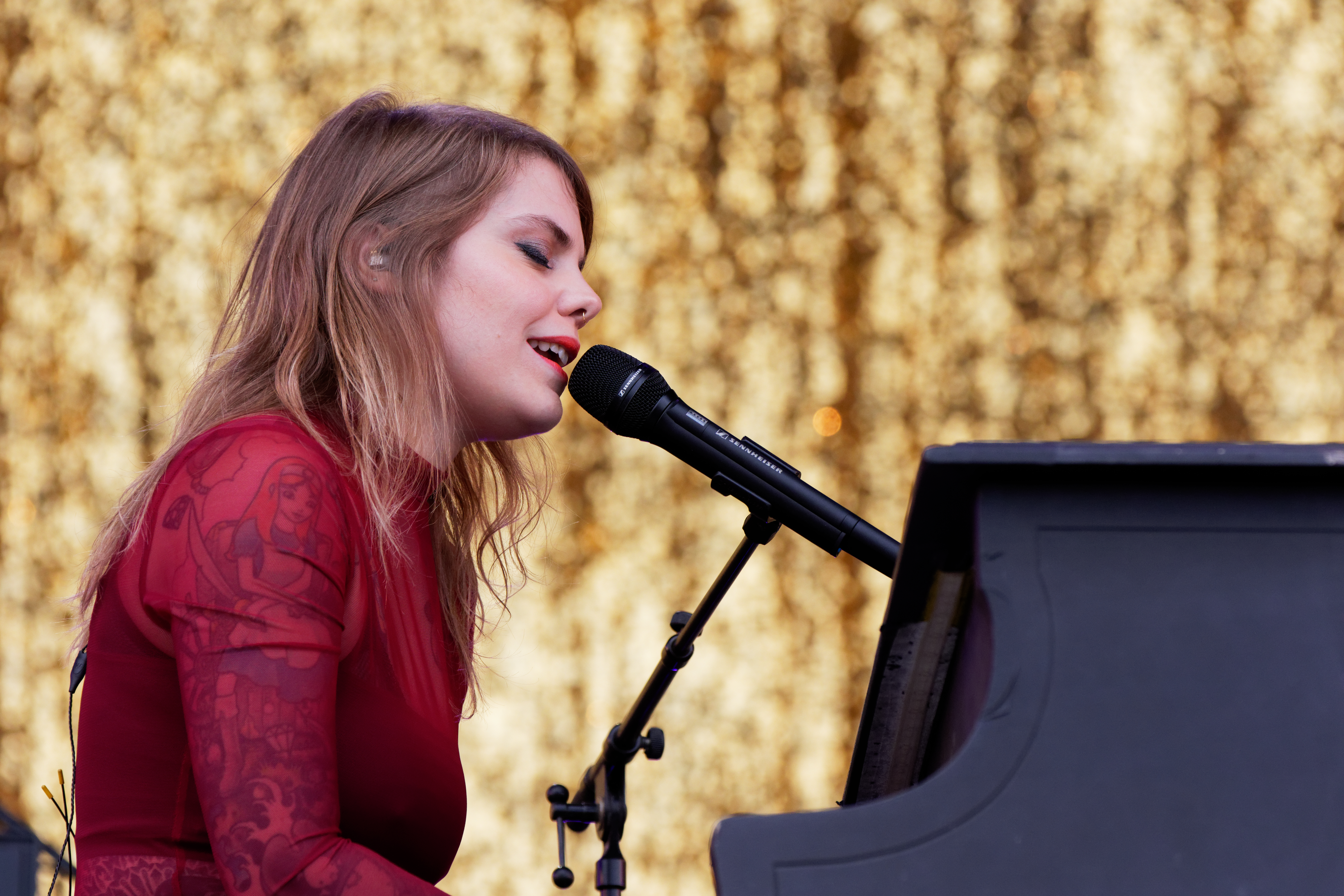
- Cœur de pirate performing in 2018

Background information
- Born: Béatrice Mireille Martin; 22 September 1989 (age 36); Outremont, Quebec, Canada
- Genres: Indie pop; folk pop
- Occupations: Musician; singer; songwriter
- Instruments: Vocals; piano; melodica; keyboards
- Years active: 2007–present
- Labels: Grosse Boîte; Barclay; Cherrytree; Interscope
- Website: coeurdepirate.com
- Spouses: Alex Peyrat (m. 2012; div. 2016): (m. 2017; div. 2018)
- Children: 2

Béatrice Mireille Martin (French pronunciation: [beatʁis maʁtɛ̃]; born 22 September 1989), better known by her stage name Cœur de pirate ([kœʁ də piʁat]; French for Pirate's heart), is a Canadian musician. A francophone from Montreal, she sings mostly in French and has been credited in Montreal Mirror with "bringing la chanson française to a whole new generation of Quebec youth."

== Career ==
=== Early beginnings ===
Born in the province of Quebec, Martin started playing the piano when she was only three years old. She entered the Conservatoire de musique du Québec à Montréal at age nine and studied there for five years.

She is the niece of actor Alexis Martin.

At age 15, she played as a keyboardist in the post-hardcore band December Strikes First, which starred her best friend, Francis, who would later become the subject of the song "Francis" on her debut album. Martin had a brief stint as keyboardist for Bonjour Brumaire from late 2007 to April 2008.

=== 2007–2009: Debut album and first success ===
In a report broadcast on French television, Martin explained that she chose the name "Cœur de pirate" to appear not "as an isolated musician, but to get a band identity from the start". She initially called herself Her Pirate Heart, but translated the name to French when she stopped writing songs in English. She released her debut album Cœur de pirate on September 16, 2008, on Grosse Boîte. Described as "rather simple" musically, it mostly featured her voice and piano playing along with some minor additional instrumentation.

In February 2009, Martin attracted wider media attention when a photographer from Quebec City, Francis Vachon, used the song "Ensemble" as the soundtrack to a viral video on YouTube entitled "Time lapse of a baby playing with his toys", leading to coverage on Good Morning America, Perez Hilton's website, The Globe and Mail, and elsewhere.

=== 2009–2011: Side projects Pearls and Armistice ===
In March 2009, Martin released a song in English, "One for Me," under the name Pearls on MySpace. In a later interview she described the project as a joke and said she did not plan to continue it, though she did not rule out the possibility of releasing music in English at a later date.

In June 2009, she made a special appearance on CBC Radio's Q radio show. She performed her single "Ensemble" and a new song, "Place de la République".

Martin performed with Jay Malinowski of Bedouin Soundclash in May 2010 on Q and talked about collaborating with him in the future. She was later featured in a Bedouin Soundclash song, "Brutal Hearts", on the album Light the Horizon. Martin, Malinowski, and several members of the American rock band The Bronx subsequently collaborated on a five-song EP under the band name Armistice, which was released on 15 February 2011.

Martin contributed a new song, "La Reine", to the 2010 edition of CBC Radio 2's Great Canadian Song Quest.

=== 2011 to present ===
On 27 March 2011, Martin revealed via her Facebook page that she was to return to the studio to commence work on her second album the following day. Her second album, Blonde, was released on 7 November 2011, in both digital and hard copy versions. "Adieu" and "Golden Baby" were released as singles from this LP.

After announcing her pregnancy in February 2012, Martin stopped touring during the second half of the year and gave birth to a daughter in September. In early 2013, Martin returned from her hiatus with a music video for "Place de la République", the first for which she acted as director, and an international tour beginning in March.

In 2013, she recorded music for the fifth season of the Canadian drama series Trauma, with a soundtrack album released on 14 January 2014.

In 2014 she composed the soundtrack for the Ubisoft Montreal's video game production Child of Light. The soundtrack includes a song, "Off to Sleep", sung in English.

In April 2015, she released the single "Carry On" in both English and French. Both versions of the song appeared on her album, titled Roses. The music video for it was filmed in the Ruins of St Raphael's Church, South Glengarry, Ontario.

On 12 August 2015, it was announced by PR Newswire that Martin has signed a record contract with American record imprints Cherrytree and Interscope Records. Upon signing, she made a statement on Facebook: "It feels wonderful to have Cherrytree Records/Interscope Records join the team," "When I first started listening to music seriously, my musical heroes were all on Cherrytree. I'm sure I'll feel right at home. Huge thanks to Martin Kierszenbaum for believing in me. I can't wait to discover what's in store as I embark on this new adventure."

On 1 June 2018, she released the album En cas de tempête, ce jardin sera fermé, her fourth album which also marks the tenth anniversary of her career. Described as her most personal album, the album's themes describe and confront the process of healing from anxiety and trauma. At the Juno Awards of 2019, the album was shortlisted for the Juno Award for Francophone Album of the Year.

In 2020, Martin was featured as a coach on the eighth season of La Voix. Her final artist, Josiane Comeau, won the season making Martin the winning coach.

On 30 April 2021, she released Perséides, her fifth album. The album is composed of ten solo piano songs, and was inspired by her recovery from vocal cord surgery. The album was a Juno Award nominee for Instrumental Album of the Year at the Juno Awards of 2022.

On 15 October 2021, she released Impossible à aimer, her sixth album. The album was the winner of the Juno Award for Francophone Album of the Year at the Juno Awards of 2022.

On 26 September 2025, she released Cavale, her seventh album.

== Collaborations ==
Martin has appeared in concert with French singer Julien Doré, performing a duet of the Rihanna hit "Umbrella". In 2009 she recorded a new version of her song "Pour un infidèle", with Doré featured as the male vocalist. They appeared together in the video for the song, styled as a 1960s-era celebrity couple.

Martin contributed vocals on "Brutal Hearts", the fourth track on the 2010 Bedouin Soundclash album Light the Horizon. Frontman Jay Malinowski and Martin subsequently collaborated under the band name Armistice, releasing a five-track self-titled album on 11 February 2011. In 2010 Martin also contributed vocals to the second track of David Usher's album The Mile End Sessions, titled "Everyday Things".

She also appeared in Peter Peter's eponymous debut album Peter Peter in the song "Tergivere".

Martin co-wrote the song "Jet Lag" with Simple Plan and a demo was recorded with her voice. The final version was recorded with Marie-Mai. The final version is shorter.

She appears on the track "Voila les anges", a cover of the song recorded originally in 1988 by Gamine on the 2012 album Couleurs sur Paris by Nouvelle Vague.

Martin contributed vocals for "Peace Sign" by Canadian synth-pop artist Lights, on the acoustic version of her 2011 album Siberia, released on 30 April 2013.

Martin also contributed vocals on "Suicide Bomber" and "All This (And More)" on the album Shape Shift with Me by punk band "Against Me!"

Martin collaborated on a 2023 remix of "Dernière danse" by the French band Kyo.

== Personal life ==
In July 2009, it was revealed that Martin had been a nude model for the alt-porn website GodsGirls under the name Bea. About 800 naked pictures were featured on the website for many months. GodsGirls removed the pictures at her record company's request when she signed her contract, but the pictures keep reappearing on the web via some blogs and forums throughout the years. Martin always acknowledged that she had done these pictures but never wanted to talk about them before July 2009.

On 29 February 2012, Martin announced on Twitter and Facebook that she was expecting a girl with her fiancé, Alex Peyrat, a tattoo artist. Martin and Peyrat were married later that year on 26 July and their daughter, Romy, was born on 4 September.

On 16 June 2016, in an op-ed for Vice magazine's Noisey, Martin came out as queer as a response to the shooting at Pulse, a gay club in Orlando. The following day, she announced that she was filing for divorce from her husband. At the time, she was known to be in a relationship with Laura Jane Grace, who fronts Against Me!, although they later broke up. Martin and Peyrat remarried in March 2017, but were divorced again in 2018.

On 17 August 2021, Martin announced her second pregnancy with partner Marc Flynn. Their son, Arlo, was born 16 January 2022.

She has publicly revealed having generalized anxiety disorder and ADHD.

== Discography ==
- Cœur de pirate (2008)
- Blonde (2011)
- Trauma (2014)
- Child of Light (2014, soundtrack for video game Child of Light)
- Roses (2015)
- En cas de tempête, ce jardin sera fermé (2018)
- Perséides (2021)
- Impossible à aimer (2021)
- Cavale (2025)

== Awards ==
Cœur de pirate received a 2009 CBC Radio 3 "Bucky" award determined by listener votes. Her song "Comme des enfants" received the 2009 "Bucky" award for "Best Reason to Learn French". In 2010, Martin won the International Achievement Award at the Francophone SOCAN Awards in Montreal. Martin won the 2014 Original Light Mix Score, New IP award by National Academy of Video Game Trade Reviewers for her work on the video game Child of Light.

=== Berlin Music Video Awards ===
The Berlin Music Video Awards is an international film festival that promotes the art of music videos.

| Year | Nominee / work | Award | Result |
|---|---|---|---|
| 2019 | Combustible | Best Song | Nominated |

=== Félix Awards ===
The Félix Awards are presented by the Association du disque, de l'industrie du spectacle québécois to artists from Quebec. Martin has won four awards from 13 nominations.

| Year | Nominee / work | Award | Result |
|---|---|---|---|
| 2009 | Cœur de pirate | Debut Artist of the Year | Won |
| 2009 | Cœur de pirate | Female Singer of the Year | Nominated |
| 2009 | Cœur de pirate | Pop Album of the Year | Nominated |
| 2010 | Cœur de pirate | Female Singer of the Year | Nominated |
| 2010 | Cœur de pirate | Concert of the Year | Nominated |
| 2010 | Cœur de pirate | Quebec Artist Most Celebrated Outside of Quebec | Nominated |
| 2010 | "Pour un infidèle" | Music Video of the Year | Nominated |
| 2011 | Cœur de pirate | Quebec Artist Most Celebrated Outside of Quebec | Nominated |
| 2011 | Cœur de pirate | Female Singer of the Year | Nominated |
| 2012 | Cœur de pirate | Female Singer of the Year | Won |
| 2012 | Cœur de pirate | Quebec Artist Most Celebrated Outside of Quebec | Won |
| 2012 | Blonde | Pop Album of the Year | Won |
| 2012 | Blonde | Best-Selling Album of the Year | Nominated |
| 2012 | "Adieu" | Pop Song of the Year | Nominated |
| 2012 | "Golden Baby" | Music Video of the Year | Nominated |
| 2012 | Cœur de pirate (with Howard Bilerman) | Album Producer of the Year | Nominated |

=== Juno Awards ===
| Year | Nominee / work | Award | Result |
|---|---|---|---|
| 2009 | Cœur de pirate | Francophone Album of the Year | Nominated |
| 2012 | Blonde | Francophone Album of the Year | Nominated |
| 2016 | Cœur de pirate | Fan Choice | Nominated |
| 2016 | "Carry On", "Crier tout bas", "Oceans Brawl" | Songwriter of the Year | Nominated |
| 2019 | En cas de tempête, ce jardin sera fermé | Francophone Album of the Year | Nominated |
| 2022 | Impossible à aimer | Francophone Album of the Year | Won |
| 2022 | Perséides | Instrumental Album of the Year | Nominated |

=== Victoires de la Musique ===
The Victoires de la Musique is an annual French award ceremony. Martin has won one award from four nominations.

| Year | Nominee / work | Award | Result |
|---|---|---|---|
| 2010 | Cœur de pirate | Group or Artist Newcomer of the Year (Public Vote) | Nominated |
| 2010 | "Comme des enfants" | Original Song of the Year | Won |
| 2011 | Cœur de pirate | Female Artist of the Year | Nominated |
| 2012 | Blonde | Album of the Year | Nominated |

=== Canadian Independent Music Awards ===
Martin has been nominated for five Canadian Independent Music Awards, of which she has won one.

| Year | Nominee / work | Award | Result |
|---|---|---|---|
| 2009 | Cœur de pirate | Favourite Francophone Artist/Group | Nominated |
| 2010 | Cœur de pirate | Favourite Solo Artist | Nominated |
| 2012 | Cœur de pirate | Francophone Artist/Group or Duo of the Year | Won |
| 2012 | Cœur de pirate | Solo Artist of the Year | Nominated |
| 2012 | "Adieu" | Video of the Year | Nominated |
