= Bravo Musique =

Canadian record label

Bravo Musique is a Canadian independent record label. Based in Montreal, the label was founded in 2000 by Éli Bissonnette and Hugo Mudie as Dare to Care Records.

Artists who have released material on Bravo Musique or Dare to Care include CLAASS, Cœur de pirate, Malajube, We Are Wolves, Les Georges Leningrad, Pawa Up First, Yesterday's Ring, Armistice, The Sainte Catherines, Ellemetue, Feu Doux, Fontarabie, Hanorah, Kandle, KROY, Lake of Stew, Les Marmottes Aplaties, Sevens Project, Socalled, Stereo Total, The Blaze Velluto Collection, and The Last Assassins, while artists on Grosse Boîte include Les Appendices, Maude Audet, Bernard Adamus, Bertrand Belin, Émile Bilodeau, Fanny Bloom, Lou-Adriane Cassidy, Canailles, Cœur de pirate, Evelyne Brochu, Fred Fortin/Gros Mené, Catherine Leduc, Jérôme 50, Tricot Machine, La Patère Rose, Le Husky, Jacquemort, Avec pas d'casque, Les Sœurs Boulay, Jimmy Hunt (/Chocolat) and Jean Leloup, Simon Laganière and Mon Doux Saigneur.

Bravo Musique has also released compilation albums under its former name of Dare to Care Records: the Montreal Spirit compilation which included the Saint-Catherines, Fifth Hour Hero, ...And the Saga Continues, Insurgent and Self-Made Man, as well as the Early Summer Campfire Songs compilation which showcased artists including Dashboard Confessional, The Kingpins and the Lawrence Arms.

In January 2021, the musician Béatrice Martin, known for her music released as Cœur de pirate, purchased the label from its founder Éli Bissonnette, and now acts as its president and artistic director. Bissonnette had stepped down amid accusations of fostering a toxic workplace, and disregarding allegations of sexual abuse directed against former label artist Bernard Adamus. In February 2021, Martin announced that the label would be rebranded as Bravo Musique to acknowledge the successes of its artists.
