= Bedouin Soundclash discography =

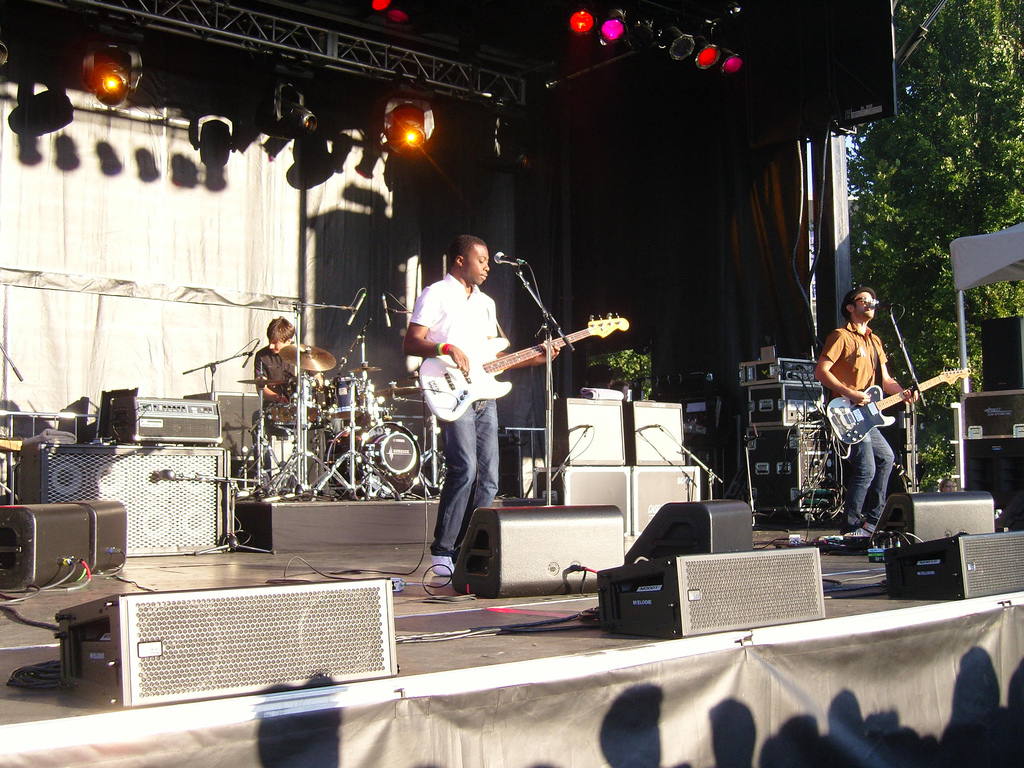
- Bedouin Soundclash performing in 2007
- Studio albums: 5
- Extended plays: 3
- Singles: 12
- Music videos: 12
- Other appearances: 3

The discography of Bedouin Soundclash, a Canadian alternative rock band, consists of five studio albums, one extended play and 12 singles. The group was founded in 2001 by Jay Malinowski, Eon Sinclair and Pat Pengelly while studying at Queen's University in Kingston, Ontario. Their debut studio album Root Fire was released independently that year. It is a hybrid of genres, combining reggae, soul and African tribal music.

Bedouin Soundclash then worked extensively with producer Daryl Jenifer of the band Bad Brains in recording their second studio album Sounding a Mosaic. Released in September 2004, it reached number nine on the United States Billboard Top Reggae Albums chart., and was certified platinum by Music Canada (MC). Three singles were released from the album: "When the Night Feels My Song", "Shelter" and "Gyasi Went Home". "When the Night Feels My Song" was the only single to chart, peaking at number 24 in the United Kingdom.

The band released their third studio album, Street Gospels, in August 2007, which featured collaborations with Money Mark and Wade MacNeil. The album peaked at number two on the Canadian Albums Chart and was certified gold by Music Canada. Five singles were released from the album, with "Walls Fall Down" charting at number six on the Billboard Canadian Hot 100.

In 2009, Pengelly left Bedouin Soundclash and was replaced by Sekou Lumumba on the band's fourth studio album Light the Horizon, released in September 2010. It reached number 14 in Canada. Three singles were released from the album: "Mountain Top", "Elongo" and "Brutal Hearts", a collaboration with Cœur de pirate.

== Albums ==
=== Studio albums ===
List of studio albums, with selected chart positions and certifications
Title	Album details	Peak chart positions					Certifications
Title	Album details	CAN	SCO	UK	UK Indie	US Reggae	Certifications
Root Fire	Released: November 16, 2001 (CAN); Label: Pirates Blend (88697661432); Formats: CD, DD	—	—	—	—	—	
Sounding a Mosaic	Released: September 7, 2004 (CAN); Labels: Stomp, SideOneDummy (STOMP043); Formats: CD, DD	26	84	84	—	9	MC: Platinum
Street Gospels	Released: August 21, 2007 (CAN); Labels: Dine Alone, SideOneDummy (DA010); Formats: CD, DD	2	—	—	15	4	MC: Gold
Light the Horizon	Released: September 28, 2010 (CAN); Label: Pirates Blend (SG28217); Formats: CD, DD, LP	14	—	—	—	—	
MASS	Released: October 4, 2019 (CAN); Label: Easy Star; Formats: CD	—	—	—	—	—	
We Will Meet in a Hurricane	Released: October 21, 2022 (CAN); Label: Dine Alone Records; Formats: Streaming, Digital Download	—	—	—	—	—	
"—" denotes items which were not released in that country or failed to chart.

=== Extended plays ===
List of extended plays
Title	Album details
Bedouin Soundclash: Warped Tour Bootleg Series	Released: December 4, 2007 (UK); Label: SideOneDummy; Format: DD
Where Have the Songs Played Gone To?	Released: June 16, 2009 (CAN); Label: Dine Alone; Format: DD
iTunes Live from Montreal	Released: December 29, 2010 (CAN); Label: Pirates Blend; Format: DD

== Singles ==
List of singles, with selected chart positions, showing year released and album name
Title	Year	Peak chart positions							Certifications	Album
Title	Year	CAN	CAN AC	CAN Pop	CAN Rock	SCO	SWI	UK	Certifications	Album
"When the Night Feels My Song"	2005	4	1	—	—	19	—	24	MC: Platinum	Sounding a Mosaic
"New Year's Day" / "Shelter"	2006	—	—	—	—	—	—	—		Sounding a Mosaic
"Gyasi Went Home"	2006	—	—	—	—	—	—	—		Sounding a Mosaic
"Walls Fall Down"	2007	6	9	23	27	—	34	—	MC: Gold	Street Gospels
"St. Andrews"	2007	—	—	—	44	—	—	—		Street Gospels
"12:59 Lullaby"	2008	—	—	—	—	—	—	—		Street Gospels
"Until We Burn in the Sun (The Kids Want a Love Song)"	2008	—	—	—	—	—	—	—		Street Gospels
"Hearts in the Night"	2009	—	—	—	—	—	—	—		Street Gospels
"Mountain Top"	2010	—	—	—	25	—	—	—		Light the Horizon
"Elongo"	2011	—	—	—	50	—	—	—		Light the Horizon
"Brutal Hearts" (featuring Cœur de pirate)	2011	—	—	—	—	—	—	—		Light the Horizon
"Clock Work"	2017	—	—	—	45	—	—	—		MASS
"Salt-Water"	2017	—	—	—	—	—	—	—		MASS
"They Gutted This City"	2018	—	—	—	—	—	—	—		MASS
"When We're Gone"	2018	—	—	—	—	—	—	—		MASS
"Born into Bad Times"	2018	—	—	—	—	—	—	—		MASS
"Drive"	2018	—	—	—	—	—	—	—		MASS
"Holy"	2018	—	—	—	—	—	—	—		MASS
"Shine On" (featuring Marcia Richards of The Skints)	2022	—	—	—	—	—	—	—		We Will Meet in a Hurricane
"Something Lost + Something Found"	2022	—	—	—	—	—	—	—		We Will Meet in a Hurricane
"—" denotes items which were not released in that country or failed to chart.

== Other appearances ==
List of non-single appearances, with other performing artists, showing year released and album name
Title	Year	Other artist(s)	Album
"Soundboy"	2006	Lordz of Brooklyn	The Brooklyn Way
"Last Standing Soldier (Bedouin Remix)" (featuring Bedouin Soundclash)	2006	Kardinal Offishall	Non-album release
"Manny the Tasmanian Devil"	2008	—N/a	Roll Play 2
"Here I Am"	2011	Saint James Music Academy	Non-album release

== Music videos ==
List of music videos, showing year released and director
Title	Year	Director(s)
"When the Night Feels My Song"	2005	Marc Ricciardelli
"Shelter"	2006	Marc Ricciardelli
"Gyasi Went Home"	2006	Marc Ricciardelli
"Walls Fall Down"	2007	Marc Ricciardelli
"St. Andrews"	2008	Marc Ricciardelli
"12:59 Lullaby"	2008	Marc Ricciardelli
"Until We Burn (The Kids Just Want a Love Song)"	2008	Michael Maxxis
"Hearts in the Night"	2009	Michael Maxxis
"Mountain Top"	2010	Michael Maxxis
"Elongo"	2011	Michael Maxxis
"Brutal Hearts" (Version one featuring Cœur de pirate)	2011	Bruce McDonald
"Brutal Hearts" (Version two featuring Cœur de pirate)	2011	Bruce McDonald
