= VCR (disambiguation) =

A VCR is a videocassette recorder.

VCR may also refer to:

- VCR (band), a rock band from Richmond, Virginia
  - VCR (EP)
- "VCR" (song), a song by The xx
- "VCR", a song by Tyler, the Creator from the album Bastard, 2009
- "VCR", a song by JID and Vince Staples from the album God Does Like Ugly, 2025
- Variable compression ratio
- Video Cassette Recording, an early videocassette recorder system by Philips
- Vincristine, a natural alkaloid
- Swagelok VCR - a type of vacuum equipment connectors
- Voltage-controlled resistor, electronic component
- Panhard VCR, a French armored personnel carrier
- Viva Cristo Rey, a Spanish phrase meaning "Long Live Christ the King," used particularly in Mexico
