= Walls Fall Down =

Single by Bedouin Soundclash

from the album Street Gospels
- Released: August 13, 2007 (United Kingdom)
- Genre: Rock, reggae
- Length: 2:31
- Label: Dine Alone Records; SideOneDummy Records
- Songwriters: Jay Malinowski; Eon Sinclair; Pat Pengelly; Margaret Joy
- Producers: Darryl Jenifer; Margaret Joy (summer 2007--album & radio version)

Bedouin Soundclash singles chronology
"Gyasi Went Home" (2006)	"Walls Fall Down" (2007)	"St. Andrews" (2007)

Bedouin Soundclash is best-known for the Top 10-charting radio single, "Walls Fall Down". The rock and reggae-influenced song was the first single from the band's third album Street Gospels (2007). The song was released to radio in summer 2007.

After the success of "Walls Fall Down", the album Street Gospels was released. It was released on Dine Alone Records on August 21, 2007. In the UK, the album was released on August 20, 2007 through SideOneDummy Records. According to HMV, the album was the #1 best seller in Canada soon after its release. On August 29, 2007, JAM! reported that the album debuted at #2 on the Canadian Albums Chart, selling over 8,000 copies in its first week. It marked Bedouin Soundclash's best chart showing to date. The week of September 8, 2007, the album reached #4 on the U.S. Billboard Top Reggae Albums chart. The album was certified Gold by the CRIA in 2008 for sales of over 50,000 copies in Canada.

Bedouin Soundclash appeared on the September/October 2007 cover of Canadian Musician magazine.

At the Juno Awards of 2008, the song "Walls Fall Down" got the band a nomination for the “Pop Album of the Year” award and the “Video of the Year” award. At the 2008 MuchMusic Video Awards, the music video was nominated for the "Best Director" award and for the "VideoFACT Best Independent Video" award.

== Chart performance ==
"Walls Fall Down" reached #1 on the MuchMoreMusic countdown, #2 on CFNY-FM "102.1 The Edge" radio's Thursday 30, and #6 on the Canadian Hot 100 chart. The song proved popular on Canadian radio, peaking at #20 on the BDS Airplay chart.

== Formats and track listings ==
UK CD single

1. "Walls Fall Down" – 2:31
2. "Gunships" – 2:50

== Charts ==
Chart (2007)	Peak position
MuchMoreMusic Countdown	1
CFNY-FM "102.1 The Edge" Thursday 30	2
Canadian Hot 100	6
