= Atticus: ...Dragging the Lake, Vol. 3 =

Compilation album by Various Artists
- Released: February 22, 2005
- Recorded: Various
- Genre: Punk rock
- Length: 78:35
- Label: SideOneDummy

Various Artists chronology
Atticus: ...Dragging the Lake, Vol. 2 (2003)	Atticus: ...Dragging the Lake, Vol. 3 (2005)	Atticus: IV (2007)

Professional ratings
Review scores
Source	Rating
Allmusic	4/5 stars

Atticus: ...Dragging the Lake, Vol. 3 was the third in the series of compilation albums created by Atticus Clothing.

== Track listing ==
No.	Title	Artist	Length
1.	"This is the Part"	Gratitude	2:52
2.	"Not Now"	Blink-182	4:02
3.	"Number Five with a Bullet"	Taking Back Sunday	3:44
4.	"1000 Paper Cranes"	Motion City Soundtrack	2:25
5.	"Grey Skies Turn Blue"	MxPx	3:15
6.	"Bike Riders"	Lucero	4:32
7.	"The New Year"	Death Cab for Cutie	3:59
8.	"Grand Theft Autumn/Where Is Your Boy" (Acoustic)	Fall Out Boy	3:09
9.	"Red Wedding"	The Bled	2:45
10.	"Dancing For Rain"	Rise Against	3:55
11.	"Part of Your Body is Made out of Rock"	Piebald	2:15
12.	"Smile, You've Won"	Lydia	3:24
13.	"No Transitory"	Alexisonfire	3:14
14.	"She Drove Me to Daytime Television"	Funeral for a Friend	3:32
15.	"Living in America" (Andy Wallace Mix)	The Sounds	3:17
16.	"Bratcore"	VCR	2:07
17.	"You'll Never Guess Who Died"	The Kinison	3:25
18.	"Bury Your Head"	Saosin	3:25
19.	"This Was Never" (Incorrectly labeled as "Cover Up")	Name Taken	3:16
20.	"In Defense of Dorchester"	Street Dogs	2:31
21.	"Cigarette"	Recover	3:15
22.	"Until Morale Improves, The Beatings Will Continue"	Murder by Death	3:46
23.	"This Time is the Last Time" (Wave Remix)	Mae	3:23
24.	"When the Night Feels My Song"	Bedouin Soundclash	3:07
