= Atticus: ...Dragging the Lake, Vol. 2 =

Atticus ...Dragging the Lake. II

Compilation album by Various Artists
- Released: March 17, 2003
- Recorded: Various Times
- Genre: Punk rock
- Label: SideOneDummy

Various Artists chronology
Atticus: ...Dragging the Lake (2002)	Atticus ...Dragging the Lake. II (2003)	Atticus: ...Dragging the Lake, Vol. 3 (2005)

Professional ratings
Review scores
Source	Rating
Allmusic	3.5/5 stars

Atticus: ...Dragging the Lake, Vol. 2 was the second in the series of compilation albums created by Atticus Clothing.

== Track listing ==
1. "I'm Not Invisible" by Rocket from the Crypt
2. "Remedy" by Hot Water Music
3. "To Awake and Avenge the Dead" by Thrice
4. "Worms of the Earth" by Finch
5. "Fields of Athenry" by Dropkick Murphys
6. "Don't Tell Me It's Over" by Blink-182
7. "Vacant Skies" by Sparta
8. "Once Again" by Slick Shoes
9. "Noble Stabbings!" by Dillinger Four
10. "All My People" by Suicide Machines
11. "E. Dagger" by Lagwagon
12. "Soleil" by Maxeen
13. "Pride War" by Further Seems Forever
14. "William Tell Override" by Jets to Brazil
15. "All Systems Go" by Box Car Racer
16. "One Seventeen" by Transplants
17. "All We Want" by H_{2}O
18. "You're So Last Summer" by Taking Back Sunday
19. "Heaven Knows" by Rise Against
20. "A Jackknife to a Swan" by The Mighty Mighty Bosstones
21. "The Greatest Fall (Of All Time)" by Matchbook Romance
22. "Misled" by Hot Rod Circuit
23. "Next to Go" by Down by Law
24. "Be There" by Over My Dead Body
25. "Some Came Running" by Bane
26. "Crawl" (Live) by Alkaline Trio
