= Jay Malinowski =

Canadian singer, songwriter, artist and writer

- Born: 1982 (age 43–44); Montreal, Quebec, Canada
- Origin: Vancouver, British Columbia, Canada
- Genres: Indie; folk; rock; reggae
- Occupation: Musician
- Instruments: Acoustic guitar; electric guitar; piano; vocals
- Years active: 2001–present
- Labels: Stomp; Dine Alone; SideOneDummy; Pirates Blend; Sony Music
- Member of: Bedouin Soundclash
- Formerly of: Armistice
- Website: www.jaymalinowski.com

Jay Malinowski (born 1982) is a Canadian singer, songwriter, visual artist and writer. He was born in Montreal, Quebec, and grew up in Vancouver, British Columbia. He is best known as the vocalist and guitarist for reggae group Bedouin Soundclash.

== Personal life ==
Born in Montreal, Quebec in 1982, Malinowski's family moved to Vancouver, British Columbia when he was nine months old. He attended St. George's School where he played his first show at the age of 16 as part of a school talent night. He received the Rigg Scholarship in his last year of high school. He attended Queen's University where he graduated with a Bachelor Of Fine Arts Degree in 2004. He met Eon Sinclair at Queen's and after discovering their mutual love of reggae music, decided to form their own band, Bedouin Soundclash, with fellow Queen's student, Patrick Pengelly. By the end of third year, they signed to Stomp Records and had toured across Canada. In 2005, Malinowski moved to Toronto to pursue music full-time. In 2009, Malinowski co-founded Pirates Blend Records. Malinowski participated in the 2010 Winter Olympic Games Torch Relay, carrying the torch through part of the downtown Vancouver course. Upon moving home to Vancouver in 2012, Malinowski started volunteering at St. James Academy on the downtown east side in Vancouver. He taught songwriting to kids in the after-school and summer programs. The students from St. James appear on Jay Malinowski & the Deadcoast's Indian Summer EP, as well as their 2014 full-length album, Martel. In 2013, he walked the Camino de Santiago, a well-known pilgrimage walk that stretches from the Pyrenees Mountains to Santiago de Compostela on the western coast of Spain.

== Career ==
=== Bedouin Soundclash ===
While attending Queen's University, Malinowski met Eon Sinclair and formed Bedouin Soundclash. In 2001, they released their first album, Root Fire, which was hailed as "one of the best debut albums" by Exclaim! In 2004, they enlisted Darryl Jenifer of Bad Brains as the producer of their album, Sounding a Mosaic. The band's break came when Kevin Lyman invited them to play Warped Tour 2005. That year, they signed to SideOneDummy Records. Mike Davies of the BBC championed the hit Sounding a Mosaic single, "When the Night Feels My Song", which rocketed to #24 on the charts and was the second most played song in Canada that summer. They toured with Ben Harper and No Doubt in 2006. The band received the JUNO Award for "New Group of the Year" at the 2006 JUNOS in Halifax, Nova Scotia. In 2007, they released the album Street Gospels. The band released the EP Where Have All the Songs Played Gone To in 2009, before the full-length album Light the Horizon in September 2011.

=== Solo work ===
On February 16, 2010, Malinowski released his first solo album, Bright Lights & Bruises. The record was said to be like a diary for him. Steve Bays and Paul Hawley of Hot Hot Heat provided backing instrumentation for the record. He toured in support of this album with Michael Rault and Kinnie Starr as opening acts.

=== Armistice ===
Malinowski recorded a five-song EP with Cœur de pirate and the Bronx at the Bronx's studio in Van Nuys, California under the band name Armistice. The EP was released February 15, 2011 and contains the single "Mission Bells".

=== Jay Malinowski & the Deadcoast ===
After moving back to Vancouver in April 2012, Malinowski started collaborating with local string trio, the End Tree. The End Tree joined Malinowski, eventually becoming known as The Deadcoast in recordings and on stage. In July, 2012, it was announced that Malinowski would perform alongside Chuck Ragan, Cory Branan, Emily Barker, and Rocky Votolato for the European leg of the 2012 Revival Tour. In November 2012, Jay Malinowski & the Deadcoast released a five-song EP, Indian Summer, to coincide with their tour in Europe as part of the Revival Tour. On February 11, 2014, they released an eighteen-song full-length album, entitled Martel. Malinowski explains that the concept behind the album was loosely based on a distant French Huguenot relative of his, Charles Martel. The album is divided into two distinctive parts, the Pacific and the Atlantic. The first single, "Patience Phipps", was based on a name that Malinowski found in his family tree.

== Writing ==
In 2014, Malinowski inked an e-book publishing deal with HarperCollins for his book Skulls & Bones: 14 Letters from a Sailor at the End of the World. An illustrated novella, the book follows the travels of the sailor "Martel" through a series of letters written to his granddaughter, whom he lost contact with long ago. Telling of their ancestral past, his life at sea, and the choices upon which their lives have been built, Martel's letters illuminate the power of stories passed down through generations—stories that changed over time, and that ruptured their family narrative, tearing them all apart. The e-book's enhanced version includes songs and videos from the accompanying Jay Malinowski & the Deadcoast album, Martel, which was released February 11, 2014, as well as original ink drawings by Malinowski. The book was released on September 1, 2015.

== Visual art ==
After graduating Queen's University, Malinowski had a solo show at Gallery Bibbiane in Toronto. He paints mainly in encaustic with mixed media. In 2006, his work was part of a group show for Pop Montreal. The Crystal Gallery in Whistler housed a show of his in April 2014 and he has recently been commissioned by the Burrard Arts Foundation to create a mural which will be mounted in the Gastown area of Vancouver, which Malinowski calls home. The mural was scheduled to be unveiled mid-September 2015. Malinowski created the album cover art for Bedouin Soundclash's first three albums.

== Discography ==
Root Fire (Bedouin Soundclash)

- Released: 2001

Sounding a Mosaic (Bedouin Soundclash)

- Released: 2004

Street Gospels (Bedouin Soundclash)

- Released: 2007

Where Have All the Songs Played Gone To (Bedouin Soundclash)

- Released: 2009

Bright Lights & Bruises

- Released: 2010

Light the Horizon (Bedouin Soundclash)

- Released: 2010

Armistice (Armistice)

- Released: 2011

Indian Summer (Jay Malinowski & the Deadcoast)

- Released: 2012

Martel (Jay Malinowski & the Deadcoast)

- Released: 2014

Mass (Bedouin Soundclash)

- Released: 2019

We Will Meet In A Hurricane (Bedouin Soundclash)

- Released: 2024
