= Armistice (band) =

Canadian indie pop band

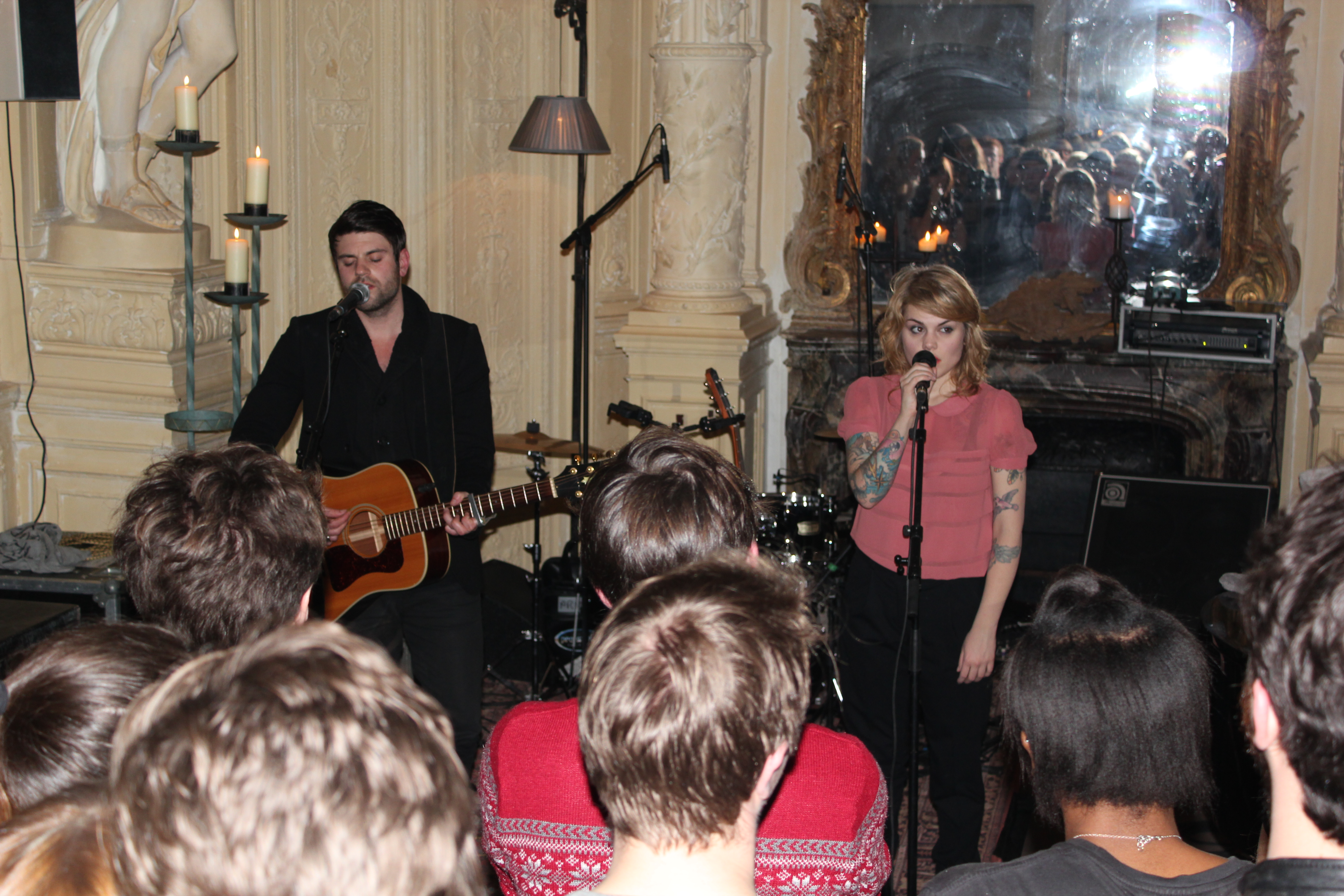
- Armistice performing in 2011

Background information
- Origin: Canada
- Genre: Indie pop
- Years active: 2010–2011
- Labels: Dare to Care, Pirates Blend
- Spinoff of: Bedouin Soundclash
- Members: Béatrice Martin (Coeur de pirate); Jay Malinowski
- Website: www.myspace.com/armisticeofficial/

Armistice was a Canadian indie pop band, consisting of Montreal singer-songwriter Béatrice Martin, better known by her stage name Coeur de pirate, and Jay Malinowski of Bedouin Soundclash.

== History ==
Martin and Malinowski met at the 2010 Winter Olympics in Vancouver. They began a relationship and started playing music and writing songs. The duo released a five-song EP, Armistice, on February 15, 2011, on Dare to Care Records. The EP's lead single, "Mission Bells", was released to radio in early January.

In addition to Martin and Malinowski, several members of the American punk rock band The Bronx participated in the recording, playing primarily in the mariachi style of their 2009 album Mariachi El Bronx. The album's tracks blended this with Malinowski's alt-rock, Martin's French indie-pop, and a little reggae.

After 2011, Armistice was no longer active due to Béatrice Martin and Jay Malinowski ending their relationship. Martin continues to perform songs which the pair wrote for the album.

== Discography ==
=== Extended plays ===
List of extended plays, with selected chart positions
Title	Album details	Peak chart positions
Title	Album details	CAN
Armistice	Released: February 15, 2011; Label: Dare to Care (DTCCD6425); Formats: CD, DD	11

=== Singles ===
List of singles, showing year released and album name
Single	Year	Album
"Mission Bells"	2011	Armistice

=== Music videos ===
List of music videos, showing year released and director
Title	Year	Director(s)
"Mission Bells"	2011	Michael Maxxis
