= Atticus: ...Dragging the Lake =

Compilation album by Various Artists
- Released: May 7, 2002
- Recorded: Various
- Genre: Punk rock
- Length: 73:40
- Label: SideOneDummy

Various Artists chronology
Atticus: ...Dragging the Lake (2002)	Atticus: ...Dragging the Lake, Vol. 2 (2003)

Professional ratings
Review scores
Source	Rating
Allmusic	2.5/5 stars

Atticus: ...Dragging the Lake was the first in the series of compilation albums created by Atticus Clothing. The bands were chosen by Mark Hoppus and Tom Delonge from Blink-182.

== Track listing ==
1. "Jaked On Green Beers" - Alkaline Trio †
2. "Post Script" - Finch
3. "Time To Break Up" - Blink-182 †
4. "Ex-Miss" - New Found Glory †
5. "Walking On Glass" - The Movielife
6. "Long Way To Fall" - Autopilot Off †
7. "Yakisoba" - Avoid One Thing
8. "Find Comfort In Yourself" - Midtown
9. "On Vacations" - Rival Schools †
10. "Tiny Voices" - Box Car Racer †
11. "Bright Lights, Big City" - Madcap †
12. "AM/PM" - American Nightmare
13. "Daddy's Little Defect" - Sugarcult
14. "Radio Cambodia" - Glassjaw †
15. "Sugar Free" - The Mighty Mighty Bosstones †
16. "Catherine Morgan" - Bad Astronaut (Feat. members of Lagwagon)
17. "Greg's Last Day" - The Starting Line
18. "I'd Do Anything" - Simple Plan (Feat. guest vocal from Mark Hoppus)
19. "The Safety Of Routine" - Name Taken †
20. "A Box Full Of Sharp Objects" - The Used †
21. "I Believe" - Agent 51
22. "Friday Nite" - Slick Shoes
23. "Destination" - Kut U Up †
24. "Praise Chorus" (Live in London) - Jimmy Eat World †

† : These tracks are marked on the original artwork as 'Unreleased'.
