= Maxeen (album) =

Studio album by Maxeen
- Released: November 18, 2003
- Recorded: June – July 2003
- Genre: Pop punk, punk rock
- Length: 39:42
- Label: SideOneDummy
- Producer: Ed Stasium

Maxeen chronology
Maxeen (2003)	Hello Echo (Tour Edition) (2006)

Maxeen is a pop punk album put out in 2003 by the band Maxeen.

== Track listing ==
1. "Please" – 3:45
2. "Delete Lola" – 3:20
3. "Love Goes A Long Way" – 2:40
4. "Strangers" – 2:42
5. "Poison June" – 3:20
6. "Lead Not Follow" – 4:40
7. "Soleil" – 3:38
8. "White Flag" – 3:42
9. "Shuffle My Feet" – 2:02
10. "Take The Weight Off" – 1:40
11. "Gettaway" – 2:14
12. "Good Enough" - 5:53
13. "I Love You"* - 2:44
14. "Soleil (Acoustic Version)* - 4:16

*Bonus Track for Japan Only
