= Pkew pkew pkew =

Canadian punk rock band

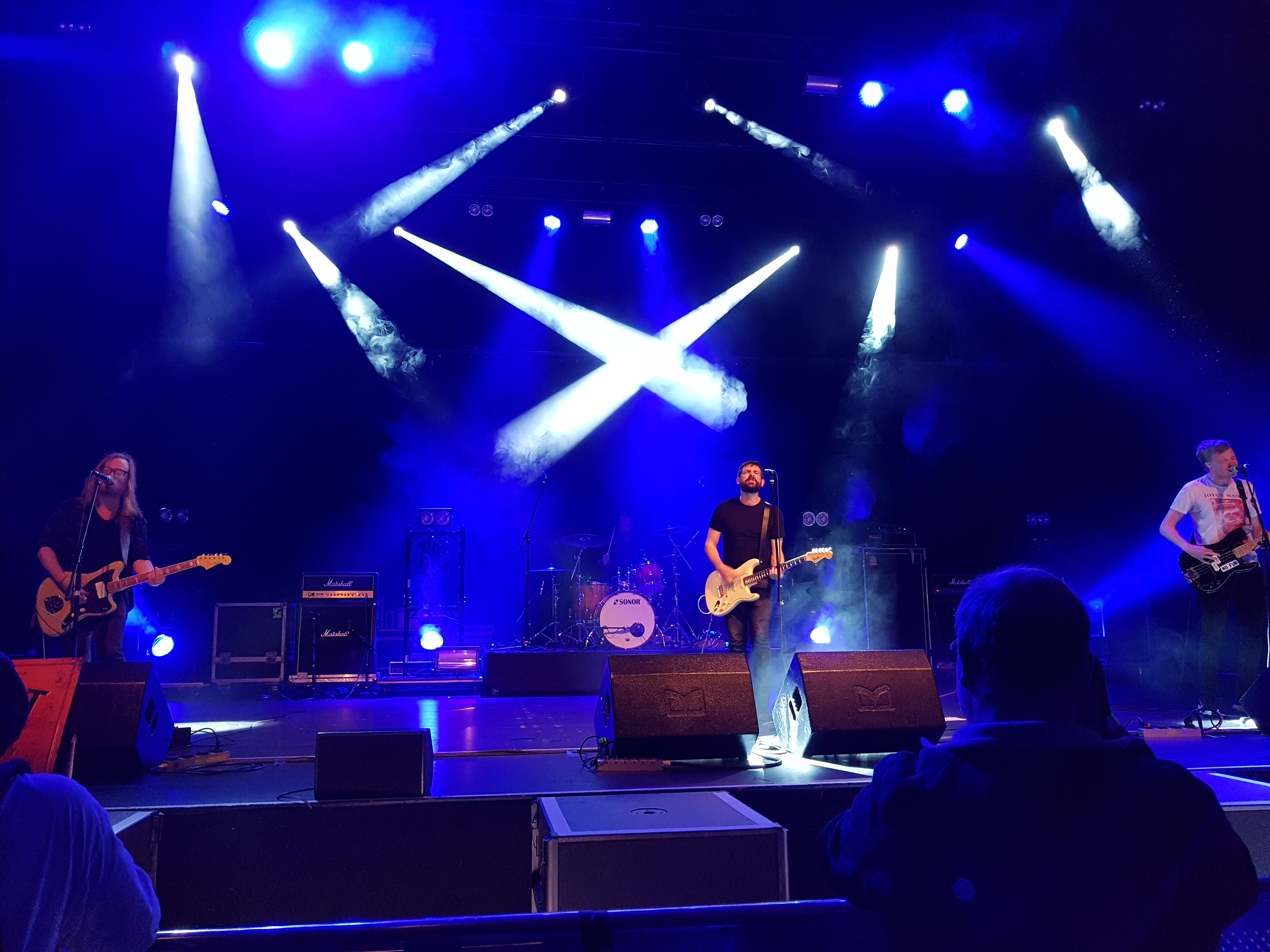

Background information
- Origin: Toronto, Ontario, Canada
- Genres: Punk rock, Pop punk
- Years active: 2010–present
- Labels: Royal Mountain, Big Scary Monsters, Dine Alone, Stomp Records

Pkew Pkew Pkew (stylized as PKEW PKEW PKEW) is a Canadian punk rock band formed in Toronto, Ontario. Pkew Pkew Pkew's self-titled debut album was released on June 10, 2016, on Royal Mountain Records. On June 21, 2017, Pkew Pkew Pkew signed with SideOneDummy Records, and re-issued their debut album. They released their second album in 2019.

== History ==
Pkew Pkew Pkew released their debut EP in 2013 under the Art Drug label.

On June 10, 2016, Pkew Pkew Pkew released their debut album through Royal Mountain Records. Later the same month, Pkew Pkew Pkew toured North America supporting PUP, along with Rozwell Kid.

In July 2016, Pkew Pkew Pkew joined Direct Hit! on their North American tour with Problem Daughter.

In December 2016, Pkew Pkew Pkew performed at PUP's 2016 Homecoming show at the Danforth Music Hall in Toronto.

From late January to mid - February 2017, Pkew Pkew Pkew joined Anti-Flag and Reel Big Fish on a US tour.

In June 2017, the band signed with SideOneDummy Records and re-issued their debut album with one additional song.

In July 2017, Pkew Pkew Pkew supported The Flatliners on their East Coast tour, alongside Garret Dale.

In September 2018, the band signed to the independent UK label Big Scary Monsters and released the track 'Passed Out'.

In March 2019, the band announced another repress of their '+ONE' album, to be released by the Belgian DIY label Bearded Punk Records as a limited run of 500 copies on Cherry Cola 12" vinyl.

In July 2020, it was announced that their song "Mid 20s Skateboarder" would be included in the video game Tony Hawk's Pro Skater 1+2.

In August 2023, the band announced that they had signed to Stomp Records and that a new album, 'Siiick Days', would be released on 22 September. At the same time, they released the single "The Dumbest Thing I Ever Done" and announced that Kate Maclean had joined the band. A music video for the single was released on 11 August of that year.

== Discography ==
=== Albums ===
- Pkew Pkew Pkew (2016)
- + ONE [re-issued by SideOneDummy] (2017)
- Pkew Pkew Pkew on Audiotree Live (2017)
- Optimal Lifestyles (2019)
- + ONE [re-issued by Bearded Punk Records] (2019)
- Open Bar (2022)
- Siiick Days (2023)

=== EP ===
- Glory Days EP (2013)

=== Singles ===
- Passed Out (2018)
- 65 Nickels (2018)
- I Don't Matter at All (2019)
- Maybe Someday (2022)
- Drinking in the Park (2022)
- The Dumbest Thing I Ever Done (2023)

=== Music videos ===
- Glory Days (2013)
- Mid 20s Skateboarder/Blood clot (2016)
- Prequel to Asshole Pandemic (2016)
- Before We Go Out Drinking (2017)
- Katie Lee + Hoda (2017)
- Cold Dead Hands (2017)
- Passed Out (2019)
- 65 Nickels (2019)
- The Dumbest Thing I Ever Done (2023)
- The Night John Buck Hit Three Home Runs (2023)
- Farside Bathroom (2023)

== See also ==
- Music of Canada
- Canadian rock
