= Rogers Picnic =

- Genre: Indie/Rock/Hip hop
- Dates: July
- Locations: Fort York, Toronto, Ontario, Canada
- Years active: 2007–2008
- Founders: Rogers Communications

The Rogers Picnic was a one-day, annual summer music festival held in Toronto, Ontario, Canada. The festival took place in 2007 and again in 2008.

The first Rogers Picnic, created by Rogers Wireless, was on 29 July 2007, and was held at Toronto's historic Fort York. The line up featured Canadian and international musicians and meshed rock, punk, ska, reggae, hip-hop, and more. Performers included The New Pornographers, The Roots, Tegan and Sara, The Dears, Bad Brains, Apostle of Hustle, Little Brother, Bedouin Soundclash, and Team Canada DJs.

The second Rogers Picnic was on 20 July 2008 at Fort York. The line-up included Tokyo Police Club, Cat Power, Dizzee Rascal, Vampire Weekend, Animal Collective, City and Colour, Born Ruffians, The Carps, and Chromeo.
