= Atticus Clothing =

U.S. clothing brand

- Type: Clothing/Accessory
- Industry: Streetwear
- Founded: 2001
- Headquarters: Carlsbad, California, United States
- Key people: Mark Hoppus, Tom DeLonge, Dale Masters,
- Products: Clothing, accessories, beer
- Website: atticusclothing.com

Atticus is a brand of clothing founded in 2001 by Blink-182 members Mark Hoppus and Tom DeLonge, along with their childhood friend Dylan Anderson.

== Name ==
The name Atticus Clothing was derived from several places, one being the main character's father in the book To Kill a Mockingbird by the author Harper Lee. In addition to the literary connection the name is derived from Herodes Atticus, a Greek rhetorician who spent his fortune supporting music and the arts.

== Logo ==
The Atticus logo, created by Dylan Anderson, depicts a bird lying on its back in an almost cartoon death position, inspired by the To Kill a Mockingbird title. The logo also pays homage to the fictional record label Death Records in the 1974 Brian De Palma film Phantom of the Paradise.

== Music releases ==
The company is heavily influenced by music and released three volumes of their Dragging the Lake compilation CDs. Each CD featured songs from bands such as Blink-182, Alkaline Trio, New Found Glory, Name Taken, Bane, Rocket From The Crypt, Jimmy Eat World, Taking Back Sunday, Death Cab for Cutie, Matchbook Romance, Finch, Alexisonfire, Saosin, Thrice, Lagwagon, The Used, The Starting Line and Coheed and Cambria.

== Discography ==
- Atticus: ...Dragging the Lake (2002)
- Atticus: ...Dragging the Lake, Vol. 2 (2003)
- Atticus: ...Dragging the Lake, Vol. 3 (2005)
- Atticus: IV (2009)
- Atticus Presents: Volume 1 (2009)
- Atticus Atticus V Compilation (2010)
