= VCR (EP) =

- 2005 re-release on SideOneDummy

EP by VCR
- Released: 2003; April 12, 2005 (re-release)
- Recorded: August 2003
- Studio: The Recorditorium (Richmond, Virginia)
- Genre: Dance-punk
- Length: 18:30; 16:24 (re-release)
- Label: Pop Faction; SideOneDummy (re-release)
- Producer: VCR, Jason LaFerrera

VCR chronology
VCR (00000001)	Power Destiny (2006)

Original cover
- 2003 original release with differing track selection

Professional ratings
Review scores
Source	Rating
AllMusic	4/5 stars
Pitchfork Media	7.2/10

VCR is the 2003 debut recording by the American band VCR, originally on Pop Faction Records as a limited-edition and regional release, created solely to sell at shows and give away to friends. When VCR was picked up by SideOneDummy, the album was re-released with a wider distribution in 2005.

== Track listings ==
=== 2003 Pop Faction release ===
1. "Rad" – 2:40
2. "Back In Business" – 2:42
3. "King And Queen Of Winter" – 3:14
4. "Bratcore" – 2:07
5. "DVD" – 3:10
6. "We Are VCR" – 4:37

=== 2005 SideOneDummy release ===
The extended play recording helped gain the attention of SideOneDummy, leading to its re-release in 2005, with a different album cover. "We Are VCR" is not included; instead it contains the demo versions of "Really Something" and "Destroy", which were recorded and released again on the 2006 album Power Destiny. It includes a more thorough album booklet, with lyrics, as well as a different studio mix of the tracks, which was done by Bruce MacFarlane.

1. "Rad" – 2:40
2. "Back In Business" – 2:41
3. "King And Queen Of Winter" – 3:15
4. "Bratcore" – 2:09
5. "DVD" – 3:08
6. "Really Something/Destroy" – 2:41

Note: Although the album lists "Really Something" and "Destroy" as separate tracks, they are actually combined as one audio track on the album.

== Personnel ==
- Chad Middleton – vocals, keyboard
- Mya Anitai – vocals, keyboard
- Casey Tomlin – keyboard
- Steve Smith – keyboard
- Christian Newby – drums

== Production ==
- Producer: VCR, Jason LaFerrera
- Mixing: Bruce MacFarlane for the factory (on the 2005 re-release)
