= HOT (missile) =

French/German anti-tank missile

HOT-3
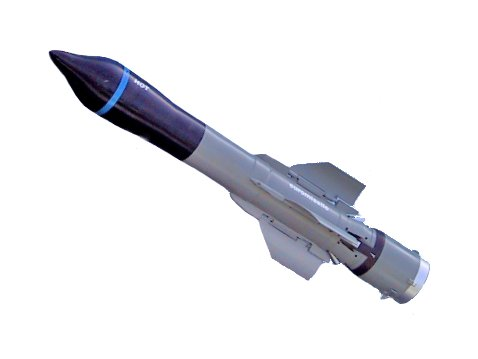
- HOT-3
- Type: Anti-tank guided missile
- Place of origin: France / West Germany

Service history
- Used by: See operators
- Wars: Chadian–Libyan conflict; Iran–Iraq War; 1982 Lebanon War; Gulf War; 2007 Lebanon conflict; Libyan Civil War (2011); Syrian civil war

Production history
- Manufacturer: Euromissile (now MBDA)
- Produced: 1977–present
- Variants: HOT 1, HOT 2, HOT 3

Specifications
- Mass: 24.5 kg
- Length: 1.30 m
- Diameter: 0.15 m
- Wingspan: 0.31 m
- Warhead: Tandem-charge HEAT
- Engine: Two-stage solid fuel rocket
- Operational range: 75-4,300 m
- Maximum speed: 864 km/h (240 m/s)
- Guidance system: SACLOS
- Launch platform: Vehicle, helicopter

External image
- HOT - Vehicles
- HOT missile details

The HOT (French: Haut subsonique Optiquement Téléguidé Tiré d'un Tube, or High Subsonic, Optical, Remote-Guided, Tube-Launched) is a second-generation long-range anti-tank guided missile system. It was developed originally to replace the older SS.11 wire guided missile in French and West German service. It was jointly developed by French company Nord Aviation and the West German Bölkow. Nord Aviation and Bölkow would later merged with other companies to respectively form Aérospatiale and Messerschmitt-Bölkow-Blohm (MBB).

In comparison to the SS.11, HOT has longer range, flies faster, and is semi-automatically guided instead of manually. It has become one of the most successful missiles of its class, with tens of thousands of missiles produced, used by no fewer than a dozen countries worldwide, and validated in combat in several wars. The missile system is also commonly mounted on light and medium armored vehicles, and attack helicopters.

== History ==
HOT entered limited production in 1976, with mass production of 800 missiles a month reached in 1978. HOT initially became operational with the French and West German armies fitted to specialized armored antitank vehicles. In addition, Euromissile received large export orders from Middle East nations at the start of mass production. This was likely due to the situation in the late 1970s where many nations did not want to rely solely on arms purchases from the Soviet Union, combined with the U.S. Congress restrictions on the export sales of the TOW antitank guided missile.

In Europe, the end of the service life of the HOT missile system is in sight with the French opting to purchase Hellfire II missiles for their Tiger-HAD attack helicopters and the Germans planning to transition to the PARS 3 LR. Austria has decommissioned its HOT-carrying tank destroyers, while Spain is transitioning to Spike missiles to replace their HOT missile inventory. The HOT missile continues to be in widespread use in other areas of the world.

== Design and function ==
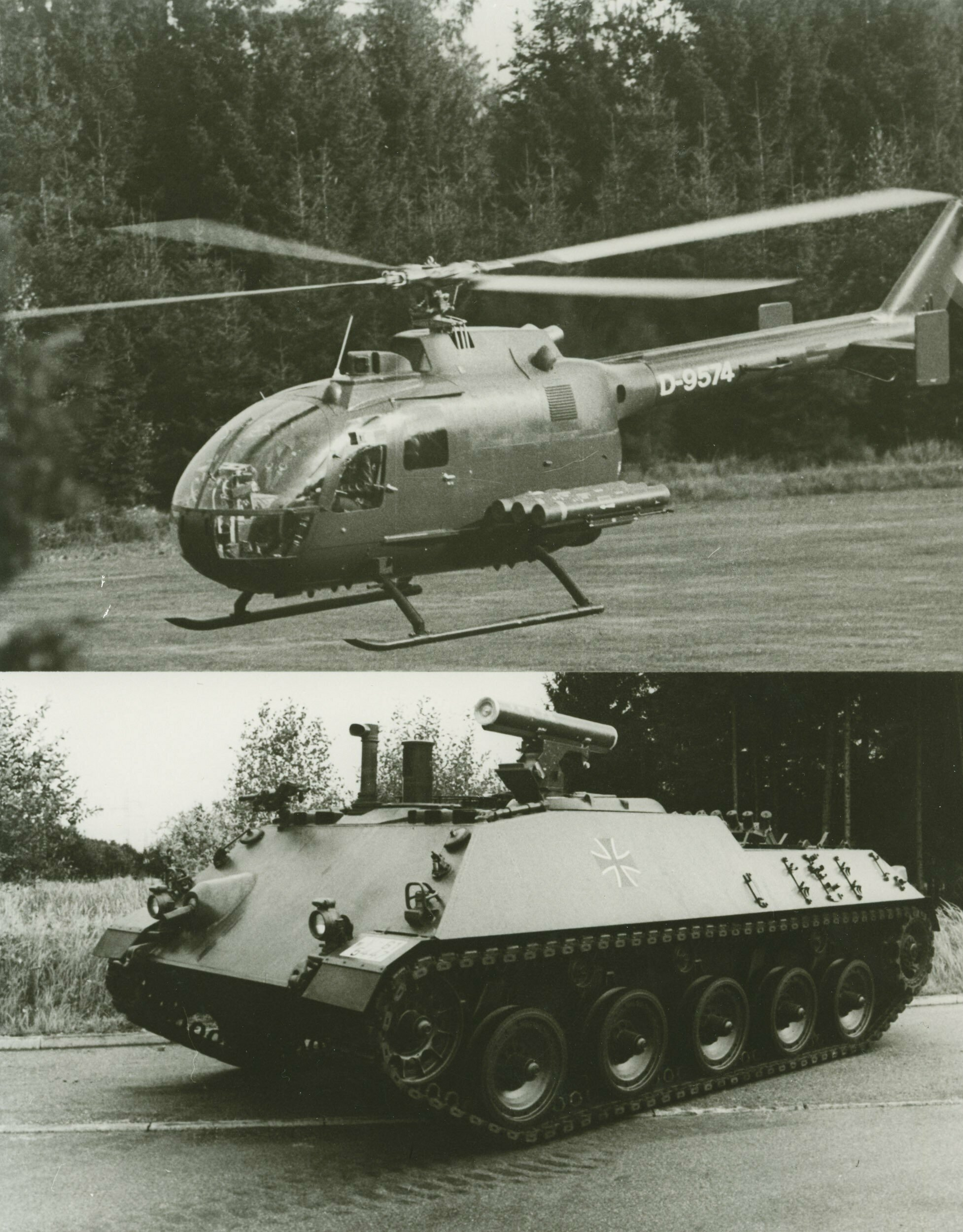
The HOT missile system demonstrated on different platforms: MBB Bo 105 light helicopter and the tracked Raketenjagdpanzer 1 armoured tank destroyer.

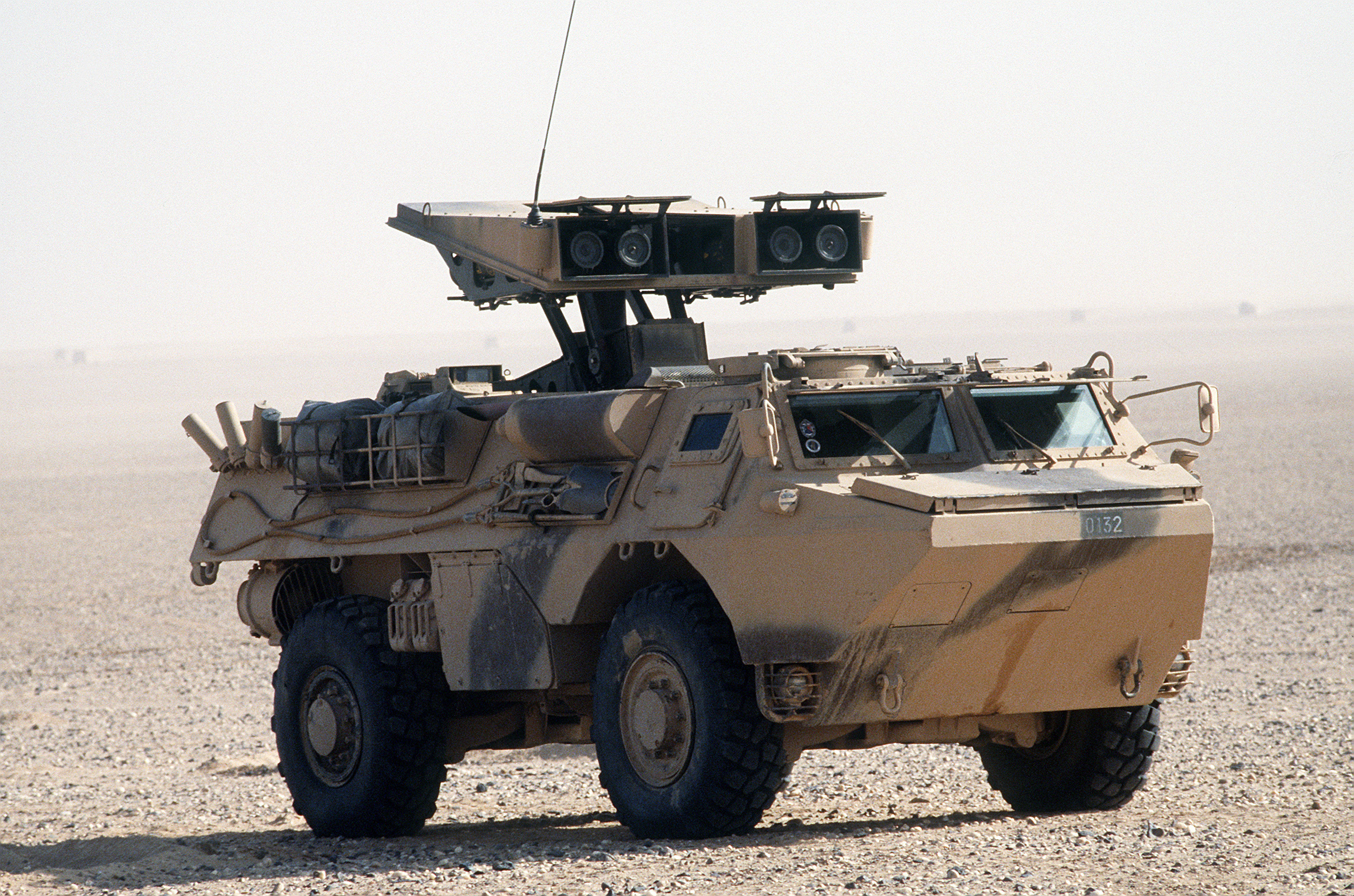
HOT-carrying Véhicule de l'Avant Blindé (VAB) of the French Army

Project studies by both firms began in 1964, at about the same time the US Army began a project that resulted in the BGM-71 TOW missile. Unlike TOW, which entered service in 1973, the development and testing phase for HOT took considerably longer. The design goal was to produce an antitank missile that could be fired from ground vehicles and helicopters; that employed the semi-automatic command to line of sight (SACLOS) guidance system instead of the less reliable manual command to line of sight (MCLOS) system used by the SS.11; had a longer range combined with a better minimum engagement range; had a higher flight speed than the SS.11 reducing flight time; and packed in a sealed container that was also a launcher.

The HOT missile is tube-launched and optically tracked using the SACLOS guidance system with command link through trailing wires which steers the missile using thrust vectoring controls on the sustainer engine during missile flight. When the gunner fires the HOT missile, the missile activates a thermal battery, flares, and a small gas generator spins up the gyro. The same gases for the gyro pop the covers off both ends of the cylindrical container the HOT missile comes packed in. Moments later, both the sustainer engine and the booster are fired, ejecting the missile from the container.

Unlike most antitank missiles, in which the booster burns fully before leaving the container, and then the missile coasts a safe distance before the sustainer engine ignites, HOT's booster burns both inside and outside the container for about one second, giving the missile a high speed. The sustainer engine burns for 17 seconds, a flight time which path exceeds the length of the trailing wires which dictate the maximum range of the missile. Because of the more powerful booster and sustainer engine that burns during its full flight, the HOT missile had a much shorter flight time than any other wire guided antitank missiles when it was introduced. The booster's four nozzles are located at the roots of the four spring out fins. The sustainer engine's single exhaust is located in the rear of the missile body, where a vane controls the missile through thrust vector control as it rotates in flight.

After the missile is fired, all the gunner has to do is keep the target in the sight's cross hairs, and the system will automatically track the missile's rear-facing flares, gather the missile into the gunner's sight, and send commands to steer the missile into the gunner's line of sight. About 50 meters after ejecting from the container, the safety system arms a high-explosive anti-tank (HEAT) shaped charge warhead fuze and will detonate when the outer skin of the two-layer nose cone is crushed to contact with the inside skin, completing an electrical circuit. With this type of fuzing system, the missile does not have to hit the tip of its nose to detonate the warhead. The HOT 1 and HOT 2 use the warhead fuzing system described above.

The latest version of the HOT family, the HOT 3, uses tandem-charge feature to defeat tanks fitted with explosive reactive armor. A laser-proximity fuze located in the front half of the nose measures the range between target and missile. At the correct range, the small nipple on the front nose containing a small HEAT warhead is ejected forward from the missile body to pre-detonate the reactive armor followed by the detonation of main HEAT warhead.

== Performance relative to comparable weapons ==
System	Diameter	Launch weight	Warhead	Armor penetration (est.)	Range (up to)	Maximum speed
HOT-3	150 mm	24.5 kg	6.48 kg, tandem HEAT	1 250 mm	4 300 m	864 km/h
MILAN ADT-ER	115 mm	13.5 kg	? kg, tandem HEAT	1 000 mm, behind ERA	3 000 m	720 km/h
BGM-71E TOW-2A	152 mm	22.7 kg	6.09 kg, tandem HEAT	900 mm, behind ERA	4,000 m	1 000 km/h
9M133 Kornet	152 mm	29.5 kg	7 kg, tandem HEAT	1 000–1 200 mm, behind ERA	5 500 m	900 km/h

== Launch platforms ==
External images
- HOT - Vehicles
- HOT missile details and cut-away
- HOT firing from UTM 800 Turret on VAB vehicle
- UTM 800 turret fitted to Panhard VCR-TH vehicle. Similar to ones supplied Iraq
- French Army VAB mounting MEPISTO HOT Turret
- LANCELOT turret on AMX 10P firing HOT
- LANCELOT HOT turret mounted on AMX 10P side view - in service Saudi Arabia
- HOT UTM 800 Turret Installations

External images
- HOT - Helicopters
- French Army SA342M Gazelle firing HOT missile
- Kuwaiti Air Force SA342K Gazelle with HOT missiles
- German Army MBB BO105P armed with six HOT missiles
- German Army BO105P PAH1 antitank helicopters with HOT missiles

HOT missiles have been deployed on both vehicles and helicopters.

The Bundeswehr upgraded the Raketenjagdpanzer 2 tank destroyer to use the HOT missile in what was designated as the Jaguar 1. The Jaguar 1 mounted a single Euromissile K3S launcher and carried 20 HOT missiles, one of which was carried in the launcher. This tank destroyer was also used by Austria.

France developed a variant of the AMX-10P that substituted an armored four-tube HOT missile launcher called the Lancelot for the vehicle's regular 20 mm cannon turret. The Lancelot turret carries 20 HOT missiles, 4 mounted and 16 stored inside, and uses a sight with X12 magnification and a laser rangefinder. The only known customer is Saudi Arabia.

HOT missiles have also been mounted on wheeled vehicles such as the Panhard VCR/TH and the VAB VCAC with the Mephisto turret. Both the VCR and the VCAC carried four ready-to-launch missiles. The main advantage that the VAB Mephisto turret has over the TH turret is that both the operator and the missiles are both under armor and the Mephisto turret can be retracted flush with the vehicle's top for loading on either the C-130 or C-160 transport aircraft.

In an unusual move, in 1986 Euromissile offered a single-round ground-launched system for HOT missiles called ATLAS (Affut de Tir Leger Au Sol - which translates roughly as light ground-firing mount) for installing on smaller unarmored vehicles, like the Jeep or Land Rover. The object was to field an antitank weapon that long-range patrols could use to engage heavy armor beyond the range of the tank's main cannon. The ATLAS is similar to the TOW mounted on various four-wheel-drive light vehicles. But, unlike the TOW light vehicle mount, there is a shield to protect the gunner against the HOT's booster and sustainer engines, which are both burning as they exit the container. The vehicle mounting the ATLAS is expected to carry a mix of both HOT missiles with antitank warheads and the HOT with the multi-purpose warhead.

HOT anti-tank guided missiles on a SA 342 Gazelle helicopter of the Cyprus National Guard

Shortly after the introduction of HOT by Germany and France on ground vehicles, both nations introduced helicopters in the dedicated antitank role firing the HOT. The French used the Gazelle SA342M helicopter, which carries four HOT missiles in two dual launchers. Germany opted for the Bo-105 PAH-1, which can carry six HOT missiles in two triple launchers. Subsequently, the HOT missile was qualified for launch from other helicopters, such as the German Tiger helicopter (carrying up to eight HOT's in two quad launchers) and the South African Rooivalk helicopter.

== Service history ==
External images
- Viviane night sight
- Viviane fitted to Dauphin SA.361H
- Aerospatiale SA361H Dauphin fitted Viviane night sight and 8 HOT missiles

By 1975, development was complete and evaluations had been performed by various ministries of defence. Mass production commenced in 1976 and the first HOT missiles were fielded in 1978. A night-sight for firing from helicopters, the Viviane, was developed in the early 1980s. In 1985, the HOT-2 followed, with a multipurpose warhead variant called the HOT-2MP entering service in 1992. While less effective in terms of armor penetration, the HOT-2MP also produces fragmentation and incendiary effects.

By 1987, 1,434 launchers and 70,350 missiles had been produced. HOT-3 was brought into service in 1998. It has a tandem shaped charge high-explosive anti-tank (HEAT) warhead able to breach explosive reactive armor, and improved anti-jamming abilities. HOT-3 was selected to be the missile armament of the Tiger attack helicopter for Germany at least until the PARS 3 LR becomes available.

HOT has been used in combat in several wars, including the Iran-Iraq War, Lebanon, Chad, Western Sahara, the Gulf War of 1991 and in Lebanon in May 2007 against the Fatah al-Islam militants in the Nahr el-Bared camp north of Tripoli.

Various reports state that the first combat use of the HOT was with the Iraqi Army during the Iran-Iraq War, launched from Panhard VCR/TH 6x6 wheeled armored vehicles fitted with the UTM-800 turret. Photos have also recorded captured examples of the VCR/TH in service with the Iranian Army.

The 60 SA-342 M Gazelles of the French Division Daguet fired 187 HOTs during the Gulf War; 127 objectives destroyed (around twenty tanks and armored vehicles, more than forty troop transports, fifteen artillery pieces, and numerous support points) in 27 squadron attacks. And the Véhicule de l'Avant Blindé Mephisto around sixty.

In June 2011, for the Opération Harmattan, French Gazelles helicopters fired 425 HOT missiles on various pro-Qaddafi targets as part of the NATO operations enforcing UN Resolution 1973.

The missile has been recently used by the Syrian Army during the Syrian civil war, particularly in the Palmyra offensive.

== Variants ==
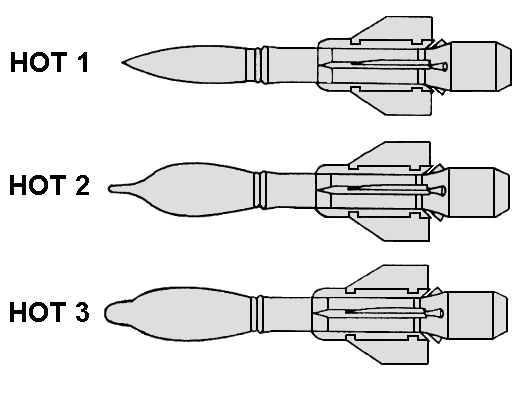

MBDA has taken over Euromissile and now handles production of all current variants, and HOT development.

Designation	Length m	Diameter mm	Wingspan m	Launch weight kg	Warhead kg	Armor penetration (est.) mm	Range m	Speed km/h (m/s)
HOT	1.27	136	0.31	23.5	5 HEAT	800	75–4,000	864 (240)
HOT-2/-2MP	1.30	150	0.31	23.5	5 HEAT	900 (-2); 350 (-2MP)	75–4,000	864 (240)
HOT-3	1.30	150	0.31	24.5	6.48 tandem HEAT	1250	75–4,300	864 (240)

Time to target at maximum range is 17.3 seconds with an average speed of 832 kilometres per hour (231 m/s).

== Operators ==
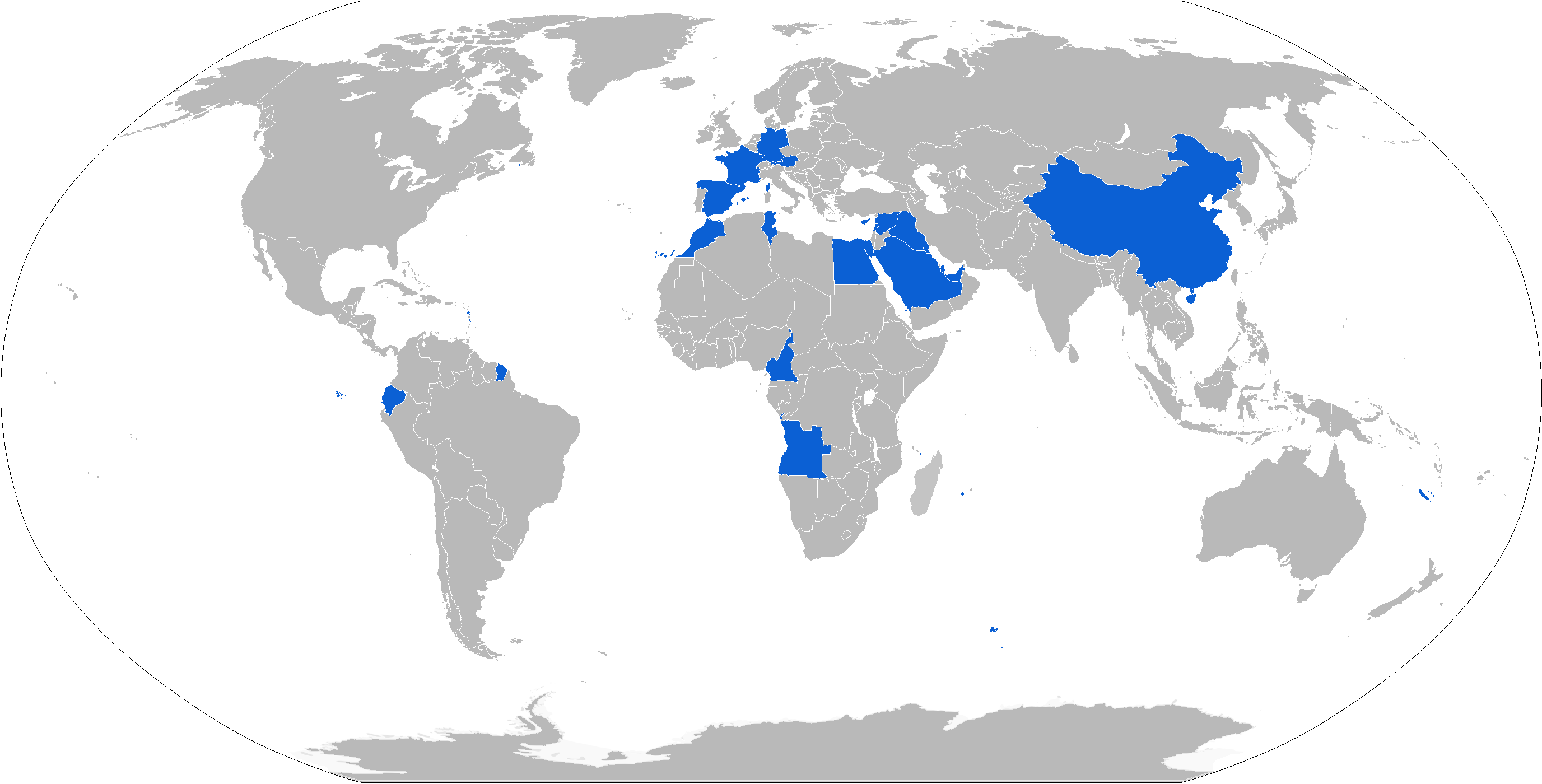
Map with HOT operators in blue

Data extracted from Jane's World Armies Issue 23 and the SIPRI Arms Transfers Database.

=== Current operators ===
- Angola: Delivered in 1986–87 for use on helicopters.
- Austria: HOT-2 and HOT-3 delivered in 1996–98 for use with Jaguar 1 (now decommissioned).
- Cameroon: Delivered in 1982 for use on Gazelle helicopters. (582 HOT-2/3)
- Chad: Used on Panhard M3s.
- China: Delivered in 1988–89 for use on Gazelle helicopters.
- Cyprus: Delivered in 1988 for use on Gazelle helicopters and VAB-VCAC. ~500 missiles.
- Ecuador: Delivered in 1982–83 for use on SA-341 helicopters.
- Egypt: Delivered in 1978 and 1985 for use on Gazelle helicopters.
- France: Used on Gazelle helicopters and VAB-VCAC.
- Germany: Used on Tiger helicopters and Jaguar 1 tank destroyers.
- Iraq: Delivered in 1978, 1980, and 1982 for use on Gazelle helicopters and VCR-TH.
- Kuwait: HOT and HOT-2 delivered in 1977 and 1999 for use on Gazelle helicopters.
- Lebanon: HOT missiles delivered in 2007 and 2017 for use on Gazelle helicopters and VAB Mephisto Vehicles.
- Morocco: HOT and HOT-2 delivered in 1983 and 1991 for helicopter and vehicle use.
- Qatar: Delivered in 1984–85 for use on Gazelle helicopters and VAB-VCAC.
- Saudi Arabia: HOT and HOT-2 delivered in 1989 and 1997 for use on AMX-10.
- Spain: Delivered in 1979 and 1990 for use on BO-105CB.
- Syria: Delivered in 1981 for use on Gazelle helicopters.
- Tunisia: In service on Gazelle SA-342 helicopters.
- United Arab Emirates: Delivered in 1980 for use on Gazelle helicopters.

== See also ==
- BGM-71 TOW – (United States)
- 9M113 Konkurs – (Soviet Union)
- HJ-8 – (China)
