= Panhard M3 =

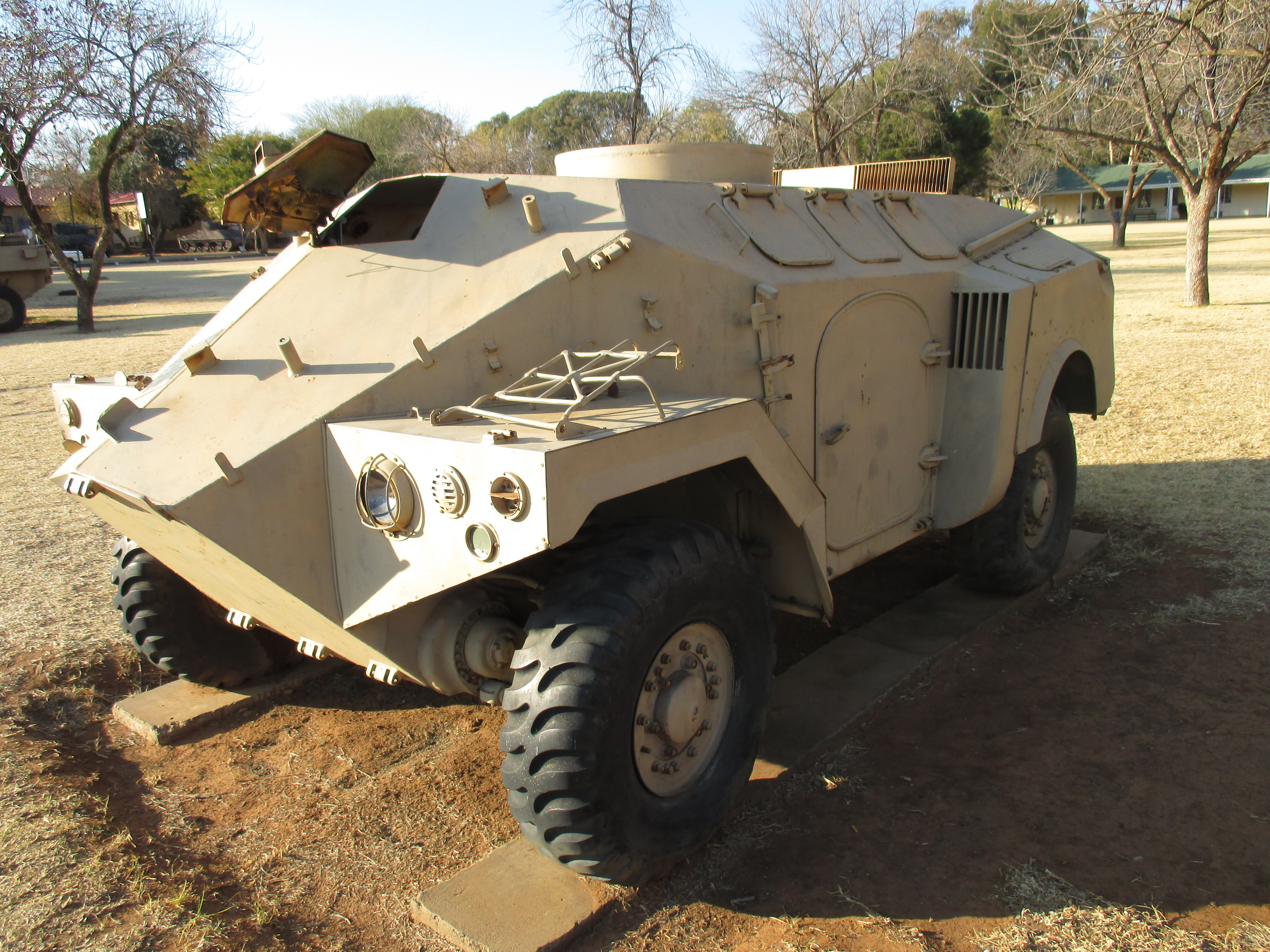
- M3 VTT "Bosbok" at Tempe School of Armour, Bloemfontein
- Type: Armoured personnel carrier
- Place of origin: France

Service history
- Used by: See Operators
- Wars: Portuguese Colonial War; Angolan Civil War; Lebanese Civil War; Iran–Iraq War; Gulf War; Internal conflict in Burma; Iraqi Civil War (2014–2017); Yemeni Civil War (2015–present)

Production history
- Designed: 1968
- Manufacturer: Panhard
- Unit cost: US$166,000 (1986)
- Produced: 1971–1986
- No. built: 1,180
- Variants: See Variants

Specifications
- Mass: 6.1 tonnes (6.7 short tons; 6.0 long tons)
- Length: 4.45 m (14 ft 7 in)
- Width: 2.4 m (7 ft 10 in)
- Height: 2 m (6 ft 7 in) (hull)
- Crew: 2 (commander, driver) + 10 passengers
- Main armament: Various
- Engine: Panhard Model 4HD four-cylinder air-cooled petrol 90 hp (67 kW) at 4,700 rpm
- Power/weight: 14.75 hp/tonne (10.9 kW/tonne)
- Suspension: Independent; coil springs
- Ground clearance: 0.35m
- Fuel capacity: 165 litres
- Operational range: 600 km
- Maximum speed: 90 km/h (56 mph)

The Panhard M3 VTT (French: Véhicule de Transport de Troupes) is an amphibious armoured personnel carrier. Developed as a private venture for the export market, the M3 was built with the same mechanical and chassis components as the Panhard AML range of light armoured cars. The two vehicle types share a 95% interchangeability of automotive parts. The M3 is an extremely versatile design which can be configured for a wide variety of auxiliary battlefield roles. The most popular variants of the base personnel carrier included an armoured ambulance, a mobile command post, and an internal security vehicle. It could also be fitted with a wide variety of turrets and armament, ranging from a single general-purpose machine gun to medium calibre autocannon.

The M3's relatively light weight and the location of its air and exhaust outlets on the hull roof made it possible to design it as an amphibious vehicle. The M3 is propelled at a modest speed of 4 km/h through water by all four wheels. Although never adopted by the French Army, the M3 series was procured in vast quantities by foreign armies and security forces, especially in Africa and the Middle East. By the time production ceased in 1986, it was the most common wheeled APC produced by any Western nation in the world.

== Development history ==
The Panhard M3 was the result of a 1959 design study requested by the Direction des Etudes et Fabrications d'Armement (DEFA) for an amphibious APC based on the same chassis as the Panhard AML. However, the design proposal was not adopted by the French Army. In 1967, design work on a single prototype began anyway, with the objective of export sales. While the amphibious APC programme was underway, the concept was simply known as the Véhicule Transport de Troupes, or VTT.

The first VTT prototype was completed in August 1969 and incorporated a very simple boxlike hull with vertical sides, a flat roofline, and a single 7.5mm AA-52 machine gun in a Creusot-Loire CAFL-38S turret. External access to the hull was through two large entry doors on each side and twin doors at the rear of the troop compartment. The AML chassis and drive train underwent some detail modifications but the overall design remained basically unchanged despite the addition of the new hull. The same Panhard four-cylinder engine type developing 97hp was retained from the AML; however, due to the much heavier hull this left it somewhat underpowered for its weight class. The engine was also relocated from the rear of the chassis to the centre, directly behind the driver's position, to accommodate the rear troop compartment. The wheelbase of the prototype was also increased from 2.5 to 2.7m and the track from 1.6 to 2m.

One major criticism of the early VTT was that there was no provision for the embarked troops to fire their personal weapons from inside the vehicle, necessitating a minor redesign of the hull. The new hull had sloped rather than perfectly vertical sides angled for ballistic ricochet; the upper part of each hull side was also provided with three roof hatches. The hatch covers could be lifted for observation and to fire personal weapons at external targets. The two large doors at the rear of the troop compartment were also provided with firing ports. It was this version of the VTT which was approved for serial production as the Panhard M3 in April 1971. At the time, the two largest foreign clients for Panhard military vehicles were Saudi Arabia and Iraq, both of which had invested heavily in the AML series and were persuaded to purchase large numbers of M3s to complement their preexisting fleet. The first production M3s were manufactured for the Royal Saudi Army, which ordered 150. Another 60 were ordered by Iraq shortly afterwards. By 1972, more export orders had been placed by the national armies of Portugal, Spain, Ireland, Lebanon, and Zaire. The United Arab Emirates Army went on to become the single largest operator of the M3, ordering 198 in 1978. The Iraqi Army was a close second, with 156 in service. The last production vehicles were completed for Iraq and Algeria and delivered by 1985. At this time, 1,180 M3s had been produced. The vehicle type was in service in 26 nations worldwide.

The M3 design had remained identical in over two decades of serial production, and Panhard recognized that its basic technology had become quite dated by the 1980s. In 1983 the firm began work on a modernised derivative of the M3 known as the Panhard Buffalo. The Buffalo had an increased wheelbase and could be fitted with either a diesel or petrol engine. Its hull was fitted with external stowage boxes that gave it somewhat bulkier appearance than its predecessor; these boxes were also designed to detach during a land mine explosion, and thereby preserve the integrity of the hull. The internal layout of the new vehicle was identical to the M3 and parts compatibility was retained with the M3 and AML. The Panhard Buffalo did not enjoy the same export success as the M3 and serial production was only carried out on an as-needed basis. A very small number was purchased by Colombia and several Francophone African states.

== Description ==
The Panhard M3 was built on the drive train and chassis of the Panhard AML, albeit with a few detail modifications such as a longer wheelbase and wider track. Nearly all of its mechanical components are interchangeable with those found on the AML. The vehicle is fully amphibious and can enter water with minimal preparation. It is propelled and steered in water by its wheels, but was designed for crossing lakes and small rivers rather than deploying at sea. The M3 lacks specialised night vision equipment and is not normally fitted with an NBC overpressure system, although this was offered as an option by Panhard.

The hull of the M3 is of all-welded steel construction varying in thickness from 8mm to 12mm. The hull has a horizontal roofline and a pointed, tapering front with a well-sloped glacis plate, similar to that of the AML. Both hull sides are vertical to a point before sloping inwards to accommodate additional crew hatches. The bottom of the hull structure is welded to a shallow vee to partly deflect the explosive force of a land mine.

The driver is seated at the front of the vehicle and provided with a single hatch cover in the glacis plate opening to the right. The hatch cover is fitted with three integral periscopes for driving when it is closed. The engine and transmission are housed in a compartment directly to the driver's rear. Air is drawn through intakes in the hull roof, with the exhaust pipes running on either side of the roofline. All the interior space to the rear of the engine and transmission is the troop compartment. Aside from the driver, the M3 can carry eleven passengers. Two are seated in the centre of the hull, three on either side of the hull facing outwards, and another three facing the rear. There are three hatches on either side of the hull which lift upwards for observation or engaging targets in the surrounding terrain with personal weapons. There are also two auxiliary hatches in the roofline, one directly to the driver's rear and another at the very rear of the troop compartment. The infantry section debarks from two entry doors on either side of the hull or from two entry doors at the rear of the hull. If needed, the troop compartment can be reconfigured to carry up to a tonne of cargo.

The M3 is powered by a four-cylinder, air-cooled Panhard 4HD petrol engine inherited from the AML. This engine has a diminutive 2-litre displacement and a compression ratio of 7:1, enabling it to run on low octane fuel. It had a reliable reputation and was rated for a mileage of 26,000 kilometres before needing major overhaul. However, the engine was also regarded as somewhat underpowered for the M3 design and unsuitable for propelling the APC at higher speeds off-road.

== Variants ==
- M3 VTT: Standard production model. This was normally armed with a single general-purpose machine gun mounted externally in front of the commander's hatch. Different gun shields were fitted to the machine gun depending on the type specified, although the most common choices were the FN MAG, the Rheinmetall MG3, the AA-52, and the Browning M1919. Twin machine gun mounts could also be fitted.
- M3 VAT: Repair and recovery variant. This carried a generator, inspection lamps, tow bars, cables, and welding equipment. The number of passengers was reduced to three.
- M3 VDA: Air defence variant armed with twin Hispano-Suiza 820 SL 20mm autocannon in a one-man turret. The weapons have a maximum elevation of +85° and a depression of -5°, and a cyclic rate of fire of 200 rounds per minute or up to 1,000 rounds per minute if the vehicle is stabilised by four hydraulic jacks. There are 650 stowed rounds of 20mm ammunition on board. The turret is fully powered and can be traversed 360° in three seconds, or elevated to maximum elevation in two seconds. It is also provided with an ESD RA-20 Doppler radar with the capacity to track four incoming targets simultaneously at a range of 8 km. This was the heaviest M3 variant to ever reach production, and weighs over 7 tonnes.
- M3 VLA: Engineering variant fitted with a 2.2m-wide bulldozer blade for clearing obstacles. This can carry five passengers but most of the troop compartment has been reconfigured for internal stowage.
- M3 VPC: Mobile command post variant with mapboards and extra radio equipment. The troop compartment has been reconfigured for the placement of teletype sets and short-range as well as long-range communications equipment. The VPC had four batteries instead of the usual two and six antenna mounts.
- M3 VTS: Armoured ambulance variant reconfigured to carry four stretchers in the troop compartment. It has an unusually large one-piece rear door rather than the smaller twin rear doors on the VTT.
- M3 Toucan: Variant armed with an M693 dual-feed or M621 single-feed 20mm autocannon and a co-axial machine gun mounted externally on a GIAT Toucan 1 cupola. The autocannon has an elevation of +50° and a depression of -13°, allowing it to be used against air and ground targets.
- M3 VTM: Mortar tractor variant. This was a modified VTT with the crew compartment reconfigured for ammunition stowage and a hitch for towing a heavy mortar.
- M3 VPM: Mortar carrier variant with a turreted 81mm gun-mortar. This was a VTT with an extensively modified roofline that eliminated most of the crew hatches and added a large turret ring, necessary to accommodate the size of the mortar turret. The VPM was the most heavily armed variant of the M3 ever proposed. It had a crew of four and could carry 60 mortar projectiles in its hull.
- M3 VTT 60 B: Mortar carrier variant with a turreted 60mm gun-mortar. This was a VTT modified to carry the same Brandt Mle CM60A1 gun-mortar as the Panhard AML-60, albeit in a smaller turret which eliminated the co-axial machine guns. Rather, a single machine gun was mounted externally over the rearmost roof hatch.
- M3 VTT TH: Tank destroyer variant armed with a mount for four HOT anti-tank guided missiles. The missile mount has a maximum elevation of +22° and a depression of -10°. Ten additional missiles are stowed inside the hull. The VTT TH has a crew of three. Like the M3 VTS, the VTT TH has a single one-piece rear door rather than the smaller twin doors normally found on the standard VTT.
- M3 Internal Security: Internal security variant. This had a slightly revised crew compartment able to accommodate ten passengers, as well as twin grenade launchers mounted externally at the rearmost hatch for firing riot control agents.
- Bosbok: M3 VTT produced in South Africa under licence. The Bosbok was almost completely identical to the baseline VTT, but was powered by a South African six-cylinder, liquid-cooled engine. Only 3 were ever produced, as the South African military shelved the programme to refocus on the development of the Ratel infantry fighting vehicle.

=== Upgrades ===
A number of defence contractors offer extensive overhauls of the M3 chassis and hull to extend the vehicle's service life and improve its utility on modern battlefields. One particularly ambitious rebuild was proposed by Saymar, an Israeli firm, for the M3 VTT as well as the VLA and VPC variants. This entailed the replacement of the elderly Model 4HD petrol engine with a more fuel-efficient Toyota 2LT diesel engine. Other upgrades included a modified electrical system with a new voltage regulator and starter, the installation of an air conditioning unit, the replacement of the M3's drum brakes with new disc brakes, powered steering, and a new intercom and telecommunications system. The VLA rebuild includes the addition of a 2-tonne recovery crane to the base vehicle, while the VPC rebuild incorporates new mapboards and increased interior lighting.

Another M3 modernisation programme is being marketed by a subsidiary of the Saudi Military Industries Corporation. As part of the Saudi rebuild, the Model 4HD petrol engine is replaced by a new four-cylinder, liquid-cooled diesel turbocharged engine developing 102 hp (75 kW). Other upgrades include power steering, vacuum brakes, and the replacement of the Panhard electromagnetic clutch with a more conventional hydraulic pressure plate clutch.

== Combat history ==
=== Middle East ===
At least 60 M3 VTTs were delivered to the Lebanese Army in 1970-73 and saw considerable action during the Lebanese Civil War (1975–1990), with some being loaned to the Internal Security Forces (ISF) in 1976. Following the collapse of the Lebanese Armed Forces (LAF) in January that year, a significant number of these vehicles fell into the hands of the competing militias, notably the Lebanese Arab Army (LAA), the Army of Free Lebanon (AFL), the People's Liberation Army (PLA), Al-Mourabitoun, Kataeb Regulatory Forces (KRF), and the Tigers Militia. A few M3 VTTs were again captured by the Lebanese Forces (LF) militia from the Lebanese Army during the Elimination War in 1990, and remained in service with the LF Military Police corps until the end of the Civil War in October that year.

Ireland purchased a number of vehicles in the early 1970s in the context of the internal security problems arising from the paramilitary activity in Northern Ireland. The vehicles were not well suited to the role, having a very distinct sound signature whilst the twin FN MAGs in the Creusot-Loire TL.21.80 turret were not capable of accurate fire. A small number were deployed with the Irish UN forces in Lebanon but were regarded as underpowered and lacking manoeuvrability and were eventually replaced with Finnish SISU XA-180 APCs.

== List of operators ==
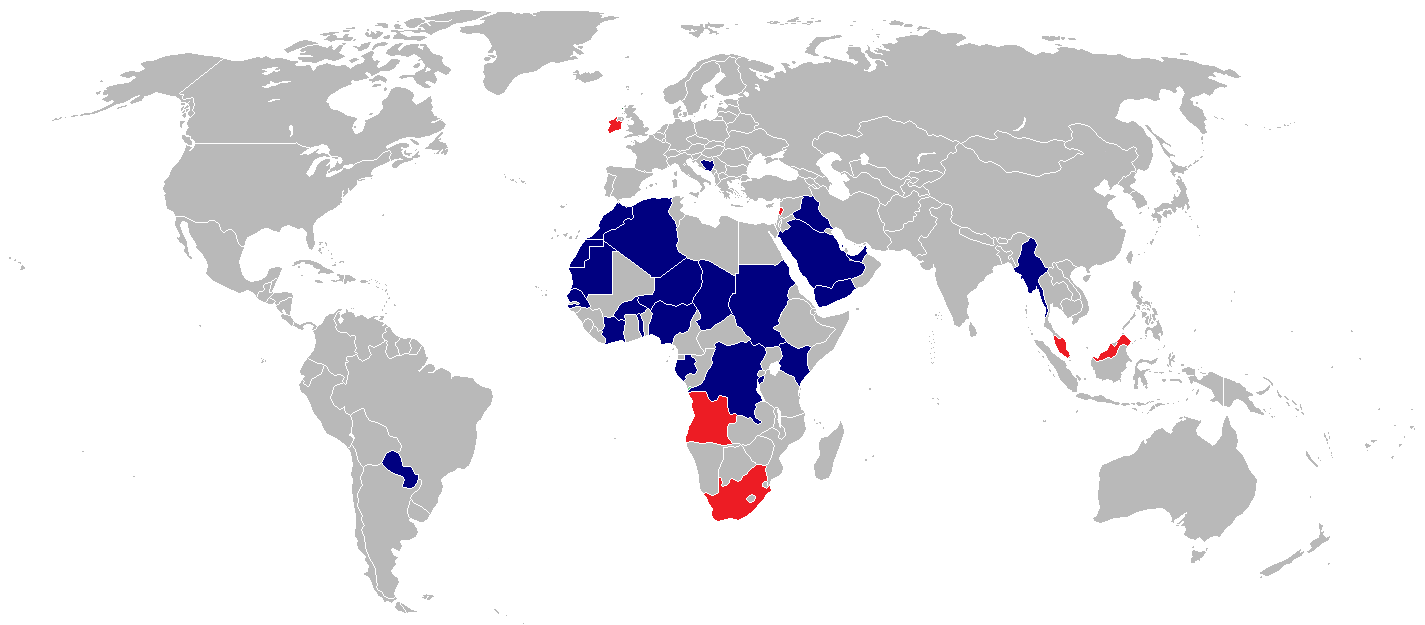
M3 VTT operators, past and present. Blue denotes contemporary operators, red former.

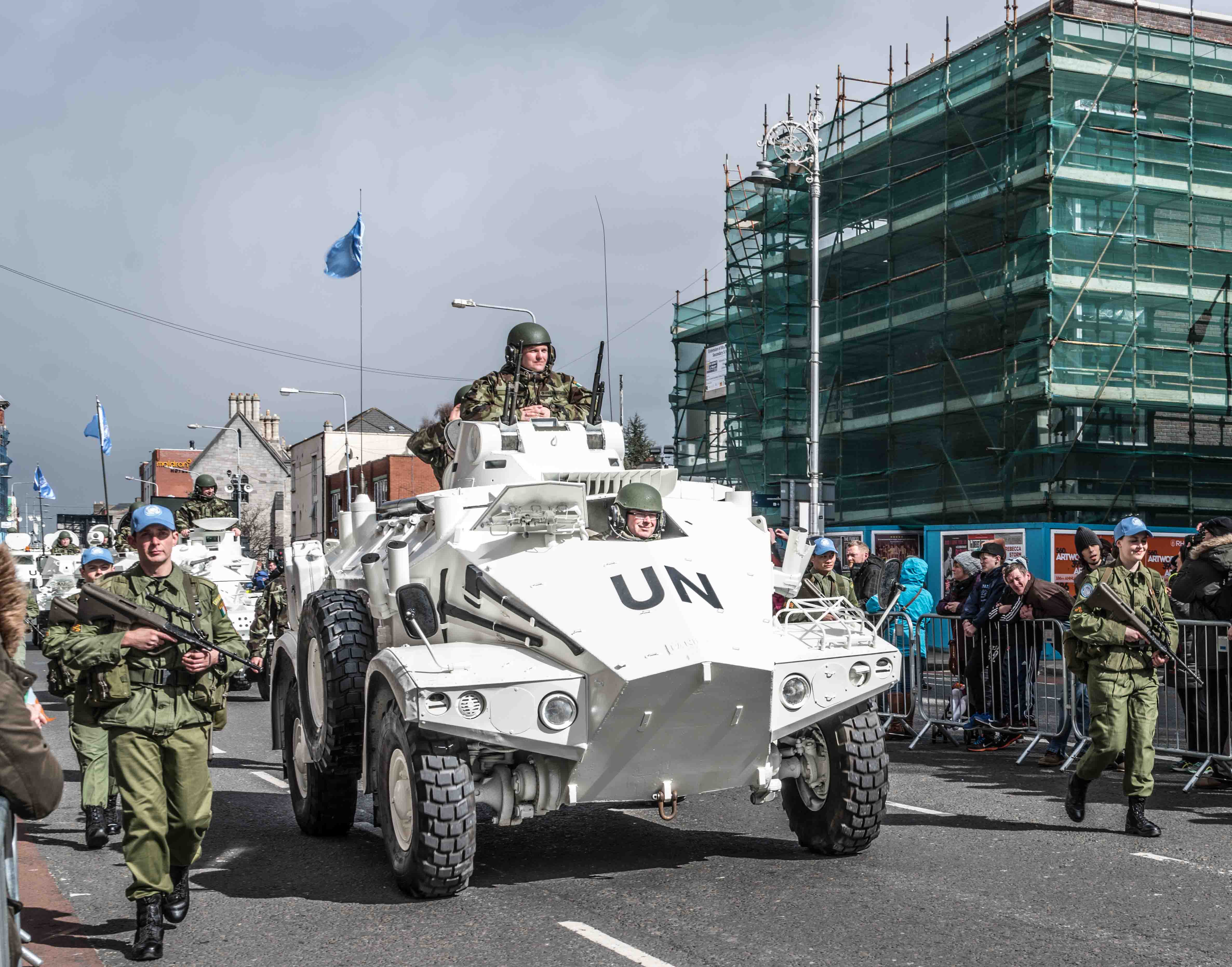
Irish Panhard M3 in UN colours.

=== Current operators ===
- United Arab Emirates: 246
- Algeria: 55; 50 operational.
- Bahrain: 110
- Bosnia-Herzegovina: 11 donated by Abu Dhabi.
- Burkina Faso: 13
- Burundi: 9
- Chad: 15
- Republic of the Congo: 9
- Democratic Republic of the Congo: 58
- Gabon: 7
- Iraq: 244; 44 operational in 2012.
- Ivory Coast: 12
- Kenya: 12
- Lebanon: 30; 15 operational.
- Myanmar: 10 M3VTT; all modernized in Israel in 2010.
- Mauritania: 12
- Morocco: 54
- Niger: 32
- Nigeria: 18
- Paraguay
- Rwanda
- Sahrawi Republic: 5; captured from Morocco during the Western Sahara War.
- Saudi Arabia: 150; all modernized by the Military Industries Corporation.
- Senegal: 16
- Sudan: 16
- Togo: 5
- Yemen

=== Former operators ===
- Angola: 8; inherited from Portugal.
- Ireland: 44
- Malaysia: 37 - use by Malaysian Royal Armoured Corps
- Portugal: Between 6 and 8 purchased from France in 1970; all abandoned in Angola after the Alvor Agreement.
- Spain: 23
- National Liberation Front of Angola: 1
- South Africa: Denoted as the Bosbok. At least 3 were built under licence.

== See also ==
- Panhard AML
- Panhard VCR
- List of AFVs
