= Sounding a Mosaic =

Studio album by Bedouin Soundclash
- Released: September 7, 2004
- Genre: Reggae, ska, alternative rock
- Length: 54:04
- Label: Stomp, SideOneDummy
- Producer: Darryl Jenifer

Bedouin Soundclash chronology
Root Fire (2001)	Sounding a Mosaic (2004)	Street Gospels (2007)

Professional ratings
Review scores
Source	Rating
AllMusic	4/5 stars
Music Emissions	Indie Classic

Sounding a Mosaic is the second album from the Canadian rock band Bedouin Soundclash. The album was released on September 7, 2004. Recorded in Montreal and produced by Darryl Jenifer of Bad Brains, the album spawned the hit single "When the Night Feels My Song" which reached #1 on the Canada singles chart. The album had two more singles, "Shelter" and "Gyasi Went Home". The album was certified platinum by the CRIA with over 100,000 copies sold across Canada.

== Track listing ==
All songs written by Bedouin Soundclash unless noted otherwise.

1. "When the Night Feels My Song" – 3:07
2. "Shelter" – 3:15
3. "Living in Jungles" – 2:26
4. "Money Worries" featuring Vernon Maytone (Maytone) – 3:58
5. "Gyasi Went Home" – 2:26
6. "Shadow of a Man" – 5:02
7. "Jeb Rand" – 5:02
8. "Criminal" – 4:21
9. "Murder on the Midnight Wire" – 3:58
10. "Music My Rock" – 3:24
11. "Rude Boy Don't Cry" – 2:53
12. "Immigrant Workforce" – 3:21
13. "Nothing to Say" – 3:43
14. "Money Worries (E-Clair Refix)" (Maytone, Bedouin Soundclash) – 4:08
15. "Rude Boy Abroad (Lazare Breakdub)" – 3:00

== Singles ==
- "When the Night Feels My Song"
- "Shelter"
- "Gyasi Went Home"

== Credits ==
- All songs written by Bedouin Soundclash except "Money Worries" written by Vernon Maytone.
- Produced by Darryl Jenifer
- Engineered by Greg Smith
- Recorded at DNA Studios, Montreal
- Mastered by Rod Shearer
- Artwork/Design by Jay Malinowski

== Other information ==
- The song "Jeb Rand" is about the character (of the same name) from the 1947 film Pursued, starring Robert Mitchum as Jeb.
- The song "When the Night Feels My Song" is featured in a 2006 commercial for Zellers. The song is also featured in a 2006 T-Mobile advert in the UK, in the interstitials and credits for Kids' CBC from 2007 to 2013, and is also featured on MuchMusic's compilation album, Big Shiny Tunes 10.
- The line 'Yuh nuh ready fi dis yet, boy' in "Living in Jungles" comes from the Tanya Stephens song "Yuh Nuh Ready Fi Dis Yet".
- The line 'Murderer, blood is on your shoulder' in "Living in Jungles" comes from the Buju Banton song "Murderer"; and the line 'Walk like a champion, talk like a champion' comes from another Buju Banton song "Champion". Both songs are found on Buju's 1995 album 'Til Shiloh.

== Charts ==
Chart (2006)	Peak position
U.S. Billboard Top Reggae Albums	9

Singles

Year	Single	Chart	Position
2005	"When the Night Feels My Song"	Canada	4
2005	"When the Night Feels My Song"	UK	24
