= Street Gospels =

Studio album by Bedouin Soundclash
- Released: August 21, 2007
- Recorded: June 6th-7th, 2007 at Iguana Studios, Toronto Ontario
- Genre: Rock, reggae
- Length: 42:12
- Label: Dine Alone Records; SideOneDummy Records
- Producer: Darryl Jenifer

Bedouin Soundclash chronology
| Sounding a Mosaic (2004) | Street Gospels (2007) | Light the Horizon (2010) |

Professional ratings
Review scores
| Source | Rating |
|---|---|
| AbsolutePunk.net | 91% |
| Allmusic | 4/5 stars |

Street Gospels is the third album by Canadian reggae band Bedouin Soundclash. It was released on Dine Alone Records on August 21, 2007. In the UK the album was released on August 20 through SideOneDummy Records.

The song "St. Andrews" features guest vocals from Alexisonfire's Wade McNeil. The songs "Until We Burn in the Sun (The Kids Just Want a Love Song)" and "Nico on the Night Train" are featured on a sampler from Dine Alone Records.

The album debuted at #2 on the Canadian Albums Chart, selling over 8,000 copies in its first week. The album was certified Gold by the CRIA in 2008 for sales of over 50,000 copies in Canada.

== Track listing ==
All tracks written and composed by Bedouin Soundclash.

1. "Until We Burn in the Sun (The Kids Just Want a Love Song)" – 3:54
2. "Walls Fall Down" – 2:31
3. "St. Andrews" – 3:01
4. "Trinco Dog" – 2:58
5. "Hush" – 1:57
6. "Bells of '59" – 3:58
7. "Higher Ground" – 2:14
8. "12:59 Lullaby" – 3:43
9. "Nico on the Night Train" – 4:33
10. "Gunships" – 2:50
11. "Jealousy and the Get Free" – 3:34
12. "Midnight Rockers" – 3:47
13. "Hearts in the Night" – 3:03

=== Enhanced CD Bonus ===
1. "DisGeneration" - 2:25

== Charts ==
| Chart (2007) | Peak position |
|---|---|
| Canadian Albums Chart | 2 |
| U.S. Billboard Top Reggae Albums | 4 |

== Singles ==
- "Walls Fall Down"
- "St. Andrews"
- "12:59 Lullaby"
- "Until We Burn in the Sun"
- "Hearts in the Night"
