= VCR (band) =

American punk rock band

- Origin: Richmond, Virginia, U.S.
- Genres: Synth punk; dance-punk; sass
- Years active: 2002–2007
- Past members: Mya Anitai; Chad Middleton; Christian Newby; Stephen Smith; Casey Tomlin

VCR is an American punk rock band with synthpop leanings. The band formed in November 2002 in Richmond, Virginia, with a relatively unique lineup of a drummer, a bassist, and three synthesizer players.

The band released their debut self-titled EP on the Richmond-based label Pop Faction in 2003. The release was limited to roughly 1000 copies. After no touring, the band was signed by SideOneDummy Records in 2005. The label re-released the band's debut EP with a slightly altered track listing that year. In 2006, the band released their first full-length album, Power Destiny.

In 2007 the band played their last show. In 2011 the Misfits Cassette was re-released on vinyl by Riot Style Records.

== Band members ==
Final lineup

- Chad Middleton – vocals, synthesizer, sampler
- Stephen Smith – bass
- Mya Anitai – vocals, synthesizer
- Casey Tomlin – synthesizer
- Christian Newby – drums

== Discography ==
- VCR (EP) (2003, Pop Faction Records; re-released in 2005 by SideOneDummy)
- Power Destiny (2006, SideOneDummy)
- Misfits Cassette Tape (2006, Ctrl+C Ctrl+V)

=== Featured on ===
- v/a – Atticus... Dragging the Lake 3 (2005, SideOneDummy) – VCR contributes "Bratcore" on track 16.
- v/a – Warped Tour Compilation 2006 (2006, SideOneDummy) – VCR contributes "Do You Wanna Triumph?" on disc 1, track 19.
