= Panhard VCR =

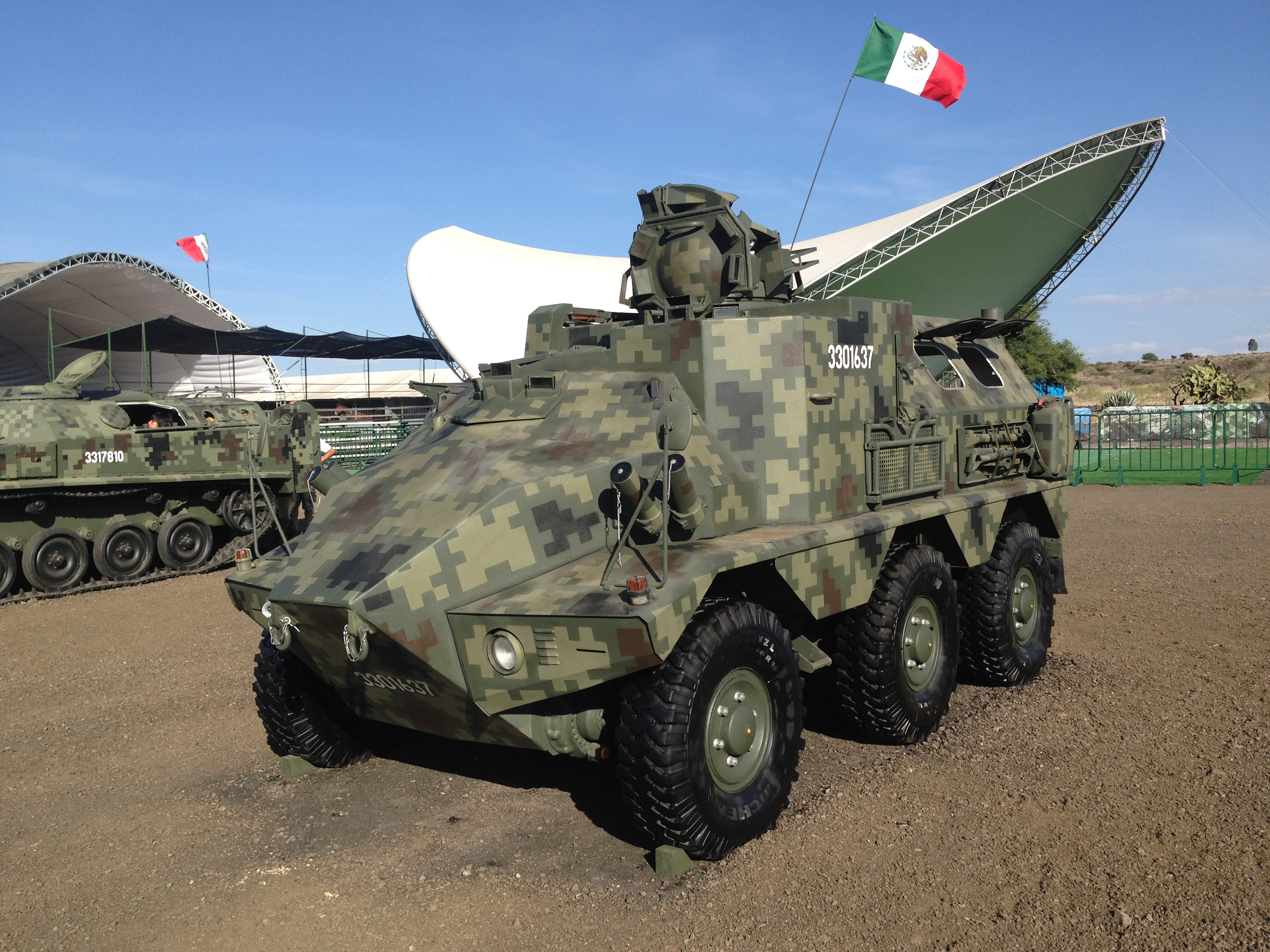
- Mexican Panhard VCR in 2018
- Type: Armored personnel carrier
- Place of origin: France

Service history
- In service: 1979–present
- Used by: See Operators
- Wars: Iran–Iraq War; Gulf War; Iraq War; War in Iraq (2013-17)

Production history
- Manufacturer: Panhard
- Produced: 1979

Specifications
- Mass: 7.9 t
- Length: 4.88 m
- Width: 2.5 m
- Height: 2.13 m
- Crew: 3+9
- Armor: 12 mm
- Main armament: 12.7 mm MG or HOT missile
- Engine: Peugeot PRV V-6; 145 hp
- Power/weight: 18.35 hp/tonne
- Suspension: 6×6 wheel
- Operational range: 700 km
- Maximum speed: 90 km/h

The Panhard VCR (Véhicule de Combat à Roues, French for Wheeled Combat Vehicle) is a light armored personnel carrier (APC) designed by Panhard for the export market and later used by several countries. After Iraq ordered French turrets in September 1974 capable of launching antitank guided missiles (ATGM), the Panhard VCR was developed at the request of the Iraqis for vehicles with which to mate these ATGM-launcher turrets. This resulted in the largest order of VCRs, 100, for Iraq.

== Description ==
The VCR is a 6×6 wheeled APC designed in the late 1970s and is based on the earlier 4×4 M-3 APC which had been a huge success for Panhard on the export market, with over 1,200 built. Production of the VCR began in 1979. The center pair of wheels can be raised when the vehicle is operated on roads (when down all six wheels drive). The engine is located in the front to the right, with the driver in the front-center of the vehicle. The VCR has 8 mm of steel armor on all sides except the front which has 12 mm. This gives protection against 12.7 mm AP rounds in the front and against 7.62 mm AP rounds on all other sides.

The basic VCR is the APC version, the VCR/TT (Transport de Troupes), designed such that various weapons can be mated with the basic vehicle in a series of variants. The basic weapons option was either a 7.62mm light machine gun or a 12.7 mm heavy machine gun, on a ring mount located on the left-front roof. The VCR can also be fitted with a ring mount with a one-man armored turret with a 7.62 mm machine gun or a one-man armored powered turret mounting a 20-mm automatic cannon located at the front-center of the vehicle roof. One option that led to the first large export order from Iraq for a hundred VCR vehicles was a tank-destroyer version of the VCR/TT fitted with an antitank missile turret for launching the HOT wire guided ATGM (antitank guided missile). The ATGM variant was known as the VCR/TH (Tourelle HOT). The VCR/TH mounts four HOT missiles on the turret ready to fire with ten reloads inside the vehicle. There was a less expensive version of the VCR/TH offered that mounted the MCT cupola which fires the shorter range MILAN antitank missile, but there were no orders for this version. Besides the three crew, the basic VCR/TT can transport nine infantrymen.

Other versions included:

VCR/AT
A recovery vehicle, the VCR/AT, with a heavy duty crane mounted on the roof over the back side, tool chest for two mechanics, working bench, welding equipment, spare parts and a towing bar.

VCR/IS
An ambulance version, the VCR/IS, which has provision for three stretchers (four in an emergency for quick transport) and a medic, heavy duty air conditioning system, water supply, a refrigerator, electric sterilizer, medical cupboards and a large tent that can be erected from the rear of the vehicle.

VCR/PC
A command post vehicle, the VCR/PC, with provisions for three radio operators, a long range transmitter and a short range transmitter, and four heavy duty storage batteries to provide power when the vehicle is stopped for long periods. There is also an electronic warfare vehicle based on the VCR/PC, fitted to customer requirements for intercepting and jamming enemy radio communications.

VCR/TT "Hydrojet"
This unique modification of the VCR/TT is a 4x4 variant produced for Argentina. The VCR/TT "Hydrojet" 4x4 amphibious variant replaces the center wheel stations with powerful waterjets, doubling the water speed over the standard 6X6 VCR-TT which relies on its wheels for water propulsion. The waterjets are placed in the center wheel position to protect them against obstacles in the water.

== Operators ==
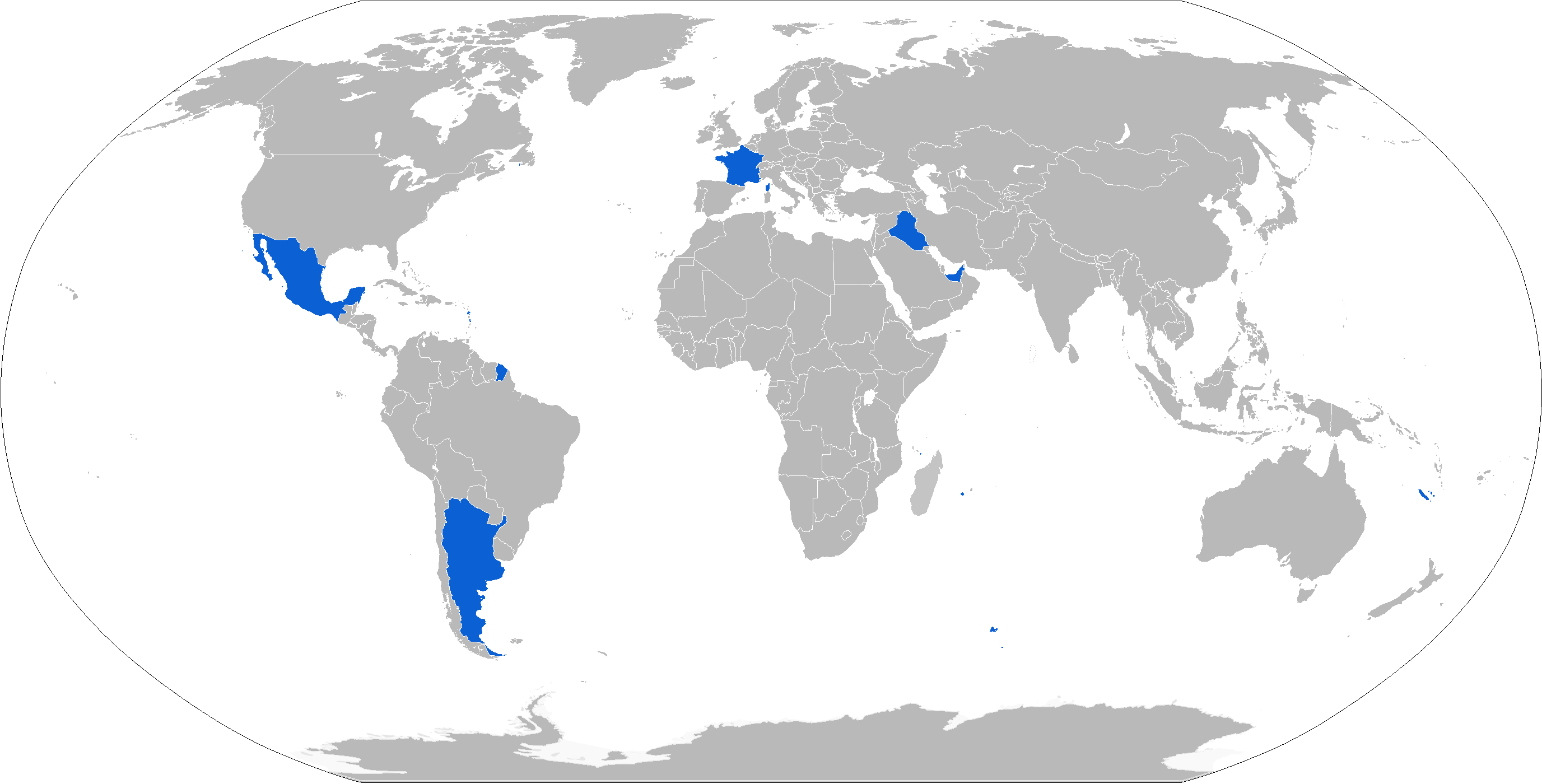
Map with Panhard VCR operators in blue

=== Current operators ===
- Argentina: 24
- Iraq: 100 VCR-TH delivered between 1979 and 1981, 44 a gift from UAE in 2005
- Mexico: 46
- United Arab Emirates: 82

== Gallery ==
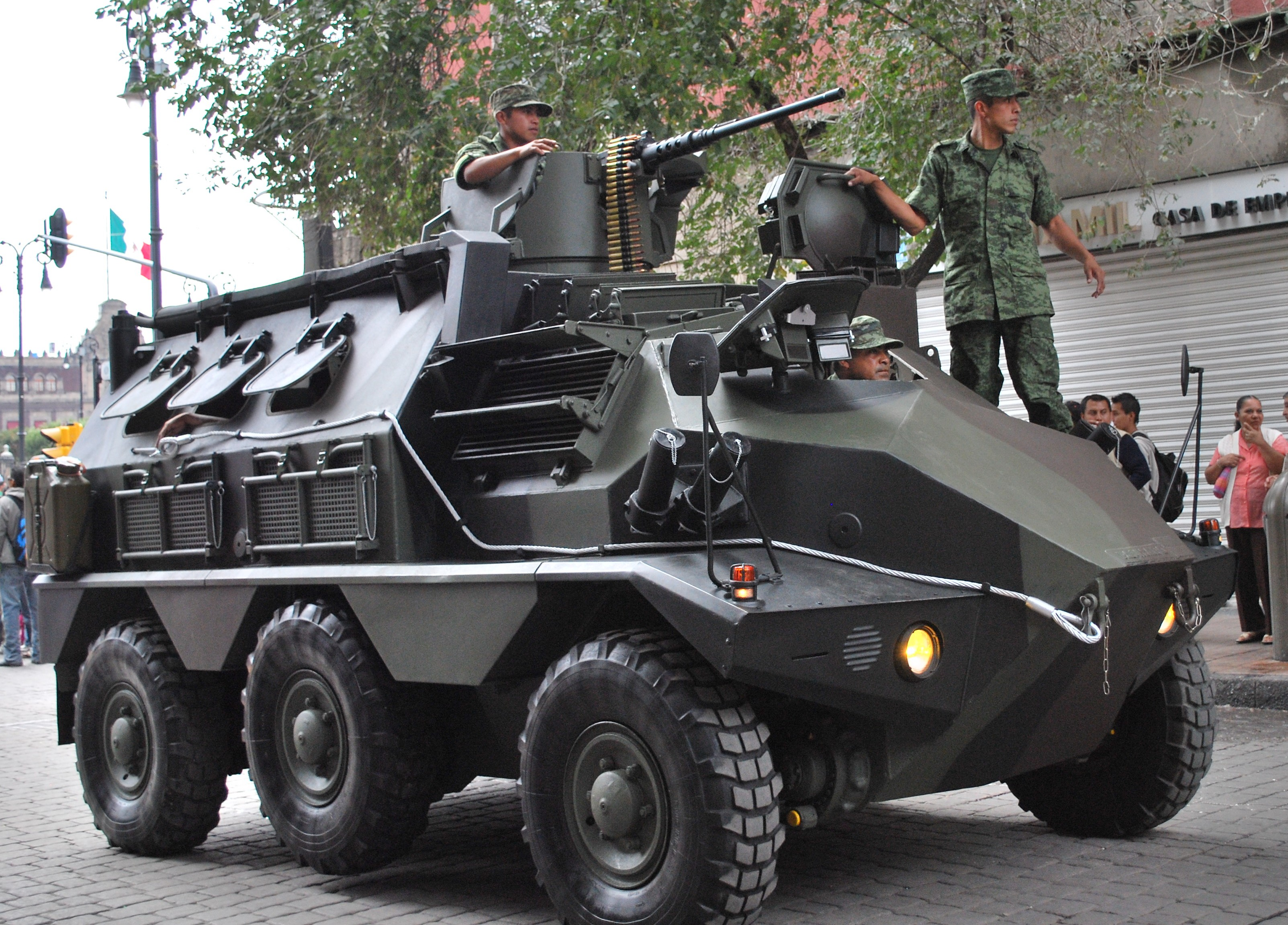
Panhard VCR TT 6x6

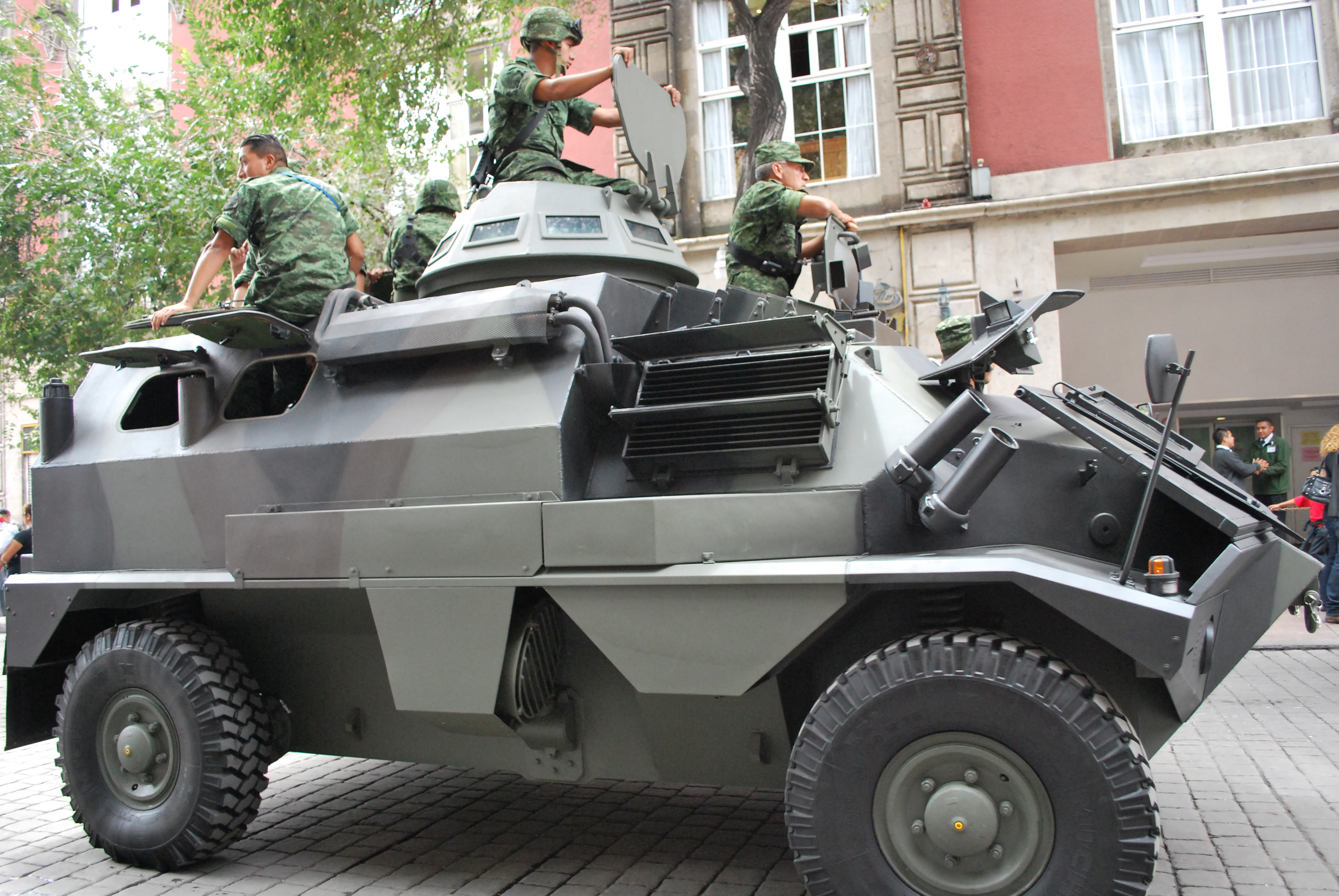
Panhard VCR TT 4x4

Schematics
