= Maxeen =

American rock band

- Origin: Long Beach, California, United States
- Genres: Pop-punk; alternative rock
- Years active: 2003–2008
- Labels: Side One Dummy; Warner Bros.
- Past members: Tom Bailey; Robb Torres; Shannon McMurray; Jay Skowronek

Maxeen was an American pop-punk band based in Long Beach, California, United States. Signed to SideOneDummy Records in 2003, Maxeen released their debut eponymous album which was on an enhanced CD containing a photo slideshow with images by Leah Klinge and Jay Matsueda. In 2004, they signed to Warner Bros. Records and recorded their next album, Hello Echo, though it was never distributed and was instead only sold on tour and through online stores such as iTunes. Due to conflicts over the release of Hello Echo, Maxeen severed its contract with Warner Bros. Records in early 2007.

The members of Maxeen cite influences from early U2, The Police, Joe Jackson, The Replacements, The Jam, and many other purveyors of classic pop-rock music. The band's name is a tribute to the woman who helped get them going and inspired them to make something of their music.

Maxeen has toured with Relient K and the Rocket Summer on the Matt Hoopes Birthday Tour in February 2006, as well as Jonezetta, Action Action, and We Are the Fury. The Los Angeles-based Sugarcult has asked Maxeen to tour with them several times.

Maxeen's self-titled debut album was released in 2003; Hello Echo (Tour Edition) was released in September 2006. Several of their songs are on video game soundtracks: "Please" is on Burnout 3: Takedown and MVP Baseball 2004, "Block Out the World" is on the soundtrack to Burnout Dominator and Burnout Paradise, and "Loud as War" is featured in MLB 07: The Show.

In its final form Maxeen consisted of Tom Bailey (vocals/bass), Robb Torres (guitar) and Jay Skowronek (drums). Shannon McMurray, the original guitarist and founding member, left the band in 2006 to pursue other career goals. On March 13, 2008, through a bulletin posting on Maxeen's MySpace profile, drummer Jay Skowronek officially announced that he had left the band. The band dissolved shortly after this announcement.

== Discography ==
=== Albums ===
- Save Your Life (live EP) (2003)
- Maxeen (2003)
- Hello Echo (Tour Edition) (2006)
- Life in the Gears (digital EP) (2007)
