= Light the Horizon =

Studio album by Bedouin Soundclash
- Released: September 28, 2010
- Genre: Reggae, Ska
- Length: 39:35
- Label: Pirates Blend; Sony Music Distribution
- Producer: King Britt

Bedouin Soundclash chronology
Street Gospels (2007)	Light the Horizon (2010)

Professional ratings
Review scores
Source	Rating
CHARTattack	4/5 stars
Slant Magazine	3/5 stars

Light the Horizon is the fourth LP by Canadian reggae/ska band Bedouin Soundclash. It was released on their own label, Pirates Blend, on September 28, 2010.

The song "Mountain Top" was the first single made available from the collection. The second single was "Elongo". On "Brutal Hearts", however, Malinowski had established a new duo with Coeur de pirate, called Armistice, who would release an EP in the next year.

== Track listing ==
All tracks written and composed by Bedouin Soundclash.

1. "Mountain Top" – 3:16
2. "Fools Tattoo" – 4:09
3. "May You Be the Road" – 3:04
4. "Brutal Hearts" (feat. Cœur de pirate) – 3:10
5. "Elongo" – 3:17
6. "No One Moves, No One Gets Hurt" – 2:41
7. "The Quick & The Dead" – 2:13
8. "Rolling Stone" – 3:22
9. "A Chance of Rain" – 4:14
10. "Follow the Sun" – 4:42
11. "Get It the Way You Want It" – 1:40 (iTunes Bonus Track)
12. "On My Block" – 3:47 (iTunes Pre-Order Only Bonus Track)

== Singles ==
- "Mountain Top"
- "Elongo"
- "A Chance of Rain"

== Credits ==
=== Bedouin Soundclash ===
- Jay Malinowski – vocals, guitar; lyrics
- Eon Sinclair – bass
- Sekou Lumumba – drums

=== Engineer, mixer ===
- Jeff Chestek

=== Mastering ===
- Phil Demetro
- Ted Jensen
