= Root Fire =

Studio album by Bedouin Soundclash
- Released: November 16, 2001
- Recorded: May 2001
- Studio: Rainy Day Studios
- Genre: Rock, reggae
- Length: 40:46
- Label: Independent
- Producer: Bedouin Soundclash

Bedouin Soundclash chronology
Root Fire (2001)	Sounding a Mosaic (2004)

Professional ratings
Review scores
Source	Rating
Allmusic	3/5 stars

Root Fire is the debut album from the Canadian rock band Bedouin Soundclash, made while the members of the band were still in school at Queen's University.

== Track listing ==
All songs were written by Bedouin Soundclash.

1. "Rodigan State Address" – 0:52
2. "Rebel Rouser" – 6:44
3. "Dub in the Kalemegdan" – 4:06
4. "Johnny Go to New York" – 5:08
5. "Back to the Matter" – 2:34
6. "Eloween Deowen" – 6:12
7. "Santa Monica" – 4:20
8. "Mandrake Root" – 3:49
9. "Natural Right (Rude Bwoy)" – 2:57
10. "National Water" – 4:04

== Personnel ==
- Jay Malinowski: vocals and guitar
- Eon Sinclair: Bass guitar
- Brett Dunlop: percussion
- Pat Pengelly: drums
- Rob Bailey: Bongo and maracas

== Credits ==
- All songs written by Bedouin Soundclash
- Album recorded at Rainy Day Studios, May 2001
- Cover art and design by Jay Malinowski
