= When the Night Feels My Song =

Single by Bedouin Soundclash

from the album Sounding a Mosaic
- Released: 2004
- Genre: Alternative rock; reggae; soft rock
- Label: Pirate's Blend
- Songwriters: Jay Malinowski; Eon Sinclair; Pat Pengelly
- Producer: Darryl Jenifer

Bedouin Soundclash singles chronology
"When the Night Feels My Song" (2004)	"Shelter" (2005)

Music video
- "When the Night Feels My Song" on YouTube

"When the Night Feels My Song" is a song by Canadian alternative rock group Bedouin Soundclash released in 2004 as the lead single from their debut album Sounding a Mosaic. It features a reggae/soft rock sound.

When this song was first released in the UK in 2005, it reached number 24 in the charts. However, the song was later used as part of a T-Mobile advertising campaign and was re-released in October 2006. From 2007 to 2013, it was also used in the bumpers and credits of Kids' CBC, the children's block of CBC Television.

== Music video ==
The music video shows the band on various streets during the night, in Toronto, Ontario, Canada. The streets were not closed for the video, so anyone seen in the video was not cast, and just happened to walk by during filming. The video reached #1 on the MuchMusic Countdown charts in November 2005, after entering the chart in September of that year.

== "...Fills My Soul" ==
On the album, NME Presents The Essential Bands released in November 2005, the track was listed as "When the Night Fills My Soul". The song is still referred to by this name in some places. Officially, Bedouin's own website, band record sales and iTunes all refer to the track as "...Feels My Song". The NME apparent misprint appears to be the source of this misunderstanding.

== Certifications ==
Region	Certification	Certified units/sales
Canada (Music Canada)	Platinum	80,000^{‡}
^{‡} Sales+streaming figures based on certification alone.
