= Canadian Musician =

Canadian magazine

- Editor: Matt Bauer
- Categories: Music magazine
- Frequency: Bi-monthly
- Founder: Jim Norris
- Founded: 1979; 47 years ago
- First issue: March/April 1979
- Company: Norris-Whitney Communications Inc.
- Country: Canada
- Based in: Niagara Falls, Ontario
- Language: English
- Website: https://www.canadianmusician.com/

Canadian Musician was a Canadian magazine that was published bi-monthly by Norris-Whitney Communications Inc. The magazine closed in 2023.

== History and profile ==
Canadian Musician was launched by Jim Norris in Toronto in 1979. The premier issue was published in March/April 1979. The magazine's primary area of interest was to profile Canadian musicians and musical events. The magazine also wrote articles on the Canadian music business and featured articles on musical equipment and technology. The magazine covered a broad spectrum of artists from a variety of musical genres. It was distributed internationally through subscription and across music and record stores and newsstands in Canada.

In 1991 the circulation of Canadian Musician was about 27,001 copies.
