= Bedouin Soundclash =

Canadian band

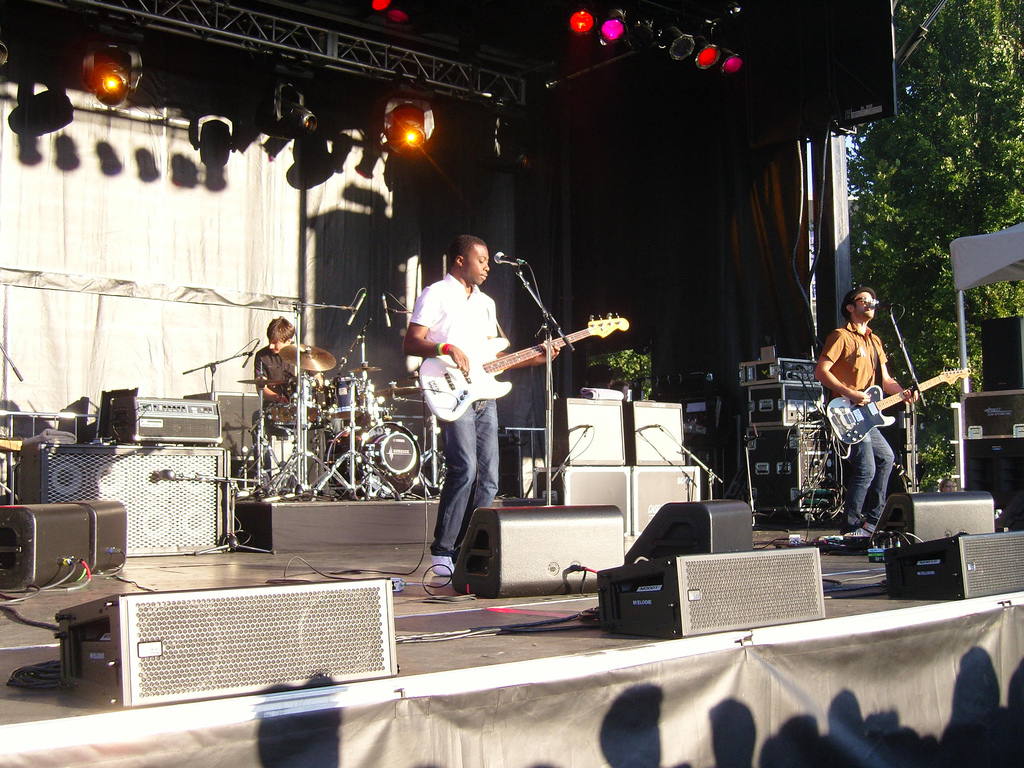
- Bedouin Soundclash performing in 2007

Background information
- Origin: Kingston, Ontario, Canada
- Genres: Alternative rock; ska; roots reggae; reggae rock; pop
- Years active: 2000–present
- Labels: Pirates Blend; Dine Alone; Stomp; SideOneDummy; Easy Star
- Members: Jay Malinowski; Eon Sinclair; Chuck Treece
- Past members: Pat Pengelly; Sekou Lumumba; Vincent Spilchuk
- Website: bedouinsoundclash.com

Bedouin Soundclash is a Canadian band based in Toronto and consisting of vocalist and guitarist Jay Malinowski, bass player Eon Sinclair, and various session musicians. Their sound has been described as a combination of reggae and ska. Bedouin Soundclash was formed in 2001 and has released six studio albums, most recently in 2022.

== History ==
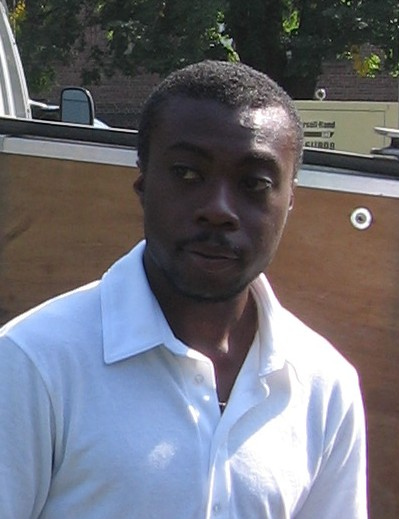
Eon Sinclair in September 2006

The band members met while attending Queen's University in Kingston, Ontario. The name Bedouin Soundclash is from a dub record by Badawi, released on ROIR records in 1996.

They released their first album, Root Fire in 2001, and their second album, Sounding a Mosaic, in 2004. During the recording of Sounding a Mosaic, Bedouin Soundclash formed a close bond with producer Darryl Jenifer of Bad Brains, with whom they continue to work today.

The album's single "When the Night Feels My Song" was the band's breakthrough single on Canadian radio, charting at No. 1 on 102.1 The Edge CFNY and gaining airplay on commercial radio stations throughout Canada in the summer of 2005. It was the No. 2 most played track on Canadian Radio, competing with Nickelback's "Photograph" and Green Day's "Wake Me Up When September Ends". The song was used in a commercial for Zellers, and was the theme for Kids' CBC from 2007 to 2013. It was used in a 2006 T-Mobile ad in the UK, and in the Teton Gravity Research ski film, Anomaly.

=== 2005–2006 ===
In 2005, Bedouin Soundclash appeared on the Vans Warped Tour, then embarked on a 31-date tour of Canada. They had significant chart success in the UK, where Sounding a Mosaic reached No. 1 on the BBC 6 Music charts; the single "When the Night Feels My Song" spent 21 weeks in the Top 40 and peaked at No. 24.

In 2006, they toured the UK with reggae legend Vernon Buckley from the 1970s reggae duo The Maytones. They also played with a variety of performers including Ben Harper, Damian Marley, The Skatalites, Burning Spear and The Junction, among others, and embarked on a sold-out tour (37 dates) across Canada, then another UK tour.

Malinowski was ill during the band's concert at the Leeds Festival in 2006. The set finished with "When the Night Feels My Song", which was sung entirely by the crowd, and once the band had left the stage, sung again by the crowd as a "thank you" to Jay for singing when he was unwell. The band came back on to listen, then Jay invited everyone to come see them again when they come back to Britain in the autumn, saying "We owe you one."

They were the main performance at the September 17, 2006 Toronto rally calling for Canadian intervention in the Darfur crisis.

Also in 2006, the band founded its own imprint, Pirates Blend, to release their own side projects and b-sides, and sign other artists.

At the Juno Awards of 2006, Bedouin Soundclash won the award for New Group of the Year; "When the Night Feels My Song" was nominated for Song of the Year. The band also performed at the gala ceremony.

=== 2007–2009 ===
Bedouin Soundclash released their follow-up record Street Gospels on August 21, 2007. Their single "St. Andrews" became a No. 1 on major market rock station Edge 102's Top 30 Countdown. The song "12:59 Lullaby" was featured in an episode of Grey's Anatomy, "Where the Boys Are" (Season 3, seventh episode). The band appeared on the September/October 2007 cover of Canadian Musician magazine. In June 2007 they co-headlined Rogers Picnic with The Roots and Bad Brains.

On September 10, 2007, they played at Wilfrid Laurier University's Turret Nightclub. The crowd repeatedly asked the band to play "Santa Monica" off the Root Fire album. Despite the band's annoyance, and referring to the audience as "rude" to be yelling out requests, they played it as an encore, stating that it would most likely be the last time they ever played it live. They have yet to play it again, although Jay played a solo acoustic version at a Vancouver benefit concert for Insite on December 6, 2008, and at the 102.1 The Edge Casby Awards on October 22, 2009.

The band also performed at the 2007 V Festival in Chelmsford, Great Britain. They played several songs, including "When the Night Feels My Song" in the "Virgin Mobile Union" area. That year their video for "Walls Fall Down" jumped to No. 1 on MuchMusic countdown.

At the Juno Awards of 2008, Bedouin Soundclash received two nominations: the video for "Walls Fall Down" for Video of the Year, Street Gospels for Pop Album of the Year.

They performed Japan's Summer Sonic Festival in 2008, with Coldplay, Alicia Keys and The Verve.

In 2009, Bedouin Soundclash tour with Paramore as the opening act for Grammy Award-winning artists No Doubt's 2009 Summer Tour. They also went to do multiple performances at the 2009 Australian Soundwave Festival.

On March 6, 2009, the band premiered their new music video for the song "Hearts in the Night" on the website of the David Suzuki Foundation. In August 2009, they were chosen as the Headliner at Roots and Blues Festival in Salmon Arm, British Columbia.

Also this year, the band signed to Dine Alone Records and released the EP Where Have All The Songs Played Gone To?.

On January 7, 2009, drummer Pat Pengelly announced that he would be leaving Bedouin Soundclash to attend Queen's University Law School. He was admitted to the Ontario Bar in 2013.

=== 2010 ===
In January 2010, the band and their management officially launched their label, Pirates Blend Records, with a distribution deal with Sony Music Canada. Their first official release was Jay Malinowski's solo effort "Bright Lights and Bruises".

In February 2010, Sekou Lumumba became the official drummer of the band, starting off by joining them in Vancouver for the 2010 Winter Olympics performances. After the "Bright Lights and Bruises tour" with Michael Rault and Kinnie Starr, Pirates Blend Records announced that King Britt was confirmed to produce the next Bedouin Soundclash album at the studio of Larry Gold in Philadelphia. On June 18, the band headlined the 2010 Mississauga Waterfront Festival. In October, the band played Expo 2010 in Shanghai, China.

In July 2010, the band played at the Apple store in Montreal; the result was the digital album iTunes Live From Montreal. On September 28, 2010, the band released their fourth studio album, Light the Horizon, featuring the singles "Mountain Top", "Elongo" and "Brutal Hearts" featuring Cœur de pirate.

=== 2014–2017 ===
On May 10, 2014, the band's original line up reunited for a performance at the Horseshoe Tavern in Toronto. The show was a Cystic fibrosis fundraiser held in memory of the band's friend and agent, Paul Gourlie.

In 2016, the band started working on a new album in New Orleans with the Preservation Hall Jazz Band and King Britt as producer. By now, Lumumba had left the band and been replaced by drummer Chuck Treece. In 2017, the band released "Clock Work", their first single in seven years.

=== 2018 ===
In 2018, the band released six different singles: "Salt Water", "They Gutted This City", "When We're Gone", "Born Into Bad Times", "Drive", and "Holy". In 2019, they released the album Mass.

=== 2022–present ===
On June 2, 2022, they released their double single "Shine On" featuring Marcia Richards of the Skints and "Something Lost + Something Found."

Another single was released during June of 2026 alongside Bermudian reggae artist Collie Buddz called, "Bang-A-Lang". Later on that summer, they published a remix of the track with the artist J-Vibe titled, "Bang-A-Lang (J-Vibe Version)". Bedouin Soundclash then accompanied the band Mariachi El Bronx on a tour of the United States titled the, "You Ése Tour 2026".

On October 9th of 2026, Bedouin Soundclash released their third single of the year with the Spanish singer-songwriter Gizmo Varillas named, "Islands in the Fog".

== Discography ==
Albums

- Root Fire (2001), Independent
- Sounding a Mosaic (2004), Stomp Records
- Street Gospels (2007), Dine Alone Records
- Light the Horizon (2010), Pirates Blend Records
- iTunes Live From Montreal (2010), Pirates Blend Records
- Mass (2019), Mr Bongo, Easy Star Records
- We Will Meet in a Hurricane (2022), Dine Alone Records

EP

- Where Have All The Songs Played Gone To? (2009), Dine Alone Records

Singles

- "When the Night Feels My Song" / "Rude Boy Abroad" (2004)
- "New Year's Day" (2005)
- "12:59 Lullaby" / "One Way" (2006)
- "Walls Fall Down" / "Gunships" (2007)
- "St. Andrews" (2007)
- "Mountain Top" (2010)
- "Elongo" (2011)
- "Here I Am" (2011)
- "Brutal Hearts" (2014)
- "Clock Work" (2017)
- "Born Into Bad Times" (2018)
- "They Gutted This City" (2018)
- "Salt Water" (2018)
- "Holy" (2018)
- "When We're Gone" (2018)
- "Drive" (2018)
- "Shine On" / "Something Lost + Something Found" (2022)
- "Bang-A-Lang" (2026)
- "Bang-A-Lang [J-Vibe Version]" (2026)
- "Islands in the Fog" (2026)

Compilation appearances

- Juno Awards 2006 (2006), Sony BMG
- Juno Awards 08 (2008), Sony BMG

== See also ==
- Music of Canada
- Canadian rock
- List of bands from Canada
- List of Canadian musicians
