= SideOneDummy Records =

American independent record label

- Logo used from 1995 to 2016
- Founded: 1995
- Founder: Joe Sib, Bill Armstrong
- Distributor: AWAL
- Genre: Alternative rock, punk rock
- Country of origin: U.S.
- Location: Los Angeles, California
- Official website: sideonedummy.com

SideOneDummy Records is an independent record label based in Los Angeles. It was founded in 1995 by Bill Armstrong and Joe Sib. The label began as a way for them to release music for their friends' bands. Thereafter SideOneDummy launched the careers of bands like The Gaslight Anthem, AJJ, Flogging Molly, Gogol Bordello, Title Fight and others. Since 1998, SideOneDummy Records has also released the annual Warped Tour compilation album, which features music by bands playing on the current year's tour. Their YouTube channel, which features artists in their current roster, has 116,000 subscribers and 170,015,900 views (as of February 27, 2025).

== Roster ==
- AJJ
- Astronautalis
- Chris Shiflett
- Cliffdiver
- Iron Chic
- Joe Sib
- John-Allison Weiss
- Kerosene Heights
- Meat Wave
- Nahko and Medicine for the People
- Paerish
- Pkew pkew pkew
- Plasma Canvas
- Rozwell Kid
- Safe to Say
- Semantics
- Summerbruise
- Timeshares
- Worriers

== Former ==
- 7 Seconds
- Anti-Flag
- Audra Mae
- Avoid One Thing
- Bedouin Soundclash
- Big D and the Kids Table
- Broadway Calls
- Chris Farren
- Chuck Ragan
- Egghead.
- Fake Problems
- Flogging Molly
- Gogol Bordello
- Goldfinger
- Jeff Rosenstock
- Kill Your Idols
- Madcap
- Maxeen
- Microwave
- MxPx
- PUP
- Piebald
- Slick Shoes
- Superheaven
- The Black Pacific
- The Bouncing Souls
- The Briggs
- The Casualties
- The Dan Band
- The Gaslight Anthem
- The Mighty Mighty Bosstones
- The Reverend Peyton's Big Damn Band
- The Sounds
- The Suicide Machines
- Swingin' Utters
- Title Fight
- VCR
- Violent Soho
- ZOX
