= Athabasca =

Athabasca (also Athabaska) is an anglicized version of the Cree name for Lake Athabasca in Canada, āthap-āsk-ā-w (pronounced [aːθapaːskaːw]), meaning "grass or reeds here and there". Most places named Athabasca are found in Alberta, Canada.

Athabasca may also refer to:

== Geographical features ==
- Mount Athabasca (3,491 m or 11,453 ft), a mountain in Jasper National Park, Canada
  - Athabasca Glacier, a glacier in Jasper National Park, Canada
- Athabasca River, river in Alberta, Canada
  - Athabasca Falls, waterfalls on the Athabasca River
  - Peace-Athabasca Delta – of the Peace River, Athabasca River, near Lake Athabasca
- Athabasca Oil Sands – oil-producing region in Alberta, Canada
- Lake Athabasca, large lake in Alberta and Saskatchewan, Canada
- Athabasca Pass, a mountain pass in Jasper National Park
- Athabasca Valles, a feature on the surface of the planet Mars
- Athabasca Sand Dunes Provincial Park, a unique geophysical land feature in the boreal shield ecosystem Saskatchewan, Canada
- Athabasca Basin, a region in Northern Saskatchewan and Alberta, the source of the world's highest grade uranium deposits

== Administrative features ==
- Athabasca, Alberta, town in Canada, formerly (1880–1914) named Athabasca Landing
- Athabasca County, a municipal district in Alberta, Canada
- District of Athabasca, a former district of the North-West Territory
- Athabaska (electoral district), a former federal electoral district (1925–1968) in Alberta
- Athabasca (electoral district), a federal electoral district (since 1968) in Alberta
- Athabasca (Alberta provincial electoral district), 1905–1986
- Athabasca (Saskatchewan provincial electoral district)
- Athabasca University, a distance learning university in Athabasca, Alberta, Canada

== Other ==
- Athabaskan languages, a language family indigenous to North America
- Athabaska Herald, one of the officers of arms at the Canadian Heraldic Authority
- Athabasca (novel), novel by Alistair MacLean
- Athabasca, a character in Terry Brooks's Shannara series
- SS Athabasca, a steamship launched in Scotland in 1883 and put into service on the Great Lakes, along with SS Alberta and SS Algoma
- Any of three ships named HMCS Athabaskan
- Athabasca (1888 HBC vessel), a steampowered sternwheel riverboat, operated by the Hudson's Bay Company
- Athabasca River (1912 HBC vessel), see Boats of the Mackenzie River watershed
- Athabasca River (1922 HBC vessel), see Boats of the Mackenzie River watershed
- MS Fort Athabasca, a Canadian-owned, British-registered merchant ship bombed 2 December 1943 during World War II
- Athabascaite, a mineral
- Athabaska Airways, earlier name of Transwest Air
- Athabasca Valles, a channel on the planet Mars

== See also ==
- Arthabaska (disambiguation), the name of several geographic features in Quebec, shares the same root
