= Stutfield Peak =

Mountain peak in Jasper NP, Alberta, Canada

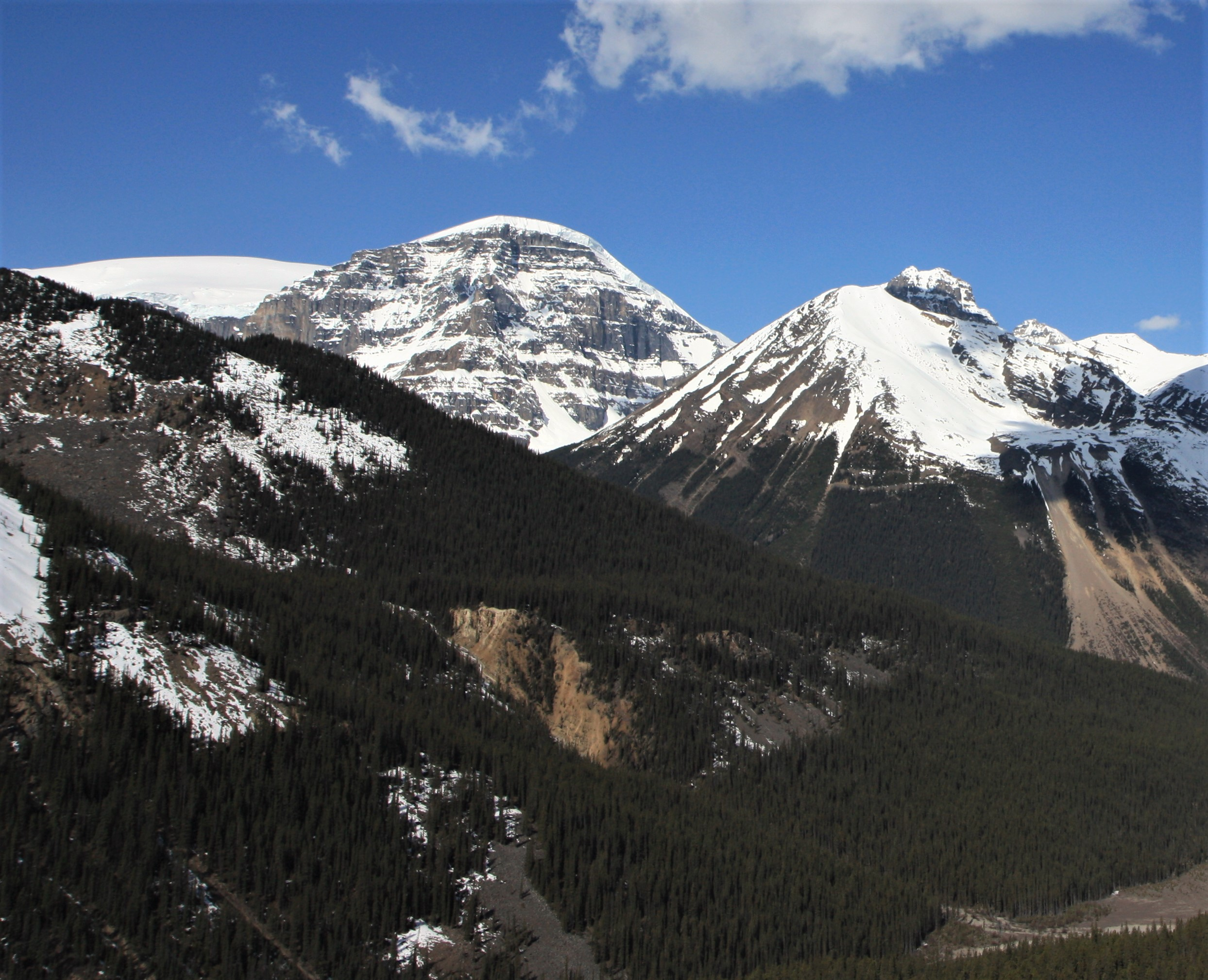
- Stutfield's East Peak seen from the Skywalk area

Highest point
- Elevation: 3,450 m (11,320 ft)
- Prominence: 290 m (950 ft)
- Parent peak: North Twin Peak (3730 m)
- Listing: Mountains of Alberta
- Coordinates: 52°14′18″N 117°24′27″W

Geography
- Location within Alberta
- Country: Canada
- Province: Alberta
- Parent range: Winston Churchill Range
- Topo map: NTS 83C3 Columbia Icefield

Climbing
- First ascent: 1927 by Alfred J. Ostheimer, guided by Hans Fuhrer
- Easiest route: rock/snow climb

Stutfield Peak is a mountain in Jasper National Park, Alberta, Canada. It is located at the northern end of the Columbia Icefield, 6 kilometres (3.7 mi) north-west from Mount Kitchener, in the Winston Churchill Range of the Canadian Rockies. The peak has two summits - Stutfield East and Stutfield West - and is therefore sometimes referred to as The Stutfields. The West peak is higher than the East peak by 50 m (164 ft).

In 1899, mountaineer J. Norman Collie named the mountain after Hugh Stutfield, who climbed with Collie during his exploration of the Canadian Rockies.

Stufield Glacier was also named after Hugh Stutfield, and flows southeast from the peak, in the Columbia Icefield.

== Climate ==
Based on the Köppen climate classification, it is located in a subarctic climate with cold, snowy winters, and mild summers. Temperatures can drop below −20 °C (−4 °F) with wind chill factors below −30 °C (−22 °F).

== Gallery ==
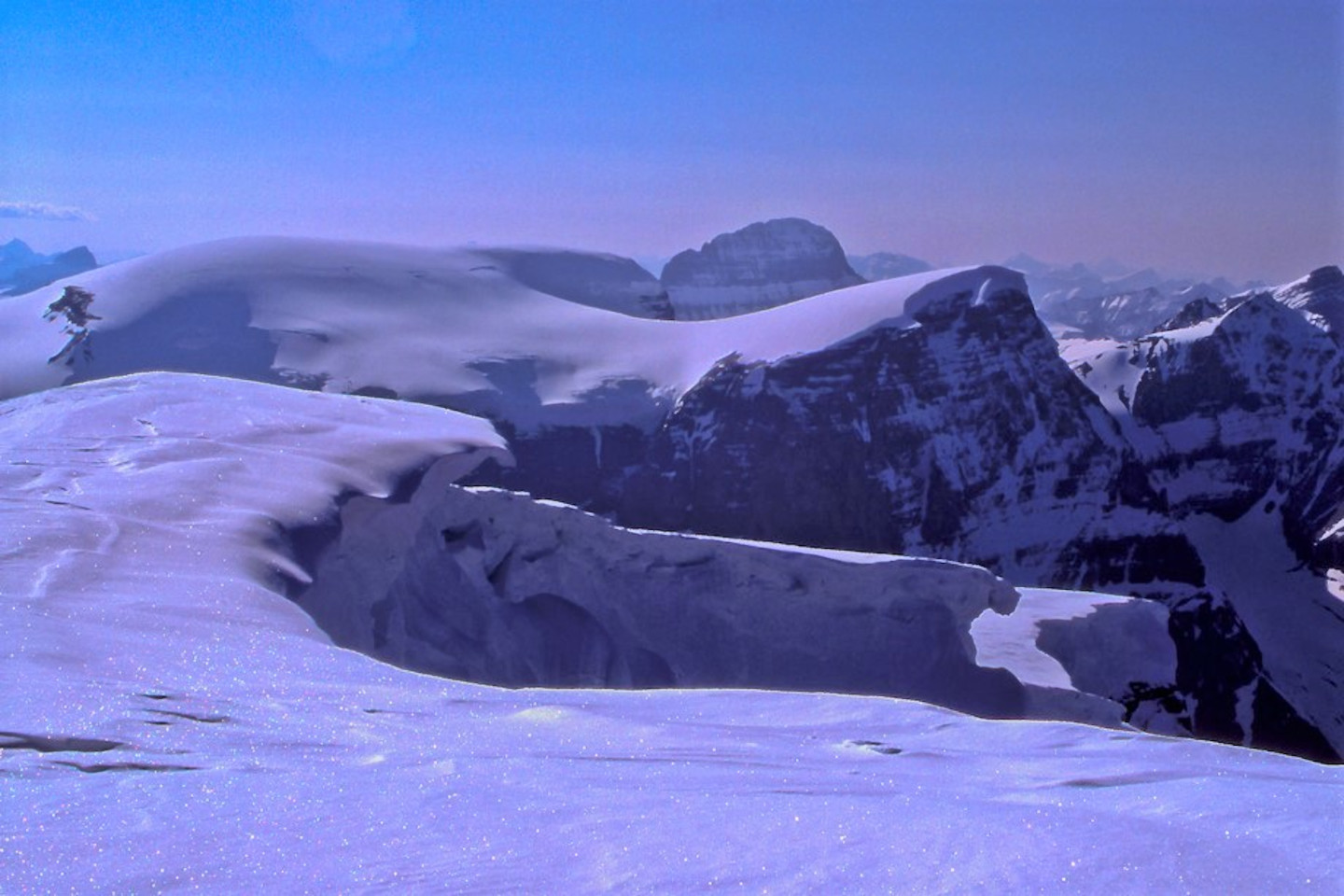
The Stutfields (W & E); Mount Alberta at back

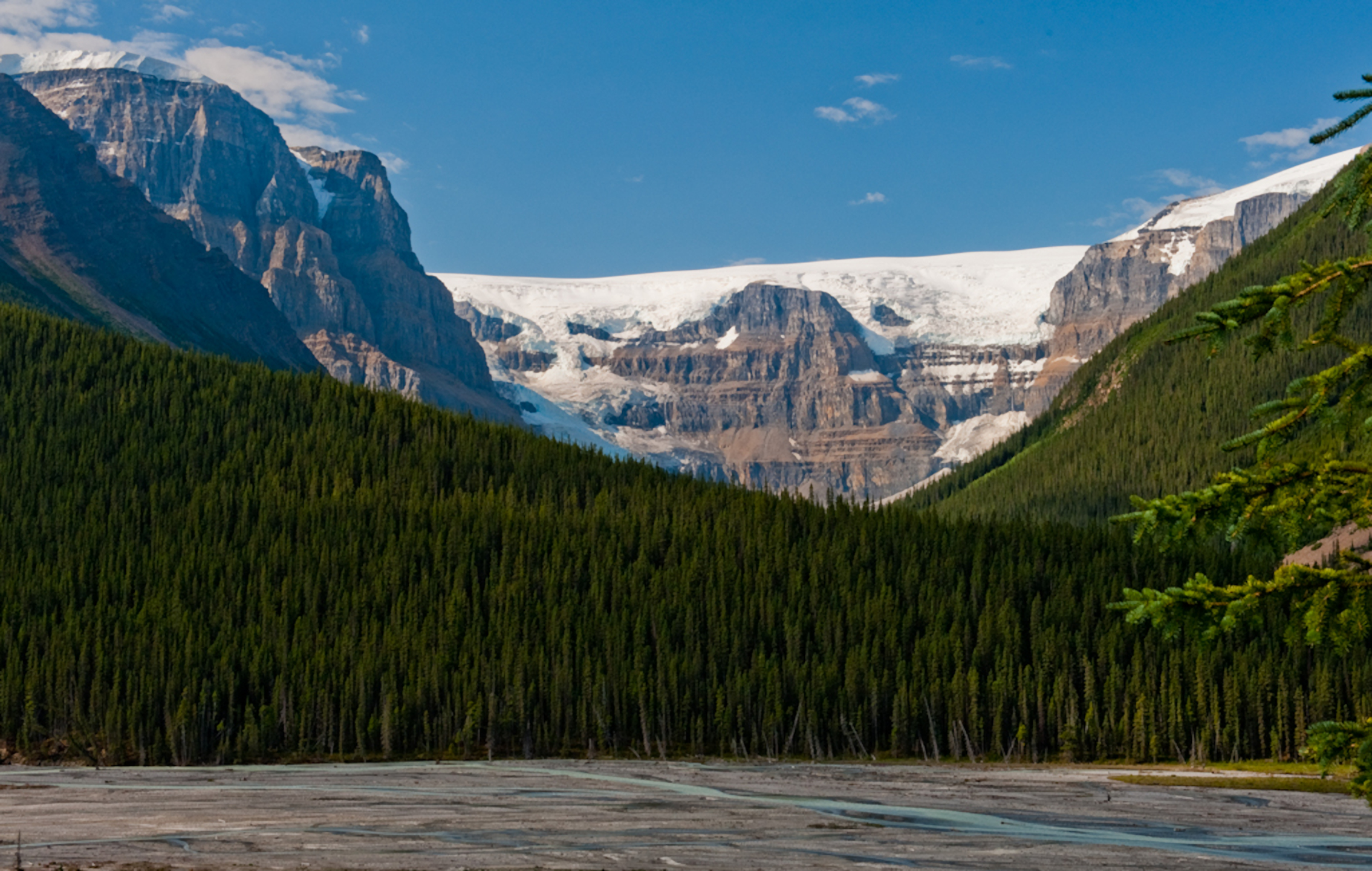
Stutfield Glacier from Icefields Parkway Viewpoint

== See also ==
- List of mountains in the Canadian Rockies
- List of mountains of Canada
