= Mount Andromeda (Alberta) =

Mountain in Alberta, Canada

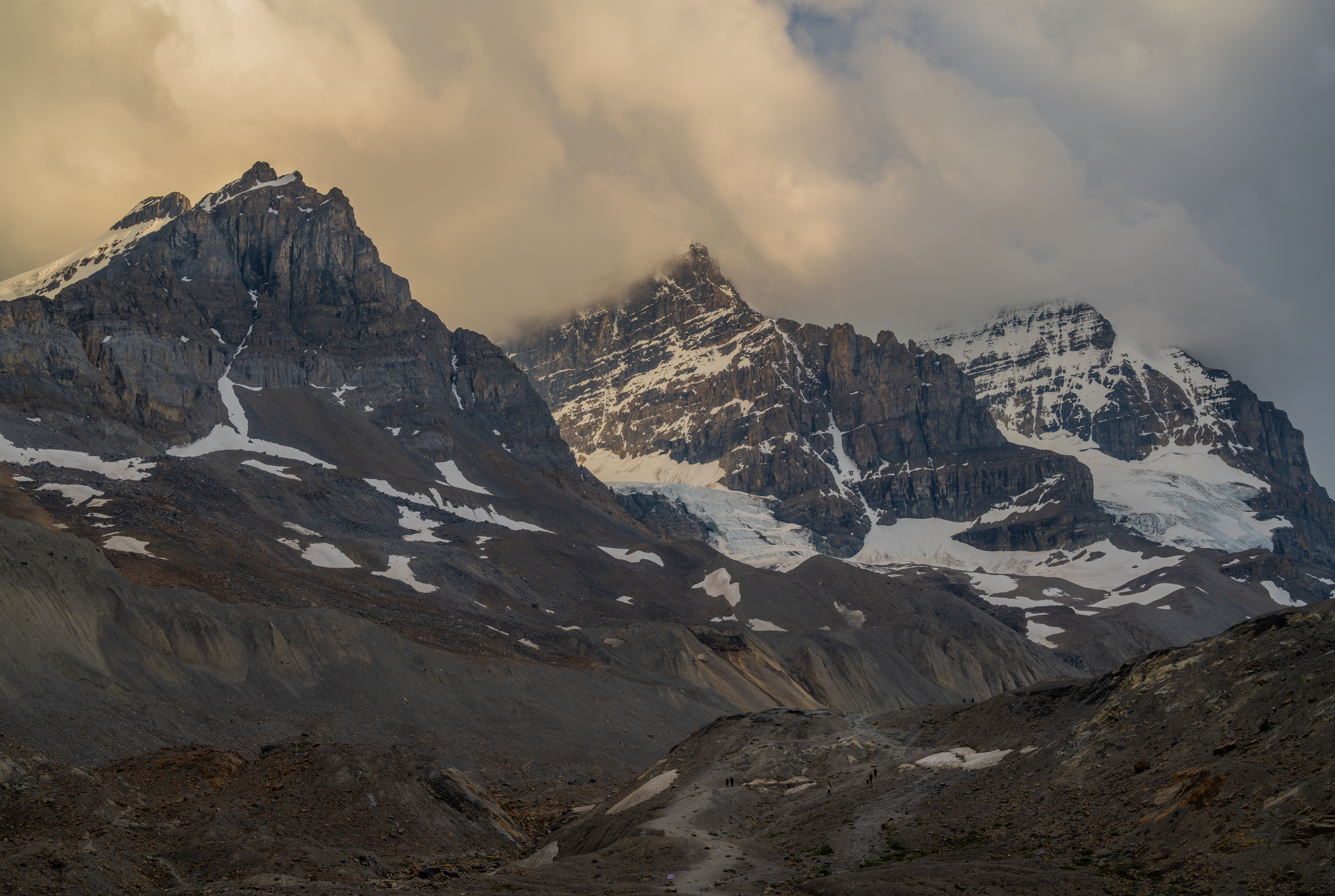
- Mt. Andromeda as seen from the Athabasca Glacier

Highest point
- Elevation: 3,450 m (11,320 ft)
- Prominence: 330 m (1,080 ft)
- Parent peak: Mount Athabasca (3491 m)
- Listing: Mountains of Alberta
- Coordinates: 52°10′26″N 117°14′10″W

Geography
- Location within Alberta
- Location: Alberta, Canada
- Parent range: Park Ranges
- Topo map: NTS 83C3 Columbia Icefield

Climbing
- First ascent: 1930 by W.R. Hainsworth, J.F. Lehmann, M.M. Strumia
- Easiest route: rock/glacier/snow climb

Mount Andromeda is located within the Columbia Icefield on the boundary of Banff and Jasper national parks. The mountain can be seen from the Icefields Parkway (#93) near Sunwapta Pass and is 2.3 km WSW of Mount Athabasca. Mt. Andromeda was named in 1938 by Rex Gibson, former president of the Alpine Club of Canada, after Andromeda, the wife of Perseus.
From the Climber's Guide:

"A deservedly popular peak, well seen and easily accessible from the Icefields campground via the road to the snowmobile parking lot."

== Routes ==
There are several mountaineering and climbing routes on Andromeda. The Skyladder is the normal and very popular glacier route.
