= Castleguard Mountain =

Mountain in Alberta, Canada

- Mount Castleguard
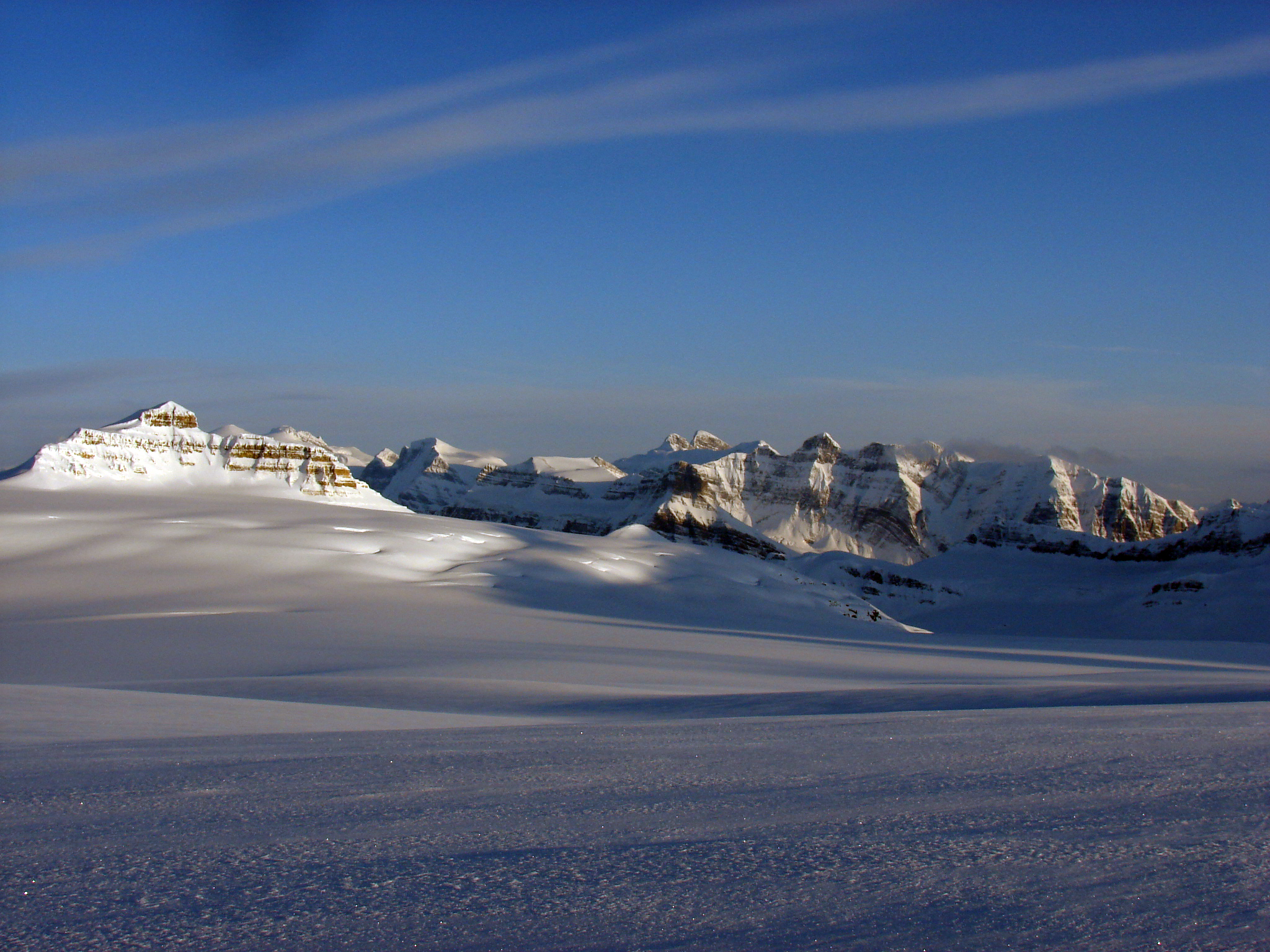
- Mount Castleguard (on the left)

Highest point
- Elevation: 3,083 m (10,115 ft)
- Prominence: 443 m (1,453 ft)
- Parent peak: Mount Andromeda (3450 m)
- Listing: Mountains of Alberta
- Coordinates: 52°06′35″N 117°15′14″W

Geography
- Location within Alberta Location within Canada
- Interactive map of Castleguard Mountain
- Location: Alberta, Canada
- Parent range: Canadian Rockies
- Topo map: NTS 83C3 Columbia Icefield

Climbing
- First ascent: 1919 by the Interprovincial Boundary Commission

Castleguard Mountain, also known as Mount Castleguard, is an isolated mountain located near the southern edge of the Columbia Icefield at the northern edge of Banff National Park in Alberta, Canada. In 1918, Irish land surveyor Arthur Oliver Wheeler named the mountain because of its castle-like appearance, which seemed to stand guard over the southern portion of the Columbia Icefield. Castleguard was first ascended in 1919 by the Interprovincial Boundary Commission, which determined the exact location of the boundary between British Columbia and Alberta along the continental divide.

Author Lewis Freeman, in his 1925 book Roof of the Rockies, described the view from the summit:

Possibly lacking the sheer breath-taking wonder of the first sight of Kinchinjunga's snows from Darjeeling, the view from the summit of Castleguard is still one of the great mountain panoramas of the world. Set on the southern rim of the Columbia Icefields, with no other peak encroaching on its domain for many miles, there are no masking barriers close at hand to cut off the view in any direction. Not only are almost all the great peaks of the Canadian Rockies system notched into the splendid panorama, but also many of those of the Selkirk and Gold Ranges, far beyond the purple-shadowed depths that mark the great gorge of the Columbia River.

== Geology ==
Castleguard is composed of sedimentary rock laid down during the Precambrian to Jurassic periods. Formed in shallow seas, this sedimentary rock was pushed east and over the top of younger rock during the Laramide orogeny.

== Climate ==
Based on the Köppen climate classification, Castleguard is located in a subarctic climate with cold, snowy winters, and mild summers. Temperatures can drop below −20 °C (−4 °F) with wind chill factors below −30 °C (−22 °F).

== Gallery ==
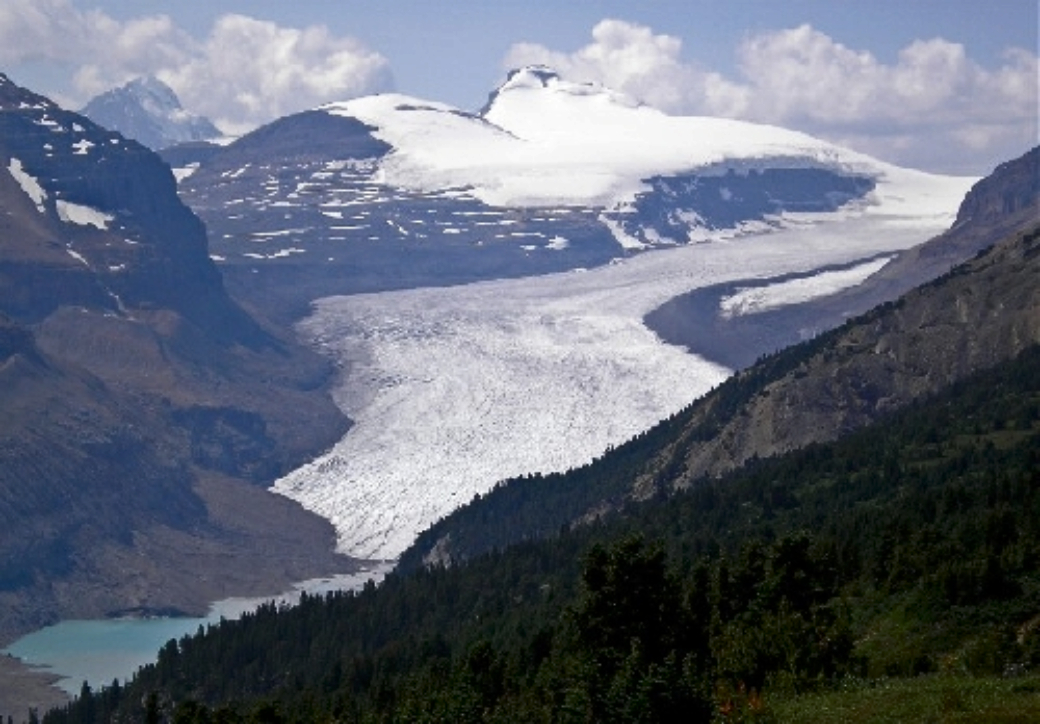
Castleguard and Saskatchewan Glacier seen from Parker Ridge

== See also ==
- Castleguard Cave, an extensively studied cave underneath the mountain
