= Columbia Icefield =

Ice field in the Canadian Rockies

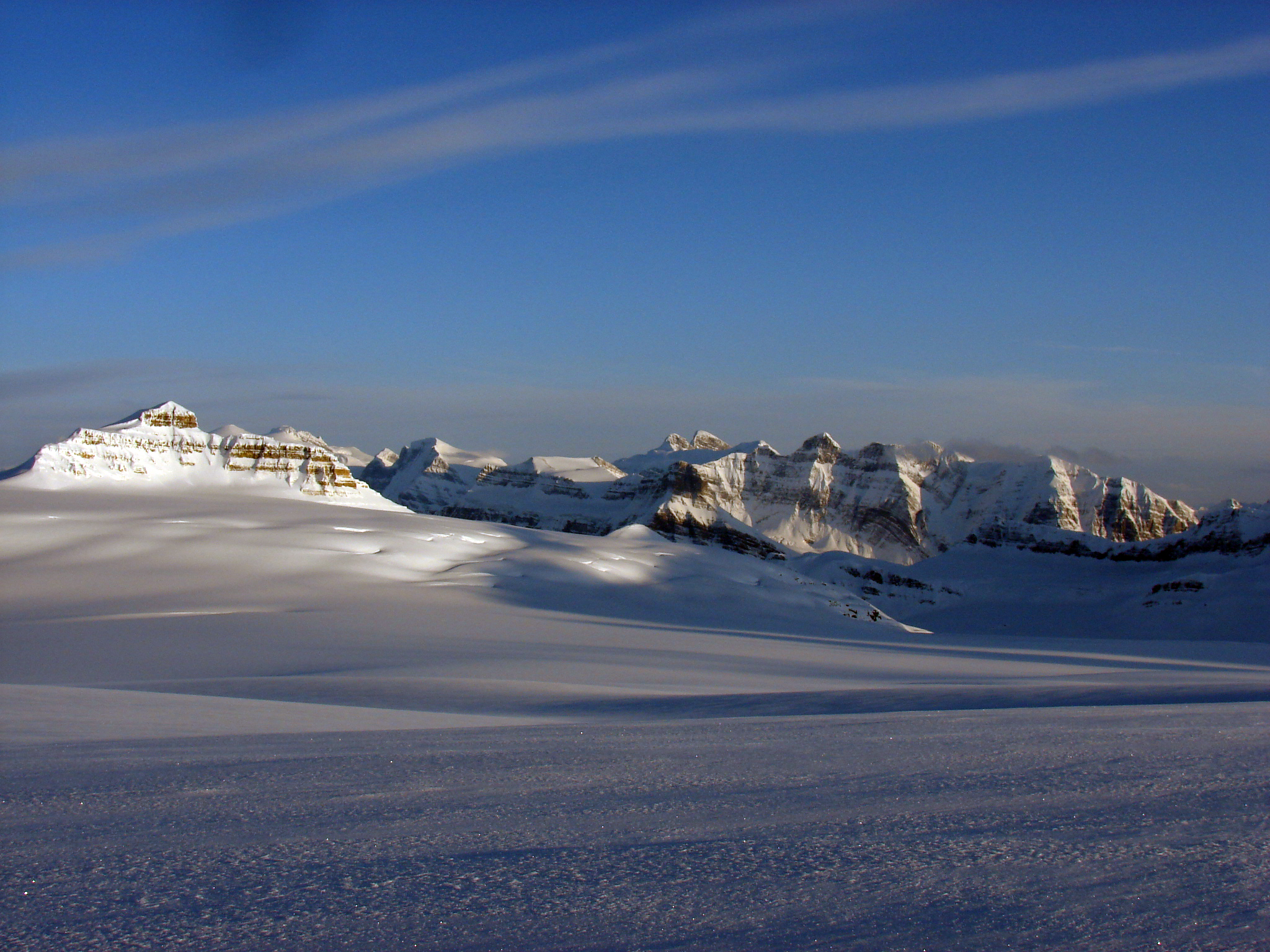
- Columbia Icefield with Mt. Castleguard at the left.

- Location within Alberta Location within British Columbia Location within Canada
- Interactive map of Columbia Icefield
- Type: Icefield
- Coordinates: 52°09′26″N 117°18′50″W
- Terminus: outflow glaciers

The Columbia Icefield is the largest ice field in North America's Rocky Mountains. Located within the Canadian Rocky Mountains astride the Continental Divide along the border of British Columbia and Alberta, Canada, the ice field lies partly in the northwestern tip of Banff National Park and partly in the southern end of Jasper National Park. It is about 325 square kilometres (125 mi^{2}) in area, 100 to 365 metres (328 to 1,198 ft) in depth and receives up to 7 metres (280 in) of snowfall per year.

== Geology ==
The Columbia Icefield sits on a large area of relatively horizontal layers of rock. Because flat-lying layers erode more slowly than the surrounding tilted areas, the surface remains higher-altitude and therefore colder. The icefield was formed during the Great Glaciation, or Illinoian period (238,000 to 126,000 BCE). The initial advancement of the ice field ended during the latter millennia of the Early Wisconsinan period (73,000 to 62,000 BCE). The next major advance of the ice field occurred during the Late Wisconsinan period (18,000 to 9,000 BCE), which marked the end of the major intercontinental land mass bridges. During the Crowfoot Glacier advance (9,000 to 7,000 BCE), humans were beginning to learn farming along the Tigris, Euphrates, and Nile rivers. The last major period of advance occurred during the Little Ice Age, which lasted from about 1200 AD to 1900 AD. Around 1800, the Athabasca Glacier peaked, then went through a period of recession, and then advanced again until 1840, when it began receding until the present day.

== History ==
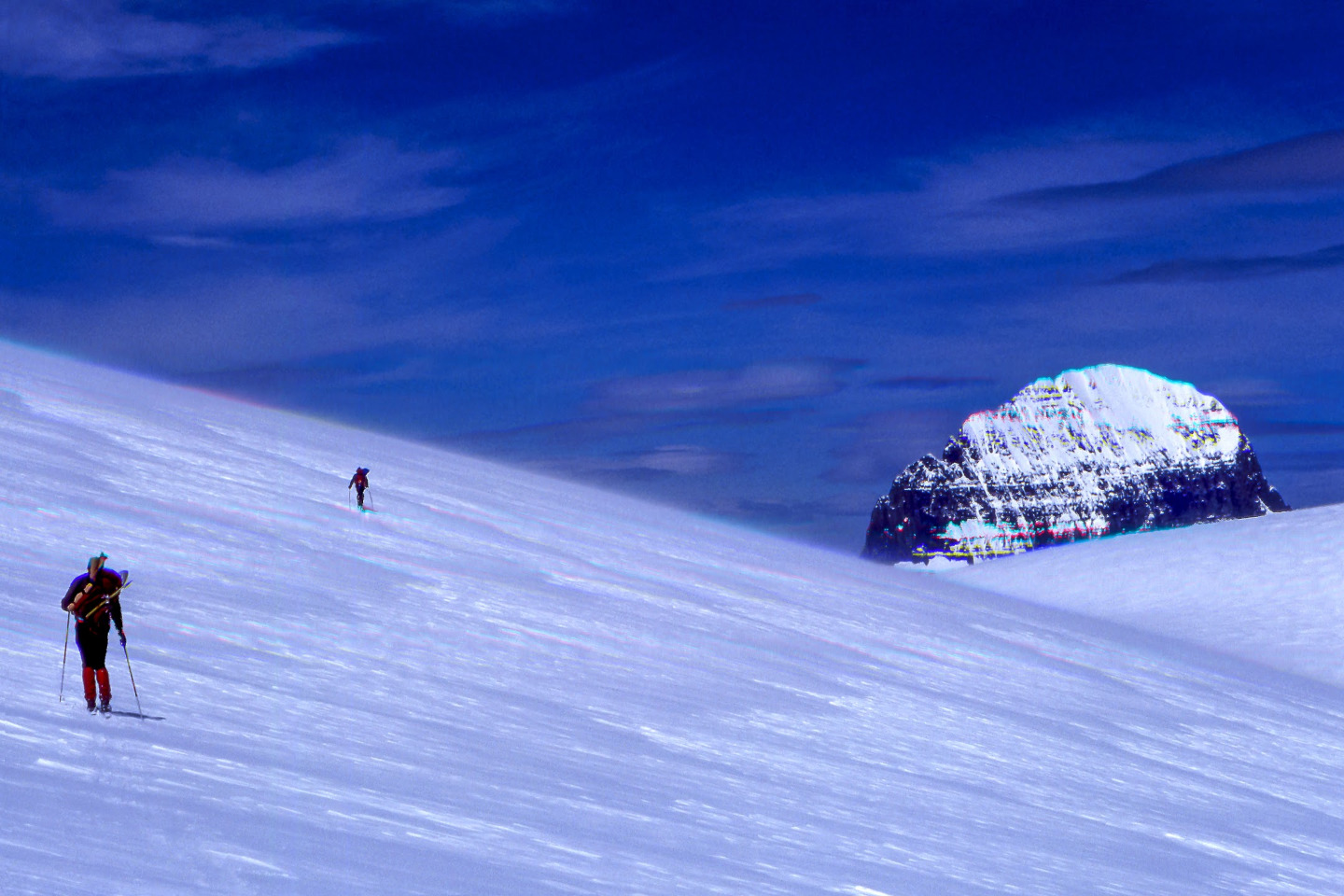
Mount Alberta from a high shoulder of the Columbia Icefield; on the way to The Twins (N & S). The ramp to the right leads to the Stutfields (E & W)

The Columbia Icefield was one of the last major geological features in western Canada to be visited and recorded by Europeans, due to its isolation and harsh weather conditions. In April 1827, Scottish botanist David Douglas was crossing Athabasca Pass—a major trading route located north of the Icefield—when he climbed one of the adjacent mountain peaks. He reported his first ascent in his journal, describing it to be 6,000 metres (20,000 ft) in height. In the summer of 1884, geology professor Arthur Philemon Coleman explored the Great Divide from Banff to Jasper in search of Douglas' giant peak. While unsuccessful, he did discover the route that would become the Icefield Parkway. In July 1898, British explorer J. Norman Collie and his friends Hugh Stutfield and Herman Wooley set off in search of Douglas' giants, equipped by the famous Banff outfitter Bill Peyto. On the morning of August 18, Collie and Wooley climbed the east side of Mount Athabasca, moved up the glacier when the ridge gave way to crumbling rock, and made their way to the summit, where they discovered an ice field that extended to almost every horizon. Collie later wrote:

The view that lay before us in the evening light was one that does not often fall to the lot of modern mountaineers. A new world was spread at our feet: to the westward stretched a vast ice-field probably never before seen by the human eye, and surrounded by entirely unknown, unnamed and unclimbed peaks.

In 1900, former British clergyman James Outram came to the Canadian Rockies to recover his health after a nervous breakdown. The following year he made the first ascent of Mount Assiniboine (3,618 m; 11,870 ft), then considered the "Matterhorn of the Rockies". In 1902, Outram made ten first ascents of peaks over 3,050 metres (10,010 ft) and discovered four new mountain passes in the Columbia Icefield area. Two of his first ascents in 1902 were Mount Columbia (3,747 m; 12,293 ft) and Mount Bryce (3,507 m; 11,506 ft), one of the most dangerous and difficult summits in the Rocky Mountains.

Following World War I, other mountaineering firsts occurred. In 1923, American climbers James Monroe Thorington and W. S. Ladd joined Austrian guide Conrad Kain to summit the daunting North Twin Peak (3,731 m; 12,241 ft), Mount Columbia, and Mount Saskatchewan (3,342 m; 10,965 ft) in five days. The following year, another American expedition led by William O. Field and guide Edward Feuz climbed both the North Twin Peak and the South Twin Peak (3,566 m; 11,699 ft) in twenty-four hours—a combined distance of about 60 kilometres (37 mi). In 1927, A. J. Ostheimer discovered a new route to the North Peak Summit, made first ascents of Stutfield Peak (3,450 m; 11,320 ft) and Mount Kitchener (3,505 m; 11,499 ft), and became the first climber to traverse the Snow Dome (3,456 m; 11,339 ft) in 36 hours. During his 63-day visit to the Columbia Icefield, Ostheimer and his two companions walked over a 1,000 kilometres (620 mi) and climbed thirty peaks—twenty-five of which were first ascents.

In March 1932, three men undertook a remarkable skiing journey from Jasper to Banff that covered about 500 kilometres (310 mi). When Cliff White, Joe Weiss, and Russell Bennet reached the Columbia Icefield, they climbed to the summit of Snow Dome, and then made a downhill run descent of almost 3,000 metres (9,800 ft) which lasted for 50 kilometres (31 mi)—the longest continuous ski run in Canadian history up to that point. Their accomplishment played a major role in generating worldwide interest in the Canadian Rockies. Today, mountaineers and skiers from around the world come to the Columbia Icefield to explore some of the classic routes discovered by these early pioneers of mountaineering.

== Glaciers ==
The icefield feeds six major glaciers:

- Athabasca Glacier
- Castleguard Glacier
- Columbia Glacier
- Dome Glacier
- Stutfield Glacier
- Saskatchewan Glacier

Parts of the Columbia Icefield and part of other icefields and glaciers are visible from the Icefields Parkway.

The icefield was first reported in 1898 by J. Norman Collie and Hermann Woolley after they had completed the first ascent of Mount Athabasca.

The Athabasca River and the North Saskatchewan River originate in the Columbia Icefield, as do tributary headwaters of the Columbia River. As the icefield is atop a triple Continental Divide these waters flow ultimately north to the Arctic Ocean, east to Hudson Bay (and thence to the North Atlantic Ocean), and south and west to the Pacific Ocean. Hudson Bay, in some watershed divisions, is considered to be in the Arctic watershed, in which case this would arguably not be a triple continental divide point.

== Mountains ==
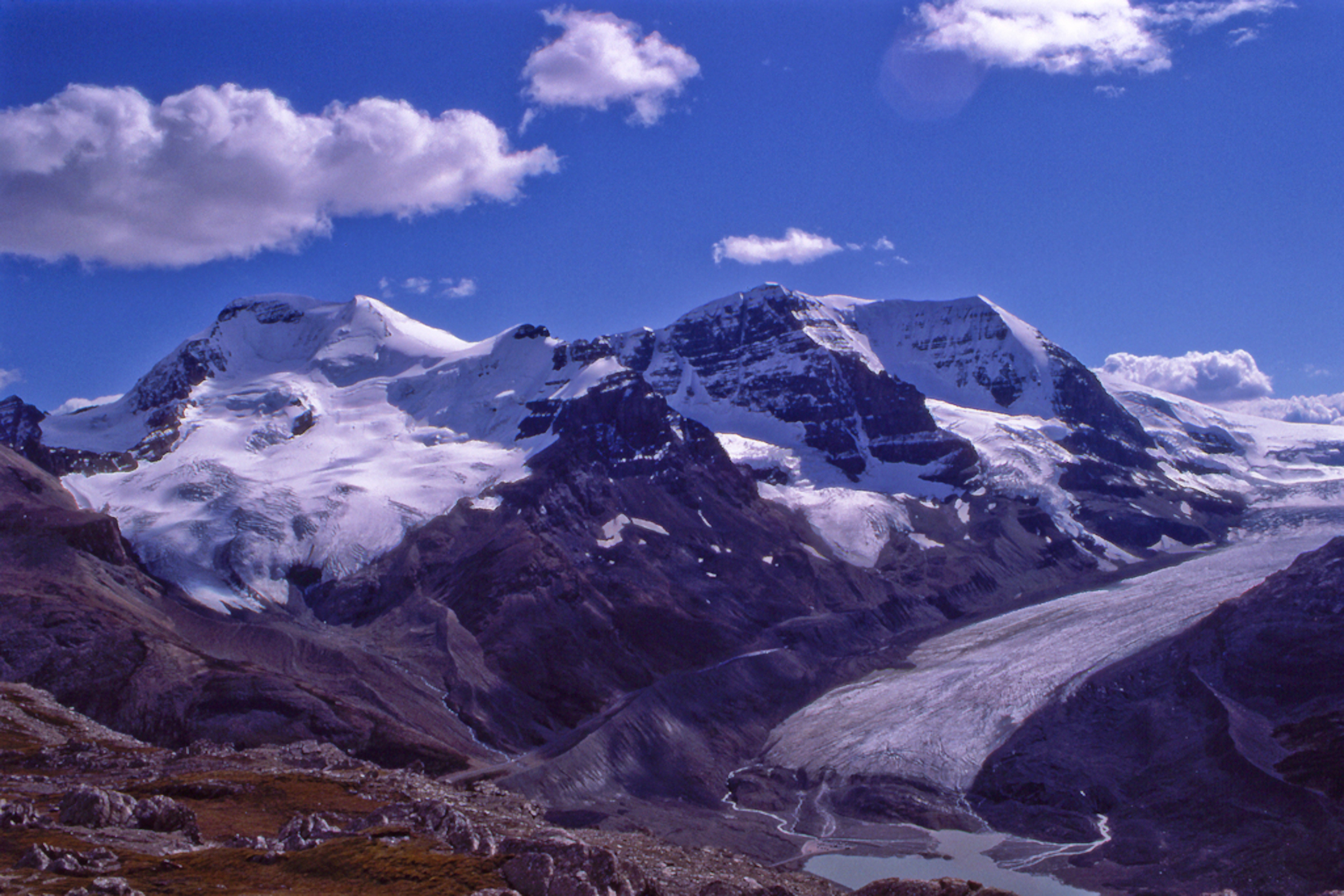
Mts. Athabasca & Andromeda, Athabasca Glacier and a sliver of the Columbia Icefield from Wilcox Pass

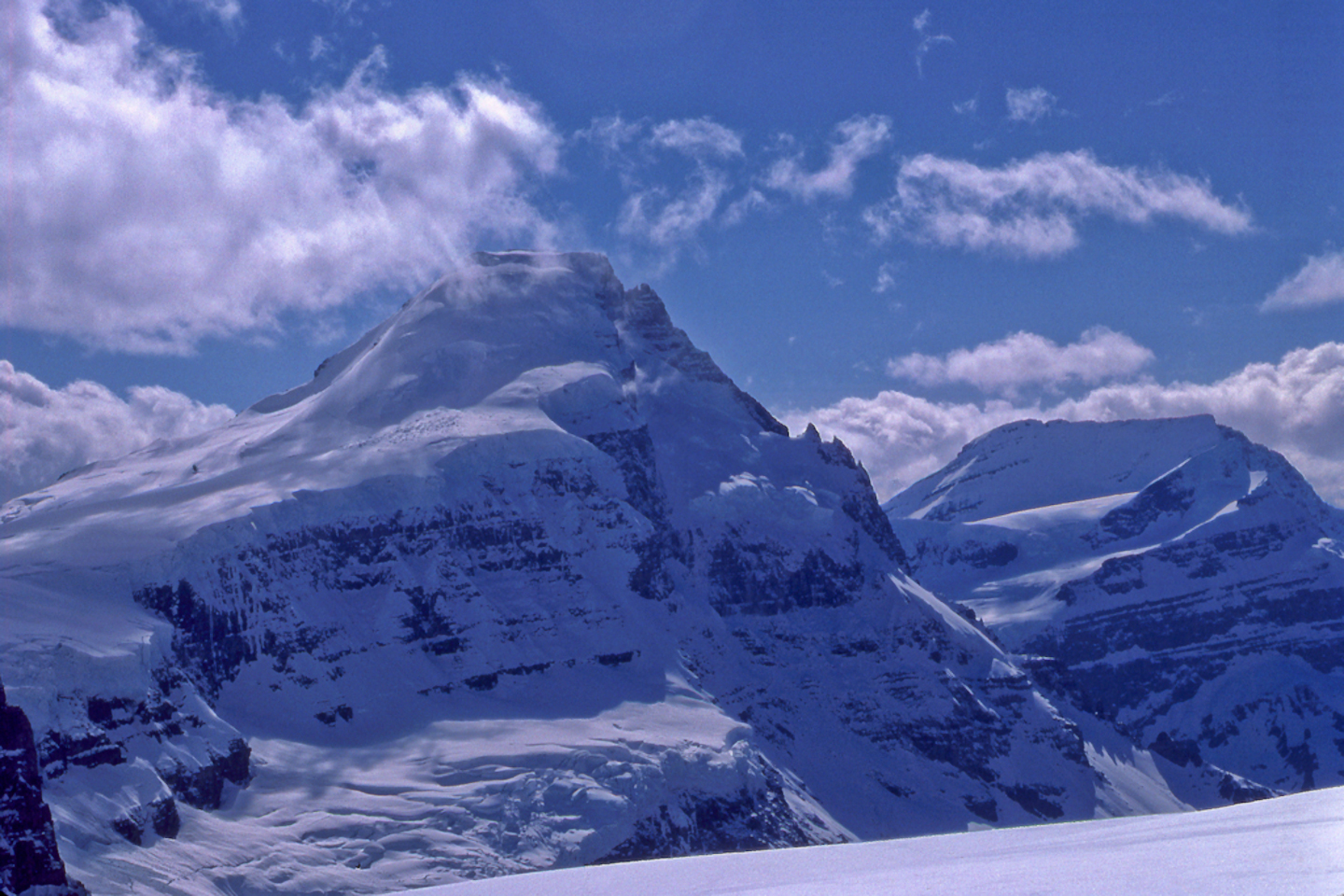
Mts. Columbia & King Edward from Colum. Icefield

Some of the highest mountains in the Canadian Rockies are located around the edges:

- Mount Alberta (3,619 m; 11,873 ft)
- Mount Andromeda (3,450 m; 11,320 ft)
- Mount Athabasca (3,491 m; 11,453 ft)
- Mount Bryce (3,507 m; 11,506 ft)
- Mount Castleguard (3,090 m; 10,140 ft)
- Mount Columbia (3,747 m; 12,293 ft)
- Mount King Edward (3,490 m; 11,450 ft)
- Mount Kitchener (3,505 m; 11,499 ft)
- North Twin Peak (3,684 m; 12,087 ft)
- South Twin Peak (3,566 m; 11,699 ft)
- Snow Dome (3,456 m; 11,339 ft)
- Stutfield Peak (3,450 m; 11,320 ft)

== Climate ==
Columbia Icefield has an alpine climate (Köppen: ETf), because the weather station is located at an altitude of 1,981.20 m (6,500 ft). The average annual temperature is −2.1 °C (28.2 °F). The month of July is the warmest with an average temperature of 9.1 °C (48.38 °F).

Climate data for Columbia Icefield (1951–1980)
Month	Jan	Feb	Mar	Apr	May	Jun	Jul	Aug	Sep	Oct	Nov	Dec	Year
Record high °C (°F)	4.4 (39.9)	9.4 (48.9)	6.7 (44.1)	18.9 (66.0)	22.2 (72.0)	23.3 (73.9)	26.1 (79.0)	25.6 (78.1)	21.7 (71.1)	17.2 (63.0)	8.9 (48.0)	3.9 (39.0)	26.1 (79.0)
Mean daily maximum °C (°F)	−9.4 (15.1)	−5.4 (22.3)	−2.6 (27.3)	3.1 (37.6)	9.1 (48.4)	12.1 (53.8)	15.2 (59.4)	14.3 (57.7)	10.3 (50.5)	3.5 (38.3)	−4.3 (24.3)	−6.6 (20.1)	3.3 (37.9)
Daily mean °C (°F)	−14.2 (6.4)	−10.5 (13.1)	−8.6 (16.5)	−3.3 (26.1)	2.8 (37.0)	6.2 (43.2)	9.1 (48.4)	8.6 (47.5)	5.0 (41.0)	−1.2 (29.8)	−8.2 (17.2)	−10.7 (12.7)	−2.1 (28.2)
Mean daily minimum °C (°F)	−19.0 (−2.2)	−15.5 (4.1)	−14.6 (5.7)	−9.7 (14.5)	−3.5 (25.7)	0.2 (32.4)	2.9 (37.2)	2.7 (36.9)	−0.5 (31.1)	−5.9 (21.4)	−12.1 (10.2)	−14.8 (5.4)	−7.5 (18.5)
Record low °C (°F)	−41.1 (−42.0)	−30.0 (−22.0)	−35.0 (−31.0)	−22.8 (−9.0)	−17.8 (0.0)	−12.2 (10.0)	−9.4 (15.1)	−6.1 (21.0)	−15.0 (5.0)	−26.1 (−15.0)	−32.0 (−25.6)	−36.0 (−32.8)	−41.1 (−42.0)
Average precipitation mm (inches)	112.6 (4.43)	83.9 (3.30)	72.1 (2.84)	70.1 (2.76)	37.9 (1.49)	74.8 (2.94)	69.1 (2.72)	50.5 (1.99)	53.0 (2.09)	113.1 (4.45)	112.3 (4.42)	80.7 (3.18)	930.1 (36.62)
Average rainfall mm (inches)	0.9 (0.04)	0.9 (0.04)	0.8 (0.03)	3.1 (0.12)	7.1 (0.28)	58.5 (2.30)	49.9 (1.96)	55.4 (2.18)	39.5 (1.56)	17.8 (0.70)	1.9 (0.07)	2.8 (0.11)	238.6 (9.39)
Average snowfall cm (inches)	106.9 (42.1)	94.8 (37.3)	58.9 (23.2)	83.1 (32.7)	35.0 (13.8)	10.0 (3.9)	1.4 (0.6)	2.1 (0.8)	13.8 (5.4)	64.7 (25.5)	79.7 (31.4)	92.5 (36.4)	642.9 (253.1)
Average precipitation days (≥ 0.2 mm)	15	13	14	10	11	15	13	14	14	12	13	13	157
Average rainy days (≥ 0.2 mm)	0	0	0	1	2	14	13	12	11	4	0	0	57
Average snowy days (≥ 0.2 cm)	17	15	15	13	5	1	1	0	2	10	11	12	102
Source: Environment Canada

== See also ==
- Columbia Wetlands
- List of glaciers in Canada

== Gallery ==
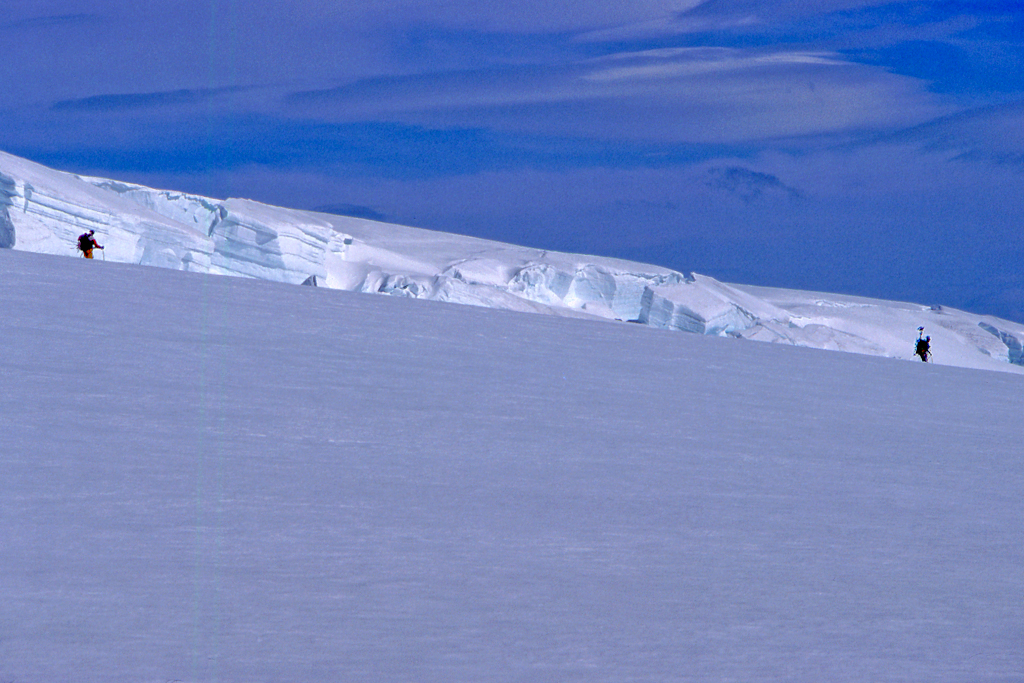
Snow Dome and the Columbia Icefield

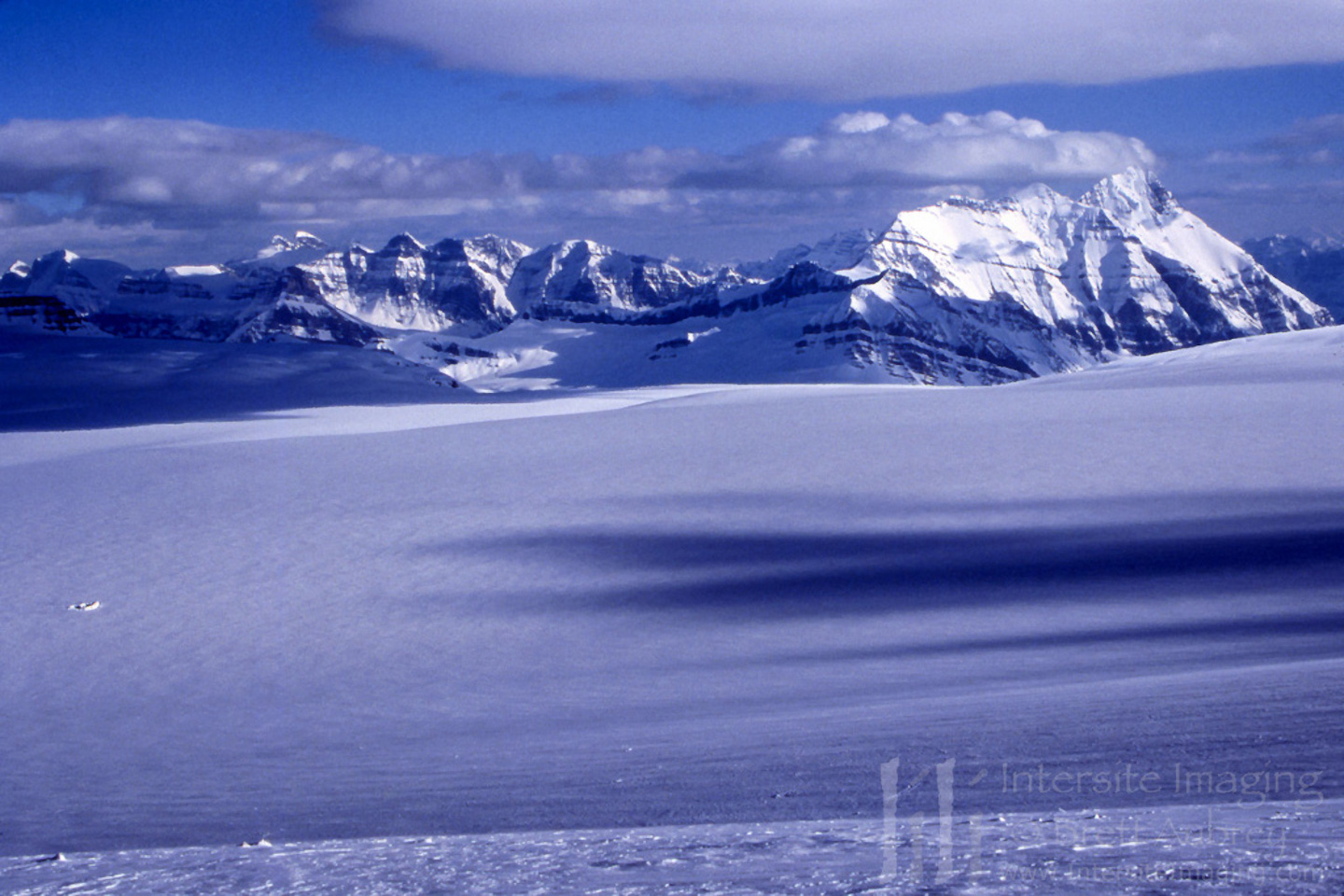
Columbia Icefield; Mt. Bryce right, our tent left

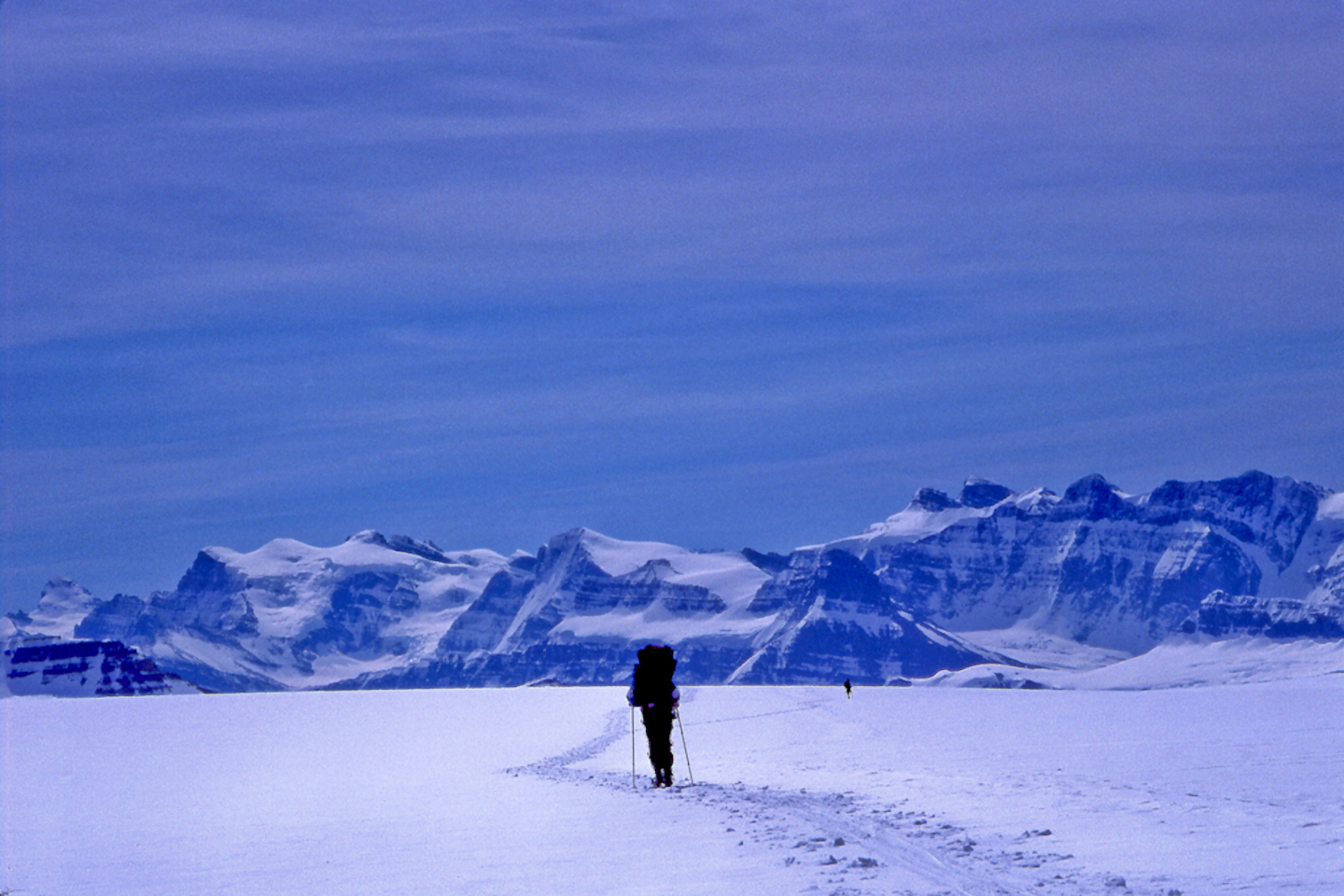
Skiing the Columbia Icefield

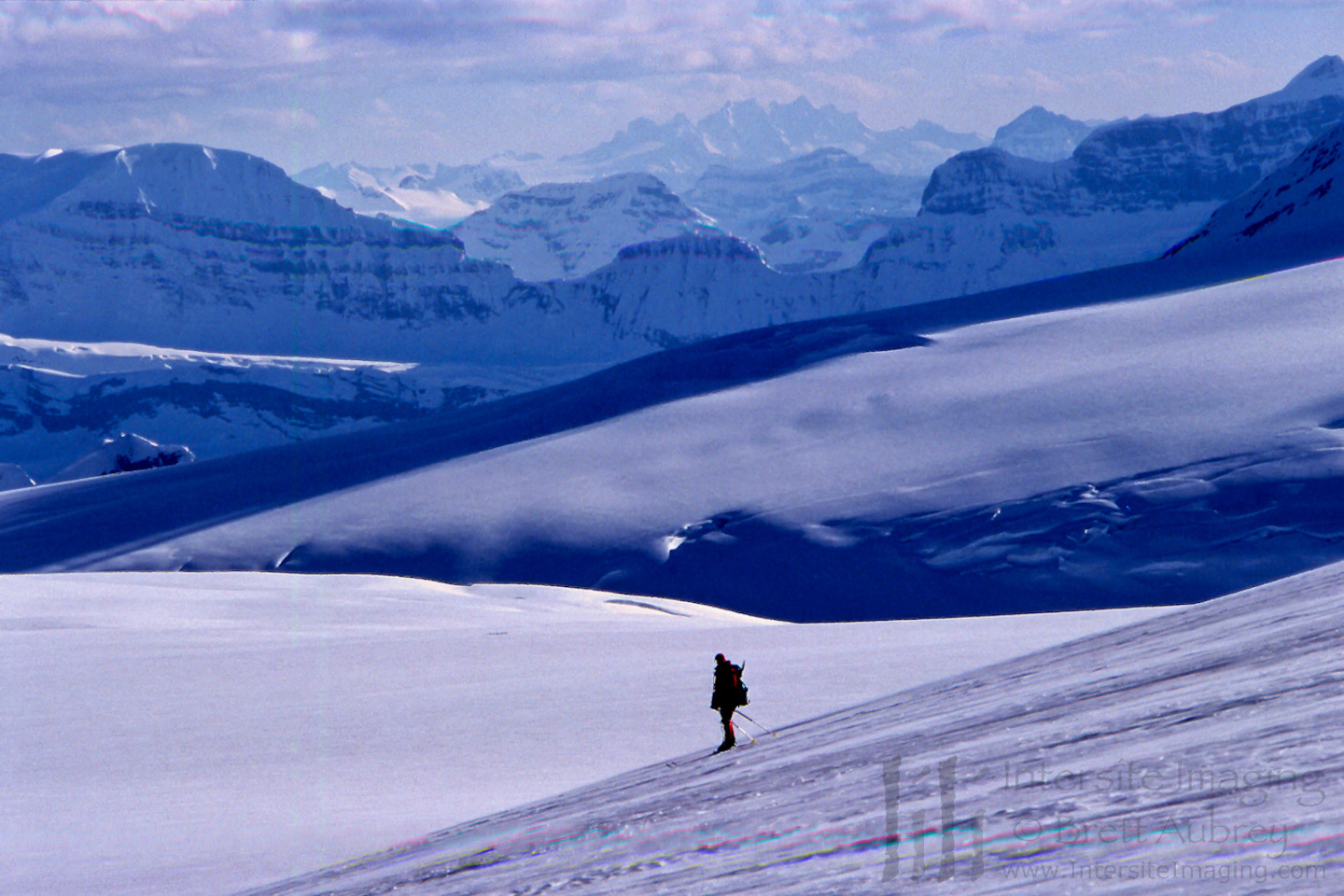
Peaks to the West of the Icefield
