= Mount Bryce =

Mountain in British Columbia, Canada

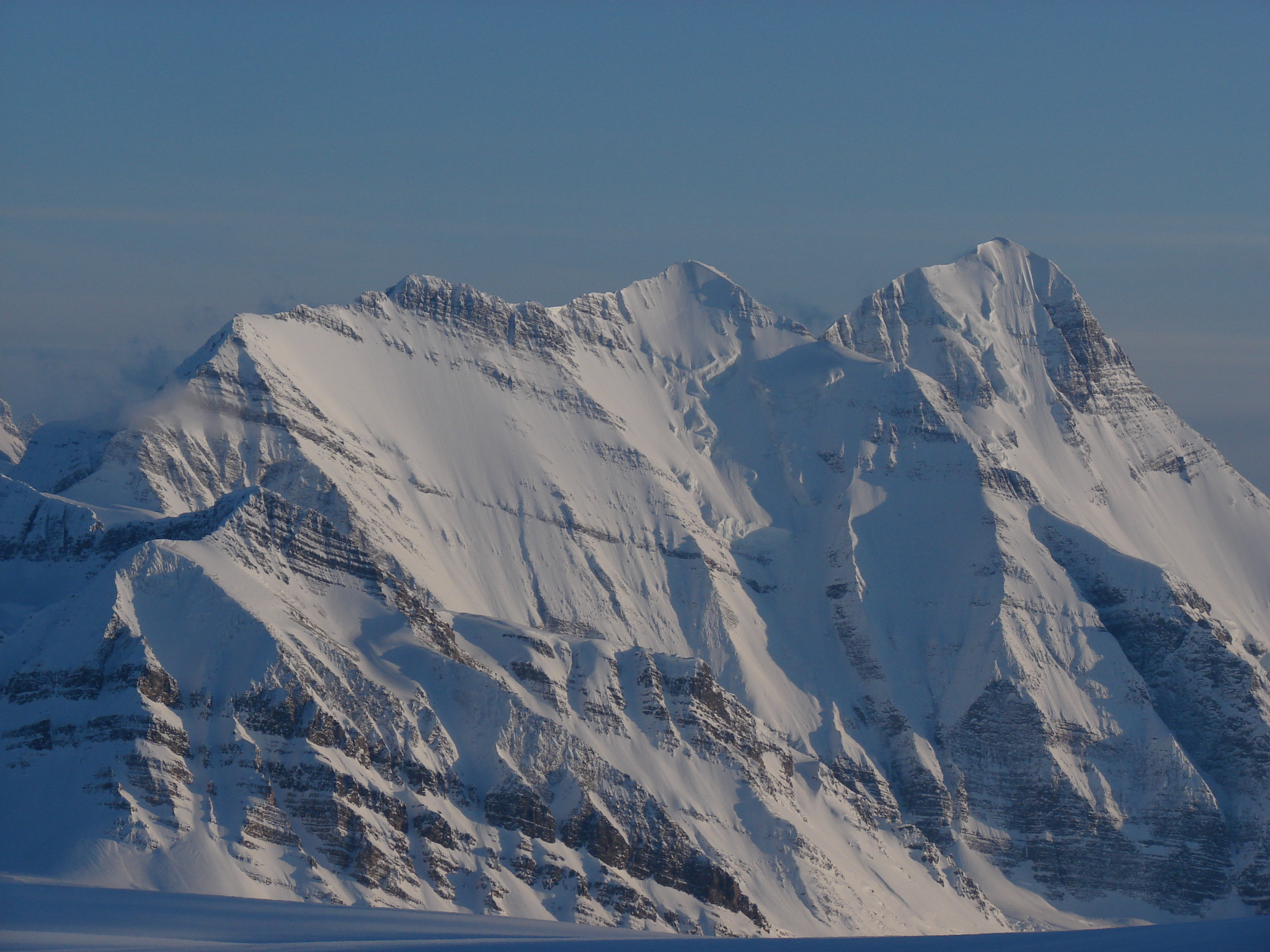
- North face of Mt. Bryce seen from Columbia Icefield

Highest point
- Elevation: 3,507 m (11,506 ft)
- Prominence: 707 m (2,320 ft)
- Listing: Mountains of British Columbia
- Coordinates: 52°02′28″N 117°19′49″W

Geography
- Location within British Columbia
- Country: Canada
- Province: British Columbia
- District: Kootenay Land District
- Parent range: Park Ranges
- Topo map: NTS 83C3 Columbia Icefield

Climbing
- First ascent: 1902 by James Outram and Christian Kaufmann
- Easiest route: rock/snow/glacier climb

Mount Bryce is a mountain at the southwestern corner of the Columbia Icefield, in British Columbia, Canada, near the border with Alberta. It can be seen from the Icefields Parkway.

The mountain was named in 1898 by J. Norman Collie after Viscount James Bryce, who was President of the Alpine Club (London) at the time.

Mount Bryce is the fifteenth-highest peak in British Columbia. To the north, it is connected by ridges to the Columbia Icefield. The mountain is rarely climbed due to difficult access although recently built logging roads are alleviating some of the access problems.

== Gallery ==
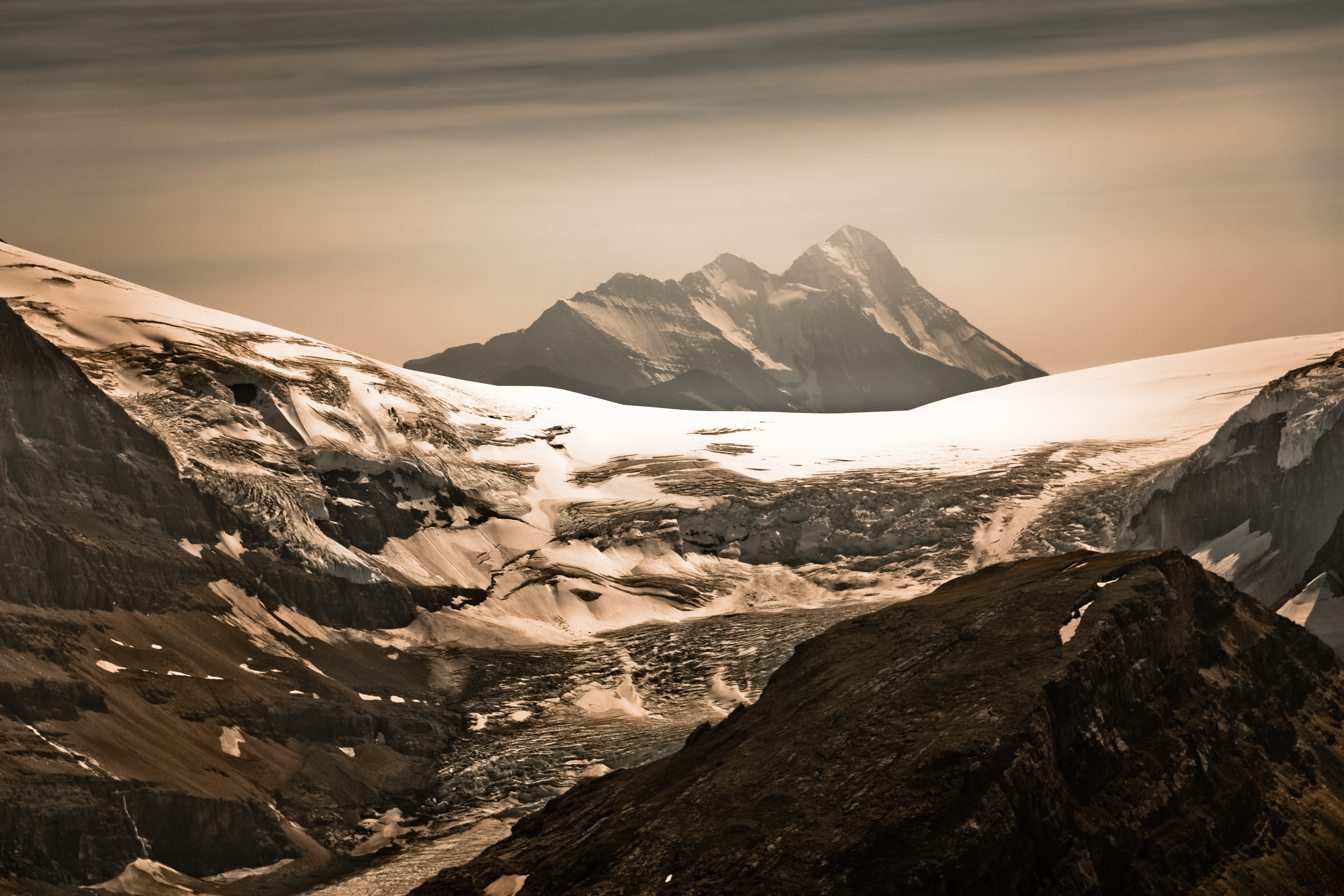
Mount Bryce from Mount Wilcox

== See also ==
- List of mountains in the Canadian Rockies
