= Mount Alberta =

Mountain in Jasper NP, Alberta, Canada

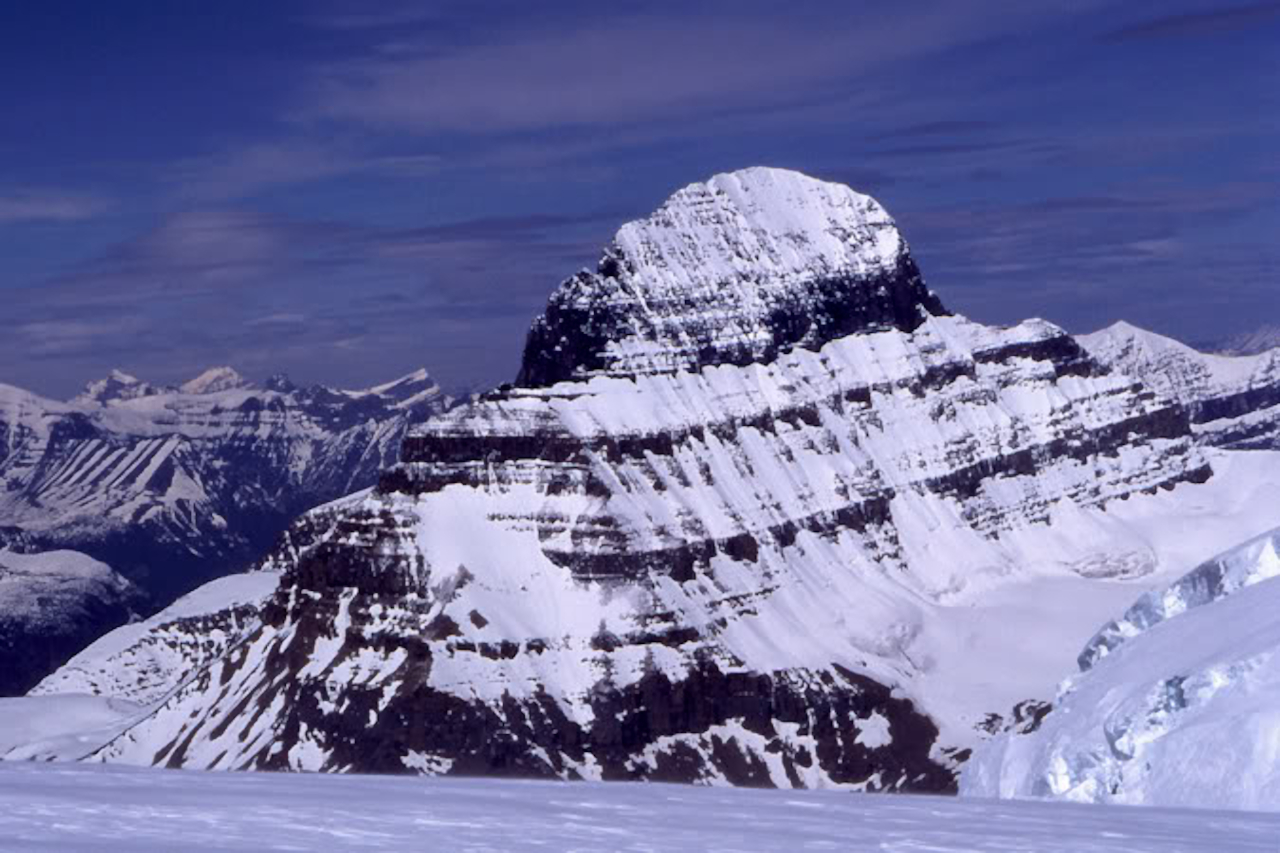
- Mt. Alberta from Northern edge of Columbia Icefield

Highest point
- Elevation: 3,619 m (11,873 ft)
- Prominence: 819 m (2,687 ft)
- Listing: Mountains of Alberta; Canada highest major peaks 33rd
- Coordinates: 52°17′14″N 117°28′36″W

Geography
- Location within Alberta
- Country: Canada
- Province: Alberta
- Protected area: Jasper National Park
- Parent range: Winston Churchill Range
- Topo map: NTS 83C5 Fortress Lake

Climbing
- First ascent: July 21, 1925, by a Japanese team (Six Japanese men including Yūkō Maki and three men from Switzerland)
- Easiest route: rock/snow climb

Mount Alberta is a mountain located in the upper Athabasca River Valley of Jasper National Park, Alberta, Canada. J. Norman Collie named the mountain in 1898 after Princess Louise Caroline Alberta. It is the most difficult of the 11,000ers from a climbing point of view.

Mount Alberta is the fifth-highest peak of the Canadian Rockies and the third highest in Alberta. It is situated 80 kilometres (50 mi) southeast of the town of Jasper, just beyond the Northern extent of the Columbia Icefield. According to the Climber's Guide, Mount Alberta is "One of the finest peaks in the Rockies, a singular uplift that is difficult on all sides."

== Climbing ==
History

The mountain's first ascent was made in 1925 by a group of climbers from the Japanese Alpine Club. They were headed by Yūkō Maki, who four years earlier had made the first ascent of the Eiger's Mittellegi Ridge. The other Japanese team members were T. Hayakawa, Y.Mita, S. Hashimoto, H. Hatano and N. Okabe. Two Swiss guides, Heinrich Fuhrer (Note: It has been written that Heinrich Fuhrer "appears to have come to Canada specifically for this climb. He is not to be confused with another Heinrich Fuhrer, the brother of Hans Fuhrer, who guided in the Jasper area only a few years later". A contemporary account provides further conformation by stating that "they engaged Heinrich Fuhrer, the brother of Ulrich of Finsteraarhorn fame, and Hans Kohler, the son of the well-known Niklaus Kohler of Meiringen" and "shortly after the climb Mr. Maki and his party embarked for Japan and, later, the Swiss members returned to Europe.") and Hans Kohler guided the party, Jean Weber, an amateur Swiss mountaineer who also happened to be in Jasper at the time acted as assistant guide.

They started climbing on July 21, 1925. After some difficulty in dealing with an overhang and a steep series of ledges for 16 hours, they reached the top and ceremoniously planted an ice axe. The ice axe was left as a symbol of their achievement. The second party that achieved the ascent found this ice axe 23 years later, and brought it back to the American Alpine Club in New York. The handle of the ice axe had been broken by the ice and rocks. In 1969, the handle was found by a Japanese party, and the two parts were put together in Tokyo in 1997. This ice axe is now exhibited in Jasper Yellowhead Museum.

It was not until 1948, more than twenty years after Maki's party made the first ascent, that the Americans Fred D. Ayers and John Cameron Oberlin made the second ascent. In 1958, the first ascent by a Canadian team was completed by Neil Brown, Hans Gmoser, Leo Grillmair, Heinz Kahl and Sarka Spinkova.

Routes

There are a number of standard climbing routes:

- Japanese Route (Normal Route) V 5.6
- North Face VI 5.9 A3
- North-East Ridge V 5.10

== See also ==
- List of mountains of Canada
- List of mountains in the Canadian Rockies
- Royal eponyms in Canada

== Gallery ==
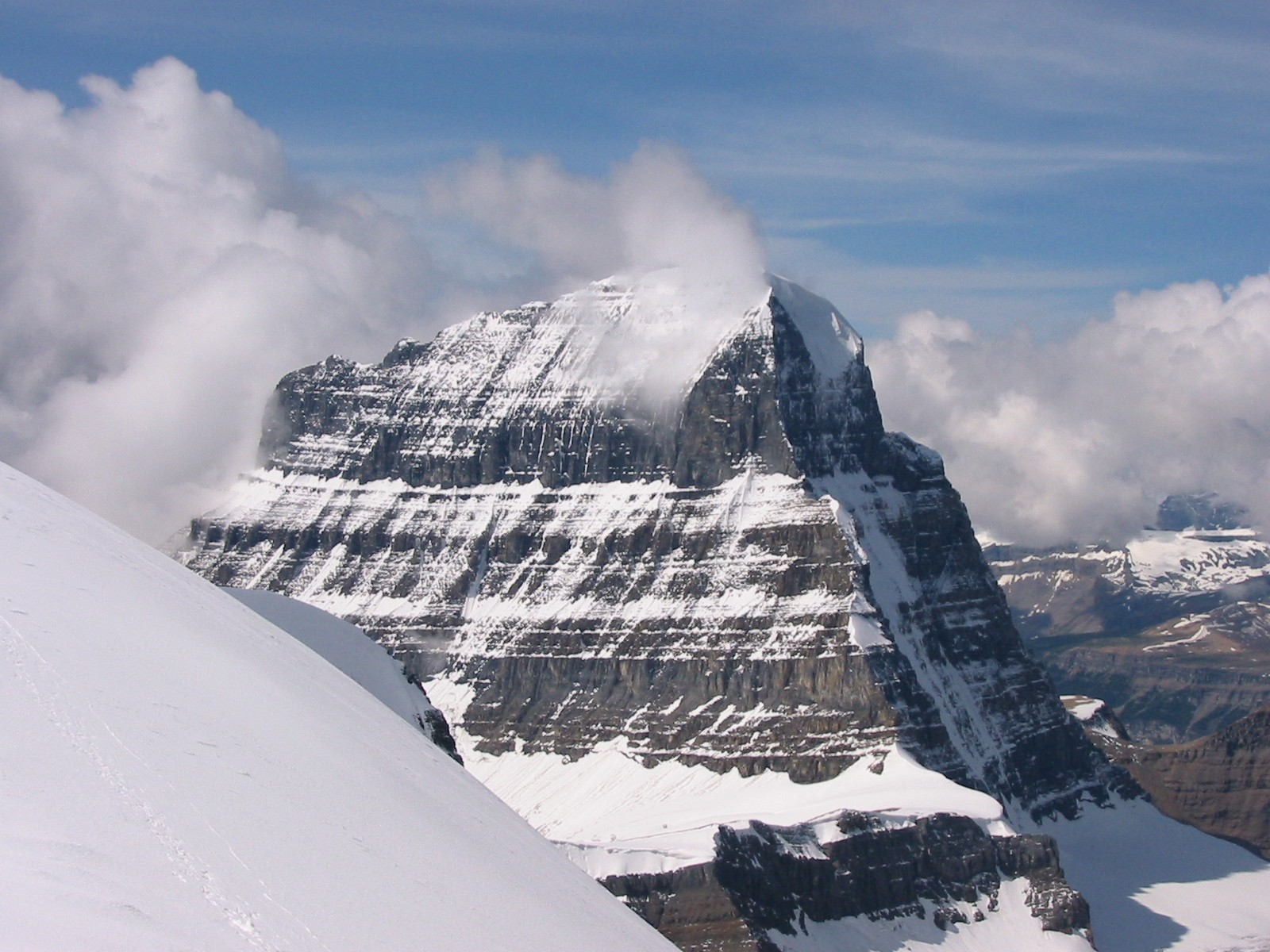
Mount Alberta seen from near the summit of Diadem Peak

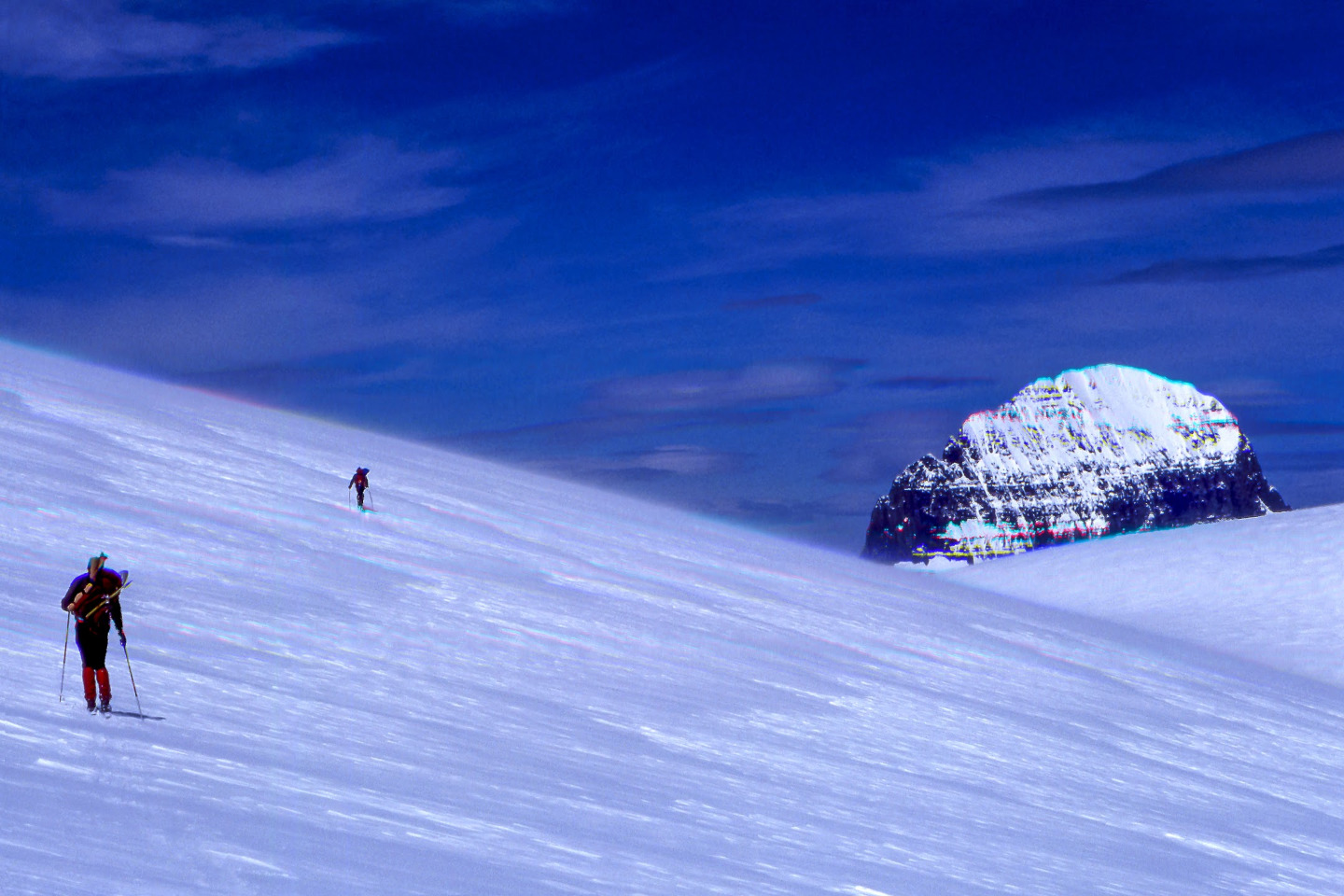
Mt. Alberta seen from the Columbia Icefield

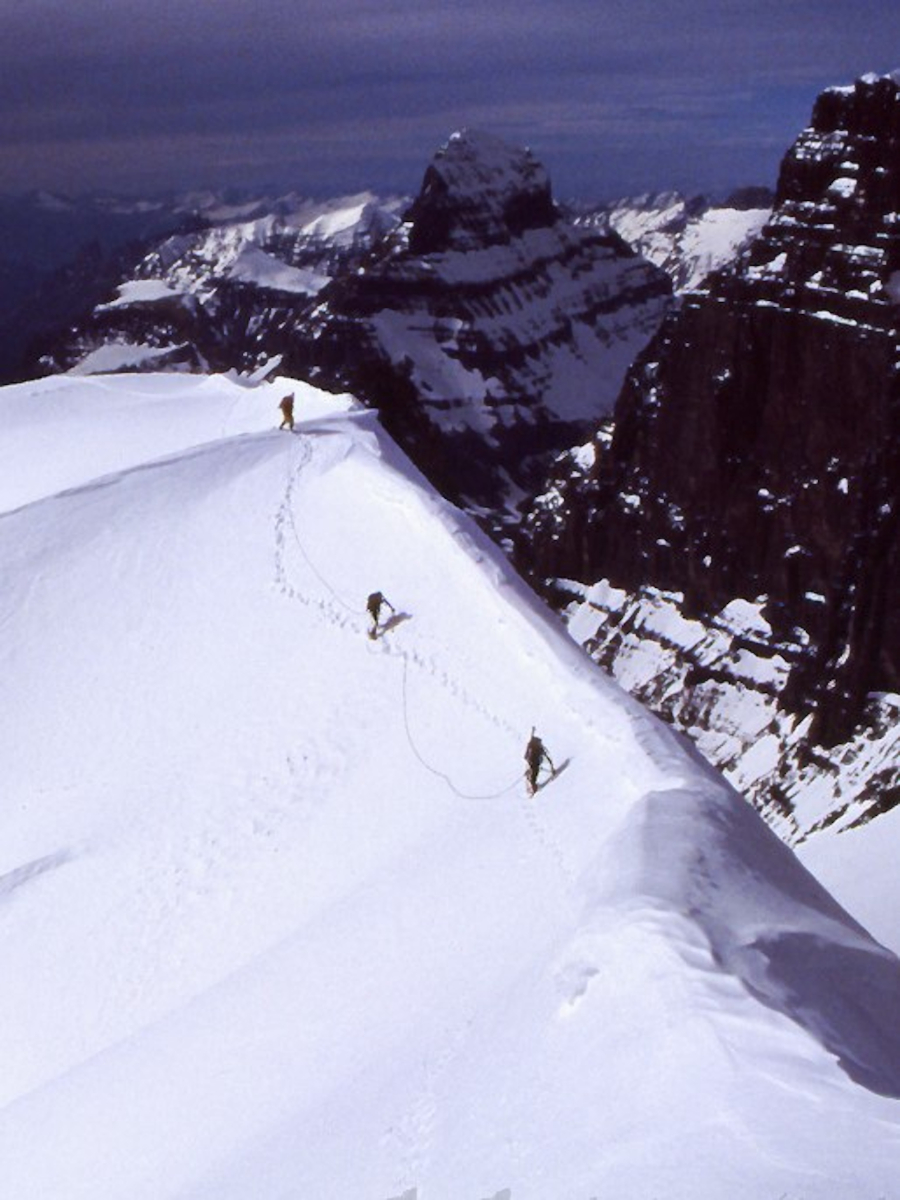
Mt. Alberta (Ctr) from South Twin summit
