= Arthabaska =

Arthabaska may refer to:

- Arthabaska (electoral district), current provincial electoral district
- Arthabaska County, Quebec
- Arthabaska Regional County Municipality, Quebec
- Drummond—Arthabaska, former federal electoral district
- Richmond—Arthabaska, current federal electoral district

== See also ==
- Athabasca (disambiguation), several places in Alberta, shares the same root
- Victoriaville, once known as Arthabaska
