= Athabasca Glacier =

Glacier in Alberta, Canada

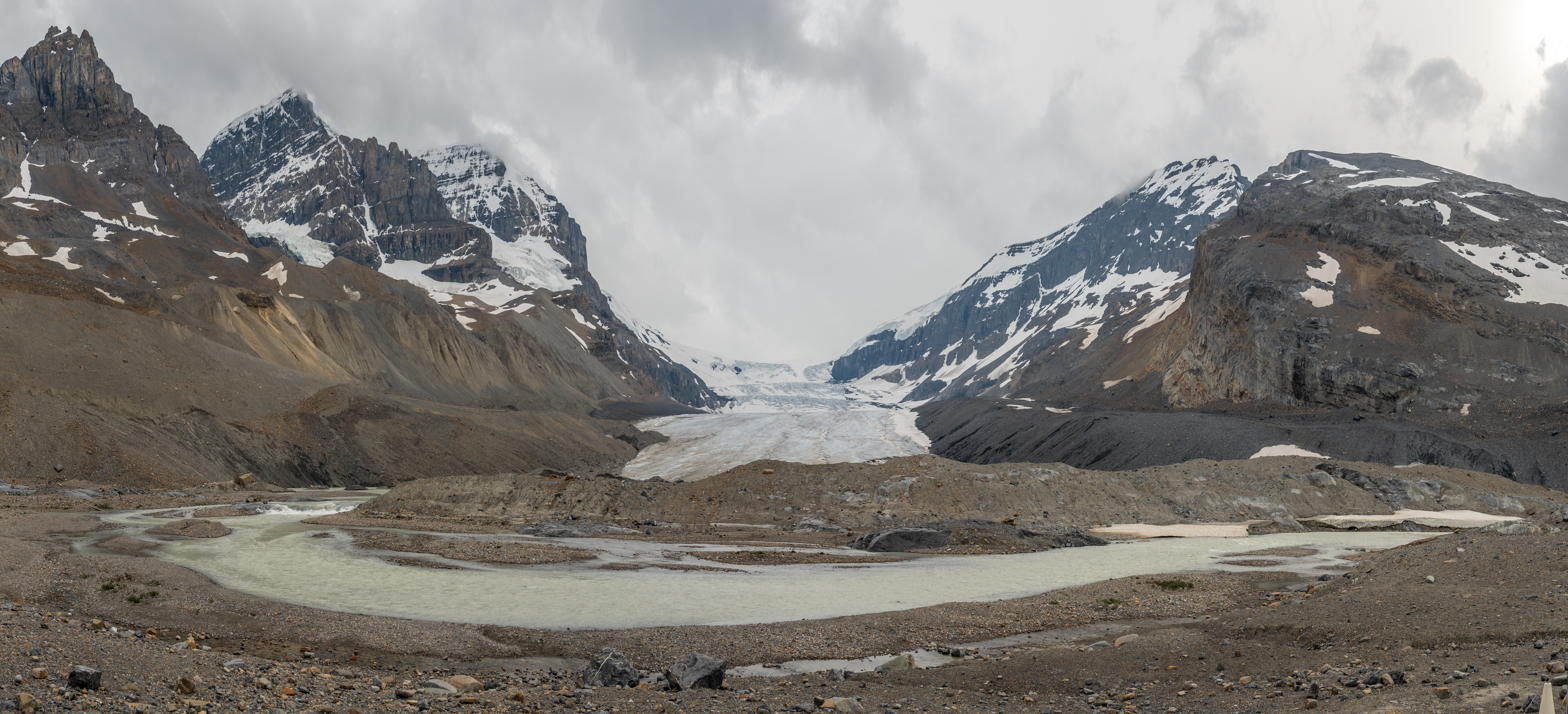
- Athabasca Glacier from the valley floor, July 2026

- Location within Alberta Location within British Columbia Location within Canada
- Interactive map of Athabasca Glacier
- Location: Columbia Icefield
- Coordinates: 52°11′55″N 117°14′37″W
- Area: 6 km^{2} (2.3 sq mi)
- Length: 6 km (3.7 mi)
- Thickness: 90–300 metres (300–980 ft)
- Status: Receding

The Athabasca Glacier is one of the six principal toes of the Columbia Icefield, located in the Canadian Rockies. The glacier currently loses thickness at a rate of about 5 metres (16 ft) per year and has receded more than 1.5 km (0.93 mi) and lost over half of its volume in the past 125 years. Easily accessible, it is the most visited glacier in North America. The leading edge of the glacier is within easy walking distance; however, travel onto the glacier is not recommended unless properly equipped. Hidden crevasses have led to the deaths of unprepared tourists.

The Columbia Icefield Glacier Discovery Centre, closed during the winter (mid-October to mid-April), stands across from the glacier. It is used as a lodge and for ticket sales for sightseeing on the glacier. There are also two restaurants and a Starbucks located in the centre. Standard buses transport tourists from the centre to the glacier edge, where they board specially designed snow coaches for transport over the steep grades, snow and ice part way up the glacier.

The glacier is approximately 6 km (3.7 mi) long, covers an area of 6 km^{2} (2.3 sq mi), and is measured to be between 90–300 metres (300–980 ft) thick.

== Notable accidents ==
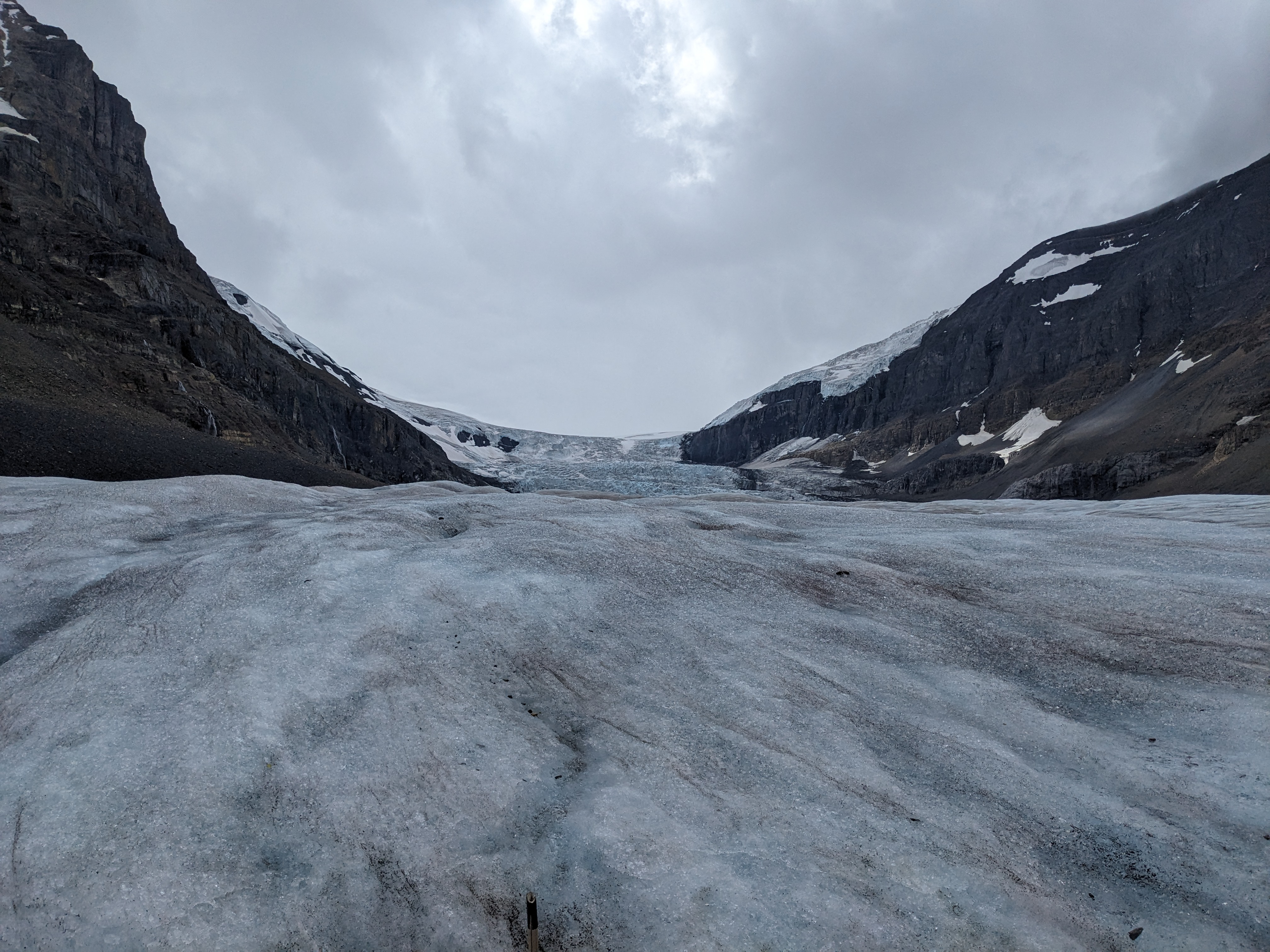
Close-up view of the Athabasca Glacier, showing the intricate topography. The three "steps" of the glacier are clear, as well as the many crevasses that can make traversing the glacier a challenge.

On 18 July 2020, a sightseeing snow coach rolled over on the glacier's moraine early in the afternoon, killing 3 passengers and injuring 24 others. Survivors were first airlifted by Parks Canada helicopters to a triage area. Nineteen of the occupants, 14 of whom suffered critical injuries, were then transported to the nearest hospitals via air and ground. In addition to countless first responders and EMS crews, three STARS helicopters from Calgary, Edmonton, and Grande Prairie responded to this multiple casualty incident.

On 5 October 2018, an employee of the sightseeing company died in the parking lot after suffering serious injuries when she was struck by her unmanned bus following a collision. The woman succumbed to her injuries upon arrival of the STARS air ambulance crew.

== See also ==
- List of glaciers in Canada
- Athabasca

== Gallery ==
Athabasca Glacier tour in 2006

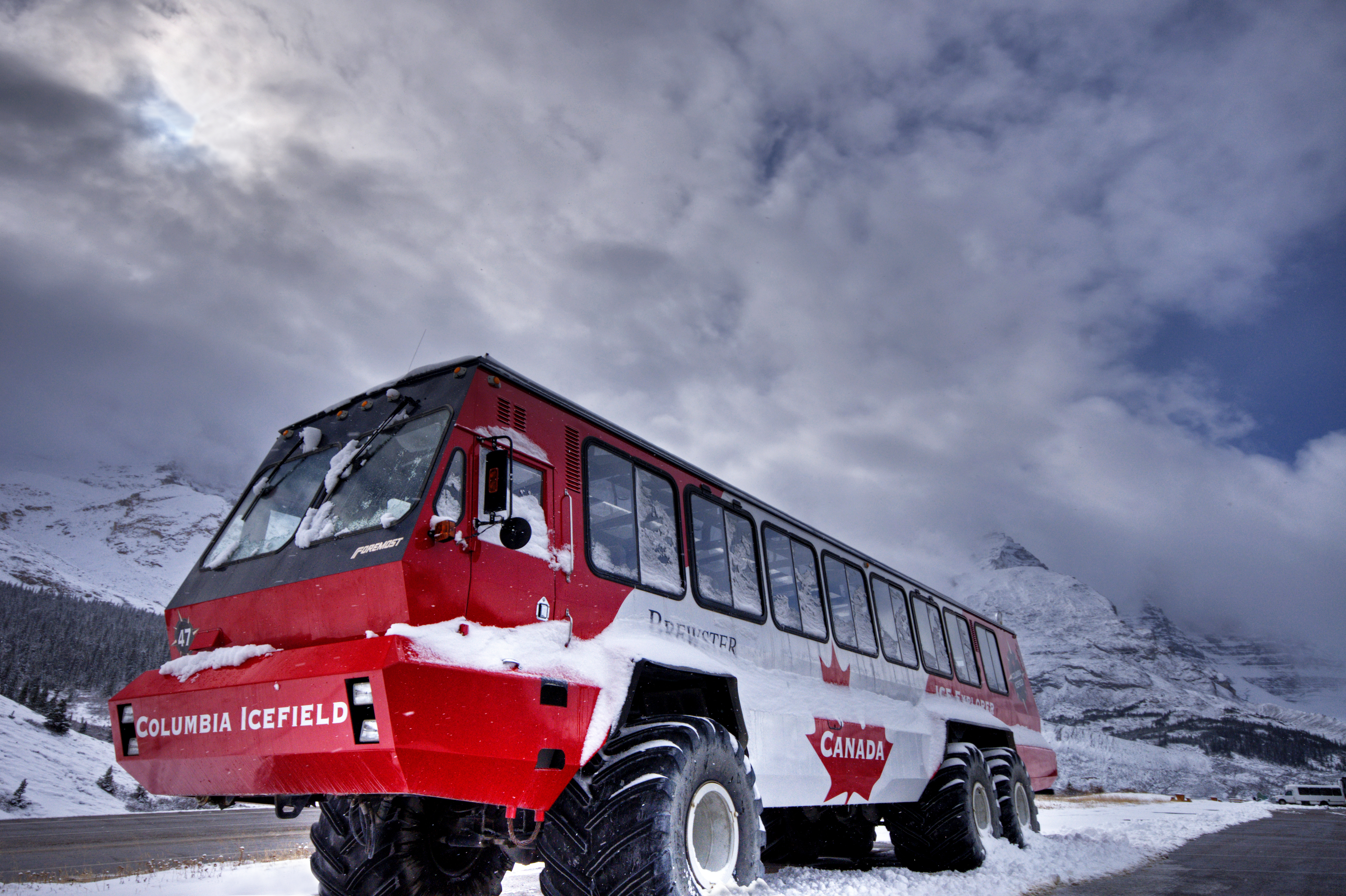
Athabasca Glacier snow coach in 2009

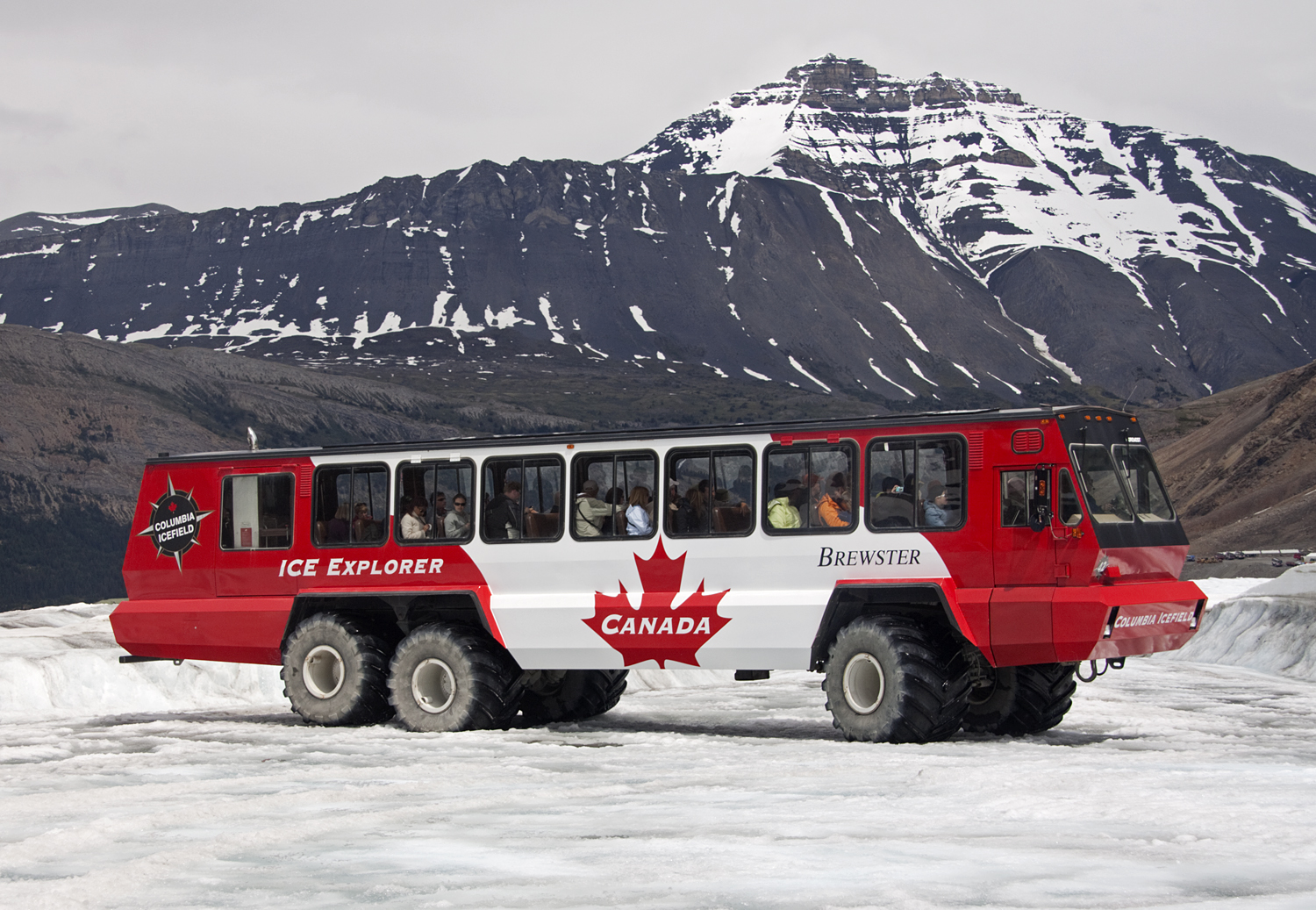
Terra Bus on the Athabasca Glacier in 2010

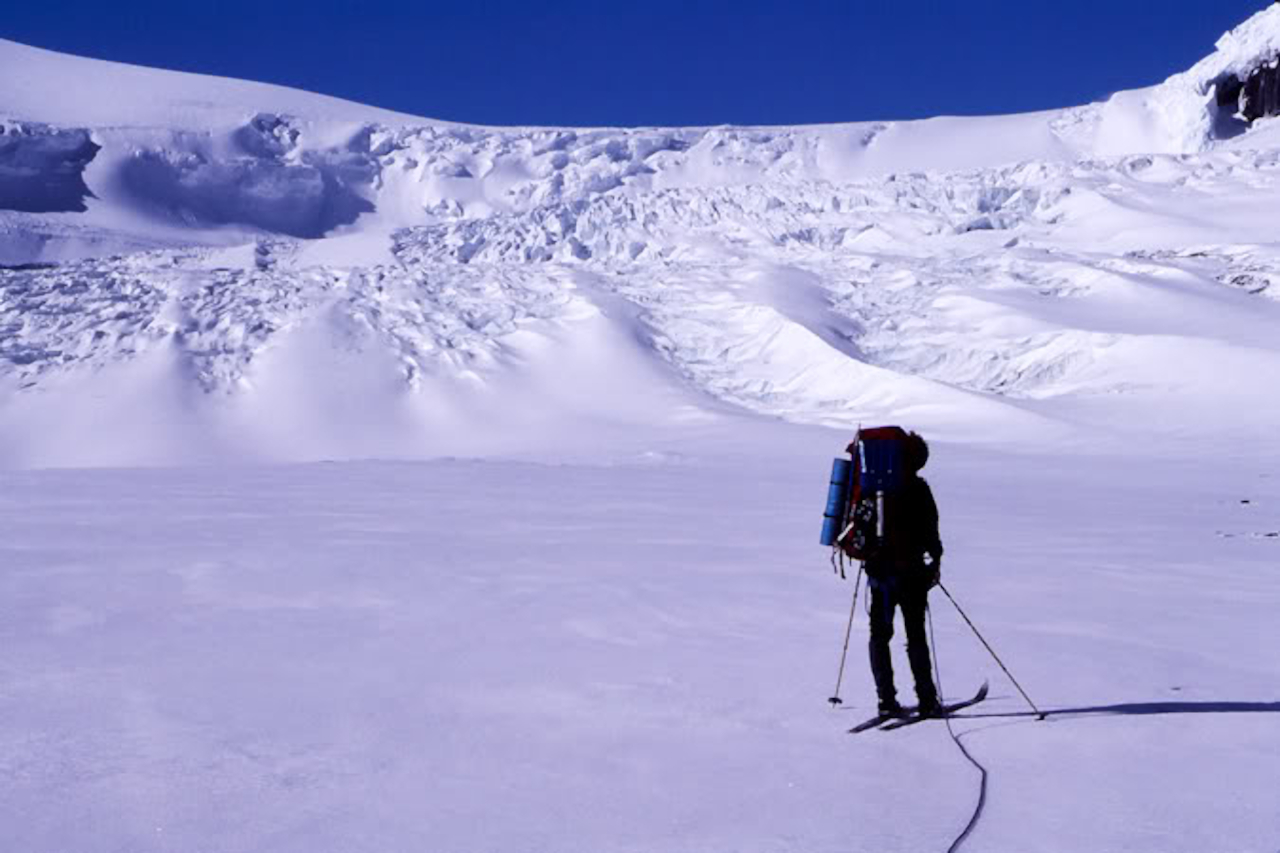
Approaching Athabasca Glacier Headwall

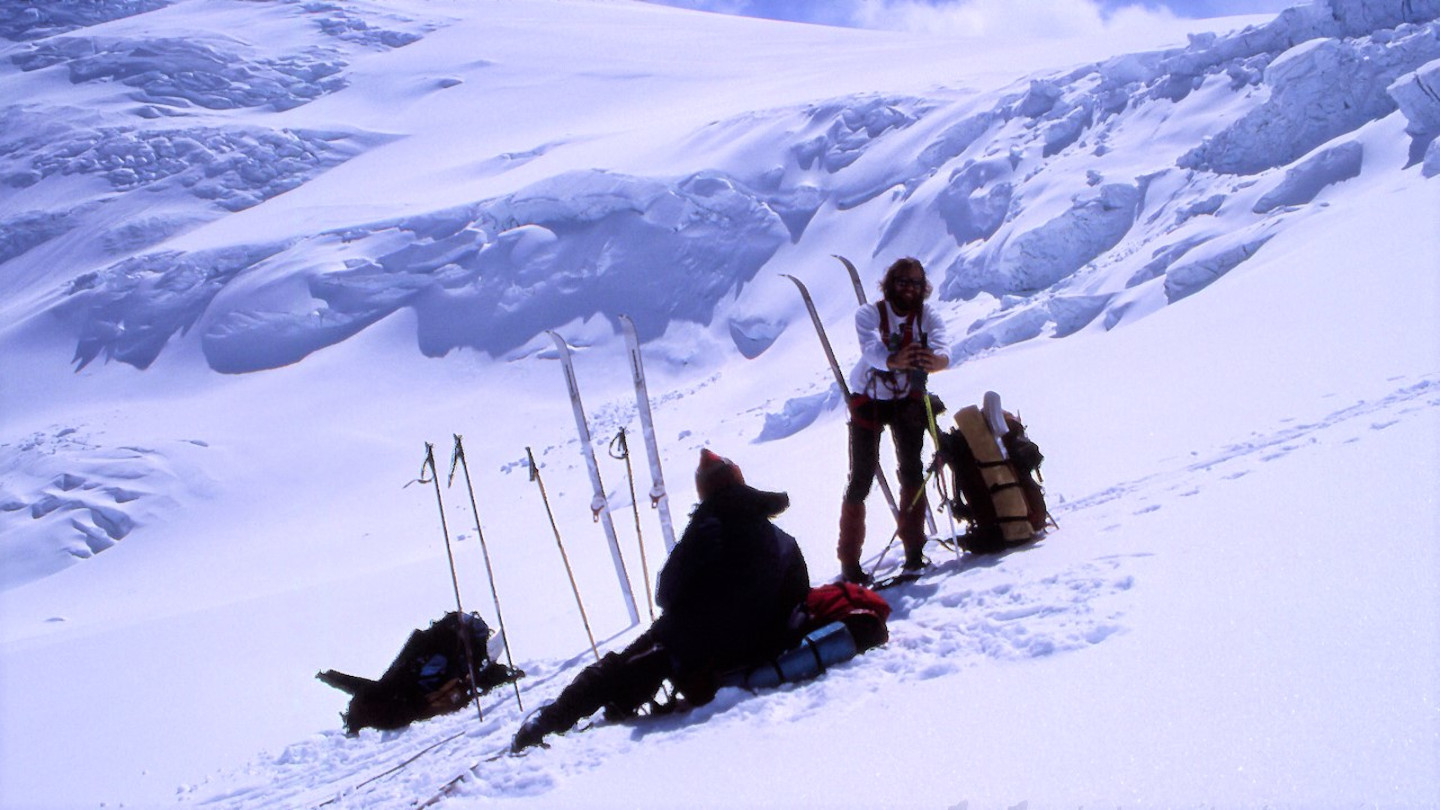
Athabasca Glacier headwall (on the ramp)

Close up image of Athabasca Glacier in 2025

Tourism of Athabasca Glacier in 2025
