= Mount Kitchener =

Mountain in Alberta, Canada

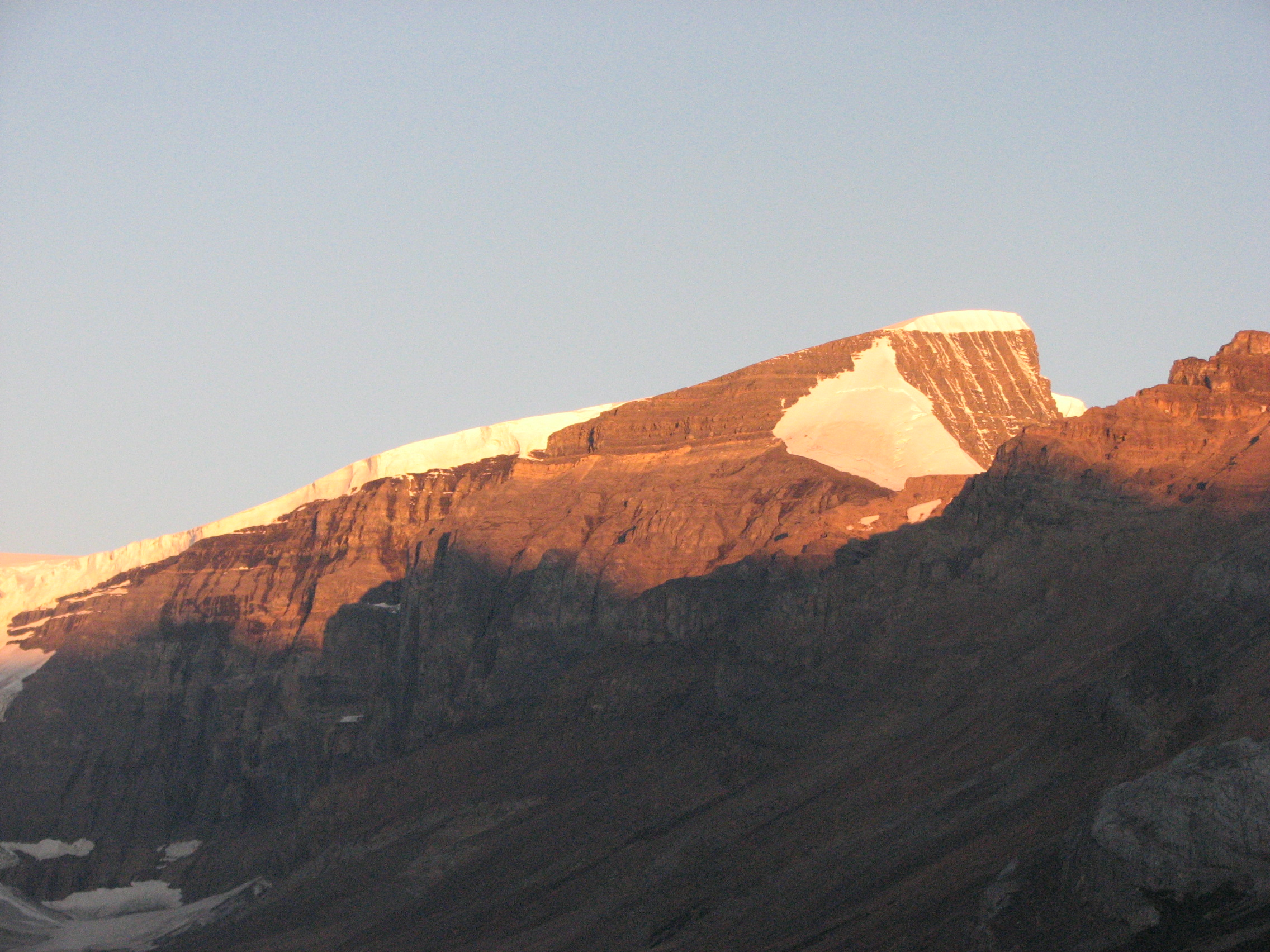
- Mt. Kitchener at dawn from the Icefields Parkway

Highest point
- Elevation: 3,505 m (11,499 ft)
- Prominence: 280 m (920 ft)
- Listing: Mountains of Alberta
- Coordinates: 52°12′58″N 117°19′15″W

Geography
- Location within Alberta
- Interactive map of Mount Kitchener
- Country: Canada
- Province: Alberta
- Parent range: Winston Churchill Range
- Topo map: NTS 83C3 Columbia Icefield

Climbing
- First ascent: 1927 by Alfred J. Ostheimer, guided by Hans Fuhrer
- Easiest route: rock/snow climb

Mount Kitchener is a mountain located within the Columbia Icefield of Jasper National Park, which is part of the Canadian Rockies. The mountain can be seen from the Icefields Parkway (highway 93) near Sunwapta Pass.

Mt. Kitchener was originally named Mount Douglas by J. Norman Collie after David Douglas. In 1916, the mountain was renamed Mount Kitchener, its present-day name, after Lord Kitchener, who had just been killed in World War I.

== Climbing ==
Routes

- SouthWest Slopes (Normal Route) I
- Grand Central Couloir V 5.9
- Ramp Route V 5.8

Notable ascents

- 1975 Grand Central Couloir (V 5.9 WI5 1050m) by Jeff Lowe and Michael Weis (August 1975)

== Mount K2 ==
Mount K2, elevation 3,090m, was named in 1938 by Rex Gibson (former Alpine Club of Canada president), apparently to signify this as a secondary peak of Mount Kitchener.

== Climate ==
Based on the Köppen climate classification, Mount Kitchener is located in a subarctic climate zone with cold, snowy winters, and mild summers. Temperatures can drop below −20 °C (−4 °F) with wind chill factors below −30 °C (−22 °F).

== Gallery ==
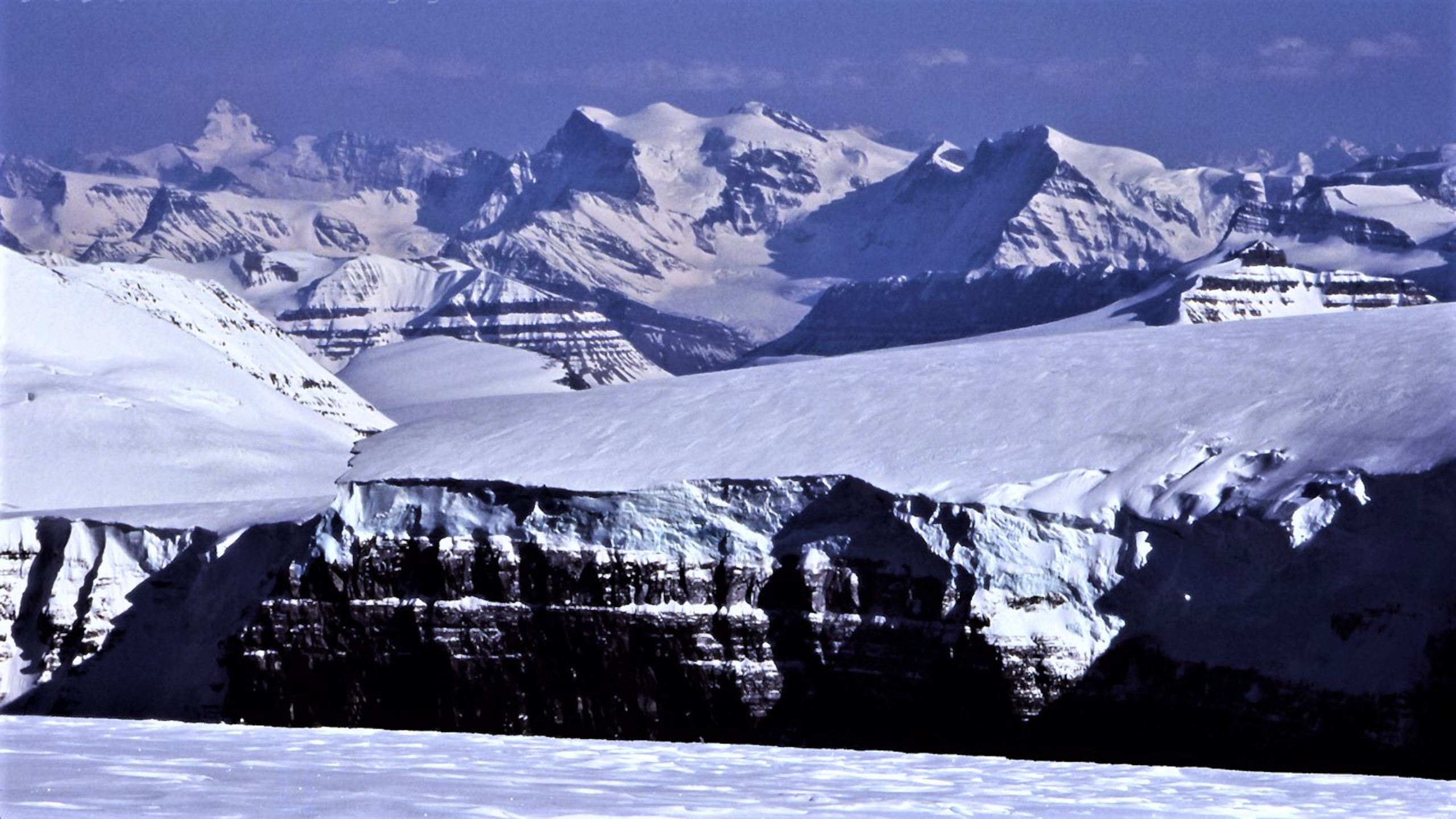
View from Mount Kitchener's summit

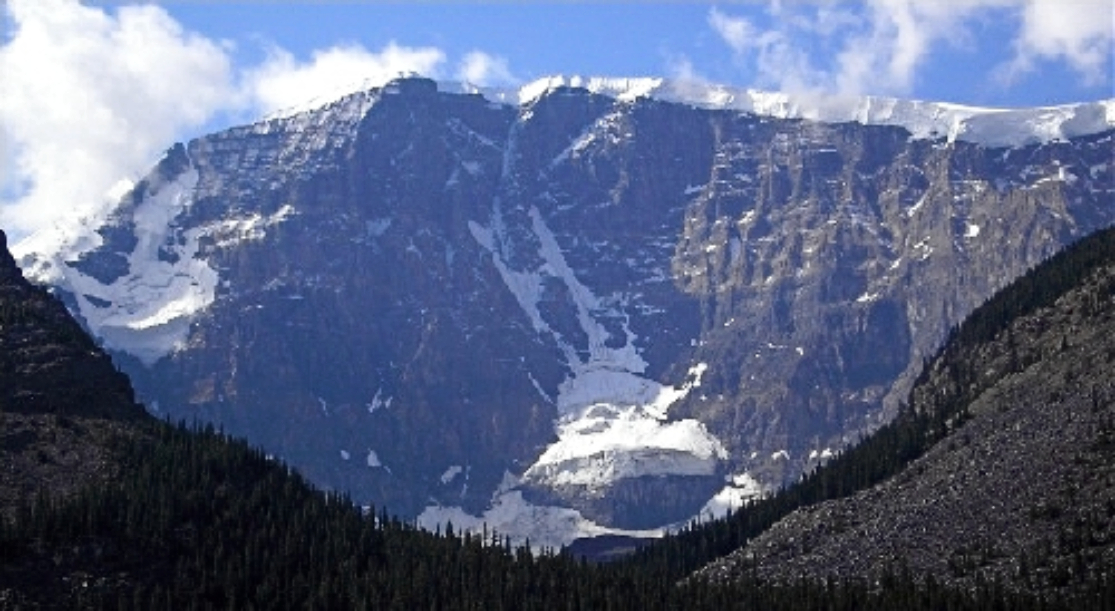
Mount Kitchener's north face

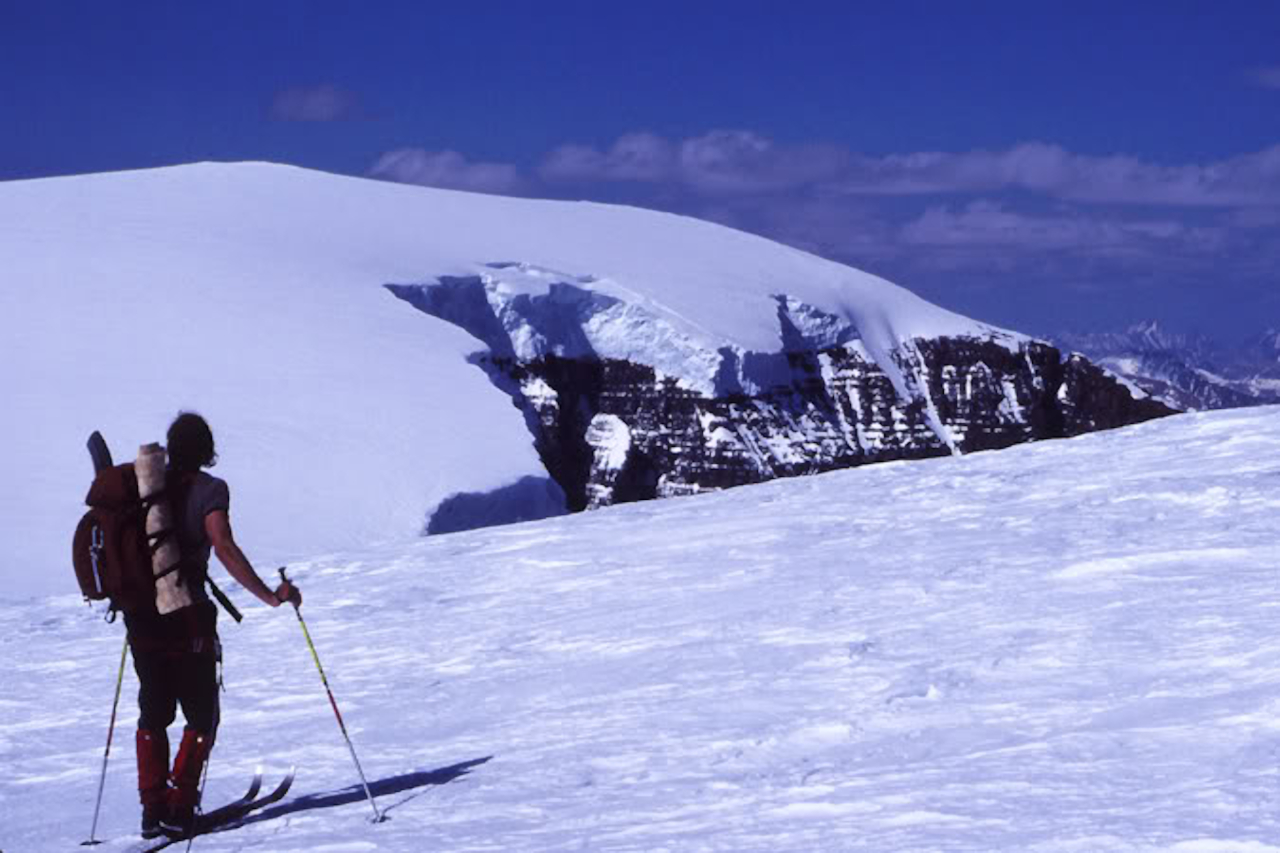
Mount Kitchener Summit from Snow Dome

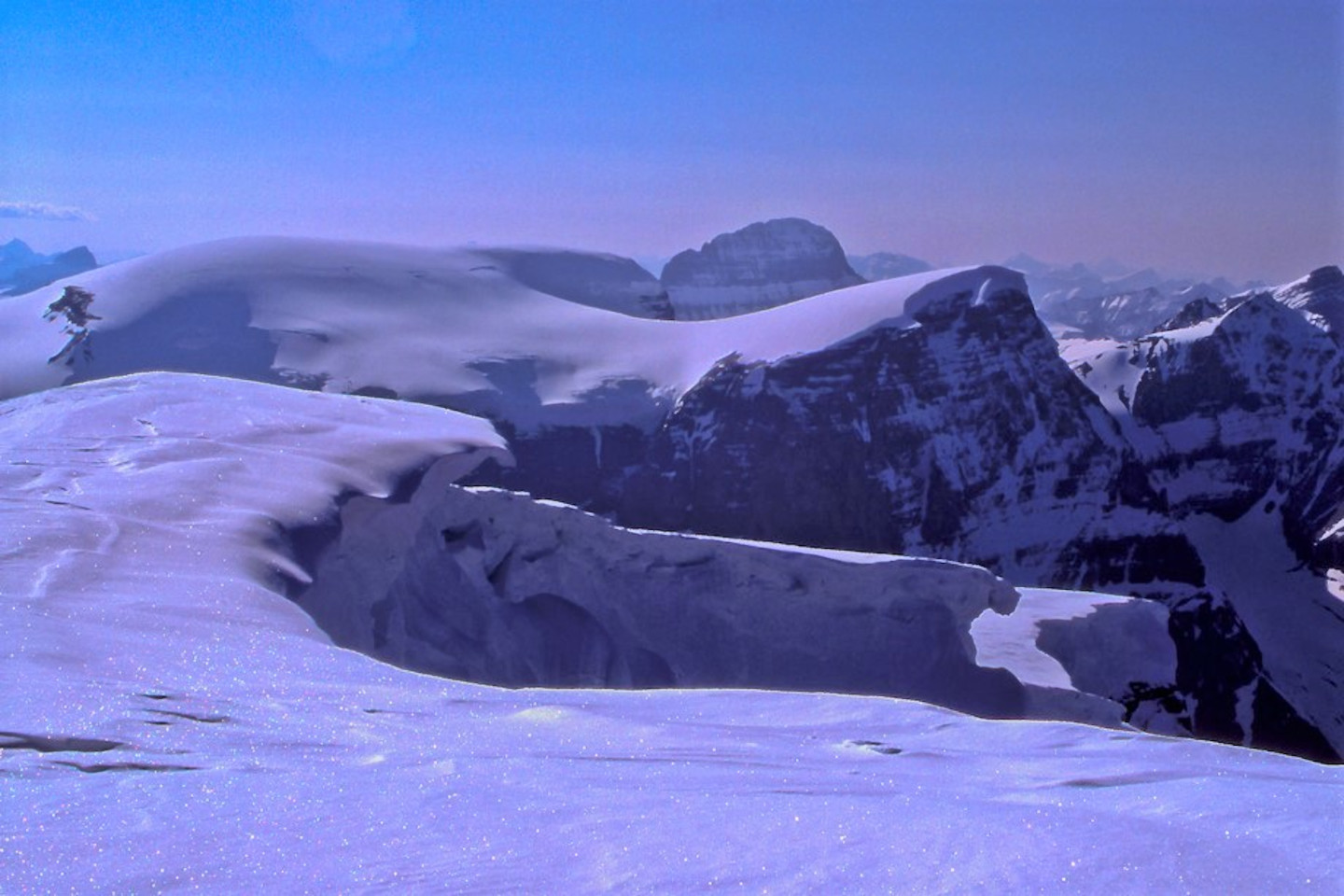
View to north from Mount Kitchener

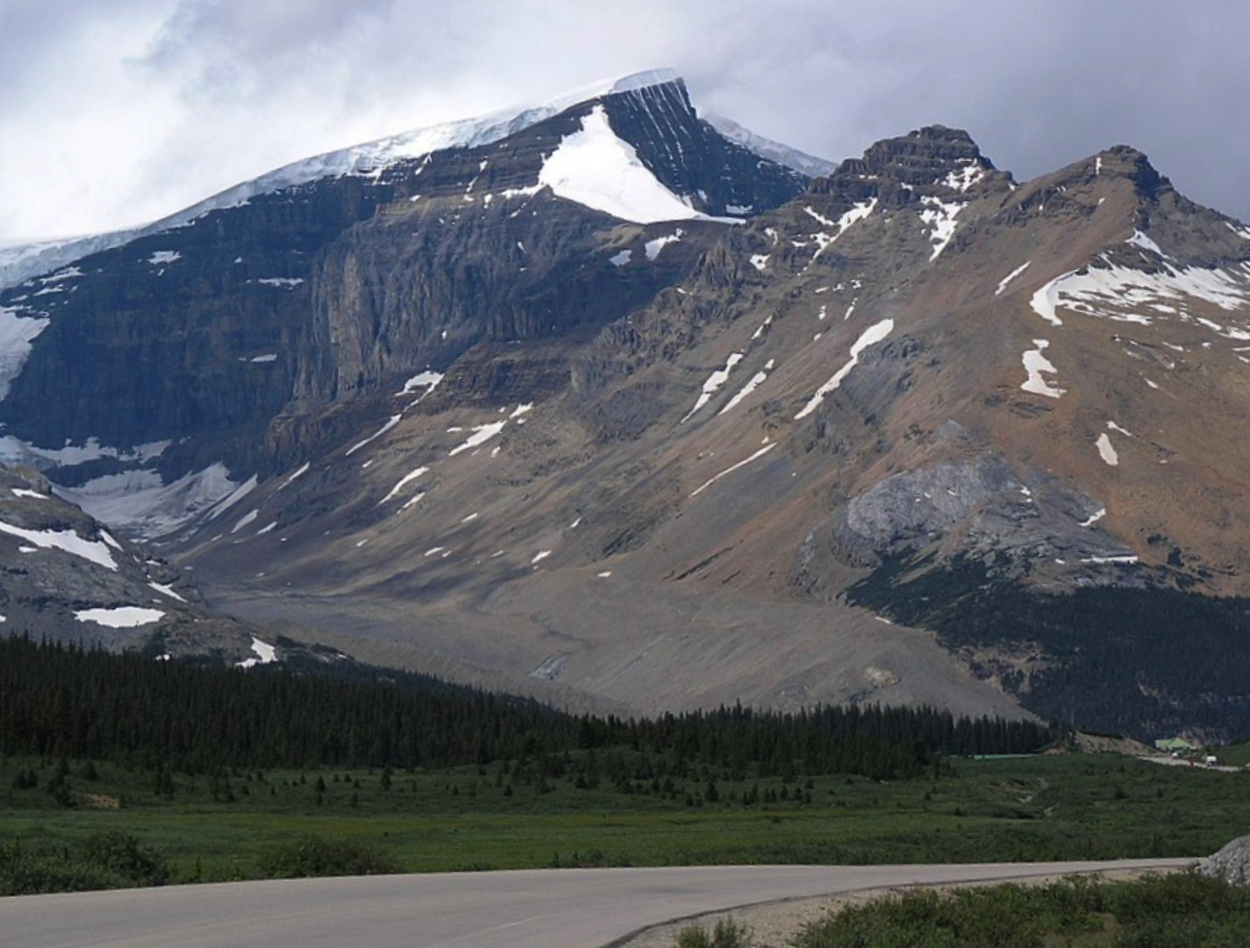
View of Mount Kitchener and Mount K2
