= Athabasca (1888 HBC vessel) =

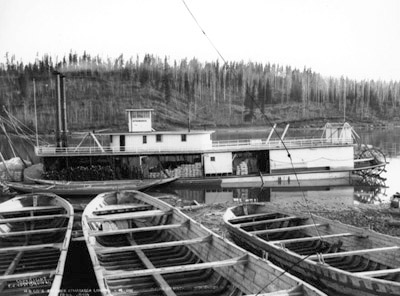
Athabasca at Athabasca Landing in 1896

Athabasca was a steampowered sternwheel riverboat, operated by the Hudson's Bay Company on a portion of the Athabasca River. She was built on the shores of the river in 1888, at Athabasca Landing, the end of a long portage from Edmonton.

She carried cargo from Athabasca Landing to the Grand Rapids from her launch in 1888 until 1897. In 1897 the decision was made to transport cargo downstream to the rapids in smaller unpowered scows, and she was used as a floating warehouse.
