= Mount Athabasca =

Mountain in Jasper National Park, Alberta, Canada

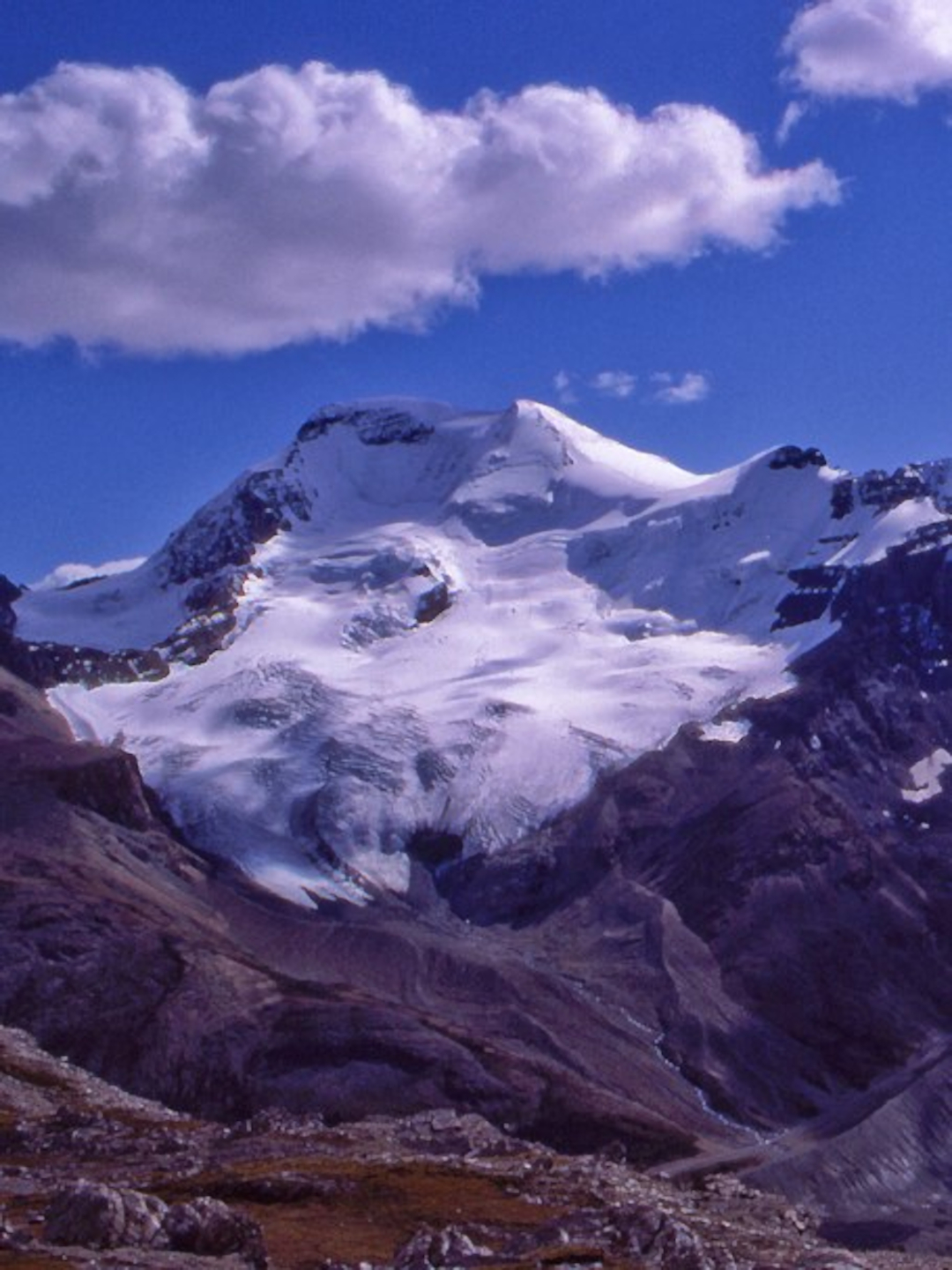
- Mount Athabasca and North Glacier seen from Wilcox Pass

Highest point
- Elevation: 3,491 m (11,453 ft)
- Prominence: 671 m (2,201 ft)
- Listing: Mountains of Alberta
- Coordinates: 52°10′50″N 117°12′06″W

Geography
- Location within Alberta
- Country: Canada
- Province: Alberta
- Protected area: Jasper National Park
- Parent range: Canadian Rockies
- Topo map: NTS 83C3 Columbia Icefield

Climbing
- First ascent: 1898 by J. Norman Collie and Herman Woolley
- Easiest route: Scramble, glacier, snow climb

Mount Athabasca is in the Columbia Icefield of Jasper National Park in Canada. The mountain was named in 1898 by J. Norman Collie, who made the first ascent on August 18 of that year. Athabasca is the Cree language name for "where there are reeds", which originally referred to Lake Athabasca. Mount Athabasca is unusual, in that water flows to the Pacific Ocean from the western slope, the Arctic Ocean from the northeastern slope, and to Hudson Bay from the southeastern slope.

== Routes ==
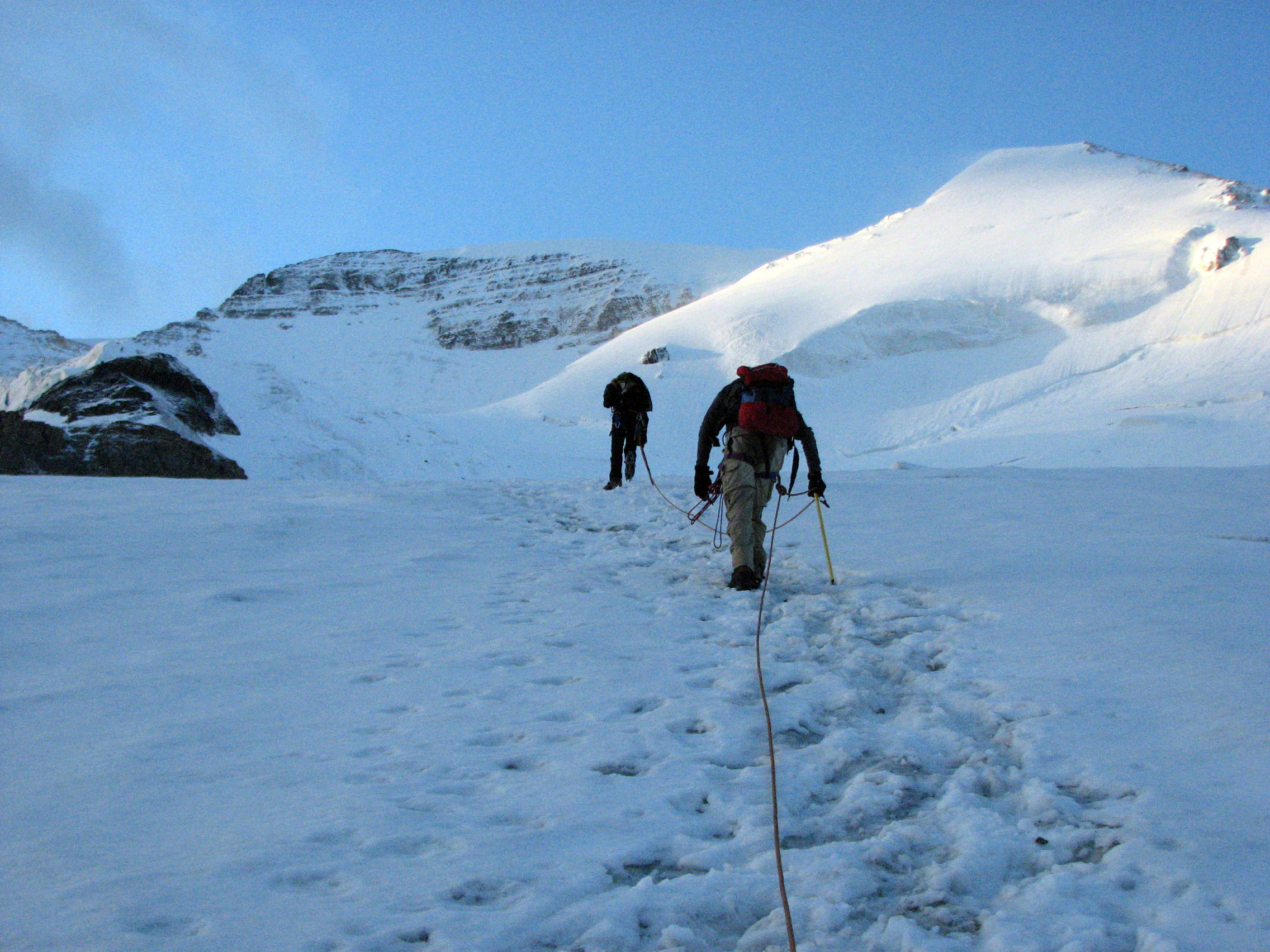
North Glacier route on Mount Athabasca

There are several climbing routes, including:

- North Glacier (Normal Route) II
- Silverhorn II
- AA Col II
- Regular North Face III 5.8
- North Ridge III 5.5
- The Hourglass 300m, III, AI3-4

One of the most prominent features of Mount Athabasca is a horned-shaped tip near the top called the "Silverhorn". The Silverhorn is one of the easier routes to the summit but requires more caution and ability than the normal route because of blue ice and falling ice from other parties. Although not apparent from the typical roadside view of the mountain, the south side of Silverhorn contains a scrambling route but one must still cross the north glacier to get to it. From the top of the Silverhorn, the summit is a rather easy 15-minute plod in good summer weather over the narrow snow-covered summit ridge.
