= Saskatchewan (disambiguation) =

Saskatchewan is one of Canada's provinces since 1905.

Saskatchewan (from the Cree language term kisiskāciwani-sīpiy, meaning "swift-flowing river"), may also refer to:

== Territorial divisions ==
- District of Saskatchewan, part of the Northwest Territories of Canada from 1882 to 1905, partly overlapping the current province of the same name
- Saskatchewan (Provisional District), a federal electoral district in the then-Northwest Territories

== Natural Features ==
- Saskatchewan River, a river in Saskatchewan and Manitoba, Canada
  - South Saskatchewan River, a river in Southern Alberta and Saskatchewan, Canada
  - North Saskatchewan River, a river in Central Alberta and Saskatchewan, Canada
- Saskatchewan Glacier, a glacier in Alberta, Canada
- Mount Saskatchewan (Yukon), a mountain
- Mount Saskatchewan (Alberta), another mountain

== Places ==
- Saskatchewan, Manitoba, a rural municipality in Manitoba, Canada
- Fort Saskatchewan, a city in Alberta, Canada

== Other ==
- Saskatchewan Party, ruling centre-right political party in the Canadian province of Saskatchewan
- University of Saskatchewan, a coeducational public research university located in Saskatoon
- Saskatchewan (film), 1954
- 45561 Saskatchewan, a British LMS Jubilee Class locomotive
- "Saskatchewan", a song by Les Trois Accords from the 2003 album Gros mammouth album
