= Parker Ridge =

Mountain ridge in Banff NP, Alberta, Canada

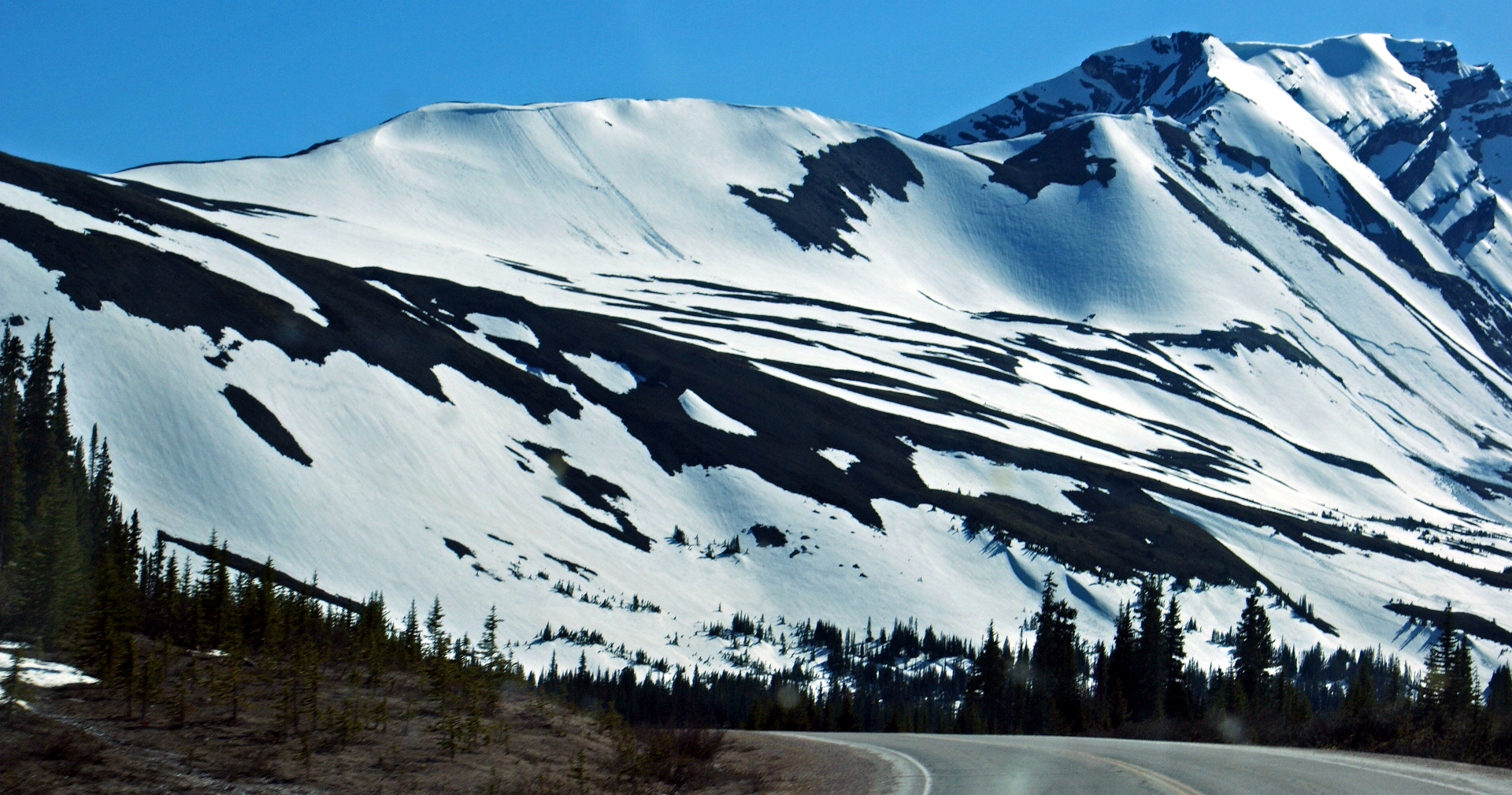
- Parker Ridge viewed from Icefields Parkway

Highest point
- Elevation: 2,255 m (7,398 ft)
- Prominence: 170 m (560 ft)
- Parent peak: Mount Athabasca (3491 m)
- Coordinates: 52°10′51″N 117°05′32″W

Geography
- Location within Alberta Location within Canada
- Interactive map of Parker Ridge
- Location: Alberta, Canada
- Parent range: Canadian Rockies
- Topo map: NTS 83C3 Columbia Icefield

Geology
- Rock type: Sedimentary

Climbing
- Easiest route: Hiking

Parker Ridge is a 2,255-metre (7,398-foot) mountain ridge in the upper North Saskatchewan River valley in Banff National Park, in the Alberta portion of the Canadian Rockies. Its nearest higher peak is Mount Athabasca, 7.7 km (4.8 mi) to the west. Parker Ridge lies along the west side of the Icefields Parkway and southeast of Sunwapta Pass. Parker Ridge is a ski-touring destination in the winter and a popular hiking destination in the summer because the Icefields Parkway allows easy access, and because it is nearly entirely above treeline, allowing good views of the surrounding mountain landscape. A 2.2 km (1.4 mi) trail gains 275 metres (900 ft) of elevation from the highway to the top of the ridge. Wandering east or west along the ridge provides views of Cirrus Mountain, the north face of Mount Saskatchewan, Saskatchewan Glacier, Mount Athabasca, Hilda Peak, and Nigel Peak among others.

== History ==
Parker Ridge was named for Elizabeth Parker (1856–1944), co-founder of the Alpine Club of Canada in 1906 along with Arthur Oliver Wheeler. The Elizabeth Parker hut near Lake O'Hara in Yoho National Park is also named in her honour.

The mountain's name was officially adopted in 1978 by the Geographical Names Board of Canada.

== Geology ==
Like other mountains in Banff Park, Parker Ridge is composed of sedimentary rock laid down from the Precambrian to Jurassic periods. Formed in shallow seas, this sedimentary rock was pushed east and over the top of younger rock during the Laramide orogeny.

== Climate ==
Based on the Köppen climate classification, Parker Ridge is in a subarctic climate with cold, snowy winters, and mild summers. Temperatures can drop below −20 °C with wind chill index below −30. Precipitation runoff from Parker Ridge drains into tributaries of the North Saskatchewan River.

== Gallery ==
Views from Parker Ridge

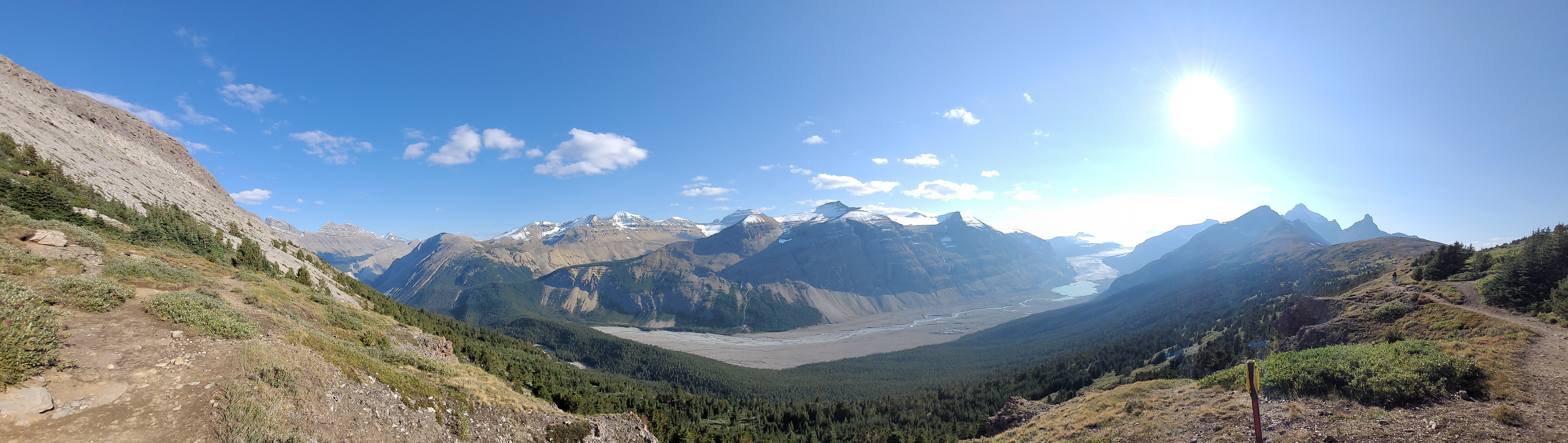
View at the end of the Parker Ridge Trail in Alberta (2021)

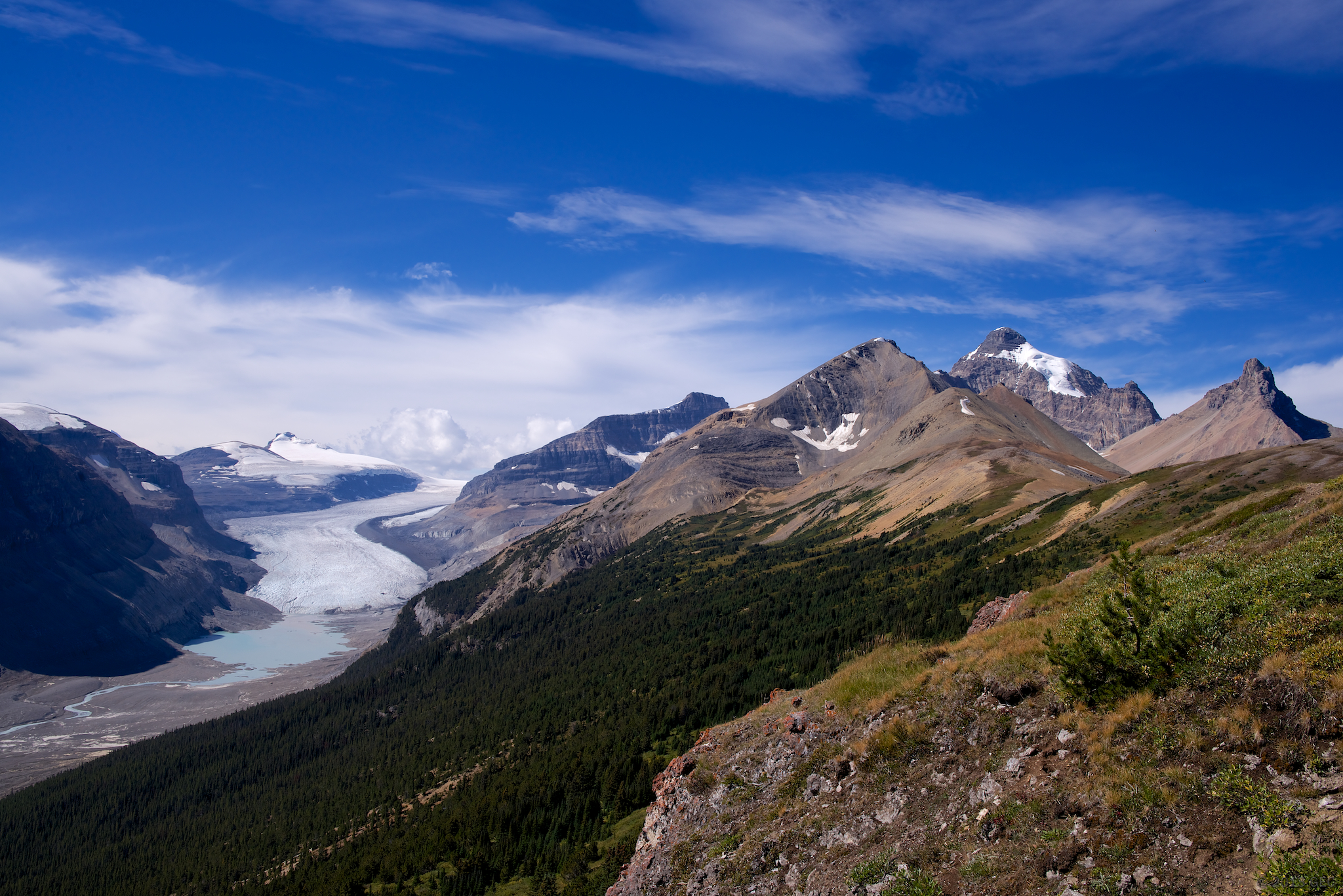
Castleguard Mountain, Saskatchewan Glacier, Mount Athabasca, Hilda Peak

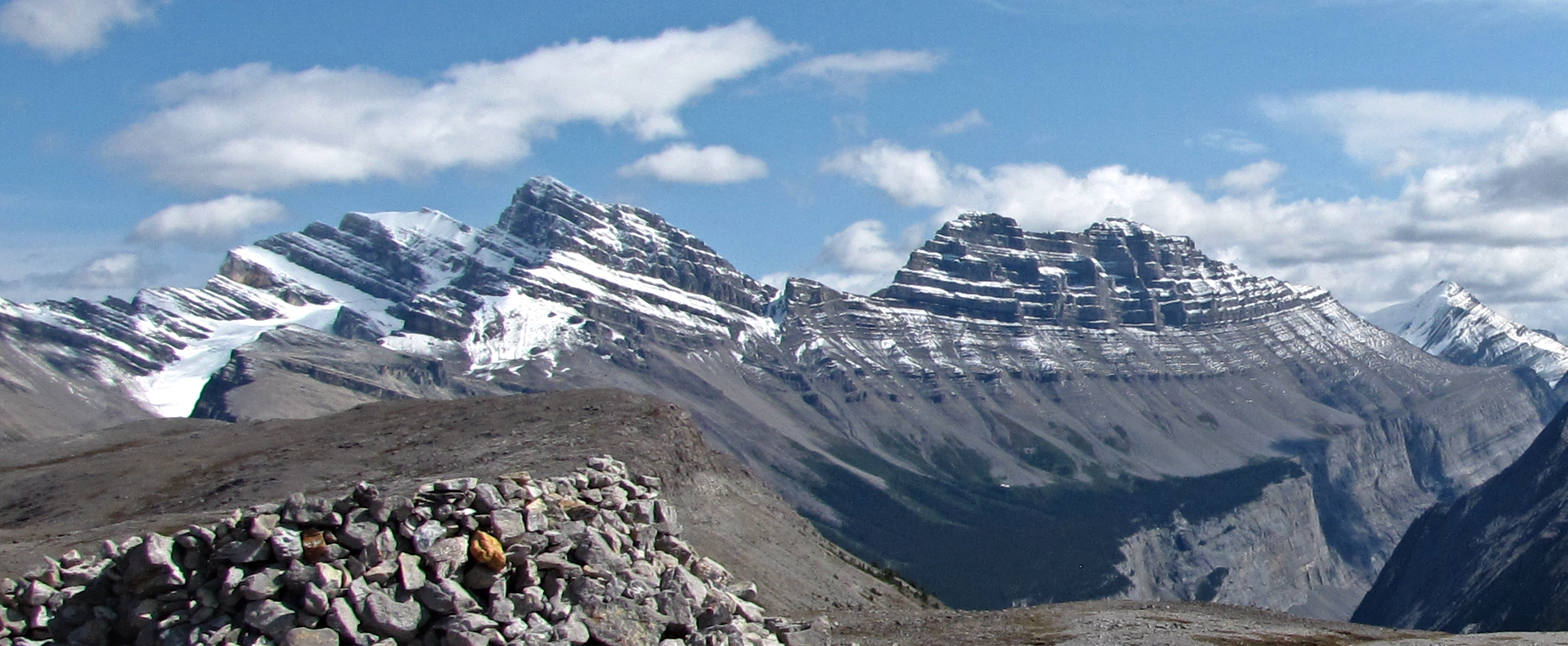
Cirrus Mountain from Parker Ridge

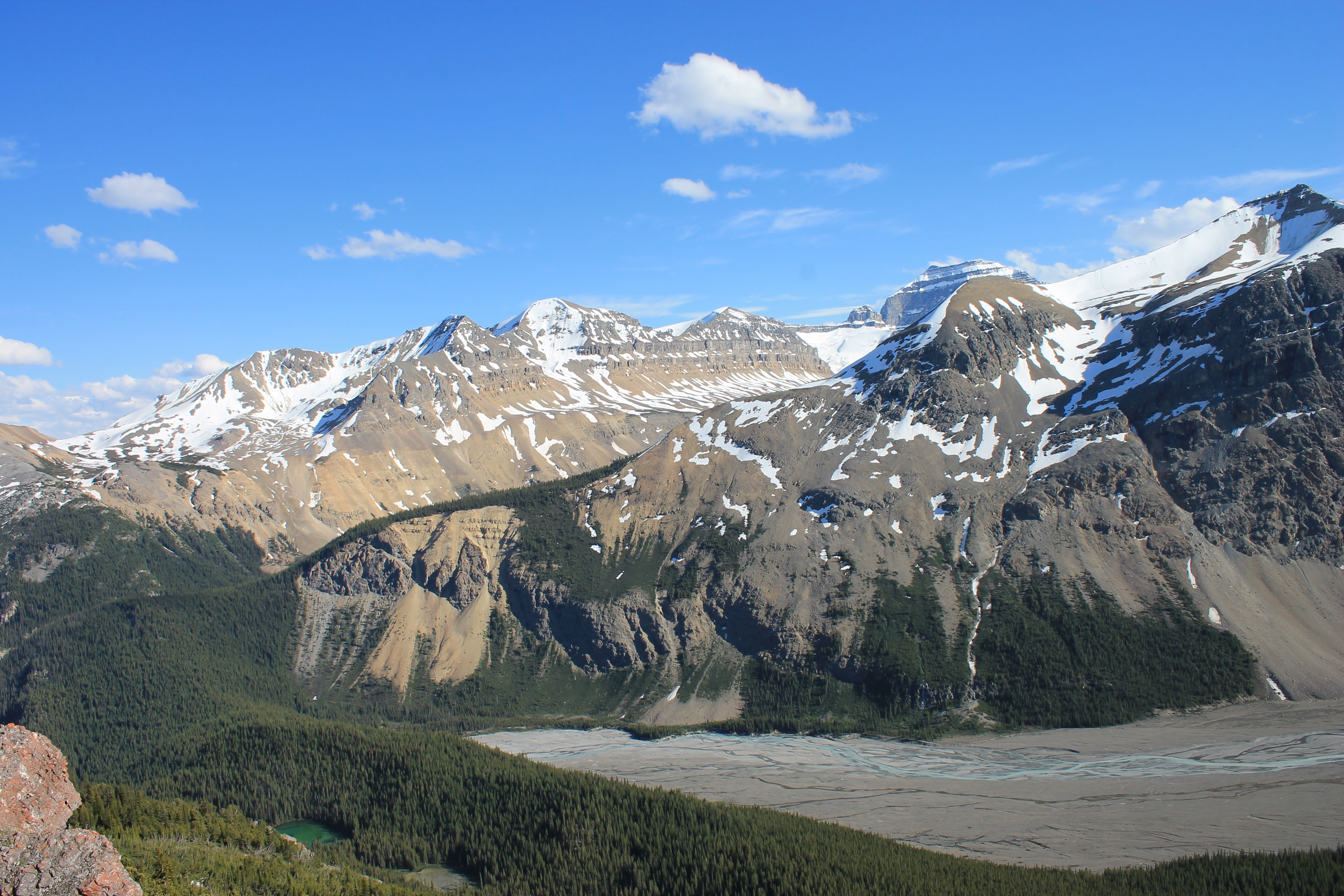
Overlooking North Saskatchewan River

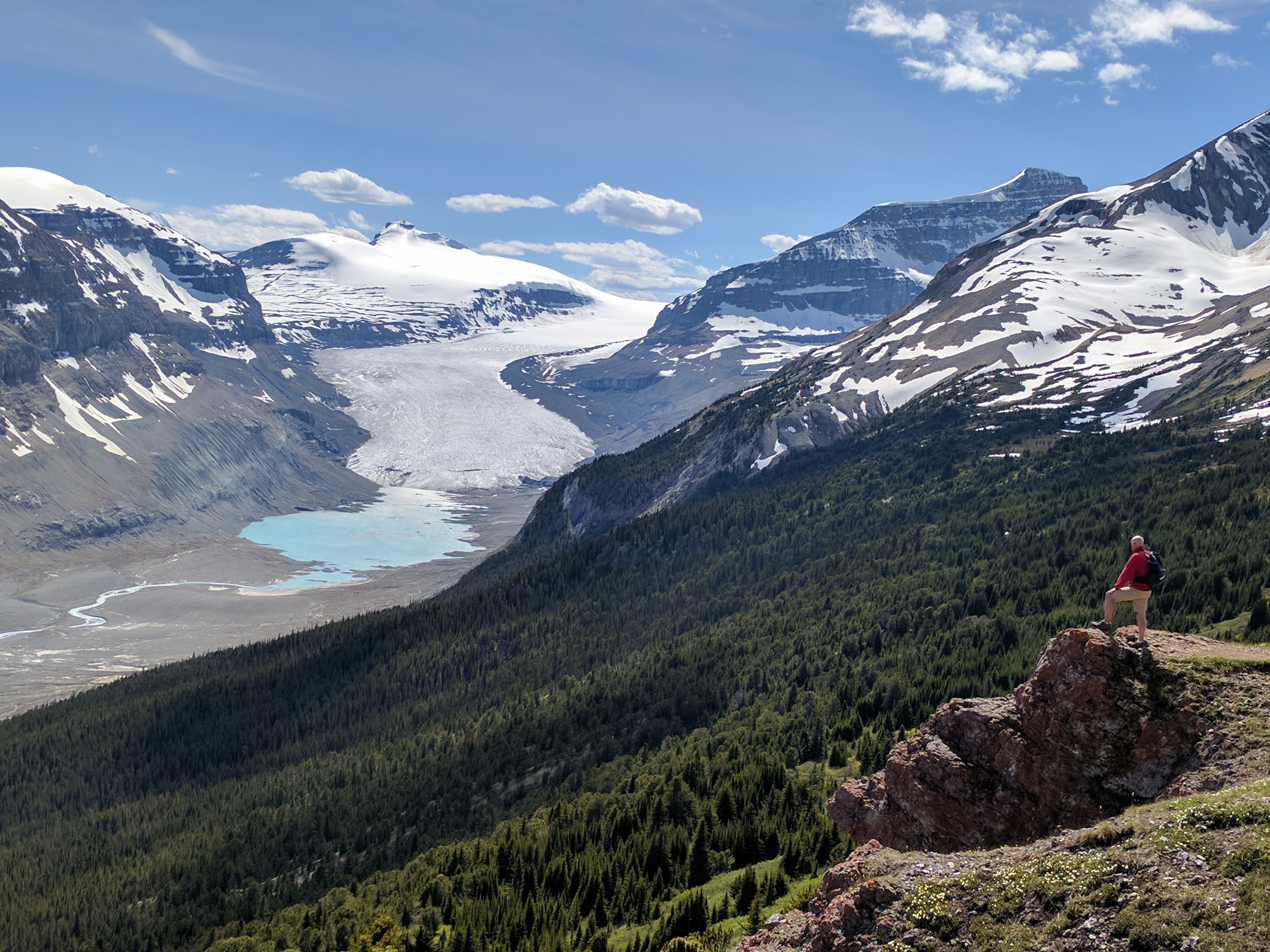
Saskatchewan Glacier and Castleguard Mountain

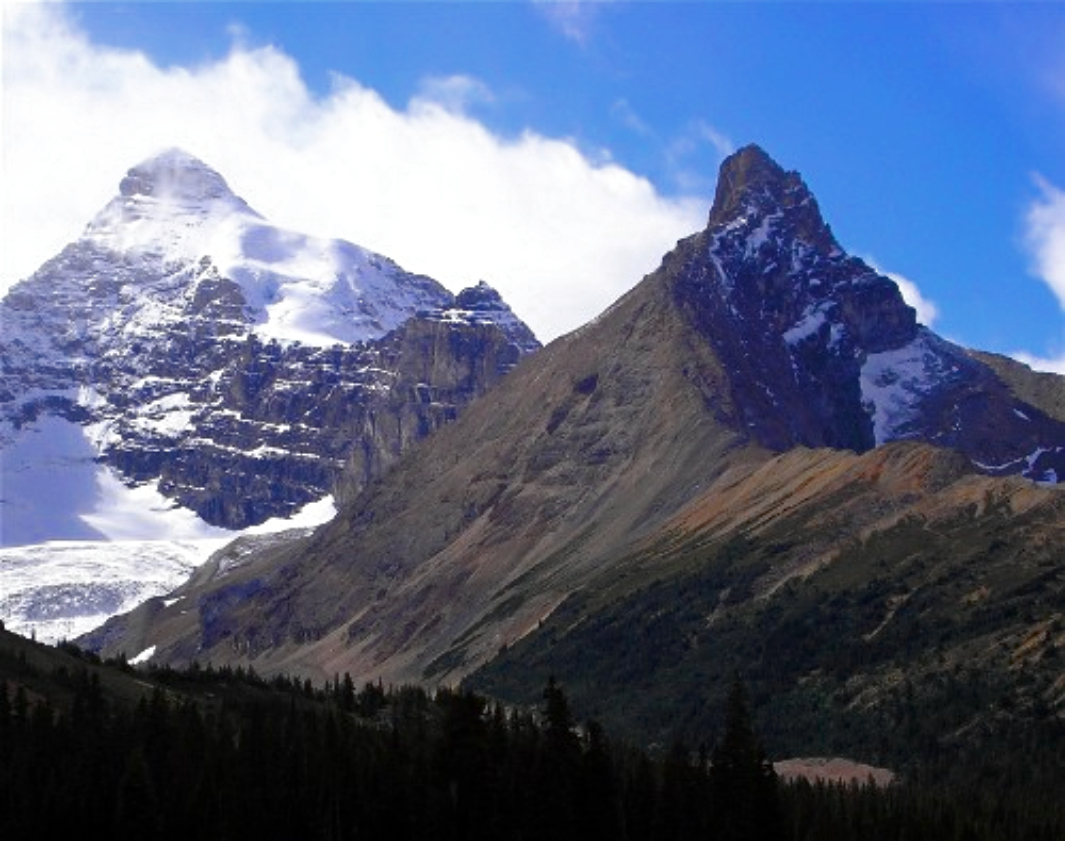
Mount Athabasca and Hilda Peak from Parker Ridge trail

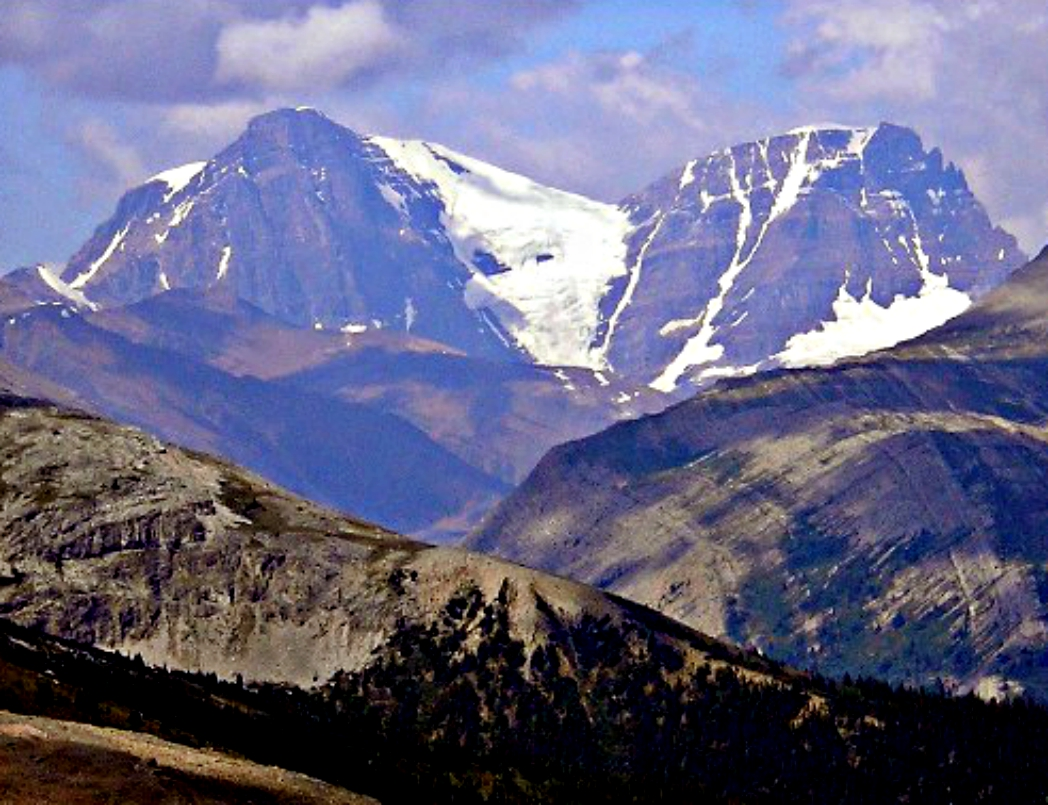
Mount Woolley and Diadem Peak in the distance

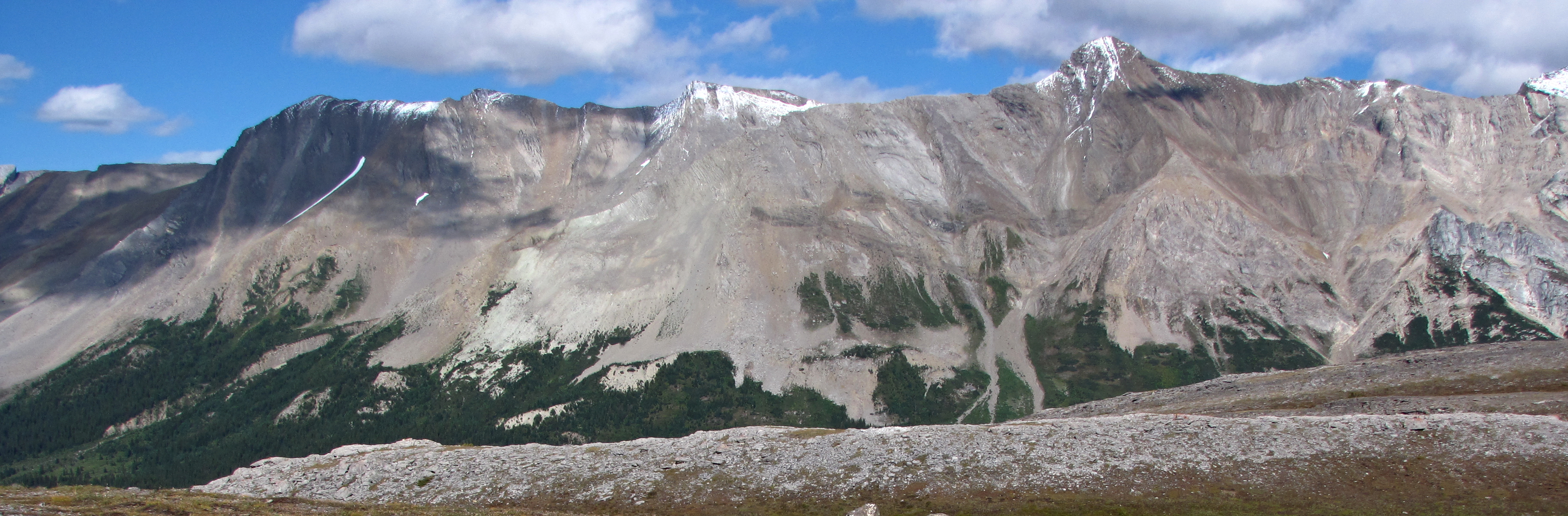
Looking east at unnamed ridge

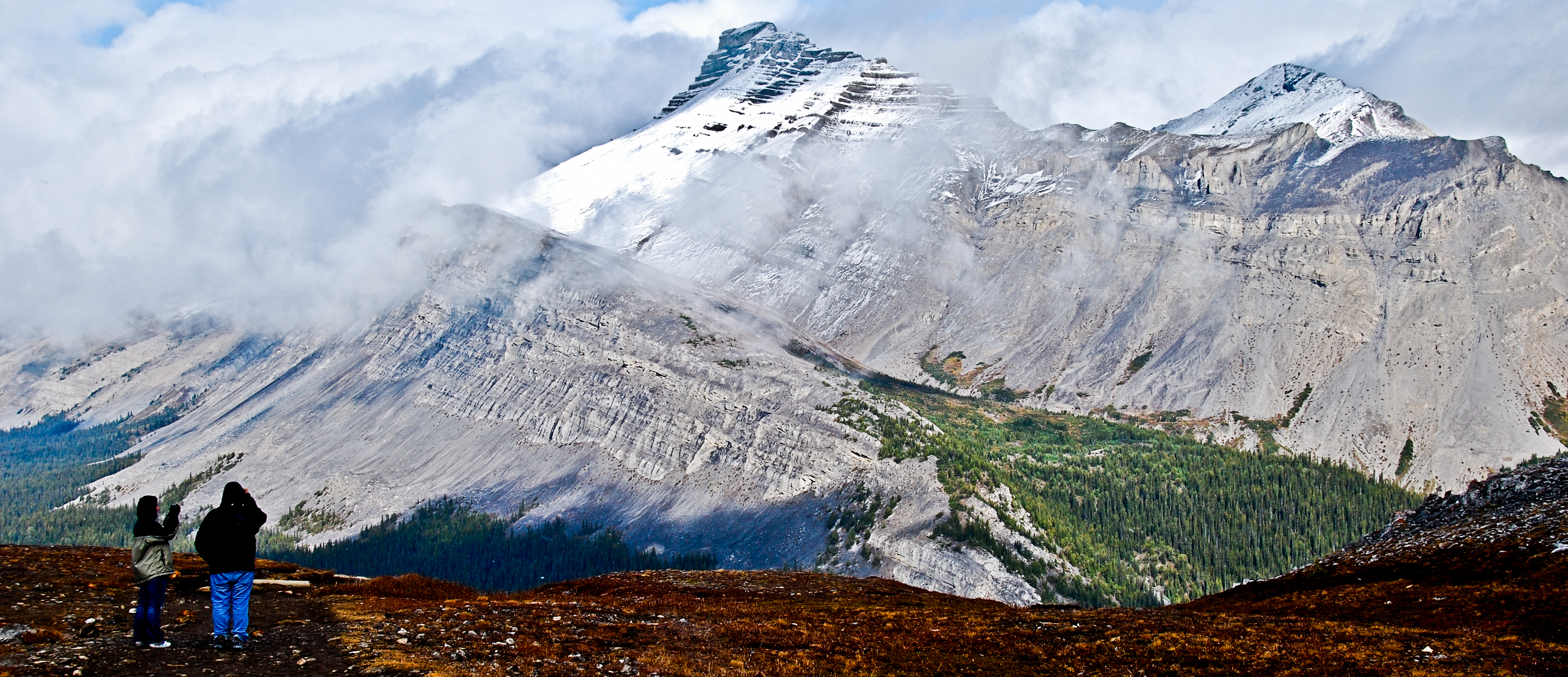
View from Parker Ridge of Nigel Peak's outliers

== See also ==
- The Canadian Rockies Trail Guide
- List of mountains of Canada
- Geography of Alberta
