= Mount Saskatchewan =

Mount Saskatchewan may refer to two mountains in Canada:

- Mount Saskatchewan (Alberta) in Banff National Park, Alberta
- Mount Saskatchewan (Yukon) in Kluane National Park and Reserve, Yukon
