= Hilda Peak =

Mountain peak in Banff NP, Alberta, Canada

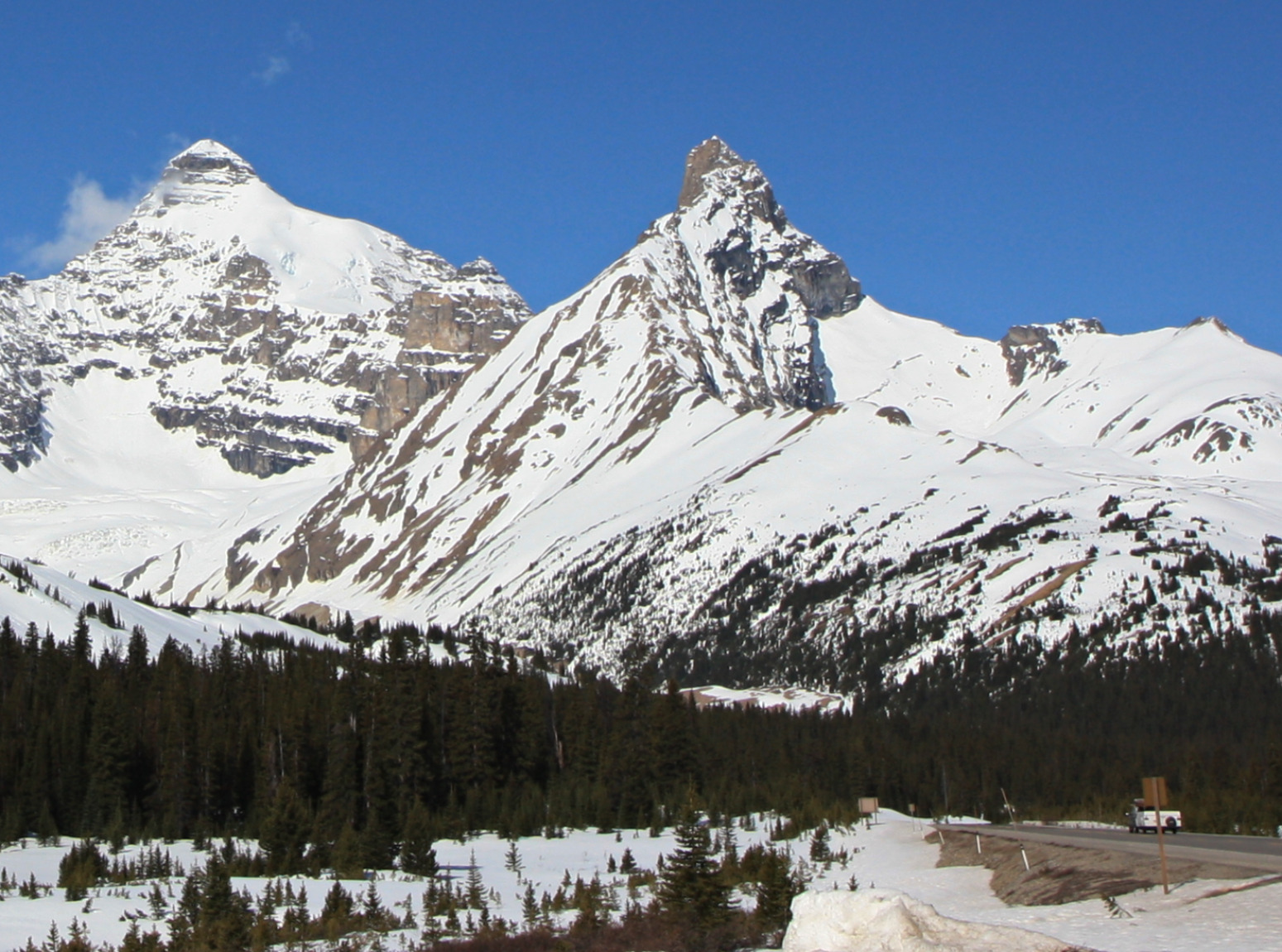
- Hilda Peak (center) with Mount Athabasca (left)

Highest point
- Elevation: 3,058 m (10,033 ft)
- Prominence: 238 m (781 ft)
- Parent peak: Mount Athabasca (3491 m)
- Listing: Mountains of Alberta
- Coordinates: 52°14′22″N 117°10′39″W

Geography
- Location within Alberta Location within Canada
- Interactive map of Hilda Peak
- Location: Alberta, Canada
- Parent range: Canadian Rockies
- Topo map: NTS 83C3 Columbia Icefield

Climbing
- First ascent: 1938 E. Brooks, H. Brooks, R. Cross, W. Marples
- Easiest route: Scramble

Hilda Peak is a 3,058-metre (10,033-foot) mountain summit located at the northern extreme of Banff National Park in the Canadian Rockies of Alberta, Canada. The nearest higher peak is Mount Athabasca, 2.0 km (1.2 mi) to the southwest. Hilda Peak is situated south of Sunwapta Pass and can be prominently seen from the Icefields Parkway. The Hilda Glacier lies to the south side of the peak, and the Boundary Glacier lies to the west.

== History ==
The first ascent of the mountain was made in 1938 by E. Brooks, H. Brooks, R. Cross, and W. Marples. The mountain was named Hilda Peak in 1938.

The mountain's name was officially adopted in 1985 when approved by the Geographical Names Board of Canada.

== Geology ==
Like other mountains in Banff Park, Hilda Peak is composed of sedimentary rock laid down from the Precambrian to Jurassic periods. Formed in shallow seas, this sedimentary rock was pushed east and over the top of younger rock during the Laramide orogeny.

== Climate ==
Based on the Köppen climate classification, Hilda Peak is located in a subarctic climate with cold, snowy winters, and mild summers. Winter temperatures can drop below -20 °C with wind chill factors below -30 °C. Precipitation runoff from Hilda Peak drains east into Hilda Creek, thence Nigel Creek, tributaries of the North Saskatchewan River.

== Gallery ==
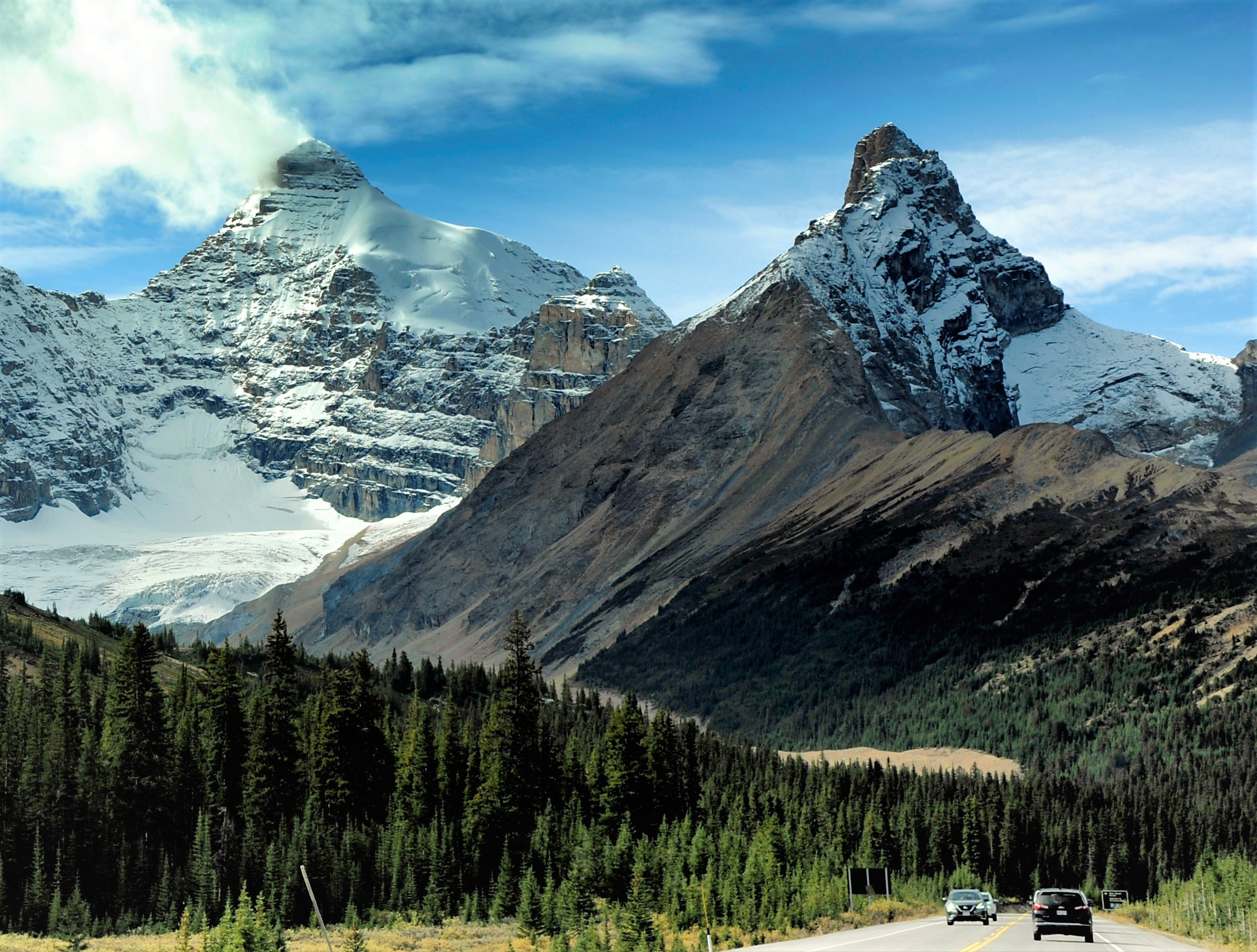
Hilda (right) with Mt. Athabasca (left)

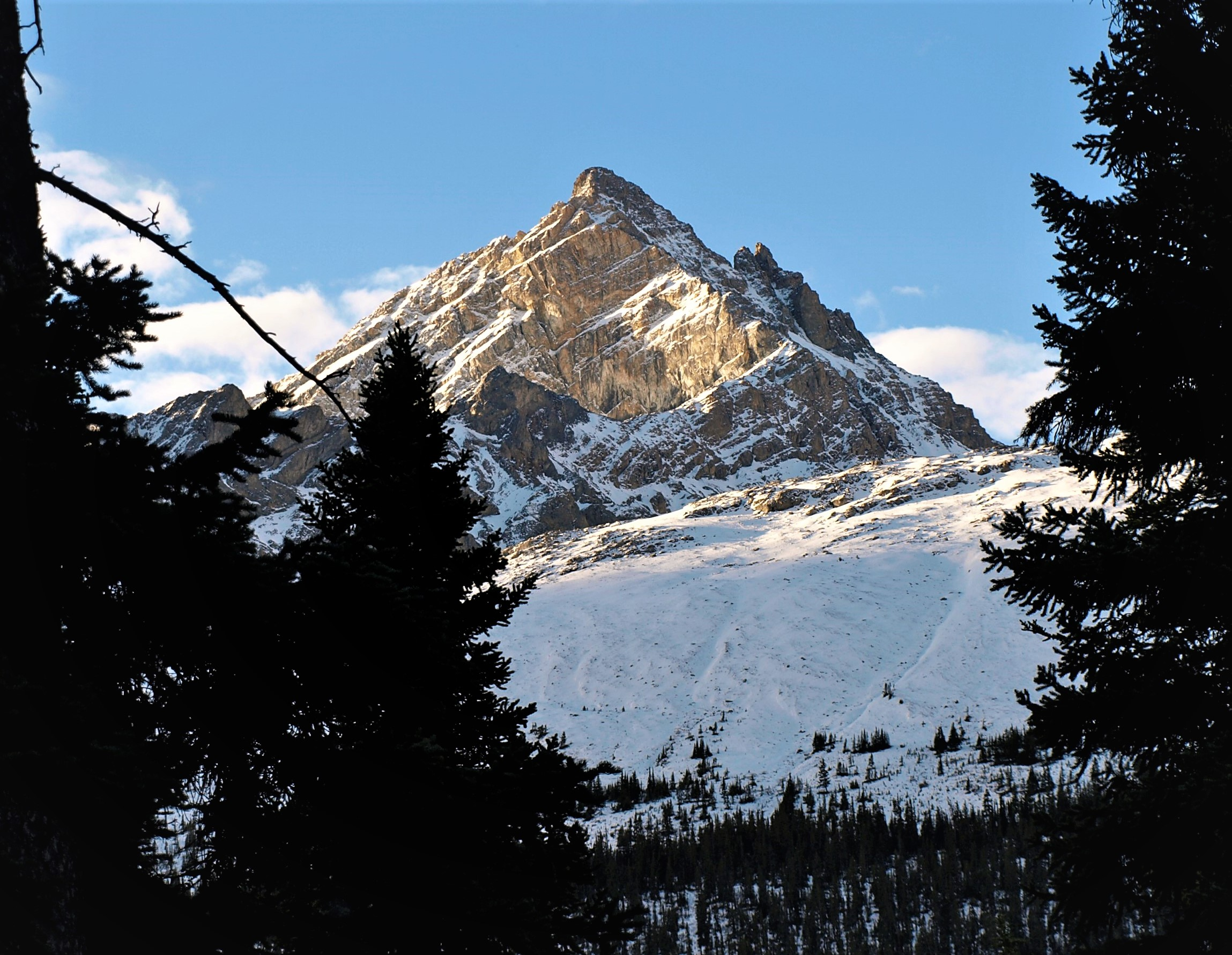
North aspect

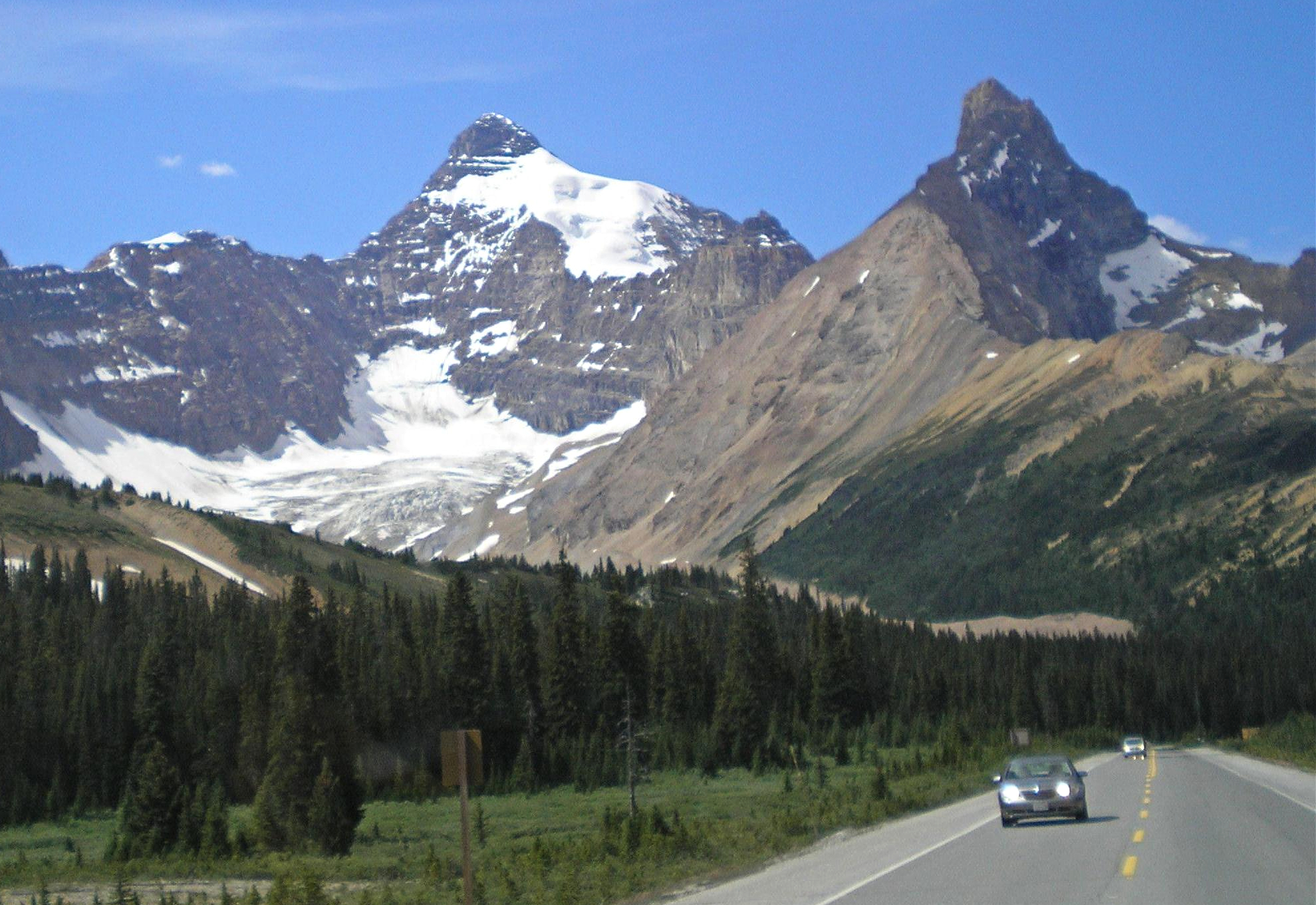
Hilda (right) seen from the Icefields Parkway

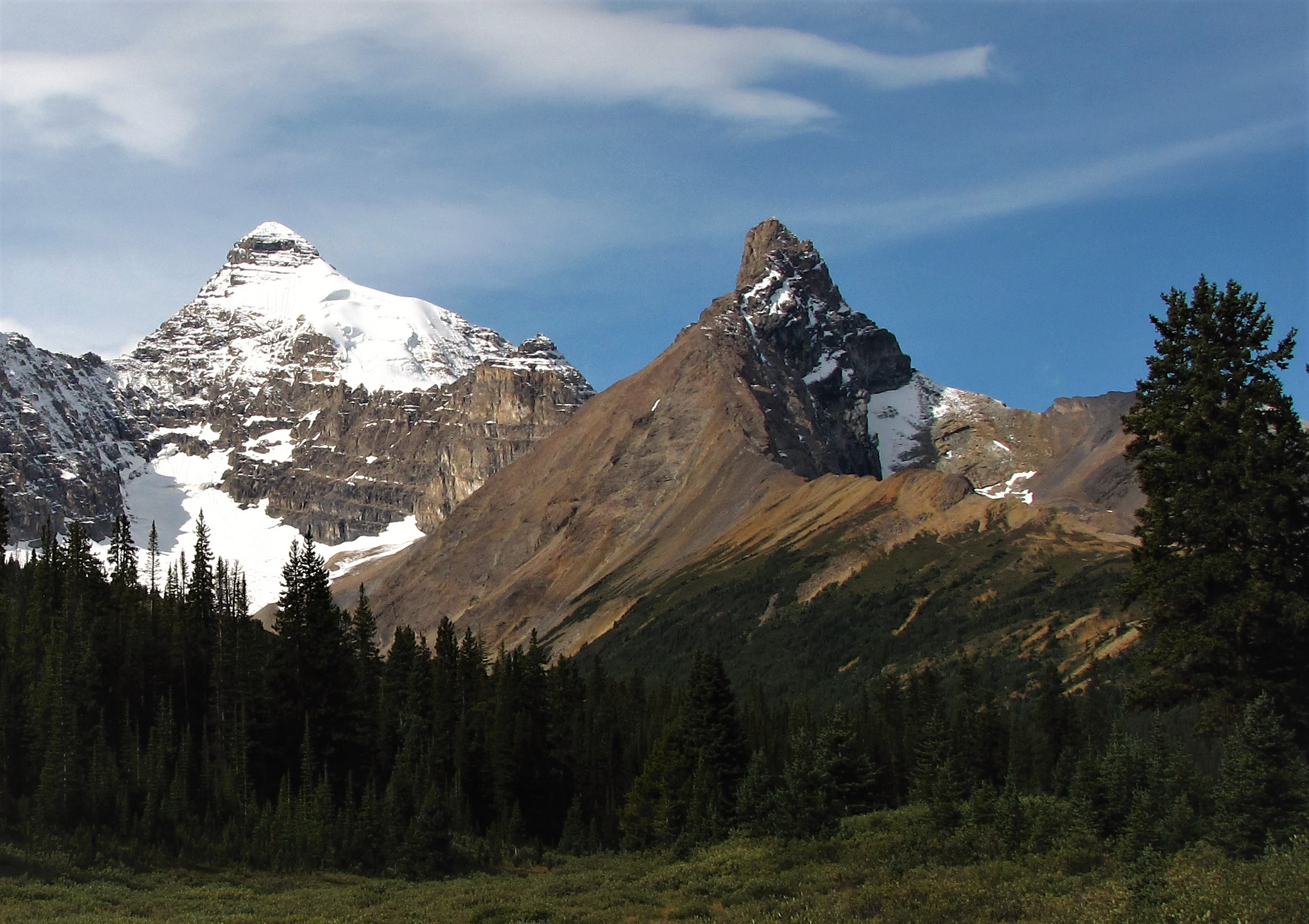
Mt. Athabasca (left) and Hilda Peak (right)

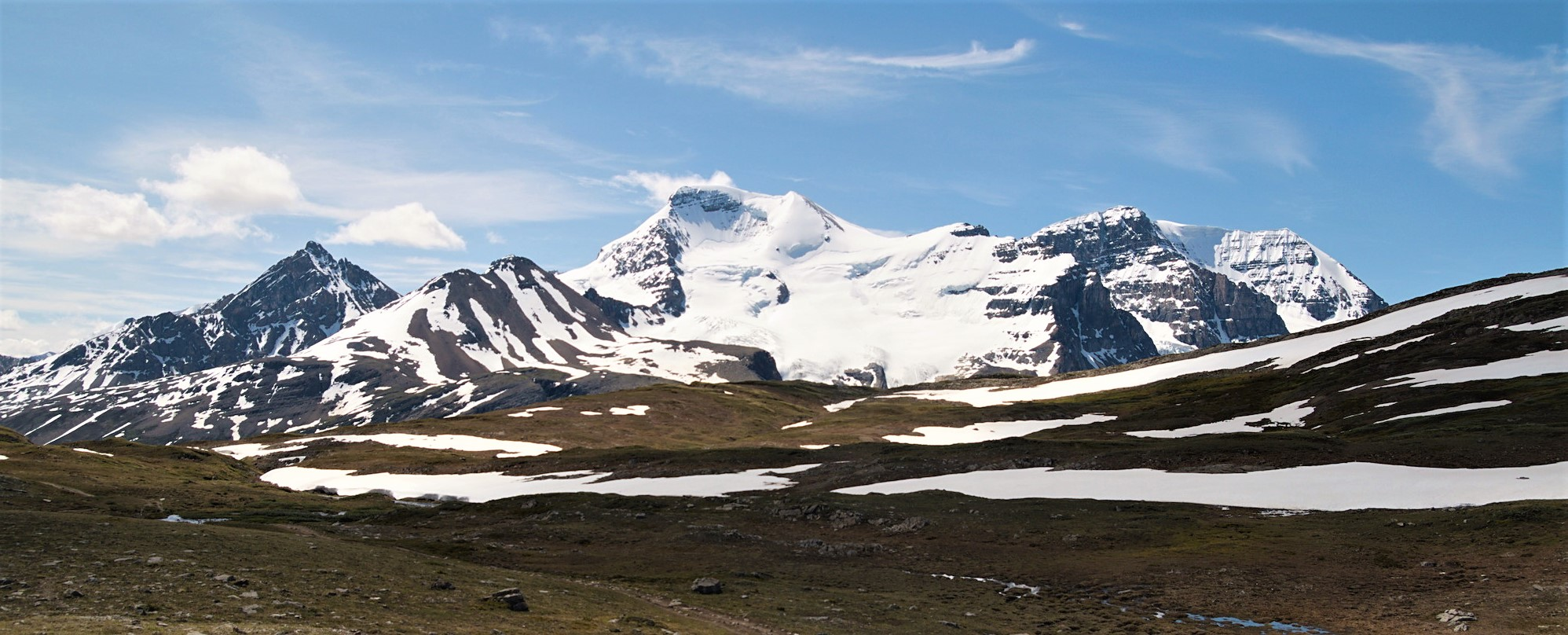
Hilda Peak (left), Mt. Athabasca (center), Mt. Andromeda (right) from the north

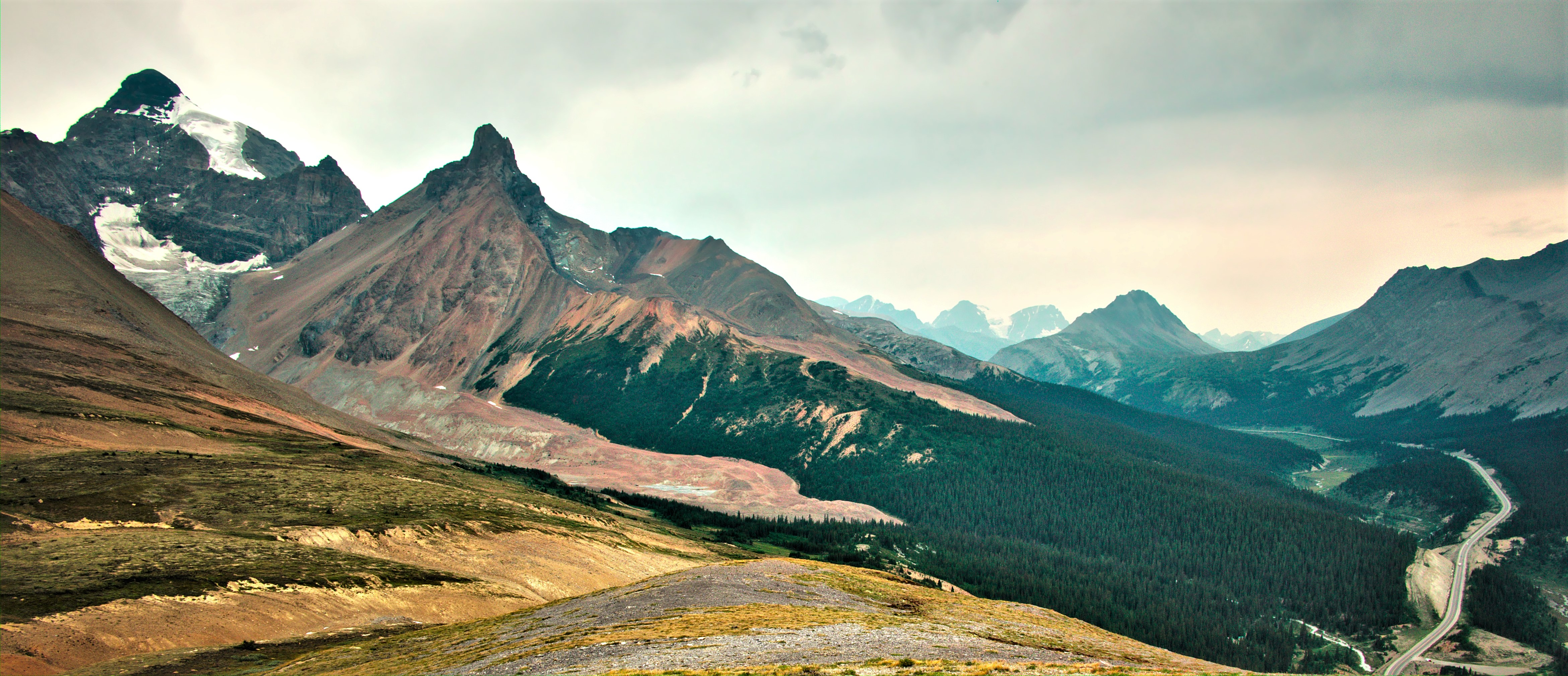
View from Parker Ridge showing Mount Athabasca (left edge), Hilda Peak, Sunwapta Pass and Icefields Parkway.

== See also ==
- List of mountains of Canada
- Geography of Alberta
