= Centennial Peak =

Centennial Peak may refer to:

- Centennial Peak (Antarctica)
- Centennial Peak (Colorado)
- Centennial Peak (Yukon), the highest peak in the Centennial Range

== See also ==
- Centennial Range
