= Dans mon corps =

Studio album by Les Trois Accords
- Released: October 13, 2009
- Genre: Pop rock
- Length: 41:04
- Labels: Phonoscope Productions and Disques Indica
- Producer: Gus Van Go

Les Trois Accords chronology
Grand champion international de course (2006)	Dans mon corps (2009)	J'aime ta grand-mère (2012)

Dans mon corps is the third studio album by Québécois Pop rock group Les Trois Accords released October 13, 2009.

== Track listing ==
1. "Dans mon corps" - 3:10
2. "Ton pantalon est plein" - 3:02
3. "Caméra vidéo" - 3:58
4. "Elle s'appelait Serge" - 2:50
5. "Nuit de la poésie" - 3:31
6. "Le bureau du médecin" - 3:35
7. "Pull pastel" - 4:31
8. "Pas capable d'arrêter" - 2:52
9. "La lune" - 4:03
10. "Croquer des cous" - 6:00
11. "Club optimiste" - 3:30
