= Joie d'être gai =

Studio album by Les Trois Accords
- Released: November 20, 2015
- Genre: Pop rock
- Length: 36:19
- Label: La Tribu

Les Trois Accords chronology
J'aime ta grand-mère (2012)	Joie d'être gai (2015)	Beaucoup de plaisir (2018)

Joie d'être gai is the fifth studio album by Québécois Pop rock band Les Trois Accords released November 20, 2015. The album was recorded in New York City.

== Track listing ==
1. "Joie d'être gai" - 4:12
2. "Dans le coin" - 3:04
3. "J'épile ton nom" - 3:25
4. "Les dauphins et les licornes" - 5:15
5. "St-Bruno (Nuit de la poésie III)" - 4:29
6. "Top bronzés" - 3:18
7. "J'ai un massage pour toi" - 2:39
8. "Non, toi raccroche" - 3:25
9. "L'esthéticienne" - 3:30
10. "C'est pas facial" - 3:02
