= J'aime ta grand-mère =

Studio album by Les Trois Accords
- Released: October 23, 2012
- Genre: Pop rock
- Length: 35:36
- Label: La Tribu

Les Trois Accords chronology
Dans mon corps (2009)	J'aime ta grand-mère (2012)	Joie d'être gai (2015)

J'aime ta grand-mère is the fourth studio album by Québécois Pop rock band Les Trois Accords released October 23, 2012.

== Track listing ==
1. "Personne préférée" - 3:29
2. "Les amoureux qui s'aiment" - 3:31
3. "J'aime ta grand-mère" - 3:53
4. "Bamboula" - 3:14
5. "Sur le bord du lac" - 4:03
6. "Exercice" - 3:02
7. "Son visage était parfait" - 2:39
8. "C'était magique (Nuit de la poésie II)" - 3:30
9. "Je me touche dans le parc" - 3:13
10. "Retour à l'institut" - 5:05
