= Les Trois Accords =

Canadian rock band

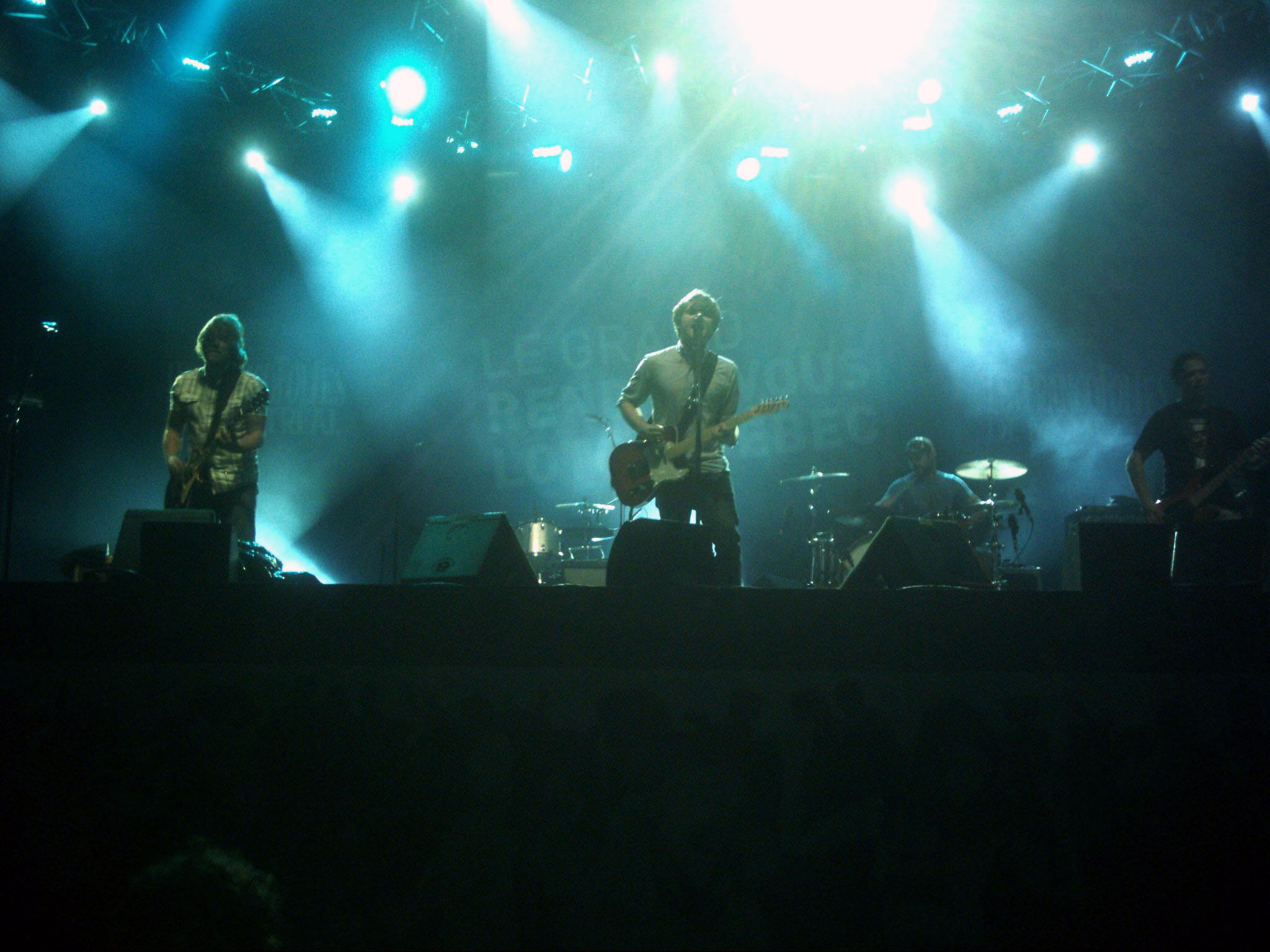
- Les Trois Accords in 2010

Background information
- Origin: Drummondville, Quebec, Canada
- Genres: Alternative rock, pop punk, comedy rock
- Years active: 1997–present
- Label: Indica
- Members: Pierre-Luc Boisvert; Charles Dubreuil; Alexandre Parr; Simon Proulx
- Past members: Olivier Benoit
- Website: lestroisaccords.com

Les Trois Accords is a Canadian rock band from Drummondville, Québec. The band released their first album, Gros Mammouth Album, in 2003. In 2004, Gros Mammouth Album Turbo (certified Platinum by the Music Canada) was released with two extra tracks, "Loin d'ici" and "Turbo Sympathique". In 2006, they released their second album, entitled Grand champion international de course (certified Gold by the Music Canada).

== History ==
The band was originally formed in 1997 by Olivier Benoit and Simon Proulx. The band's current members are:

- Pierre-Luc Boisvert (Bass; Joined in 2001)
- Charles Dubreuil (Drums and percussion; Joined in 2001)
- Alexandre Parr (Guitars, vocals; Joined in 1999)
- Simon Proulx (Vocalist, guitars)

In September 2005, Les Trois Accords were an opening act for the Rolling Stones in Moncton, New Brunswick. The concert drew an estimated 75,000 spectators.

Founding member Olivier Benoit left in 2009 to become the group's manager.

== Discography ==
=== Studio albums ===
- Gros mammouth album (2003)
- Gros mammouth album turbo (2004) (updated version)
- Grand champion international de course (2006)
- En beau country (2008)
- Dans mon corps (2009)
- J'aime ta grand-mère (2012)
- Joie d'être gai (2015)
- Beaucoup de plaisir (2018)
- Présence D'esprit (2022)
- Toujours les vacances (2025)

== See also ==
- List of Quebec musicians
