= Grand champion international de course =

Grand Champion International de Course

Studio album by Les Trois Accords
- Released: September 5, 2006
- Genre: Pop rock
- Length: 44:44
- Label: Indica Records

Les Trois Accords chronology
| Gros Mammouth Album (2003) | Grand Champion International de Course (2006) | Dans mon corps (2009) |

Grand Champion International de Course is the second album by Québécois rock/pop band Les Trois Accords released in 2006 featuring the single, "Grand Champion". The single was available as a free single of the week on the iTunes Store in October 2006.

== Track listing ==
1. "Bing Bing" - 3:12
2. "St-Cyrille-de-Wendover" - 2:45
3. "Grand Champion" - 3:07
4. "M'as Tu Dit?" - 1:53
5. "Gratte-moi" - 2:34
6. "Tout Nu sur La Plage" - 3:35
7. "Jean" - 3:10
8. "Ton Avion" - 2:44
9. "Louis-Félix-Antoine" - 3:13
10. "Pièce de Viande" - 2:37
11. "Youri" - 3:12
12. "Bac à Fleurs" - 3:13
13. "Tu" - 3:06
14. "Je T'ai Vu me Voir" - 3:01
15. "Megaphotocopie" - 3:19
