= Saskatchewan Glacier =

Glacier in Banff NP, Alberta, Canada

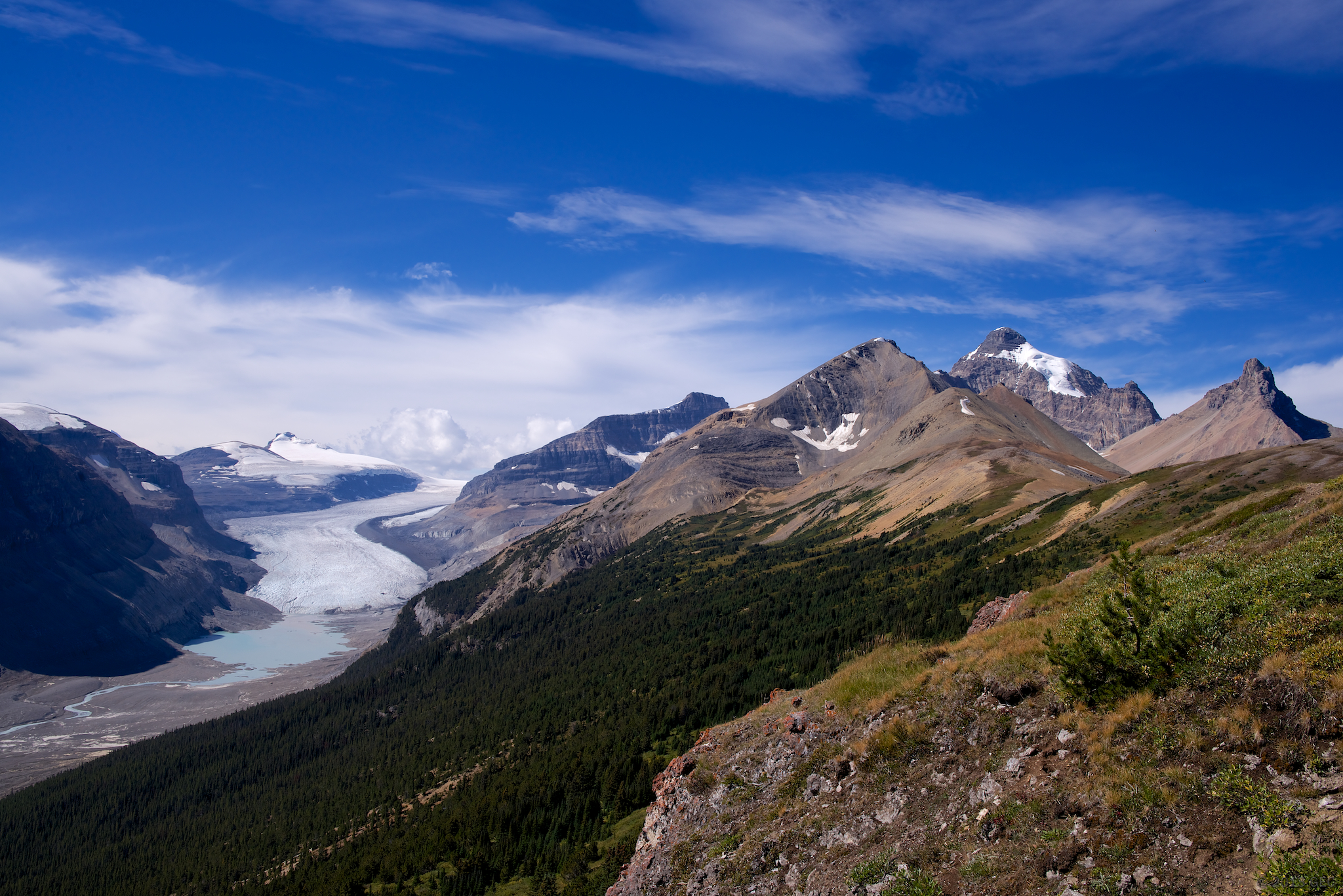
- Saskatchewan Glacier in Alberta, Canada seen from Parker Ridge

- Location within Alberta Location within British Columbia Location within Canada
- Interactive map of Saskatchewan Glacier
- Location: Alberta, Canada
- Coordinates: 52.138546°N 117.193222°W
- Area: 30 square kilometres (12 sq mi)
- Length: 13 kilometres (8 mi)
- Status: Receding

The Saskatchewan Glacier is located in Banff National Park, Alberta, Canada, approximately 120 km (75 mi) northwest of the town of Banff, and can be accessed from the Icefields Parkway. The Saskatchewan Glacier is the largest outflow glacier from the Columbia Icefield, which rests along the Continental Divide. The glacier is a primary water source for the North Saskatchewan River. The glacier is approximately 13 kilometres (8.1 mi) long and covers an area of 30 km^{2} (11.5 mi^{2}) and was measured in 1960 to be over 400 metres (1,310 ft) thick at a distance of 8 kilometres (5.0 mi) from the terminal snout. Between 1893 and 1953, Saskatchewan Glacier had receded a distance of 1,364 metres (4,475 ft), with the rate of retreat between 1948 and 1953 averaging 55 metres (180 ft) per year. The glacier, which flows northeast, exhibits a prominent medial moraine.

== See also ==
- List of glaciers in Canada

== Gallery ==
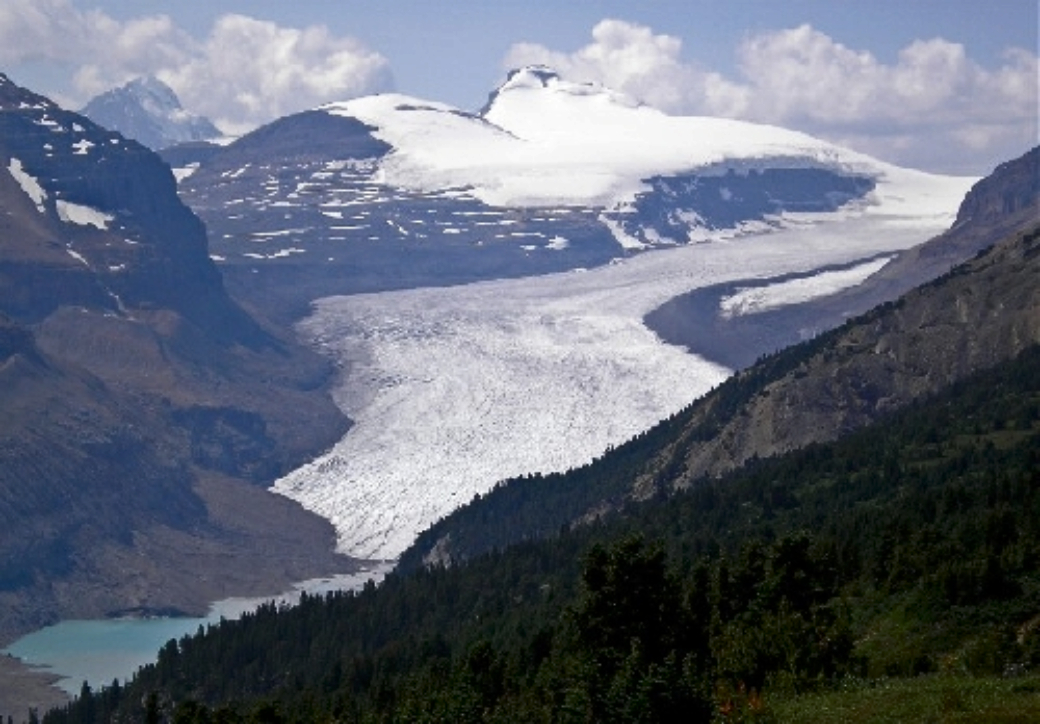
Saskatchewan Glacier with Castleguard Mountain from Parker Ridge

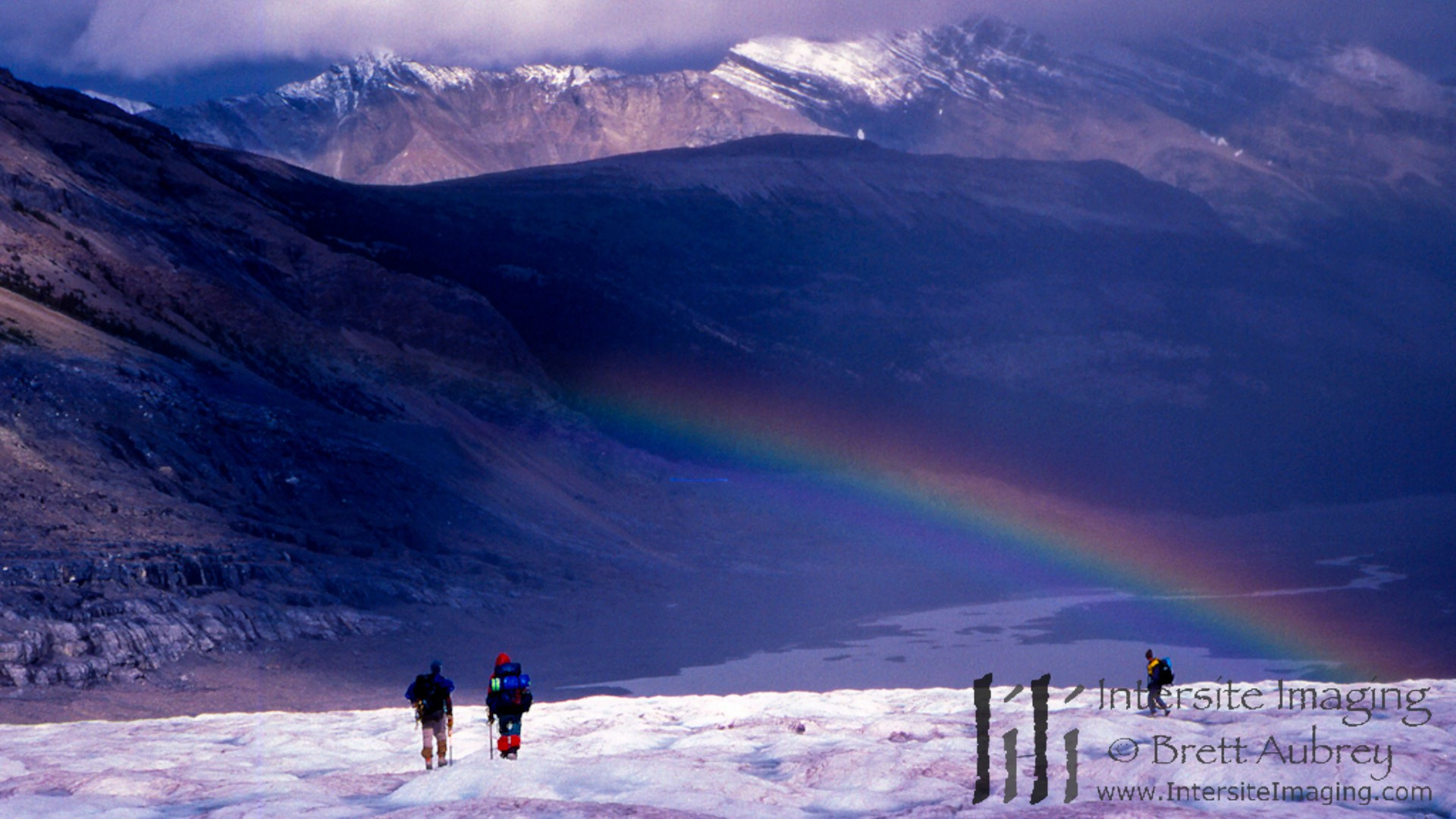
Saskatchewan Glacier & Parker Ridge from glacier's toe

In this animated gif of the Columbia Icefield, glaciated areas in 1990 are compared to 2000. The Saskatchewan Glacier is the large tongue shaped glacier on the left, which has both retreated and thinned along most of its length during the period.
