= Centennial Range =

Subrange of the Saint Elias Mountains in Yukon, Canada

- Location within Yukon

Highest point
- Peak: Centennial Peak
- Elevation: 3,820 m (12,530 ft)
- Listing: Canada highest peaks 26th
- Coordinates: 60°56′49″N 140°43′18″W

Dimensions
- Area: 341 km^{2} (132 mi^{2})

Geography
- Country: Canada
- Territory: Yukon
- Range coordinates: 60°56′52″N 140°44′37″W
- Parent range: Saint Elias Mountains

The Centennial Range is a sub-range of the Saint Elias Mountains. It is located inside Kluane National Park and Reserve in the far west of Yukon Territory in Canada. It consists of fourteen major peaks, and was named for Canada's Centennial in 1967. Its peaks bear the names of Canada's provinces and territories, with the exception of Nunavut, which was not a territory at the time. The tallest point is Centennial Peak. Nine of the peaks were climbed as part of the Yukon Alpine Centennial Expedition, part of the 1967 celebrations.

== Geography ==
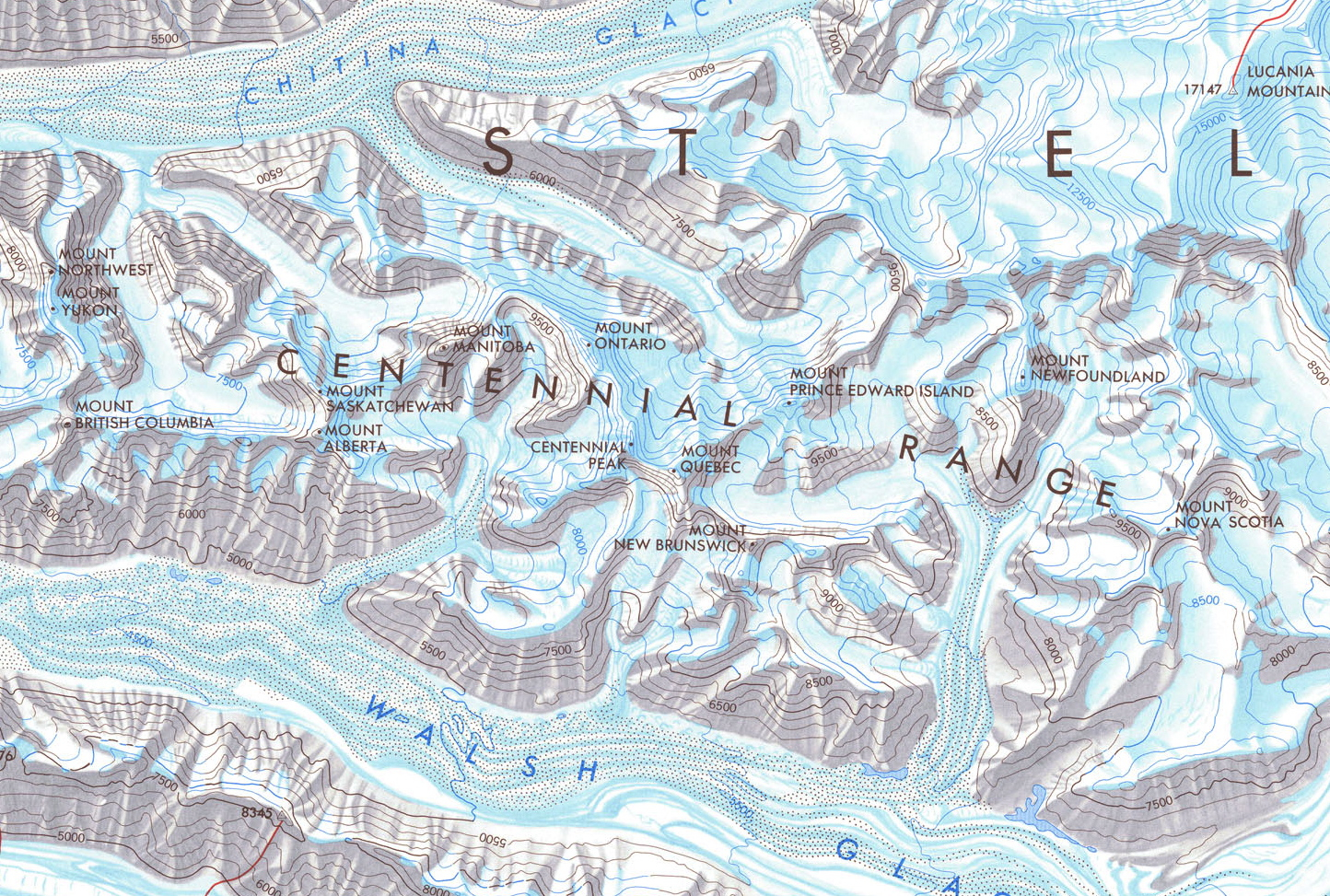
Topographic map of the Centennial Range

The Saint Elias Mountains are the highest in Canada, and second in North America only to the adjacent Alaska Range. They are located at the intersection of the Alaska, Yukon Territory, and British Columbia borders. The Centennial Range is north of Mount Logan and to the west of Mount Lucania. The peaks are lower than the surrounding mountains; no Centennial peak is over 4,000 metres (13,000 ft), while nearby peaks like Mount Steele and Lucania measure over 5,000 metres (16,000 ft). The range lies within Kluane National Park and Reserve.

The range runs roughly east to west, and is bounded by the Walsh Glacier to the south, and the Chitina Glacier to the north. The peaks are named for Canada's provinces and territories (with the exceptions of Centennial Peak and Mount Baffin, named after Baffin Island), and loosely correspond geographically to the positions of their namesakes. Mount Northwest is the farthest west, while Mount Nova Scotia is the easternmost peak. Nunavut does not have a mountain due to it not being a territory in 1967, when the peaks were named. The highest point in the range is Centennial Peak at 3,820 metres (12,530 ft).

== Yukon Alpine Centennial Expedition ==
The Alpine Club of Canada (ACC) had been interested in exploration of the more remote areas of the Saint Elias range since 1963. The club wanted to plan an expedition commemorating the one-hundred year anniversary of the founding of Canada, as well as a joint venture with the American Alpine Club to commemorate the centennial of the Alaska Purchase. The ACC president started discussions with the federal Centennial Commission in 1965 about a mountaineering event as a component of Canada's centennial celebrations. Federal funding was approved for the expedition in 1966.

Teams were assembled to represent each province and territory. The proposal called for each team to be made up of residents of the respective area, but due to a shortage of applications, a disproportionate number of climbers came from the mountainous province of British Columbia. The Centennial expedition was scheduled over two weeks in late July 1967.

Three base camps were established, called T-Bone, Prairie (named for the Canadian Prairies), and Fundy (named for the Bay of Fundy). Climbers from T-Bone attempted Mount Northwest, Mount Yukon, and Mount British Columbia. The Prairie camp supported teams on Mount Alberta, Mount Saskatchewan, Mount Ontario, and Mount Manitoba, as well as Centennial Peak. The Quebec, Prince Edward Island, Newfoundland, and Nova Scotia teams used the Fundy base camp. In all, nine of the expeditions were successful, despite the fact that the climbers were assessing new routes and fighting windy, wet weather. Mount Saskatchewan remains unclimbed.

== Major peaks ==
Peaks are listed by their position west to east. Heights from Fisher.

- Mount Northwest, 3,215 metres (10,548 ft)
- Mount Yukon, 3,230 metres (10,600 ft)
- Mount British Columbia, 3,108 metres (10,197 ft)
- Mount Baffin, 3,108 metres (10,197 ft)
- Mount Alberta, 3,328 metres (10,919 ft)
- Mount Saskatchewan, 3,462 metres (11,358 ft)
- Mount Manitoba, 3,398 metres (11,148 ft)
- Centennial Peak, 3,820 metres (12,530 ft)
- Mount Ontario, 3,718 metres (12,198 ft)
- Mount Quebec, 3,749 metres (12,300 ft)
- Mount Prince Edward Island, 3,736 metres (12,257 ft)
- Mount New Brunswick, 3,387 metres (11,112 ft)
- Mount Newfoundland, 3,670 metres (12,040 ft)
- Mount Nova Scotia, 3,291 metres (10,797 ft)
