= Nigel Peak =

Mountain in Alberta, Canada

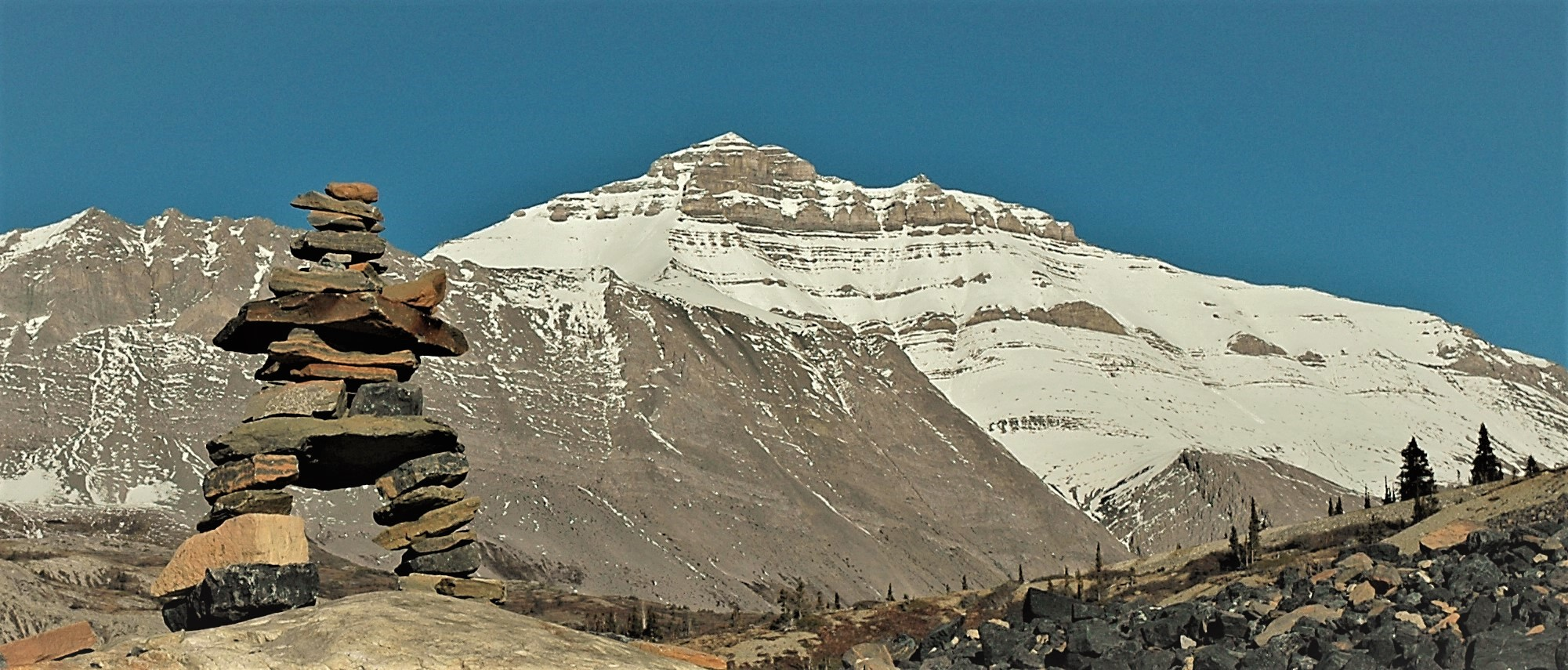
- West aspect (with inukshuk)

Highest point
- Elevation: 3,211 m (10,535 ft)
- Prominence: 611 m (2,005 ft)
- Parent peak: Sunwapta Peak (3,315 m)
- Listing: Mountains of Alberta
- Coordinates: 52°14′22″N 117°10′18″W

Naming
- Etymology: Nigel Vavasour

Geography
- Location within Alberta Location within Canada
- Interactive map of Nigel Peak
- Location: Alberta, Canada
- Parent range: Canadian Rockies
- Topo map: NTS 83C3 Columbia Icefield

Geology
- Rock type: Sedimentary

Climbing
- First ascent: 1919 by Interprovincial Boundary Commission
- Easiest route: Scrambling

Nigel Peak is a 3,211-metre (10,535-foot) mountain summit located on the shared border of Banff National Park and Jasper National Park, in the Canadian Rockies of Alberta, Canada. Nigel has two peaks, the north summit is the highest point. The nearest higher peak is Mount Athabasca, 6.4 km (4.0 mi) to the south-southwest. Nigel Peak is situated immediately north of Sunwapta Pass and can be seen from the Icefields Parkway and from Athabasca Glacier. Topographic relief is significant as the summit rises 1,100 metres (3,609 ft) above the parkway in two kilometres (1.2 mile).

== History ==
Nigel Vavasour was a packer who accompanied J. Norman Collie and Hugh Stutfield to the Columbia Icefield area in 1897. The mountain was named by the mountaineers during an 1898 sheep hunt with Nigel. The mountain's toponym was officially adopted March 5, 1935, by the Geographical Names Board of Canada. The first ascent of the mountain was made in 1919 by the Interprovincial Boundary Commission.

== Geology ==
Like other mountains in Banff Park, Nigel Peak is composed of sedimentary rock laid down from the Precambrian to Jurassic periods. Formed in shallow seas, this sedimentary rock was pushed east and over the top of younger rock during the Laramide orogeny.

== Climate ==
Based on the Köppen climate classification, Nigel Peak is located in a subarctic climate zone with cold, snowy winters, and mild summers. Winter temperatures can drop below -20 °C with wind chill factors below -30 °C. Precipitation runoff from Nigel Peak drains south into the North Saskatchewan River, and north into the Sunwapta River which is a tributary of the Athabasca River.

== Gallery ==
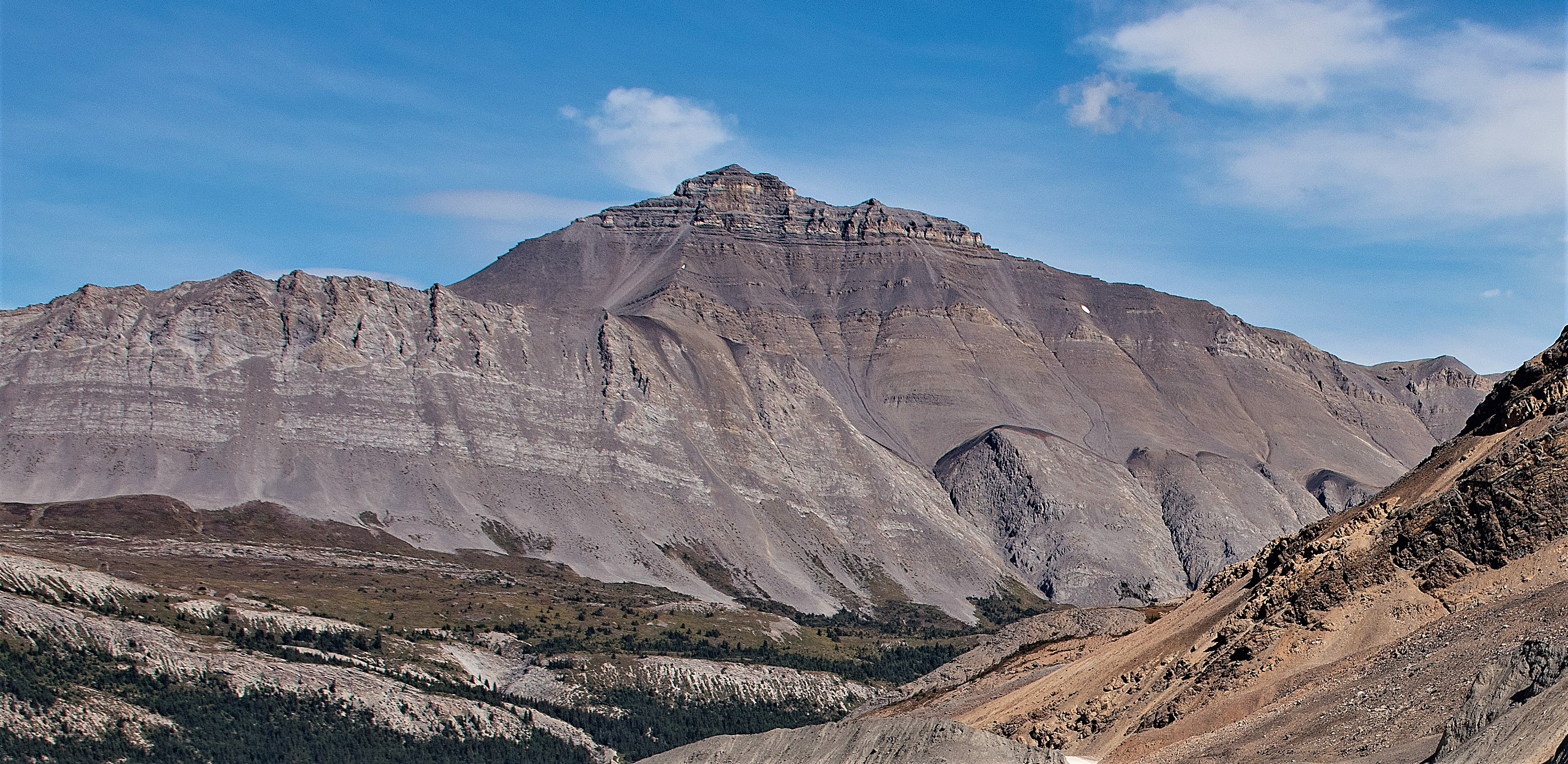
Nigel Peak from west

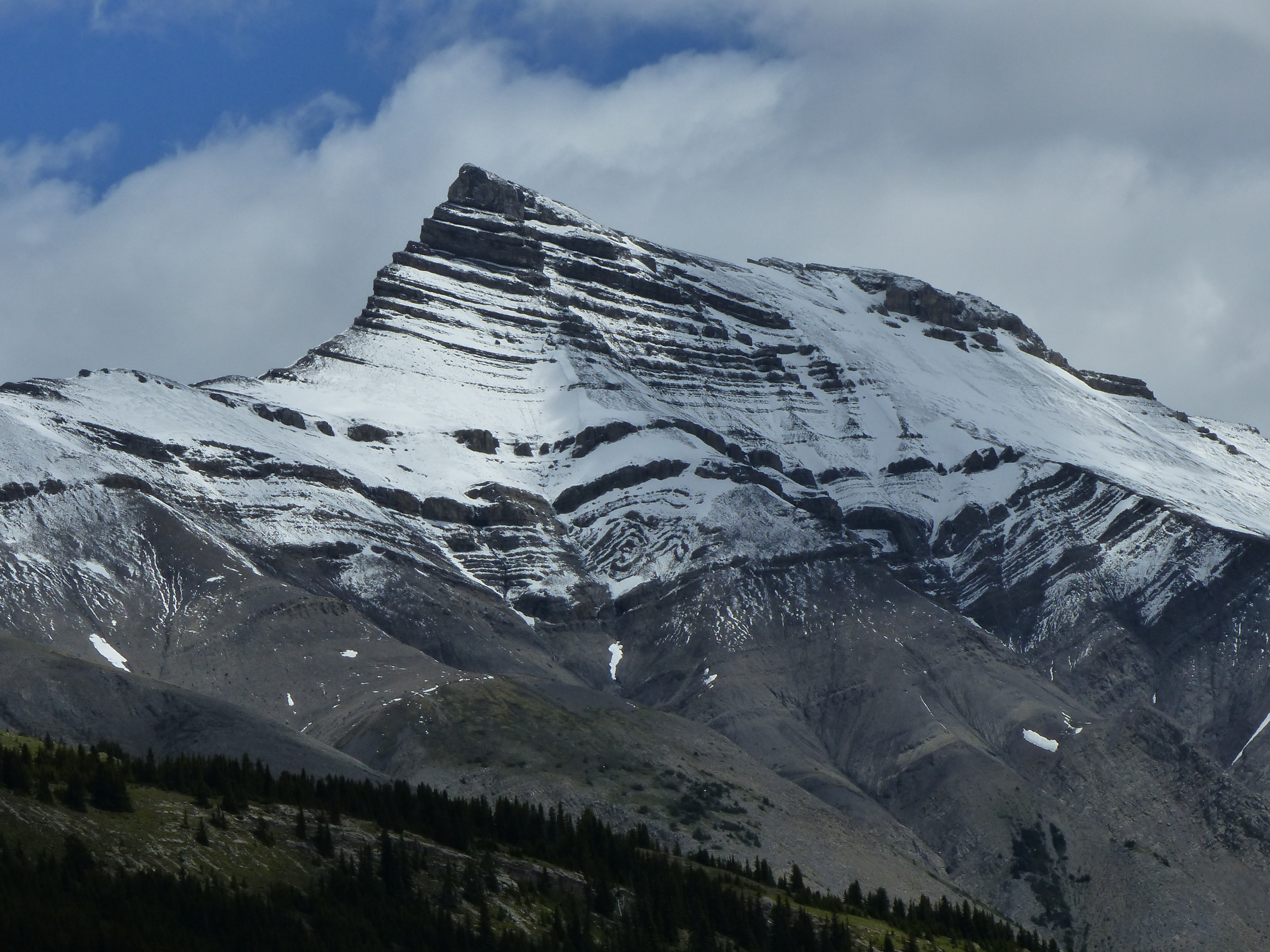
The southeast secondary summit

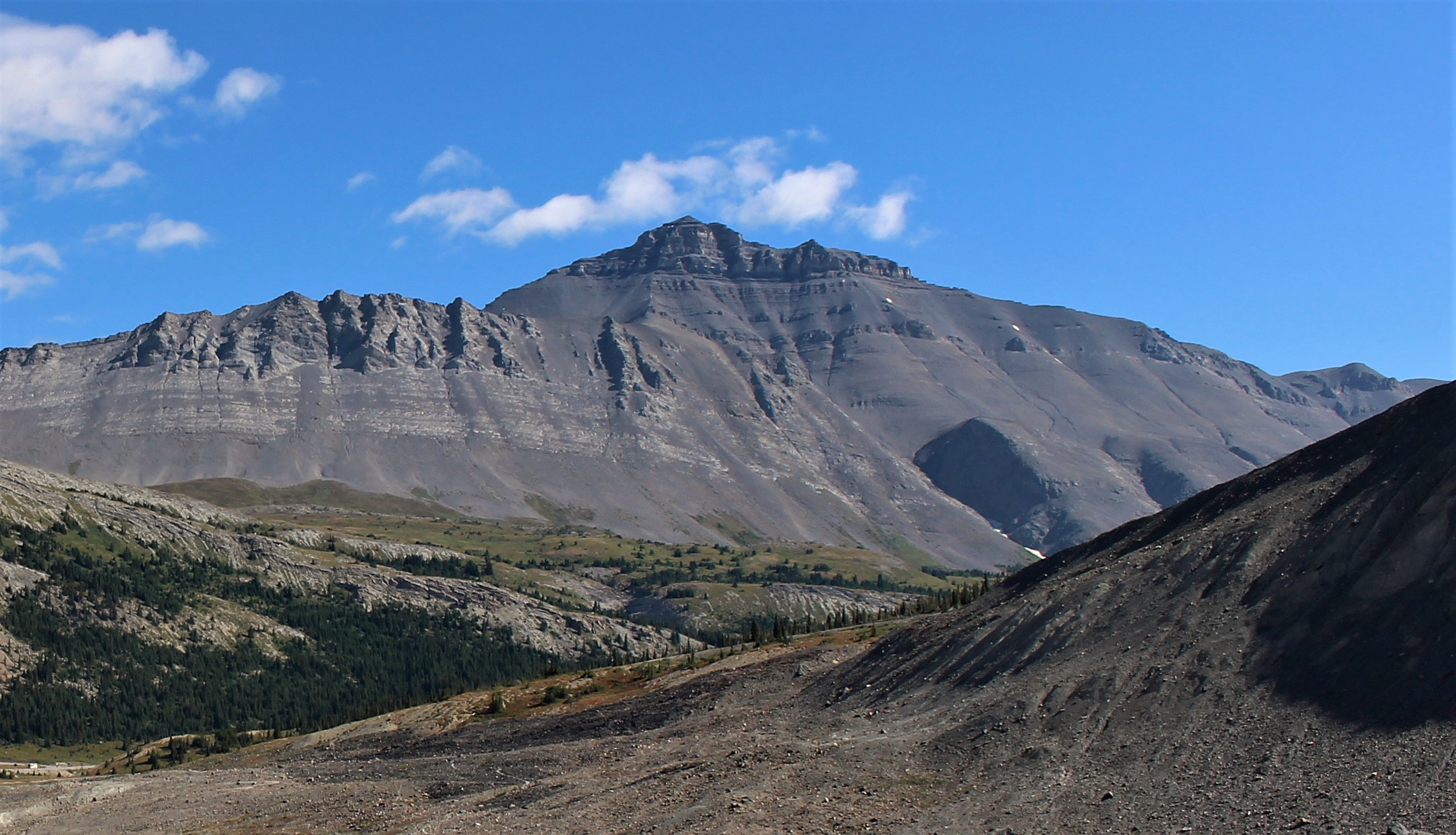
West aspect

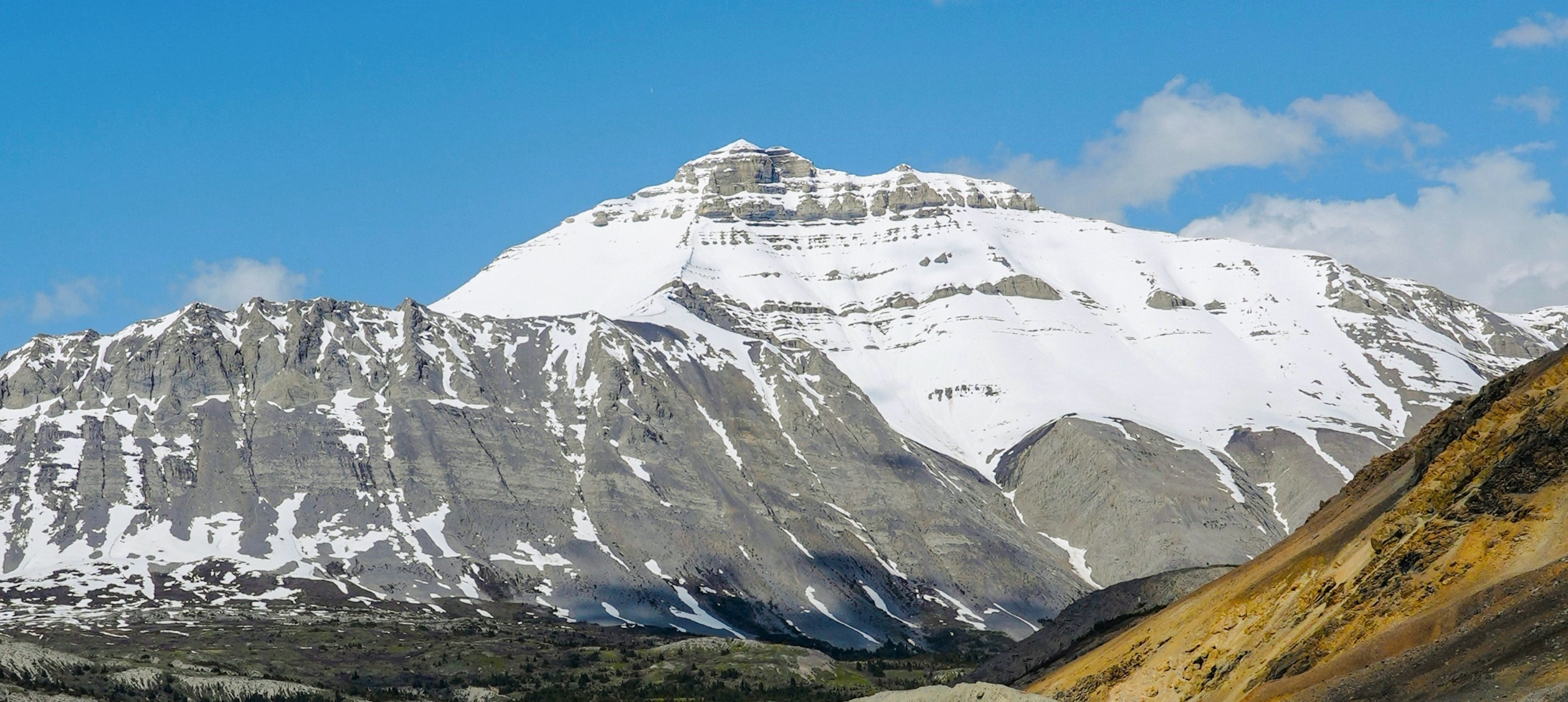

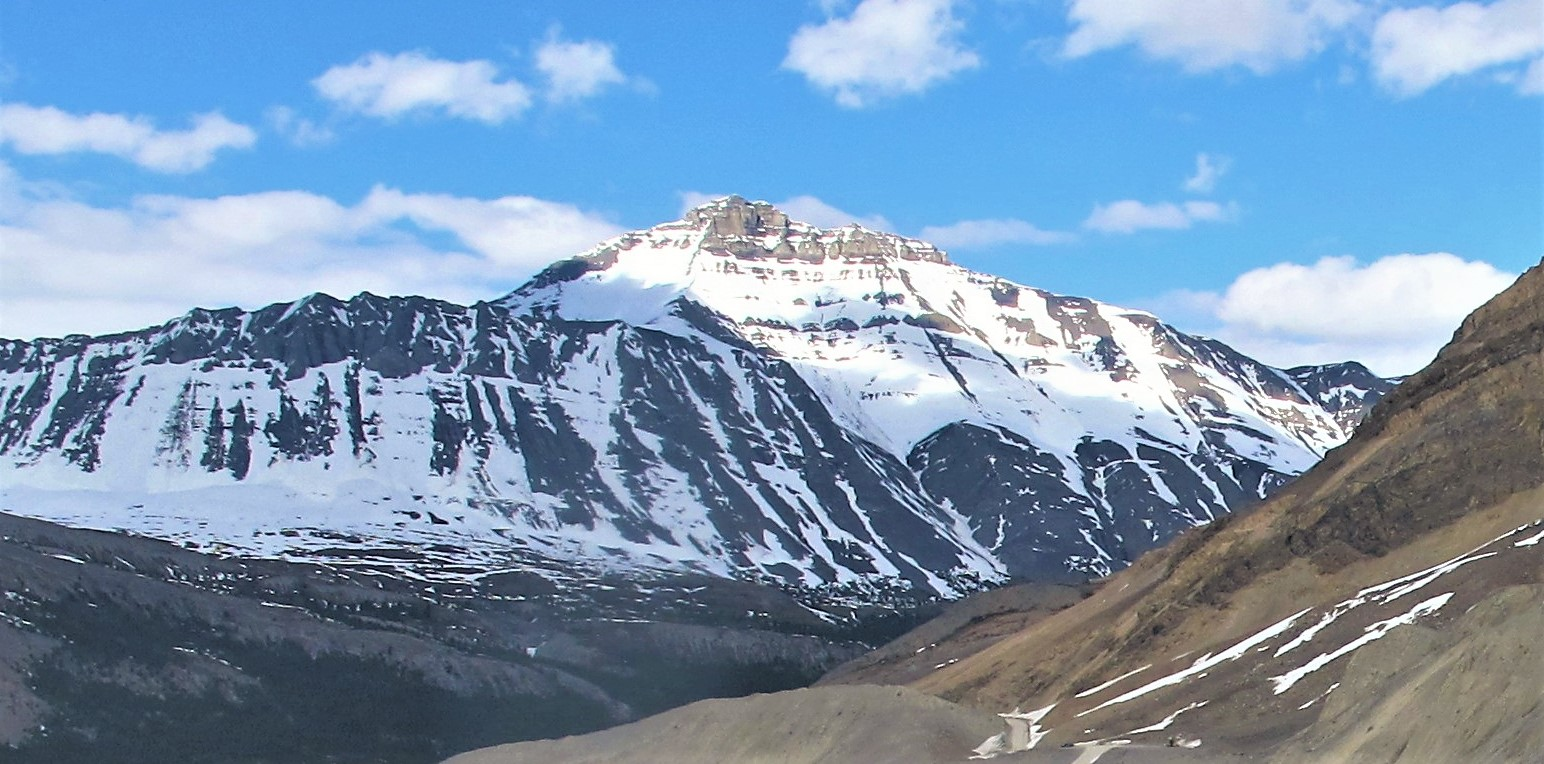
West aspect

== See also ==
- List of mountains in the Canadian Rockies
- Geology of the Rocky Mountains
