= Gros mammouth album =

Gros Mammouth Album

Studio album by Les Trois Accords
- Released: 2003
- Genre: Alternative rock, pop punk
- Length: 38:45; 45:50 (re-release)

Les Trois Accords chronology
Gros Mammouth Album (2003)	Grand Champion International de Course (2006)

Gros Mammouth Album is the first album by Québécois rock/pop band Les Trois Accords. It was released in 2003, and re-released in 2004 as Gros Mammouth Album Turbo featuring two new tracks, 'Loin d'ici' and 'Turbo sympathique'. Also, track "Auto-cannibal" was removed.

== Track listing ==
No.	Title	Length
1.	"Gros Mammouth Chanson"	3:41
2.	"Lucille"	2:52
3.	"Hawaïenne"	2:29
4.	"Manon"	2:56
5.	"Laisse-Moi"	2:00
6.	"Saskatchewan"	4:24
7.	"L'eusses-Tu Cru?"	2:40
8.	"Montagne De Fumier"	1:23
9.	"Turbo Sympathique"	3:03
10.	"Bateau"	4:12
11.	"Ho Ma Jolie"	2:28
12.	"Loin D'Ici"	3:52
13.	"Une Minute"	3:18
14.	"Super Bon"	3:51
15.	"Vraiment Beau"	2:38
Total length:		49:47
