= Sunwapta Pass =

Mountain pass in Alberta, Canada

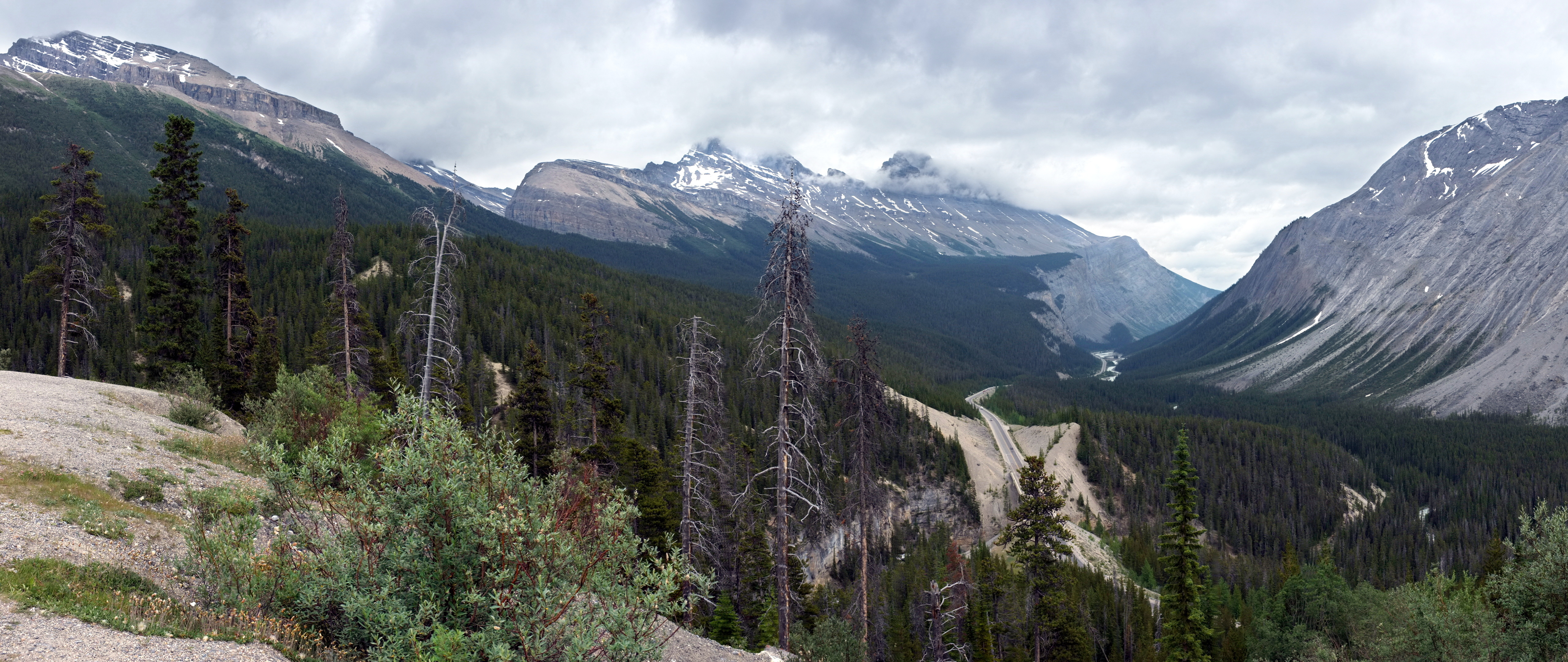
- Looking south with Icefields Parkway below

- Location within Alberta
- Elevation: 2,035 m (6,677 ft)
- Traversed by: Highway 93 (Icefields Parkway)

Third Approach
- Location: Banff National Park / Jasper National Park, Alberta, Canada
- Range: Canadian Rockies
- Coordinates: 52°12′50″N 117°09′34″W
- Topo map: NTS 83C3 Columbia Icefield

Sunwapta Pass (2,035 m/6,677 ft) (2,023 m/6,637 ft) (2,055 m/6,742 ft) is a mountain pass in the Canadian Rockies in the province of Alberta. Sunwapta Pass is the low point of the saddle created between Mount Athabasca and Nigel Peak. The pass marks the boundary between Banff and Jasper national parks. The Icefields Parkway travels through Sunwapta Pass 108 km (67 mi) southeast of the town of Jasper and 122 km (76 mi) northwest of the Parkway's junction with the Trans-Canada Highway near Lake Louise. The pass is the second highest point on the Icefields Parkway. Bow Summit (2,069 m/6,790 ft) in Banff National Park is the highest point on the parkway.

Sunwapta Pass marks the watershed divide between the Athabasca River drainage to the north and the North Saskatchewan system to the south. Waters flowing north from this summit eventually reach the Arctic Ocean via the Mackenzie River, while those flowing south cross the prairies via the Saskatchewan and Nelson rivers to Hudson Bay and the Arctic Ocean.

== Climate ==
Climate data for Sunwapta, Alberta (1555m)
Month	Jan	Feb	Mar	Apr	May	Jun	Jul	Aug	Sep	Oct	Nov	Dec	Year
Record high °C (°F)	8.5 (47.3)	12.5 (54.5)	17.0 (62.6)	21.5 (70.7)	27.0 (80.6)	28.0 (82.4)	31.1 (88.0)	31.2 (88.2)	29.5 (85.1)	24.5 (76.1)	13.5 (56.3)	10.0 (50.0)	31.2 (88.2)
Mean daily maximum °C (°F)	−5.2 (22.6)	−2.0 (28.4)	2.8 (37.0)	7.4 (45.3)	12.9 (55.2)	16.4 (61.5)	18.9 (66.0)	19.3 (66.7)	14.2 (57.6)	7.1 (44.8)	−2.0 (28.4)	−6.8 (19.8)	6.9 (44.4)
Daily mean °C (°F)	−11.9 (10.6)	−10.0 (14.0)	−5.2 (22.6)	0.6 (33.1)	5.7 (42.3)	9.3 (48.7)	11.4 (52.5)	11.2 (52.2)	6.5 (43.7)	0.8 (33.4)	−7.9 (17.8)	−12.8 (9.0)	−0.2 (31.6)
Mean daily minimum °C (°F)	−18.5 (−1.3)	−18.0 (−0.4)	−13.0 (8.6)	−6.2 (20.8)	−1.5 (29.3)	2.2 (36.0)	3.9 (39.0)	3.1 (37.6)	−1.2 (29.8)	−5.6 (21.9)	−13.7 (7.3)	−18.8 (−1.8)	−7.3 (18.9)
Record low °C (°F)	−42.0 (−43.6)	−47.0 (−52.6)	−39.0 (−38.2)	−26.5 (−15.7)	−10.7 (12.7)	−5.0 (23.0)	−2.5 (27.5)	−6.5 (20.3)	−14.0 (6.8)	−34.5 (−30.1)	−44.0 (−47.2)	−43.5 (−46.3)	−47.0 (−52.6)
Average precipitation mm (inches)	32.9 (1.30)	24.3 (0.96)	28.2 (1.11)	23.0 (0.91)	32.2 (1.27)	57.6 (2.27)	67.9 (2.67)	67.3 (2.65)	42.3 (1.67)	36.9 (1.45)	39.7 (1.56)	25.2 (0.99)	477.4 (18.80)
Average rainfall mm (inches)	1.2 (0.05)	0.0 (0.0)	0.2 (0.01)	3.5 (0.14)	24.9 (0.98)	56.3 (2.22)	67.7 (2.67)	67.3 (2.65)	38.3 (1.51)	16.7 (0.66)	3.4 (0.13)	0.0 (0.0)	279.6 (11.01)
Average snowfall cm (inches)	31.7 (12.5)	24.3 (9.6)	27.9 (11.0)	19.8 (7.8)	7.2 (2.8)	1.3 (0.5)	0.2 (0.1)	0.0 (0.0)	4.0 (1.6)	20.2 (8.0)	36.3 (14.3)	25.2 (9.9)	198.2 (78.0)
Source: Environment Canada
