= Mount Saskatchewan (Alberta) =

Mountain in Banff National Park, Alberta, Canada

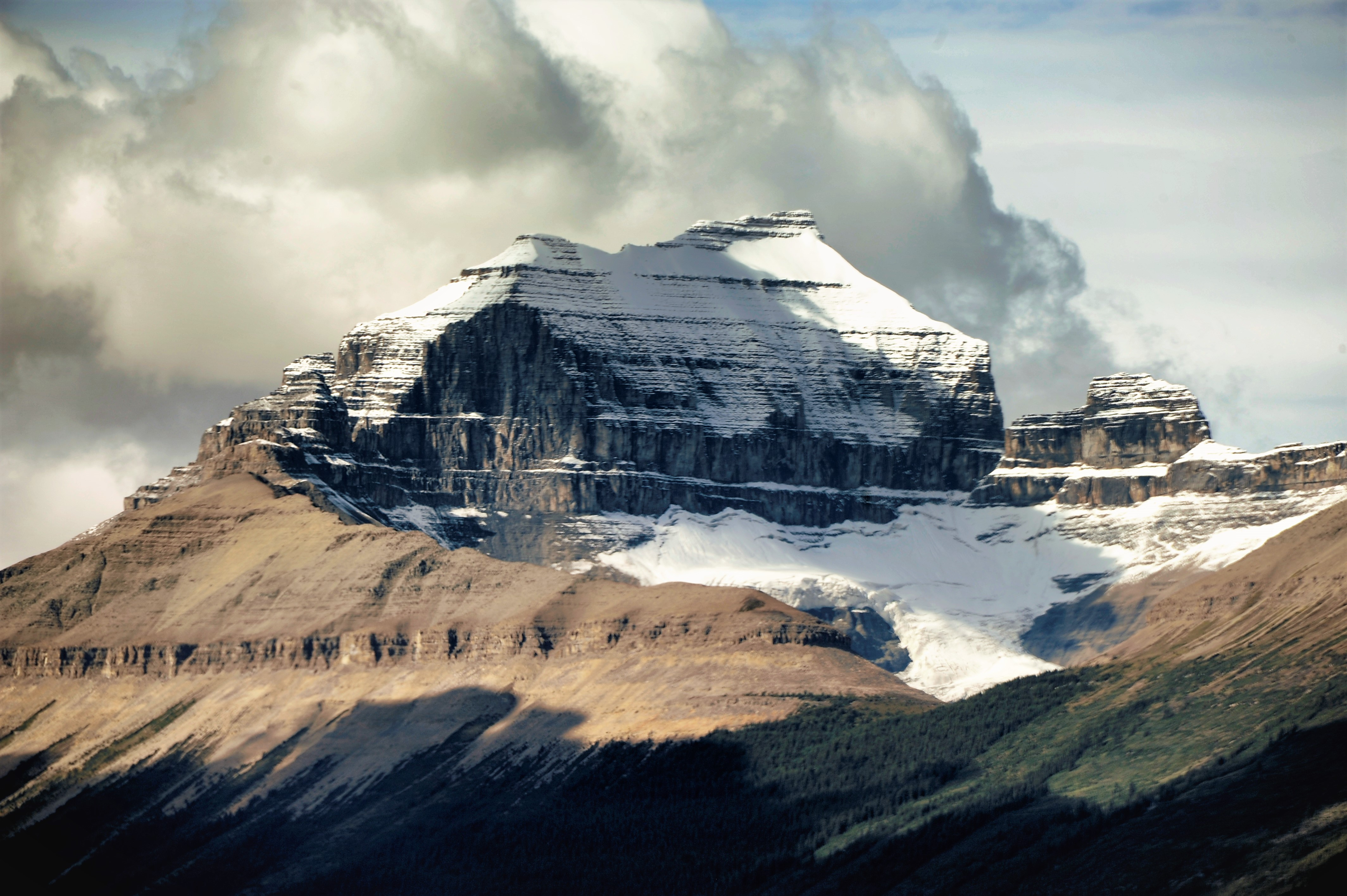
- Mt. Saskatchewan

Highest point
- Elevation: 3,342 m (10,965 ft)
- Prominence: 1,102 m (3,615 ft)
- Parent peak: Mount Andromeda (3450 m)
- Listing: Mountains of Alberta
- Coordinates: 52°05′59″N 117°05′36″W

Geography
- Location within Alberta
- Interactive map of Mount Saskatchewan
- Country: Canada
- Province: Alberta
- Protected area: Banff National Park
- Parent range: Columbia Icefield
- Topo map: NTS 83C3 Columbia Icefield

Climbing
- First ascent: July 12, 1923, by Conrad Kain, W.S. Ladd, J. Monroe Thorington
- Easiest route: technical climb

Mount Saskatchewan is a mountain located in the North Saskatchewan River valley of Banff National Park, in the Canadian Rockies of Alberta, Canada.

J. Norman Collie named the mountain in 1898 for the nearby Saskatchewan River. One report said Collie so named it due to its possession of the headwaters of the North Saskatchewan River.

== Lighthouse Tower ==
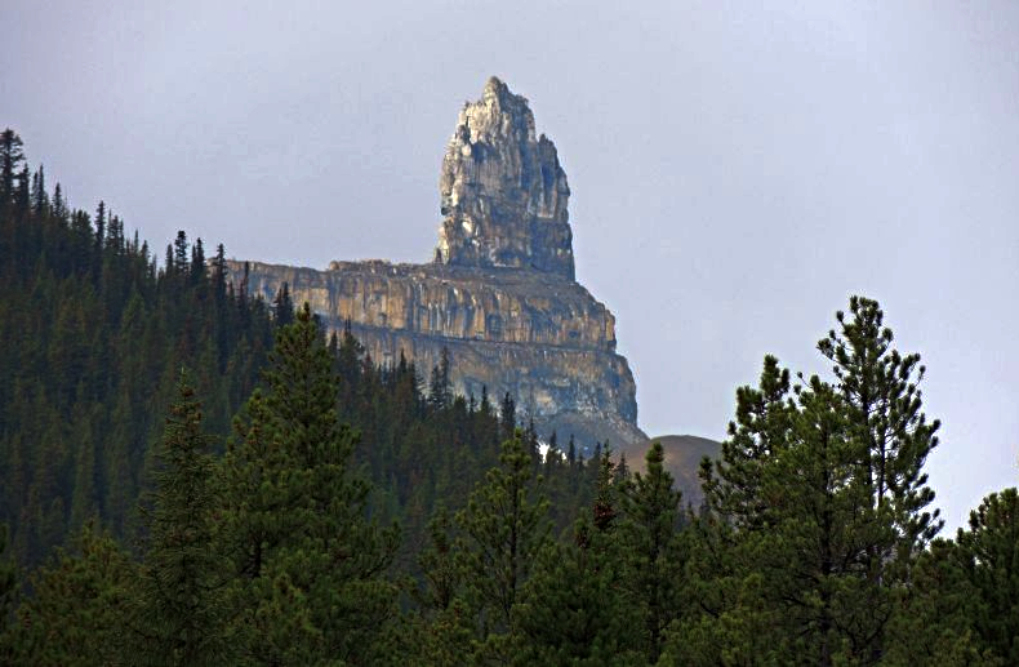

A 75 m (246 ft) pinnacle unofficially named Lighthouse Tower and also sometimes referred to as "Cleopatra's Needle" (elevation 2,960 m (9,710 ft)), is located two kilometres from the summit on the eastern ridge of Mt. Saskatchewan.

It was first climbed in 1964 by G. Boehnisch and L. Mackay.

== Geology ==
Like other mountains in Banff Park, Mount Saskatchewan is composed of sedimentary rock laid down from the Precambrian to Jurassic periods. Formed in shallow seas, this sedimentary rock was pushed east and over the top of younger rock during the Laramide orogeny. The north aspect of the peak supports an unnamed glacier which can be seen well from Parker Ridge.

== Climate ==
Based on the Köppen climate classification, Mount Saskatchewan is located in a subarctic climate with cold, snowy winters, and mild summers. Temperatures can drop below −20 °C with wind chill factors below −30 °C. Weather conditions during summer months are optimum for climbing.

== Gallery ==
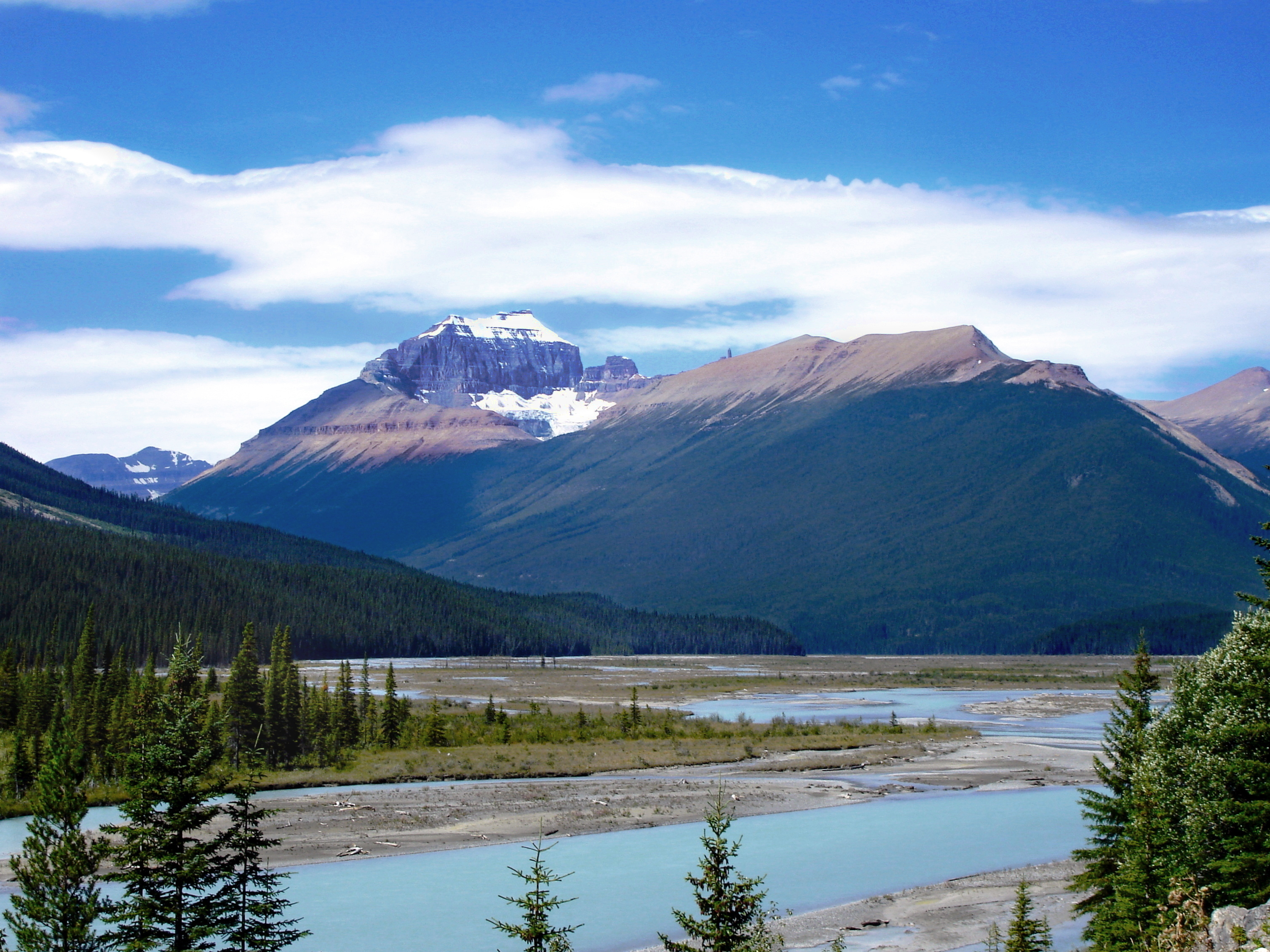

== See also ==
- List of mountains of Canada
- List of mountains in the Canadian Rockies
