= Mount Saskatchewan (Yukon) =

Mountain in Yukon, Canada

- Location within Yukon

Highest point
- Elevation: 3,500 m (11,500 ft)
- Prominence: 600 m (2,000 ft)
- Parent peak: Mount Ontario
- Coordinates: 60°57′28″N 140°51′04″W

Geography
- Location: Yukon, Canada
- Parent range: Saint Elias Mountains
- Topo map: NTS 115C15 Mount Yukon

Climbing
- First ascent: Unclimbed as of June 2012
- Easiest route: rock/glacier/snow/ice climb

Mount Saskatchewan (3,500 metres (11,500 ft)) is a mountain in the extreme southwestern corner of Yukon in Kluane National Park and Reserve. The peak was named in 1967 for the province of Saskatchewan to mark Canada's centennial. As of 2012, the mountain is the only peak named after a Canadian province or territory – there are 11 others in the Yukon's Centennial Range – that remains unclimbed.

== Attempted ascents ==
The first attempt to climb the mountain was made in 1967 as part of the centennial celebrations. A team from Saskatchewan made a second attempt in May 2005 to celebrate the centennial of the province. However, warmer than usual weather conditions and difficulties in finding a relatively safe route rebuffed the attempt, which was made after a 35-km glacial approach. A third unsuccessful attempt was made in 2007.

In 2012, a team from Saskatchewan composed of Steve Whittington, Jeff Dmytrowich, Sam Unger and Wren Rabut attempted to climb the peak with the same base camp as was used in 1967. Their attempt commenced on May 18, but the group was forced to turn back after climbing to about 3,200 metres (10,500 ft). Numerous crevasse falls and weather conditions hampered the group's efforts to reach the summit.

In early spring 2013 the Swedish team of Benny Elofsson, Joel Johansson and Axel Palmcrantz tried to climb Mt. Saskatchewan from north via Chitina Glacier. They did not find a secure route and had to abandon their climb of the mountain. Two other, presumably unclimbed peaks nearby were summited instead.
