= List of awards and nominations received by Alessia Cara =

Alessia Cara awards and nominations
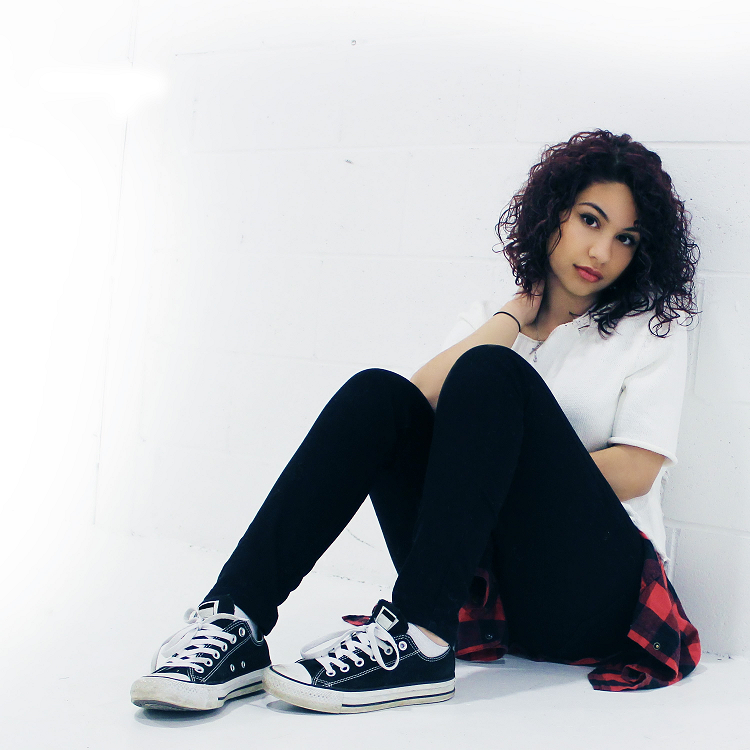
- Cara in 2015
Awards and nominations
Award	Wins	Nominations
American Music Awards	0	2
ASCAP Pop Music Awards	2	3
BBC Music Awards	0	1
BET Awards	0	1
Billboard Music Awards	0	2
Canadian Radio Music Awards	3	4
Canadian Screen Awards	0	1
Grammy Awards	1	4
iHeartRadio Music Awards	1	6
iHeartRadio MMVAs	2	14
Juno Awards	5	12
MTV Europe Music Awards	1	5
MTV Video Music Awards	2	8
MTV Video Music Awards Japan	0	1
Nickelodeon Kids' Choice Awards	0	2
People's Choice Awards	0	1
Radio Disney Music Awards	1	3
SOCAN Awards	1	1
Streamy Awards	1	1
Teen Choice Awards	0	3

Totals (Note: Certain award groups do not simply award one winner. They acknowledge several different recipients, have runners-up, and have third place. Since this is a specific recognition and is different from losing an award, runner-up mentions are considered wins in this award tally. For simplification and to avoid errors, each award in this list has been presumed to have had a prior nomination.)
- Wins: 24
- Nominations: 73

Canadian singer and songwriter Alessia Cara has won 25 awards out of 74 nominations. Cara signed a record deal with EP Entertainment and Def Jam Recordings in 2014, and released her debut single "Here" the following year, which earned her six nominations at the 2016 iHeartRadio MMVAs and a nomination for Single of the Year at the Juno Awards. In 2017, she released "Stay" alongside Russian-German producer Zedd, which won for Best Dance Video at the 2017 MTV Video Music Awards, and received a nomination for Top Dance/Electronic Song at the 2018 Billboard Music Awards. That same year, she released "1-800-273-8255" in collaboration with American rapper Logic and singer Khalid, which received nominations for Best Collaboration and Best Video with a Social Message at the 2018 MTV Video Music Awards and won for Best Video at the 2018 iHeartRadio MMVAs. Awarded 1 iHeartRadio Music Awards along with the accomplishment of reaching 1 Billion Total Audience Spins for "Stay" ft Zedd.

At the 60th Annual Grammy Awards, "1-800-273-8255" received nominations for Song of the Year and Best Music Video, "Stay" was nominated for Best Pop Duo/Group Performance, and Cara won for Best New Artist. In 2018, the "Growing Pains" music video earned nominations for Fan Fave Video and Best Cinematography at the 2018 iHeartRadio MMVAs and 2018 MTV Video Music Awards, respectively.

Alessia Cara was set to host the 49th Annual Juno Awards, but the event was cancelled due to the coronavirus pandemic. She was the most nominated artist of that year, leading with six nominations. She won Album of the Year, Songwriter of the Year and Pop Album of the Year.

== Awards and nominations ==
Award	Year	Nominee/work	Category	Result	Ref(s)
American Music Awards	2016	Herself	New Artist of the Year	Nominated	
American Music Awards	2017	Herself	Favorite Pop/Rock Female Artist	Nominated	
ASCAP Pop Music Awards	2016	"Here"	Most Performed Songs	Won	
ASCAP Pop Music Awards	2018	"Stay" (with Zedd)	Award Winning Song	Won	
ASCAP Pop Music Awards	2018	"1-800-273-8255" (with Logic and Khalid)	Award Winning Song	Won	
Sound of...	2016	Herself	Sound of 2016	Second	
BBC Music Awards	2016	"Here"	Song of the Year	Nominated	
BET Awards	2016	Herself	Best New Artist	Nominated	
Billboard Music Awards	2017	Herself	Top New Artist	Nominated	
Billboard Music Awards	2018	"Stay" (with Zedd)	Top Dance/Electronic Song	Nominated	
Canadian Radio Music Awards	2016	Herself	Best New Group or Solo Artist: CHR	Won	
Canadian Radio Music Awards	2017	Herself	Fan Choice Award	Won	
Canadian Radio Music Awards	2017	"Wild Things"	Song of the Year	Nominated	
Canadian Radio Music Awards	2017	"Here"	Best New Group or Solo Artist: Mainstream AC	Won	
Canadian Screen Awards	2017	"Here" and "Wild Things" at the Juno Awards of 2016	Performance in a Variety or Sketch Comedy Program or Series	Nominated	
Grammy Awards	2018	Herself	Best New Artist	Won	
Grammy Awards	2018	"1-800-273-8255" (with Logic and Khalid)	Song of the Year	Nominated	
Grammy Awards	2018	"1-800-273-8255" (with Logic and Khalid)	Best Music Video	Nominated	
Grammy Awards	2018	"Stay" (with Zedd)	Best Pop Duo/Group Performance	Nominated	
Latin Grammy Awards	2019	"Querer Mejor"	Song of the Year	Nominated	
Latin Grammy Awards	2019	"Querer Mejor"	Record of the Year	Nominated	
iHeartRadio Music Awards	2016	"Bad Blood" – Covering	Best Cover Song	Nominated	
iHeartRadio Music Awards	2017	"Scars to Your Beautiful"	Best Lyrics	Nominated	
iHeartRadio Music Awards	2017	Herself	Best New Pop Artist	Nominated	
iHeartRadio Music Awards	2018	Herself	Female Artist of the Year	Nominated	
iHeartRadio Music Awards	2018	"Stay" (with Zedd)	Best Collaboration	Nominated	
iHeartRadio Music Awards	2018	"Stay" (with Zedd)	Dance Song of the Year	Won	
iHeartRadio Titanium Award	2017	"Stay" (with Zedd)	1 Billion Total Audience Spins on iHeartRadio Stations	Won	
iHeartRadio MMVAs	2016	"Here"	Video of the Year	Nominated	
iHeartRadio MMVAs	2016	"Here"	Best Pop Video	Nominated	
iHeartRadio MMVAs	2016	"Here"	Most Buzzworthy Canadian	Nominated	
iHeartRadio MMVAs	2016	"Here"	Best New Canadian Artist	Won	
iHeartRadio MMVAs	2016	"Here"	iHeartRadio Canadian Single of the Year	Nominated	
iHeartRadio MMVAs	2016	"Here"	Fan Fave Video	Nominated	
iHeartRadio MMVAs	2016	Herself	Fan Fave Artist or Group	Nominated	
iHeartRadio MMVAs	2017	Herself	Fan Fave Artist or Group	Nominated	
iHeartRadio MMVAs	2017	Herself	Most Buzzworthy Canadian	Nominated	
iHeartRadio MMVAs	2017	"Scars to Your Beautiful"	Canadian Single of the Year	Nominated	
iHeartRadio MMVAs	2018	"1-800-273-8255" (with Logic and Khalid)	Video of the Year	Won	
iHeartRadio MMVAs	2018	"Growing Pains"	Fan Fave Video	Nominated	
iHeartRadio MMVAs	2018	Herself	Best Pop Artist or Group	Nominated	
iHeartRadio MMVAs	2018	Herself	Fan Fave Artist	Nominated	
Juno Awards	2016	Herself	Breakthrough Artist of the Year	Won	
Juno Awards	2016	Herself	Fan Choice Award	Nominated	
Juno Awards	2016	"Here"	Single of the Year	Nominated	
Juno Awards	2016	Four Pink Walls	R&B/Soul Recording of the Year	Nominated	
Juno Awards	2017	Herself	Artist of the Year	Nominated	
Juno Awards	2017	Herself	Fan Choice Award	Nominated	
Juno Awards	2017	"Wild Things"	Single of the Year	Nominated	
Juno Awards	2017	Know-It-All	Pop Album of the Year	Won	
Juno Awards	2018	"How Far I'll Go"	Single of the Year	Nominated	
Juno Awards	2018	Herself	Fan Choice Award	Nominated	
Juno Awards	2019	Herself	Artist of the Year	Nominated	
Juno Awards	2019	Herself	Fan Choice Award	Nominated	
Juno Awards	2020	"Out of Love"	Single of the Year	Nominated	
Juno Awards	2020	The Pains of Growing	Pop Album of the Year	Won	
Juno Awards	2020	The Pains of Growing	Album of the Year	Won	
Juno Awards	2020	Herself	Songwriter of the Year	Won	
Juno Awards	2020	Herself	Artist of the Year	Nominated	
Juno Awards	2020	Herself	Fan Choice Award	Nominated	
Juno Awards	2023	In the Meantime	Pop Album of the Year	Nominated	
MTV Europe Music Awards	2016	Herself	Best Push Act	Nominated	
MTV Europe Music Awards	2016	Herself	Best Canadian Act	Nominated	
MTV Europe Music Awards	2017	Herself	Best Canadian Act	Nominated	
MTV Europe Music Awards	2018	Herself	Best World Stage	Won	
MTV Europe Music Awards	2018	Herself	Best Canadian Act	Nominated	
MTV Europe Music Awards	2019	Herself	Best Canadian Act	Nominated	
MTV Video Music Awards	2016	"Wild Things"	Best Pop Video	Nominated	
MTV Video Music Awards	2017	"Scars to Your Beautiful"	Video of the Year	Nominated	
MTV Video Music Awards	2017	"Scars to Your Beautiful"	Best Fight Against The System	Won	
MTV Video Music Awards	2017	"Scars to Your Beautiful"	Best Direction	Nominated	
MTV Video Music Awards	2017	"Stay" (with Zedd)	Best Dance Video	Won	
MTV Video Music Awards	2018	"1-800-273-8255"(with Logic and Khalid)	Best Collaboration	Nominated	
MTV Video Music Awards	2018	"1-800-273-8255"(with Logic and Khalid)	Best Video with a Message	Nominated	
MTV Video Music Awards	2018	"Growing Pains"	Best Cinematography	Nominated	
MTV Video Music Awards Japan	2016	"Here"	Best R&B Video	Nominated	
Nickelodeon Kids' Choice Awards	2016	Herself	Favorite New Artist	Nominated	
Nickelodeon Kids' Choice Awards	2018	Herself	Favorite New Artist	Nominated	
People's Choice Awards	2017	Herself	Favorite Breakout Artist	Nominated	
Radio Disney Music Awards	2016	Herself	Breakout Artist of the Year	Nominated	
Radio Disney Music Awards	2017	Herself	Breakout Artist of the Year	Won	
Radio Disney Music Awards	2017	"Wild" (with Troye Sivan)	Best Crush Song	Nominated	
SOCAN Awards	2016	Herself	Breakout Artist	Won	
Soundie Music Video Awards	2018	"Growing Pains"	Best Art Direction	Won	
Streamy Awards	2015	"Here"	Original Song	Won	
Teen Choice Awards	2017	Herself	Choice Female Artist	Nominated	
Teen Choice Awards	2017	"Scars to Your Beautiful"	Choice Song: Female Artist	Nominated	
Teen Choice Awards	2017	"Stay" (with Zedd)	Choice Collaboration	Nominated	
