= Kuya Productions =

Canadian record producer (active 2002– )

Kuya Productions is a multi-platinum award-winning Canadian hip hop, R&B and pop production duo from Toronto, Ontario, consisting of Samuel T. Gerongco and Robert T. Gerongco (both sometimes credited without the "T.").

== Early life ==
Samuel T. Gerongco (Sammy) and Robert T. Gerongco (Bobby) were born in Toronto, Ontario. They are the sons of Felipe and Godofreda Gerongco, and brothers of America Patman.

Sammy's first big break as an actor/singer and dancer was in the original Canadian production of the Broadway musical Miss Saigon at the Princess of Wales Theatre in Toronto, which then led to a five-year run on Broadway in New York City. It was there that Sammy met Johann Camat (originally from Montreal) after both being cast in the production. Shortly after that, the group Kuya was formed when Sammy's younger brother Bobby joined after completing his program in music production. After beginning to develop their unique style and recording with producers in Los Angeles, New York City and Toronto, Kuya quickly caught the attention of internationally recognized producers (Wyclef Jean, Pharrell Williams, Timbaland), and record label executives within the North American Music Industry.

It was in New York that the brothers put their work as a group on hold to begin developing their craft as songwriters and producers.

== Career ==
In 2004, Kuya produced on two U.S. Top 10 albums including the No.1 Grammy nominated album Suit for hip hop artist Nelly, as well as Mase's Welcome Back album. Both would do extremely well, with Nelly reaching 3 million in sales worldwide (3× platinum) and Mase hitting gold (500,000 units). Jon Platt from EMI Music Publishing signed Kuya on in 2005.

Kuya Production's official releases include songs by Jesse McCartney, Kandi Burruss, Big Time Rush, Jordin Sparks, Girlicious, and Slim (singer). The year 2009 was devoted to the development and recording of their new R&B artist, JRDN. The next year was known as a breakout year for JRDN, including a top ten single, a number one hit on the Much Music charts, along with two Juno Award nominations. JRDN's second single "Like Magic", produced by Kuya, achieved a SOCAN award for the most played song on Urban Radio across the nation.

In 2011, Kuya was a part of Cover Me Canada, a Canadian reality television show which aired on CBC Television. Kuya came on as producers to work with the Cover Me Canada contestants.

== 2012-Present ==
In January 2012, Vancouver-native Terence (Tee) Lam joined Kuya as a producer and sound engineer.

Kuya's 2013 work included the release of JRDN's second studio album, as well as single releases for pop artist Karina Es. In 2015, Kuya wrote and produced for Canadian R&B singer Alessia Cara's debut album, Know-It-All, including her hit single "Here", which went #1 on the Hot R&B/Hip-Hop Songs, Rhythmic, Mainstream Top 40 and peaked at #5 on the Billboard Hot 100. Other songs they wrote for her debut album "Seventeen", "Overdose", "Stars" and "Outlaws". Cara's first time recording in a studio was with Kuya Productions and Sebastian Kole.

In 2016, Kuya produced on the song "F.U." on the #1 selling album Glory Days for girl group Little Mix. The album debuted at number one on the UK Albums Chart; it later became their first album to yield more than two top ten singles when the fourth single, "Power", reached number six on the UK Singles Chart. In January 2018 the album was certified triple platinum in the UK for shipments of 900,000 units.[2]

== Discography ==
Year	Single	Artist	Label	Work
2002	Get Ready	Shawn Desman	SONY/BMG	Producer
2002	Shook	Shawn Desman	SONY/BMG	Producer
2004	Wastin' My Time	Mase	Fo Reel Ent/Universal Records	Producer
2004	Together	Keshia Chanté	SONY/BMG	Producer
2004	In My Life	Nelly feat Mase	Fo Reel Ent/Universal Records	Producer
2005	Far Away	Ginuwine	Sony Urban Music	Producer
2007	Lovers Holiday	Cory Lee	Universal Records	Producer
2007	Ovaload	Cory Lee	Universal Records	Producer
2008	I Apologize	Slim	Virgin Records	Producer
2008	There	Kreesha Turner	Virgin Records	Producer
2008	Blow	Nicole Scherzinger	Interscope Records	Producer
2008	Rock You	Jesse McCartney	Hollywood Records	Producer
2009	Find Love	Akon	UpFront Records/Konvict	Producer
2009	Why	Sean Garrett	Interscope Records	Producer
2009	I Just Know	Kandi Burruss	Kandi Koated Ent/Asylum	Producer
2010	Count on You	Big Time Rush	Sony Music	Writer
2010	U can Have it All	JRDN	Kuya/Fontana North	Writer/Producer
2011	Bye Bye my Friend	Meisa Kuroki	Sony Music	Writer/Producer
2011	Life of the Party	Aleesia	A-Lista Music Inc/EMI	Producer
2011	100	Howie Dorough	Howie Do It Music Inc/Fontana North	Writer/Producer
2011	Like Magic	JRDN	Kuya/Fontana North	Producer
2012	Top It All	JRDN	Kuya/Fontana North	Producer
2013	Can't Choose feat Kardinal Offishall	JRDN	Kuya/Fontana North	Producer
2013	Under	Ahsan	EP/Interscope	Producer
2014	So Bad	Camron Nicki Minaj	Killa Ent	Producer
2015	Overdose	Alessia Cara	EP/Def Jam	Songwriter
2015	Stars	Alessia Cara	EP/Def Jam	Songwriter/Producer
2015	Outlaws	Alessia Cara	EP/Def Jam	Songwriter
2015	Seventeen	Alessia Cara	EP/Def Jam	Songwriter/Producer
2015	"Here" (Alessia Cara song)	Alessia Cara	EP/Def Jam	Songwriter
2016	"F.U." (Little Mix song)	Little Mix	Syco/Columbia	Songwriter/Producer
2017	Stay	EXO	S.M. Entertainment	Songwriter/Arranger
2018	Dinner	Suho	S.M. Entertainment	Songwriter
2018	Saviour	Daisy Gray	Velvet Tree/Faction/Kobalt Music Group	Songwriter/Producer
2019	Monologue	Taemin	S.M. Entertainment	Songwriter/Arranger
2019	Future Love	Katie	Axis	Songwriter/Producer
2019	Better Off	Katie	Axis	Songwriter/Producer
2019	Love Kills	Katie	Axis	Songwriter/Producer
2019	Thinkin Bout You	Katie	Axis	Songwriter/Producer
2019	Learn	Marco Mckinnis	Republic	Songwriter/Producer
2019	That's Okay	D.O.	SM Entertainment	Songwriter/Arranger
2019	With You	Meghan Trainor Kaskade	EPIC	Songwriter
2019	Wonderland	Christina Aguilera	RCA	Songwriter/Producer
2019	De Mi	CNCO	Sony Music	Songwriter/Producer
2019	Love Don't Hate It	Duncan Laurence	Universal Music	Songwriter
2020	Happy	Taeyeon	SM Entertainment	Songwriter
2020	U Should	Chika	Warner Brothers	Songwriter/Producer
2020	Ghosted	Benicio Bryant	Arista	Songwriter/Producer
2020	Sad Songs	Eric Ethridge	Anthem	Songwriter/Producer
2021	Tangerine	Benicio Bryant	Arista	Songwriter/Producer
2021	Good Old Days	Quest	Warner Records Philippines	Songwriter/Producer
2022	Aku Di Sini	Andi Bernadee	Warner Malaysia	Songwriter/Producer
2024	Water	Grace Kinstler	27 Entertainment	Songwriter/Producer
2025	Umaaligid	Sarah Geronimo SB19	G Music	Songwriter/Producer
