= Four Pink Walls =

EP by Alessia Cara
- Released: August 26, 2015
- Recorded: 2014–2015
- Length: 17:36
- Label: Def Jam
- Producer: Pop & Oak

Alessia Cara chronology
Four Pink Walls (2015)	Know-It-All (2015)

Singles from Four Pink Walls
- 1. "Here" Released: April 30, 2015

Four Pink Walls is the debut extended play (EP) by the Canadian singer-songwriter Alessia Cara. It was released on August 26, 2015 through Def Jam Recordings. With all songs containing writing by Cara, the preview of her debut studio album, Know-It-All (2015), was recorded from 2014 to 2015, and also includes major songwriting and production contributions from the R&B duo Pop & Oak.

Upon its release, the EP was positively received by music critics. Commercially, the EP peaked at number 11 on the Canadian Albums Chart, alongside charting at number 21 on the New Zealand Albums Chart and number 31 on the Billboard 200 in the United States. Its sole single, "Here", was also commercially successful, peaking at number 5 on the Billboard Hot 100 and also charting worldwide.

== Composition ==
A series of slow-tempo R&B and bouncy pop songs, Four Pink Walls feels "more like a personal manifesto than a party playlist", explains Brittany Spanos of Rolling Stone. It opens with the joyous "Seventeen", which was described by Spanos as a "savvy update" of the songs "At Seventeen" by Janis Ian and Fleetwood Mac's "Landslide". Containing big beat drums, a vocal loop, a simulated handclap, and rousing chords, the song regards Cara, singing with an annoyed attitude, listening to her parents and valuing her childhood. While being accepting, she responds to her mother's advice about staying grounded with "Yeah, I guess that sounded nice when I was 10." The song was written when Cara was about eighteen: "It was a whole bunch of feelings. We got to talking in the studio with my dad and Sebastian — we all came up with this thing, like, let’s write about how life goes by really fast. My dad brought up that idea, and that’s why the first line is, ’My daddy says that life comes at you fast.’" The track is followed by "Here", which displays Cara in a miserable experience at a party as an "anti-social pessimist" singing worryingly with samples of Portishead and Isaac Hayes and a minor key piano loop.

The rest of Four Pink Walls consist of retro-style soul tracks with Cara's vocals being resemblant to Amy Winehouse. A song about wanting to do anything for someone, including being a runaway with them, "Outlaws" includes bright, "burping" horn stab and tinkling, modern Motown-esque keys backing Cara singing that her boyfriend is "the shine into her star." The most pop-sounding track on the release is "I'm Yours", which was written on a guitar in New Jersey on a curb next to a garbage can. Initially a guitar ballad, Cara said that she had always want to write a happy love song that "that wasn’t nice — kind of like an ’eff you’ love song." With its "fluttery melodies and earthshaking chorus", it represents Cara being anti-social towards a guy and is "more poutily flirtatious than anything else", as Pitchfork Media's Jonah Bromwich writes.

The EP closes with the boom bap neo soul title track, noted by Bromwich to be most similar to "Here". Coming up with the idea of the song at the beginning of her career, Cara had written much of it during her increasing popularity: "I didn’t want to wait for the next album or the next project to put it out. I wanted to tell the story while it was happening." The rest of the song was written one day while driving to the studio. With elements of Lauryn Hill and Erykah Badu on her comfortable vocal delivery, the title song involves Cara singing over a breakbeat and humming synthesizer about her sudden popularity, saying that she went "from ‘when boredom strikes’ to ‘Ms. Star on the Rise". She also sings, "But those four pink walls, I kind of miss them, man", the "four pink walls" representing her bedroom, where she recorded her first clips she uploaded to YouTube that got her discovered by Def Jam.

== Release and promotion ==
Professional ratings
Aggregate scores
Source	Rating
Metacritic	74/100
Review scores
Source	Rating
Allmusic	4/5 stars
Exclaim!	7/10
Pitchfork	6.6/10
Rolling Stone	3.5/5 stars

Four Pink Walls, a preview of Cara's upcoming debut studio album, Know It All, was originally planned for release on Friday August 28, 2015, but the date was later moved two days before to Wednesday August 26. Cara reasoned, "We were like, let's just do it. I can't do it anymore, I just want to release everything, so I did… I thought it would be cool to surprise everyone and put it out early." The cover art was taken with Cara's iPhone. "Here" was issued as a single off the EP, becoming Cara's first top-20 Billboard hit upon reaching number 13 on the US Billboard Hot 100 chart in November 2015 and getting performed by Cara on The Tonight Show with Jimmy Fallon with house band The Roots. The song received an official video that was directed by Aaron A, and the other four songs on Four Pink Walls were accompanied with DIY-style videos by Cara herself. In North America, Four Pink Walls peaked at number eleven on the Canadian Albums Chart and 31 on the Billboard 200, while in New Zealand, the record peaked at number 21.

Reviews of Four Pink Walls were positive. On the review aggregate website Metacritic, Four Pink Walls scored a 74 out of 100, based on 4 critics. Exclaim critic Michael J. Warren called the EP good enough to have expectations for Cara's upcoming debut studio album, writing that she was best at, especially in her songwriting, her "anti-pop star polish and self-determined presentation". Andy Kellman, a journalist for Allmusic, awarded the record four out of five stars, describing it as "sturdy, fusing and switching between smart pop and R&B constructions as Cara sings about growing up and falling in love." The review also highlighted Pop & Oak's contributions to the EP, writing that they complemented their work for artists outside of Chrisette Michele, Alicia Keys, Tamia, and Elle Varner.

== Track listing ==
Credits adapted from Allmusic.

No.	Title	Writer(s)	Producer(s)	Length
1.	"Seventeen"	Alessia Caracciolo; Coleridge Tillman; Andrew "Pop" Wansel; Warren "Oak" Felder; William Robinson Jr.; Ronald White; Samuel Gerongco; Robert Gerongco	Pop & Oak; Kuya^{[a]}	3:33
2.	"Here"	Caracciolo; Tillman; Wansel; Felder; S. Gerongco; R. Gerongco; Terence Lam; Isaac Hayes	Pop & Oak; Sebastian Kole	3:19
3.	"Outlaws"	Caracciolo; Tillman; Wansel; Felder; S. Gerongco; R. Gerongco	Pop & Oak; Kole	3:23
4.	"I'm Yours"	Caracciolo; Tillman; Wansel; Felder	Pop & Oak; Kole	3:49
5.	"Four Pink Walls"	Caracciolo	Alan Nglish	3:32
Total length:				17:36

=== Notes ===
- ^{^[a]} signifies a co-producer.
- "Seventeen" contains an interpolation of "My Girl" by The Temptations, written by William Robinson Jr. and Ronald White.
- "Here" contains a sample from "Ike's Rap II", written and performed by Isaac Hayes.

== Charts ==
Chart (2015)	Peak position
Canadian Albums (Billboard)	11
New Zealand Albums (RMNZ)	21
US Billboard 200	31
