= Bruklin =

American singer-songwriter (born 2008)

- Born: Bruklin Muca; April 17, 2008 (age 18)
- Origin: Albania
- Genres: Pop; Alternative; Indie
- Occupations: Singer; Songwriter
- Instrument: Vocals
- Years active: 2024–present
- Label: Independent

Bruklin Muca (born April 17, 2008), known professionally as Bruklin, is an American singer-songwriter. She began releasing music in 2024.

== Early life ==
Bruklin was born on April 17, 2008, in Albania.

== Career ==
Her follow-up single "Magic Show" received coverage in music outlets for its themes of confidence and individuality.

In September 2024, she released "No Contact", produced by Oak Felder and written by Sebastian Kole.

She followed with "Good Cry" in December 2024, and "Good Girl Bad Dreams" in 2025.

== Discography ==
=== Singles ===
- "Stay Friends" (2024)
- "Magic Show" (2024)
- "No Contact" (2024)
- "Daydreaming" (2024)
- "Good Cry" (2024)
- "Good Girl Bad Dreams" (2025)
- "Under Your Skin" (2025)
- "Echo" (2025)
- "Cry a Little Louder" (2025)
- "Kinda Like" (2025)
- "Live Fast Cry Young" (2026)
- "Let's See" (2026)
- "Mine" (2026)
