= Hōgyū Jizō =

Japanese stone statues

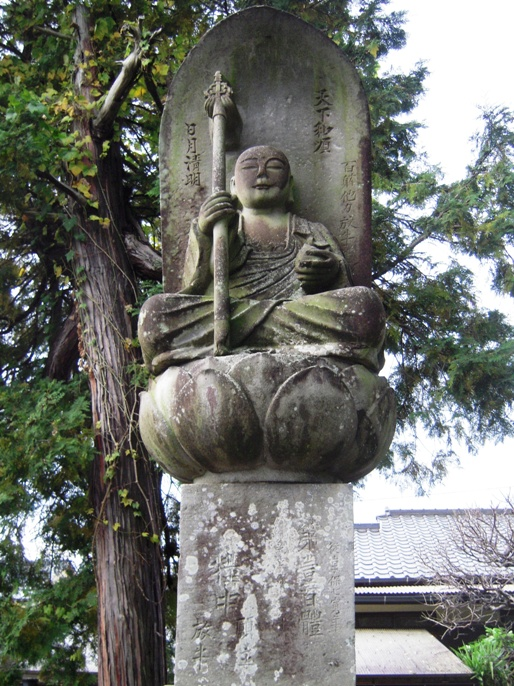
Hōgyū Jizō of Ōjō-in, Ikeda, Kumamoto, the 100th statue

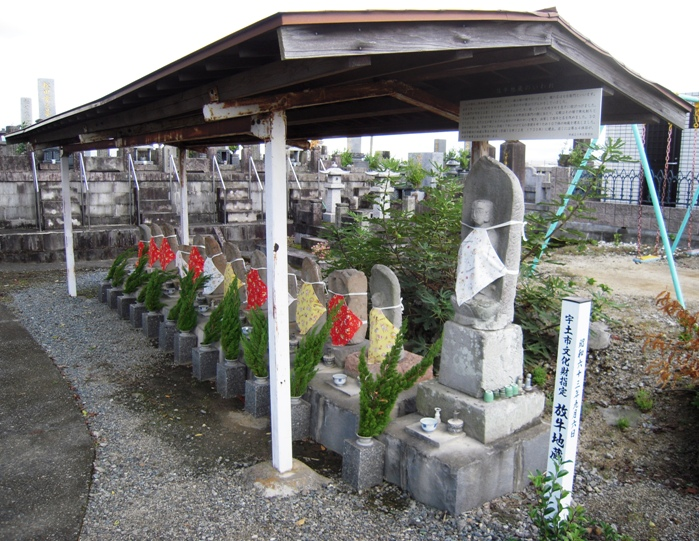
Hōgyū Jizō of Seian Temple in Uki city, Kumamoto Prefecture

Hōgyū Jizō (放牛地蔵) are Japanese stone statues, mostly representing the bodhisattva Ksitigarbha, made by Buddhist monk Hōgyū (around 1672–1732) between 1722 and 1732 in Kumamoto, Japan. When Hōgyū was about 14, in 1686, his father was killed by a samurai. Later he made stone statues for the repose of the soul of his father.

== Historical records ==
In January 1686, a blacksmith called Hichizaemon, a heavy drinker, threw a bamboo blower at his son. It accidentally hit the forehead of a samurai, Ohyano Genzaemon. Despite repeated apologies, Genzaemon immediately killed Hichizaemon with a sword, that being legal at the time by kiri sute gomen. Genzaemon, the son and his sister all wrote witness statements, and the Bugyō did not punish Genzaemon.

Out of grief, the son entered the Buddhist priesthood for the repose of his father, and offered a prayer with a vow that he would make 100 stone statues. He made 107 stone statues between 1722 and 1732. He died in 1732. The 100th statue was in Ōjō-in Temple in Kumamoto, and it was the largest statue (186 centimetres (73 in) high) among others standing on the big stone lotus.

== Stone statues ==
Most common are standing or sitting statues of Ksitigarbha with a monk's staff in the right hand and Cintamani in the left hand. There are other types of statues, such as Amitabha, Guanyin, Avalokitesvara, Bhaisajyaguru and mixtures of these statues. The height differs from the size of a person to 50 centimetres (20 in). Behind each statue is a boat-shaped Aureola on which is written "Tariki" ("Through the Buddha") and the sequence number of his statue such as the 100th, and the petitioner is Hōgyū.

== Another opinion ==
Hideo Nagata studied every statue of Hōgyū and stated that the Hōgyū was not the boy whose father was killed. The statues might be connected with the circumstances of the time such as famine.

== Table of Hōgyū Jizō ==
Number of production	Location	Kind of stone statue	Date of production and features such as engraved sentences
1	Idenakama	Sitting Ksitigarbha with Globus cruciger	May 1722, Hōgyū's determination of making Ksitigabha statues which leads to live in a country of comfort.
2	Chikami-machi	Standing Ksitigarbha with Globus cruciger	September 1722 with Douka
3	A park near Chorokubashi and Taiheibashi	Standing Ksitigarbha	In 1723 with Douka
4	Undiscovered	Undiscovered	Undiscovered
5	Hanaokayama road	Standing Ksitigarbha with Globus cruciger	In 1723, with Douka
6	Ikedamachi, Ōjō-in Temple	Standing Ksitigarbha with Namaste hands	In July 1723 with Douka
7	Tsuboi 4choume, Soushinji Temple	Ksitigarbha with Khakkhara on the right hand and Globus cruciger on the left hand.	With Douka
8	(A) Shimasaki 6chome, and (B) Shimasaki 5 chome	(A) Standing Ksitigarbha and (B) Standing Amitabha	In December 1723 with Douka
9	Kasuga 3chome	Standing Amitabha	February 1724
10	Kuhonji 1chome	Standing Ksitigarbha	Disappeared after raid
11	Undiscovered	Undiscovered	Undiscovered
12	Undiscovered	Undiscovered	Undiscovered
13	Kasuga 3chome	Standing Ksitigarbha with Globus cruciger	May
14	Murozono 2chome	Standing Standing Ksitigarbha with Globus cruciger	May, 1724 with Douka
15	Kyomachi 1chome, Aizomein Temple	Standing Gautama Buddha statue	Moved due to road construction
16	Saikumachi 4chome, Souzenji Temple	No statue, only footstone	July, 1724
17	Kinpozan Daishogun	Standing Ksitigarbha with Globus cruciger	August
18	Shimizumachi Tatsushoji Temple	Standing Ksitigarbha with Globus cruciger	Douka
19	Suizenji 4chome Watarize	Destroyed in raid, renewed	Doka on footstone
20	Kon-yamachi 3chome Shimogawara Park	Standing Ksitigarbha with a flag on the right hand, Globus cruciger on the left	Douka
21	Matsuo-machi	Standing Avalokitesvara	Douka
22	Ikeda 1chome Ikeda Hachiman	Standing Ksitigarbha with Globus cruciger	January, 1725, Douka
23	Hokubucho Kusuhara	Standing Ksitigarbha with Globus cruciger	July, 1725, Discovered in 1990
24	Akitamachi Goto	Standing Amitabha	Unreadable Douka
25	Yokote 4chome	Standing Ksitigarbha with Globus cruciger	August, 1725 with Douka
26	Kurokami 7chome Uruge	Standing 11 faced Guanyin with Censer	No Douka
27	Near Chorokubashi	Standing Ksitigarbha with Globus cruciger	No footstone
28	Undiscovered	Undiscovered	Undiscovered
29	Oe 1chome Zenkoji Temple	Standing Ksitigarbha with Globus cruciger	Douka
30	Hokubucho shimosuzurikawa(A),Tasaki Bridge(B)	Gautama Buddha statue(A)Ksitigarbha with Khakkhara on the right hand and Globus cruciger on the left hand(B)	Jan. 1726(B),Douka(A)
31	Hokubucho Kitasako	Standing Ksitigarbha with Khakkhara on the right hand and Globus cruciger on the left hand	July, 1726, with 8 names
32	Hokubucho Kajio	Standing Ksitigarbha with Globus cruciger	September, 1726 with 14 names, Confirmed in 1990
33	Yokotecho Shihoike	Standing Amitabha with stone crown	Unreadable Douka
34	Ikedacho Ikegami	Standing Ksitigarbha with Globus cruciger	No footstone
35	Asogun Kikinomura	Standing Amitabha	Douka, discovered in 1985
36	Uekimachi Mukausaka	Standing Ksitigarbha with Globus cruciger	May, 1727 with Douka
37	Undiscovered	Undiscovered	Undiscovered
38	Yokotecho Higashi Shihouike	Standing Ksitigarbha with Globus cruciger	June 1727 with Douka
39	Nihongi 3chome	Sitting Bhaisajyaguru	September
40	(A)Kikuchi-gun Shisuimachi (B)Kawachi-machi Odao	(A)(B)Standing Ksitigarbha with Globus cruciger	(A)Road Directing Post;Right is Waifu Town, February 1728
41	Kawachimachi Iwashita	Stupa and no statue	Douka, Road Directing Post
42	Daniyama, Disappeared by air raid	Unknown	Unknown
43	Mukaemachi 1chome	Standing Ksitigarbha with Globus cruciger	Road Direction Post (Satsuma and Hyuga)
44	shimizu Honmachi, Takaba Road	Standing Ksitigarbha with Namaste hands	April 1728 with Douka
45	Kotohira 2chome	Destroyed in air raid, parts remain	May 1728
46	Shin-yashiki 1chome Kongoji Temple	Standing Ksitigarbha but disappeared due to raid	June 1728 with Douka
47	Kurokami 2chome, near Seiseiko	Standing Ksitigarbha with Globus cruciger	July 1728 with Douka
48	Kasuga 2chome	Sitting Amitabha	September 1728
49	Hokubumachi Hida	Standing Ksitigarbha with Globus cruciger	September 1728,Crossroad pointing to Waifu and Kino
50	Kikuchi-gun, Shisuimachi	Standing Ksitigarbha with Globus cruciger	Road Direction Post pointing to Kumamoto
51	Kikuchi-gun, Hichijomachi Kae	Standing Ksitigarbha with Globus cruciger	September 1728 with Douka
52	Undiscovered	Undiscovered	Undiscovered
53	Kotohira Honcho	Standing Ksitigarbha with Globus cruciger	Road Direction Post pointing to Mifune
54	Ikeda 1chome	Standing Ksitigarbha with Globus cruciger	January 1729
55	Undiscovered	Undiscovered	Undiscovered
56	Mukaemachi, near Chorokubashi	Standing Ksitigarbha	Douka
57	Ozawamachi Seikoji Temple	Standing Ksitigarbha with Globus cruciger|	March 1729
58	Kasuga 2chome	Standing Ksitigarbha with Globus cruciger	1729
59	Kikuchi-gun Hichijo-machi, Mizushima	A mixture of 11 faced Guanyin and Amitabha	Road Direction Post pointing to Waifu
60	Motoyamacho, (now) Rendaiji-cho,now	Sitting Ksitigarbha with Khakkhara on the right hand and Globus cruciger on the left hand	February 1729 with Douka
61	Undiscovered	Undiscovered	Undiscovered
62	Yahatamachi Kawashiri Shrine	Standing Ksitigarbha with Globus cruciger	September 1729
63	Kawachimachi Seita	Standing Ksitigarbha with Globus cruciger	August 1729
64	Shimomashiki-gun, Tomiaimachi Kihara Fudoson	Standing Ksitigarbha with Globus cruciger	September 1729
65	Nishigoshicho, Nonoshima, Yagu Shrine	Standing Ksitigarbha with Globus cruciger	September 1729 with Douka
66	Kikuchi-gun, Kikuyocho, Haramizu,	Standing Ksitigarbha with Khakkhara on the right hand and Globus cruciger on the left hand	September 1729
67	Tsuboi 5chome	No statue due to raid but only footstone remains	October 1729 with Douka
68	Tasaki Crossing near Kumamoto Station	Disappeared	Disappeared
69	Honjo 2chome Kasuga Sekkyosho	Standing Ksitigarbha with Globus cruciger	October 1729 with Douka
70	Chisoku Temple but disappeared in raid	Disappeared	Disappeared
71	Ikeda 1chome Iwatate	Previously Nyoirin-Kannon(air raid and replaced by another)	December 1729 with Douka
72	Tamana-gun, Gyokuto machi Harakura Honmachi	Standing Ksitigarbha with Globus cruciger	January 17 Rediscovered in 1990
73	Yokote 3chome	Sitting Amitabha	February 1730 with Douka (in Document)
74	Inside a rock of Ueki town	Sitting Amitabha	March 1730 with Douka
75	Nishigoshi town Kuroishi	Standing Ksitigarbha with Globus cruciger	March 1715 with Douka
76	Tamana-gun Nagashu machi Ishimiya	Standing Ksitigarbha with Globus cruciger	April 1730 with Douka, Jizō Festival observed
77	Kamimashiki-gun, Mashiki-machi Koga	Standing Ksitigarbha with Globus cruciger	May 1730 Jizō Festival observed
78	Ikeda 1chome	Parts remaining due to raid	March 1730
79	Kasuga 3chome	Standing Ksitigarbha	Douka
80	Hokubu machi Kamao, Inside wall	Standing Ksitigarbha	September
81	Kamoto-gun Kikukacho, Terada	Standing Ksitigarbha with Globus cruciger	September 1730, Discovered in 1973
82	Senba machi	Standing Avalokitesvara	Douka, Jizō festival observed
83	Uki city Matsubara machi, Seian Temple	Standing Ksitigarbha with Globus cruciger	December 1730, Discovered in 1986
84	Kawachi machi Node	Standing Ksitigarbha with Globus cruciger	January 1731, Discovered in 1983
85	Matsuo machi Chikazu	Standing Ksitigarbha with Globus cruciger	January 1731
86	Shimasaki 2chome	Sitting Amitabha	February 1731
87	Kawashiri machi Oowatari Park	Sitting Amitabha	March 1731, Discovered in 1982, Jizō festival observed
88	Takahashi machi Tensha Shrine	Standing Ksitigarbha with Globus cruciger	April 1731
89	Tosaka machi Community Center	Standing 11-faced Guanyin	May 1731 with Douka
90	Ozawa machi Seifukuji Temple	Standing Ksitigarbha with Khakkhara on the right hand and Globus cruciger on the left hand	1731, the biggest among Hōgyū Jizōs
91	Ikegami cho	Sitting Amitabha	June 1731
92	Oe 4chome Korenori Shrine	A mixture of Guanyin and Ksitigarbha	May 1731 with Douka
93	Ezu, Nakanose,	Sitting Ksitigarbha with Globus cruciger	July 1731
94	Hokubucho Otsuka	Standing Ksitigarbha with Globus cruciger	1731 with Douka, Jizō festival observed
95	Toshima machi Kitamuku	Sitting Ksitigarbha with Globus cruciger	September 1731
96	Hokubucho Akinamazu	Guanyin on the head part, and otherwise, standing Amitabha	October 1731 with Douka
97	Kawachi machi Kuroishi	Sitting Ksitigarbha on rock	Douka, Discovered in 1982
98	Kamimashiki-gun, Yabe machi Uehata	Standing Ksitigarbha with Globus cruciger	November 1731, Jizō festival observed. Discovered in 1975
99	Ikegamicho, Taniozaki	Sitting Amitabha	November 1731 with Douka
100	Ikeda 2chome, Ojoin Temple	Sitting Ksitigarbha with Khakkhara on the right hand and Globus cruciger on the big stone lotus	1732, The 100th statue with Douka
101	Undiscovered	Undiscovered	Undiscovered
102	Kawachi machi, Tomon Temple	Standing Avalokitesvara over the neck and Amitabha under the neck	April 1732 with Douka
103	Kamimashikigun, Kashima-machi Namazu, Koon Temple	Standing Ksitigarbha with Globus cruciger	April 1732, Douka unclear, Discovered in 1974, Hougyu festival observed
104	Chikami-machi	Only footstone, which served two Hōgyū Jizōs	Discovered in 1970
105	Hieda-machi, Hieda-kannondo	Standing Ksitigarbha with Globus cruciger	August 1732
106	Tsunoura-cho, Community Center	Standing Ksitigarbha with Globus cruciger	September 1732
107	Kamimashiki-gun, Mashiki-cho, Tanigo Community Center	Standing Ksitigarbha with Globus cruciger	October 1732 with Douka
Others	Kasugamachi and other places	Various kinds of Hōgyū Jizōs	There are 8 Hōgyū Jizōs without numbers, In one, 1726
Grave of Hōgyū	Yokote 5 chome	Sitting monk-shaped statue with Khakkhara on the right hand and Buddhist prayer beads on the left hand	Dated November 8, 1732 by the builder of the grave. Discovered in 1938

== Poems ==
The following are douka, or didactic poems, of Hōgyū:

Those who are rich and those who are not, differ in the present world, but they are the same after death. (19th statue)

You who speak to us, and we who are spoken to, both are of transient existence like dreams. (75th statue)

A cow without a bridle (Hōgyū) which carries Sattva on its back, leads people to a country of Buddha. (38th, 67th, 71st, 73rd, and 74th statues)

Hōgyū is like a bathhouse, the people in the world are like those who bath in the bathhouse. (14th statue)

A burglar and I who met burglary, are the same on the same Padma (attribute). (22nd statue)

A break comes, which leads us to the future, not the past; come rain any time, blow wind at any time. (3rd statue)

In the present world, like both sides of leaves which receive wind, things go in one way or another. (29th statue)

People' tongue is sweet, like candy or sugar or licorice; Amitabha is not sweet, though not outspoken. (60th statue)

If you ask me what I am, I will answer either I am mountain or river, but if you ask me what my heart is, I do not know how to answer. (24th statue)

Before bowing Kami or Buddha, you should bow your parents, there is nothing like parents, who are like Buddha. (41st, 44th and 51st stone statues.)
