= 2016 MTV Video Music Awards =

Award ceremony

- Date: Sunday, August 28, 2016 at 9:00–11:54pm EDT
- Venue: Madison Square Garden (Midtown Manhattan, Manhattan, New York City)
- Country: United States
- Most awards: Beyoncé (8)
- Most nominations: Beyoncé (11)
- Website: www.mtv.com/vma

Television/radio coverage
- Network: MTV; MTV2; VH1; MTV Classic; BET; CMT; Centric; Comedy Central; Logo TV; Spike; TV Land
- Produced by: Garrett English; Jesse Ignjatovic
- Directed by: Hamish Hamilton

The 2016 MTV Video Music Awards were held on Sunday night, August 28, 2016 at 9:00–11:54pm EDT at Madison Square Garden in Midtown Manhattan, Manhattan, New York City. Adele's "Hello" was the most nominated video with seven categories. This marked the 33rd edition of the live broadcast. Beyoncé led all winners with eight awards. Rihanna received the Michael Jackson Video Vanguard Award after performing several medley numbers during the ceremony. Britney Spears marked her first performance at the awards show since the heavily criticized 2007 show nine years prior. Beyoncé won eight awards to bring her career total of wins to 25 VMAs, overtaking Madonna's previous record of 20 awards, making her the artist with the most wins in the history of the award show.

The ceremony was shown on multiple Viacom cable networks and through smart TV and mobile devices which allow access to MTV's TV Everywhere-authenticated live stream within their app (dependent upon provider), along with MTV's website and Facebook Live.

Compared to the previous year's show which had a lesser amount of Viacom networks simulcasting the ceremony, the 2016 ceremony's numbers showed a 35% drop across the measured networks carrying the ceremony, making it the lowest rated ceremony in MTV's 32-year history beating out 1996 and 2015, totalling a cumulative 6.5 million viewers (being later beaten by the 2017 edition), though the network also claimed substantial additional streaming viewership across MTV apps and Facebook Live. 3.3 million viewers saw the show via MTV.

== Performances ==
List of musical performances
Artist(s)	Song(s)
Pre-show
Alessia Cara; Troye Sivan	"Wild Things" "Wild" "Scars to Your Beautiful"
Jidenna	"Little Bit More"
Lukas Graham	"Mama Said"
Main show
Rihanna	"Don't Stop the Music" "Only Girl (In the World)" "We Found Love" "Where Have You Been"
Ariana Grande; Nicki Minaj	"Side to Side"
Future	"Fuck Up Some Commas"
Rihanna	"Rude Boy" "What's My Name?" "Work" "Pon de Replay"
Nick Jonas; Ty Dolla Sign	"Bacon"
Beyoncé	Lemonade Medley: "Pray You Catch Me" "Hold Up" (contains excerpts from "Countdown") "Sorry" "Don't Hurt Yourself" "Formation"
Britney Spears; G-Eazy	"Make Me" "Me, Myself & I"
Rihanna	"Needed Me" "Pour It Up" "Bitch Better Have My Money"
The Chainsmokers; Halsey	"Closer"
Rihanna	"Stay" "Diamonds" "Love on the Brain"

== Presenters ==
=== Pre-show ===
- DJ Khaled – host
- Charlamagne Tha God and Lizzo – co-hosts
- Lizzo – presented Song of Summer

=== Main show ===
- Sean "Diddy" Combs — presented Best Hip-Hop Video
- Hailee Steinfeld — spoke about Best New Artist voting procedures
- Chance the Rapper — introduced Ariana Grande and Nicki Minaj
- Alicia Keys — presented Best Male Video
- Michael Phelps — introduced Future
- Kanye West — premiered "Fade" music video
- Naomi Campbell — introduced Rihanna's second performance
- Rita Ora and Ansel Elgort — introduced Nick Jonas and Ty Dolla $ign
- Serena Williams — introduced Beyoncé
- Bebe Rexha and Tove Lo — presented the winners of professional categories
- Jaden Smith and Shameik Moore — presented Best Collaboration Video
- Kim Kardashian — introduced Britney Spears and G-Eazy
- Simone Biles, Laurie Hernandez, Madison Kocian and Aly Raisman — presented Best Female Video
- Tracee Ellis Ross — introduced Rihanna's third performance
- Fifth Harmony — presented Best New Artist
- Alessia Cara and Troye Sivan — introduced The Chainsmokers and Halsey
- Jimmy Fallon — presented Video of the Year
- Mary J. Blige — introduced Rihanna's final performance
- Drake — presented the Video Vanguard Award to Rihanna

In addition, Keegan-Michael Key and Jordan Peele provided commentary throughout the show from a luxury box as characters @LizardSheeple and @TheShamester. DJ Khaled, Nicole Byer, and Jay Pharoah also provided insight and commentary throughout the broadcast.

== Winners and nominees ==
This year's nominees were presented on July 26, 2016, on MTV's Facebook page live.

Winners are highlighted in Bold

Video of the Year	Best Male Video
**Beyoncé — "Formation"**; Adele — "Hello"; Justin Bieber — "Sorry"; Drake — "Hotline Bling"; Kanye West — "Famous"	**Calvin Harris (featuring Rihanna) — "This Is What You Came For"**; Drake — "Hotline Bling"; Bryson Tiller — "Don't"; The Weeknd — "Can't Feel My Face"; Kanye West — "Famous"
Best Female Video	Best New Artist
**Beyoncé — "Hold Up"**; Adele — "Hello"; Ariana Grande — "Into You"; Rihanna (featuring Drake) — "Work"; Sia — "Cheap Thrills"	**DNCE**; Desiigner; Zara Larsson; Lukas Graham; Bryson Tiller
Best Pop Video	Best Rock Video
**Beyoncé — "Formation"**; Adele — "Hello"; Justin Bieber — "Sorry"; Alessia Cara — "Wild Things"; Ariana Grande — "Into You"	**Twenty One Pilots — "Heathens"**; All Time Low — "Missing You"; Coldplay — "Adventure of a Lifetime"; Fall Out Boy (featuring Demi Lovato) — "Irresistible"; Panic! at the Disco — "Victorious"
Best Hip-Hop Video	Best Electronic Video
**Drake — "Hotline Bling"**; 2 Chainz — "Watch Out"; Chance the Rapper (featuring Saba) — "Angels"; Desiigner — "Panda"; Bryson Tiller — "Don't"	**Calvin Harris and Disciples — "How Deep Is Your Love"**; 99 Souls (featuring Destiny's Child and Brandy) — "The Girl Is Mine"; Afrojack — "SummerThing!"; The Chainsmokers (featuring Daya) — "Don't Let Me Down"; Mike Posner — "I Took a Pill in Ibiza"
Best Collaboration Video	Breakthrough Long Form Video
**Fifth Harmony (featuring Ty Dolla Sign) — "Work from Home"**; Beyoncé (featuring Kendrick Lamar) — "Freedom"; Ariana Grande (featuring Lil Wayne) — "Let Me Love You"; Calvin Harris (featuring Rihanna) — "This Is What You Came For"; Rihanna (featuring Drake) — "Work"	**Beyoncé — Lemonade**; Justin Bieber — Purpose: The Movement; Chris Brown — Royalty; Florence + The Machine — The Odyssey; Troye Sivan — Blue Neighbourhood Trilogy
Best Direction	Best Choreography
**Beyoncé — "Formation" (Director: Melina Matsoukas)**; Adele — "Hello" (Director: Xavier Dolan); David Bowie — "Lazarus" (Director: Johan Renck); Coldplay — "Up&Up" (Directors: Vania Heymann and Gal Muggia); Tame Impala — "The Less I Know the Better" (Director: Canada)	**Beyoncé — "Formation" (Choreographers: Chris Grant, JaQuel Knight and Dana Foglia)**; Beyoncé — "Sorry" (Choreographers: Chris Grant, JaQuel Knight, Dana Foglia, Anthony Burrell & Beyoncé Knowles Carter); Missy Elliott (featuring Pharrell) — "WTF (Where They From)" (Choreographer: Hi-Hat); FKA Twigs — M3LL155X (Choreographer: Aaron Sillis, Benjamin Milan, Kenrick Sandy and FKA Twigs); Florence + The Machine — "Delilah" (Choreographer: Holly Blakey)
Best Visual Effects	Best Art Direction
**Coldplay — "Up&Up" (Visual Effects: Vania Heymann and GloriaFX)**; Adele — "Send My Love (To Your New Lover)" (Visual Effects: Jonathan Box and MPC); FKA Twigs — M3LL155X (Visual Effects: Lewis Saunders and Jihoon Yoo); The Weeknd — "Can't Feel My Face" (Visual Effects: Louis Mackall and T.J. Burke); Zayn — "Pillowtalk" (Visual Effects: David Smith)	**David Bowie — "Blackstar" (Art Director: Jan Houllevigue)**; Adele — "Hello" (Art Director: Colombe Raby); Beyoncé — "Hold Up" (Art Director: Jason Hougaard); Drake — "Hotline Bling" (Art Director: Jeremy MacFarlane); Fergie — "M.I.L.F. $" (Art Director: Alexander Delgado)
Best Editing	Best Cinematography
**Beyoncé — "Formation" (Editor: Jeff Selis)**; Adele — "Hello" (Editor: Xavier Dolan); David Bowie — "Lazarus" (Editor: Johan Söderberg); Fergie — "M.I.L.F. $" (Editor: Vinnie Hobbs); Ariana Grande — "Into You" (Editor: Hannah Lux Davis)	**Beyoncé — "Formation" (Director of Photography: Malik Sayeed)**; Adele — "Hello" (Director of Photography: André Turpin); Alesso — "I Wanna Know" (Director of Photography: Corey Jennings); David Bowie — "Lazarus" (Director of Photography: Crille Forsberg); Ariana Grande — "Into You" (Director of Photography: Paul Laufer)
Song of Summer
**Fifth Harmony (featuring Fetty Wap) — "All in My Head (Flex)"**; The Chainsmokers (featuring Halsey) — "Closer"; Drake (featuring Kyla and Wizkid) — "One Dance"; Selena Gomez — "Kill Em with Kindness"; Calvin Harris (featuring Rihanna) — "This Is What You Came For"; Nick Jonas (featuring Ty Dolla Sign) — "Bacon"; Kent Jones — "Don't Mind"; Major Lazer (featuring Justin Bieber and MØ) — "Cold Water"; Sia — "Cheap Thrills"; Justin Timberlake — "Can't Stop the Feeling!"
Michael Jackson Video Vanguard Award
**Rihanna**

== Artists with multiple wins and nominations ==
Artists who received multiple awards
Wins	Artist
8	Beyoncé
2	Calvin Harris
2	Fifth Harmony
2	Rihanna

Artists who received multiple nominations
Nominations	Artist
11	Beyoncé
8	Adele
7	Drake
5	Ariana Grande
5	Rihanna
4	Calvin Harris
4	David Bowie
4	Justin Bieber
3	Bryson Tiller
3	Coldplay
2	Desiigner
2	Fergie
2	Fifth Harmony
2	FKA Twigs
2	Florence + The Machine
2	Kanye West
2	Sia
2	Ty Dolla Sign
2	The Chainsmokers
2	The Weeknd

== Music Videos with multiple wins and nominations ==
Music Videos that received multiple awards
Wins	Artist	Music Video
6	Beyoncé	"Formation"

Music Videos that received multiple nominations
Nominations	Artist(s)	Music Video
7	Adele	"Hello"
6	Beyoncé	"Formation"
4	Ariana Grande	"Into You"
4	Drake	"Hotline Bling"
3	Calvin Harris (featuring Rihanna)	"This Is What You Came For"
3	David Bowie	"Lazarus"
2	Beyoncé	"Hold Up"
2	Bryson Tiller	"Don't"
2	Coldplay	"Up&Up"
2	Fergie	"M.I.L.F. $"
2	FKA Twigs	M3LL155X
2	Justin Bieber	"Sorry"
2	Kanye West	"Famous"
2	Rihanna (featuring Drake)	"Work"
2	Sia	"Cheap Thrills"
2	The Weeknd	"Can't Feel My Face"

== See also ==
- 2016 MTV Europe Music Awards
