= Dōka =

Ethical Japanese waka

A dōka (道歌, "way poem") is an ethical Japanese waka with a lesson. Well-versed poems of dōka contain the central dogma, appealing to Japanese people and easy to memorize.

== Popularity in Japanese culture ==
There is a wide range of dōka and its contents are said to cover not only lessons but also worldly wisdom. The writers of dōka are recorded to be many, but some of them composed originally tanka and their tanka was interpreted by others as dōka.

=== Writers ===
Ninomiya Sontoku, Ikkyū, Arakida Moritake, Itō Jinsai, Musō Soseki, Shimazu Tadayoshi, Ōta Nanpo, Matsudaira Sadanobu, Tokugawa Mitsukuni, Yoshida Shōin, Chikamatsu Monzaemon, Takuan, Takizawa Bakin, Hirata Atsutane, Ōta Dōkan, Saigyō Hōshi, Kyokutei Bakin, Yamaoka Tesshū, Watanabe Kazan, Yamanoue no Okura, Fujiwara no Teika, Sen no Rikyū, Sakamoto Ryōma, Nakae Tōju, Rennyo, Minamoto no Sanetomo, Chikamatsu Monzaemon, Takuan Sōhō, Sugawara no Michizane, Nichiren, Hon'inbō Sansa Motoori Norinaga and many others.

== History ==
- Anrakuan Sakuden (安楽庵策伝?, 1554 – February 7, 1642) was an Edo period Japanese priest of the Jōdo-shū (Pure Land) of Buddhism; and a poet. He wrote a book Seisuisho (醒睡笑, "Laughs to Wake You Up"), which is a collection of humorous anecdotes. In volume 3 of this book, the word Douka was first used. However, the Japanese have liked composing Tankas with lessons from time immemorial. Later, Ishida Baigan started Shingaku (心学, "heart learning") and used Dōka in his religious movement. Dōka is remembered in everyday life of Japanese.

== Coverage ==
Sanjiro Kimura collected many dōka under the following classifications.

- Morality; small kindness, honesty, robbery, faithless love, friendship, flattery, etc.
- Art of Living; Travel, Health, etc.
- Wisdom; Wisdom in living, etc.
- How to live; Lies, etc.
- Progress of People;
- Money and Fortune;
- Parents and Children, Siblings, Couples;
- Life;
- Heart and Religion;
- Others;

== Examples ==
Japanese:

明日ありと思ふ心のあだ桜夜半に嵐の吹かぬものかは （親鸞）
なせばなるなさねばならぬ何事もならぬは人のなさぬなりけり(上杉鷹山）
やって見せ、言って聞かせて、させてみて、誉めてやらねば、人は動かじ」(山本五十六)
山川の末に流るる橡殻も身を捨ててこそ浮かぶ瀬もあれ(空也)
折々に遊ぶ暇（いとま）はある人の 暇なしとて書（ふみ）読まぬかな（本居宣長）
無き名ぞと人には言いてありぬべし 心の問はいかが応えむ（読み人知らず）
気もつかず目にも見えね 何時となく ほこりのたまる袂（たもと）なりけり（読み人知らず）
待て暫し 恨みな果てそ君を守る 心のほどは 行末を見よ（熊野神社の神様 玉葉和歌集）
世の中に人を育つる心こそ 我を育つる心なりけり （荒木田守武 世の中百首）
説く人の重き軽きをかえりみず 善き言の葉を 我が物とせよ（読み人しらず）

Rōmaji:

Asuarito Omoukokorono Adazakura Yowani Arashino Fukanumonokawa Shinran
Nasebanaru Nasanebanaranu Nanigotomo Naranuwahitono Nasanunarikeri Uesugi Yozan
Yattemise, Ittekikasete, Sasetemite, Hometeyaraneba Hitowa Ugokaji Isoroku Yamamoto
Yamakawano Sueninagaruru Tochigaramo Miosutetekoso Ukabusemoare Kuya
Oriorini Asobuitomawa Auhitono Itomanashitote Fumiyomanukana Motoori Norinaga
Nakinazoto Hitoniwa Iite Arinubeshi Kokoronotoiwa Ikagakotaemu (Unknown composer)
Kimotsukazu Minimomienedo Itsutonaku Hokorinotamaru Tamotonarikeri (Unknown composer)
Mateshibashi Uraminahateso Kimiwomamoru Kokoronohodowa Yukusuewo Miyo Kami of Kumano Shrine
Yononakani Hitowosodatsuru Kokorokoso Warewosodatsuru Kokoronarikeri （Arakida Moritake)
Tokuhitono Omokikarokiwo Kaerimizu Yokikotonohano Wagamonotoseyo (Unknown composer)

Translation:

Shinran was determined to enter the Buddhist priesthood. Cherry blossoms were in full blossom. It was in the evening and his senior monk said the ceremony would be made on the next day. Shinran made the following Tanka which meant that it should be made right now; if otherwise, on the following night, a typhoon might blow and I might die, or I might change my mind.
If you put your mind to it, you can do it;If you do not, you cannot -- that is true for all things. When something cannot be done, you are the one to blame For not putting your heart into it. Uesugi Yozan
You should do it yourself before him, you should tell him to do it, you should let him hear it, you should let him do it, and you should praise him, then, you let him do it. Isoroku Yamamoto
You must be prepared to sacrifice yourself, then you will find a way, when you meet difficulties. Kuya
You have plenty of time playing something. You are not reading books saying you have no time. Why ? (Reading books is recommended)(Motoori Norinaga)
The rumor that that person and I are in love is groundless, but what should I answer, if the question is to my conscience. (Unknown composer in Gosenshu)
Your conscience is little by little benumbed without you knowing it. (Unknown composer)

Don't bear a grudge against Kami. Wait some more time, and you will find fortune. (Kami of Kumano Shrine in Gyokuyo Wakashu)

The heart with which one educates other persons is the same which educates myself. Learn by teaching someone else. (Moritake Araida from Yononaka Hyakushu)

Someone who reminds you of your defects is precious, regardless of the position of the adviser. (Unknown composer)
