= Scars to Your Beautiful =

Single by Alessia Cara

from the album Know-It-All
- Released: July 26, 2016
- Recorded: 2015
- Studio: Glenwood Place Studios (Burbank, CA)
- Genre: Synth-pop
- Length: 3:50
- Label: Def Jam
- Songwriters: Alessia Caracciolo; Warren Felder; Coleridge Tillman; Andrew Wansel; Justin Franks
- Producers: Pop & Oak; Sebastian Kole; DJ Frank E

Alessia Cara singles chronology
"Wild" (2016)	"Scars to Your Beautiful" (2016)	"How Far I'll Go" (2016)

Music video
- "Scars to Your Beautiful" on YouTube

"Scars to Your Beautiful" is a song recorded by the Canadian singer-songwriter Alessia Cara. Def Jam Recordings and Universal Music Group serviced it to contemporary hit radio on July 26, 2016, as the third single from her debut studio album, Know-It-All (2015). A synth-pop ballad, the song was recorded in 2015 at Glenwood Place Studios, based in Burbank, California, and was written by Cara herself, alongside the song's producers, Pop & Oak, Sebastian Kole and DJ Frank E. Lyrically, the song is about body positivity.

Upon its release, the song was received positively by music critics, who praised the song for its empowering message and lyrics. Commercially, the single charted at number 14 in Cara's home country of Canada. In the United States, "Scars to Your Beautiful" peaked at number eight. It marked Cara's second top-ten single on the Billboard Hot 100. It also reached the top ten in Australia, Iceland, Slovenia and Sweden, and topped five Billboard charts and the German Airplay chart. Additionally, the single was certified Diamond in Brazil, 6× Platinum in the United States, and 5× Platinum in Australia.

The music video for the song was directed by Aaron A, who had previously produced the music video for her song "Wild Things", and was released on the 11th of July, 2016. An extended play (EP) of remixes was released for the song, containing remixes from NOTD and others. The song itself was nominated for numerous awards, including four MTV Video Music Awards, winning in the Best Fight Against the System category. It was also nominated an iHeartRadio Music Award for Best Lyrics, an iHeartRadio MMVA for Canadian Single of the Year, and a Teen Choice Awards in the Choice Music – Female Artist category.

== Background ==
Cara felt motivated to make the song after viewing an episode of Botched. In an interview with Idolator's Mike Wass, Cara stated about the process behind the song:

"Basically, that song is about body image. It's directed at women, but I think men can relate to it as well. It's just a song about these things that certain women go through on a daily basis in order to feel loved or in order to love themselves. I think that's such a thing that goes on in today's world. These weird things are instilled in us. You know? They tell us that we’re not good enough or that there's only one kind of beauty. This song basically is contradicting that idea. It's saying, 'Well, if the world doesn't like how you look then they should change. They should change their perspective. You don’t have to change yourself.' I mean, I thought that that was important, you know, just to put out next. Especially because I think that's kind of the direction we're going in, you know, with 'Here'. 'Here' was about not belonging anywhere and 'Wild Things' was about finding a space you belong. Now 'Scars To Your Beautiful' is basically about embracing yourself and finally coming to that conclusion where you feel love and you can love yourself. I think it's cool to put out third because I feel like I have a bigger platform now. The point of the song is to reach as many women, or people, as possible."

Cara also noted that the song was inspired by Christina Aguilera's 2002 ballad "Beautiful".

== Critical reception ==
2016 VOA newscast on "Scars to Your Beautiful"
An August 2016 Voice of America newscast on "Scars to Your Beautiful"

The Guardian's Kitty Empire said that "There's substance on Scars to Your Beautiful, where Cara tackles the beauty myth à la Beyoncé. The verses pack some good stuff – 'What's a little bit of hunger? I can go a little bit longer.'" and later went on to say "the thumping motivational chorus merely suggests we are all stars." Katy Iandoli of Idolator stated "'Scars to Your Beautiful' is a modern-day version of TLC's 'Unpretty', in its acknowledgment of the beauty in both visible and invisible imperfections."

Billboard ranked "Scars to Your Beautiful" at number 77 on their Billboard's 100 Best Pop Songs of 2016: Critics' Picks" list, commenting “Body-positivity anthems typically don't get this dark, but on "Scars To Your Beautiful", Alessia Cara isn't afraid to talk cutting, tears and eating disorders, before getting to the uplifting chorus, where she delivers some of the most empowering, horizon-expanding lyrics of this year: ‘You don't have to change a thing / The world could change its heart.'"

== Commercial performance ==
=== Canada ===
Upon its release, the single charted at number 14 on the Canadian Hot 100. It also charted at number 5 on the CHR/Top 40 chart and number 3 on the Canada AC chart, and peaked at the top of the Hot AC chart. It would eventually be certified 8× Platinum by Music Canada (MC) for equivalent sales of 640,000 units in the country. By the end of 2016, the single was positioned at number 70 on the Canadian Hot 100.

=== United States ===
In the United States, the single charted at number 8 on the Billboard Hot 100, at number 14 on the Rhythmic Airplay chart and number 9 on the Dance Club Songs chart. It peaked at the top of four Billboard charts in the country, including the Adult Contemporary chart, the Adult Pop Airplay chart, the Dance/Mix Show Airplay chart and the Pop Airplay chart. It would eventually be certified 6× Platinum by the Recording Industry Association of America (RIAA) for equivalent sales of 6,000,000 units in the United States. By the end of 2017, the single was positioned at number 30 on the Billboard Hot 100, number 10 on both the Dance/Mix Show Airplay chart and the Mainstream Top 40 chart, and number 4 on both the Adult Contemporary chart and the Adult Top 40 chart. By the end of 2018, the single was positioned at number 33 on the Adult Contemporary chart.

=== Europe ===
In Austria, the single charted at number 18 on the Ö3 Austria Top 40. In Belgium, the single charted at number 18 on the Ultratip Bubbling Under chart in Wallonia and peaked at number 17 on the same chart in Flanders. In the Czech Republic, the single charted at number 32 on the Singles Digitál Top 100 chart and peaked at number 3 on the Rádio – Top 100 chart. In Denmark, the single charted at number 37 on the Tracklisten chart and was certified 2× Platinum by IFPI Danmark (IFPI DEN) for equivalent sales of 180,000 units in the country. In France, although the single did not chart, it was certified Platinum by the SNEP for equivalent sales of 200,000 units in the country. In Germany, the single charted at number 19 on the GfK Entertainment charts and peaked at the top of the German airplay chart. In Iceland, the single charted at number 4 on the Ríkisútvarpið chart. By the end of 2017, the single was positioned at number 36 on the chart.

In Ireland, the single charted at number 39 on the Irish Singles Chart. In Italy, although the single did not chart, it was certified 2× Platinum by Federazione Industria Musicale Italiana (FIMI) for equivalent sales of 100,000 units in the country. In the Netherlands, the single charted at number 30 on the Single Top 100 chart and peaked at number 7 on the Dutch Top 40 chart. By the end of 2017, the single was positioned at number 36 on the chart. In Norway, although the single did not chart, it was certified Platinum by IFPI Norge (IFPI NOR) for equivalent sales of 100,000 units in the country. Poland, the single charted at number 35 on the Polish Airplay Top 100 chart and was certified 2× Platinum by the Polish Society of the Phonographic Industry (ZPAV) for equivalent sales of 100,000 units in the country. In Portugal, the single charted at number 18 on the Portuguese Singles Chart and was certified 2× Platinum by Associação Fonográfica Portuguesa (AFP) for equivalent sales of 20,000 units in the country.

In Scotland, the single charted at number 27 on the Scottish Singles Chart. In Slovakia, the single charted at number 37 on their Singles Digital Top 100 chart and peaked at number 7 on their Rádio – Top 100 chart. In Slovenia, the single charted at number 9 on the SloTop50 chart. By the end of 2017, the single was positioned at number 25 on the chart. In Spain, although the single did not chart, it was certified Platinum by Productores de Musica de Espana (PROMUSICAE) for equivalent sales of 60,000 units in the country. In Sweden, the single charted at number 10 on the Sverigetopplistan chart and was certified 3× Platinum by Grammofon Leverantörernas Förening (GLF) for equivalent sales of 120,000 units in the country. By the end of 2016, the single was positioned at number 92 on the chart. In Switzerland, the single charted at number 18 on the Schweizer Hitparade chart. By the end of 2017, the single was positioned at number 74 on the chart. In the United Kingdom, the single charted at number 55 on the UK singles chart and was certified 2× Platinum by the British Phonographic Industry (BPI) for equivalent sales of 1,200,000 units in the country.

=== Other countries ===
In Australia, the single charted at number 8 on the ARIA Charts and was certified 5× Platinum by the Australian Recording Industry Association (ARIA) for equivalent sales of 350,000 units in the country. By the end of 2017, the single was positioned at number 87 on the chart. In Brazil, although the single did not chart, it was certified Diamond by Pro-Música Brasil (PMB) for equivalent sales of 250,000 units in the country. In New Zealand, the single charted at number 15 on the Official Aotearoa Music Charts and was certified 5× Platinum by Recorded Music New Zealand (RMNZ) for equivalent sales of 150,000 units in the country.

== Music video ==
The song's music video, directed by Aaron A, was published on July 11, 2016, with a cameo appearance by fellow singer JoJo. As of September 24, 2025, the video currently has over 156,000,000 views and 3,300,000 likes.

=== Background ===
On the concept of the music video, Cara said in an interview with Cosmopolitan: "I wanted to do this kind of video for a very long time. Since we had this song — and since we knew it was going to be a single — I had this vision of many different cinematic shots of different kinds of people. I wanted all kinds of people — young, old, whatever their situation, whether it's visible scars, non-visible scars — just a bunch of different women, and there are some men in there as well because it can reach out to guys too. But I wanted real shots of real people telling their stories, and showing the story through little vignettes."

== Usage in media ==
- The song is featured in episodes of the television shows The Bold Type, Law & Order: Special Victims Unit and Family Law.
- The song was used in the international trailer of A Wrinkle in Time, as well as the background music for the introduction video of Dirt Rally 2.0.
- In 2018, the song was featured in television commercials for ULTA Beauty.
- In 2026, the song was featured in advertisements for Kisqali.

== Track listing ==
- CD Single
1. "Scars to Your Beautiful" – 3:50
2. "Scars to Your Beautiful" (NOTD Remix) – 3:19
- Digital download – Remixes
1. "Scars to Your Beautiful" (Luca Schreiner Remix) – 4:22
2. "Scars to Your Beautiful" (NOTD Remix) – 3:19
3. "Scars to Your Beautiful" (Cages Remix) – 4:28
4. "Scars to Your Beautiful" (Joe Mason Remix) – 3:51
5. "Scars to Your Beautiful" (recycle jordan Remix) – 3:32

== Personnel ==
- Alessia Cara – vocals, backing vocals
- Sebastian Kole – keyboards, programming
- Oak Felder – keyboards, programming
- Pop Wansel - programming, drum programming

== Charts ==
=== Weekly charts ===
Chart (2016–2017)	Peak position
Australia (ARIA)	8
Austria (Ö3 Austria Top 40)	18
Belgium (Ultratip Bubbling Under Flanders)	17
Belgium (Ultratip Bubbling Under Wallonia)	18
Canada Hot 100 (Billboard)	14
Canada AC (Billboard)	4
Canada CHR/Top 40 (Billboard)	5
Canada Hot AC (Billboard)	1
Czech Republic Airplay (ČNS IFPI)	3
Czech Republic Singles Digital (ČNS IFPI)	32
Denmark (Tracklisten)	37
Germany (GfK)	19
Germany (Airplay Chart)	1
Iceland (RÚV)	4
Ireland (IRMA)	39
Italy (FIMI)	31
Netherlands (Dutch Top 40)	7
Netherlands (Single Top 100)	30
New Zealand (Recorded Music NZ)	15
Poland Airplay (ZPAV)	35
Portugal (AFP)	18
Scottish Singles Sales (Official Charts)	27
Slovakia Airplay (ČNS IFPI)	7
Slovakia Singles Digital (ČNS IFPI)	37
Slovenia (SloTop50)	9
Sweden (Sverigetopplistan)	10
Switzerland (Schweizer Hitparade)	18
UK Singles (Official Charts)	55
US Billboard Hot 100	8
US Adult Contemporary (Billboard)	1
US Adult Pop Airplay (Billboard)	1
US Dance Club Songs (Billboard)	9
US Dance Airplay (Billboard)	1
US Pop Airplay (Billboard)	1
US Rhythmic Airplay (Billboard)	14

=== Year-end charts ===
Chart (2016)	Position
Sweden (Sverigetopplistan)	92
Chart (2017)	Position
Australia (ARIA)	87
Canada (Canadian Hot 100)	70
Iceland (Tónlistinn)	36
Latvia Airplay (LaIPA)	71
Netherlands (Dutch Top 40)	36
Slovenia (SloTop50)	25
Switzerland (Schweizer Hitparade)	74
US Billboard Hot 100	30
US Adult Contemporary (Billboard)	4
US Adult Top 40 (Billboard)	4
US Dance/Mix Show Airplay (Billboard)	10
US Mainstream Top 40 (Billboard)	10
Chart (2018)	Position
US Adult Contemporary (Billboard)	33

== Certifications ==
Region	Certification	Certified units/sales
Australia (ARIA)	5× Platinum	350,000^{‡}
Brazil (Pro-Música Brasil)	Diamond	250,000^{‡}
Canada (Music Canada)	8× Platinum	640,000^{‡}
Denmark (IFPI Danmark)	2× Platinum	180,000^{‡}
France (SNEP)	Platinum	200,000^{‡}
Germany (BVMI)	3× Gold	600,000^{‡}
Italy (FIMI)	2× Platinum	100,000^{‡}
New Zealand (RMNZ)	5× Platinum	150,000^{‡}
Norway (IFPI Norway)	Platinum	60,000^{‡}
Poland (ZPAV)	2× Platinum	100,000^{‡}
Portugal (AFP)	2× Platinum	20,000^{‡}
Spain (Promusicae)	Platinum	60,000^{‡}
Sweden (GLF)	3× Platinum	120,000^{‡}
United Kingdom (BPI)	2× Platinum	1,200,000^{‡}
United States (RIAA)	6× Platinum	6,000,000^{‡}
^{‡} Sales+streaming figures based on certification alone.

== Release history ==
List of release dates, showing region, format(s), label(s) and reference(s)
Region	Date	Format	Version	Label	Ref.
United States	July 26, 2016	Digital download	Original	Def Jam; UMG	
United States	July 26, 2016	Top 40 radio	Original	Def Jam	
United States	October 21, 2016	Digital download	Remixes EP	Def Jam	
United Kingdom	November 8, 2016	Top 40 radio	Original	Def Jam	
Italy	December 2, 2016	Radio airplay	Original	UMG	
DACH	January 20, 2017	CD single	Original	Def Jam; UMG	

== See also ==
- List of Billboard Adult Contemporary number ones of 2017
