= Umaaligid =

2025 single by Sarah Geronimo and SB19

Single by Sarah Geronimo and SB19
- Language: Filipino; English
- English title: Lingering
- Released: July 30, 2025
- Genre: Pop rock
- Length: 3:40
- Label: G-Music
- Songwriters: Adam Pondang; Thyro Alfaro; Joshua Daniel Nase; Samuel Gerongco; Robert Gerongco
- Producers: Sarah Geronimo; Thyro Alfaro; Radkidz (Pablo & Josue); Kuya; Adam-Josh

Sarah Geronimo singles chronology
"Life's a Beautiful Game" (2024)	"Umaaligid" (2025)

SB19 singles chronology
"Dam" (2025)	"Umaaligid" (2025)	"Visa" (2026)

Music video
- "Umaaligid" on YouTube

"Umaaligid" (transl. Lingering) is a song recorded by Filipino singer and actress Sarah Geronimo and Filipino boy band SB19. It was co-written by Geromino alongside Adam Pondang, Joshua Daniel Nase, Robert Gerongco, Samuel Gerongco, and Thyro Alfaro. She also co-produced it with Alfaro, Radkidz (Note: Radkidz (stylized in all caps) is composed of SB19's Pablo and his brother Joshua Daniel Nase, who is also known as Josue.), Kuya, and AdamJosh. Characterized by its upbeat and energetic sound, the track features a confrontational pop rock production that addresses themes of disinformation, fake news, and media manipulation. The lyrics further explore betrayal within close personal circles. G-Music released it on July 30, 2025, marking the label's inaugural release.

Elijah Pareño of Rolling Stone Philippines praised it for its bold creative choices and departure from the typical styles of both artists. He highlighted its raw emotional tone and commended the collaboration for portraying both acts in a new, risk-taking light.

A music video, directed by Simon Te, premiered alongside the release. Presented as a crime-themed narrative film, it is set at a house party that turns into a crime scene following the mysterious murder of a man named Victor.

== Background and release ==
A collaboration between Sarah Geronimo and SB19 was first revealed in October 2024. On July 18, 2025, Geronimo officially announced their joint single, "Umaaligid", along with its release date of July 30. A teaser for the accompanying music film was released shortly thereafter. On July 27, Geronimo's husband, Matteo Guidicelli, announced the launch of their independent record label, G-Music. A day before the song's release, on July 29, an additional teaser video was unveiled, featuring Geronimo and SB19 posing for mugshots at a police department.

G-Music released "Umaaligid" on July 30, through digital download and streaming formats, marking the label's first release and Geronimo's first collaboration with the band. The official music film was also released later that day.

== Composition and lyrics ==
"Umaaligid" is 3 minutes and 40 seconds long, while its extended version is 14 seconds longer. Geromino alongside Adam Pondang, Joshua Daniel Nase, Robert Gerongco, Samuel Gerongco, and Thyro Alfaro. She also co-produced it with Alfaro, Radkidz, Kuya, and AdamJosh. Musically, the song is characterized for its confrontational and pop rock production.

Beyond its upbeat and energetic sound, the song explores themes related to the spread of disinformation and fake news, and the influence of media manipulation. The lyrics also address issues of trust and betrayal within personal relationships, extending beyond romantic contexts to reflect on the consequences of being deceived by someone within one’s close circle. It blends commanding vocals from Geronimo with assertive rap verses from SB19, creating a track that is both musically dynamic and socially resonant.

== Music video ==
Simon Te directed the music video for "Umaaligid", which premiered on YouTube on July 30, 2025, the same day the song was released. Presented as a 10-minute cinematic film, the video is set at a house party that turns into a crime scene following the mysterious murder of the antagonist, Victor. Geronimo and SB19 members—Pablo, Josh, Stell, Ken, and Justin—become suspects in the investigation.

At the party, tensions escalate as Victor provokes the group. He cheats in a poker game against Ken and Josh, then smashes Stell's father's prized guitar, which was signed by Pepe Smith. He also mocks Justin and his family with disrespectful jokes and knocks over his drink. He is also the new love interest of Lily, who is Pablo's supposed ex-girlfriend and Geronimo's sister. Josh initially defends Victor, but eventually loses his composure. When Victor attempts to assault Lily, Geronimo intervenes to protect her. Later, the group confronts Victor at the back of the mansion and retaliates. Each member takes turns attacking him until he is left unconscious on the ground, after which they walk away from his body. The video ends with Geronimo and the SB19 members being questioned by police, during which they admit to the killing.

== Reception ==
"Umaaligid" received praise for its bold creative choices and departure from the typical styles of both artists. Writing for Rolling Stone Philippines, Elijah Pareño highlighted Geronimo's measured rap delivery and SB19's "dramatic performance" as standout elements. He described the chorus delivery as raw and foreboding, and noted that the track breaks away from conventional pop structures in favor of a darker, emotionally grounded narrative. Pareño concluded that the collaboration cast both acts in a new light, portraying them not just as performers but as artists willing to take creative risks.

Commercially, "Umaaligid" debuted on Billboard's World Digital Song Sales chart at number four. This was regarded by the magazine as a "chart-breaking" achievement, given that it was achieved with only two days of tracking on the chart. It also debuted on the Philippines Hot 100 chart, placing at number 49. The song also placed on the Official Charts Company's UK Singles Downloads and Sales charts, peaking at 47 and 50, respectively.

== Accolades ==
Awards and nominations for "Umaaligid"
Award	Year	Category	Result	Ref.
Awit Awards	2026	Best Collaboration Performance	Nominated	
Awit Awards	2026	Best Dance/Electronic Recording	Nominated	
Filipino Music Awards	2025	Pop Song of the Year	Nominated	
P-pop Music Awards	2025	Collaboration of the Year	Won	
Wish 107.5 Music Awards	2026	Wish Song Collaboration of the Year	Won	

== Track listing ==
Digital download and streaming

1. "Umaaligid" – 3:40
2. "Umaaligid" (extended version) – 3:54

== Credits and personnel ==
Credits are adapted from Spotify.

- Sarah Geronimo – vocals, producer
- SB19 – vocals
- Adam Pondang – songwriter
- Joshua Daniel Nase – songwriter
- Robert Gerongco – songwriter
- Samuel Gerongco – songwriter
- Thyro Alfaro – songwriter, producer
- Radkidz (Pablo & Josue) – producer
- Kuya – producer
- AdamJosh – producer

== Charts ==
Chart performance for "Umaaligid"
Chart (2025)	Peak position
Philippines Hot 100 (Billboard)	49
UK Singles Downloads (OCC)	47
UK Singles Sales (OCC)	50
US World Digital Song Sales (Billboard)	4

== Listicles ==
Name of publisher, year listed, name of listicle, and placement
Publisher	Year	Listicle	Placement	Ref.
Billboard Philippines	2025	25 Best Filipino Songs of 2025	Placed	
