= How Far I'll Go =

Song from the 2016 film Moana

Song by Auliʻi Cravalho

from the album Moana: Original Motion Picture Soundtrack
- Released: November 18, 2016
- Genre: Pop; show tune
- Length: 2:43
- Label: Walt Disney
- Songwriter: Lin-Manuel Miranda
- Producer: Mark Mancina

"How Far I'll Go" and its reprise are two musical numbers from Disney's 2016 animated musical feature film Moana. A pop record, the song was written by Lin-Manuel Miranda, with additional music and production by Mark Mancina on its reprise. The song was performed in the film by American actress and singer Auliʻi Cravalho in her role as the movie's titular character.

It was released along with the album on November 18, 2016. Canadian singer Alessia Cara also recorded the song for the Moana soundtrack. The song won the Grammy Award for Best Song Written for Visual Media at the 60th Annual Grammy Awards and was nominated for Best Original Song at the 89th Academy Awards and Best Original Song at the 74th Golden Globe Awards, but lost both to "City of Stars" from La La Land.

== Composition ==
"How Far I'll Go" was composed as Moana's "I Want" song, following in the long tradition of "I Want" songs in 1990s Disney animated musicals. It replaced an earlier attempt called "More", for which the demo version recorded by Marcy Harriell was released as an outtake on the deluxe version of the soundtrack album. Although Miranda has stressed that he is still "very proud of" the song as a first draft, "More" was not good enough in retrospect because it merely expressed Moana's vague desire to see more since she had already figured out everything about the island. In contrast, Miranda feels that "How Far I'll Go" expresses a deeper, richer message: Moana's struggle with the irresistible impulse to explore beyond the reef notwithstanding her genuine love for her island, her family, and her people. As Miranda explained to People: "To me that's much more complicated than, 'I hate it here and I want to get out,' ... To say, 'I love it here, I love my parents, but why can't I stop walking to the ocean and fantasizing about getting out of here?' And questioning that instinct? It's even more confusing. And that's a valid story too."

To make himself write a song more compelling than "More", Miranda "went method". According to Miranda, he locked himself in his childhood bedroom at his parents' residence for an entire weekend in order to force his mind back to age 16 (the same age as Moana in the film), a time when he was facing what seemed like an "impossible distance" between the reality of his pleasant middle-class childhood which had no connection to show business whatsoever, and his dreams of a career in show business. He was well aware that he was composing the next Disney "I Want" song after "Let It Go" and that whatever he wrote had to be different from it.

According to the sheet music published at Sheetmusicdirect.com by Disney Music Company, "How Far I'll Go" is a moderate tempo of 82 beats per minute. Written in common time, the song is in the key of E major with a key change to F major for the final 10 measures. Auliʻi Cravalho's vocal range spans from B_{3} to D_{5} during the song. Moana's part from the end of "I Am Moana (Song of the Ancestors)", another song that also shares the last two notes from "How Far I'll Go", features the final 10 measures as part of Moana's melody.

== International versions ==
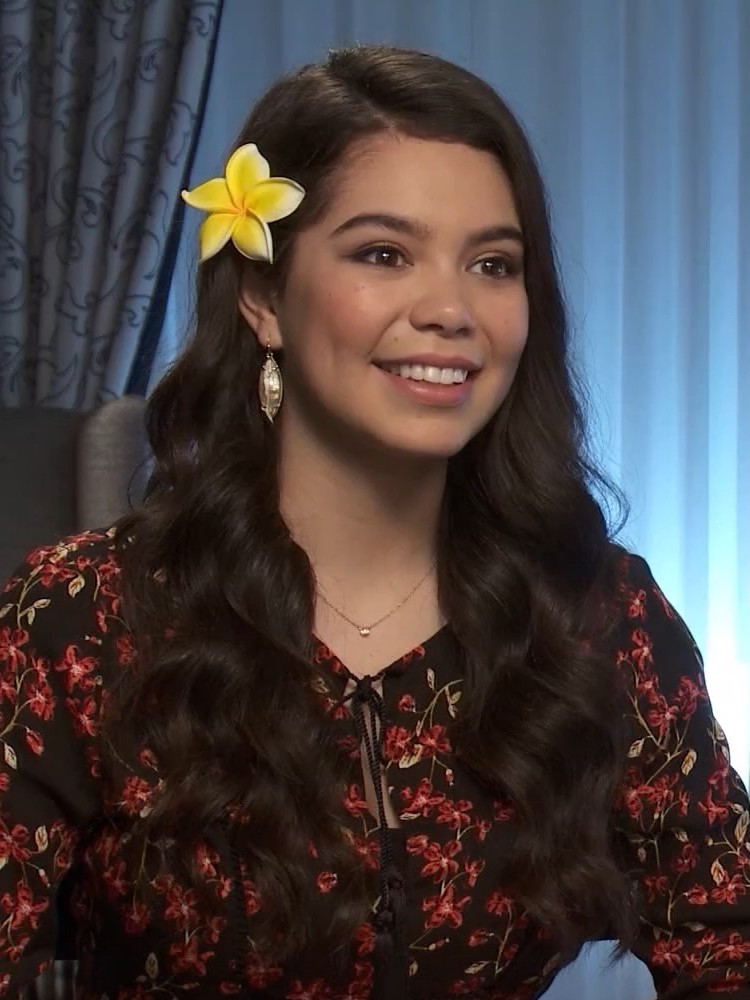
Auliʻi Cravalho reprised her role in 2018 voicing Moana in the Hawaiian dubbing of the movie

When the movie had its first theater release worldwide, the song numbered 44 versions, including a special Tahitian-language adaptation created specifically for the movie. For promotional purposes, South African singer Lira and Filipino singer and actress Janella Salvador recorded their own English-language versions of the song, while Indonesian singer Maudy Ayunda and Malaysian singer Ayda Jebat recorded their own versions of the song respectively in Indonesian and Malay language.

On December 15, a 5-languages mash-up was released online, featuring singers from Southeast Asian countries: Janella Salvador from the Philippines, Maudy Ayunda from Indonesia, Myra Molloy from Thailand, Ayda Jebat from Malaysia and Trần Minh Như from Vietnam. Shortly thereafter, a 24-languages video was released on Disney's Vevo channel.

In June 2017, a Māori-language version of the movie, featuring four voice-actors from the original English cast, was announced. Three weeks later, New Zealander Jaedyn Randell was introduced as Moana's voice. The movie was released in September 2017. In the same year, Shruti Rane (Hindi) reprised her role in the Bengali-language version of the movie. In November 2017, a Hawaiian-language dubbing was announced to be under way, with Auliʻi Cravalho reprising her role as Moana. The movie premiered on June 10, 2018.

Highlighted versions were released later than 2016.

"How Far I'll Go" worldwide
Language	Performer	Title	Translation
Arabic	كارمن عصام سليمان (Carmen Essam Suleiman)	"المجهول يناديني" ("Almajhul inadini")	"The unknown calls me"
Bengali	श्रुति राणे (Shruti Rane)	"আমার লক্ষ্য" ("Aamar lakshya")	"My goal"
Bulgarian	Михаела Маринова (Mihaela Marinova)	"По пътя мой" ("Po pŭtya moĭ")	"On my way"
Cantonese	Cecilia So	"尋我的路" ("Chàhm ngóh dīk louh")	"Find my own path"
Catalan	Ana Fernández Pellicer	"On aniré"	"Where I will go"
Croatian	Mia Negovetić	"Što dalje"	"What’s further away"
Czech	Michaela Tomešová	"Co je tam dál"	"What's next"
Danish	Clara Rugaard	"Hvor langt min verden når"	"How far my world reaches"
Dutch	Vajèn van den Bosch	"Ooit zal ik gaan"	"Sometime I’ll go"
English	Auliʻi Cravalho	"How far I’ll go"	
Estonian	Kelly Tulvik	"Kui kaugel see"	"How far it is"
Finnish	Yasmine Yamajako	"Taivaanrantaan"	"Into the horizon"
Flemish	Laura Tesoro	"Ooit zal ik gaan"	"Sometime I’ll go"
French	Cerise Calixte	"Le bleu lumière"	"The gleam-blue"
German	Debby van Dooren	"Ich bin bereit"	"I am ready"
Greek	Μαρίνα Σάττι (Marína Sátti)	"Αν θα την βρω" ("An tha tin vro")	"If I'll find it"
Hawaiian	Auliʻi Cravalho	"Ka loa nō"	"The great distance"
Hebrew	משי קלינשטיין (Meshi Kleinstein)	"כמה רחוק" ("Kama rachok")	"How far"
Hindi	श्रुति राणे (Shruti Rane)	"मंजिल हैं जो" ("Manzil hai jo")	"Where my destination is"
Hungarian	Faluvégi Fanni	"Ahogy csillan a távoli fény"	"How the distant shine gleams"
Icelandic	Agla Bríet Einarsdóttir	"Hve langt ég fer"	"How far I'll go"
Indonesian	Miranti Anna Juantara	"Seberapa jauh ku melangkah"	"How far I step"
Italian	Chiara Grispo	"Oltre l’orizzonte"	"Beyond the horizon"
Japanese	屋比久知奈 (Tomona Yabiku)	"どこまでも ～ How Far I'll Go" ("Doko made mo ~ How far I'll go")	"To the ends of the earth ~ How far I'll go"
Kazakh	Назерке Серікболова (Nazerke Serikbolova)	"Бірақ қайда барам" ("Biraq qayda baram")	"Where do I go"
Korean	김소향 (Kim So-Hyang)	"나 언젠간 떠날 거야" ("Na ŏnjen-gan ttŏnal gŏya")	"When will I leave"
Latvian	Vanda Siliņa	"Cik tālu došos es"	"How far do I go"
Lithuanian	Dorotėja Kravčenkaitė	"Plauksiu iš čia"	"I'll sail from here"
Malay	Mae Elliessa	"Bawaku berkelana"	"Take me wander"
Mandarin Chinese (China)	刘美麟 (Liú Měi-Lín)	"能走多远" ("Néng zǒu duō yuǎn")	"How far I’ll go"
Mandarin Chinese (Taiwan)	吳以悠	"海洋之心" ("Hǎiyáng zhī xīn")	"The heart of the sea"
Māori	Jaedyn Randell	"Tukuna au"	"I was released"
Norwegian	Nora Gjestvang	"Hvor langt jeg må"	"How far I need"
Polish	Weronika Bochat	"Pół kroku stąd"	"Half a step away"
Portuguese (Brazil)	Any Gabrielly	"Saber quem sou"	"To know who I am"
Portuguese (Europe)	Sara Madeira	"Onde irei ter"	"Where I will get to"
Romanian	Ana Bianca Popescu	"E viața mea"	"It's my life"
Russian	Зинаида Куприянович (Zinaida Kupriyanovich)	"Что меня ждёт" ("Chto menya zhdyot")	"What awaits me"
Serbian	Ivona Rambosek (Ивона Рамбосек)	"Пучине зов" ("Pučine zov")	"Call of the high seas"
Slovak	Monika Potokárová	"Svet plný krás, naozaj mám"	"This beautiful world is truly mine"
Slovene	Katja Ajster	"Do kod naj grem"	"Where should I go"
Spanish (Europe)	María Parrado	"Qué hay más allá"	"What’s beyond"
Spanish (Latin America)	Sara Paula Gómez Arias	"Cuán lejos voy"	"How far I go"
Swedish	Wiktoria Johansson	"Vad jag kan nå"	"What I can reach"
Tahitian	Sabrina Laughlin	"E fano ai au"	"I will go"
Tamil	M. Haripriya	"செல்வேனோ" ("Celvēṉō")	"Will I go"
Thai	ไมร่า มณีภัสสร มอลลอย (Myra Molloy)	"ห่างเพียงใด" ("Hang-phiang-dai")	"How far is it"
Turkish	Ezgi Erol	"Uzaklara"	"To far off places"
Ukrainian	Маргарита Мелешко (Margarita Meleshko)	"Ця далина така ясна" ("Tsya dalyna taka yasna")	"This expanse is so bright"
Vietnamese	Trần Minh Như (Myra Tran)	"Chặng đường bao xa"	"How far the way is"

== Accolades ==
Awards
Award	Category	Result	Ref.
Critics' Choice Awards (22nd)	Best Song	Nominated	
St. Louis Gateway Film Critics Association (13th)	Best Song	Nominated	
Houston Film Critics Society (10th)	Best Original Song	Nominated	
Golden Globe Awards (74th)	Best Original Song	Nominated	
Grammy Awards (60th)	Best Song Written for Visual Media	Won	
Academy Awards (89th)	Best Original Song	Nominated	

== Charts and certifications ==
=== Weekly charts ===
Chart (2016–2017)	Peak position
Australia (ARIA)	49
Canada (Canadian Hot 100)	53
New Zealand Heatseekers (Recorded Music NZ)	1
Scottish Singles Sales (Official Charts)	20
UK Singles (Official Charts)	55
US Billboard Hot 100	41

=== Year-end charts ===
Chart (2017)	Position
US Digital Songs (Billboard)	42

=== Certifications ===
Region	Certification	Certified units/sales
Brazil (Pro-Música Brasil)	2× Diamond	500,000^{‡}
Canada (Music Canada)	5× Platinum	400,000^{‡}
Denmark (IFPI Danmark)	Gold	45,000^{‡}
France (SNEP)	Diamond	333,333^{‡}
Germany (BVMI)	Gold	200,000^{‡}
Italy (FIMI)	Gold	35,000^{‡}
New Zealand (RMNZ)	3× Platinum	90,000^{‡}
Spain (Promusicae)	Gold	30,000^{‡}
United Kingdom (BPI)	3× Platinum	1,800,000^{‡}
United States (RIAA)	8× Platinum	8,000,000^{‡}
^{‡} Sales+streaming figures based on certification alone.

== Alessia Cara version ==
"How Far I'll Go"

Single by Alessia Cara

from the album Moana: Original Motion Picture Soundtrack and Know-It-All
- Released: November 3, 2016
- Genre: Synth-pop; tropical house
- Length: 2:55
- Label: Walt Disney; Def Jam
- Songwriter: Lin-Manuel Miranda
- Producers: Oak Felder; Trevorious

Alessia Cara singles chronology
"Scars to Your Beautiful" (2016)	"How Far I'll Go" (2016)	"Stay" (2017)

Music video
- "How Far I'll Go" on YouTube

The Canadian singer-songwriter Alessia Cara recorded "How Far I'll Go" for the Moana soundtrack, with the song being released ahead of the soundtrack on October 28, 2016. It was included in the deluxe edition of Know-It-All released in Asia.

=== Critical reception ===
Rolling Stone's Brittany Spanos called the song "inspirational and sweet" and went on to say "the uplifting song is a perfect fit into the Disney canon, with Cara belting lyrics about persevering to achieve her dreams in spite of her imperfections or detractors." US magazine Rap-Up said "the empowering anthem allows the Canadian songstress to deliver outstanding vocals about overcoming adversity to reach for goals" and labeled it "a song with a message" and an "emotionally-charged track." Taylor Weatherby of Billboard dubbed it a "bouncy, uplifting tune." Idolator's Mike Wass said "the inspiring anthem is the perfect antidote to the general ugliness of 2016" and called it "a soaring ballad."

=== Music video ===
The official music video for the song, directed by Aya Tanimura, was released on November 3, 2016. Derek Lawrence of Entertainment Weekly described the video: "The video finds Cara roaming an empty beach as she belts out lyrics that reflect the film's plot about a young Polynesian girl setting sail for an epic adventure." The video was filmed at El Matador Beach in Malibu, California.

=== Charts ===
==== Weekly charts ====
Weekly chart performance for Alessia Cara recording
Chart (2016–2017)	Peak position
Australia (ARIA)	15
Austria (Ö3 Austria Top 40)	58
Belgium (Ultratip Bubbling Under Flanders)	1
Belgium (Ultratip Bubbling Under Wallonia)	19
Canada Hot 100 (Billboard)	46
Czech Republic Singles Digital (ČNS IFPI)	29
Denmark (Tracklisten)	29
Germany (GfK)	53
Hungary (Rádiós Top 40)	31
Ireland (IRMA)	26
Italy (FIMI)	51
Japan Hot 100 (Billboard)	67
Malaysia (RIM)	13
Netherlands (Dutch Tipparade 40)	4
Netherlands (Single Top 100)	26
New Zealand (Recorded Music NZ)	3
Norway (VG-lista)	10
Portugal (AFP)	40
Scottish Singles Sales (Official Charts)	80
Slovakia Singles Digital (ČNS IFPI)	36
Sweden (Sverigetopplistan)	7
Switzerland (Schweizer Hitparade)	66
UK Singles (Official Charts)	49
US Billboard Hot 100	56

==== Year-end charts ====
Year-end chart performance for Alessia Cara recording
Chart (2017)	Position
Australia (ARIA)	76
Denmark (Tracklisten)	70
New Zealand (Recorded Music NZ)	22
Sweden (Sverigetopplistan)	23

=== Certifications ===
Region	Certification	Certified units/sales
Australia (ARIA)	3× Platinum	210,000^{‡}
Brazil (Pro-Música Brasil)	2× Platinum	120,000^{‡}
Canada (Music Canada)	3× Platinum	240,000^{‡}
Denmark (IFPI Danmark)	Platinum	90,000^{‡}
Italy (FIMI)	Platinum	50,000^{‡}
New Zealand (RMNZ)	3× Platinum	90,000^{‡}
Norway (IFPI Norway)	3× Platinum	180,000^{‡}
Poland (ZPAV)	Platinum	50,000^{‡}
Spain (Promusicae)	Gold	30,000^{‡}
Sweden (GLF)	3× Platinum	120,000^{‡}
United Kingdom (BPI)	Platinum	600,000^{‡}
United States (RIAA)	3× Platinum	3,000,000^{‡}
^{‡} Sales+streaming figures based on certification alone.

=== International versions ===
In many versions of Moana, Alessia Cara's version of the song played during the end credits. However, several localized adaptations of Cara's version of the song were recorded for the end credits of the film as released in certain markets around the world.

Vajèn van den Bosch (Dutch), Laura Tesoro (Flemish) and Cerise Calixte (French) sang the song both for the end credits and the movie. Yulianna Karaulova (Russian) took also part in the movie voicing Sina, Moana's mother, in the Russian version.

"How Far I'll Go" end credits version worldwide
Language	Performer	Title	Translation
Dutch	Vajèn van den Bosch	"Ooit zal ik gaan"	"Sometime I'll go"
English	Alessia Cara	"How Far I'll Go"	
Flemish	Laura Tesoro	"Ooit zal ik gaan"	"Sometime I'll go"
French	Cerise Calixte	"Le bleu lumière"	"The gleam-blue"
German	Helene Fischer	"Ich bin bereit"	"I am ready"
Japanese	加藤ミリヤ (Miliyah Kato)	"どこまでも" ("Doko made mo")	"To the ends of the earth"
Kazakh	Гулсим Мырзабекова (Gulsim Myrzabekova)	"Бірақ қайда барам" ("Biraq qayda daram")	"Where do I go"
Mandarin Chinese (China)	吉克隽逸 ("Jike Junyì"; Summer Jike)	"海洋之心" ("Hǎiyáng zhī xīn")	"The heart of the sea"
Mandarin Chinese (Taiwan)	阿玲 ("Ā Líng"; A-Lin)	"海洋之心" ("Hǎiyáng zhī xīn")	"The heart of the sea"
Māori	Maisey Rika	"Tukuna Au"	"I was released"
Polish	Natalia Nykiel	"Pół kroku stąd"	"Half a step away"
Russian	Юлианна Караулова (Yulianna Karaulova)	"Ceрдцe мoё" ("Syerdtse moyo")	"My heart"

== Cover versions ==
- In 2017, post-hardcore band Boy Hero covered the song. As of February 2022, the song has amassed over 2 million streams on Spotify.
- In 2019, the Swedish pop group Dolly Style covered the song for a Swedish version of We Love Disney.
