= Know-It-All (album) =

Studio album by Alessia Cara
- Released: November 13, 2015
- Recorded: 2014–2015
- Genres: R&B; pop
- Length: 35:34
- Labels: Def Jam; UMG
- Producers: Alessia Caracciolo; Kuya; Malay; Alan Nglish; Fredro; Pop & Oak; Sebastian Kole

Alessia Cara chronology
Four Pink Walls (2015)	Know-It-All (2015)	The Pains of Growing (2018)

Singles from Know-It-All
- 1. "Here" Released: April 30, 2015; 2. "Wild Things" Released: February 2, 2016; 3. "Scars to Your Beautiful" Released: July 26, 2016

Know-It-All is the debut studio album by the Canadian singer-songwriter Alessia Cara. It was released on November 13, 2015, through Def Jam Recordings. The album followed the release of her debut extended play (EP), Four Pink Walls (2015), which Cara regarded as a preview of the album. Know-It-All contains the five original songs from Four Pink Walls as well as five new songs recorded for the album. The album, a R&B and pop record, was produced by Cara herself, alongside Kuya, Malay, Alan Nglish, Fredro, Pop & Oak, and Sebastian Kole. Kole makes a sole guest appearance on the standard edition of the album.

Three singles were released for the album. The first, "Here", was released on April 30, 2015, and was commercially successful, charting at number 5 on the Billboard Hot 100 and peaking at the top of three more Billboard charts in the United States. The second single, "Wild Things", was released on February 2, 2016, and was modestly successful, peaking within the top 10 of the Canadian CHR/Top 40 and Hot AC charts. The third single, "Scars to Your Beautiful" was the album's final single, released on July 26, 2016. The single was also commercially successful, peaking at number 8 on the Billboard Hot 100 and topping four Billboard charts.

Upon its release, Know-It-All was positively received by music critics, who praised the album for its lyrics and production. Commercially, the album charted at number 9 on the Billboard 200 in the United States and peaked at number 8 on the Billboard Canadian Albums chart. It was also certified 3× Platinum in Canada and 2× Platinum in the United States and New Zealand. The album would eventually win Pop Album of the Year at the 2017 Juno Awards. Reissues of the album feature guest appearances from G-Eazy, Logic, and Jaden Smith, alongside Cara's cover of "How Far I'll Go" from the Disney movie Moana (2016). Cara would go on to promote the album with her Know-It-All Tour throughout 2016.

== Writing and recording ==
Preliminary work on the album began in 2013, with recording taking place in 2014 in New York into 2015. Cara worked with several producers including Kuya, Malay, Alan Nglish, Fredro, Pop & Oak and Sebastian Kole. The latter helped in the conception of the opening track "Seventeen". The song was written when Cara was about eighteen: "It was a whole bunch of feelings. We got to talking in the studio with my dad and Sebastian—we all came up with this thing, like, let's write about how life goes by really fast. My dad brought up that idea, and that's why the first line is, 'My daddy says that life comes at you fast'."

== Singles ==
"Here" was released on April 30, 2015, as the lead single from Cara's extended play (EP) Four Pink Walls. The song became Cara's first top-5 single on the US Billboard Hot 100 chart, upon reaching the peak position of five for the week of January 27, 2016, and Cara performed the song on The Tonight Show with Jimmy Fallon with their house band The Roots. The song received an official video, which was directed by Aaron A.

"Wild Things" was initially released on October 27, 2015, as a promotional single but the song was later sent to US contemporary hit radio on February 2, 2016, as the album's second single, and has since achieved moderate success peaking at number 50 on the Billboard Hot 100.

Cara announced that "Scars to Your Beautiful" would be released as the third single. It was sent to contemporary hit radio on July 26, 2016. It peaked at number 8 on the Billboard Hot 100.

== Critical reception ==
Professional ratings
Aggregate scores
Source	Rating
AnyDecentMusic?	6.7/10
Metacritic	70/100
Review scores
Source	Rating
AllMusic	4/5 stars
Billboard	4/5 stars
Exclaim!	8/10
Idolator	4/5
Newsday	B
NME	4/5 stars
Now	3/5 Ns
Pitchfork	5.5/10
Rolling Stone	3/5 stars
Sputnikmusic	3.7/5

Know-It-All received generally positive reviews from music critics, receiving a 70 out of 100 on the review aggregate website Metacritic based on 13 reviews, indicating "generally favorable reviews". AllMusic reacted positively towards the album, writing "Going by the level of potential shown here, it's evident that Cara will eventually need a lot less creative assistance." Billboard was also positive in its review of the album: "As first impressions go, Know-It-All is a charismatic balance between dreams and reality that makes its author stick out in the most impressive way." Exclaim!'s, Ryan B. Patrick wrote that "while [Know-It-All] is a tad formulaic, it's terrifically executed and solidly produced...Cara's debut is a striking standout pop record that portends career longevity." Pitchfork Media was more mixed: "Writing from the heart does not automatically imbue lyrics with depth. Never is it more apparent that the factory approach is not allowing Cara to fulfill her potential than on 'Scars to Your Beautiful.'"

== Commercial performance ==
Know-It-All debuted at number nine on the US Billboard 200 with first week sales of 36,000 album-equivalent units, of which 22,000 were pure album sales. On November 13, 2025, the album was certified 2× platinum by the Recording Industry Association of America (RIAA) for sales of over two million album-equivalent units in the United States.

== Tour ==
To promote the album, Cara embarked on her first headlining concert tour, the Know-It-All Tour. Tickets went on sale and quickly sold out. The first leg ran from January 15 to April 1, 2016, while a second leg was scheduled from September 29 to November 2, 2016.

Tour dates
Date	City	Country	Venue
North America (Leg 1)
January 15, 2016	Montreal	Canada	Corona Theatre
January 16, 2016	Toronto	Canada	Danforth Music Hall
January 22, 2016	Boston	United States	Brighton Music Hall
January 24, 2016	Washington, DC	United States	9:30 Club
January 25, 2016	Philadelphia	United States	Theatre of Living Arts
January 26, 2016	New York City	United States	Webster Hall
January 28, 2016	Cleveland	United States	Rock & Roll Hall of Fame
January 29, 2016	Chicago	United States	Metro
January 30, 2016	Detroit	United States	St. Andrew's Hall
February 1, 2016	Atlanta	United States	Terminal West
February 2, 2016	Nashville	United States	Mercy Lounge
February 4, 2016	Dallas	United States	Granada Theater
February 5, 2016	Houston	United States	The Studio at Warehouse Live
February 6, 2016	Austin	United States	Emo's
February 9, 2016	Phoenix	United States	Crescent Ballroom
February 11, 2016	San Francisco	United States	The Fillmore
February 12, 2016	Los Angeles	United States	El Rey Theatre
March 29, 2016	Vancouver	Canada	Vogue Theatre
March 31, 2016	Calgary	Canada	Macewan Ballroom
April 1, 2016	Edmonton	Canada	Union Hall
North America (Leg 2)
September 29, 2016	Silver Spring, MD	United States	The Fillmore
September 30, 2016	Philadelphia	United States	The Fillmore
October 1, 2016	Boston	United States	Orpheum Theatre
October 4, 2016	New York City	United States	Radio City Music Hall
October 6, 2016	Detroit	United States	The Fillmore
October 7, 2016	Chicago	United States	Chicago Theatre
October 8, 2016	Minneapolis	United States	Orpheum Theatre
October 10, 2016	Denver	United States	Paramount Theatre
October 11, 2016	Salt Lake City	United States	The Depot
October 13, 2016	Los Angeles	United States	The Wiltern
October 15, 2016	Las Vegas	United States	The Foundry SLS
October 17, 2016	San Francisco	United States	The Masonic
October 18, 2016	San Diego	United States	Copley Symphony Hall
October 19, 2016	Phoenix	United States	Comerica Theatre
October 21, 2016	Grand Prairie, TX	United States	Verizon Theatre
October 22, 2016	Houston	United States	White Oak Music Hall
October 24, 2016	Nashville	United States	Ryman Auditorium
October 25, 2016	Atlanta	United States	The Tabernacle
October 27, 2016	Clearwater, FL	United States	Ruth Eckerd Hall
October 28, 2016	Miami	United States	The Fillmore Miami Beach at Jackie Gleason Theater
October 29, 2016	Orlando	United States	Hard Rock Live
November 1, 2016	Montreal	Canada	Metropolis
November 2, 2016	Toronto	Canada	Massey Hall

== Track listing ==
Standard edition
No.	Title	Writer(s)	Producer(s)	Length
1.	"Seventeen"	Alessia Caracciolo; Andrew "Pop" Wansel; Warren "Oak" Felder; Coleridge Tillman; Samuel Gerongco; Robert Gerongco; William Robinson, Jr.; Ronald White	Pop & Oak; Kuya^{[a]}	3:32
2.	"Here"	Caracciolo; Wansel; Felder; Tillman; S. Gerongco; R. Gerongco; Terence Lam; Isaac Hayes	Pop & Oak; Sebastian Kole	3:19
3.	"Outlaws"	Caracciolo; Wansel; Felder; Tillman; S. Gerongco; R. Gerongco	Pop & Oak; Sebastian Kole	3:23
4.	"I'm Yours"	Caracciolo; Wansel; Felder; Tillman	Pop & Oak; Sebastian Kole	3:48
5.	"Four Pink Walls"	Caracciolo	Alan Nglish	3:31
6.	"Wild Things"	Caracciolo; James Ho; Tillman; Thabiso "Tab" Nkhereanye	Malay; Sebastian Kole	3:08
7.	"Stone" (featuring Sebastian Kole)	Caracciolo; Ho; Tillman	Malay; Sebastian Kole	3:47
8.	"Overdose"	Caracciolo; Wansel; Felder; Tillman; S. Gerongco; R. Gerongco	Pop & Oak; Sebastian Kole	3:28
9.	"Stars"	Caracciolo; Tillman; S. Gerongco; R. Gerongco; Lam	Sebastian Kole; Kuya^{[a]}	3:40
10.	"Scars to Your Beautiful"	Caracciolo; Wansel; Felder; Tillman; Justin Franks	Pop & Oak; Sebastian Kole	3:50
Total length:				35:34

Target exclusive CD and digital deluxe edition bonus tracks
No.	Title	Writer(s)	Producer(s)	Length
11.	"Here" (2:00 AM Version)	Caracciolo; Wansel; Felder; Tillman; S. Gerongco; R. Gerongco; Lam; Hayes	Caracciolo; Sebastian Kole	3:45
12.	"River of Tears"	Caracciolo; Tillman	Sebastian Kole	4:14
13.	"My Song"	Caracciolo; Tillman; Fredrik "Fredro" Ödesjö; Per Eklund; Björn Hallberg	Fredro; Sebastian Kole	4:02
Total length:				47:38

International deluxe edition bonus tracks
No.	Title	Writer(s)	Length
14.	"I'm Yours" (Demo)	Caracciolo; Wansel; Felder; Tillman	3:56
15.	"Wild Things" (Acoustic Version)	Caracciolo; Ho; Tillman; Nkhereanye	3:11
Total length:			54:45

Japanese edition bonus tracks
No.	Title	Writer(s)	Producer(s)	Length
16.	"Wild Things" (featuring G-Eazy)	Caracciolo; Ho; Tillman; Nkhereanye	Malay; Sebastian Kole	3:44
17.	"Here" (Logic Remix)	Caracciolo; Wansel; Felder; Tillman; S. Gerongco; R. Gerongco; Lam; Hayes	Pop & Oak; Kole	3:20
18.	"Here" (Jaden Smith Remix)	Caracciolo; Wansel; Felder; Tillman; S. Gerongco; R. Gerongco; Lam; Hayes	Pop & Oak; Sebastian Kole	3:44
19.	"Scars to Your Beautiful" (NOTD Remix)	Caracciolo; Wansel; Felder; Tillman	Pop & Oak; Sebastian Kole	3:19
20.	"How Far I'll Go"	Lin-Manuel Miranda	Oak Felder; Trevorious	2:56

Notes

- ^{^[a]} signifies a co-producer
- "Seventeen" contains an interpolation of "My Girl" by The Temptations, written by William Robinson Jr. and Ronald White.
- "Here" contains a sample from "Ike's Rap II", written and performed by Isaac Hayes.

== Charts ==
=== Weekly charts ===
Chart (2015–17)	Peak position
Australian Albums (ARIA)	16
Belgian Albums (Ultratop Flanders)	80
Belgian Albums (Ultratop Wallonia)	86
Canadian Albums (Billboard)	8
Danish Albums (Hitlisten)	19
Dutch Albums (Album Top 100)	34
French Albums (SNEP)	120
German Albums (Offizielle Top 100)	99
Irish Albums (IRMA)	52
New Zealand Albums (RMNZ)	26
Norwegian Albums (VG-lista)	15
Scottish Albums (Official Charts)	27
Swedish Albums (Sverigetopplistan)	21
Swiss Albums (Schweizer Hitparade)	50
UK Albums (Official Charts)	14
US Billboard 200	9

=== Year-end charts ===
Chart (2016)	Position
Canadian Albums (Billboard)	22
Danish Albums (Hitlisten)	61
Swedish Albums (Sverigetopplistan)	61
US Billboard 200	42
Chart (2017)	Position
Danish Albums (Hitlisten)	72
Swedish Albums (Sverigetopplistan)	80
US Billboard 200	112

== Certifications ==
Region	Certification	Certified units/sales
Australia (ARIA)	Gold	35,000^{‡}
Canada (Music Canada)	3× Platinum	240,000^{‡}
Denmark (IFPI Danmark)	Platinum	20,000^{‡}
New Zealand (RMNZ)	2× Platinum	30,000^{‡}
Norway (IFPI Norway)	Platinum	20,000^{‡}
Poland (ZPAV)	Gold	10,000^{‡}
Singapore (RIAS)	Gold	5,000^{*}
United Kingdom (BPI)	Gold	100,000^{‡}
United States (RIAA)	2× Platinum	2,000,000^{‡}
^{*} Sales figures based on certification alone.^{‡} Sales+streaming figures based on certification alone.

== Release history ==
List of release dates, showing region, formats, label, editions and reference
Region	Date	Format(s)	Label	Edition(s)	Ref.
Canada	November 13, 2015	CD; digital download; vinyl	Universal Music	Standard; deluxe	
United States	November 13, 2015	CD; digital download; vinyl	Def Jam	Standard; deluxe	
United Kingdom	March 11, 2016	CD; digital download; vinyl	Virgin EMI	Deluxe	
Australia	March 11, 2016	CD; digital download; vinyl	Universal Music Australia	Deluxe	
