= Axis Records =

Axis Records may refer to:

- A record label operated by Jeff Mills, which releases most of his work
- Former name of 4AD, a record label started in 1979 as Axis Records by Ivo Watts-Russell and Peter Kent
- A budget record label derived from EMI
