= Here (Alessia Cara song) =

2015 debut single by Alessia Cara

Single by Alessia Cara

from the EP Four Pink Walls and the album Know-It-All
- Released: April 30, 2015
- Recorded: 2014
- Genre: Pop; R&B; soul; trip hop
- Length: 3:19
- Label: Def Jam
- Songwriters: Alessia Caracciolo; Andrew "Pop" Wansel; Warren "Oak" Felder; Coleridge Tillman; Isaac Hayes; Samuel Gerongco; Robert Gerongco; Terence Lam
- Producers: Pop & Oak; Sebastian Kole; RP

Alessia Cara singles chronology
"Here" (2015)	"Wild Things" (2016)

Music video
- "Here" on YouTube

"Here" is the debut single by the Canadian singer-songwriter Alessia Cara, released on April 30, 2015, as the lead single from her debut extended play (EP), Four Pink Walls (2015) and her first full-length album, Know-It-All (2015), through Def Jam Recordings. The song was recorded in 2014 and written by Cara with Kuya Productions, Terence Lam, Pop & Oak and Sebastian Kole, who also co-produced the song. The song was created around a sample of "Ike's Rap II" by Isaac Hayes from his album Black Moses (1971). "Here" is a pop and R&B record with soul elements, and is about people who secretly hate parties.

The song was a sleeper hit, debuting at number 95 on the US Billboard Hot 100 for the week of August 22, 2015, becoming Cara's first entry on the chart. It later became her first top five single on the chart and reached the top of the US Pop Songs chart after a historic 26-week climb which broke a record held by Cee Lo Green's "F**k You!" and Demi Lovato's "Give Your Heart a Break". The song also peaked at number 19 in Cara's home country of Canada, and has charted in the top three in Iceland and the 40 in Australia, the Netherlands, New Zealand, and the United Kingdom. It was certified 5× Platinum in the US.

The song's music video, directed by Aaron A, depicts Cara at a house party, and was released on May 26, 2015. An official remix EP of the song was released, featuring American rappers Logic, Jaden Smith, Chris Lorenzo, and Imanos & Gramercy, and the song was performed by Cara collaborating with the Roots and Taylor Swift. The song was nominated for numerous awards, including a Juno Award and six nominations at the 2016 IHeartRadio MMVAs.

== Background and composition ==
While working on her debut album in 2014, Cara attended a house party. She told NME, "Everyone seemed to know each other, but not me. It was sweaty, there was a guy and girl passed out with vomit all over her, people were just stepping over them." The party caused her so much discomfort that she called her mother asking to take her home. Cara discussed the party with co-writer Sebastian Kole who then came up with the first line of the song. Her record label, Def Jam, initially persuaded her to release another song that was more friendly for radio, but Cara pushed for the release of "Here" as she felt the other song would not have made her stand out from other singers.

"Here" is a pop, R&B, soul, and trip hop song. It revolves around a sample of "Ike's Rap II" by Isaac Hayes from his fifth studio album Black Moses (1971), which had previously been sampled in Portishead's "Glory Box" and Massive Attack member Tricky's "Hell Is Round the Corner". Producers Oak Felder and Pop Wansel argued about wanting a Portishead or Hayes sample for the song, both unaware it was the same one. Due to the sample's inclusion, Hayes is credited as a writer. Cara wrote the song herself, alongside Pop & Oak, Sebastian Kole, Kuya Productions, and Terence Lam. Pop & Oak, Kole, and RP would produce the track.

== Critical reception ==
2016 VOA newscast on "Here"
A February 2016 Voice of America news segment on Cara and "Here"

"Here" was met with critical acclaim by music critics, who praised the song's concept and lyrics. Rolling Stone ranked "Here" at number 21 on its year-end list of the 50 best songs of 2015. Billboard ranked "Here" at number six on its year-end list: "If Lorde's 'Royals' was a rallying cry for those who felt isolated by the rampant materialism in pop culture, then Alessia Cara's 'Here' is the anthem for those fed up with the glut of pop songs about partying and drinking. Thanks to the teenage R&B singer, being an introvert is finally cool again." The prestigious Village Voice voted "Here" the 18th-best single released in 2015 on their annual year-end critics' poll, Pazz & Jop; the song is tied with Courtney Barnett's "Depreston".

=== Accolades ===
Publication	Accolade	Rank
Billboard	25 Best Songs of 2015	6
Complex	The Best Songs of 2015	10
Consequence of Sound	Top 50 Songs of 2015	42
Entertainment Weekly	The 40 Best Songs of 2015	4
Pazz & Jop	Single of the Year 2015	18
Pitchfork	The 100 Best Tracks of 2015	32
PopMatters	The 90 Best Songs of 2015	64
Rolling Stone	50 Best Songs of 2015	21
Time Out London	The 100 Best Songs of 2015	10

== Commercial performance ==
=== Canada ===
Upon its release, the single charted at number 19 on the Canadian Hot 100, alongside charting at number 46 on the Canada Rock chart, 35 on the Canada AC chart, and number 30 on the Hot AC chart, and peaked at number 6 on the CHR/Top 40 chart. It was also certified 5× Platinum by Music Canada (MC) for equivalent sales of 400,000 units in the country. By the end of 2015, the single was positioned at number 60 on the Canadian Hot 100, and by the end of 2016, the single was positioned at number 79 on the chart.

=== United States of America ===
In the United States of America, the single debuted at number 95 on the Billboard Hot 100, before peaking at number 5 on the chart. It also charted at number 30 on the Latin Airplay chart, number 16 on the Adult Top 40 chart, and number 3 on the Dance/Mix Show Airplay chart, alongside topping the Pop Airplay chart, the Hot R&B/Hip-Hop Songs chart, and the Rhythmic Airplay chart. It was also certified 5× Platinum by the Recording Industry Association of America (RIAA) for equivalent sales of 5,000,000 units. By the end of 2015, the single was positioned at number 94 on the Billboard Hot 100, and by the end of 2016, the single was positioned at number 39 on the chart, alongside positioning at number 43 on the Adult Top 40 chart, number 27 on the Dance/Mix Show Airplay chart, number 25 on the Mainstream Top 40 chart, number 22 on the Rhythmic Airplay chart, and number 9 on the Hot R&B/Hip-Hop Songs chart.

=== Europe ===
In Austria, the single charted at number 63 on the Ö3 Austria Top 40 chart. In Belgium, the single charted at number 34 on the Ultratop 50 in Wallonia and peaked at number 4 on the Ultratip Bubbling Under chart in Flanders. In the Czech Republic, the single charted at number 46 on the Rádio – Top 100 chart and peaked at number 21 on the Singles Digitál Top 100 chart. In Denmark, although the single did not chart, it was certified Platinum by IFPI Danmark (IFPI DEN) for equivalent sales of 90,000 units in the country. In France, the single charted at number 21 on the SNEP chart and peaked at number 15 on SNEP's France Airplay chart. It was also certified Gold by SNEP for equivalent sales of 100,000 units in the country. In Germany, the single charted at number 59 on the GfK Entertainment charts and was certified Gold by Bundesverband Musikindustrie (BVMI) for equivalent sales of 200,000 units in the country.

In Iceland, the single charted at number 3 on the Ríkisútvarpið chart. In Ireland, the single charted at number 71 on the Irish Singles Chart. In Italy, although the single did not chart, it was certified Gold by the Federazione Industria Musicale Italiana (FIMI) for equivalent sales of 25,000 units in the country. In the Netherlands, the single charted at number 28 on the Dutch Top 40 and peaked at number 26 on the Dutch Single Top 100. In Norway, although the single did not chart, it was certified Gold by IFPI Norge (IFPI NOR) for equivalent sales of 30,000 units in the country. In Poland, although the single did not chart, it was certified Gold by the Polish Society of the Phonographic Industry (ZPAV) for equivalent sales of 25,000 units in the country. In Portugal, although the single did not chart, it was certified Gold by Associação Fonográfica Portuguesa (AFP) for equivalent sales of 10,000 units in the country.

In Slovakia, the single charted at number 66 on the Rádio – Top 100 chart and peaked at number 24 on the Singles Digitál Top 100 chart. In Spain, although the single did not chart, it was certified Gold by Productores de Música de España (PROMUSICAE) for equivalent sales of 30,000 units in the country. In Sweden, the single charted at number 62 on the Sverigetopplistan chart, and was certified Platinum by Grammofon Leverantörernas Förening (GLF) for equivalent sales of 40,000 units in the country. In Switzerland, the single charted at number 44 on the Schweizer Hitparade chart. In the United Kingdom, the single charted at number 28 on the UK singles chart and was certified Platinum by the British Phonographic Industry (BPI) for equivalent sales of 600,000 units in the country.

=== Other countries ===
In Australia, the single charted at number 12 on the ARIA Charts, and was certified 2× Platinum by the Australian Recording Industry Association (ARIA) for equivalent sales of 140,000 units in the country. In Brazil, although the single did not chart, it was certified 2× Platinum by Pro-Música Brasil (PMB) for equivalent sales of 120,000 units in the country. In Mexico, the single charted at number 20 on the Monitor Latino chart. In New Zealand, the single charted at number 15 on the Official Aotearoa Music Charts, and was certified 3× Platinum by Recorded Music New Zealand (RMNZ) for equivalent sales of 90,000 units in the country.

== Music video ==
An official lyric video of the song was released on her YouTube page on May 7, 2015. The official video was directed by Aaron A and was released on her YouTube page on May 26, 2015. The video uses the inspiration of how Cara wrote the song by having her at a party and being the only one moving while the party is frozen in time, while she's next to crowds of girls and guys drinking beer and gossiping. In an interview with Taylor Swift, Cara states the extras at the party are actually people from the original party that was the inspiration for the song, and some of her friends.

As of September 23, 2025, the music video is Cara's most-viewed music video as a lead artist and the most-viewed video on her channel, garnering 280,000,000 views and 3,100,000 likes. At the 2016 IHeartRadio MMVAs, it was nominated three MuchMusic Video Awards, including Best Video, Best Pop Video, and Fan Fave Video, although it lost all three awards to Drake's "Hotline Bling" and the Camila Cabello–Shawn Mendes collabortation "I Know What You Did Last Summer" respectively. It was also nominated Best R&B Video at the 2016 MTV Video Music Awards in Japan, but lost to Daichi Miura's "Cry & Fight". The visual effect of the frozen partygoers predated the Mannequin Challenge, a viral Internet phenomenon further pioneered by Rae Sremmurd, specifically with their 2016 single "Black Beatles".

== Live performances ==
On July 29, 2015, Cara made her US television debut on The Tonight Show Starring Jimmy Fallon performing "Here" with house band The Roots, after host Jimmy Fallon discovered the song online. On October 31, 2015, Cara joined Taylor Swift onstage as a surprise guest at the 1989 World Tour in Tampa, Florida, singing a duet of "Here" for Swift's last US show. On November 20, 2015, Cara sang "Here" live during the closing credits of the NBC live comedy, Undateable.

== Track listings ==
Digital download
No.	Title	Writer(s)	Producer(s)	Length
1.	"Here"	Alessia Caracciolo; Andrew "Pop" Wansel; Warren "Oak" Felder; Coleridge Tillman; Isaac Hayes; Samuel Gerongco; Robert Gerongco; Terence Lam	Pop & Oak; Sebastian Kole; RP	3:19
Total length:				3:19

CD single
No.	Title	Writer(s)	Producer(s)	Length
1.	"Here"	Caracciolo; Wansel; Felder; Tillman; Hayes; S.Gerongco; R. Gerongco; Lam	Pop & Oak; Sebastian Kole; RP	3:19
2.	"Seventeen"	Caracciolo; Wansel; Felder; Tillman; S.Gerongco; R. Gerongco; William Robinson, Jr.; Ronald White	Pop & Oak; Kuya^{[a]}	3:32
Total length:				6:51

Digital download - The Remixes
No.	Title	Writer(s)	Producer(s)	Length
1.	"Here (Logic Remix) [feat. Logic]"	Caracciolo; Wansel; Felder; Tillman; Hayes; S.Gerongco; R. Gerongco; Lam	Pop & Oak; Sebastian Kole; RP	3:19
2.	"Here (Jaden Smith Remix) [feat. Jaden Smith]"	Caracciolo; Wansel; Felder; Tillman; Hayes; S.Gerongco; R. Gerongco; Lam	Pop & Oak; Sebastian Kole; RP	3:44
3.	"Here (Chris Lorenzo Remix)"	Caracciolo; Wansel; Felder; Tillman; Hayes; S.Gerongco; R. Gerongco; Lam	Pop & Oak; Sebastian Kole; RP	4:54
4.	"Here (Imanos & Gramercy Remix)"	Caracciolo; Wansel; Felder; Tillman; Hayes; S.Gerongco; R. Gerongco; Lam	Pop & Oak; Sebastian Kole; RP	3:27
Total length:				15:24

== 2:00 AM version ==
"Here (2:00 AM version)"

Song by Alessia Cara

from the album Know-It-All (Deluxe editions)
- Released: November 13, 2015
- Recorded: 2015
- Length: 3:45
- Label: Def Jam
- Songwriters: Alessia Caracciolo; Andrew "Pop" Wansel; Warren "Oak" Felder; Coleridge Tillman; Isaac Hayes; Samuel Gerongco; Robert Gerongco; Terence Lam

A "2:00 AM version" of the song was recorded in 2015, and released that same year, on the 13th of November. It would later be included on deluxe editions of Cara's debut studio album, Know-It-All (2015). It was first included on the album's Target-exclusive and digital deluxe editions, before later appearing on the international deluxe edition and the Japanese edition of the album.

== Charts ==
=== Weekly charts ===
Chart (2015–2016)	Peak position
Australia (ARIA)	12
Austria (Ö3 Austria Top 40)	63
Belgium (Ultratip Bubbling Under Flanders)	4
Belgium (Ultratop 50 Wallonia)	34
Canada Hot 100 (Billboard)	19
Canada AC (Billboard)	35
Canada CHR/Top 40 (Billboard)	6
Canada Hot AC (Billboard)	30
Canada Rock (Billboard)	46
Czech Republic Airplay (ČNS IFPI)	46
Czech Republic Singles Digital (ČNS IFPI)	21
France (SNEP)	21
France Airplay (SNEP)	15
Germany (GfK)	59
Hungary (Stream Top 40)	27
Iceland (RÚV)	3
Ireland (IRMA)	71
Mexico Anglo (Monitor Latino)	20
Netherlands (Single Top 100)	26
Netherlands (Dutch Top 40)	28
New Zealand (Recorded Music NZ)	15
Slovakia Airplay (ČNS IFPI)	66
Slovakia Singles Digital (ČNS IFPI)	24
Sweden (Sverigetopplistan)	62
Switzerland (Schweizer Hitparade)	44
UK Singles (Official Charts)	28
US Billboard Hot 100	5
US Adult Pop Airplay (Billboard)	16
US Dance Airplay (Billboard)	3
US Latin Airplay (Billboard)	30
US Pop Airplay (Billboard)	1
US Hot R&B/Hip-Hop Songs (Billboard)	1
US Rhythmic Airplay (Billboard)	1

=== Year-end charts ===
Chart (2015)	Position
Canada (Canadian Hot 100)	60
US Billboard Hot 100	94

Chart (2016)	Position
Canada (Canadian Hot 100)	79
US Billboard Hot 100	39
US Adult Top 40 (Billboard)	43
US Dance/Mix Show Airplay (Billboard)	27
US Hot R&B/Hip-Hop Songs (Billboard)	9
US Mainstream Top 40 (Billboard)	25
US Rhythmic (Billboard)	22

== Certifications ==
Region	Certification	Certified units/sales
Australia (ARIA)	2× Platinum	140,000^{‡}
Brazil (Pro-Música Brasil)	2× Platinum	120,000^{‡}
Canada (Music Canada)	5× Platinum	400,000^{‡}
Denmark (IFPI Danmark)	Platinum	90,000^{‡}
France (SNEP)	Gold	100,000^{‡}
Germany (BVMI)	Gold	200,000^{‡}
Italy (FIMI)	Gold	25,000^{‡}
New Zealand (RMNZ)	3× Platinum	90,000^{‡}
Norway (IFPI Norway)	Gold	30,000^{‡}
Poland (ZPAV)	Gold	25,000^{‡}
Portugal (AFP)	Gold	10,000^{‡}
Spain (Promusicae)	Gold	30,000^{‡}
Sweden (GLF)	Platinum	40,000^{‡}
United Kingdom (BPI)	Platinum	600,000^{‡}
United States (RIAA)	5× Platinum	5,000,000^{‡}
^{‡} Sales+streaming figures based on certification alone.

== Release history ==
List of release dates, showing region, format(s), label(s) and reference(s)
Region	Date	Format	Version	Label	Ref.
United States	April 30, 2015	Digital download	Original	Def Jam	
Canada	April 30, 2015	Digital download	Original	Def Jam	
United States	June 15, 2015	Adult album alternative	Original	Def Jam	
United States	July 14, 2015	Top 40 radio	Original	Def Jam	
United Kingdom	August 17, 2015	Top 40 radio	Original	UMG	
Italy	October 9, 2015	Radio airplay	Original	UMG	
United States	October 15, 2015	CD single	Original	Def Jam	
United States	November 9, 2015	Hot adult contemporary	Original	Def Jam	
United States	November 13, 2015	Digital download	2:00 AM version	Def Jam	
Various	April 15, 2016	Digital download; streaming	Remixes EP	Def Jam; UMG	
