= Wild Things (song) =

Single by Alessia Cara

from the album Know-It-All
- Released: February 2, 2016
- Recorded: December 2014
- Studio: Los Angeles, California
- Genre: Indie pop
- Length: 3:08
- Label: Def Jam
- Songwriters: Alessia Caracciolo; Coleridge Tillman; Thabiso "Tab" Nkhereanye; James Ho
- Producer: Malay

Alessia Cara singles chronology
"Here" (2015)	"Wild Things" (2016)	"Wild" (2016)

Music video
- "Wild Things" on YouTube

"Wild Things" is a song recorded by Canadian singer-songwriter Alessia Cara for her debut studio album, Know-It-All (2015). It was released to digital retailers on October 27, 2015, through Def Jam Recordings, as a promotional single before being sent to contemporary hit radio on February 2, 2016, as the album's second official single. The song, an indie pop record, was recorded throughout December 2014 in Los Angeles, California, and written by Cara herself, alongside Sebastian Kole, Thabiso "Tab" Nkhereanye, and the song's producer, James Ho, who produced the song under the "Malay" name. Lyrically, the song is about being free and "wild" in the world.

Upon its release, the song received positive reviews from music critics, who praised it for its message and sound. Commercially, "Wild Things" has charted at number fifty on the US Billboard Hot 100 and has also attained top-forty peaks in multiple territories including Australia, Canada, and New Zealand. In Cara's native Canada, the song peaked at number 14, five positions higher than her highly successful debut, "Here". The song has also been certified 5× Platinum by Music Canada (MC), 2× Platinum by the Australian Recording Industry Association (ARIA), the Recording Industry Association of America (RIAA), and 3× Platinum by Recorded Music New Zealand (RMNZ).

The song's music video, directed by Aaron A, was released on the 7th of March, 2016, and depicts Cara and her friends hanging out together, and was nominated for Best Pop Video at the 2016 MTV Video Music Awards. An extended play (EP) of remixes was released for the song, featuring two guest appearances from G-Eazy. The song itself was nominated for Song of the Year at the 2017 Canadian Radio Music Awards and Single of the Year at the 2017 Juno Awards. At the Juno Awards of 2016, the song was performed alongside its predecessor, "Here". The performance was nominated in the Performance in a Variety or Sketch Comedy Program or Series category at the Canadian Screen Awards.

== Background and production ==
"Wild Things" was recorded in Los Angeles in December 2014; the inspiration for the song came about after a conversation between Cara and her A&R Thabiso Nkhereanye, regarding some hats that bore a message that Cara disapproved of. The song was written by Cara and Nkhereanye themselves, alongside Sebastian Kole, who had previously produced her debut single, "Here", and Malay, who also helped in producing the track.

== Critical reception ==
2016 VOA news segment on "Wild Things"
A March 2016 Voice of America news segment on Cara and "Wild Things"

Mike Wass of Idolator called it "Another fiery celebration of outsiders." Rolling Stone's Brittany Spanos labeled it "anthemic" and a "celebration of youth", saying "[Wild Things] follows in the vein of the anti-cool kid stance on 'Here.' Unlike her debut single, however, Cara goes for more straight-up pop on the more fast-paced, percussive tune." Jessie Morris of Complex stated that the song is "another infectious and insightful coming-of-age track."

== Commercial performance ==
=== Canada ===
Upon its release, the single charted at number 14 on the Canadian Hot 100, alongside charting at number 12 on the Canada AC and peaking at number 5 on both the CHR/Top 40 and Hot AC charts. It was also certified 5× Platinum by Music Canada (MC) for equivalent sales of 400,000 units in the country. By the end of 2016, the single was positioned at number 27 on the Canadian Hot 100.

=== United States of America ===
In the United States of America, the single charted at number 50 on the Billboard Hot 100. It also charted at number 34 on both the Adult Pop Airplay and Rhythmic Airplay charts, number 20 on the Dance/Mix Show Airplay chart, and number 14 on the Pop Airplay chart, and peaked at number 13 on the Dance Club Songs chart. It was also certified 2× Platinum by the Recording Industry Association of America (RIAA) for equivalent sales of 2,000,000 units in the country. By the end of 2016, the single was positioned at number 50 on the Mainstream Top 40 chart.

=== Europe ===
In the Czech Republic, the single charted at number 26 on their Singles Digitál Top 100 chart. In Denmark, although the single did not chart, it was certified Gold by IFPI Danmark (IFPI DEN) for equivalent sales of 45,000 units in the country. In Germany, the single charted at number 76 on the GfK Entertainment charts. In Iceland, the single charted at number 13 on the Ríkisútvarpið chart. In Ireland, the single charted at number 66 on the Irish Singles Chart. In Italy, the single charted at number 67 on the Italian Singles Chart and was certified Gold by Federazione Industria Musicale Italiana (FIMI) for equivalent sales of 25,000 units in the country. In the Netherlands, the single charted at number 58 on the Dutch Single Top 100. In Norway, although the single did not chart, it was certified Gold by IFPI Norge (IFPI NOR) for equivalent sales of 30,000 units in the country.

In Portugal, the single charted at number 44 on the Portuguese Singles Chart. In Slovakia, the single charted at number 25 on their Singles Digital Top 100. In Sweden, the single charted at number 61 on the Sverigetopplistan chart and was certified Platinum by Grammofonleverantörernas förening (GLF) for equivalent sales of 40,000 units in the country. In Switzerland, the single charted at number 51 on the Schweizer Hitparade. In the United Kingdom, the single charted at number 63 on the UK singles chart and was certified Gold by the British Phonographic Industry (BPI) for equivalent sales of 400,000 units in the country.

=== Other countries ===
In Australia, the single charted at number 25 on the ARIA Charts and was certified 2× Platinum by the Australian Recording Industry Association (ARIA) for equivalent sales of 140,000 units in the country. By the end of 2016, the single was positioned at number 98 on the ARIA Charts. In Brazil, although the single did not chart, it was certified Platinum by Pro-Música Brasil (PMB) for equivalent sales of 60,000 units in the country. In New Zealand, the single charted at number 12 on the Official Aotearoa Music Charts and was certified 3× Platinum by Recorded Music New Zealand (RMNZ) for equivalent sales of 60,000 units in the country. By the end of 2016, the single was positioned at number 41 on the Official Aotearoa Music Charts.

== Music video ==
An accompanying music video for "Wild Things" was directed by Aaron A and premiered on March 7, 2016. Opening with a monologue in which Cara describes what "wild" means to her in the song, the video features Cara and her friends exploring Brampton and the suburbs of Toronto, engaging in carefree activities such as drawing fake tattoos on one another and setting off fireworks at Cherry Beach. "To me," Cara says during the video's introductory sequence, "Where The Wild Things Are is a place that exists in our minds. It's a place of liberty and shamelessness. It can take a split second or a lifetime to find it, but once you do, you'll be free." The video was nominated for Best Pop Video at the 2016 MTV Video Music Awards.

== Track listings ==
Digital download
No.	Title	Length
1.	"Wild Things"	3:08

Digital download – NuKid Remix
No.	Title	Length
1.	"Wild Things" (NuKid Remix)	5:15

Digital download – Remixes EP
No.	Title	Length
1.	"Wild Things" (featuring G-Eazy) (Remix)	3:44
2.	"Wild Things" (featuring G-Eazy) (Young Bombs Remix)	4:02
3.	"Wild Things" (MK Remix)	5:15
4.	"Wild Things" (NuKid Remix)	5:15

Digital download – Fedez remix
No.	Title	Length
1.	"Wild Things" (featuring Fedez)	3:46

== Charts ==
=== Weekly charts ===
Chart (2015–16)	Peak position
Australia (ARIA)	25
Canada Hot 100 (Billboard)	14
Canada AC (Billboard)	12
Canada CHR/Top 40 (Billboard)	5
Canada Hot AC (Billboard)	5
Czech Republic Singles Digital (ČNS IFPI)	26
Germany (GfK)	76
Hungary (Stream Top 40)	32
Iceland (RÚV)	13
Ireland (IRMA)	66
Italy (FIMI)	67
Netherlands (Single Top 100)	58
New Zealand (Recorded Music NZ)	12
Portugal (AFP)	44
Slovakia Singles Digital (ČNS IFPI)	25
Sweden (Sverigetopplistan)	61
Switzerland (Schweizer Hitparade)	51
UK Singles (Official Charts)	63
US Billboard Hot 100	50
US Adult Pop Airplay (Billboard)	34
US Dance Airplay (Billboard)	20
US Dance Club Songs (Billboard)	13
US Pop Airplay (Billboard)	14
US Rhythmic Airplay (Billboard)	34

=== Year-end charts ===
Chart (2016)	Position
Australia (ARIA)	98
Canada (Canadian Hot 100)	27
New Zealand (Recorded Music NZ)	41
US Mainstream Top 40 (Billboard)	50

== Certifications ==
Region	Certification	Certified units/sales
Australia (ARIA)	2× Platinum	140,000^{‡}
Brazil (Pro-Música Brasil)	Platinum	60,000^{‡}
Canada (Music Canada)	5× Platinum	400,000^{‡}
Denmark (IFPI Danmark)	Gold	45,000^{‡}
Italy (FIMI)	Gold	25,000^{‡}
New Zealand (RMNZ)	3× Platinum	90,000^{‡}
Norway (IFPI Norway)	Gold	30,000^{‡}
Sweden (GLF)	Platinum	40,000^{‡}
United Kingdom (BPI)	Gold	400,000^{‡}
United States (RIAA)	2× Platinum	2,000,000^{‡}
^{‡} Sales+streaming figures based on certification alone.

== Radio and release history ==
List of release dates, showing region, format(s), label(s) and reference(s)
Country	Date	Format	Version	Label	Ref.
Various	October 27, 2015 (Note: Release as a promotional single.)	Digital download	Original	Def Jam; UMG	
United States	February 2, 2016	Contemporary hit radio	Original	Def Jam	
Various	April 15, 2016	Digital download	NuKid Remix	Def Jam; UMG	
Various	May 13, 2016	Digital download	Remixes EP	Def Jam; UMG	
United States	July 5, 2016	Hot / Modern / AC radio	Original	Def Jam	
Italy	July 8, 2016	Digital download	Fedez remix	Def Jam; UMG	
