= Kuya =

Kuya Куя
- Village
- Location within Arkhangelsk Oblast Location within Russia
- Coordinates: 65°04′N 40°05′E
- Country: Russia
- Region: Arkhangelsk Oblast
- District: Primorsky District
- Time zone: UTC+3:00 (CET)

Kuya (Russian: Куя) is a rural locality (a village) in Talazhskoye Rural Settlement of Primorsky District, Arkhangelsk Oblast, Russia. The population is 3 as of 2010.

== Geography ==
It is located 50 km north from Arkhangelsk.
