= Sebastian Kole =

American singer-songwriter

Pynk Beard (Sebastian Kole)
- Also known as: Sebastian Kole, Pynk Beard
- Born: Coleridge Gardner Tillman; January 17, 1982 (age 44); Birmingham, Alabama
- Genres: Pop, R&B
- Occupations: Songwriter, producer, singer
- Instruments: Piano, drums, guitar
- Label: Anzie Blue Records

Coleridge Gardner Tillman (born January 17, 1982), who goes by the stage name Pynk Beard (previously Sebastian Kole), is an American singer-songwriter and record producer from Birmingham, Alabama. He is currently signed to Anzie Blue Records. Prior to his work with Motown, Sebastian was known for co-writing on a Jennifer Lopez and Flo Rida single titled "Goin' In". Since signing with EP Entertainment/Motown in 2012, Sebastian worked with label-mate Alessia Cara, co-writing and co-producing her album, including her debut single "Here" (along with Grammy-winning producers Andrew "Pop" Wansel and Oak).

== Early life ==
Pynk Beard, formerly known as Sebastian Kole, was born Coleridge Gardner Tillman, on January 17, 1982, in Birmingham, Alabama. He learned music through church, where he began singing in choral and playing doctor at the age of 5. At age 13 he began to delve into a rap career and writing his own songs, which evolved into a singing career once he started college.

== Career ==
Kole would play at various bars and clubs while attending the University of Alabama where he eventually graduated as a Music Tech major. Upon his graduation, Sebastian moved back home and continued to work on his writing. In early 2012, he co-wrote a Jennifer Lopez and Flo Rida collaboration titled "Goin' In". This placement prompted him to move to LA where he signed with EP Entertainment and Motown in December 2012.

In 2014, Sebastian began working with EP Entertainment labelmate Alessia Cara, who released her debut single on Def Jam in April 2015. Sebastian co-wrote and co-produced her debut album along with Pop & Oak Kuya and Malay. The song debuted on The Fader and accumulated over 500,000 streams in its first week. Kole has also worked on music for the TV series Grey's Anatomy.

His debut album, Soup, was released on October 7, 2016. It was preceded by a self-titled EP in May and three singles released across March and April: "Home", "Love's On the Way" and "Love Doctor".

Pynk Beard performed at the official FIFA House in Manhattan during the 2026 FIFA World Cup weekend. He is performing on the 2026 State Fair of Texas main stage during opening weekend.

== Discography ==
=== Studio albums ===
Title	Album details
Soup	Released: October 7, 2016; Label: Motown; Formats: Digital download

=== Extended plays ===
Title	Details
Sebastian Kole	Released: May 13, 2016; Label: Motown; Formats: Digital download

=== Singles ===
Title	Year	Album
"Home"	2016	Sebastian Kole
"Love is on the Way"	2016	Sebastian Kole
"Love Doctor"	2016	Sebastian Kole

=== Songwriting and production credits ===
Title	Year	Artist(s)	Album	Writing	Producing
"Seventeen"	2015	Alessia Cara	Know-It-All	check	
"Here"	2015	Alessia Cara	Know-It-All	check	check
"Outlaws"	2015	Alessia Cara	Know-It-All	check	check
"I'm Yours"	2015	Alessia Cara	Know-It-All	check	check
"Wild Things"	2015	Alessia Cara	Know-It-All	check	check
"Overdose"	2015	Alessia Cara	Know-It-All	check	check
"Stars"	2015	Alessia Cara	Know-It-All	check	check
"Scars to Your Beautiful"	2015	Alessia Cara	Know-It-All	check	check
"River of Tears"	2015	Alessia Cara	Know-It-All	check	check
"My Song"	2015	Alessia Cara	Know-It-All	check	check
"It's Alright"	2017	Star Cast	Star: Original Soundtrack From Season 1	check	
"Bridges"	2017	Fifth Harmony	Fifth Harmony	check	
"Friends"	2018	E^ST	Life Ain't Always Roses	check	
"Mama"	2018	Ray BLK	Empress	check	
"Blind"	2019	PrettyMuch	Non-album single	check	
"Favorite Bitch"	2019	Terror Jr	Unfortunately, Terror Jr	check	
"The World Is Mine"	2019	Samm Henshaw	Non-album single	check	
"Freedom Rings"	2019	Brandy	Non-album single	check	
"Actions"	2020	John Legend	Bigger Love	check	
"Bad Habits (Intro)"	2020	JoJo	Good to Know (Physical Version)	check	
"Keep Climbing"	2020	Delta Goodrem	Bridge over Troubled Dreams	check	
"Time Machine"	2020	Alicia Keys	Alicia	check	
"Perfect Way to Die"	2020	Alicia Keys	Alicia	check	check
