= List of songs recorded by Alessia Cara =

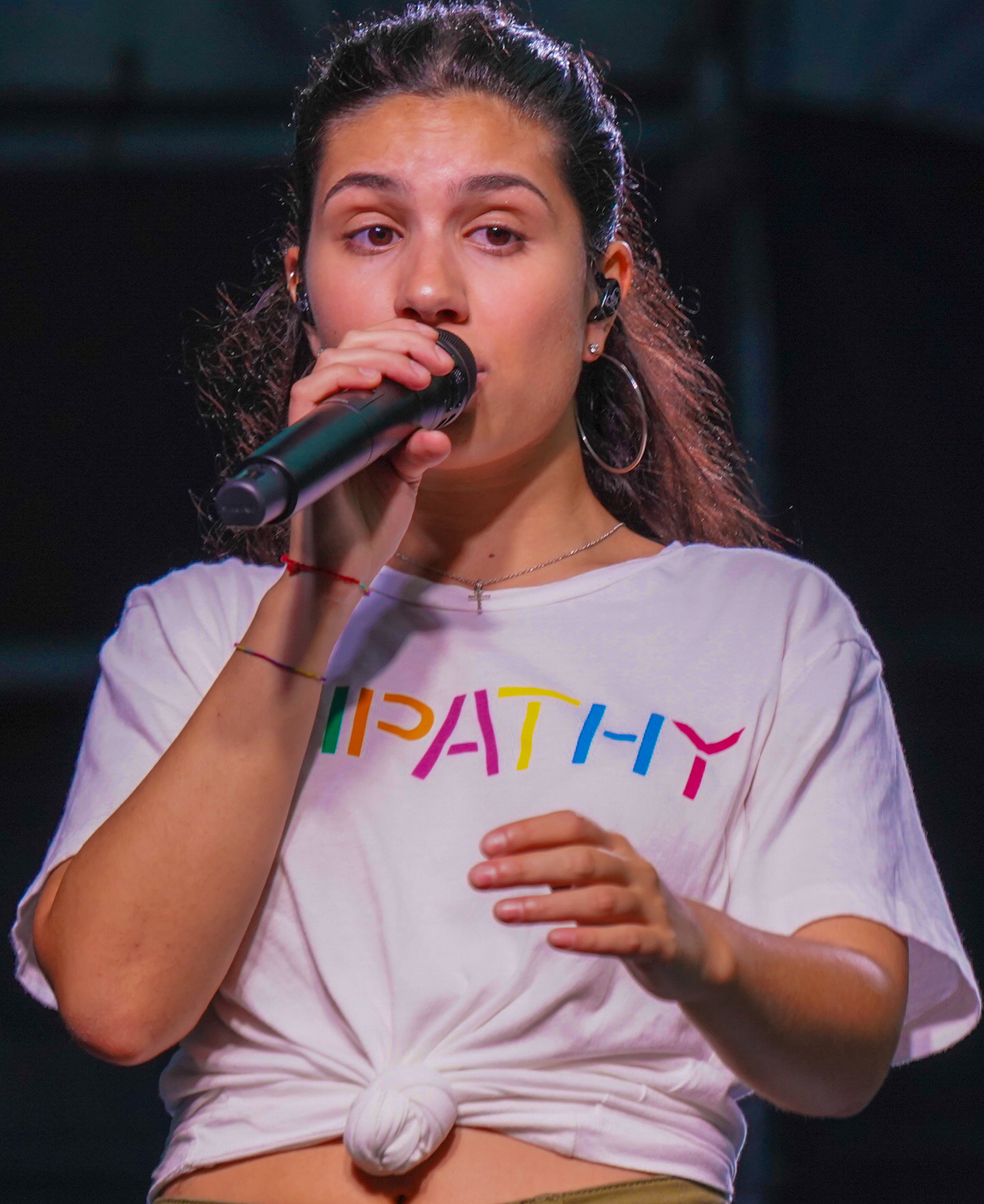
Cara performing at Washington's National Mall in 2018

Canadian singer-songwriter Alessia Cara has recorded songs for three studio albums, three extended plays (EP), one live album, and several guest features. She bought her first guitar at age 10 and taught herself how to play by ear. Three years later, Cara started a YouTube channel where she would post cover versions of popular music. Aged 16, she hired EP Entertainment as her management team and signed with Def Jam Recordings. Cara began writing songs for her debut studio album, Know-It-All (2015), with Sebastian Kole and its producers Pop & Oak. She released the four-track R&B and pop extended play (EP) Four Pink Walls in August 2015, followed by the album three months later. The latter, an "album about youth and teenage life" according to Cara, included 10 songs co-written by her; Billboard's Clover Hope thought it displayed "a strong sense of adolescent idealism and a spoonful of smart cynicism".

Cara co-wrote all 15 songs featured on her second studio album, The Pains of Growing (2018), and was the sole credited songwriter on 5 of them. Inspired by her solitude while conceiving the album, she penned songs about fighting her insecurities over writing music alone. NME's Nick Levine described its sound as "salty pop-R&B, (Amy) Winehouse-esque retro-pop, and stripped-down acoustic tunes". Cara created her second EP, This Summer (2019), with Jon Levine. The Christmas EP Holiday Stuff was released the following year. Her third studio album, In the Meantime (2021), included 18 songs co-written by her; Rolling Stone's Sarah Grant described it as "a mighty pop opera" that guides listeners through the five stages of grief.

Cara has contributed songs to film soundtracks: "How Far I'll Go" (2016) to Moana, "The Other Side" (2017) to The Get Down Part II, and "Feel You Now" and "Last Goodbye" (both 2021) to Blade Runner: Black Lotus. She has been featured as a guest artist on songs by several other artists, including Logic's "1-800-273-8255" and Zedd's "Stay" in 2017. In 2021, Cara was among more than 40 artists who recorded "Himno a La Alegria" as "a voice of harmony and hope" to promote "a kinder and more humane world".

== Songs ==
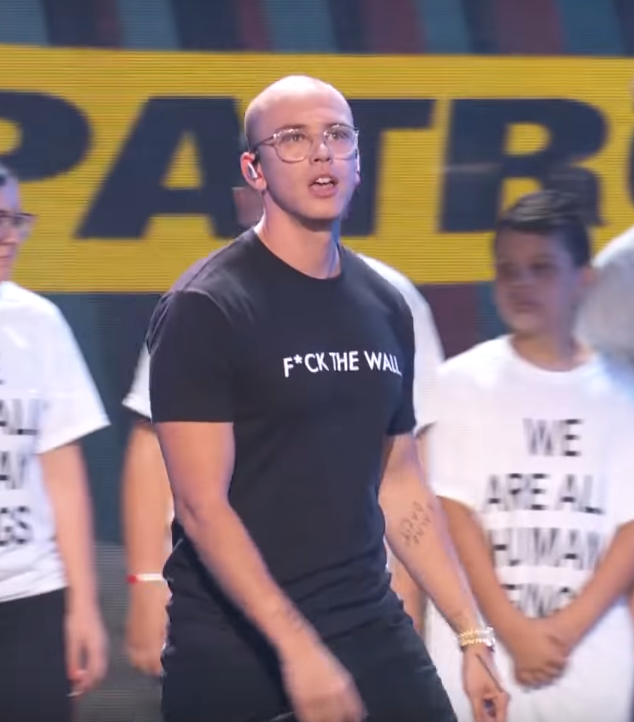
Cara has featured on Logic's song "1-800-273-8255".

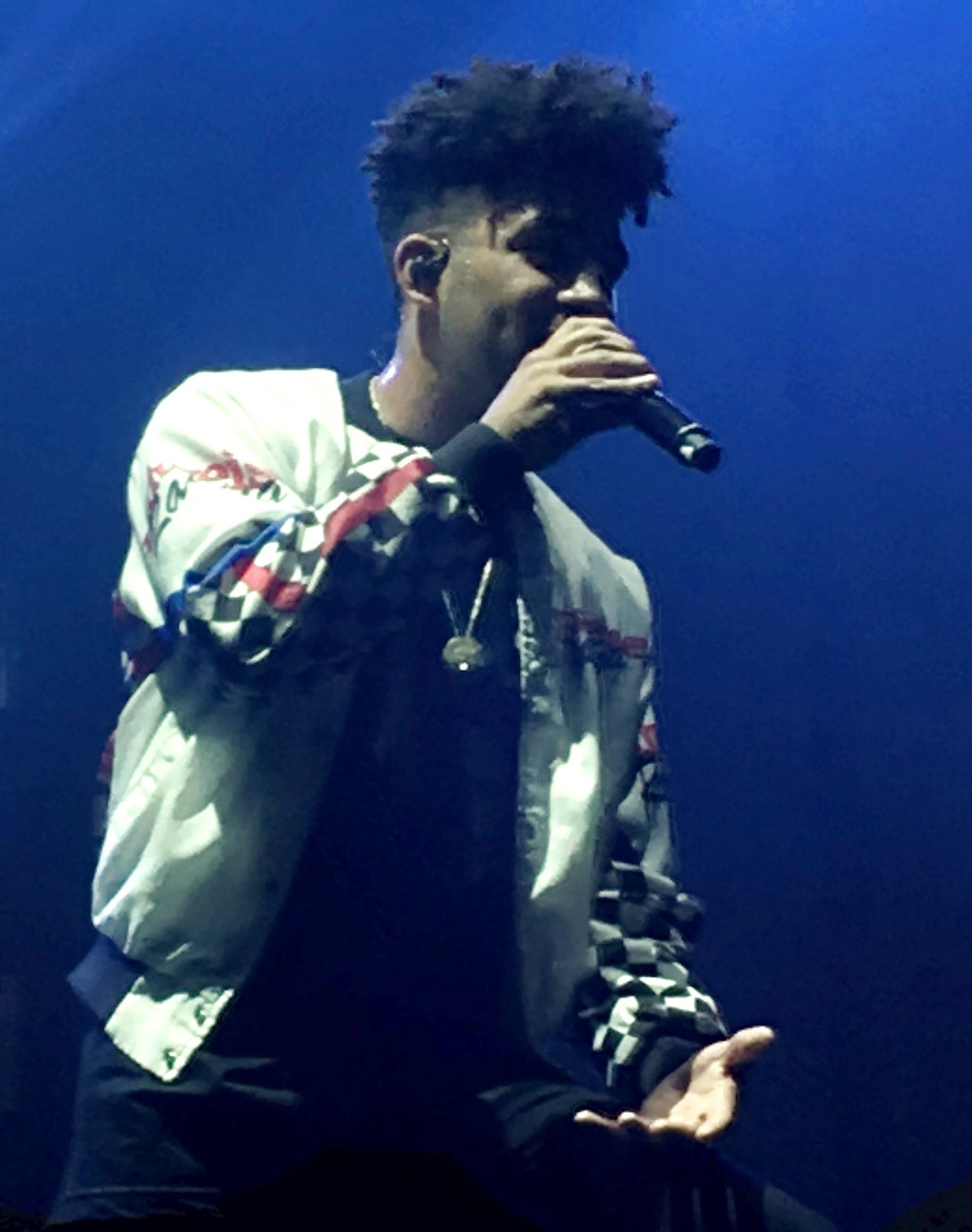
Cara has featured on the song "Babies" by Kyle, who co-wrote "Apartment Song".

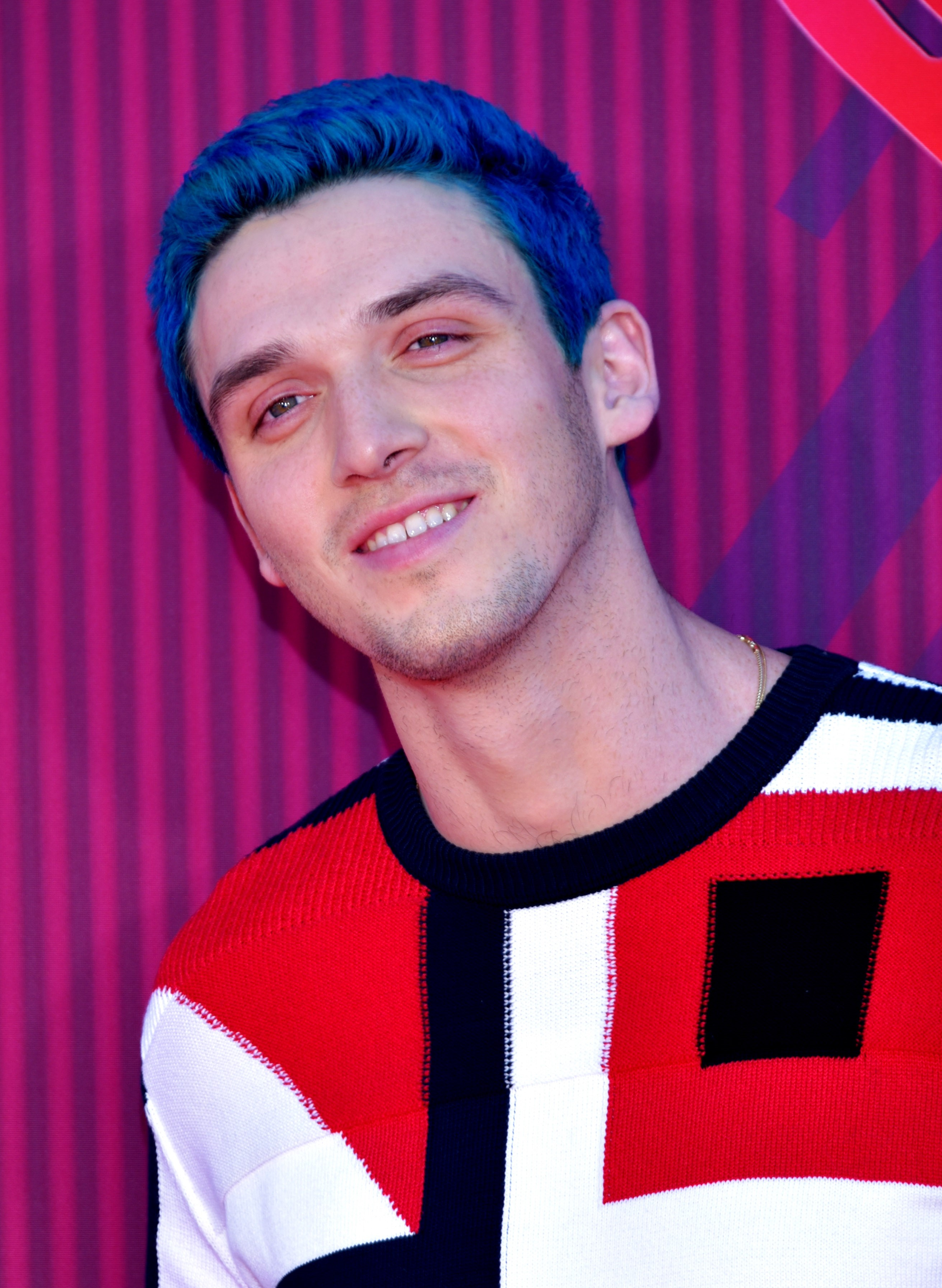
Lauv's song "Canada" features Cara.

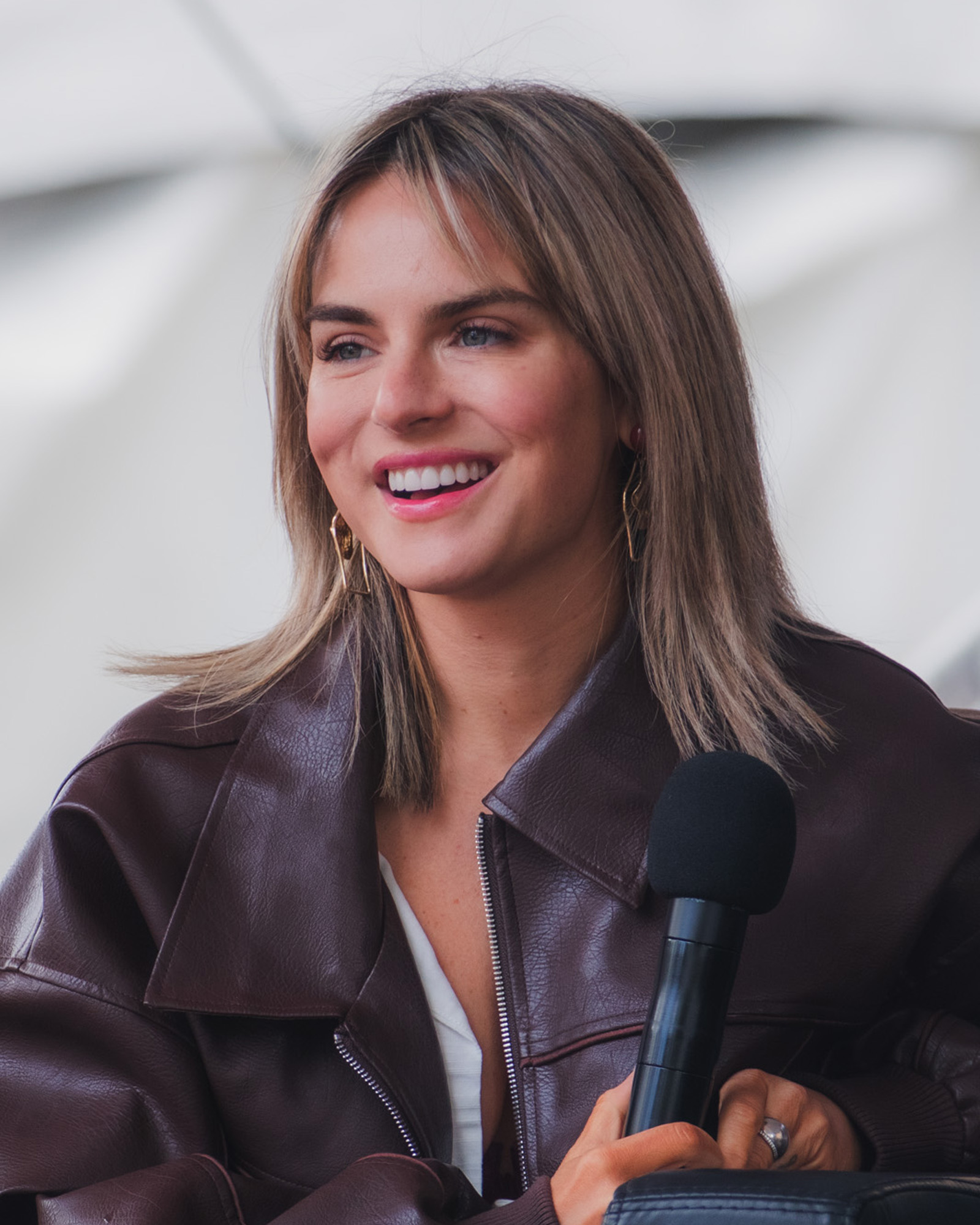
Cara has featured on JoJo's song "I Can Only".

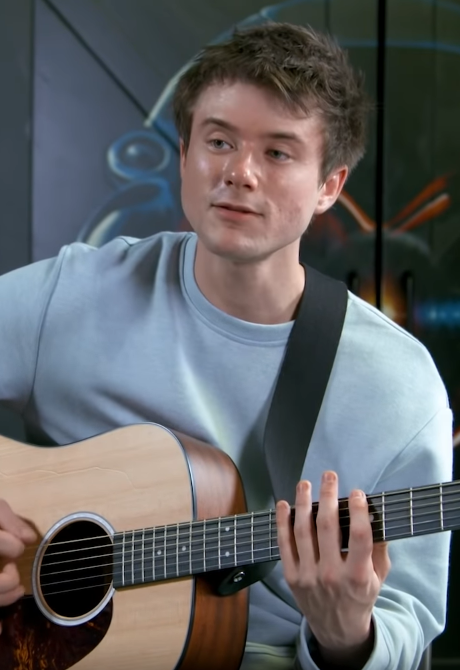
Alec Benjamin's song "Let Me Down Slowly" features Cara.

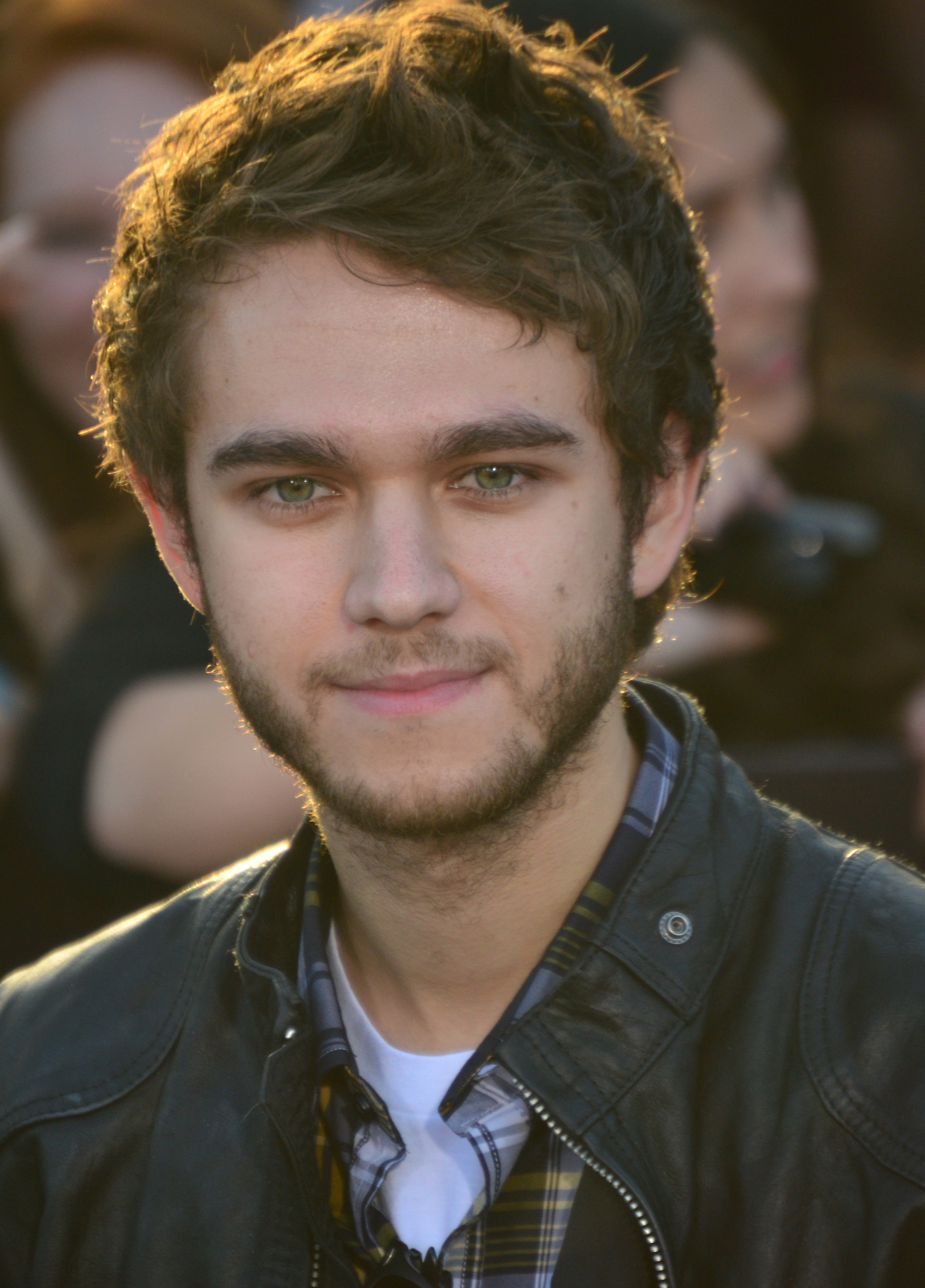
Zedd and Cara collaborated on the song "Stay" in 2017.

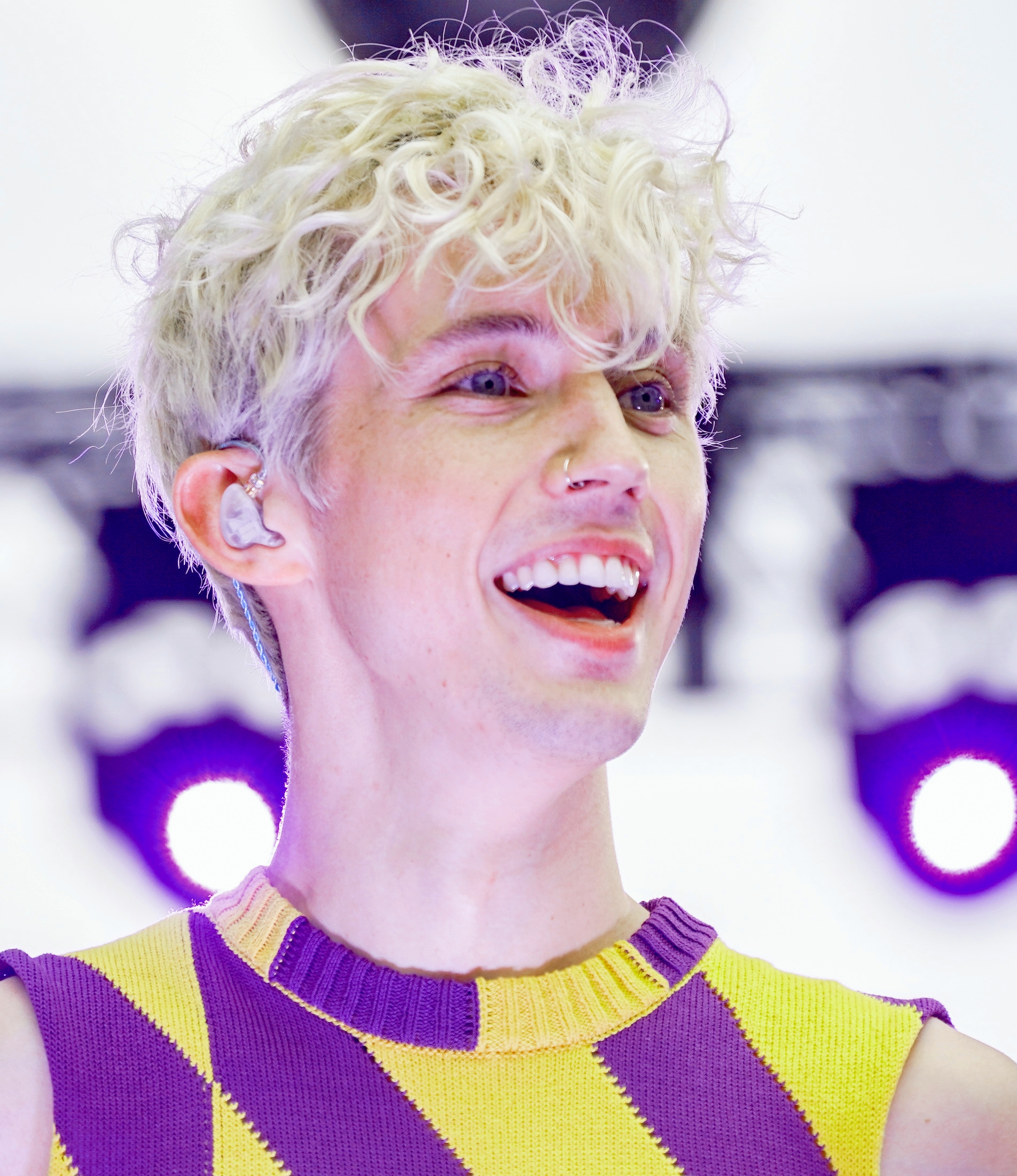
Cara has featured on Troye Sivan's song "Wild".

Key
‡	Indicates songs written solely by Alessia Caracciolo (Note: Alessia Caracciolo is Cara's birth name.)

Name of song, featured performers, writer(s), original release, and year of release
Song	Artist(s)	Writer(s)	Original release	Year	Ref.
"1-800-273-8255"	Logic featuring Alessia Cara and Khalid	Sir Robert Bryson Hall II; Dylan Wiggins; Arjun Ivatury; Alessia Caracciolo; Khalid Robinson; Andrew Taggart	Everybody	2017	
"7 Days"	Alessia Cara	Alessia Caracciolo; Andrew "Pop" Wansel; Warren "Oak" Felder	The Pains of Growing	2018	
"All We Know"	Alessia Cara	Alessia Caracciolo; Andrew "Pop" Wansel; Warren "Oak" Felder; Trevor Brown; William Simmons	The Pains of Growing	2018	
"Another Place"	Bastille and Alessia Cara	Mark Crew; Dan Smith; Dan Priddy	Doom Days	2019	
"Apartment Song"	Alessia Cara	Alessia Caracciolo; Joel Little; Kyle Harvey	In the Meantime	2021	
"Babies"	Kyle featuring Alessia Cara	Kyle Harvey; Alessia Caracciolo; Axel Morgan; Joshua Portillo; Mark Landon; Aaron Vigil	Light of Mine	2018	
"Best Days"	Alessia Cara	Alessia Caracciolo; Jon Levine	In the Meantime	2021	
"Bluebird"	Alessia Cara	Alessia Caracciolo; Albert A. Beach; Cameron Breithaupt; Charles Trenet	In the Meantime	2021	
"Box in the Ocean"	Alessia Cara	Alessia Caracciolo; Jon Levine	In the Meantime	2021	
"Canada"	Lauv featuring Alessia Cara	Ari Leff; Alessia Caracciolo; Marshall Kenneth Vore; Phoebe Bridgers; Jonathan Simpson	How I'm Feeling	2020	
"The Christmas Song" (cover)	Alessia Cara	Mel Tormé; Robert Wells	Holiday Stuff	2019	
"Clockwork"	Alessia Cara	Alessia Caracciolo; Greg Kurstin	In the Meantime	2021	
"Comfortable"	Alessia Cara	Alessia Caracciolo; Ernest Wilson; Steve Wyreman; Nathaniel Mercureau	The Pains of Growing	2018	
"Cuore nerd"	J-Ax and Fedez featuring Alessia Cara	Alessandro Merli; Federico Lucia; Alessandro Aleotti; Fabio Clemente; Federica Abbate; Daniele Lazzarin	Comunisti col Rolex	2017	
"Dead Man"	Alessia Cara	Alessia Caracciolo; Mike Elizondo	Love & Hyperbole	2024	
"Drama Queen"	Alessia Cara	Alessia Caracciolo; Alyssa Reid; Nathan Ferraro; Jamie Appleby; Soran Dussaigne	In the Meantime	2021	
"Easier Said"	Alessia Cara	Alessia Caracciolo; Andrew "Pop" Wansel; Warren "Oak" Felder; Trevor Brown; William Simmons	The Pains of Growing	2018	
"Enter Sandman" (cover)	Alessia Cara and The Warning	James Hetfield; Lars Ulrich; Kirk Hammett	The Metallica Blacklist	2021	
"Fav Boy"	Ricky Reed, John-Robert and Alessia Cara	Eric Frederic; Columbus Smith III; Alessia Caracciolo; Jensen Paige McRae; John-Robert Rimel; Scott Harper; Zachary Sekoff	The Room	2020	
"Feel You Now"	Alessia Cara	Alessia Caracciolo; Gerald Trottman; Ghian Wright; Kayla Morrison; Michael Hodges	Blade Runner: Black Lotus (Original Television Soundtrack)	2021	
"Find My Boy"	Alessia Cara	Alessia Caracciolo; Michael Joseph Wise	In the Meantime	2021	
"Fire"	Alessia Cara	Alessia Caracciolo ‡	Love & Hyperbole	2025	
"Fishbowl"	Alessia Cara	Alessia Caracciolo; Michael Joseph Wise	In the Meantime	2021	
"Four Pink Walls"	Alessia Cara	Alessia Caracciolo ‡	Know-It-All	2015	
"Frosty the Snowman" (cover)	Pentatonix featuring Alessia Cara	Steve Nelson; Walter Rollins	Evergreen	2021	
"Girl Next Door"	Alessia Cara	Alessia Caracciolo; Kaleb Rollins; Marc Soto	The Pains of Growing	2018	
"Growing Pains"	Alessia Cara	Alessia Caracciolo; Andrew "Pop" Wansel; Warren "Oak" Felder	The Pains of Growing	2018	
"Hell and High Water"	Major Lazer featuring Alessia Cara	Thomas Wesley Pentz; Philip Meckseper; Jasper Helderman; Bas van Daalen; Mickey Karbrl; Alessia Caracciolo	Music Is the Weapon	2020	
"Here"	Alessia Cara	Alessia Caracciolo; Andrew "Pop" Wansel; Warren "Oak" Felder; Coleridge Tillman; Samuel Gerongco; Robert Gerongco; Terence Lam; Isaac Hayes	Know-It-All	2015	
"Himno a La Alegria"	Various artists	Amado Regueiro Rodríguez; Ludwig van Beethoven; Osvaldo Nicolás Ferraro Gutierrez	Non-album single	2021	
"How Far I'll Go"	Alessia Cara	Lin-Manuel Miranda	Moana (Original Motion Picture Soundtrack)	2016	
"I Can Only"	JoJo featuring Alessia Cara	Joanna Levesque; Jussi "Jussifer" Karvinen; Justin Tranter; Hayley Warner; Alessia Caracciolo	Mad Love	2016	
"I Choose" (From the Netflix Original Film The Willoughbys)	Alessia Cara	Alessia Caracciolo; Brayden Deskins; Colton Fisher; Diana Studenberg; Jason Rabinowitz; Jon Levine; Jordyn Kane; Kris Pearn; Mark Mothersbaugh	Non-album single	2020	
"I Don't Want To"	Alessia Cara	Alessia Caracciolo ‡	The Pains of Growing	2018	
"I Guess That's Why They Call It the Blues" (cover)	Alessia Cara	Bernie Taupin; Davey Johnstone; Elton John	Revamp: The Songs of Elton John & Bernie Taupin	2018	
"I Miss You, Don't Call Me"	Alessia Cara	Alessia Caracciolo; Jon Levine	In the Meantime	2021	
"I'm Like a Bird" (cover)	Alessia Cara	Nelly Furtado	Spotify Singles	2019	
"I'm Yours"	Alessia Cara	Alessia Caracciolo; Andrew "Pop" Wansel; Warren "Oak" Felder; Coleridge Tillman	Know-It-All	2015	
"(Isn't It) Obvious"	Alessia Cara	Alessia Caracciolo; Jakob Rabitsch	Love & Hyperbole	2024	
"Jingle Bell Rock" (cover)	Alessia Cara	Jim Boothe; Joe Beal	Non-album single	2021	
"Last Goodbye"	Alessia Cara	Alessia Caracciolo; Gerald Trottman; Kayla Morrison; Michael Hodges	Blade Runner: Black Lotus (Original Television Soundtrack)	2021	
"Let Me Down Slowly"	Alec Benjamin featuring Alessia Cara	Alec Benjamin; Nolan Lambroza; Michael Pollack	Narrated for You	2018	
"Lie to Me"	Alessia Cara	Alessia Caracciolo; Matthew Samuels; Miloš Angelov; Johann Deterville; Clément Langlois-Légaré; Zacharie Raymond; Yannick Rastogi	In the Meantime	2021	
"Like You"	Alessia Cara	Alessia Caracciolo ‡	This Summer	2019	
"A Little More"	Alessia Cara	Alessia Caracciolo ‡	The Pains of Growing	2018	
"Make It to Christmas"	Alessia Cara	Alessia Caracciolo; Jon Levine	Holiday Stuff (Expanded)	2019	
"Middle Ground"	Alessia Cara featuring Chika	Alessia Caracciolo; Michael Joseph Wise; Jane Chika Oranika	In the Meantime	2021	
"Moody's Mood for Love" (cover)	Alessia Cara	Dorothy Fields; Eddie Jefferson; James Moody; Jimmy McHugh	Holiday Stuff	2019	
"My Kind"	Alessia Cara	Alessia Caracciolo; Nathaniel Mercureau	The Pains of Growing	2018	
"My Song"	Alessia Cara	Alessia Caracciolo; Coleridge Tillman; Fredrik "Fredro" Ödesjö; Per Eklund; Björn Hallberg	Know-It-All	2015	
"Nintendo Game"	Alessia Cara	Alessia Caracciolo; Kaleb Rollins; Marc Soto	The Pains of Growing	2018	
"Not Today"	Alessia Cara	Alessia Caracciolo ‡	The Pains of Growing	2018	
"October"	Alessia Cara	Alessia Caracciolo; Jon Levine	This Summer	2019	
"Okay Okay"	Alessia Cara	Alessia Caracciolo; Jon Levine	This Summer	2019	
"The Only Thing Missing"	Alessia Cara	Alessia Caracciolo; Jon Levine	Holiday Stuff	2019	
"Only You"	Eddie Benjamin and Alessia Cara	Alessia Caracciolo; Daniel Hackett; Eddie Benjamin	Weatherman	2023	
"The Other Side"	Alessia Cara	Alessia Caracciolo; Warren "Oak" Felder; Emily Warren; Scott Harris	The Get Down Part II: Original Soundtrack From the Netflix Original Series	2017	
"Out of Love"	Alessia Cara	Alessia Caracciolo; Richard Nowels Jr.	The Pains of Growing	2018	
"Outlaws"	Alessia Cara	Alessia Caracciolo; Andrew "Pop" Wansel; Warren "Oak" Felder; Coleridge Tillman; Samuel Gerongco; Robert Gerongco	Know-It-All	2015	
"Overdose"	Alessia Cara	Alessia Caracciolo; Andrew "Pop" Wansel; Warren "Oak" Felder; Coleridge Tillman; Samuel Gerongco; Robert Gerongco	Know-It-All	2015	
"Querer Mejor"	Juanes featuring Alessia Cara	Juan Esteban Aristizábal; Alessia Caracciolo; Marco Masís; Rafael Arcaute; Ricardo Montaner; Mauricio Montaner; Camilo Echeverry	Más futuro que pasado	2019	
"Ready"	Alessia Cara	Alessia Caracciolo; Jon Levine	This Summer	2019	
"Remember Home"	Sebastian Kole featuring Alessia Cara	Coleridge Tillman	Soup	2016	
"River of Tears"	Alessia Cara	Alessia Caracciolo; Coleridge Tillman	Know-It-All	2015	
"Rooting for You"	Alessia Cara	Alessia Caracciolo; Jon Levine	This Summer	2019	
"Scars to Your Beautiful"	Alessia Cara	Alessia Caracciolo; Andrew "Pop" Wansel; Warren "Oak" Felder; Coleridge Tillman; Justin Franks	Know-It-All	2015	
"Seventeen"	Alessia Cara	Alessia Caracciolo; Andrew "Pop" Wansel; Warren "Oak" Felder; Coleridge Tillman; Samuel Gerongco; Robert Gerongco; William Robinson Jr. Ronald White	Know-It-All	2015	
"Shapeshifter"	Alessia Cara	Alessia Caracciolo; Salaam Remi	In the Meantime	2021	
"Slow Lie"	Alessia Cara	Alessia Caracciolo; Jeff Halavacs; Jake Torrey	In the Meantime	2021	
"Slow Motion"	Alessia Cara	Alessia Caracciolo; Matthew Dean Brettle; Jake Nathan Gosling; Mike Elizondo; Isaac Stuart	Love & Hyperbole	2025	
"Somebody Else"	Alessia Cara	Alessia Caracciolo; Martin McKinney; Dylan Wiggins	In the Meantime	2021	
"Stars"	Alessia Cara	Alessia Caracciolo; Coleridge Tillman; Samuel Gerongco; Robert Gerongco; Terence Lam	Know-It-All	2015	
"Stay"	Zedd and Alessia Cara	Linus Wiklund; Sarah Aarons; Anders Frøen; Alessia Caracciolo; Anton Zaslavski; Jonnali Parmenius	Stay +	2017	
"Stone"	Alessia Cara featuring Sebastian Kole	Alessia Caracciolo; James Ho; Coleridge Tillman	Know-It-All	2015	
"Summertime" (cover)	Alessia Cara	Dorothy Kuhns; DuBose Heyward; George Gershwin; Ira Gershwin	This Summer: Live off the Floor	2020	
"Sweet Dream"	Alessia Cara	Alessia Caracciolo; Jason Evigan; Jon Levine; Caroline Ailin; Spencer Stewart	In the Meantime	2021	
"Trust My Lonely"	Alessia Cara	Alessia Caracciolo; Andrew "Pop" Wansel; Warren "Oak" Felder	The Pains of Growing	2018	
"Unboxing Intro"	Alessia Cara	Alessia Caracciolo; Jon Levine	In the Meantime	2021	
"The Use in Trying"	Alessia Cara	Alessia Caracciolo; Jon Levine	Non-album single	2021	
"Vale per sempre"	Eros Ramazzotti featuring Alessia Cara	Federica Abbate; Cheope; Dario Faini; Eros Ramazzotti; Ray Heffernan; Tommaso Paradiso	Vita ce n'è	2018	
"Voice in My Head"	Alessia Cara	Alessia Caracciolo; Mathieu Jomphe Lépine	In the Meantime	2021	
"Welcome Back"	Ali Gatie featuring Alessia Cara	Amy Allen; Alessia Caracciolo; Ali Gatie; Blake Slatkin	Non-album single	2020	
"What I Wouldn't Do / North Star Calling"	Artists for Feel Out Loud	Jerrod Bettis; Leela Gilday; Serena Ryder	Non-album single	2023	
"What's on Your Mind?"	Alessia Cara	Alessia Caracciolo; Mike Sabath	This Summer	2019	
"Wherever I Live"	Alessia Cara	Alessia Caracciolo ‡	The Pains of Growing	2018	
"Wild"	Troye Sivan featuring Alessia Cara	Troye Sivan; Alex Hope; Alessia Caracciolo	Blue Neighbourhood	2016	
"Wild Things"	Alessia Cara	Alessia Caracciolo; James Ho; Coleridge Tillman; Thabiso "Tab" Nkhereanye	Know-It-All	2015	
"WTSGD"	Clay and Alessia Cara	Alessia Caracciolo; Gabrielle Walter-Clay	Non-album single	2022	
"You Let Me Down"	Alessia Cara	Alessia Caracciolo; Michael Joseph Wise	In the Meantime	2021	
