= Alessia Cara discography =

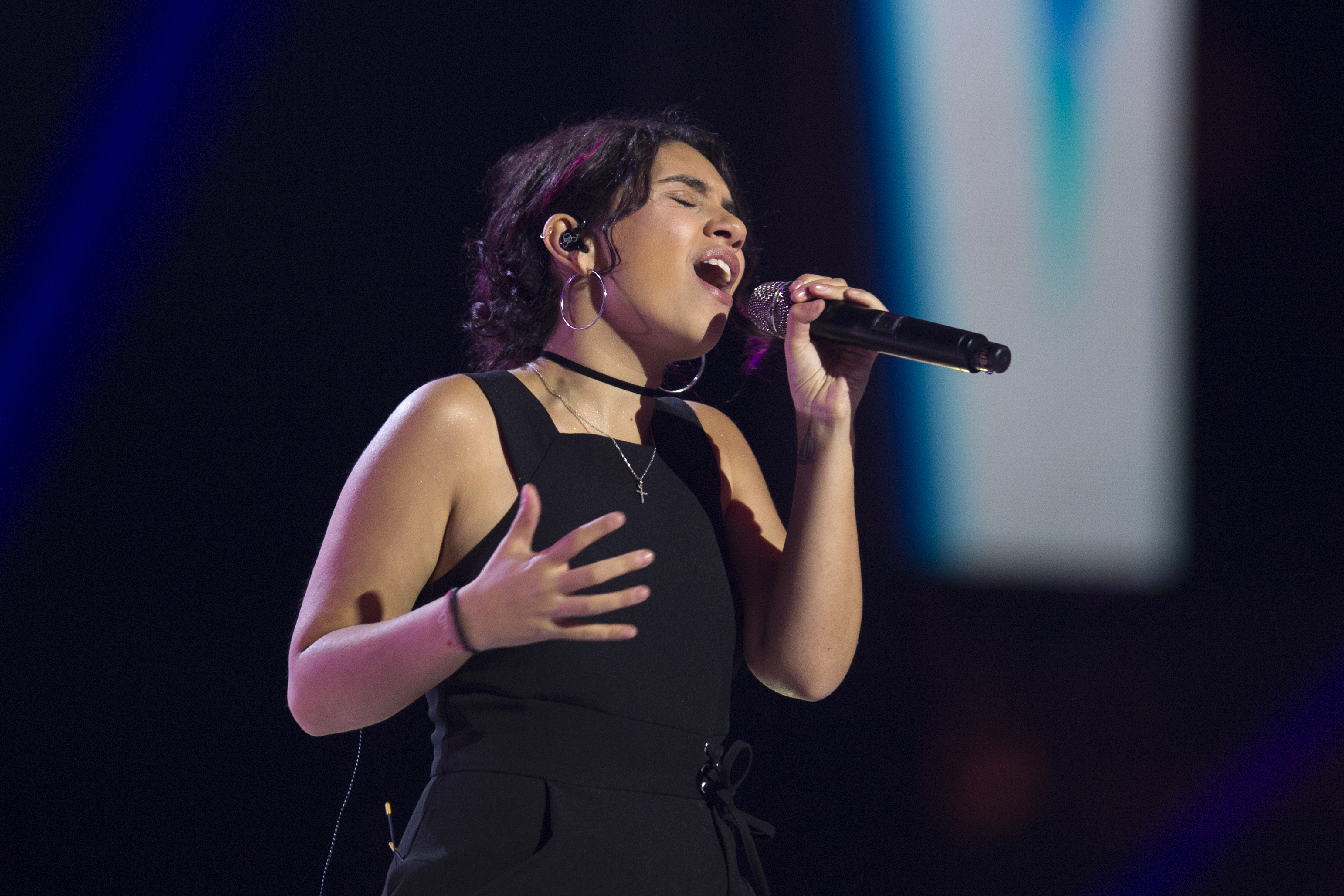
- Cara performing in 2017.
- Studio albums: 4
- EPs: 4
- Live albums: 2
- Compilation albums: 4
- Singles: 23
- Music videos: 31
- Promotional singles: 10

Canadian singer-songwriter Alessia Cara has released four studio albums, two live albums, four extended plays, twenty-three singles (including five as a featured artist), ten promotional singles and thirty music videos. She signed to EP Entertainment and Def Jam Recordings in 2014, and began recording her debut album the same year.

Cara released her debut single, "Here", in April 2015. The song became a sleeper hit, reaching number five in the United States and peaking within the top twenty in Australia, Canada, Iceland, and New Zealand. Cara released her debut studio album, Know-It-All, on November 13, 2015. In February 2016, "Wild Things" impacted contemporary hit radio as the album's second single. Later that same year, Cara found greater success in the release of her third single, "Scars to Your Beautiful". The single reached the top ten on the Billboard Hot 100 and topped the US pop radio charts, becoming her second song to do so. In November 2016, she released a single entitled "How Far I'll Go" for Disney animated film Moana. In 2017, Cara collaborated with producer Zedd to create the single "Stay", which reached number seven on the Billboard Hot 100 and became her third chart-topper on the US Mainstream Top 40 chart. She also collaborated with rapper Logic to feature in his single "1-800-273-8255", which reached number three on the Billboard Hot 100.

The lead single from Cara's second studio album, The Pains of Growing, called "Growing Pains" was released on June 15, 2018, and charted at number 65 on the Billboard Hot 100 and number 36 in Cara's native Canada. "Trust My Lonely" and "Out of Love" were released as the second and third singles from the album, respectively. The Pains of Growing was released on November 30, 2018. In 2019, she featured on a remix of Alec Benjamin's "Let Me Down Slowly", which opened at number 79 on the Billboard Hot 100. Cara then made her Spanish-language debut on "Querer Mejor", a collaboration with Colombian singer Juanes, which reached number one in Colombia, El Salvador, Nicaragua and Panama. She released her third EP, This Summer, on September 6, 2019, which spawned two singles: "Ready" and "Rooting For You", the latter of which reached number 47 in Canada. She then released "Make It to Christmas", which charted internationally. Throughout 2020, Cara released non-album singles and collaborations, including her contribution to the soundtrack of The Willoughbys with "I Choose". The same year, Cara released her first live album, This Summer: Live off the Floor, and her fourth EP, Holiday Stuff.

The lead single from Cara's third studio album, In the Meantime, entitled "Sweet Dream", was released on July 15, 2021 and peaked at number 51 in Canada. Three promotional singles were released in support of the album: "Shapeshifter", followed by "Best Days", and "You Let Me Down". In the Meantime was released on September 24, 2021. Throughout the year, Cara also released numerous collaborations and contributed to several soundtracks, beginning with "The Use in Trying" for PAW Patrol: The Movie, as well as "Feel You Now" and "Last Goodbye" for Blade Runner: Black Lotus. She was featured on The Metallica Blacklist, and performed a cover of "Enter Sandman" alongside Mexican rock band The Warning, which appeared at number 13 on the Hard Rock Songs chart. Furthermore, Cara collaborated with American a capella group Pentatonix on a cover of "Frosty the Snowman", and released a cover of "Jingle Bell Rock" exclusive to Amazon Music, which charted at number 98 in the United Kingdom.

Cara released her fourth studio album, Love & Hyperbole, on February 14, 2025. The lead single of which was released on July 19, 2024, titled "Dead Man". Following the album's release, "Fire" was released as the second single. Cara subsequently contributed to the soundtrack of Nobody Wants This with the song, "My House", which was released on October 23, 2025. To commemorate the anniversary of Love & Hyperbole, Cara announced on February 13, 2026, that she would release her second live album, Love or Lack Thereof. The album was released on March 20, 2026 and featured collaborations with singers Nelly Furtado and Norah Jones.

== Albums ==
=== Studio albums ===
List of studio albums, with selected chart positions, sales figures and certifications
Title	Details	Peak chart positions										Certifications
Title	Details	CAN	AUS	DEN	GER	IRE	NL	NZ	SWE	UK	US	Certifications
Know-It-All	Released: November 13, 2015; Label: Def Jam, EP Entertainment; Formats: CD, LP, digital download, streaming	8	16	19	99	52	34	26	21	14	9	MC: 3× Platinum; ARIA: Gold; BPI: Gold; IFPI DEN: Platinum; RIAA: 2× Platinum; RMNZ: 2× Platinum
The Pains of Growing	Released: November 30, 2018; Label: Def Jam, EP Entertainment; Formats: CD, LP, digital download, streaming	21	76	—	—	—	78	—	—	—	71	MC: Gold
In the Meantime	Released: September 24, 2021; Label: Def Jam, EP Entertainment; Formats: CD, LP, digital download, streaming	83	—	—	—	—	—	—	—	—	— (Note: In the Meantime did not make the Billboard 200, but did chart at number 81 on the Top Album Sales chart.)	
Love & Hyperbole	Released: February 14, 2025; Label: Def Jam, EP Entertainment; Formats: CD, LP, digital download, streaming	—	—	—	—	—	—	—	—	—	— (Note: Love & Hyperbole did not chart on the Billboard 200, but did chart at number 41 on the US Top Album Sales chart.)	
"—" denotes a recording that did not chart or was not released in that territory.

=== Live albums ===
List of live albums, with selected chart positions
Title	Details	Peak chart positions	
Title	Details	AUS Jazz	US Con. Jazz
This Summer: Live off the Floor	Released: July 17, 2020; Labels: Def Jam, Universal Music Canada; Formats: Digital download, streaming, LP	—	—
Love or Lack Thereof	Released: March 20, 2026; Label: Def Jam, EP Entertainment; Formats: Digital download, streaming	8	5

== Extended plays ==
List of extended plays, with selected chart positions
Title	Details	Peak chart positions		
Title	Details	CAN	NZ	US
Four Pink Walls	Released: August 28, 2015; Label: Def Jam, EP Entertainment; Format: CD, digital download	11	21	31
Spotify Singles	Released: April 24, 2019; Label: Def Jam; Format: Digital download, streaming	—	—	—
This Summer	Released: September 6, 2019; Label: Def Jam, Universal Music Canada; Format: CD, digital download	52	—	—
Holiday Stuff	Released: December 5, 2020; Labels: Def Jam, UMG Recordings; Formats: Digital download, streaming	—	—	—
"—" denotes a recording that did not chart or was not released in that territory.

== Singles ==
=== As lead artist ===
List of singles as lead artist, with selected chart positions and certifications, showing year released and album name
Title	Year	Peak chart positions										Certifications	Album
Title	Year	CAN	AUS	DEN	GER	IRE	NL	NZ	SWE	UK	US	Certifications	Album
"Here"	2015	19	12	58	59	71	26	15	62	28	5	MC: 5× Platinum; ARIA: 2× Platinum; BPI: Platinum; BVMI: Gold; GLF: Platinum; IFPI DEN: Platinum; PMB: 2× Platinum; RIAA: 5× Platinum; RMNZ: 3× Platinum	Know-It-All
"Wild Things"	2016	14	25	—	76	66	58	12	61	63	50	MC: 5× Platinum; ARIA: 2× Platinum; BPI: Gold; GLF: Platinum; IFPI DEN: Gold; PMB: Platinum; RIAA: 2× Platinum; RMNZ: 3× Platinum	Know-It-All
"Scars to Your Beautiful"	2016	14	8	37	19	35	30	15	10	55	8	MC: 8× Platinum; ARIA: 5× Platinum; BPI: 2× Platinum; BVMI: 3× Gold; GLF: 3× Platinum; IFPI DEN: 2× Platinum; PMB: Diamond; RIAA: 6× Platinum; RMNZ: 5× Platinum	Know-It-All
"How Far I'll Go"	2016	46	15	29	53	26	26	3	7	49	56	MC: 3× Platinum; ARIA: 3× Platinum; BPI: Platinum; GLF: 3× Platinum; IFPI DEN: Platinum; PMB: 2× Platinum; RIAA: 3× Platinum; RMNZ: 3× Platinum	Moana
"Stay" (with Zedd)	2017	9	3	12	13	8	11	9	9	8	7	MC: 8× Platinum; ARIA: 7× Platinum; BPI: 2× Platinum; BVMI: Platinum; GLF: 2× Platinum; IFPI DEN: Platinum; RIAA: 6× Platinum; RMNZ: 4× Platinum	Everything, Everything
"Growing Pains"	2018	36	87	—	—	—	—	— (Note: "Growing Pains" did not enter the NZ Top 40 Singles Chart, but peaked at number five on the NZ Heatseeker Singles Chart.)	—	—	65	MC: Platinum; PMB: Gold; RIAA: Gold	The Pains of Growing
"Trust My Lonely"	2018	55	—	—	—	—	—	— (Note: "Trust My Lonely" did not enter the NZ Top 40 Singles Chart, but peaked at number 25 on the NZ Hot Singles Chart.)	—	—	—	MC: Gold; PMB: Gold	The Pains of Growing
"Out of Love"	2019	62	—	—	—	71	—	—	—	—	— (Note: "Out of Love" did not enter the Billboard Hot 100 chart, but peaked at number 12 on the Bubbling Under Hot 100 chart.)	MC: 3× Platinum; BPI: Silver; IFPI DEN: Gold; PMB: Platinum; RIAA: Gold; RMNZ: Platinum	The Pains of Growing
"Ready"	2019	—	—	—	—	—	—	— (Note: "Ready" did not enter the NZ Top 40 Singles Chart, but peaked at number 17 on the NZ Hot Singles Chart.)	—	—	—	MC: Gold; PMB: Gold	This Summer
"Rooting for You"	2019	47	—	—	—	—	—	— (Note: "Rooting for You" did not enter the NZ Top 40 Singles Chart, but peaked at number 31 on the NZ Hot Singles Chart.)	—	—	—	MC: Platinum	This Summer
"Another Place" (with Bastille)	2019	—	—	—	—	—	—	— (Note: "Another Place" did not enter the NZ Top 40 Singles Chart, but peaked at number 23 on the NZ Hot Singles Chart.)	— (Note: "Another Place" did not enter the Swedish Singellista Chart, but peaked at number 16 on the Swedish Heatseeker Chart.)	—	—	PMB: Gold	Doom Days
"Make It to Christmas"	2019	89	—	—	60	—	—	— (Note: "Make It to Christmas" did not enter the NZ Top 40 Singles Chart, but peaked at number 19 on the NZ Hot Singles Chart.)	— (Note: "Make It to Christmas" did not enter the Swedish Singellista Chart, but peaked at number six on the Swedish Heatseeker Chart.)	—	— (Note: "Make It Christmas" did not enter the Billboard Hot 100 chart, but peaked at number six on the Bubbling Under Hot 100 chart.)		Holiday Stuff
"Sweet Dream"	2021	51	—	—	—	—	—	—	—	—	—	MC: Gold	In the Meantime
"Only You" (with Eddie Benjamin)	2022	—	—	—	—	—	—	—	—	—	—		Weatherman
"Dead Man"	2024	—	—	—	—	—	—	—	—	—	—		Love & Hyperbole
"(Isn't It) Obvious"	2024	—	—	—	—	—	—	—	—	—	—		Love & Hyperbole
"Slow Motion"	2025	—	—	—	—	—	—	—	—	—	—		Love & Hyperbole
"Fire"	2025	—	—	—	—	—	—	—	—	—	—		Love & Hyperbole
"—" denotes a recording that did not chart or was not released in that territory.

=== As featured artist ===
List of singles as featured artist, with selected chart positions and certifications, showing year released and album name
Title	Year	Peak chart positions										Certifications	Album
Title	Year	CAN	AUS	DEN	GER	IRE	NL	NZ	SWE	UK	US	Certifications	Album
"Wild" (Troye Sivan featuring Alessia Cara)	2016	72	26	—	—	—	—	—	—	—	— (Note: "Wild" did not enter the Billboard Hot 100 chart, but peaked at number four on the Bubbling Under Hot 100 Singles chart.)	ARIA: 3× Platinum	Blue Neighbourhood
"1-800-273-8255" (Logic featuring Alessia Cara and Khalid)	2017	6	5	2	45	9	23	6	4	9	3	MC: 5× Platinum; ARIA: 3× Platinum; BPI: 2× Platinum; BVMI: Gold; IFPI DEN: 2× Platinum; PMB: 2× Platinum; RIAA: 8× Platinum; RMNZ: 5× Platinum	Everybody
"Let Me Down Slowly" (Alec Benjamin featuring Alessia Cara)	2019	49	56	6	—	18	25	23	58	31	79	MC: 4× Platinum; ARIA: 2× Platinum; BPI: 2× Platinum; BVMI: Platinum; IFPI DEN: 3× Platinum; PMB: 2× Platinum; RIAA: 4× Platinum; RMNZ: 4× Platinum	Narrated for You
"Querer Mejor" (Juanes featuring Alessia Cara)	2019	—	—	—	—	—	—	—	—	—	—	RIAA: Gold (Latin)	Más futuro que pasado
"Welcome Back" (Ali Gatie featuring Alessia Cara)	2020	84	—	—	—	—	—	— (Note: "Welcome Back" did not enter the NZ Top 40 Singles Chart, but peaked at number 21 on the NZ Hot Singles Chart.)	—	—	— (Note: "Welcome Back" did not enter the Billboard Hot 100 chart, but peaked at number 31 on the Digital Song Sales chart.)		Non-album single
"—" denotes a recording that did not chart or was not released in that territory.

=== Promotional singles ===
List of promotional singles, showing year released and album name
Title	Year	Peak chart positions		Album
Title	Year	CAN CHR	NZ Hot	Album
"A Little More"	2018	—	—	The Pains of Growing
"Not Today"	2018	—	16	The Pains of Growing
"Okay Okay"	2019	—	39	This Summer
"October"	2019	39	30	This Summer
"I Choose"	2020	—	37	The Willoughbys
"Shapeshifter"	2021	—	—	In the Meantime
"The Use in Trying"	2021	—	—	PAW Patrol: The Movie
"Best Days"	2021	—	34	In the Meantime
"WTSGD" (with Clay)	2022	—	—	Breathing into Bloom
"Nighttime Thing" (with Julia Michaels)	2025	—	—	Love & Hyperbole
"—" denotes a recording that did not chart or was not released in that territory.

== Other charted and certified songs ==
Title	Year	Peak chart positions								Certifications	Album
Title	Year	CAN AC	BEL (FL) Tip	ITA	NZ Hot	SWE Heat.	UK	US Dance	US Hard Rock	Certifications	Album
"I'm Yours"	2015	46	—	—	—	—	—	—	—	MC: Gold; RIAA: Gold	Know-It-All
"Seventeen"	2015	—	—	—	—	—	—	—	—	MC: Gold; RIAA: Gold	Know-It-All
"River of Tears"	2015	—	—	—	—	—	—	—	—	MC: Gold; RIAA: Gold	Know-It-All
"Cuore nerd" (J-Ax and Fedez featuring Alessia Cara)	2017	—	—	44	—	—	—	—	—		Comunisti col Rolex
"The Other Side"	2017	—	—	—	—	10	—	—	—		The Get Down Part II
"I'm Like a Bird"	2019	—	—	—	—	—	—	—	—	PMB: Gold	Spotify Singles
"Hell and High Water" (Major Lazer featuring Alessia Cara)	2020	—	21	—	20	20	—	14	—		Music Is the Weapon
"Enter Sandman" (with The Warning)	2021	—	—	—	—	—	—	—	13		The Metallica Blacklist
"Jingle Bell Rock"	2021	—	—	—	—	—	98	—	—		Holiday Stuff (Expanded)
"—" denotes a recording that did not chart or was not released in that territory.

== Guest appearances ==
List of non-single guest appearances, with other performing artists, showing year released and album name
Title	Year	Main artist	Album
"I Can Only"	2016	JoJo	Mad Love
"Remember Home"	2016	Sebastian Kole	Soup
"Cuore Nerd"	2017	J-Ax and Fedez	Comunisti col Rolex
"The Other Side"	2017	—N/a	The Get Down Part II
"I Guess That's Why They Call It the Blues"	2018	—N/a	Revamp: Reimagining the Songs of Elton John & Bernie Taupin
"Babies"	2018	Kyle	Light of Mine
"Vale per Sempre (Vale por Siempre)"	2018	Eros Ramazzotti	Vita Ce N'è (Hay Vida)
"Canada"	2020	Lauv	How I'm Feeling
"Fav Boy"	2020	Ricky Reed	The Room
"Afraid of America"	2020	Scott Helman	Nonsuch Park (SA)
"Hell and High Water"	2020	Major Lazer	Music Is the Weapon
"Himno a la Alegría" (Note: In April 2021, Sony Music Spain, Universal Music Spain and Warner Music Spain teamed up to release a new version of the 1969 Miguel Ríos's song "Himno a la Alegría" to bring light and hope during the COVID-19 pandemic and to pay tribute to its frontline heroes. The track includes vocals by Ríos, Cara, Aitana, Alejandro Lerner, Alejandro Sanz, Alex Ubago, Ana Mena, Andrés Calamaro, Andrés Dvicio, Antonio José, Antonio Orozco, Brian May, Camilo, Carlos Rivera, David Bisbal, Dulce Pontes, Draco, Fher Olvera, India Martínez, Joy, Juanes, Lali, Laura Pausini, Leire Martínez, Luis Cobos, Macaco, Malú, Manolo García, Manuel Carrasco, Mau y Ricky, Melendi, Mikel Izal, Nathy Peluso, Pablo Alborán, Pablo López, Rosario, Rozalén, Sebastián Yatra, Vanesa Martín.)	2021	Various artists	None
"Enter Sandman"	2021	The Warning	The Metallica Blacklist
"Frosty the Snowman"	2021	Pentatonix	Evergreen
"Feel You Now"	2021	—N/a	Blade Runner: Black Lotus
"Last Goodbye"	2021	—N/a	Blade Runner: Black Lotus
"Bed I Made"	2021	Allen Stone	Apart
"What I Wouldn't Do / North Star Calling"	2023	Various artists	None
"My House"	2025	—N/a	Nobody Wants This
"In My Hands"	2026	Boi-1da	What If It All Goes Right?

== Music videos ==
Title	Year	Other artist(s)	Director(s)	Ref.
As lead artist
"Here"	2015	None	Aaron A	
"I'm Yours"	2015	None	Alessia Cara	
"Wild Things"	2016	None	Aaron A	
"Scars to Your Beautiful"	2016	None	Aaron A	
"How Far I'll Go"	2016	None	Aya Tanimura	
"Seventeen"	2016	None	Aaron A	
"Stay"	2017	Zedd	Tim Mattia	
"Growing Pains"	2018	None	Alan Masferrer	
"A Little More"	2018	None	Alessia Cara	
"Trust My Lonely"	2018	None	Aaron A	
"Not Today"	2018	None	Aaron A	
"Out of Love"	2019	None	—N/a	
"Rooting for You"	2019	None	—N/a	
"October"	2019	None	—N/a	
"Another Place"	2019	Bastille	—N/a	
"Sweet Dream"	2021	None	Tusk Creative	
"Shapeshifter"	2021	None	Tusk Creative	
"Best Days"	2021	None	Tusk Creative	
"Enter Sandman"	2021	The Warning	Rudy Joffroy	
"You Let Me Down"	2022	None	Dario Caracciolo	
"Only You"	2022	Eddie Benjamin	—N/a	
"Jingle Bell Rock"	2022	None	Aaron Alter	
"Make It to Christmas"	2022	None	—N/a	
"Dead Man"	2024	None	George Gallardo Kattah	
"(Isn't It) Obvious"	2024	None	Gordy De St. Jeor	
"Fire"	2025	None	Dario Caracciolo	
"Apartment Song"	2026	None	Dario Caracciolo	
As featured artist
"Wild"	2016	Troye Sivan	Malia James	
"1-800-273-8255"	2017	Logic, Khalid	Andy Hines	
"Babies"	2018	Kyle	Christo	
"Let Me Down Slowly"	2019	Alec Benjamin	—N/a	
"Querer Mejor"	2019	Juanes	Aaron A	
"Welcome Back"	2020	Ali Gatie	Kid Studio	
Guest appearances
"If the World Was Ending (In Support of Doctors Without Borders)"	2020	JP Saxe, Julia Michaels & Friends	—N/a	
