= Pop Wansel =

American songwriter

- Born: Andrew Wansel; April 27, 1988 (age 38)
- Origin: Philadelphia, Pennsylvania, U.S.
- Genres: Pop; R&B; hip hop
- Occupations: Songwriter; record producer; musician
- Member of: Pop & Oak

Andrew "Pop" Wansel (born April 27, 1988) is an American songwriter and record producer from Philadelphia. The son of Philadelphia soul musician Dexter Wansel, Pop grew up in the music industry and began writing and producing his own music at the age of ten, citing rapper Nas and Motown songwriting team Holland–Dozier–Holland as his early inspirations.

In 2008, Pop reached out to Nicki Minaj via Myspace message looking to collaborate. After her initial interest, he sent her an idea that would eventually become the basis for "Your Love". Nicki recorded the track and the unmastered demo subsequently leaked in 2009, landing at No. 1 on Billboard's Hot Rap Songs.

== Discography ==
=== Production and songwriting credits ===
Year	Title	Artist	Album
2009	"Hair"	Ashley Tisdale	Guilty Pleasure
2009	"Know You By Heart"	Marié Digby	Breathing Underwater
2010	"Your Love"	Nicki Minaj	Pink Friday; RIAA: Platinum
2010	"Save Me"	Nicki Minaj	Pink Friday; RIAA: Platinum
2010	"Muny"	Nicki Minaj	Pink Friday; RIAA: Platinum
2011	"Marvin & Chardonnay" (featuring Kanye West and Roscoe Dash)	Big Sean	Finally Famous
2012	"Numb" (featuring Eminem)	Rihanna	Unapologetic; RIAA: Platinum
2012	"Bassline"	Chris Brown	Fortune
2013	"Bang Bang"	Dizzee Rascal	The Fifth
2014	"Good Kisser"	Usher	Hard II Love (Japanese edition)
2014	"Troubeaux" (featuring Nas)	Jennifer Lopez	A.K.A.
2014	"Break Your Heart Right Back" (featuring Childish Gambino)	Ariana Grande	My Everything; RIAA: 2× Platinum
2014	"Chasing Time"	Azealia Banks	Broke with Expensive Taste
2014	"Seal Me with a Kiss" (featuring De La Soul)	Jessie J	Sweet Talker
2014	"The Crying Game" (featuring Jessie Ware)	Nicki Minaj	The Pinkprint; RIAA: 2× Platinum
2015	"Here" RIAA: 5× Platinum	Alessia Cara	Know-It-All
2015	"Trade Hearts" (featuring Julia Michaels)	Jason Derulo	Everything Is 4 RIAA: Gold
2015	"Say It" RIAA: 3× Platinum	Tory Lanez	I Told You; RIAA: Gold
2015	"Over Getting Over"	Fleur East	Love, Sax and Flashbacks
2015	"Never Say When"	Fleur East	Love, Sax and Flashbacks
2016	"LA Confidential" RIAA: Gold	Tory Lanez	Non-album single
2016	"Distraction" RIAA: Platinum	Kehlani	SweetSexySavage; RIAA: Gold
2016	"Scars to Your Beautiful" RIAA: 5× Platinum	Alessia Cara	Know-It-All; RIAA: Platinum
2017	"Piece of Mind"	Kehlani	SweetSexySavage; RIAA: Gold
2017	"Not Used to It"	Kehlani	SweetSexySavage; RIAA: Gold
2017	"Everything is Yours"	Kehlani	SweetSexySavage; RIAA: Gold
2017	"Advice"	Kehlani	SweetSexySavage; RIAA: Gold
2017	"Escape"	Kehlani	SweetSexySavage; RIAA: Gold
2017	"In My Feelings"	Kehlani	SweetSexySavage; RIAA: Gold
2017	"Hold Me by the Heart"	Kehlani	SweetSexySavage; RIAA: Gold
2017	"Thank You"	Kehlani	SweetSexySavage; RIAA: Gold
2017	"Did I"	Kehlani	SweetSexySavage; RIAA: Gold
2017	"Shockandawe"	Miguel	Non-album single
2017	Midnight	Jessie Ware	Glasshouse
2017	"Infinite Stripes" (featuring Ty Dolls $ign)	Cashmere Cat	9
2018	"Only Love"	Mary J. Blige	Only Love
2018	"Growing Pains"	Alessia Cara	The Pains of Growing
2018	"Trust My Lonely"	Alessia Cara	The Pains of Growing
2018	"7 Days"	Alessia Cara	The Pains of Growing
2018	"All We Know"	Alessia Cara	The Pains of Growing
2018	"Easier Said"	Alessia Cara	The Pains of Growing
2019	"Fake Smile"	Ariana Grande	Thank U, Next; RIAA: 2× Platinum
2019	"Imagine"	Ariana Grande	Thank U, Next; RIAA: 2× Platinum
2019	"In My Head"	Ariana Grande	Thank U, Next; RIAA: 2× Platinum
2019	"Megatron"	Nicki Minaj	Non-album single
2019	"Chase"	Aaron Carpenter	Non-album single
2019	"The World Is Mine"	Samm Henshaw	The World Is Mine
2019	"What You Did" (featuring Ella Mai)	Mahalia	Love and Compromise
2019	"How Things Used To Be"	Ali Gatie	YOU
2019	"It's You" RIAA: Platinum	Ali Gatie	YOU
2019	"Deep in Shallow Water"	Bryce Vine	Carnival
2020	"Hit My Phone" (featuring Kehlani)	Megan Thee Stallion	Suga; RIAA: Gold
2020	"Can I" (featuring Tory Lanez)	Kehlani	It Was Good Until It Wasn't
2020	"Change Your Life" (featuring Jhené Aiko)	Kehlani	It Was Good Until It Wasn't
2020	"Can You Blame Me" (featuring Lucky Daye)	Kehlani	It Was Good Until It Wasn't
2020	"Open (Passionate)"	Kehlani	It Was Good Until It Wasn't
2020	"Slow It Down"	Ty Dolla Sign	Featuring Ty Dolla Sign
2020	"Liquor Love"	Kennedi	(Self EP)
2020	"Peppers and Onions"	Tierra Whack	Non-album single
2021	"Someone like U (interlude)"	Ariana Grande	Positions; RIAA: Platinum
2021	"My Girlfriends Are My Boyfriend" (featuring Saweetie)	Demi Lovato	Dancing with the Devil... the Art of Starting Over
2021	"Like A Pro"	Kash Doll	Like A Pro
2021	"Do It Again"	Brianna Castro	Do It Again
2021	"Standards"	Jordan Ward	Remain Calm
2021	"Unforgettable"	Demi Lovato	Unforgettable (Tommy's Song)
2021	"Outlaws""	Alessia Cara	Not Another Love Song
2022	"little story"	Kehlani	Blue Water Road (executive producer)
2022	"any give sunday " (featuring Blxst)	Kehlani	Blue Water Road (executive producer)
2022	"shooter interlude"	Kehlani	Blue Water Road (executive producer)
2022	"wish i never"	Kehlani	Blue Water Road (executive producer)
2022	"up at night" (featuring Justin Bieber)	Kehlani	Blue Water Road (executive producer)
2022	"get me started" (featuring Syd)	Kehlani	Blue Water Road (executive producer)
2022	"everything interlude"	Kehlani	Blue Water Road (executive producer)
2022	"more than i should" (featuring Jessie Reyez)	Kehlani	Blue Water Road (executive producer)
2022	"altar"	Kehlani	Blue Water Road (executive producer)
2022	"melt"	Kehlani	Blue Water Road (executive producer)
2022	"tangerine"	Kehlani	Blue Water Road (executive producer)
2022	"everything"	Kehlani	Blue Water Road (executive producer)
2022	"wondering/wandering" (featuring Thundercat & Ambré)	Kehlani	Blue Water Road (executive producer)
2022	"Earth Is Ghetto"	Aliah Sheffield	Earth is Ghetto
2022	"Can't Win For Nothing and Sacrifices"	Symba	Results Take Time
2022	"Stranger Things"	Ally Salort	
2022	"Nostalgic"	Ally Salort	
2022	"Lemons"	Muni Long	Public Displays Of Affection: The Album
2022	"Numb"	Brieanna Castrro Ft. Tory Lanez	Summer Chillout 2022
2022	"Queen St W"	Jessie Reyez	Yessie
2022	"Grrrls"	Lizzo	Special
2022	"Special"	Lizzo	Special
2022	"Everybody's Gay"	Lizzo	Special
2022	"Naked"	Lizzo	Special
2023	"Dreamliner"	Ally Salort	Non-album single
2023	"Lipstick"	Charlie Puth	Non-album single
2024	"Caught Up"	FLO	Access All Areas
2024	"Bleeding Me Dry"	Alicia Creti	Non-album single
2024	"See Through"	Amelia Moore	he's just not that into you!
2025	"Speechless"	2BYG	
2025	"IRL (FEAT. SZA)	Lizzo	MY FACE HURTS FROM SMILING
2025	"LEFT RIGHT"	Lizzo	MY FACE HURTS FROM SMILING
2025	"DITTO"	Lizzo	MY FACE HURTS FROM SMILING
2025	"CRASHOUT"	Lizzo	MY FACE HURTS FROM SMILING
2025	"GOTCHO BITCH"	Lizzo	MY FACE HURTS FROM SMILING
2025	"DROPPIN ON IT"	Lizzo	MY FACE HURTS FROM SMILING
2025	"JUST 4 FUN"	Lizzo	MY FACE HURTS FROM SMILING
2025	"CUT EM OFF"	Lizzo	MY FACE HURTS FROM SMILING
2025	"BEND IT OVA"	Lizzo	MY FACE HURTS FROM SMILING
2025	"Overwhelmed"	Alicia Creti	
2026	"No One's Business"	Alicia Creti	
2026	" I Want You"	2BYG	
2026	"Candle Wax"	Tierra Whack	
2026	"No Such Thing" (feat.clipse)	Kehlani	
2026	"Call Me Back"	Kehlani	
2026	"Real Love" (fear Honey Bxby)	Fetty Wap	

== Awards and nominations ==
=== BMI Awards ===
Year	Nominee / work	Award	Result
2017	"Here" (Alessia Cara)	Pop Song of the Year	Won

=== Grammy Awards ===
Year	Nominee / work	Award	Result
2015	"Good Kisser" (Usher)	Best R&B Song	Nominated

=== iHeartRadio Music Awards ===
Year	Nominee / work	Award	Result
2018	Pop Wansel	Producer of the Year	Nominated
