= Querer Mejor =

Single by Juanes featuring Alessia Cara

from the album Más futuro que pasado
- Language: Spanish
- English title: "Love Better"
- Released: 24 May 2019
- Length: 2:50
- Label: Universal Latino
- Songwriters: Juan Esteban Aristizábal; Alessia Caracciolo; Marco Masís; Rafael Arcaute; Ricardo Montaner; Mauricio Montaner; Camilo Echeverry
- Producers: Juanes; Tainy; Rafa Arcaute

Juanes singles chronology
"La Plata" (2019)	"Querer Mejor" (2019)

Alessia Cara singles chronology
"Out of Love" (2019)	"Querer Mejor" (2019)	"Ready" (2019)

Music video
- "Querer Mejor" on YouTube

"Querer Mejor" (transl. "Wanting Better") is a song by Colombian musician Juanes featuring Canadian singer Alessia Cara. It was released as a single by Universal Music Latino on 24 May 2019. The song was written by Juanes, Cara, Rafa Arcaute, Tainy, Mau y Ricky and Camilo. The song reached number one in Colombia, El Salvador, Nicaragua and Panama, as well as the top 10 in Costa Rica, Ecuador and Guatemala.

== Background and promotion ==
Juanes revealed the song name and release date on May 21, 2019. The song was Alessia Cara's first Spanish release.

== Reception ==
NPR's Felix Contreras called the song "classic Juanes, a slow-burning ballad that celebrates commitment and enduring love". Writing for Forbes, Jeff Benjamin stated that it "boasts the rock sound that Juanes has carried throughout his career with a thumping dembow-inspired beat backing their harmonies reflecting on a how to be better lovers". Rolling Stone's Suzy Exposito stated that "Querer Mejor" is "guided by a fluid dembow rhythm, flutters of guitar and a Hammond organ", and that the two singers "make a stunning rapport" in it. The song received nominations for a Latin Grammy Award for Record of the Year and Song of the Year in 2019.

== Music video ==
The music video for "Querer Mejor" preceded the song's digital release by one day, premiering on May 23, 2019.

== Charts ==
Chart (2019)	Peak position
Colombia (National-Report)	1
Costa Rica (Monitor Latino)	3
Ecuador (Monitor Latino)	2
El Salvador (Monitor Latino)	1
Guatemala (Monitor Latino)	4
Mexico Espanol Airplay (Billboard)	1
Nicaragua (Monitor Latino)	1
Panama (Monitor Latino)	1

== Certifications ==
Region	Certification	Certified units/sales
United States (RIAA)	Gold (Latin)	30,000^{‡}
^{‡} Sales+streaming figures based on certification alone.
