= Trust My Lonely =

Single by Alessia Cara

from the album The Pains of Growing
- Released: October 5, 2018
- Recorded: May 2017
- Genre: Electropop; R&B
- Length: 3:19
- Label: Def Jam
- Songwriters: Alessia Caracciolo; Andrew Wansel; Warren Felder
- Producer: Pop & Oak

Alessia Cara singles chronology
"Growing Pains" (2018)	"Trust My Lonely" (2018)	"Let Me Down Slowly" (2019)

Music video
- "Trust My Lonely" on YouTube

"Trust My Lonely" is a song by Canadian singer-songwriter Alessia Cara, released as the second single from her second studio album, The Pains of Growing on October 5, 2018. It was produced by Pop & Oak and lyrically concerns moving on from a relationship. The song peaked at number 55 on the Canadian Hot 100.

== Composition ==
"Trust My Lonely" is a pop track with elements of reggae featuring "plinking" synthesizers that lyrically concerns moving on from a relationship. iHeart Media wrote that the song "has lyrics that bounce between being hurt by a former partner and finding the strength to move on." Cara told Billboard that "When I initially wrote that song, I wrote it because of my insecurities. I think a lot of people, we become comfortable in our misery or comfortable in a relationship that may be bad for us. This song was just a reminder for me and for everyone to just trust yourself and let go of things don't serve you in a positive way, especially your heart and your soul."

The song was written by Alessia Cara, Warren Felder, and Andrew Wansel. Recorded in May 2017, it was one of five songs on The Pains of Growing that was produced by the duo Pop & Oak, who had previously produced Cara's breakout hit, "Here."

== Critical reception ==
Ryan Reed of Rolling Stone called the song "self-empowered" and judged it to be about Cara "crav[ing] independence". Julia Lennox of ET Canada characterized its lyrics as "empowering" and called it "groovy" with "trendy trap beats". Variety labelled it a "breakup song".

== Music video ==
A music video was released for the track featuring Cara dancing in a variety of settings, including on a beach and in a field, as well as in front of a number of colored backgrounds, which Rolling Stone deemed "playful, colorful" and "lighthearted". In the video, Cara is wearing the same oversize suit as she did in the music video for her previous single, "Growing Pains." Regarding the suit, she said during a September interview on the Today Show that "It's like an artistic way of symbolizing the idea of growing up [...] Sometimes you kind of feel like you're drowning and you feel like you're not ready for the roles life throws at you, so this was my way of symbolizing it in an artistic way."

== Charts ==
Weekly chart performance for "Trust My Lonely"
Chart (2018–19)	Peak position
Canada Hot 100 (Billboard)	55
Canada AC (Billboard)	9
Canada All-Format (Billboard)	11
Canada CHR/Top 40 (Billboard)	8
Canada Hot AC (Billboard)	9
New Zealand Hot Singles (RMNZ)	25
US Adult Pop Airplay (Billboard)	31
US Dance Airplay (Billboard)	21
US Dance Club Songs (Billboard)	6
US Pop Airplay (Billboard)	25

== Certifications and sales ==
Certifications for Trust My Lonely
Region	Certification	Certified units/sales
Brazil (Pro-Música Brasil)	Gold	20,000^{‡}
Canada (Music Canada)	Gold	40,000^{‡}
^{‡} Sales+streaming figures based on certification alone.
