= Dead Man (Alessia Cara song) =

Single by Alessia Cara

from the album Love & Hyperbole
- Released: July 19, 2024
- Length: 3:23
- Label: Def Jam
- Songwriters: Alessia Caracciolo; Mike Elizondo
- Producer: Mike Elizondo

Alessia Cara singles chronology
"Only You" (2022)	"Dead Man" (2024)	"Fire" (2025)

Music video
- "Dead Man" on YouTube

"Dead Man" is a song by Canadian singer and songwriter Alessia Cara. The track was released on July 19, 2024, as the lead single from her fourth studio album, Love & Hyperbole (2025). Cara wrote the song alongside producer Mike Elizondo.

== Background and release ==
Cara changed her layout on social media in late June 2024 and began to post cryptic teaser images on a daily basis. She formally announced the song on July 9, 2024. Through social media, Cara stated the track was about "a relationship that has come to an end and is like the last final grasp of trying to hold onto what is left of this relationship. Basically, looking at the other person and metaphorically shaking them and saying ‘I am really trying my best to hold here, but if you don’t want to be held onto then there’s nothing left of this’. I feel like I am talking to a dead man."

== Track listing ==
Digital download

1. "Dead Man" – 3:23

== Charts ==
=== Weekly charts ===
Weekly chart performance for "Dead Man"
Chart (2024)	Peak position
Canada CHR/Top 40 (Billboard)	23
Canada Hot AC (Billboard)	22

=== Yearly charts ===
Year-end chart performance for "Dead Man"
Chart (2025)	Position
Canada CHR/Top 40 (Billboard)	86
Canada Hot AC (Billboard)	75

== Release history ==
Release history and formats for "Dead Man"
Region	Date	Format	Label	Ref.
Various	July 19, 2024	Digital download; streaming	Def Jam	
Italy	July 19, 2024	Radio airplay	UMG	
