= Rooting for You (Alessia Cara song) =

Single by Alessia Cara

from the EP This Summer
- Released: August 9, 2019
- Length: 2:56
- Label: Def Jam
- Songwriter(s): Alessia Caracciolo; Jon Levine
- Producer(s): Jon Levine; Midi Jones

Alessia Cara singles chronology
"Ready" (2019)	"Rooting for You" (2019)	"Another Place" (2019)

"Rooting for You" is a song recorded by Canadian singer and songwriter Alessia Cara. It was released on August 9, 2019, as the second single from her 2019 EP This Summer. The song impacted mainstream radio on August 27, 2019.

== Background ==
On August 7, 2019, Cara began teasing the song through her social media accounts. She soon revealed that the song would be released on August 9, 2019. Cara stated that "Rooting for You," along with "October," was her favorite song from This Summer.

== Composition ==
"Rooting for You" is two minutes and fifty-six seconds long. The song's introduction is slow and consists of a guitar; the song's chorus, meanwhile, has a "synth-and-drum combo" that lasts until the end of the song. The song has been repeatedly described as "funky." The song also features a distorted saxophone.

The song's lyrics detail a failed summer romance which Cara deems "cold."

Genius Lyrics was told by Alessia Cara that this was actually inspired by the iconic clip of Tyra Banks in America’s Next Top Model where she screams: "I was rooting for you, we were all rooting for you! How Dare You!" She also said that she tried to put that in the beginning and the end of the song, but Tyra’s crew did not answer her e-mail in time to approve the sample, although some radio stations played the version with the sample in it.

== Music video ==
The music video was released in September 2019 and has surpassed 3 million views as of January 2021.

== Live performances ==
Cara performed the song live for the first time during her opening gig of Shawn Mendes' self-titled tour on August 10, 2019. The song was also performed live on The Tonight Show Starring Jimmy Fallon on October 7, 2019. She also performed the single at the 45th People's Choice Awards on November 10, 2019.

== Charts ==
Chart (2019–2020)	Peak position
Canada (Canadian Hot 100)	47
Canada AC (Billboard)	7
Canada CHR/Top 40 (Billboard)	9
Canada Hot AC (Billboard)	6
New Zealand Hot Singles (RMNZ)	31
US Pop Airplay (Billboard)	30

== Certifications ==
Certifications for Rooting for You
Region	Certification	Certified units/sales
Canada (Music Canada)	Platinum	80,000^{‡}
^{‡} Sales+streaming figures based on certification alone.

== Release history ==
Region	Date	Format	Label	Ref.
United States	August 9, 2019	Digital download; streaming	Def Jam	
United States	August 27, 2019	Contemporary hit radio	Def Jam	
