= Sweet Dream (Alessia Cara song) =

Single by Alessia Cara

from the album In the Meantime
- Released: July 15, 2021
- Length: 3:01
- Label: Def Jam
- Songwriters: Alessia Caracciolo; Jason Evigan; Caroline Ailin; Jon Levine; Spencer Stewart
- Producers: Jason Evigan; Jon Levine; Spencer Stewart

Alessia Cara singles chronology
"Welcome Back" (2020)	"Sweet Dream" (2021)	"WTSGD" (2022)

Music video
- "Sweet Dream" on YouTube

"Sweet Dream" is a song recorded by Canadian singer and songwriter Alessia Cara. The song was released on July 15, 2021, as the lead single from her third studio album In the Meantime, alongside the promotional single "Shapeshifter". Cara has stated that the song is about her struggles with insomnia.

== Background and release ==
Cara began to tease the song on June 28, 2021, before officially announcing the release on July 2, 2021.

== Critical reception ==
Louis Pavlakos of Complex named "Sweet Dream" as the twenty-seventh best Canadian song of 2021, saying "Though the track sounds uplifting and even outright happy at times, Cara just wants to sleep, something we could all use a little bit more of".

== Live performances ==
The song was performed by Cara from Niagara Falls on The Late Show with Stephen Colbert on July 19, 2021. She also performed "Shapeshifter" on the same day. "Sweet Dream" was then performed on Live with Kelly and Ryan.

== Track listing ==
- Digital download
1. "Sweet Dream" – 3:01
- Digital download – Lullaby Version
1. "Sweet Dream Lullaby" (Vocal Mix) – 3:15
2. "Sweet Dream Lullaby" (Piano Mix) – 3:32
3. "Sweet Dream Lullaby" (Instrumental) – 3:14
- Digital download – Sweet Dream - EP
1. "Sweet Dream" – 3:01
2. "Sweet Dream Lullaby" (Vocal Mix) – 3:15
3. "Sweet Dream Lullaby" (Piano Mix) – 3:32
4. "Sweet Dream Lullaby" (Instrumental) – 3:14

== Charts ==
Chart performance for "Sweet Dream"
Chart (2021)	Peak position
Canada Hot 100 (Billboard)	51
Canada AC (Billboard)	16
Canada All-Format (Billboard)	13
Canada CHR/Top 40 (Billboard)	11
Canada Hot AC (Billboard)	9
US Adult Pop Airplay (Billboard)	31
US Pop Airplay (Billboard)	35

== Certifications ==
Region	Certification	Certified units/sales
Canada (Music Canada)	Gold	40,000^{‡}
^{‡} Sales+streaming figures based on certification alone.

== Release history ==
Release history and formats for "Sweet Dream"
Region	Date	Format	Label	Ref.
Various	July 15, 2021	Digital download; streaming	Def Jam	
United States	July 20, 2021	Contemporary hit radio	Def Jam	
United States	August 9, 2021	Adult contemporary radio	Def Jam	
