= Out of Love (Alessia Cara song) =

Single by Alessia Cara

from the album The Pains of Growing
- Released: January 29, 2019
- Genre: Pop; R&B; soul
- Length: 3:47
- Label: Def Jam
- Songwriters: Alessia Caracciolo; Richard Nowels Jr.
- Producers: Rick Nowels; Dean Reid

Alessia Cara singles chronology
"Let Me Down Slowly" (2019)	"Out of Love" (2019)	"Querer Mejor" (2019)

Music video
- "Out of Love" on YouTube

"Out of Love" is a song recorded by Canadian singer-songwriter Alessia Cara. Def Jam Recordings serviced it to contemporary hit radio on January 29, 2019, as the third single from Cara's second studio album, The Pains of Growing (2018). Richard Nowels Jr. co-wrote it with Cara, and co-produced it with Dean Reid. "Out of Love" is a ballad which was inspired by a friend of Cara's who had a breakup.

The artwork for "Out of Love" was unveiled on January 23, 2019. The song's music video was released in April 2019. Cara has performed it on The Tonight Show Starring Jimmy Fallon.

== Background and reception ==
Richard Nowels Jr. co-wrote "Out of Love" with Alessia Cara, and co-produced it with Dean Reid. The song was inspired by a friend of Cara's who had a breakup. It is an "airy, slow and personally deep" song, which was created after a friend asked Cara to write a song about "somebody falling out of love with you". It was serviced to contemporary hit radio on January 29, 2019, six days after Cara unveiled its artwork.

According to Beth Bowles of Exclaim!, "Out of Love" sees the singer "demand our attention as she shows off her her vocal range, her voice smooth and rich as honey". NME's Nick Levine called the song a "big, sad ballad".

== Music video ==
The music video was released in April 2019.

== Live performances ==
Cara performed "Out of Love" on The Tonight Show Starring Jimmy Fallon on December 4, 2018.

== Credits and personnel ==
Credits are referenced from the album's liner notes.

- Alessia Cara – songwriting, lead vocals
- Rick Nowels – songwriting, production, piano, strings
- Dean Reid – production, drums, engineering
- Dylan Brady – bass guitar, percussion
- Brian Griffin – drums
- Zach Rae – keyboards, strings
- Chris Gehringer – mastering
- Manny Marroquin – mixing
- Trevor Yasuda – engineering
- Chris Rockwell – engineering
- Kieron Menzies – engineering
- Patrick Warren – strings

== Charts ==
=== Weekly charts ===
Chart (2019)	Peak position
Canada Hot 100 (Billboard)	62
Canada AC (Billboard)	9
Canada All-Format (Billboard)	28
Canada CHR/Top 40 (Billboard)	14
Canada Hot AC (Billboard)	26
Ireland (IRMA)	71
US Bubbling Under Hot 100 (Billboard)	12
US Adult Contemporary (Billboard)	20
US Adult Pop Airplay (Billboard)	38
US Pop Airplay (Billboard)	25
US Dance Airplay (Billboard)	35

=== Year-end charts ===
Chart (2019)	Position
US Adult Contemporary (Billboard)	48

== Certifications ==
Region	Certification	Certified units/sales
Brazil (Pro-Música Brasil)	Platinum	40,000^{‡}
Canada (Music Canada)	3× Platinum	240,000^{‡}
Denmark (IFPI Danmark)	Gold	45,000^{‡}
New Zealand (RMNZ)	Platinum	30,000^{‡}
Norway (IFPI Norway)	Gold	30,000^{‡}
Portugal (AFP)	Gold	5,000^{‡}
United Kingdom (BPI)	Silver	200,000^{‡}
United States (RIAA)	Gold	500,000^{‡}
^{‡} Sales+streaming figures based on certification alone.

== Release history ==
Region	Date	Format	Label	Ref
United States	January 29, 2019	Contemporary hit radio	Def Jam	
United States	May 13, 2019	Adult contemporary radio	Def Jam	
