= Ready (Alessia Cara song) =

2019 song by Alessia Cara

Single by Alessia Cara

from the EP This Summer
- Released: July 22, 2019
- Length: 2:58
- Label: Def Jam
- Songwriter(s): Alessia Caracciolo; Jon Levine
- Producer(s): Jon Levine; Midi Jones

Alessia Cara singles chronology
"Querer Mejor" (2019)	"Ready" (2019)	"Rooting for You" (2019)

"Ready" is a song recorded by Canadian singer and songwriter Alessia Cara. It was released on July 22, 2019, as the lead single from her 2019 EP This Summer.

== Background and promotion ==
On July 18, 2019, Cara took to social media to reveal the release date and cover art of the song, explaining that she "caught the writing bug out of the blue". She further stated that the release would mark the first of more songs leading up to the release of the EP. She performed the song live for the first time during her opening gig of Shawn Mendes' self-titled tour on July 23, 2019.

== Critical reception ==
Ryan Reed of Rolling Stone described the song as "a reggae-pop groove built on booming drum fills and buzzing synths". Rania Aniftos at Billboard complimented the song for being an "empowering tune about choosing not to stick around with someone who's not ready for commitment". Writing for Complex, Hannah Lifshutz found that the lyrics depict "a different kind of breakup, one that allows you to walk away feeling empowered".

== Credits and personnel ==
Credits adapted from Tidal.

- Alessia Cara – songwriting, lead vocals
- Jon Levine – songwriting, production, bass guitar, guitar, drum programming
- Midi Jones – production, bass guitar, guitar, drum programming
- Olivia Aita – background vocals
- Chris Gehringer – mastering, studio personnel
- Matty Green – mixing, studio personnel
- Darwin Derequito – engineering, studio personnel

== Charts ==
Chart (2019)	Peak position
New Zealand Hot Singles (RMNZ)	17

== Certifications and sales ==
Certifications for Ready
Region	Certification	Certified units/sales
Brazil (Pro-Música Brasil)	Gold	20,000^{‡}
Canada (Music Canada)	Gold	40,000^{‡}
^{‡} Sales+streaming figures based on certification alone.
