= Alessia Cara =

Canadian singer and songwriter (born 1996)

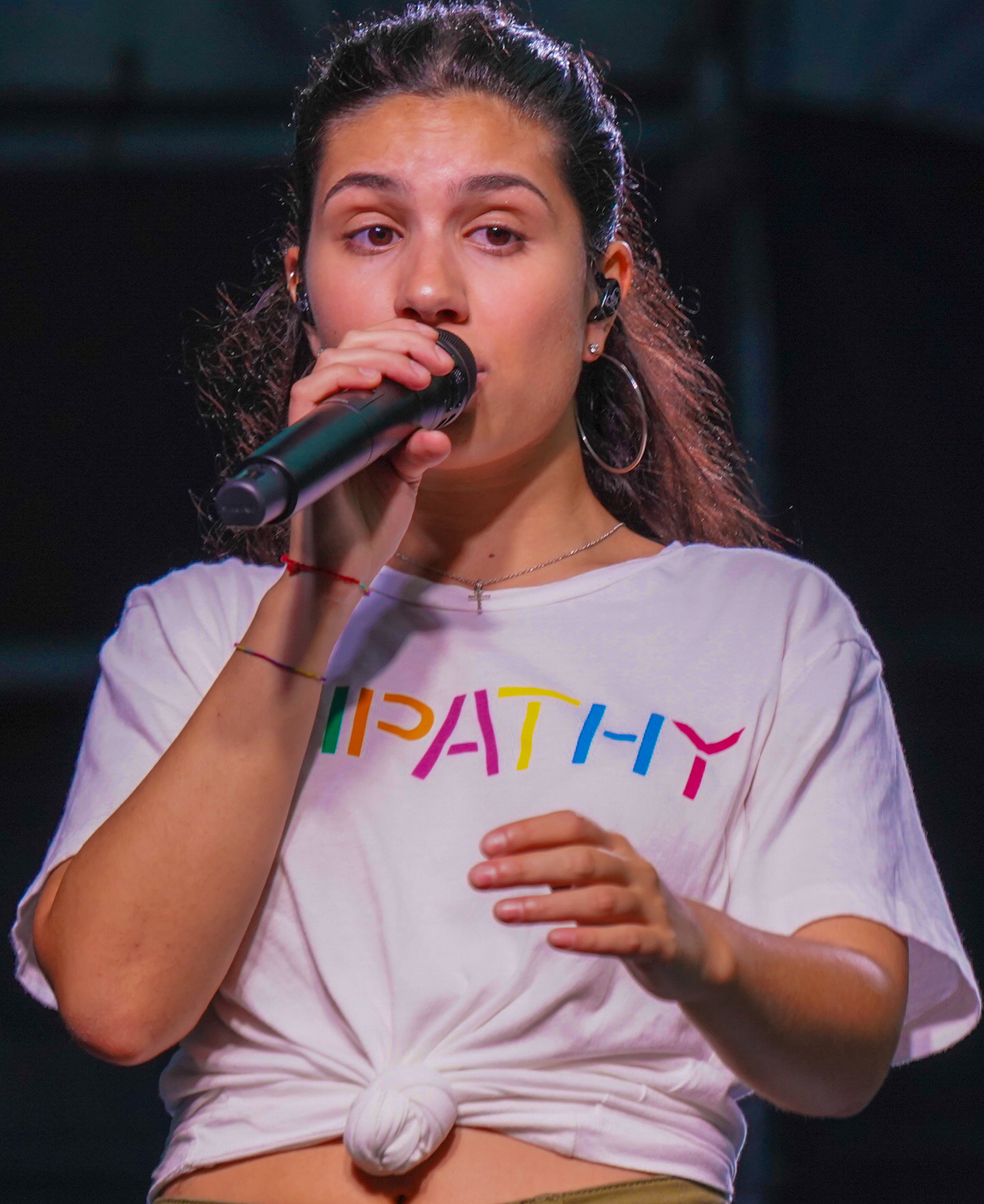
- Cara in 2018
- Born: Alessia Caracciolo; July 11, 1996 (age 30); Mississauga, Ontario, Canada
- Citizenship: Canada; Italy
- Occupations: Singer; songwriter
- Years active: 2014–present
- Musical career
- Genres: Pop; R&B
- Instruments: Vocals; guitar
- Labels: Def Jam; Universal
- Website: alessiacara.com
- Alessia Cara's voice Cara's interview on Voice of America, 19 December 2016

Alessia Caracciolo (born July 11, 1996), known professionally as Alessia Cara (/əˈlɛsiə ˈkɑːrə/ ə-LEH-see-ə KAH-rə), is a Canadian singer and songwriter. She began posting covers of songs on YouTube at age 13. After uploading acoustic covers of songs such as "Love Yourself" and "Sweater Weather" online, she signed with EP Entertainment and Def Jam Recordings in 2014 and released her debut single, "Here", the following year. It peaked at number 19 on the Canadian Hot 100 chart and was a sleeper hit in the US, peaking at number 5 on the Billboard Hot 100 chart.

Cara's debut studio album, Know-It-All (2015), peaked at number eight on the Canadian Albums Chart and at number nine on the Billboard 200. The album's third single, "Scars to Your Beautiful", peaked at number eight on the Billboard Hot 100 in 2016. In 2017, Cara collaborated with DJ and producer Zedd on the single "Stay", which is certified seven-times platinum in Canada, and featured alongside Khalid on rapper Logic's song "1-800-273-8255".

Cara has received nominations for four Grammy Awards, winning the Best New Artist in 2018, which led her to become the first Canadian artist to ever win the award. She was nominated for Song of the Year and Record of the Year at the 2019 Latin Grammys for her collaboration with Juanes on "Querer Mejor". Her second studio album, The Pains of Growing (2018), saw the moderate commercial success of the singles "Growing Pains" and "Trust My Lonely". The album won Juno Award for Album of the Year and Juno Award for Pop Album of the Year while she went on to win Juno Award for Songwriter of the Year. Her third album, In the Meantime (2021), was met with generally positive reviews from critics. Cara's fourth album, Love & Hyperbole (2025), was released on February 14, 2025, to positive reviews from critics and listeners alike.

== Early life and education ==
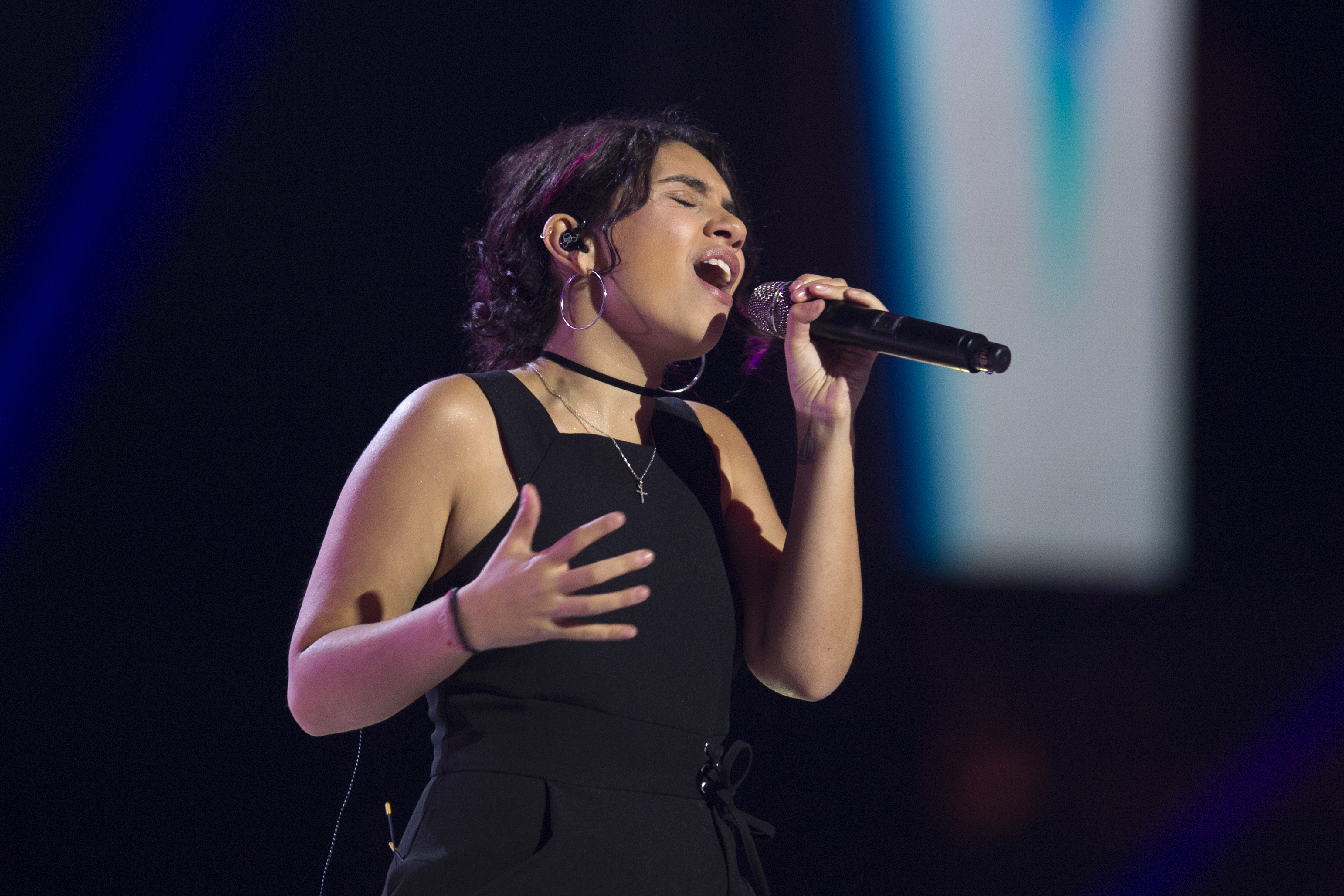
Cara performing at the 2017 Invictus Games' opening ceremony

Alessia Cara was born on July 11, 1996, in Mississauga, Ontario, and grew up in Brampton, where she attended Cardinal Ambrozic Catholic Secondary School. Her family is from Calabria, Italy; her father was born in Canada to Italian parents, and her mother is an Italian immigrant. She can speak Italian fluently. As a child, she wrote poetry and performed in theatre. She began playing guitar at the age of 10 and taught herself how to play various songs. At the age of 13, she began her own YouTube channel where she posted covers of songs that she performed. She saw Justin Bieber as a career model at the time.

== Career ==
=== 2014–2017: Career beginnings and Know-It-All ===
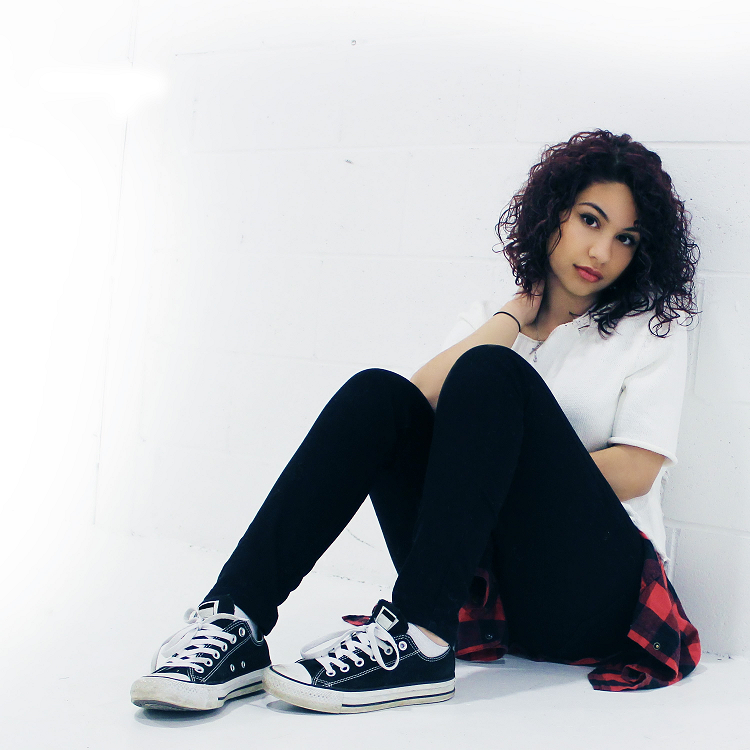
Promotional photograph of Cara from 2015

In July 2014, Cara, accompanied by her father, went to New York, where she signed a management deal with EP Entertainment, and began work on her debut studio album later that same year. She briefly took the professional name simply of Alessia before adding a clipping of her surname to become known as Alessia Cara. In April 2015, Cara released her official debut single through Def Jam. Titled "Here", it was described by MTV as "a song for everyone who secretly hates parties." Produced by Pop & Oak and Sebastian Kole, the song is about her personal experience with going to a party and being uncomfortable at it. On May 5, 2015, the song was chosen as the "can't-miss" track by Spin, as well as being listed as a "must hear song" by Cosmopolitan. The song was also named one of the best Canadian songs of April by Complex and included on Billboard's "20 Pop Songs You Need For Your Summer Playlist" in June 2015. Rolling Stone later ranked "Here" at number 21 on its year-end list of the 50 best songs of 2015. On July 29, 2015, Cara made her television debut on The Tonight Show Starring Jimmy Fallon. "Here" then received a nomination for "Original Song" at the Streamy Awards. She released the EP Four Pink Walls, containing five songs, including her debut single. Her debut album, Know-It-All, was released on November 13, 2015.

2016 US news segment on "Here"
A February 2016 Voice of America news segment on Cara's "Here"

2016 US news segment on "Wild Things"
A March 2016 Voice of America news segment on Cara and "Wild Things"

2016 US news segment on "Scars to Your Beautiful"
An August 2016 Voice of America newscast on Cara's song "Scars to Your Beautiful"

From January to April 2016, Cara embarked on her first headlining tour, the "Know-It-All Tour", performing in various US and Canadian cities. She was short-listed for the BBC Music Sound of... award for 2016 and finished as the runner-up. Cara was awarded as Breakthrough Artist of the Year at the 2016 Juno Awards. On March 7, 2016, Cara released a music video for "Wild Things". In April 2016, Cara was announced to be one of the supporting acts of British alternative rock band Coldplay in the European and North American legs of their A Head Full of Dreams Tour, alongside British singer songwriter and Grammy winner Foxes. On June 23, 2016, Cara was featured in a re-released version of the song "Wild" by Troye Sivan. The music video was released on July 22, 2016. She played Glastonbury Festival on June 24, 2016, in the John Peel tent. The music video for Cara's version of the single "How Far I'll Go", from the Disney film Moana, was released on November 3, 2016, and since then has received over 270 million views on YouTube. The song was written by Lin-Manuel Miranda, produced by Oak Felder, and the video was directed by Aya Tanimura. On December 15, 2016, Cara released a music video for "Seventeen".

Cara performed as the musical guest on Saturday Night Live on February 4, 2017. On April 18, 2017, the music video of the song "Stay" by Zedd featuring Cara was released. Cara was also featured on the song "1-800-273-8255" from Logic's Everybody album. The song was released as a single on April 28, 2017, and also features American singer-songwriter Khalid. Cara also made an appearance in the video, which was released on August 17, 2017.

=== 2018–2020: The Pains of Growing and This Summer ===
On January 28, 2018, Cara was named the Best New Artist at the 2018 Grammy Awards, making her the first Canadian artist to win this award. The decision to award her the Grammy was fervently condemned in some quarters, with Cara receiving hateful messages and death threats from angry fans of American singer SZA. As a result, Cara briefly deactivated her social media accounts.

On June 1, 2018, Cara released a teaser video following a week of cryptic Twitter posts. On June 9, she posted lyrics to a new song on her social media accounts for fans to piece together. Once completed, she announced the single's cover and name on June 11. The single, entitled "Growing Pains", was released on June 15, 2018. Its music video was released on June 20, 2018, and was nominated for Best Cinematography at the 2018 MTV VMAS.

2018 US news segment on Cara
An August 2018 Voice of America news segment on Cara's second album The Pains of Growing.

On July 10, 2018, Cara announced that she would be releasing a song she made in her basement, written and produced by her, the next day, as a small gift for her birthday. The single, titled "A Little More", was released on July 11, 2018, with the music video also released the same day. On September 29, 2018, the Canadian Football League announced that Cara would be the halftime performer at the 106th Grey Cup. In October 2018, she collaborated with Italian singer Eros Ramazzotti for the song "Vale per sempre", from the album Vita ce n'è. On October 5, 2018, Cara released another song, entitled "Trust My Lonely". A music video for the song was released the same day. On November 8, 2018, a music video for the song "Babies" by Kyle featuring Cara was released. On November 13, 2018, Cara released another song, entitled "Not Today". The release date coincided with the three-year anniversary of the release of her debut album. Cara's second studio album, The Pains of Growing, was released on November 30, 2018. It debuted at number one on the US iTunes Pop Charts, in less than two hours after its release. Despite the successful position on iTunes, the album debuted at number 71 on the Billboard 200; 62 positions lower than her debut album in 2015. "Out of Love" was eventually serviced to contemporary hit radio as the album's third single in January 2019. Cara also collaborated with Alec Benjamin on "Let Me Down Slowly", which was released on January 7, 2019. On February 21, Cara announced she would join Shawn Mendes as the opening act on his self-titled world tour for the European, United Kingdom, and United States legs. In May, she headlined The Pains of Growing Tour, visiting Canadian cities in the month of May.

Alessia Cara on Voice of America's Border Crossings (2016) (2:17)
Cara being interviewed at Jingle Ball Tour 2016 by a Voice of America reporter in December 2016

In July 2019, Cara announced the release of an EP, This Summer, with tracks to be issued "every couple of weeks" leading up to its release on September 6, 2019. She also announced that she would be adding a new leg of The Pains of Growing Tour, visiting various US cities in October and November. The first single, "Ready", was released on July 22. The second single, "Rooting for You", was released on August 9. Another song, "OKAY OKAY", was released on August 23. One more song, "October", was released on September 3. The music video for "October" was released on October 1, 2019. Cara was featured in Bastille's song "Another Place" with a music video released on November 1. The song peaked the number 18 at Billboard Hot Rock Songs. Cara released a standalone single, "Make It to Christmas", on November 8. The song charted at number 89 in Canada and number 60 in Germany.

On March 6, 2020, Cara collaborated with American singer and songwriter Lauv for the song "Canada" on Lauv's debut album, How I'm Feeling. On April 3, 2020, Cara released "I Choose", for the 2020 Netflix animated movie The Willoughbys, where she made her debut voice-role on a film for the character "Jane Willoughby". On July 17, Cara released her first live album, This Summer: Live Off The Floor, which features live, reimagined performances of the songs off of This Summer, as well as three acoustic bonus tracks and an intro that interpolates Summertime by George Gershwin. All of Cara's proceeds from the EP for the next 21 years are going to Save The Children.

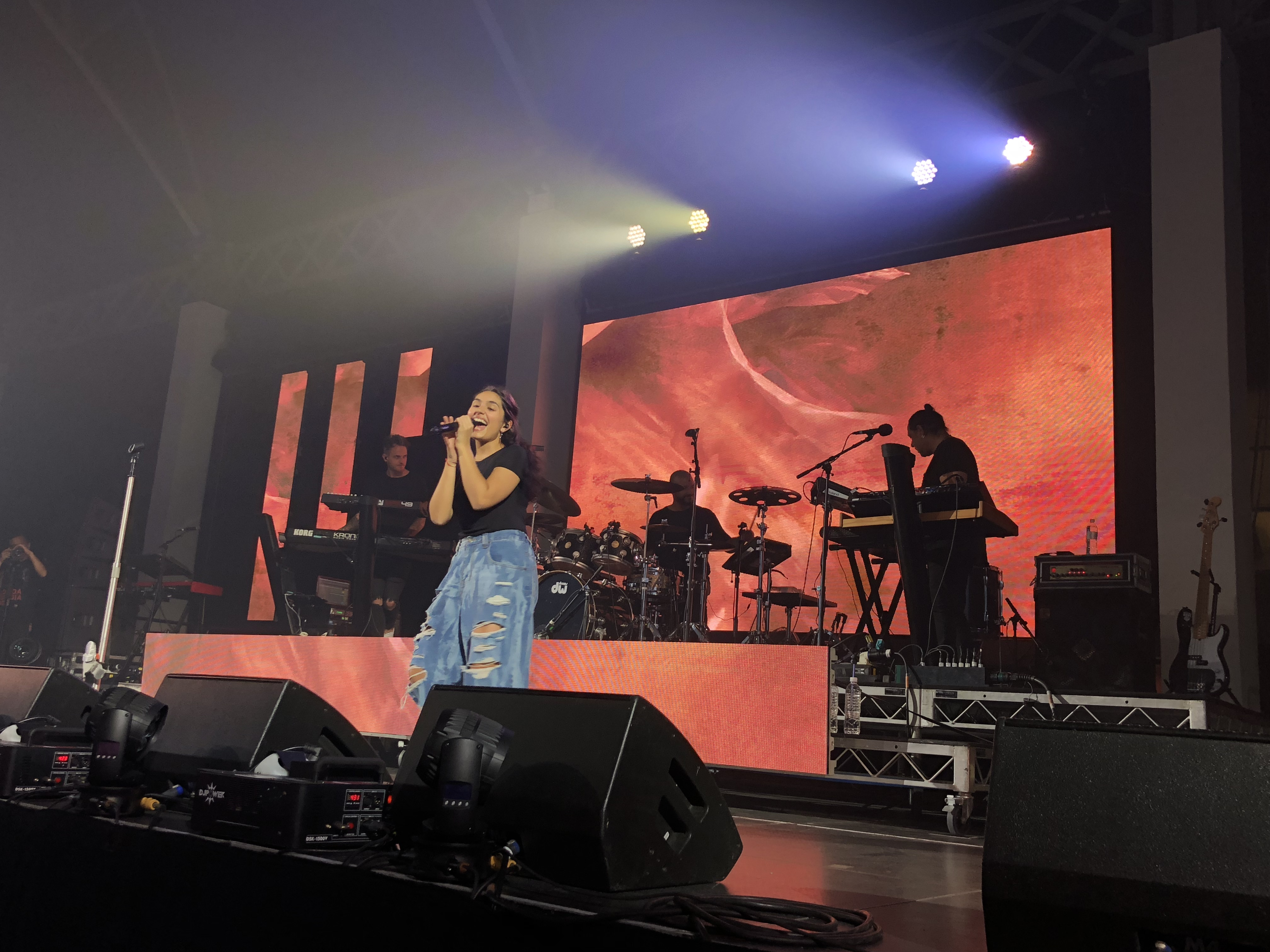
Cara performing in Sydney, Australia in 2018

=== 2021–present: In the Meantime and Love & Hyperbole ===
On July 2, 2021, Cara announced that the lead singles "Sweet Dream" and "Shapeshifter" from her third studio album would be released on July 15, 2021. The announcement of this release came after five days of cryptic posts on Instagram and Twitter, each with pictures that would turn out to be related to the music videos for the singles. The music video for "Sweet Dream" was released that same day, while the music video for "Shapeshifter" was released on July 23, 2021. A riddle to help fans decode the title of the album was sent to Cara's emailing list the day before.

On August 2, 2021, it was announced that Cara would be releasing "The Use In Trying", an original song for the 2021 animated movie PAW Patrol: The Movie, on August 10, 2021. On August 5, 2021, it was announced that Cara wrote and sang "Feel You Now", the theme song for Blade Runner: Black Lotus. Cara was later revealed to have recorded a total of four songs for the series, two of which were released through the soundtrack on November 5, 2021.

On August 31, 2021, another clue about the album was sent to Cara's emailing list, this time an image of five clocks all pointing towards 9:24. On September 2, 2021, Cara revealed the album's cover and announced that it is titled In the Meantime and would be released on September 24, 2021. On September 10, 2021, Cara collaborated with the Mexican rock band The Warning, on a cover of "Enter Sandman", which was released on the charity tribute album The Metallica Blacklist. This particular cover was famously used for the teaser trailer of the 2022 strategy role-playing video game Marvel's Midnight Suns.

On September 24, 2021, Cara's album In the Meantime was released alongside the music video for the song "Best Days". The album was met with critical acclaim from music critics, praising Cara's introspective and vulnerable lyricism. Cara starred in the 2021 edition of Yearly Departed, which was released in December 2021 on Amazon Prime Video, and performed "My Heart Will Go On" at the end of the production.

In 2023, she participated in an all-star recording of Serena Ryder's single "What I Wouldn't Do", which was released as a charity single to benefit Kids Help Phone's Feel Out Loud campaign for youth mental health.

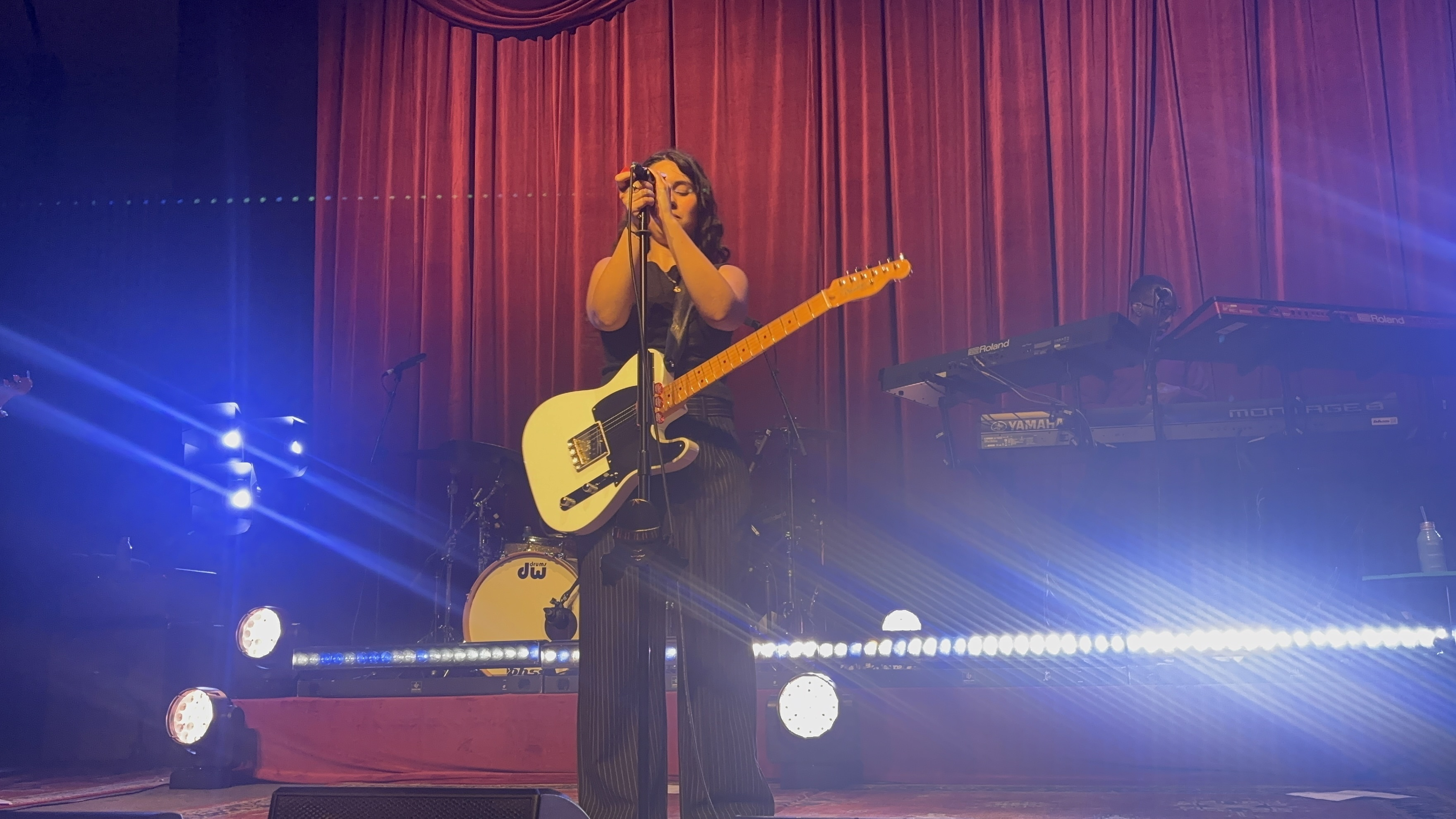
Cara performing in Sydney, Australia on the Love and Hyperbole Tour in May 2025

In August 2023, Cara confirmed on an X posting that she was working on her fourth studio album, on which work began on in late 2021, continuing into 2024. The lead single "Dead Man" from the album and the accompanying music video were released on July 19, 2024. The album, titled Love & Hyperbole, was released on February 14, 2025. The album spawned a second single, "Fire", which charted at number 30 on the US Billboard Adult Pop Airplay chart. Cara embarked on her Love & Hyperbole Tour in April 2025.

In August 2025, Cara joined the Jonas Brothers on their Greetings from Your Hometown tour as a surprise guest, to perform her single "Scars to Your Beautiful". Cara later announced that a deluxe edition of Love & Hyperbole would be released on October 24, 2025, including three previously unreleased songs, in addition to remixes featuring Julia Michaels, Lucky Daye, and Tiny Habits. The same month, Cara contributed an original song for the second season soundtrack of the Netflix series Nobody Wants This. Cara also performed the Canadian national anthem during Game 2 of the 2025 World Series on October 25, 2025.

In November 2025, Cara was announced to be among several Canadian musicians collaborating on original songs with producer Boi-1da on Perfect Perfect, a program which will produce an album themed around the 2026 FIFA World Cup. The album is set for release in summer 2026. In December 2025, Cara joined Canadian singer Bryan Adams for a performance, as part of Bryan Adams and Friends: A Great Big Holiday Jam, a television special which spawned an accompanying live album.

On January 1, 2026, Cara was inducted into the Brampton Arts Walk of Fame. In February 2026, Cara assisted in CBC's coverage of the 2026 Winter Olympics by narrating The Gold Within: Family & Fire. The same month, Cara was announced to be starring in a Super Bowl LX commercial for Pepsi, which would be broadcast across Canada. For the commercial, Cara recorded a version of "Joy of Cola". The commercial was broadcast during Super Bowl LX. In March 2026, Cara released her second live album, Love or Lack Thereof, in which she reimagined several songs from her discography as jazz and soul records. Canadian singer Nelly Furtado and American singer Norah Jones collaborated with Cara on the album. On March 29, Cara performed Furtado's "I'm Like a Bird" at the Juno Awards of 2026, during a tribute to Furtado. In May 2026, Cara was announced to perform at Toronto's FIFA World Cup opening ceremony, during which she performed "Wild Things" and "Fire". In June 2026, Cara launched Giant Desk, a parody of NPR's Tiny Desk concert series, which gained media coverage. During the performance, she debuted a new verse to "Here", her 2015 debut single.

== Personal life ==
Cara lives in Toronto, Canada. She has revealed on separate occasions that she experiences synesthesia, and also has keratosis pilaris and alopecia areata. She has also been open about her struggles with mental health and insomnia. Cara has dual Canadian and Italian citizenship.

== Artistry ==
Cara is a pop, R&B, alternative R&B, indie pop and soul singer. Her influences include Lauryn Hill, Adele, Amy Winehouse, Alanis Morissette, Alicia Keys, John Mayer, Pink, Fergie, Christina Aguilera, Carole King, Drake, Ed Sheeran, and Taylor Swift.

== Discography ==
- Know-It-All (2015)
- The Pains of Growing (2018)
- In the Meantime (2021)
- Love & Hyperbole (2025)

== Filmography ==
=== Film ===
Year	Title	Role	Notes
2020	The Willoughbys	Jane Willoughby	Voice role

=== Television ===
Year	Title	Role	Notes	Ref.
2015	Undateable	Herself	1 episode	
2017	iHeartRadio MMVA's	Co-Host	With Joe Jonas	
2021	The Other Two	Herself	1 episode	
2021	Yearly Departed	Herself	1 episode	
2022	That's My Jam	Herself/Guest	Along With Joseph Gordon-Levitt, Chance the Rapper, and Josh Groban	
2022	Blade Runner: Black Lotus	Selene (voice)	2 episodes	
2024	Canada's Drag Race: Canada vs. the World	Herself	Season 2, Episode 5: "Snatch Game: The Rusical"	
2024	Rock Paper Scissors	Lolly (voice)	2 episodes	

== Awards and nominations ==
In 2018, Cara became the first Canadian artist to ever win the Grammy Award for Best New Artist. She has also received nominations at the American Music Awards and Billboard Music Awards, and won an iHeartRadio Music Award, five Juno Awards, two MTV Video Music Awards, and an MTV Europe Music Award.
