= The Pains of Growing =

Studio album by Alessia Cara
- Released: November 30, 2018
- Recorded: 2017–2018
- Studio: 4220 (Los Angeles); Paramount Recording (Los Angeles); Revolution Recording (Toronto)
- Genre: Pop; R&B
- Length: 45:44
- Label: Def Jam
- Producer: Pop & Oak; Ricky Reed; Trevor "Trevorious" Brown; Zaire Koalo; ClickNPress; Jon Levine; No I.D.; Steve Wyreman; Rick Nowels; Dean Reid; Nate Mercureau

Alessia Cara chronology
Know-It-All (2015)	The Pains of Growing (2018)	This Summer (2019)

Singles from The Pains of Growing
- 1. "Growing Pains" Released: June 15, 2018; 2. "Trust My Lonely" Released: October 5, 2018; 3. "Out of Love" Released: January 29, 2019

The Pains of Growing is the second studio album by Canadian singer and songwriter Alessia Cara. The album was released on November 30, 2018, by Def Jam Recordings. Its songs were mostly written by Cara herself, with co-writing from producers Pop & Oak. The Pains of Growing is a "coming of age" record, inspired by three years of the singer's life that led up to its release. Primarily, the album touches themes such as anxiety, heartbreak, and loneliness, as of Cara's experiences inside the music industry. Critics named Cara and her sound as "the big-sister of pop", and praised Cara's songwriting ability. The album would eventually win a Juno Award for Album of the Year at the 2020 Juno Awards, and would also receive accolades on other categories that same year.

The album debuted at 71 on the US Billboard 200 and at number 21 in Canada. The Pains of Growing generated three singles. "Growing Pains", released as the album's lead single on June 15, 2018, charted at number 65 on the Billboard Hot 100 and at number 36 in Canada. "Trust My Lonely" and "Out of Love" were respectively released as its second and third singles. Cara promoted the album through a series of public appearances and televised live performances, and later, on May 11, 2019, began embarking on 'The Pains of Growing Tour', in Ottawa, Ontario. In addition to her own tour, Cara opened for Shawn Mendes' tour during his US, Canadian and some European dates.

== Background and release ==
According to Cara, The Pains of Growing explores "the nuance and mentality of what it's like to age out of your teen years", as she was 21 during the writing and recording of it. She added that the album is "a little bit more mature, and a little bit more cohesive. It just feels more like a full album. And then conceptually, I know I already touched on it before, but just life experiences and just a lot more transparency". Steven J. Horowitz of Billboard called the album a "more mature, radio-ready body of work". From December 2018 to January 2019, Cara uploaded videos to her YouTube channel as a part of a series called "The Making Of: The Pains of Growing", in the videos she puts together a collection of behind the scenes for her songs, giving fans a look at how the songs came together in short summaries, she has created videos for the seven songs from her album: "All We Know", "I Don't Want To", "Trust My Lonely", "Wherever I Live", "7 Days", "Not Today" and "Growing Pains".

== Promotion ==
=== Singles ===
"Growing Pains", the album's lead single, was released on June 15, 2018, and serviced to hot adult contemporary radio on June 25, 2018. The song peaked at number 36 in Canada, number 65 in the United States, and number 87 in Australia. The second single, "Trust My Lonely", was released on October 5, 2018. "Out of Love" was released to US contemporary hit radio on January 29, 2019, as the album's third single.

==== Promotional singles ====
Two promotional singles preceded the album. "A Little More" was released on July 11, and "Not Today" was released on November 13.

=== Live performances ===
Cara first performed "Growing Pains" on The Tonight Show Starring Jimmy Fallon on June 18, 2018. The singer played most of The Pains of Growing for a media gathering at a Los Angeles studio in June 2018. On July 11, Cara performed "Growing Pains" on The Late Show with Stephen Colbert. "Growing Pains" was also performed at the 2018 iHeartRadio MMVAs. "Trust My Lonely" has been performed live at the 2018 MTV Europe Music Awards and "Out of Love" was performed at The Tonight Show Starring Jimmy Fallon. Cara shared the cover art and track listing on Twitter on October 26.

== Critical reception ==
Professional ratings
Aggregate scores
Source	Rating
Metacritic	72/100
Review scores
Source	Rating
AllMusic	3.5/5 stars
Evening Standard	4/5 stars
Exclaim!	8/10
The Guardian	3/5 stars
The Line of Best Fit	7/10
NME	4/5 stars
The Observer	4/5 stars
Pitchfork	6.8/10
Rolling Stone	4/5 stars
The Sydney Morning Herald	3/5 stars

Upon its release, The Pains of Growing received generally favorable reviews from music critics. On the review aggregator site Metacritic, the album holds a score of 72/100, based on 13 reviews. Rob Sheffield, writing for Rolling Stone, awarded the album 4 out of 5 stars, commending Cara's songwriting and vocals and noting her growth from her previous record; Sheffield ends his review by commenting that "all over The Pains of Growing, she's got a style that's all her own." NME likewise gave the album 4 stars out of five and commended "Girl Next Door" as "the most revealing song" on the album, calling the album "impressive and winningly authentic."

Some critics were more mixed in their assessments of the album. Ben Beaumont-Thomas, writing for The Guardian, criticized "some production that sounds suspiciously like focus-grouping" and also deemed the lyrics a "mixed bag", but commended "7 Days" and "A Little More" as "much more affecting." He gave the album 3 stars out of 5. Pitchfork critic Jayson Greene scored the album 6.8 out of 10; he opined that "a few songs here feel like homework assignments done en route to arrive at a better song." However, he also wrote that, unlike its predecessor, the album "has the tinge of a project made with love and devotion" and singled out "Not Today", "Trust My Lonely", "Nintendo Game", "Wherever I Live", and "Girl Next Door" as highlights. In the review for AllMusic, Andy Kellman compared the album to Cara's previous release, stating that "The Pains of Growing is consequently more fragmented and less consistent than Know-It-All, but Cara makes the best of it, generally writing in a slightly wiser and sharper manner from the same introverted homebody perspective."

== Commercial performance ==
In Canada, The Pains of Growing debuted at number 21 In the United States the album debuted at number 71 on the Billboard 200. Elsewhere, it charted at number 165 on the Belgium Ultratop Flanders chart, number 76 in Australia and number 78 on the Dutch Albums Chart.

== Track listing ==
No.	Title	Writer(s)	Producer(s)	Length
1.	"Growing Pains"	Alessia Caracciolo; Andrew "Pop" Wansel; Warren "Oak" Felder	Pop & Oak	3:13
2.	"Not Today"	Caracciolo	Jon Levine	2:36
3.	"I Don't Want To"	Caracciolo	Alessia Cara	2:42
4.	"7 Days"	Caracciolo; Wansel; Felder	Pop & Oak	3:28
5.	"Trust My Lonely"	Caracciolo; Wansel; Felder	Pop & Oak	3:19
6.	"Wherever I Live"	Caracciolo	Ricky Reed	3:05
7.	"All We Know"	Caracciolo; Wansel; Felder; Trevor Brown; William Simmons	Pop & Oak; Trevorious^{[a]}; Zaire Koalo^{[a]}	3:23
8.	"A Little More"	Caracciolo	Cara	2:26
9.	"Comfortable"	Caracciolo; Ernest Wilson; Steve Wyreman; Nathaniel Mercureau	No I.D.; Steve Wyreman	4:17
10.	"Nintendo Game"	Caracciolo; Kaleb Rollins; Marc Soto	ClickNPress	2:41
11.	"Out of Love"	Caracciolo; Richard Nowels Jr.	Rick Nowels; Dean Reid	3:47
12.	"Girl Next Door"	Caracciolo; Rollins; Soto	ClickNPress	3:22
13.	"My Kind"	Caracciolo; Mercureau	Reed; Nate Mercereau	3:01
14.	"Easier Said"	Caracciolo; Wansel; Felder; Brown; Simmons	Pop & Oak; Trevorious^{[a]}; Zaire Koalo^{[a]}	3:25
15.	"Growing Pains (Reprise)"	Caracciolo	Cara	0:59
Total length:				45:44

Target exclusive bonus tracks & Japanese bonus tracks
No.	Title	Length
16.	"Growing Pains" (Acoustic)	3:14
17.	"Growing Pains" (BRAVVO Remix)	3:43
18.	"Growing Pains" (Locals Only Sound Remix) (featuring Curtis Smith)	3:14
19.	"Trust My Lonely" (Frank Walker Remix)	3:06
20.	"Trust My Lonely" (Rain or Shine Remix)	4:35

Japanese bonus track
No.	Title	Writer(s)	Producer(s)	Length
21.	"Stay" (with Zedd)	Caracciolo; Anton Zaslavski; Anders Frøen; Sarah Aarons; Jonnali Parmenius; Linus Wiklund	Zedd; Wiklund	3:30
Total length:				67:20

Track listing adapted from iTunes.

== Personnel ==
Credits for The Pains of Growing adapted from AllMusic. All lyrics written by Alessia Cara.

Studios

Recording locations

- 4220 Studios (Los Angeles) – recording (track 9)
- Paramount Recording Studios (Los Angeles) – recording (tracks 10, 12)
- Revolution Recording (Toronto, ON) – recording (tracks 10, 12)

Additional recording locations

- The Bridge Miloco Studios (London) – guitars (track 16)

Engineering locations

- SuCasa Recording (Los Angeles) – engineering (tracks 1, 4, 5, 7, 14, 17, 18, 19, 20)
- Cherry Beach Sound (Toronto) – engineering (track 2)
- The Synagogue (Los Angeles) – engineering (track 2)
- Alessia's Basement Studios (Brampton, ON) – engineering (tracks 3, 8, 15)
- Harbourfront Studios (Toronto) – engineering (tracks 4, 5, 7, 14, 19, 20)
- Elysian Park (Los Angeles) – engineering (tracks 6, 13)
- The Green Building Studio (Santa Monica) – engineering (track 11)
- Panoram Studios (Mexico City) – vocals engineering (track 16)

Mixing and mastering locations

- Larrabee Sound Studios (North Hollywood) – mixing (tracks 1, 4, 5, 6, 7, 10, 11, 12, 13, 14, 17, 18, 19, 20)
- Studio 55 (Los Angeles) – mixing (track 2)
- United Recording Studio (Los Angeles) – mixing (tracks 8, 15)
- Miami Mastering Studios – mastering (track 16)
- Sterling Sound – mastering

Vocals

- Alessia Cara – primary artist, vocals (all tracks)
- Pop & Oak – additional vocals (tracks 5, 19, 20)

Instrumentation

- Alessia Cara – instrumentation (tracks 3, 6, 8, 13, 15)
- Pop & Oak – instrumentation (tracks 4, 5, 7, 14, 19, 20), keyboards (tracks 4, 5, 7, 14, 19, 20)
- Downtown Trevor Brown – instrumentation (tracks 7, 14), guitars (tracks 7, 14), drums (track 14)
- Zaire Koalo – instrumentation (tracks 7, 14), drum programming (tracks 7, 14)
- Ricky Reed – instrumentation (tracks 6, 13)
- Jon Sosin – guitar (track 2)
- Bianca McC – violin (track 2)
- Jon Levine – keyboard, bass and drum programming (track 2)
- Steve Wyreman – piano, Hammond B3, bass, guitar (track 9)
- Nate Mercereau – guitar, french horn, trumpet (track 9)
- Stephen Feigenbaum – string arrangement (track 9)
- Brandyn Porter – acoustic guitar (tracks 10, 12)
- Rick Nowels – piano, pizzicato strings (track 11)
- Brian Griffin – live drums (track 11)
- Dean Reid – drum programming, live drums (track 11)
- Dylan Brady – bass, percussion, effects (track 11)
- Zac Rae – keyboards, strings, bass (track 11)
- Patrick Warren – strings (track 11)
- Eric Ruscinski – guitar, guitar arrangement (track 16)

Production

- Alessia Cara – executive production, production (tracks 3, 8, 15, 16)
- Tony Perez – executive production
- Robert Elazer – executive production
- Pop & Oak – production (tracks 1, 4, 5, 7, 14, 17, 18, 19, 20)
- Jon Levine – production (track 2)
- Ricky Reed – production (tracks 6, 13)
- Downtown Trevor Brown – co-production (tracks 7, 14)
- Zaire Koalo – co-production (tracks 7, 14)
- No I.D. – production (track 9)
- Steve Wyreman – production (track 9)
- ClickNPress – production (tracks 10, 12)
- Rick Nowels – production (track 11)
- Nate Mercereau – production (track 13)
- Frank Walker – additional production (track 19)
- Rain on Shine – additional production (track 20)
- Zedd – production (track 21)
- Linus Wiklund – production (track 21)

Technical

- Oak Felder – programming (tracks 1, 17, 18), engineering(tracks 1, 4, 5, 7, 14, 17, 18, 19, 20)
- Pop & Oak – programming (tracks 4, 5, 7, 14, 19, 20 )
- Inaam Haq – engineering (track 2)
- Downtown Trevor Brown – programming (tracks 7, 14)
- Zaire Koalo – programming (tracks 7, 14)
- Alessia Cara – engineering (tracks 3, 8, 15)
- Ethan Shumaker – engineering (tracks 6, 13)
- Keith Sorrels – engineering (track 7), engineering assistance (tracks 1, 4, 5, 7, 14, 17, 18, 19, 20)
- Kieron Menzies – engineering (track 11)
- Trevor Yasuda – engineering (track 11)
- Chris Rockwell – engineering (track 11)
- Dean Reid – engineering (track 11)
- Ryan Reault – recording engineering assistance (track 9)
- Casey Cuayo – recording engineering assistance (track 9)
- Juan Sebastian Rodriguez – vocals engineering (track 16)
- Gabriel Leal – recording engineering assistance (track 16)
- Manny Marroquin – mixing (tracks 1, 4, 5, 6, 7, 10, 11, 12, 13, 14, 17, 18, 19, 20)
- Matt Green – mixing (track 2)
- George Seara – mixing (track 3)
- Jimmy Douglass – mixing (tracks 8, 15)
- Javier Garza – mixing (track 16)
- Chris Gehringer – mastering (all tracks)
- Jim Caruana – recording (track 9)
- Matt Anthony – recording (tracks 10, 12)
- Stephen Koszler – recording (tracks 10, 12)
- Simon Todkill – guitar recording (track 16)
- Antonio Baglio – mastering (track 16)
- Chris Gehringer – mastering

Artwork & management

- superduperbrick – cover art & photography
- James McCloud – direction of photography
- Ashley Pawlak – package design
- Andy Proctor – package production
- Tab Nkhereanye – A&R
- Korinne Perez – A&R for EP Entertainment
- Liza Corsey – A&R administration
- Leesa D. Brunson – A&R operations
- Brittany Mansfield – A&R coordination
- Chris Smith – management
- Theo Sedlmayr – legal representation
- Aaron Rosenberg – EP legal representation
- Odell Nails – business affairs
- Ian Allen – business affairs
- Antoinette Trotman – business affairs
- Jamie Sudhalter – business affairs
- Vol S. Davis III – business affairs

== Charts ==
Chart (2018)	Peak position
Australian Albums (ARIA)	76
Belgian Albums (Ultratop Flanders)	165
Canadian Albums (Billboard)	21
Dutch Albums (Album Top 100)	78
US Billboard 200	71

== Certifications ==
Region	Certification	Certified units/sales
Canada (Music Canada)	Gold	40,000^{‡}
^{‡} Sales+streaming figures based on certification alone.

== Release history ==
Region	Date	Format	Label	Ref.
Australia	November 30, 2018	CD; digital download; LP	Def Jam	
Netherlands	November 30, 2018	CD; digital download; LP	Def Jam	
US	November 30, 2018	CD; digital download; LP	Def Jam	
Japan	November 30, 2018	CD	Universal Music Japan	
