= Growing Pains (Alessia Cara song) =

2018 song by Canadian singer-songwriter

Single by Alessia Cara

from the album The Pains of Growing
- Released: June 15, 2018
- Recorded: 2017
- Genre: Pop
- Length: 3:13
- Label: Def Jam
- Songwriters: Alessia Caracciolo; Andrew Wansel; Warren Felder
- Producer: Pop & Oak

Alessia Cara singles chronology
"1-800-273-8255" (2017)	"Growing Pains" (2018)	"Trust My Lonely" (2018)

Music video
- "Growing Pains" on YouTube

"Growing Pains" is a song written and recorded by the Canadian singer-songwriter Alessia Cara, released as the lead single for her second studio album, The Pains of Growing (2018). Written by Cara and producers Pop & Oak, the track explores the challenges of entering adulthood. It was released to digital retailers on June 15, 2018 through Def Jam Recordings and serviced to American hot adult contemporary radio on June 25, 2018. Its official music video received a nomination for Best Cinematography at the 2018 MTV Video Music Awards.

== Composition ==
"Growing Pains" is a pop song with influences of R&B. Lyrically, the song discusses a loss of innocence and the "inevitable struggle of growing up."

== Music video ==
An accompanying music video directed by Alan Masferrer premiered June 20, 2018. It is set in a dystopian environment meant to represent the oppression of others' influences. Cara begins the video in an oversized shirt before being pushed around by suit- and mask-wearing adult figures and being forced into an oversized grey suit herself. Lilly Milman of Billboard wrote that the video finds Cara "navigating an obstacle course of adulthood."

== Live performances ==
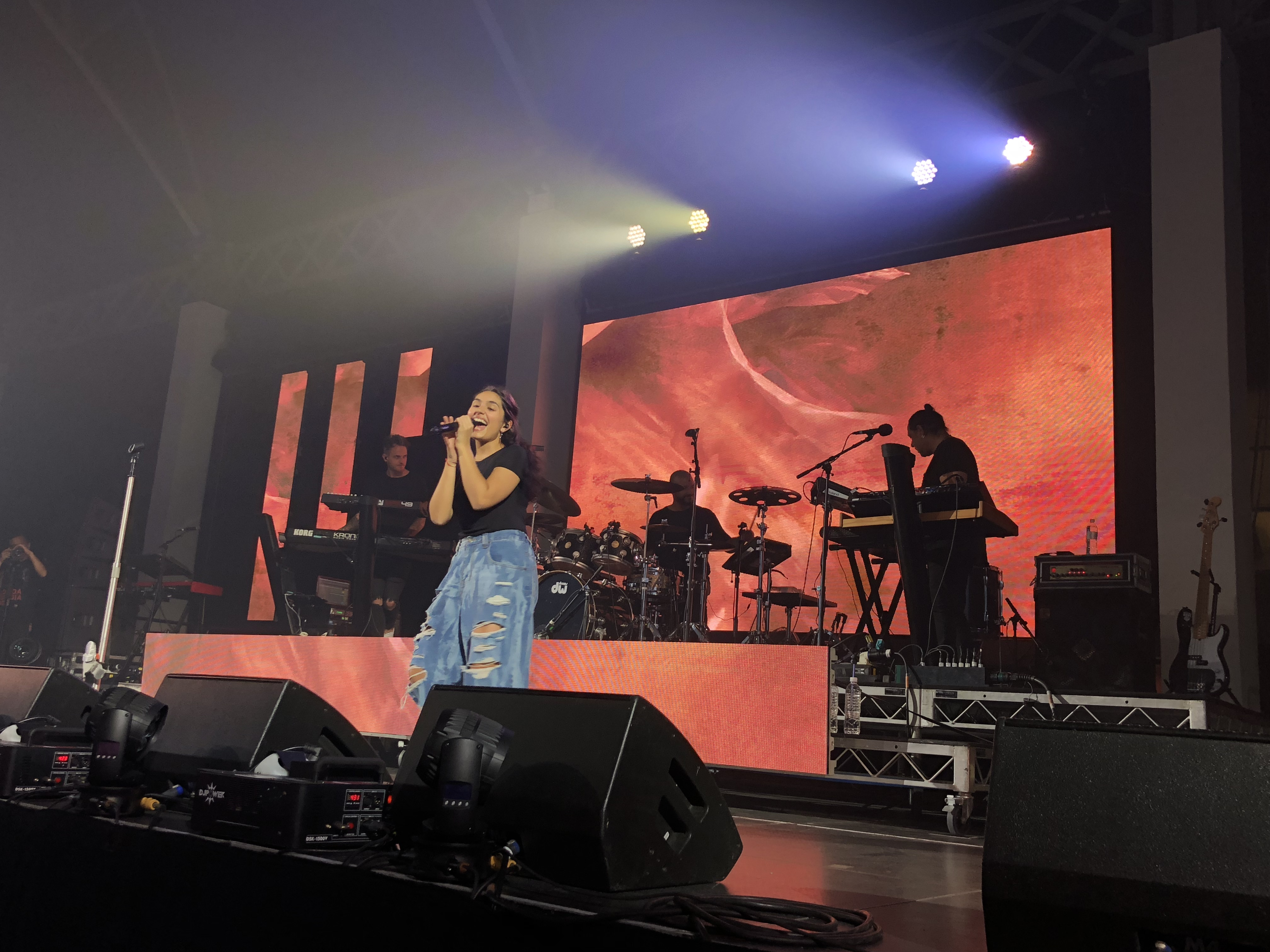
Cara performing the song at an invite-only gig in Sydney, Australia in 2018.

Cara debuted the song on The Tonight Show Starring Jimmy Fallon on June 18, 2018.

== Track listing ==
- Digital download
1. "Growing Pains" – 3:13
- Digital download – Acoustic
1. "Growing Pains" (Acoustic) – 3:13
- Digital download – Remixes
1. "Growing Pains" (Eden Prince Remix) – 3:33
2. "Growing Pains" (Toby Green Remix) – 2:55
3. "Growing Pains" (Alphalove Remix) – 3:32
4. "Growing Pains" (Dombresky Remix) – 3:27
5. "Growing Pains" (Justin Caruso Remix) – 3:01
6. "Growing Pains" (Ford Miskin Remix) – 2:36
- Digital download – Remixes, Pt. 2
1. "Growing Pains" (Bravvo Remix) – 3:42
2. "Growing Pains" (The Kemist Remix) – 3:36
3. "Growing Pains" (Locals Only Sound Remix) (featuring Curtis Smith) – 3:15

== Charts ==
Chart (2018)	Peak position
Australia (ARIA)	87
Canada Hot 100 (Billboard)	36
Canada AC (Billboard)	10
Canada CHR/Top 40 (Billboard)	9
Canada Hot AC (Billboard)	5
Mexico Ingles Airplay (Billboard)	50
New Zealand Heatseekers (RMNZ)	5
US Billboard Hot 100	65
US Adult Pop Airplay (Billboard)	16
US Dance Airplay (Billboard)	24
US Dance Club Songs (Billboard)	7
US Pop Airplay (Billboard)	15

== Certifications ==
Region	Certification	Certified units/sales
Brazil (Pro-Música Brasil)	Gold	20,000^{‡}
Canada (Music Canada)	Platinum	80,000^{‡}
United States (RIAA)	Gold	500,000^{‡}
^{‡} Sales+streaming figures based on certification alone.

== Release history ==
List of release dates, showing region, format(s), label(s) and reference(s)
Country	Date	Format	Version	Label	Ref.
Various	June 15, 2018	Digital download	Original	Def Jam	
Italy	June 22, 2018	Radio airplay	Original	UMG	
United States	June 25, 2018	Hot adult contemporary	Original	Def Jam; UMG	
United Kingdom	August 3, 2018	Digital download	Remixes EP	Def Jam; UMG	
United Kingdom	August 24, 2018	Digital download	Remixes, Pt. 2 EP	Def Jam; UMG	
United Kingdom	August 31, 2018	Digital download	Acoustic	Def Jam; UMG	
