= Elle Varner discography =

- Studio albums: 2
- Singles: 7
- Music videos: 3
- Mixtapes: 1

The discography of Elle Varner, an American singer-songwriter, consists of two studio albums, one mixtape, seven singles, two promotional singles and two music videos.

In January 2012, Elle Varner released her first project Conversational Lush. Varner's debut single "Only Wanna Give It to You" was released on August 6, 2011. The song, which serves as the lead single from her debut studio album Perfectly Imperfect, features American rapper J. Cole. The song peaked at No. 20 on the US Billboard R&B/Hip-Hop Songs chart. In October 2011, she was listed as one of TheBoomBox's '15 Artists to Watch' and was one of the artists featured in BET's Music Matters campaign. On October 7, 2011, RCA Music Group announced it was disbanding J Records along with Arista Records and Jive Records. With the shutdown, Varner (and all other artists previously signed to these three labels) released her debut album on RCA Records. The second single from Varner's debut album "Refill" was released to iTunes January 31, 2012, and debuted at No. 78 on the US Billboard R&B/Hip-Hop Songs chart. Her debut studio album, Perfectly Imperfect, was released on August 7, 2012. Her second album, Ellevation, was released on July 12, 2019.

== Albums ==
=== Studio albums ===
List of albums, with selected chart positions
Title	Album details	Peak chart positions			Sales
Title	Album details	US	US R&B /HH	US R&B	Sales
Perfectly Imperfect	Released: August 7, 2012; Label: RCA; Formats: CD, digital download	4	2	14	US: 151,730
Ellevation	Released: July 12, 2019; Label: eOne; Formats: CD, digital download	—	—	—	
"—" denotes a recording that did not chart or was not released in that territory.

=== Mixtapes ===
List of mixtapes
Title	Album details
Conversational Lush	Released: January 23, 2012; Label: Self-released; Formats: Digital download

== Singles ==
=== As lead artist ===
List of singles as lead artist, with selected chart positions, showing year released and album name
Title	Year	Peak chart positions					Album
Title	Year	US Bub.	US R&B /HH	US R&B /HH Airplay	US Adult R&B	JAP	Album
"Only Wanna Give It to You" (featuring J. Cole)	2011	—	20	20	26	23	Perfectly Imperfect
"Refill"	2012	1	10	10	12	—	Perfectly Imperfect
"I Don't Care"	2012	—	53	42	33	—	Perfectly Imperfect
"Oh What a Night"	2012	—	—	—	—	—	Perfectly Imperfect
"Don't Wanna Dance" (featuring A$AP Ferg)	2014	—	—	—	25	—	4 Letter Word
"F**k It All"	2014	—	—	—	—	—	4 Letter Word
"Birthday" (featuring 50 Cent)	2015	—	—	—	—	—	4 Letter Word
"Loving U Blind"	2018	—	—	—	—	—	Ellevation
"Pour Me" (featuring Wale)	2019	—	—	—	—	—	Ellevation
"—" denotes a title that did not chart, was not released in that territory, or did not receive certification.

=== Promotional singles ===
List of promotional singles, with selected chart positions, showing year released and album name
Title	Year	Peak chart positions	Sales	Album
Title	Year	KOR Intl.	Sales	Album
"So Fly"	2012	13	KOR: 31,751	Perfectly Imperfect
"Rover"	2014	—		Non-album singles

== Guest appearances ==
List of guest appearances, with other performing artists, showing year released and album name
Title	Year	Album	Artist(s)
"Luv Me Tomorrow"	2012	Black Hero Theme Musik	Omen, Karina Pasian, Amanda Seales, Apple Juice Kid
"No Miracles"	2014	My Own Lane	Kid Ink, MGK
"Wonderful Everyday (Arthur Theme)"	2014		Chance the Rapper, Jessie Ware, Francis and the Lights, Eryn Allen Kane, The O'Mys, Wyclef Jean
"Run Up On Ya"	2015	B4.Da.$$	Joey Bada$$, Action Bronson
"Do It to Em"	2015	Blue Dream & Lean 2	Juicy J
"All You Need"	2015	Lucky 7	Statik Selektah, Ab-Soul, Action Bronson
"Doors"	2015	GO:OD AM	Mac Miller
"Brand Name"	2015	GO:OD AM	Mac Miller
"100 Grandkids"	2015	GO:OD AM	Mac Miller
"One of Those Nights"	2015	Everyday Is Valentine's Day	Da Internz
"D.R.A.M. Sings Special"	2016	Coloring Book	DRAM
"Beg"	2018	Genesis EP	Leon Thomas III
"Michelle"	2019	Eve	Rapsody
"Why Do I Stay High"	2022	Stoner's Night	Juicy J & Wiz Khalifa

== Songwriting credits ==
Title	Year	Co-writers	Artist	Album
"Use Me"	2012	Miguel; OAK; Andrew Wansel; Steve Mostyn; Ronnie James; Nycole Russell	Miguel	Kaleidoscope Dream
"Personal"	2014	Jenna Andrews; William Wiik Larsen	Jessie J	Sweet Talker
"ROS"	2015	Malcolm McCormick; Dacoury Natche; Adam Feeney; Thomas Paxton-Beesley	Mac Miller	GO:OD AM
"Church"	2022	Jenna Andrews; Bekuh Boom; Floyd Hills; William Larsen; Moses Sumney	Jennifer Lopez	Marry Me Soundtrack
