= Billboard Year-End Hot R&B/Hip-Hop Songs of 2011 =

American music chart

This is a list of Billboard magazine's Top Hot R&B/Hip-Hop Songs of 2011.

The chart features only 99 songs as the number-82 song was erroneously omitted.

No.	Title	Artist(s)
1	"Sure Thing"	Miguel
2	"Motivation"	Kelly Rowland featuring Lil Wayne
3	"Look at Me Now"	Chris Brown featuring Lil Wayne and Busta Rhymes
4	"I'm on One"	DJ Khaled featuring Drake, Rick Ross and Lil Wayne
5	"Far Away"	Marsha Ambrosius
6	"No Hands"	Waka Flocka Flame featuring Roscoe Dash and Wale
7	"My Last"	Big Sean featuring Chris Brown
8	"Can't Be Friends"	Trey Songz
9	"Moment 4 Life"	Nicki Minaj featuring Drake
10	"She Ain't You"	Chris Brown
11	"Aston Martin Music"	Rick Ross featuring Drake and Chrisette Michele
12	"All of the Lights"	Kanye West
13	"6 Foot 7 Foot"	Lil Wayne featuring Cory Gunz
14	"Love Faces"	Trey Songz
15	"How to Love"	Lil Wayne
16	"Fall for Your Type"	Jamie Foxx featuring Drake
17	"No BS"	Chris Brown
18	"What's My Name"	Rihanna
19	"Pretty Girl Rock"	Keri Hilson
20	"Down on Me"	Jeremih featuring 50 Cent
21	"I Smile"	Kirk Franklin
22	"Make a Movie"	Twista featuring Chris Brown
23	"So in Love"	Jill Scott
24	"Love Letter"	R. Kelly
25	"Best Thing I Never Had"	Beyoncé
26	"Quickie"	Miguel
27	"Marvin & Chardonnay"	Big Sean featuring Kanye West and Roscoe Dash
28	"Did It On'em"	Nicki Minaj
29	"You Are"	Charlie Wilson
30	"Hustle Hard"	Ace Hood
31	"Unusual"	Trey Songz featuring Drake
32	"Otis"	Jay-Z and Kanye West featuring Otis Redding
33	"Headlines"	Drake
34	"She Will"	Lil Wayne featuring Drake
35	"That Way"	Wale featuring Rick Ross and Jeremih
36	"Walking"	Mary Mary
37	"You Be Killin Em"	Fabolous
38	"Lay It Down"	Lloyd
39	"Out of My Head"	Lupe Fiasco featuring Trey Songz
40	"Marvins Room"	Drake
41	"Black and Yellow"	Wiz Khalifa
42	"Super Bass"	Nicki Minaj
43	"Racks"	YC featuring Future
44	"Deuces"	Chris Brown featuring Tyga and Kevin McCall
45	"I'm Doin' Me"	Fantasia
46	"Niggas in Paris"	Jay-Z and Kanye West
47	"Man Down"	Rihanna
48	"Roll Up"	Wiz Khalifa
49	"Wet the Bed"	Chris Brown featuring Ludacris
50	"Share My Life"	Kem
51	"Right Thru Me"	Nicki Minaj
52	"Bring It Back"	Travis Porter
53	"Not My Daddy"	Kelly Price featuring Stokley
54	"Where You At"	Jennifer Hudson
55	"Got Your Back"	Anthony David featuring Algebra
56	"If It's Love"	Kem featuring Chrisette Michele
57	"Lay with You"	El Debarge featuring Faith Evans
58	"Pieces of Me"	Ledisi
59	"Grove St. Party"	Waka Flocka Flame featuring Kebo Gotti
60	"Party"	Beyoncé featuring André 3000
61	"One in a Million"	Ne-Yo
62	"Mrs. Right"	Mindless Behavior featuring Diggy Simmons
63	"Body 2 Body"	Ace Hood featuring Chris Brown
64	"John"	Lil Wayne featuring Rick Ross
65	"Best Night of My Life"	Jamie Foxx featuring Wiz Khalifa
66	"Cupid"	Lloyd featuring Awesome Jones
67	"10 Seconds"	Jazmine Sullivan
68	"There Goes My Baby"	Usher
69	"Life of the Party"	Charlie Wilson
70	"Right Above It"	Lil Wayne featuring Drake
71	"Yes"	Musiq Soulchild
72	"Make It Rain"	Travis Porter
73	"Bottoms Up"	Trey Songz featuring Nicki Minaj
74	"No One Gonna Love You"	Jennifer Hudson
75	"When a Woman Loves"	R. Kelly
76	"Whip My Hair"	Willow
77	"All I Want Is You"	Miguel featuring J. Cole
78	"Oh My"	DJ Drama featuring Fabolous, Roscoe Dash and Wiz Khalifa
79	"Fool for You"	CeeLo Green featuring Melanie Fiona or Philip Bailey
80	"Ballin'"	Young Jeezy featuring Lil Wayne
81	"Radio Message"	R. Kelly
83	"Words"	Bobby Valentino
84	"Novacane"	Frank Ocean
85	"Work Out"	J. Cole
86	"Take Me Away"	Keyshia Cole
87	"One Night Stand"	Keri Hilson featuring Chris Brown
88	"On My Level"	Wiz Khalifa featuring Too Short
89	"Sometimes I Cry"	Eric Benét
90	"Your Love"	Diddy – Dirty Money featuring Trey Songz
91	"Emergency"	Tank
92	"Love All Over Me"	Monica
93	"I Don't Deserve You"	Lloyd Banks featuring Jeremih
94	"Welcome to My Hood"	DJ Khaled featuring Rick Ross, Plies, Lil Wayne and T-Pain
95	"Anything"	Musiq Soulchild
96	"H.A.M."	Jay-Z and Kanye West
97	"Fire Flame"	Birdman featuring Lil Wayne
98	"Loving You No More"	Diddy – Dirty Money featuring Drake
99	"Someone to Love Me (Naked)"	Mary J. Blige featuring Diddy and Lil Wayne
100	"Champagne Life"	Ne-Yo

== See also ==
- 2011 in music
- Billboard Year-End Hot 100 singles of 2011
- Billboard Year-End Hot Rap Songs of 2011
- List of number-one R&B singles of 2011 (U.S.)
