= Oak Felder =

Turkish songwriter and record producer (born 1980)

Warren "Oak" Felder
- Also known as: Oakwud
- Born: Warren Felder III; November 9, 1980 (age 45); Istanbul, Turkey
- Origin: Atlanta, Georgia, U.S.
- Genres: R&B; pop; hip hop
- Occupations: Songwriter; record producer
- Years active: 2005–present
- Member of: Pop & Oak

Warren "Oak" Felder (born November 9, 1980) is a American-Turkish songwriter and record producer based in Atlanta and Los Angeles. He is known for his work as part of the production duo Pop & Oak, and was nominated for a Grammy Award in 2015.

== Early life ==
Felder was born and raised in Istanbul, Turkey, to an African-American father and a Turkish mother. After studying network technologies and artificial intelligence at Istanbul Technical University in Istanbul, he moved to the United States in 2001 to attend Georgia Tech in Atlanta. His nickname comes from his Turkish name, Okay.

== Career ==
While a student at Georgia Tech, Felder recorded a demo with the singer/songwriter Sterling Simms, which led to a meeting with L.A. Reid and resulted in Felder writing and producing a track on a Mariah Carey album in 2005.

Around 2009, Felder became production partners with Pop Wansel as the production duo Pop & Oak. Their first big hit was "Your Love", the lead single on Nicki Minaj's 2010 debut studio album Pink Friday. Other notable songs they have written and produced include six tracks on Elle Varner's 2012 album Perfectly Imperfect (two of the singles are "Only Wanna Give It to You" and "I Don't Care"), nine songs on Kehlani's debut album SweetSexySavage, and six tracks on Alessia Cara's 2015 debut album Know-It-All, including the singles "Here" and "Scars to Your Beautiful", which both went to number 1 on the Billboard Mainstream Top 40 charts.

Felder was nominated for a 2015 Grammy Award for Best R&B Song for writing Usher's single "Good Kisser"; produced two songs on the Alicia Keys album Girl on Fire, which won the 2014 Grammy Award for Best R&B Album; wrote and produced "Invincible", the lead single from Kelly Clarkson's 2015 album Piece by Piece; wrote and produced "Clumsy", the second single from the 2016 Britney Spears album Glory; and wrote and produced five tracks on Demi Lovato's 2017 album Tell Me You Love Me, including the lead single "Sorry Not Sorry", winning a 2019 BMI Pop Award for the single. Felder has also written and produced songs for artists including Trey Songz, Rihanna, Miguel, Kehlani, Ariana Grande, Jennifer Lopez, Mario, Tamia, ZZ Ward, and Sabrina Carpenter. Felder was named as a top producer by BMI in 2012 and 2013, and won a 2017 BMI Pop Award for co-writing Alessia Cara's "Here", and a 2018 BMI Pop Award for co-writing her single "Scars to Your Beautiful". He also wrote and produced three tracks on Lizzo's 2019 major label debut Cuz I Love You, wrote and produced the top 40 single "Who Do You Love" by The Chainsmokers featuring 5 Seconds of Summer, and working on music with Kehlani, Demi Lovato, and Alessia Cara in 2019.

Felder is published by Reservoir and managed by Lucas Keller and Peter Coquillard at Milk & Honey. Felder is on the board of directors of the Mechanical Licensing Collective, which works to increase the royalty money from streaming companies to songwriters.

== Personal life ==
Felder is married and lives in Atlanta and has a studio in Los Angeles.

== Awards and nominations ==
Year	Award	Category	Work	Result	Ref.
2017	BMI Pop Awards	Songs	"Here" (by Alessia Cara)	Won	
2018	BMI Pop Awards	Songs	"Scars to Your Beautiful" (by Alessia Cara)	Won	
2018	BMI Pop Awards	Songs	"Sorry Not Sorry" (by Demi Lovato)	Won	
2022	Children's and Family Emmy Awards	Outstanding Short Form Program	We the People	Won	
2015	Grammy Awards	Best R&B Song	"Good Kisser" (by Usher)	Nominated	
2026	Primetime Emmy Awards	Outstanding Original Music and Lyrics	"The Devil You Know" (from Spider-Noir) (Episode: "A Mistake I'll Never Make Again")	Nominated	

== Discography ==
=== Writing and producing credits ===
Song	Year	Artist	Album	Songwriter	Producer
"Ain't No Way (You Won't Love Me)"	2005	Chris Brown	Chris Brown	check	check
"Ain't Enough"	2006	3LW	Point of No Return	check	check
"Hurry Up"	2007	Che'Nelle	Things Happen for a Reason	check	check
"Lookin'"	2007	Che'Nelle	Things Happen for a Reason	check	check
"Kryptonite" (featuring Rich Boy)	2007	Mario	Go	check	check
"Why"	2007	Mario	Go	check	check
"Mile In These Shoes"	2007	Jennifer Lopez	Brave		check
"Betcha Never Had"	2007	J. Holiday	Back of My Lac'	check	check
"Superhuman" (featuring Keri Hilson)	2008	Chris Brown	Exclusive: The Forever Edition	check	check
"Single"	2008	Sterling Simms	Yours, Mine & The Truth	check	check
"Jump Off" (featuring Sean P)	2008	Sterling Simms	Yours, Mine & The Truth	check	check
"Sex In the City"	2008	Sterling Simms	Yours, Mine & The Truth	check	check
"Chilosa"	2008	Prima J	Prima J	check	check
"I Can Change Your Life"	2008	Lloyd	Lessons in Love	check	check
"90's Baby"	2008	Karina Pasian	First Love	check	
"Show Off"	2009	Ginuwine	A Man's Thoughts	check	check
"Open the Door"	2009	Ginuwine	A Man's Thoughts	check	check
"Orchestra"	2009	Ginuwine	A Man's Thoughts	check	check
"Hot Mess"	2009	Ashley Tisdale	Guilty Pleasure	check	check
"Hair"	2009	Ashley Tisdale	Guilty Pleasure	check	check
"Robot Love"	2009	Allison Iraheta	Just Like You	check	check
"Your Love"	2010	Nicki Minaj	Pink Friday	check	check
"Save Me"	2010	Nicki Minaj	Pink Friday	check	check
"Unusual" (featuring Drake)	2010	Trey Songz	Passion, Pain & Pleasure	check	check
"Collard Greens & Cornbread"	2010	Fantasia	Back to Me	check	
"Hands Tied"	2010	Toni Braxton	Pulse	check	
"Top Floor"	2011	Wiz Khalifa	Rolling Papers	check	check
"Marvin & Chardonnay" (featuring Kanye West & Roscoe Dash)	2011	Big Sean	Finally Famous	check	check
"Rainbow"	2011	Jessie J	Who You Are	check	check
"I Need This"	2011	Jessie J	Who You Are	check	check
"Only Wanna Give It to You" (featuring J. Cole)	2012	Elle Varner	Perfectly Imperfect	check	check
"Sound Proof Room"	2012	Elle Varner	Perfectly Imperfect	check	check
"I Don't Care"	2012	Elle Varner	Perfectly Imperfect	check	check
"Not Tonight"	2012	Elle Varner	Perfectly Imperfect	check	check
"Leaf"	2012	Elle Varner	Perfectly Imperfect	check	check
"So Fly"	2012	Elle Varner	Perfectly Imperfect	check	check
"Right By My Side" (featuring Chris Brown)	2012	Nicki Minaj	Pink Friday: Roman Reloaded	check	check
"Fire Burns"	2012	Nicki Minaj	Pink Friday: Roman Reloaded	check	check
"Use Me"	2012	Miguel	Kaleidoscope Dream	check	check
"Where's the Fun in Forever"	2012	Miguel	Kaleidoscope Dream	check	check
"Fire We Make" (featuring Maxwell)	2012	Alicia Keys	Girl on Fire	check	check
"Limitedless"	2012	Alicia Keys	Girl on Fire	check	check
"Numb" (featuring Eminem)	2012	Rihanna	Unapologetic	check	check
"Bassline"	2012	Chris Brown	Fortune	check	check
"Wanted"	2013	Tiwa Savage	Once Upon a Time		check
"Written All Over Your Face"	2013	Tiwa Savage	Once Upon a Time		check
"Without My Heart"	2013	Tiwa Savage	Once Upon a Time		check
"V.S.O.P."	2013	K. Michelle	Rebellious Soul	check	check
"Allie Jones"	2013	Mayer Hawthorne	Where Does This Door Go	check	check
"Her Favorite Song"	2013	Mayer Hawthorne	Where Does This Door Go	check	check
"Crime" (featuring Kendrick Lamar)	2013	Mayer Hawthorne	Where Does This Door Go	check	check
"Corsican Rose"	2013	Mayer Hawthorne	Where Does This Door Go	check	check
"The Crying Game" (featuring Jessie Ware)	2014	Nicki Minaj	The Pinkprint	check	
"Good Kisser"	2014	Usher	Hard II Love (Japanese edition)	check	check
"Going Under"	2014	K. Michelle	Anybody Wanna Buy a Heart?		check
"Something About the Night"	2014	K. Michelle	Anybody Wanna Buy a Heart?		check
"Drake Would Love Me"	2014	K. Michelle	Anybody Wanna Buy a Heart?		check
"Chasing Time"	2014	Azealia Banks	Broke With Expensive Taste	check	
"Break Your Heart Right Back" (featuring Childish Gambino)	2014	Ariana Grande	My Everything	check	check
"Seal Me With a Kiss" (featuring De La Soul)	2014	Jessie J	Sweet Talker	check	check
"Wonderful"	2014	Mary J. Blige	Think Like a Man Too (OST)	check	check
"Seventeen"	2015	Alessia Cara	Know-It-All	check	check
"Here"	2015	Alessia Cara	Know-It-All	check	check
"Outlaws"	2015	Alessia Cara	Know-It-All	check	check
"I'm Yours"	2015	Alessia Cara	Know-It-All	check	check
"Overdose"	2015	Alessia Cara	Know-It-All	check	check
"Scars to Your Beautiful"	2015	Alessia Cara	Know-It-All	check	check
"Deal"	2015	Miguel	Wildheart	check	check
"What's Normal Anyway"	2015	Miguel	Wildheart	check	check
"Leaves"	2015	Miguel	Wildheart	check	check
"Invincible"	2015	Kelly Clarkson	Piece by Piece	check	check
"Alone In Your Heart"	2015	Monica	Code Red	check	check
"Trade Hearts" (featuring Julia Michaels)	2015	Jason Derulo	Everything Is 4	check	check
"Love Falls Over Me"	2015	Tamia	Love Life	check	check
"Sandwich and a Soda"	2015	Tamia	Love Life	check	check
"Clumsy"	2016	Britney Spears	Glory	check	check
"Counterfeit"	2016	Jordan Fisher	Jordan Fisher	check	check
"Sleep Like a Baby"	2016	K. Michelle	More Issues Than Vogue	check	check
"Yes Girl"	2016	Bea Miller	Non-album single	check	check
"How Far I'll Go"	2016	Alessia Cara	Moana OST		check
"Distraction"	2017	Kehlani	SweetSexySavage	check	check
"Piece of Mind"	2017	Kehlani	SweetSexySavage	check	check
"Not Used to It"	2017	Kehlani	SweetSexySavage	check	check
"Everything Is Yours"	2017	Kehlani	SweetSexySavage	check	check
"Advice"	2017	Kehlani	SweetSexySavage	check	check
"Escape"	2017	Kehlani	SweetSexySavage	check	check
"In My Feelings"	2017	Kehlani	SweetSexySavage	check	check
"Hold Me By the Heart"	2017	Kehlani	SweetSexySavage	check	check
"Thank You"	2017	Kehlani	SweetSexySavage	check	check
"Sorry Not Sorry"	2017	Demi Lovato	Tell Me You Love Me	check	check
"Sexy Dirty Love"	2017	Demi Lovato	Tell Me You Love Me	check	check
"Daddy Issues"	2017	Demi Lovato	Tell Me You Love Me	check	check
"Only Forever"	2017	Demi Lovato	Tell Me You Love Me	check	check
"Games"	2017	Demi Lovato	Tell Me You Love Me	check	check
"The Deep" (featuring Joey Purp)	2017	ZZ Ward	Non-album single	check	
"Ghost"	2017	ZZ Ward	The Storm	check	check
"Let It Burn"	2017	ZZ Ward	The Storm	check	check
"Hold On"	2017	ZZ Ward	The Storm	check	check
"Burning Bridges"	2017	Bea Miller	Chapter One: Blue	check	check
"Warmer"	2017	Bea Miller	Chapter Two: Red	check	check
"To the Grave"	2017	Bea Miller	Chapter Three: Yellow	check	check
"Either Way" (featuring Joey Bada$$)	2017	Snakehips with Anne-Marie	Non-album single	check	check
"Out of Your Mind" (featuring Alison Wonderland)	2018	The Presets	Hi Viz	check	
"I Don't Lack Imagination"	2018	E^ST	Life Ain't Always Roses	check	check
"Stop Myself (Only Human)"	2018	Calum Scott	Only Human	check	check
"I Guess That's Why They Call It The Blues"	2018	Alessia Cara	Revamp: The Songs of Elton John & Bernie Taupin		check
"Growing Pains"	2018	Alessia Cara	The Pains of Growing	check	check
"7 Days"	2018	Alessia Cara	The Pains of Growing	check	check
"Trust My Lonely"	2018	Alessia Cara	The Pains of Growing	check	check
"All We Know"	2018	Alessia Cara	The Pains of Growing	check	check
"Easier Said"	2018	Alessia Cara	The Pains of Growing	check	check
"Sue Me"	2018	Sabrina Carpenter	Singular: Act I	check	check
"Coming to My Senses"	2018	Alina Baraz	The Color of You		check
"I Don't Even Know Why Though"		Alina Baraz	The Color of You	check	check
"Who Do You Love" (featuring 5 Seconds of Summer)	2019	The Chainsmokers	World War Joy	check	check
"Like A Girl"	2019	Lizzo	Cuz I Love You	check	check
"Soulmate"	2019	Lizzo	Cuz I Love You	check	check
"Better In Color"	2019	Lizzo	Cuz I Love You	check	check
"FML"	2019	Mabel	High Expectations	check	check
"Just a Boy"	2019	Olivia O'Brien	Was It Even Real?	check	check
"Pushing 20"	2019	Sabrina Carpenter	Singular: Act II	check	check
"Take Off All Your Cool"	2019	Sabrina Carpenter	Singular: Act II	check	check
"Sunday"	2019	Jessica Mauboy	Hilda	check	check
"Birthday"	2020	Anne-Marie	Therapy (Japanese Edition)	check	check
"I Love Me"	2020	Demi Lovato	Non-album single	check	check
"Ting Ting Ting" (with Oliver Heldens)	2020	Itzy	It'z Me	check	check
"Change Your Life" (featuring Jhené Aiko)	2020	Kehlani	It Was Good Until It Wasn't	check	check
"This Is What They Say"	2020	Carly Rae Jepsen	Dedicated Side B	check	check
"Ooh Laa"	2020	John Legend	Bigger Love	check	check
"Actions"	2020	John Legend	Bigger Love	check	check
"Favorite Place"	2020	John Legend	Bigger Love		check
"Blossom"	2020	Azealia Banks	Fantasea II: The Second Wave		check
"The Art of Starting Over"	2021	Demi Lovato	Dancing with the Devil... the Art of Starting Over	check	check
"Lonely People"	2021	Demi Lovato	Dancing with the Devil... the Art of Starting Over	check	check
"Melon Cake"	2021	Demi Lovato	Dancing with the Devil... the Art of Starting Over		check
"The Kind of Lover I Am"	2021	Demi Lovato	Dancing with the Devil... the Art of Starting Over	check	check
"15 Minutes"	2021	Demi Lovato	Dancing with the Devil... the Art of Starting Over	check	check
"My Girlfriends Are My Boyfriend" (featuring Saweetie)	2021	Demi Lovato	Dancing with the Devil... the Art of Starting Over	check	check
"California Sober"	2021	Demi Lovato	Dancing with the Devil... the Art of Starting Over	check	check
"Good Place"	2021	Demi Lovato	Dancing with the Devil... the Art of Starting Over		check
"Starting Now"	2021	Brandy	Disney Princess Remixed — An Ultimate Princess Celebration		check
"FREAK" (Feat. Yungblud)	2022	Demi Lovato	Holy Fvck	check	check
"SKIN OF MY TEETH"	2022	Demi Lovato	Holy Fvck	check	check
"SUBSTANCE"	2022	Demi Lovato	Holy Fvck	check	check
"EAT ME" (featuring Royal & the Serpent	2022	Demi Lovato	Holy Fvck	check	check
"HOLY FVCK"	2022	Demi Lovato	Holy Fvck	check	check
"29"	2022	Demi Lovato	Holy Fvck	check	check
"HAPPY ENDING"	2022	Demi Lovato	Holy Fvck	check	check
"HEAVEN"	2022	Demi Lovato	Holy Fvck	check	check
"CITY OF ANGELS"	2022	Demi Lovato	Holy Fvck	check	check
"BONES"	2022	Demi Lovato	Holy Fvck	check	check
"WASTED"	2022	Demi Lovato	Holy Fvck	check	check
"COME TOGETHER"	2022	Demi Lovato	Holy Fvck	check	check
"DEAD FRIENDS"	2022	Demi Lovato	Holy Fvck	check	check
"HELP ME" (featuring Dead Sara)	2022	Demi Lovato	Holy Fvck	check	check
"FEED"	2022	Demi Lovato	Holy Fvck	check	check
"4 EVER 4 ME"	2022	Demi Lovato	Holy Fvck	check	check
"You Only Love Me"	2023	Rita Ora	You & I		check
"Remedied"	2026	FLO	Therapy at the Club	check	check
