= Beyond a Dream =

Beyond a Dream may refer to:

- Beyond a Dream (By All Means album), 1989
- Beyond a Dream (Pharoah Sanders and Norman Connors album), 1981
- Beyond a Dream (Twila Paris album), 1993
