= By All Means =

American vocal group

Background information
- Origin: United States
- Genres: R&B
- Years active: 1988–1992
- Labels: Fourth and Broadway, Motown, Island
- Past members: James Varner; Lynn Roderick; Billy Sheppard

By All Means was an American male/female vocal group, consisting of James Varner, Lynn Roderick, and Billy Sheppard.

Their single "I Surrender to Your Love" was released on the Fourth and Broadway label, and entered the UK Singles Chart on 18 June 1988. It reached a high of No. 65, and was in the chart for two weeks.

Their self-titled album was also released on the Fourth and Broadway label, and it entered the UK Albums Chart on 16 July 1988, and reached No. 80; it was only in the chart for one week. They released another album in 1989 called Beyond a Dream and their final album on Motown Records It's Real in 1992. This album scored the band one of their biggest U.S. hits, "The Feeling I Get". However, they split up soon after.

Two of the members of By All Means, Lynn Roderick and James Varner, have a daughter also in music, Elle Varner. They both made appearances on her debut album Perfectly Imperfect as background singers, songwriters, and producers on a few songs.

In May 2023, By All Means lead singer James Varner died at the age of 59.

== Discography ==
Year	Album	Record label
1988	By All Means	Island
1989	Beyond a Dream	Island
1992	It's Real	Motown
