= It's Real =

It's Real may refer to:

- It's Real (K-Ci & JoJo album), 1999
- It's Real (James Ingram album), 1989
- It's Real (By All Means album), 1992
- It's Real (Ex Hex album), 2019
- It's Real, a 2003 album by Wheesung
- It's Real, a 2011 song by Real Estate, from the album Days (album)
