= By All Means (album) =

Studio album by By All Means
- Released: 1988
- Studio: Monterrey Sound, Studio Masters, Mirage Pro Recorders
- Genre: Soul; R&B
- Length: 45:23
- Label: Island
- Producer: Stan Sheppard

By All Means chronology
By All Means (1988)	Beyond a Dream (1989)

Professional ratings
Review scores
Source	Rating
AllMusic	4/5 stars

By All Means is the debut album by American music group By All Means, released in 1988 on Island Records. It includes the hits "I Surrender to Your Love" and "You Decided to Go".

== Track listing ==
#	Title	Writers	Length
1.	"I Surrender to Your Love"	Jimmy Varner/Stan Sheppard	4:43
2.	"I'm the One Who Loves You"	Jimmy Varner/Stan Sheppard/Terry Carter	4:56
3.	"You Decided to Go"	Jimmy Varner/Lynn Roderick/Stan Sheppard	4:40
4.	"I Believe in You"	Billy Sheppard/Jimmy Varner/Stan Sheppard	4:00
5.	"I Want to Thank You"	Jimmy Varner/Stan Sheppard	5:07
6.	"Let's Get Started Now"	Jimmy Varner/Stan Sheppard	4:29
7.	"Slow Jam (Can I Have This Dance with You)"	Jimmy Varner/Stan Sheppard	5:04
8.	"Somebody Save Me"	Shedrick Guy/Guy Vaughn	4:30
9.	"Does It Feel Good to You"	Jimmy Varner/Stan Sheppard	3:58
10.	"We're into This Groove"	Jimmy Varner/Stan Sheppard	4:13

== Personnel ==
=== By All Means ===
- Lynn Roderick: Vocals
- Billy Sheppard: Vocals
- James "Jimmy" Varner: Vocals. Keyboards, Drum Programming and Rhythm Arrangements

=== Additional personnel ===
- Alfie Silas, Lynne Fiddmont: Backing Vocals
- Charles Fearing, Jeff Curtis, Paul Jackson, Jr: Guitars
- Paulinho da Costa: Percussion
- Brandon Fields, Gerald Albright: Saxophone
- Terry Carter, The Fly Guys: Keyboards and Drum Programming
