= Burnin' Up (Jessie J song) =

Single by Jessie J featuring 2 Chainz

from the album Sweet Talker
- Released: September 23, 2014
- Studio: Quad Studios (New York, NY)
- Genre: Dance-pop; hip hop; R&B
- Length: 3:37
- Label: Lava; Republic
- Songwriters: Jessica Cornish; Andreas Schuller; Eric Frederic; Rickard Göransson; Jacob Kasher; Chloe Angelides; Gamal Lewis; Tauheed Epps
- Producers: Axident; Ricky Reed

Jessie J singles chronology
"Bang Bang" (2014)	"Burnin' Up" (2014)	"Masterpiece" (2015)

2 Chainz singles chronology
"Don't Shoot" (2014)	"Burnin' Up" (2014)	"U Guessed It (Remix)" (2014)

Music video
- "Burnin' Up" on YouTube

Burnin' Up is a song by English singer Jessie J, featuring American rapper 2 Chainz. It was released on September 23, 2014, serving as the second single from her third studio album, Sweet Talker. The song received acclaim from music critics who praised Jessie J's vocal performance.

== Background ==
The promotional single was announced on August 19, 2014 via Twitter. On the same day, Jessie revealed a snippet of the song and the cover artwork on her Instagram account. In August, Jessie teased a snippet of 2 Chainz's verse on the song in an interview with Idolator.

== Critical reception ==
"Burnin' Up" received acclaim from music critics, most of whom commended and praised Jessie J's vocal performance. Idolator gave the song a positive review saying "Like 'Bang Bang', it’s all about those diva-sized pipes (and some major heavy breathing!), as Jessie struts through the fire and loses her mind. 2 Chainz comes in later for his own spitfire contribution", adding that "the song’s a catchy burst of energy for sure, and who knows? Perhaps even American radio will be set ablaze".

Music Times also gave the song a very positive review, stating that "the bombastic, ominous opening has its tension cut quite quickly with uncharacteristically restrained vocals from J, though she soon builds up to those powerhouse volumes and notes that she's been well known for". Billboard awarded the song 3 out of 5 stars, saying that "While her vocals flirt with ostentatiousness, 2 Chainz is all chill, smoothly rhyming 'corridor' with 'Oreo'." The Wire was less positive in their review, saying that compared to 'Bang Bang', the song is a "stepdown", adding that "'Burnin' Up' makes it clear Jessie has the recipe down – take one strong vocalist, add popular producer and rap verse, stir. But like any good cook, the recipe isn't enough".

== Chart performance ==
"Burnin Up" was less successful than her previous single "Bang Bang", peaking at number 86 on the Billboard Hot 100 and number 100 on the Canadian Hot 100.

In Europe, the song wasn't successful charting at number 44 in Belgium. The single is among Jessie J's least successful in the United Kingdom charting at number 73 selling only 5,011 copies and 12,000 in total.

In Australia, the song debuted at number 63, yet on the Australian Urban Chart it charted at number 6.

== Music video ==
On September 24, 2014, Jessie posted a teaser of the music video on Instagram. On October 3, 2014, an exclusive behind-the-scenes video was released. The video, directed by Hannah Lux Davis, was released on October 8, 2014.

== Track listing ==
Digital Download

1. "Burnin' Up" (featuring 2 Chainz) — 3:37

Digital Remixes

1. "Burnin' Up" (Don Diablo Remix) — 4:30
2. "Burnin' Up" (Clinton Sparks Ultra Lounge Remix) — 4:09
3. "Burnin' Up" (Aero Chord Remix) — 3:44
4. "Burnin' Up" (KANT Remix Radio Edit) — 3:17
5. "Burnin' Up" (Gazzo Remix Radio Edit) — 4:14

== Charts ==
Chart (2014–15)	Peak position
Australia (ARIA)	63
Australia Urban (ARIA)	6
Belgium (Ultratip Bubbling Under Flanders)	44
Belgium Urban (Ultratop Flanders)	30
Canada Hot 100 (Billboard)	100
Canada CHR/Top 40 (Billboard)	39
South Korea International Chart (GAON)	89
UK Singles (Official Charts Company)	73
US Billboard Hot 100	86
US Dance Club Songs (Billboard)	33
US Pop Airplay (Billboard)	28

== Release history ==
Release dates and formats for "Burnin' Up"
Region	Date	Format	Label(s)	Ref.
United States	October 14, 2014	Mainstream airplay	Republic	
