= Masterpiece (Jessie J song) =

Single by Jessie J

from the album Sweet Talker
- Released: 13 January 2015
- Studio: Cryptic Studios, Venice; The Record Plant, Los Angeles
- Genre: Pop
- Length: 3:40
- Label: Lava; Republic
- Songwriters: Josh Alexander; Britt Burton; Emily Warren; Bistro
- Producer: Josh Alexander

Jessie J singles chronology
"Burnin' Up" (2014)	"Masterpiece" (2015)	"Flashlight" (2015)

Music video
- "Masterpiece" on YouTube

"Masterpiece" is song recorded by English singer Jessie J released as the third single from her third studio album, Sweet Talker (2014). The song was written and produced by Josh Alexander and was co-written by Britt Burton and Emily Warren, the latter of whom also co-wrote the album's opening track "Ain't Been Done". "Masterpiece" was released to iTunes on 7 October 2014, alongside "Ain't Been Done", as the second and third promotional singles off Sweet Talker, respectively. It was released to US radio January 13, 2015 as the third international single and fourth from the album overall, while its music video premiered December 10, 2014.

It received generally positive reviews from contemporary music critics, who applauded the song's anthemic nature but others criticized it for being too generic. Even before being promoted as an official single, "Masterpiece" entered the Billboard Canadian Hot 100 at number 82 for the week of October 25, 2014. It later charted in the top 10 in Austria, Germany, and Switzerland following its official release.

== Composition ==
"Masterpiece" is a pop song about self-empowerment and living up to one's potential. Its instrumentation incorporates piano, synthesized beats, and a string section. Critics have noted the song's thematic similarity to her debut album, Who You Are, in that it is "addressed to her haters".

== Critical reception ==
The song has received mixed to positive reviews. Lewis Corner at Digital Spy declared the song "ballsy", but was critical of its clichéd lyrics. "It's a trap Jessie falls into a few times on the record," writes Lewis, "either diluting a song's impact with hackneyed lyrics or trilling beyond reason." Mike Wass of Idolator cited "Masterpiece" as a highlight of the album, noting that Jessie J "gets it just right" and that it is "a genuinely good pop song". Ken Capobianco of The Boston Globe found "Masterpiece" to be demonstrative of what he called Jessie J's "disconcerting tendency to over-emote". Caroline Sullivan of The Guardian compared "Masterpiece" to the music of American singer-songwriter Pink for being "heavy with pop-rock melodrama and strength-from-within ruminating". In his review of Sweet Talker, Dave Hanratty of Drowned in Sound condemned "Masterpiece" for being overly generic, but was moderately receptive of the production and Jessie J's vocals. Time named the track as the third worst song of 2014, commenting that "a song about how one's undaunted by mistakes in the public eye seems delusional when sung by someone with no persona to speak of".

== Chart performance ==
Across Europe, "Masterpiece" was a moderate success, managing to chart inside the top 10 in countries such as Germany and Austria. In the United Kingdom, however, the single charted outside the top 100 at number 159. This is Jessie J's lowest charting single of her career in the UK due to the fact it was not actually released as a single and the version that charted was the album version with streaming included.

In Oceania, the single had greater success. In Australia the single debuted at number 14 and was certified Gold by ARIA for sales over 35,000. In New Zealand, the single was successful charting at number 13 and was certified Gold by RMNZ for sales over 7,500.

In the US, the single managed to chart inside the Billboard 100 at number 65 as well as charting in Canada at number 74.

== Live performances ==
"Masterpiece" was performed in the UK on The Graham Norton Show in January 2015. In the US, Jessie J performed the single on Dancing with the Stars where she was a guest judge, Jimmy Kimmel Live and on The Voice of Germany featuring all four finalists of the show, in November 2014, and on The Voice US in December 2014 as part of the finale featuring finalist Chris Jamison. Jessie J performed the single at the 3rd Indonesian Choice Awards on May 29, 2016.

== Music video ==
An official lyric video premiered on the official YouTube channel for Republic Records on November 10, 2014. The clip revolves around an aspiring dancer training in a studio space with the lyrics displayed in a graphic all-capital font.

The official video for "Masterpiece" was recorded in Los Angeles on November 13 and 14. Directed by Tabitha Denholm, it premiered December 10, 2014.

== Credits and personnel ==
Credits adapted from the liner notes of Sweet Talker. Locations

- Recorded at Cryptic Studios, Venice; The Record Plant, Los Angeles
- Mixed at The Larrabee North Studios, Universal City.

Personnel

- Songwriting – Josh Alexander, Britt Burton, Emily Warren
- Production – Josh Alexander
- Vocal production – Kuk Harrell
- Engineering – Daniel Zaidenstadt, Josh Alexander
- Assistant engineering – Blake Mares, Robert Cohen
- Mixing – Manny Marroquin
- Mixing assistant – Chris Galland, Ike Schultz
- Logic and Pro-Tools Technician – Scott Roewe
- Instrumentation – Josh Alexander

== Charts ==
=== Weekly charts ===
Chart (2014–15)	Peak position
Australia (ARIA)	14
Australia Urban (ARIA)	3
Austria (Ö3 Austria Top 40)	9
Canada Hot 100 (Billboard)	74
Germany (GfK)	10
New Zealand (Recorded Music NZ)	13
South Korea International (Gaon Chart)	27
Switzerland (Schweizer Hitparade)	9
UK Singles (Official Charts Company)	159
US Billboard Hot 100	65
US Pop Airplay (Billboard)	30

=== Year-end charts ===
Chart (2015)	Position
Australia (ARIA)	97
Australia Urban (ARIA)	14

== Certifications ==
Region	Certification	Certified units/sales
Australia (ARIA)	2× Platinum	140,000^{‡}
Brazil (Pro-Música Brasil)	Platinum	60,000^{‡}
Germany (BVMI)	Gold	200,000^{‡}
New Zealand (RMNZ)	Platinum	15,000^{*}
^{*} Sales figures based on certification alone.^{‡} Sales+streaming figures based on certification alone.

== Release history ==
Country	Date	Format	Label
United States	January 13, 2015	Mainstream radio	Lava; Republic
United States	January 13, 2015	Hot adult contemporary	Lava; Republic
United Kingdom	March 23, 2015	Mainstream radio	Lava; Republic
