= Sweet Talker (Jessie J album) =

Studio album by Jessie J
- Released: 13 October 2014
- Studios: The Garage (Long Beach, CA); Germano Studios (New York, NY); The Record Plant (Los Angeles, CA); Quad Studios (New York, NY); Metropolis Studios (London); Glenwood Place Studios (Burbank, CA); Conway Recording Studios (Los Angeles, CA); Angel Studios (London); Black Kiss Studio (Warsaw); Cake Studios (London); Cryptic Studios (Los Angeles, CA); Big Noize Productions (Los Angeles, CA); Westlake Recording Studios (Hollywood, CA); Studio PT (Las Vegas, NV); London Police Station (London); Rokstone Studios (London); DFRNS Studios (Holland); Sarm Studios (London); The Mothership (Hollywood, CA)
- Genre: Pop
- Length: 44:50
- Labels: Lava; Island
- Producers: Josh Alexander; Ammo; Axident; Louis Biancaniello; Sam Watters; Steve Booker; The DFRNS; Diplo; David Gamson; Godz of Analog; C. "Tricky" Stewart; Ryan Vojtesak; Pop & Oak; William Wiik Larsen (Will IDAP); Max Martin

Jessie J chronology
Alive (2013)	Sweet Talker (2014)	R.O.S.E. (2018)

Singles from Sweet Talker
- 1. "Bang Bang" Released: 28 July 2014; 2. "Burnin' Up" Released: 23 September 2014; 3. "Masterpiece" Released: 13 January 2015; 4. "Ain't Been Done" Released: 10 July 2015

Sweet Talker is the third studio album by English singer-songwriter Jessie J. It was released on 13 October 2014, by Lava Records and Island Records. Contributing on the album; including rappers 2 Chainz, and Nicki Minaj, singer Ariana Grande, making guest appearances, and the addition to the album was the hip hop group De La Soul and the violinist Lindsey Stirling. Jessie co-wrote the album and worked with several producers such as The-Dream, Diplo, Tricky Stewart, Max Martin, Ammo and amongst the hosts of collaborators from both the new and the old.

The album was preceded by the lead single, "Bang Bang" (with Ariana Grande and Nicki Minaj), which met with critical acclaim from music critics. It also became a worldwide hit, topping the charts in the United Kingdom, reaching the top 10 in Australia, Canada, Denmark, New Zealand, and reaching the top 3 in the United States, becoming Jessie's most successful single. The third single, "Masterpiece" was also successful by reaching the top-ten; including Germany, Switzerland and Austria as well as the top-twenty in Australia and New Zealand. Moreover, the song scored Jessie J her fifth US Billboard Hot 100 hit, following the aforementioned "Bang Bang".

Upon its release, the album received generally mixed reviews from music critics, some of whom commended Jessie's vocal performance, confidence and the production, while others criticised the lack of creativity. In the United States, Sweet Talker debuted at number ten on the US Billboard 200, selling 25,000 copies in its first week. Sweet Talker became Jessie J's first top ten album and her highest charting album in the US to date. In the United Kingdom (Jessie J's home country), "Sweet Talker" debuted at number five selling 16,733 copies, and is certified Silver for sales over 60,000.

== Background ==
After releasing her second studio album, Alive, in the United Kingdom on 22 September 2013, Jessie J announced that the American version of the album would be pushed back because her American label "didn't feel the album would work on their territory". She was then rumored to be recording new material for an American re-release of the album with Pharrell Williams. In an interview, the singer discussed the possibility of moving to the United States in an effort to break back into the country's market. Jessie later said the American version of the album was expected to be released in 2014. However, the re-release idea was eventually scrapped. The project became her third studio album, featuring the material recorded with Williams, as well as contributions from producers such as Max Martin and Ammo.

== Promotion ==
"Ain't Been Done", "Keep Us Together", "Sweet Talker" and "You Don't Really Know Me" were all performed live at Rock in Rio Lisbon on 1 June 2014. "Bang Bang" was performed live on the Elvis Duran and the Morning Show on 31 July 2014. Moreover, the song was performed as part of the opening medley held by Jessie, Ariana Grande and Nicki Minaj during the MTV VMAs 2014. In August, Jessie teased a snippet of 2 Chainz's verse on "Burnin' Up" in an interview with Idolator. On 22 September 2014, Jessie performed at iTunes Festival in London. She sang some songs from the new album, like "Sweet Talker", "Your Loss I'm Found", "Keep Us Together", "You Don't Really Know Me", "Ain't Been Done", "Burnin' Up", and "Bang Bang". On 30 September 2014, Jessie announced via Twitter that "Personal" was made available on iTunes for anyone who pre-ordered the entire album as a promotional single. "Ain't Been Done" and "Masterpiece" were made available as promotional singles in the same manner on 7 October 2014.

=== Sweet Talker Tour ===
On 4 November 2014, Jessie J announced a six-date tour in the UK. An extra London date was added due to popular demand after tickets sold out for the first date. During 2015 Jessie J travelled around the world promoting her album on the Sweet Talker Tour.

== Singles ==
The album's first single, "Bang Bang" featuring Ariana Grande and Nicki Minaj, was first sent to hot adult contemporary radio on 28 July 2014 through Republic Records, the label that houses all three artists, being released as a digital download the next day through Lava and Republic, and serves as a joint single. Commercially, the song became a worldwide hit, debuting at number 6 on the US Billboard Hot 100, and eventually peaking at number 3, making it Jessie's highest peaking song on the chart. It also reached the top ten in Canada, Australia and New Zealand.

On 19 September Jessie announced on Instagram that the official second single is "Burnin' Up" featuring 2 Chainz. The single was released on 23 September on iTunes. On 22 September the song leaked 24 hours earlier than expected. Despite planned release in the United Kingdom, Jessie J's management failed to release it to mainstream radio and as a digital single.

"Masterpiece" was released as the third single from the album. Originally released digitally 7 October 2014 as a promotional single, its music video premiered 10 December 2014 to promote it as the next official single. The single was planned to be added to UK contemporary hit radio on 23 March 2015 but this failed to comprehend for the third time. Despite this, efforts from fans pushed the album song to enter the UK Singles chart at 159.

On 10 July 2015, "Ain’t Been Done" was released in Australia and it peaked at number 47 on the ARIA charts.

=== Promotional singles ===
The title track, "Sweet Talker", was released as a promotional single in the UK and Ireland on 1 December 2014.

== Critical reception ==
Professional ratings
Aggregate scores
Source	Rating
AnyDecentMusic?	5.1/10
Metacritic	56/100
Review scores
Source	Rating
ABC	2.5/5 stars
AllMusic	3/5 stars
The A.V. Club	C
Digital Spy	3.5/5 stars
Drowned in Sound	2/10
Entertainment Weekly	B
The Guardian	3/5 stars
MTV UK	4/5 stars
Slant Magazine	2.5/5 stars

The album received mixed reviews from music critics, some of whom complimented Jessie J's confidence and vocals and the overall production, whilst others criticised the songs for being "generic". Joanne Dorken from MTV gave it 4 out 5 stars saying that Jessie was "back with a bang!" and said J's "fans were in for a treat", praising tracks like "Ain't Been Done", "Fire", "Masterpiece" and "Sweet Talker", adding that "Overall, Jessie's third offering sees her going back to basics, while also teaming up with a whole hoard of songwriters (52 in total) to craft her more grown-up, more honest sound." The Guardian gave the album a positive review, stating that "[J] constructed Sweet Talker to fit a gap somewhere between Beyoncé and Pink", adding that "it's notable that the best moments come when she uncouples herself from it and just sings for the joy of it, as on the brilliant, fizzy pop banger 'Bang Bang', a deserved No 1 this summer".

Slant Magazine was more critical towards the album, giving it a mixed review, praising the first four tracks on the album but stating that "If all Jessie's label wanted was a few bangers, they could have saved themselves some time and money by tacking them onto a repackaged version of Alive and calling it a day". Katherine St. Aspah of Time was harsher still, claiming that the album "solved the problem of doing everything right [to only moderate success]", and comes across as "slapdash and retooled to an inch of its life". Aspah did reiterate that "the one distinguishing factor of the Jessie J Brand, as demonstrated on Sweet Talker, is that she can sing", but then went on to clarify that it seemed "a curious statement to make in 2014, as the year's biggest divas, our Beyoncés and Arianas, aren't short on chops". Slant Magazine named it the eighth worst album of 2014.

== Commercial performance ==
In the United States, Sweet Talker debuted at number ten on the US Billboard 200, selling 25,000 copies in its first week. Despite selling 9,000 copies less than her previous US album, Who You Are, Sweet Talker became Jessie J's first top ten album and her highest charting album in the US to date. In the United Kingdom, "Sweet Talker" debuted at number five selling 16,733 copies, and is certified Gold for sales of over 100,000. The album spent a total of 4 weeks inside the Top 40 of the UK Albums Chart.

== Track listing ==
Sweet Talker — Standard edition
No.	Title	Writer(s)	Producer(s)	Length
1.	"Ain't Been Done"	David Gamson; Emily Warren; Scott Harris	Gamson	3:00
2.	"Burnin' Up" (featuring 2 Chainz)	Jessica Cornish; Andreas Schuller; Eric Frederic; Chloe Angelides; Jacob Kasher Hindlin; Rickard Göransson; Gamal Lewis; Tauheed Epps	Axident; Ricky Reed	3:40
3.	"Sweet Talker"	Cornish; Thomas Wesley Pentz; Clement Picard; Maxime Picard; Alessia DeGasperis Brigante; Yonatan Ayal; James Somani	Diplo; The Picard Brothers	3:42
4.	"Bang Bang" (with Ariana Grande & Nicki Minaj)	Max Martin; Savan Kotecha; Ariana Grande; Göransson; Onika Maraj	Martin; Göransson; Ilya; Kuk Harrell	3:19
5.	"Fire"	Steve Booker; John Newman	Booker	3:56
6.	"Personal"	Elle Varner; Jenna Andrews; William Wiik Larsen	Will IDAP	3:54
7.	"Masterpiece"	Josh Alexander; Britt Burton; Warren	Alexander	3:40
8.	"Seal Me with a Kiss" (featuring De La Soul)	Cornish; Andrew "Pop" Wansel; Warren "Oak" Felder; George Clinton; Philippé Wynne; Kelvin Mercer; Dave Jolicoeur	Pop & Oak	3:53
9.	"Said Too Much"	Cornish; Jonas Jeberg; Sean Douglas; Jason Evigan	Jeberg	3:34
10.	"Loud" (featuring Lindsey Stirling)	Terius "The-Dream" Nash; Christopher A. Stewart	Godz of Analog; C. "Tricky" Stewart; Nash	4:33
11.	"Keep Us Together"	Louis Biancaniello; Sevyn Streeter; Stepan Taft; Cory Rooney; Ryan Vojtesak	Biancaniello; Lifted; Vojtesak	3:49
12.	"Get Away"	Cornish; Steve Mac; Wayne Hector	Mac; Kuk Harrell	3:50
Total length:				44:50

Sweet Talker — Deluxe edition (bonus tracks)
No.	Title	Writer(s)	Producer(s)	Length
13.	"Your Loss I'm Found"	Cornish; Hidde Huijsman; Massimo Cacciapuoti; Harrell; Michel van der Zanden	The DFRNS; Harrell	3:37
14.	"Strip"	Cornish; Joshua Coleman; Claude Kelly	Ammo	3:33
15.	"You Don't Really Know Me"	Cornish; Lewis Allen	Harrell	3:55
Total length:				55:55

Note

- Vocal production on every track was handled by Kuk Harrell with the exception of "Strip", which contains vocal production by Claude Kelly and "Personal", which contains vocal production by Jenna Andrews in addition to Harrell.

Sample credit

- "Seal Me with a Kiss" contains an interpolation of "(Not Just) Knee Deep", written by George Clinton and Philippé Wynne.

== Personnel ==
Credits for Sweet Talker adapted from Barnes & Noble.

Performance credits

- Jessie J – primary artist, background vocals
- Louis Biancaniello – keyboards
- Steve Booker – bass, percussion, keyboards
- Susan Dench – viola
- David Gamson – drums, keyboards
- Ivan McCready – cello
- Leo Payne – violin
- Audrey Riley – conductor
- Cathy Thompson – violin
- Fenella Barton – violin
- Joy Hawley – cello
- Peter Lale – viola
- Clare Thompson – violin
- Andrew Parker – viola
- Max Martin – keyboards
- Joi Gilliam – background vocals
- Ian Humphries – violin
- Derrick McKenzie – drums
- Warren Zielinski – violin
- Sophie Harris – cello
- Nick Barr – violin
- Roland Roberts – violin
- Adrian Bradbury – cello
- Ilya – background vocals
- Joan Atherton – violin
- Richard George – violin
- Bridget Carey – viola
- Laura Melhuish – violin
- Courtney Harrell – background vocals
- Lifted – keyboards
- Rickard Goransson – bass, percussion, keyboards, background vocals
- Boguslav Kostecki – violin
- Katherine Gowers – violin
- Taura Stinson – background vocals
- Greg Warren Wilson – violin
- William "Nasty Kutt" Wiik Larsen – background vocals
- 2 Chainz – vocals
- Peter Carlsson – percussion, drums
- Ricky Reed – background vocals
- Chris Trombling – violin
- Chonita Gillespie – background vocals
- Kathy Gowers – violin
- Jon Hill – violin

Technical credits

- Louis Biancaniello – programming, producer
- Steve Booker – programming, producer, string arrangements
- David Gamson – programming, producer, engineer
- Pat Thrall – engineer
- Scott Roewe – pro-Tools
- Tom Coyne – mastering
- Kuk Harrell – producer, vocal engineer, vocal producer
- Scott Harris – programming
- Max Martin – programming, producer
- Steve Mac – producer, string arrangements, piano arrangement
- Josh Alexander – programming, producer, instrumentation
- Chris Laws – engineer
- Diplo – producer
- Pop! – instrumentation
- Jonas Jeberg – producer
- Lifted – programming, producer
- Todd Russell – art direction
- Andrew Wuepper – engineer
- Smit – programming
- Rickard Goransson – programming, producer
- Sam Holland – engineer
- C. "Tricky" Stewart – programming, producer
- Dann Pursey – engineer
- Brian "B-Luv" Thomas – engineer
- Rob Stevenson – executive producer
- Terius "The-Dream" Nash – producer
- Jenna Andrews – vocal producer
- Pop Wansel – producer
- William "Nasty Kutt" Wiik Larsen – instrumentation
- Antonio Rizzello – programming
- Oak Felder – instrumentation, producer
- Peter Carlsson – vocal engineer, vocal editing
- Daniel Zaidenstadt – engineer
- Axident – producer, engineer
- Will Idap – producer
- Ricky Reed – producer, engineer
- Picard Brothers – programming, producer
- Ryan Vojtesak – producer
- Chris Trombling – orchestra leader
- Alessia Degasperis Brigante – composer
- Jack Brown – vocal engineer
- Arek Kopera – drum engineering
- Godz of Analog – producer

== Charts ==
=== Weekly charts ===
Weekly chart performance for Sweet Talker
Chart (2014)	Peak position
Australian Albums (ARIA)	14
Austrian Albums (Ö3 Austria)	25
Belgian Albums (Ultratop Flanders)	22
Belgian Albums (Ultratop Wallonia)	42
Canadian Albums (Billboard)	16
Croatian Albums (Toplista)	7
Danish Albums (Hitlisten)	26
Dutch Albums (Album Top 100)	19
French Albums (SNEP)	131
German Albums (Offizielle Top 100)	25
Irish Albums (IRMA)	11
Italian Albums (FIMI)	33
New Zealand Albums (RMNZ)	13
Norwegian Albums (VG-lista)	15
Portuguese Albums (AFP)	30
Scottish Albums (Official Charts)	6
South Korean Albums (Gaon Chart)	15
Spanish Albums (Promusicae)	20
Swedish Albums (Sverigetopplistan)	15
Swiss Albums (Schweizer Hitparade)	12
UK Albums (Official Charts)	5
US Billboard 200	10

=== Year-end charts ===
Year-end chart performance for Sweet Talker
Chart (2015)	Position
US Billboard 200	145

== Certifications ==
Certifications for Sweet Talker
Region	Certification	Certified units/sales
Brazil (Pro-Música Brasil)	Gold	20,000^{*}
United Kingdom (BPI)	Gold	100,000^{‡}
^{*} Sales figures based on certification alone.^{‡} Sales+streaming figures based on certification alone.

== Release history ==
Release history for Sweet Talker
Region	Date	Label	Edition
United Kingdom	13 October 2014	Island	Standard/Deluxe edition
Various	14 October 2014	Island	Standard/Deluxe edition
