= Passion, Pain & Pleasure =

Studio album by Trey Songz
- Released: September 21, 2010
- Length: 55:50
- Labels: Songbook; Atlantic
- Producers: Troy Taylor; Edrick Miles; John "SK" McGee; Tha Bizness; Swizz Beatz; Kane Beatz; Mario Winans; Jerren "J-Kits" Spruill; Mark "The Mogul" Jackson; Noah "40" Shebib; Bei Maejor; Patrick Hayes; Romeo Taylor; Ezekiel Lewis; Polow da Don

Trey Songz chronology
Ready (2009)	Passion, Pain & Pleasure (2010)	Anticipation II (2011)

Singles from Passion, Pain & Pleasure
- 1. "Bottoms Up" Released: July 27, 2010; 2. "Can't Be Friends" Released: September 28, 2010; 3. "Love Faces" Released: January 11, 2011; 4. "Unusual" Released: May 17, 2011

Passion, Pain & Pleasure is the fourth album by the American R&B recording artist Trey Songz. It was released by Songbook Entertainment and Atlantic Records on September 21, 2010. The album serves as a follow-up to his commercial breakthrough Ready (2009). Production for the album took place from March 2010 to July 2010 and was handled by several record producers, including his mentor Troy Taylor as well as Bryan-Michael Cox, Stargate, Pop & Oak, Bei Maejor, and Mario Winans, among others.

The album debuted at number 2 on the US Billboard 200, selling 240,000 copies in its first week. It has produced two singles, including "Can't Be Friends" and "Bottoms Up". The album was certified Platinum by the Recording Industry Association of America (RIAA), for combined sales and streaming equivalent units of over a million units. Upon its release, Passion, Pain & Pleasure received positive reviews from most music critics. Songz promoted the album via his Summer 2010 tour with R&B singer Monica.

== Promotion ==
=== Singles ===
The album's lead single "Bottoms Up" featuring Nicki Minaj, was released on July 27, 2010. The music video was filmed on July 31, 2010 and was released Tuesday, August 17, 2010 on BET. It has reached at number 2 on the US Billboard Hot R&B/Hip-Hop Songs and at number 6 on the Billboard Hot 100 chart. The album's second single "Can't Be Friends" was released on September 28, 2010. The song produced by Mario Winans and it contains a sample of composer Ryuichi Sakamoto's "Bibo no Aozora" from the score of 2006 drama film Babel. It charted at number 1 on the Billboard Hot R&B/Hip-Hop Songs and at number 43 on the Billboard Hot 100. The music video was filmed and was released on September 7, 2010. "Love Faces" and "Unusual" featuring Drake were released as the third and fourth singles respectively.

=== Leaks ===
In August 2010, the tracks "Love Faces" and "Doorbell" leaked through the internet. On his Ustream.tv channel, Songz expressed his feelings regarding the leaks, stating "Shout out to everybody who didn't listen to the leaks. Bootleggers gotta eat. I ain't mad at y'all boys". In his response, Songz also premiered the track "Massage", a boudior-oriented slow jam about giving a lover a head-to-toe massage that he performs on tour with giving a selected audience member a massage onstage.

== Critical reception ==
Professional ratings
Aggregate scores
Source	Rating
Metacritic	71/100
Review scores
Source	Rating
About.com	3.5/5 stars
Allmusic	4/5 stars
Los Angeles Times	3/4 stars
PopMatters	8/10
Rolling Stone	2/5 stars
The Sydney Morning Herald	2/5 stars
USA Today	3/4 stars

Passion, Pain & Pleasure received positive reviews from most music critics. At Metacritic, which assigns a normalized rating out of 100 to reviews from mainstream critics, the album received an average score of 71, based on five reviews, which indicates "generally favorable reviews". Allmusic writer Andy Kellman gave it four out of five stars and complimented its second half as "the strongest, most varied side of a Trey Songz album, just about flawless. It smoothly shifts through several moods." BBC Online's Mike Diver praised the album's "in-depth descriptions of how our protagonist is going to pleasure his other half" and noted Songz's performance as a strength, stating "The skill is in the execution, in the articulation – and Trey is well studied and blessed with some wonderfully smooth vocals." Sean Fennessey of The Washington Post wrote that the album was "softer and subtler than Ready." Tyler Lewis of PopMatters commented that "Songz rides the tonal and rhythmic shifts with impressive agility" and commended a "clearly rejuvenated songwriting team of Troy Taylor, Edrick Miles, Tony Scales, and Songz himself, who in various combinations wrote the lyrics and melodies to nearly every song here."

In contrast, Rolling Stone writer Will Hermes gave the album two out of five stars and stated "it's just steady mackin' over dull, airbrushed slow-jams." Andrew Murfett of The Sydney Morning Herald expressed a negative response towards its sexual content and stated "Little, if anything, is left to the imagination here." Los Angeles Times writer August Brown viewed that Songz "lacks an especially charismatic voice," but complimented its musical quality and wrote that the album "leaves you like a perfect one night stand — you don't have to remember the person, just the way he or she made you feel." About.com's Mark Edward Nero stated "this album's musical and vocal quality are consistently good from track to track" and concluded "despite the few miscues, this is clearly Trey's most consistent album yet." USA Today's Steve Jones gave the album three out of four stars and stated "his consistent passion makes listening a pleasure."

== Commercial performance ==
Passion, Pain & Pleasure debuted at number two on the US Billboard 200 and number one on the Top R&B/Hip-Hop Albums chart, with first-week sales of 240,000 copies. In its second week, it dropped to number seven on the chart, selling additional 66,000 copies. It held steady at number seven in its third week with 42,000 copies sold, before slipping to number nine in the fourth week, selling 32,000 copies. Elsewhere, Passion, Pain & Pleasure debuted at number 32 on Canada's Top 100 Albums chart. In the United States, it was reached gold status on December 15, 2010 and was eventually certified platinum by the Recording Industry Association of America (RIAA) on July 27, 2016, for combined sales and streaming equivalent units of over a million units. By February 2011, the album had sold 662,000 copies domestically, according to Nielsen SoundScan.

== Track listing ==
Passion, Pain & Pleasure track listing
No.	Title	Writer(s)	Producer(s)	Length
1.	"Here We Go Again (Intro)"	Tremaine Neverson; Troy Taylor	Taylor; Jerren "J-Kits" Spruill	0:40
2.	"Love Faces"	Neverson; T. Taylor; Edrick Miles; Tony Scales	T. Taylor; Miles	4:02
3.	"Massage"	Neverson; T. Taylor; Miles; Scales; John McGee	T. Taylor; $K	4:17
4.	"Alone"	Neverson; T. Taylor; Miles; Scales; Justin Henderson; Christopher Whitacre	Tha Bizness	3:31
5.	"Bottoms Up" (featuring Nicki Minaj)	Neverson; Miles; Scales; Daniel Johnson; Milton James; Onika Maraj	Kane Beatz; The Track Dealer; FKi; Trey Songz	4:00
6.	"Pain" (Interlude)	Neverson; T. Taylor; Miles; Scales; McGee; Frank Brim	T. Taylor; Romeo Taylor	1:26
7.	"Can't Be Friends"	Neverson; T. Taylor; Mario Winans; Michael Jones; Claude Quo Forbes	Winans	3:45
8.	"Please Return My Call"	Neverson; T. Taylor; Mark "The Mogul" Jackson	T. Taylor; Jackson	3:57
9.	"Made to Be Together"	Neverson; T. Taylor; Miles; Scales; Eric Hudson; Andrew "Drew" Clifton	Hudson; Clifton; Songz; T. Taylor	4:28
10.	"Pleasure" (Interlude)	T. Taylor	T. Taylor	1:29
11.	"Red Lipstick"	Neverson; T. Taylor; McGee	T. Taylor; $K	4:00
12.	"Unusual" (featuring Drake)	Neverson; Warren "Oak" Felder; Andrew "Pop" Wansel; Dexter Wansel; Ezekiel Lewis; John Maultsby; Melvin Moore; Floyd Bentley; Aubrey Graham; Noah Shebib	Pop & Oak; D. Wansel; Lewis; Songz; Drake	3:32
13.	"Doorbell"	Neverson; T. Taylor; Miles; Scales; McGee; Brim	T. Taylor; $K; Songz	3:56
14.	"Passion (Interlude)"			1:24
15.	"Unfortunate"	Neverson; Miles; Scales; Shebib	40; Songz	3:49
16.	"Blind"	Neverson; Miles; Scales; Brandon Green	Bei Maejor	4:06
17.	"You Just Need Me"	Neverson; T. Taylor; Miles; Scales; Johnson; Jeremy Coleman	Kane Beatz; JMIKE	3:32

Bonus tracks
No.	Title	Writer(s)	Producer(s)	Length
18.	"Already Taken"	Neverson; Ester Dean; Jamal Jones; Alja Jackson; Jason Perry	Polow Da Don	3:58
19.	"I Like Dat" (featuring Swizz Beatz and T.I.)	Neverson; Kasseem Dean; Clifford Harris, Jr.	Swizz Beatz	3:44

iTunes deluxe version and Japan bonus tracks
No.	Title	Writer(s)	Producer(s)	Length
18.	"Panty Droppa" (The Complete Edition)	Neverson; T. Taylor; Patrick "Guitar Boy" Hayes	T. Taylor; Hayes	3:52
19.	"Love Me Better" (Here We Go Again Complete Edition)	Neverson; T. Taylor; Johnta Austin; Jerren Spruill	T. Taylor; J-Kits	3:39

Notes

- "Can't Be Friends" contains samples of "Bibo No Aozora" performed by Ryuichi Sakamoto.
- "Doorbell" contains elements of "Carol of the Bells", written by Mykola Leontovych and P. Wilhousky.

== Personnel ==
Credits for Passion, Pain & Pleasure adapted from Allmusic.

- Rebecca Alexis – stylist
- Johnta Austin – background vocals, executive producer
- Tanisha Broadwater – production coordination
- Dee Brown – engineer
- Greg Gigendad Burke – art direction, design
- Mike Caren – A&R
- Charles Parker, Jr. – violin
- Mark B. Christensen – mastering
- Andrew Clifton – producer
- Nina Cottman – violin
- Carl Cox, Jr. – flute, tenor saxophone
- Steve Dickey "Rock Star" – engineer
- Wayne Washington – A&R
- Jesus Garnica – assistant
- Sasha Gomez – vocals
- Dionnee Harper – marketing
- Jean-Marie Horvat – vocals, mixing
- Eric Hudson – producer, instrumentation
- J-MIKE – producer
- Mark "the Mogul" Jackson – producer
- Jaycen Joshua – mixing
- Kane Beatz – producer
- Olga Konopelsky – violin
- Emma Kummrow – violin
- Christian Lantry – photography
- Ezekiel Lewis – vocal producer
- Giancarlo Lino – assistant
- Bei Maejor – producer
- Connie Makita – design
- Fabian Marasciullo – mixing
- John McGee – producer, musician
- Donnie Meadows – production coordination
- Edrick Miles – background vocals, lyricist, producer, musician
- Frank Nitty – background vocals
- Adrian "A.J." Nunez – assistant
- Thiago Pinto – engineer
- Zachariah Redding – assistant
- Karen Anna Schubert – French horn
- Noah Shebib – producer
- Stan Slotter – trumpet
- Jerren "J-Kits" Spruill – producer, engineer
- Zach Steele – engineer
- Romeo Taylor – producer, engineer
- Troy Taylor – background vocals, producer, engineer, executive producer, vocal producer, musician
- Gregory Teperman – violin
- Tha Bizness – producer
- Stephen Tirpak – trombone
- Chef Tone – lyricist
- Carolyn Tracey – package production
- The Track Dealer – producer
- Allison Traylor – guitar
- Trey Songz – background vocals, lyricist, engineer, executive producer, vocal producer
- John Walsh – trumpet
- Dexter Wansel – producer
- Mark Ward – cello
- Mario Winans – producer

== Charts ==
=== Weekly charts ===
Weekly chart performance for Passion, Pain & Pleasure
Chart (2010–2011)	Peak position
Australian Urban Albums (ARIA)	1
Belgian Heatseekers Albums (Ultratop Flanders)	9
Belgian Heatseekers Albums (Ultratop Wallonia)	13
Dutch Albums (Album Top 100)	58
French Albums (SNEP)	138
South Korean International Albums (Gaon)	74
UK R&B Albums (Official Charts)	22
US Billboard 200	2
US Top R&B/Hip-Hop Albums (Billboard)	1

=== Year-end charts ===
2010 year-end chart performance for Passion, Pain & Pleasure
Chart (2010)	Position
US Billboard 200	52
US Top R&B/Hip-Hop Albums (Billboard)	17

2011 year-end chart performance for Passion, Pain & Pleasure
Chart (2011)	Position
US Billboard 200	104
US Top R&B/Hip-Hop Albums (Billboard)	24

== Certifications ==
Certifications for Passion, Pain & Pleasure
Region	Certification	Certified units/sales
United States (RIAA)	Platinum	1,000,000^{‡}
^{‡} Sales+streaming figures based on certification alone.

== Release history ==
Release dates and formats for Passion, Pain & Pleasure
Region	Date	Label(s)	Ref.
United States	September 14, 2010	Songbook Entertainment; Atlantic Records	
United Kingdom	November 1, 2010	Atlantic Records	
Germany	March 11, 2011	Atlantic Records	
