= List of number-one R&B/hip-hop songs of 2011 (U.S.) =

The Billboard Hot R&B/Hip-Hop Songs chart ranks the best-performing singles in that category in the United States. The first number one song of the year was claimed by Trey Songz with his song "Can't Be Friends"; it spent the first six weeks of 2011 at number one, and also topped the chart the last seven weeks of 2010, therefore spending 13 weeks atop the chart in total. Drake topped the chart for seven consecutive weeks as a featured artist on two different songs; his collaboration with Jamie Foxx, "Fall for Your Type", spent two consecutive weeks at number one, and was followed by his collaboration with Nicki Minaj, "Moment 4 Life", which topped the chart for five consecutive weeks. Chris Brown's collaboration with Lil Wayne & Busta Rhymes, "Look at Me Now", topped the chart for eight consecutive weeks.

Although Miguel's "Sure Thing" only topped the chart for one week, it ranked as the number one song on Billboard's Hot R&B/Hip-Hop Songs year end list. Kelly Rowland's collaboration with Lil Wayne, "Motivation", topped the chart for seven non-consecutive weeks. "Motivation" ranked at number two on the year end list. DJ Khaled's song "I'm On One", featuring Drake, Rick Ross & Lil Wayne, spent 11 non-consecutive weeks at number one, and was the longest running number one single on the chart in 2011. Big Sean's collaboration with Kanye West & Roscoe Dash, "Marvin & Chardonnay", topped the chart for one week. Lil Wayne's collaboration with Drake, "She Will", peaked at number one for four consecutive weeks. Jay-Z and Kanye West's "Niggas in Paris" topped the chart for seven consecutive weeks. The last number one of 2011 was Wale's collaboration featuring with Miguel, "Lotus Flower Bomb".

== List ==
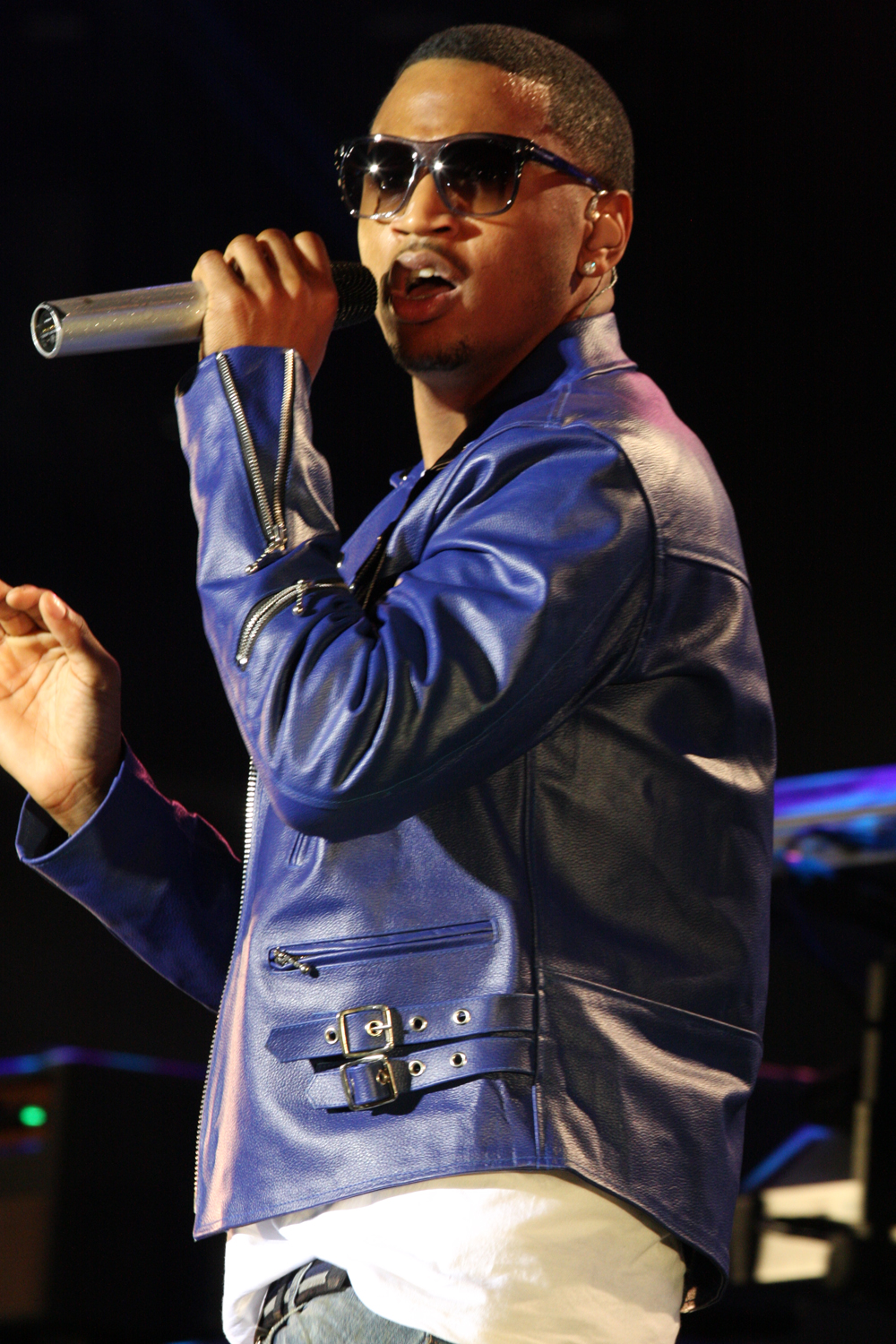
Trey Songz claimed the first number one song on the chart of 2011.

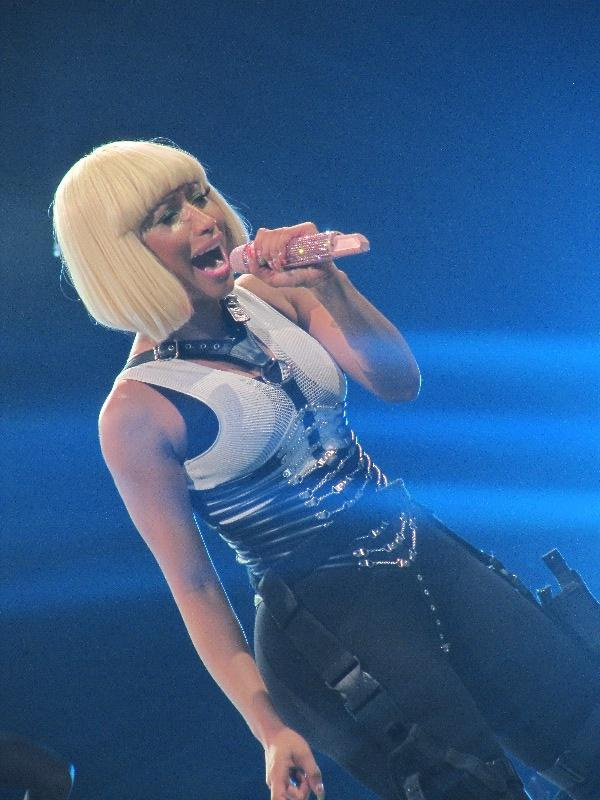
Nicki Minaj's "Moment 4 Life", featuring Drake, topped the chart for five consecutive weeks.

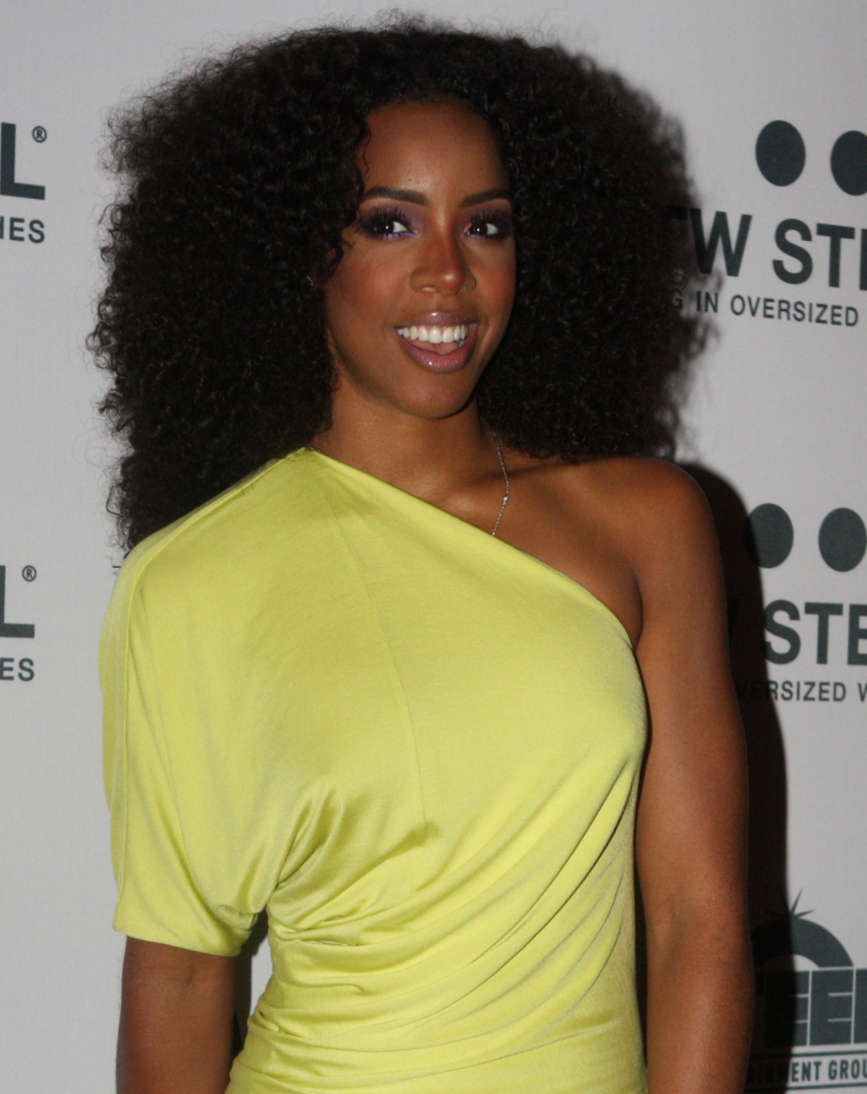
Kelly Rowland's "Motivation", featuring Lil Wayne, topped the chart for seven non-consecutive weeks.

Key
†	Indicates best charting R&B single of 2011; Note: Year-end most popular R&B/Hip-Hop songs, ranked by radio airplay audience impressions as measured by Nielsen BDS and sales data as compiled Nielsen SoundScan

Issue date	Song	Artist(s)	Ref.
January 1	"Can't Be Friends"	Trey Songz	
January 8	"Can't Be Friends"	Trey Songz	
January 15	"Can't Be Friends"	Trey Songz	
January 22	"Can't Be Friends"	Trey Songz	
January 29	"Can't Be Friends"	Trey Songz	
February 5	"Can't Be Friends"	Trey Songz	
February 12	"Fall for Your Type"	Jamie Foxx featuring Drake	
February 19	"Fall for Your Type"	Jamie Foxx featuring Drake	
February 26	"Moment 4 Life"	Nicki Minaj featuring Drake	
March 5	"Moment 4 Life"	Nicki Minaj featuring Drake	
March 12	"Moment 4 Life"	Nicki Minaj featuring Drake	
March 19	"Moment 4 Life"	Nicki Minaj featuring Drake	
March 26	"Moment 4 Life"	Nicki Minaj featuring Drake	
April 2	"Look at Me Now"	Chris Brown featuring Lil Wayne & Busta Rhymes	
April 9	"Look at Me Now"	Chris Brown featuring Lil Wayne & Busta Rhymes	
April 16	"Look at Me Now"	Chris Brown featuring Lil Wayne & Busta Rhymes	
April 23	"Look at Me Now"	Chris Brown featuring Lil Wayne & Busta Rhymes	
April 30	"Look at Me Now"	Chris Brown featuring Lil Wayne & Busta Rhymes	
May 7	"Look at Me Now"	Chris Brown featuring Lil Wayne & Busta Rhymes	
May 14	"Look at Me Now"	Chris Brown featuring Lil Wayne & Busta Rhymes	
May 21	"Look at Me Now"	Chris Brown featuring Lil Wayne & Busta Rhymes	
May 28	"Sure Thing" †	Miguel	
June 4	"Motivation"	Kelly Rowland featuring Lil Wayne	
June 11	"Motivation"	Kelly Rowland featuring Lil Wayne	
June 18	"Motivation"	Kelly Rowland featuring Lil Wayne	
June 25	"Motivation"	Kelly Rowland featuring Lil Wayne	
July 2	"Motivation"	Kelly Rowland featuring Lil Wayne	
July 9	"Motivation"	Kelly Rowland featuring Lil Wayne	
July 16	"I'm On One"	DJ Khaled featuring Drake, Rick Ross & Lil Wayne	
July 23	"Motivation"	Kelly Rowland featuring Lil Wayne	
July 30	"I'm On One"	DJ Khaled featuring Drake, Rick Ross & Lil Wayne	
August 6	"I'm On One"	DJ Khaled featuring Drake, Rick Ross & Lil Wayne	
August 13	"I'm On One"	DJ Khaled featuring Drake, Rick Ross & Lil Wayne	
August 20	"I'm On One"	DJ Khaled featuring Drake, Rick Ross & Lil Wayne	
August 27	"I'm On One"	DJ Khaled featuring Drake, Rick Ross & Lil Wayne	
September 3	"I'm On One"	DJ Khaled featuring Drake, Rick Ross & Lil Wayne	
September 10	"I'm On One"	DJ Khaled featuring Drake, Rick Ross & Lil Wayne	
September 17	"I'm On One"	DJ Khaled featuring Drake, Rick Ross & Lil Wayne	
September 24	"I'm On One"	DJ Khaled featuring Drake, Rick Ross & Lil Wayne	
October 1	"I'm On One"	DJ Khaled featuring Drake, Rick Ross & Lil Wayne	
October 8	"Marvin & Chardonnay"	Big Sean featuring Kanye West & Roscoe Dash	
October 15	"She Will"	Lil Wayne featuring Drake	
October 22	"She Will"	Lil Wayne featuring Drake	
October 29	"She Will"	Lil Wayne featuring Drake	
November 5	"She Will"	Lil Wayne featuring Drake	
November 12	"Niggas in Paris"	Jay-Z and Kanye West	
November 19	"Niggas in Paris"	Jay-Z and Kanye West	
November 26	"Niggas in Paris"	Jay-Z and Kanye West	
December 3	"Niggas in Paris"	Jay-Z and Kanye West	
December 10	"Niggas in Paris"	Jay-Z and Kanye West	
December 17	"Niggas in Paris"	Jay-Z and Kanye West	
December 24	"Niggas in Paris"	Jay-Z and Kanye West	
December 31	"Lotus Flower Bomb"	Wale featuring Miguel	

== See also ==
- 2011 in music
- Billboard Year-End Hot R&B/Hip-Hop Songs of 2011
- List of number-one rhythm and blues hits (United States)
