= It's Real (By All Means album) =

Studio album by By All Means
- Released: 1992
- Genre: Soul; R&B
- Length: 51:58
- Label: Motown
- Producer: Jimmy Varner, Stan Sheppard

By All Means chronology
Beyond a Dream (1989)	It's Real (1992)

Professional ratings
Review scores
Source	Rating
AllMusic	link

It's Real is the third and final album by American music group By All Means, released in 1992 on Motown. The album includes the hits "Love Lies" and "Say You'll Never Leave Me", as well as the group's final American hit, "The Feeling I Get".

== Track listing ==
#	Title	Writer(s)	Length
1.	"Love Lies"	Jimmy Varner/Stan Sheppard	7:35
2.	"The Feeling I Get"	Jimmy Varner/Lynn Roderick	6:28
3.	"Don't Change"	Billy Sheppard/Jimmy Varner/Stan Sheppard	4:39
4.	"Tonight"	Jimmy Varner/Stan Sheppard	5:04
5.	"Ain't Nothing Like the Real Thing"	Nickolas Ashford/Valerie Simpson	4:27
6.	"In Your Arms"	Jimmy Varner	4:51
7.	"I Wanna Be Loved"	Lynn Roderick	5:09
8.	"Say You'll Never Leave Me"	Jimmy Varner/Lynn Roderick	5:08
9.	"Never Give Up"	Jimmy Varner	4:04
10.	"Hello Goodbye"	Jimmy Varner/Lynn Roderick	4:32
