= Pop & Oak =

American R&B duo

- Genres: R&B; hip hop; soul; pop
- Occupations: Songwriters; producers
- Years active: 2005–present
- Members: Andrew (Pop) Wansel; Warren (Oak) Felder

Pop & Oak is a songwriting and production duo consisting of Andrew "Pop" Wansel and Warren "Oak" Felder. Wansel is the son of Dexter Wansel, staff songwriter, producer and session musician of Gamble and Huff's Philadelphia International Records.

== Life and careers ==
Pop and Oak began producing music together as The Knightwritaz after their shared manager at the time suggested they work together. They shortly after started to become known as Pop & Oak. Oak described the day he met Pop was a red letter day and their partnership exposed him to hip-hop for the first time. Their first production of visibility was Ashley Tisdale's "Hair" from her 2009 album, Guilty Pleasure.

== Production style ==
The pair use a hands on style while working with artists, hoping to avoid a reputation of only being "beat-makers." Pop's style is more focused on rap with beats and bass, while Oak has a more "melodic" background in musical composition, pop and R&B.

== Production discography ==
Year	Artist(s)	Album	Song
2009	Ashley Tisdale	Guilty Pleasure	"Hair"
2009	Ginuwine	A Man's Thoughts	"Orchestra"
2009	Ginuwine	A Man's Thoughts	"Show Off"
2009	Ginuwine	A Man's Thoughts	"Open the Door"
2010	Fantasia	Back to Me	"Collard Greens & Cornbread"
2010	Trey Songz	Passion, Pain & Pleasure	"Unusual" (featuring Drake)
2010	Nicki Minaj	Pink Friday	"Muny"
2010	Nicki Minaj	Pink Friday	"Save Me"
2010	Nicki Minaj	Pink Friday	"Your Love"
2012	Diggy	Unexpected Arrival	"Do It Like You" (featuring Jeremih)
2012	Diggy	Unexpected Arrival	"The Reign"
2012	Diggy	Unexpected Arrival	"Copy, Paste"
2012	Monica	New Life	"Catch Me
2012	Elle Varner	Perfectly Imperfect	"Only Wanna Give It to You" (featuring J. Cole)
2012	Elle Varner	Perfectly Imperfect	"Sound Proof Room"
2012	Elle Varner	Perfectly Imperfect	"I Don't Care"
2012	Elle Varner	Perfectly Imperfect	"Not Tonight"
2012	Elle Varner	Perfectly Imperfect	"Leaf"
2012	Elle Varner	Perfectly Imperfect	"So Fly"
2012	Busta Rhymes	Year of the Dragon	"Pressure" (featuring Lil Wayne)
2012	Miguel	Kaleidoscope Dream	"Use Me"
2012	Miguel	Kaleidoscope Dream	"Where's the Fun in Forever"
2012	Rihanna	Unapologetic	"Numb" (featuring Eminem)
2012	Alicia Keys	Girl on Fire	"Fire We Make" (duet with Maxwell)
2012	Alicia Keys	Girl on Fire	"Limitedless"
2013	Chrisette Michele	Better	"A Couple of Forevers"
2013	Chrisette Michele	Better	"Snow"
2013	K. Michelle	Rebellious Soul	"V.S.O.P."
2014	Usher	Non-album single	"Good Kisser"
2014	Ariana Grande	My Everything	"Break Your Heart Right Back"
2014	Azealia Banks	Broke with Expensive Taste	"Chasing Time"
2014	Jennifer Lopez	A.K.A.	"Troubeaux" (featuring Nas)
2014	Jessie J	Sweet Talker	"Seal Me with a Kiss" (featuring De La Soul)
2014	K. Michelle	Anybody Wanna Buy a Heart?	"Going Under"
2014	Omarion	Sex Playlist	"You Like It"
2015	Jason Derulo	Everything Is 4	"Trade Hearts" (featuring Julia Michaels)
2015	Miguel	Wildheart	"DEAL"
2015	Miguel	Wildheart	"leaves"
2015	Prince Royce	Double Vision	"Getaway"
2015	Tamia	Love Life	"Love Falls Over Me"
2015	Tamia	Love Life	"Sandwich and a Soda"
2015	Alessia Cara	Four Pink Walls / Know-It-All	"Seventeen"
2015	Alessia Cara	Four Pink Walls / Know-It-All	"Here"
2015	Alessia Cara	Four Pink Walls / Know-It-All	"Outlaws"
2015	Alessia Cara	Four Pink Walls / Know-It-All	"I'm Yours"
2015	Alessia Cara	Four Pink Walls / Know-It-All	"Four Pink Walls"
2015	Alessia Cara	Four Pink Walls / Know-It-All	"Overdose"
2015	Alessia Cara	Four Pink Walls / Know-It-All	"Scars To Your Beautiful"
2015	Fleur East	Love, Sax and Flashbacks	"Over Getting Over"
2015	Fleur East	Love, Sax and Flashbacks	"Never Say When"
2015	Monica	Code Red	"Alone In Your Heart"
2016	Brandy	Non-album single	"Beggin & Pleadin"
2016	K. Michelle	More Issues Than Vogue	"Sleep Like A Baby"
2016	Bea Miller	Non-album single	"Yes Girl"
2017	Kehlani	SweetSexySavage	"Distraction"
2017	Kehlani	SweetSexySavage	"Advice"
2017	Kehlani	SweetSexySavage	"Peace of Mind"
2017	Kehlani	SweetSexySavage	"Not Used to It"
2017	Kehlani	SweetSexySavage	"Everything Is Yours"
2017	Kehlani	SweetSexySavage	"Escape"
2017	Kehlani	SweetSexySavage	"In My Feelings"
2017	Kehlani	SweetSexySavage	"Hold Me By The Heart"
2017	Kehlani	SweetSexySavage	"Thank You"
2017	Betty Who	The Valley	"Some Kinda Wonderful"
2017	Miguel	Non-album single	"Shockandawe"
2018	Alessia Cara	The Pains of Growing	"Growing Pains"
2018	Alessia Cara	The Pains of Growing	"Trust My Lonely"
2018	Alessia Cara	The Pains of Growing	"7 Days"
2018	Alessia Cara	The Pains of Growing	"All We Know"
2018	Alessia Cara	The Pains of Growing	"Easier Said"
2021	Demi Lovato	Dancing with the Devil... the Art of Starting Over	"My Girlfriends are My Boyfriend" (featuring Saweetie)
2021	Demi Lovato	Non-album single	"Unforgettable (Tommy's Song)"
