= Prima J (album) =

Studio album by Prima J
- Released: June 17, 2008
- Recorded: 2007–2008
- Genre: Latin pop; hip hop; R&B
- Length: 44:00
- Label: Geffen
- Producer: Madd Scientist; SAK PASE; JR Rotem; Oak Felder; Troy NōKa; Jim Jonsin; Beau Dozier; John Frazier Jr.; Happy Perez; Rock City

Singles from Prima J
- 1. "Rock Star" Released: 2007; 2. "Nadie (No One)" Released: 2007; 3. "Corazón (You're Not Alone)" Released: 2008

Professional ratings
Review scores
Source	Rating
AllMusic	2.5/5 stars
Okayplayer	(70/100)

Prima J is the self-titled debut and only album from American duo Prima J. It was released on June 17, 2008. It features 13 tracks, including the singles "Rockstar", "Nadie (No One)" and "Corazón (You're Not Alone)".

The album spent one week on the Billboard 200 album chart at number 172 in July 2008, but peaked at number six on the Billboard Top Heatseekers Albums chart, spending nine weeks on the chart.

== Track listing ==
No.	Title	Writer(s)	Producer(s)	Length
1.	"Corazón (You're Not Alone)"	Janelle Amber Martinez; Jessica Marie Martinez; Stefanie Ridel; Ronald Bryant; Nathan Perez	Happy Perez	3:07
2.	"Leftovers"	J. A. Martinez; J. M. Martinez; Shaliek Rivers; Rashaun Ashley; Elvis Williams; Jamie Newman	Blac Elvis; J-New	3:14
3.	"Tame"	Richard Bulter Jr.; John A. Crawford; Beau Dozier; James Scheffer	Jim Jonsin	3:49
4.	"Flip the Script"	Dozier; Ridel	Dozier	3:41
5.	"Homework"	J. A. Martinez; J. M. Martinez; Ridel; Damon Crawford; Ishmael Ferguson; Corey Williams	The Dope Squad; Ron Fair	3:23
6.	"Girlfriend"	Anna Wright; James Champion; Theodore Thomas	Madd Scientist	3:08
7.	"Inside Out"	Mischke J Butler; Ridel; Antwoine Collins	Troy NōKa	3:13
8.	"Boom"	J. A. Martinez; J. M. Martinez; Ridel; Jonathan Rotem; Elena Cager; Lawrence Davis; Rachel DeRougemont; Paul Klein; Joseph Stone	J.R. Rotem	3:13
9.	"Chilosa"	J. A. Martinez; J. M. Martinez; Ridel; Warren Felder	Oak	2:59
10.	"Nadie (No One)"	Alicia Keys; Kerry Brothers Jr; George Harry	Fair	3:28
11.	"Infatuated"	Theron Makiel Thomas; Timothy Jamahli Thomas	Madd Scientist	4:14
12.	"Go Hard"	J. A. Martinez; J. M. Martinez; Bob Merrill; Dozier	Dozier	3:21
13.	"Rockstar (Unedited Version)"	T. M. Thomas; T. J. Thomas; Maurice Simmonds; James Bunton; Corror Cole; Shama Joseph	SAK PASE; The Movement	3:36

Bonus Track(s)
No.	Title	Writer(s)	Producer(s)	Length
14.	"Corazón (You're Not Alone) (Spanish version) [iTunes bonus track]"	J. A. Martinez; J. M. Martinez; Ridel; Bryant; Perez	Perez	3:06
15.	"Take It To The Maximum"	M. J. Bulter; Ridel; John Fasse; Nicolas Scapa	Fasse & Scapa	2:56

== Singles ==
- "Rockstar" – Originally released on the soundtrack of Bratz: The Movie. It spent 1 week on the Billboard Pop 100 chart, peaking at No. 93
- "Nadie (No One)" – peaked at No.1 On Billboard's Dance Singles Chart.
- "Corazón (You're Not Alone)" – Spent 1 week on the Billboard Pop 100 and peaked at No. 99.

== Production credits ==
- Happy Perez – track 1
- Jim Jonsin – track 3
- Beau Dozier – track 4, 12
- John Frazier Jr. – track 5
- J. R. Rotem – track 8
- Oak Felder – track 9
- Troy NōKa – track 7
- Madd Scientist – track 6, 11
- Shama "Sak Pase" Joseph – track 13

== Credits ==
- Aaron Ahl- Engineer
- Giuliano Bekor- Photography
- Anthony Burrise- Illustrations
- Anthony Caruso- Assistant Engineer
- Antwoine "Troy NōKa" Collins - Producer
- Daniel Crawford- Keyboards
- Beau Dozier- Producer, Vocal Producer
- Mike "Angry" Eleopoulos- Engineer, Vocal Tracking
- Ron Fair- Conductor, Keyboards, Producer, Executive Producer, String Arrangements, Vocal Producer, String Conductor
- Joe Francis- Gonzales Engineer
- Erica Grayson- A&R
- Bernie Grundman- Mastering
- Jorge Hernández- Personal Manager
- Tal Herzberg- Digital Editing
- Mike Hogue- Assistant Engineer
- Bruce Johnson- Personal Manager
- Jim Jonsin- Producer
- Ryan Kennedy- Engineer
- Drea LaVelle- Engineer
- Rico Love- Vocals
- Peter Mokran- Mixing
- The Movement- Producer
- Oak- Producer
- Greg Ogan- Engineer
- Dave Pensado- Mixing
- Happy Perez- Producer
- Stefanie Ridel- Executive Producer, Vocal Producer
- Chad Rober- Engineer
- J.R. Rotem- Producer, Vocal Producer
- Lasette Smith- Spanish Translation, Vocal Producer
- Allen Smith- Spanish Translation, Vocal Producer
- Terry "Mad Scientist" Thomas- Producer, Engineer, Vocal Producer
- Eric Weaver- Mixing Assistant
- Elvis "Black Elvis" Williams- Producer
- Andrew Wuepper- Mixing Assistant

== Charts ==
Chart (2008)	Peak position
US Billboard 200	172
US Top Heatseekers (Billboard)	6
