= Beyond a Dream (By All Means album) =

Studio album by By All Means
- Released: 1989
- Genre: Soul, R&B
- Length: 46:57
- Label: Island
- Producer: Jimmy Varner, Stan Sheppard

By All Means chronology
By All Means (1988)	Beyond a Dream (1989)	It's Real (1992)

Professional ratings
Review scores
Source	Rating
AllMusic	link

Beyond a Dream is the second album by American music group By All Means, released in 1989 on Island Records. The album includes the hits "Let's Get It On" and "Do You Remember".

== Track listing ==
#	Title	Writer(s)	Length
1.	"Let's Get It On"	Ed Townsend/Marvin Gaye	4:47
2.	"Do You Remember"	Billy Sheppard/Jimmy Varner/Lynn Roderick	3:55
3.	"Early Fall"	Jimmy Varner/Lynn Roderick/Stan Sheppard	4:09
4.	"Tender Love"	Billy Sheppard/Jimmy Varner/Lynn Roderick	5:20
5.	"I Think I Fell in Love"	Jimmy Varner/Stan Sheppard/Terry Carter	5:50
6.	"Stay with Me Tonight"	C. Buckingham/Jimmy Varner	5:20
7.	"Point of View"	Billy Sheppard/Jimmy Varner/Lynn Roderick	4:26
8.	"I'd Rather Be Lonely"	Billy Sheppard/Jimmy Varner/Lynn Roderick	5:11
9.	"The More You Give, the More You Get"	Billy Sheppard/Jimmy Varner/Lynn Roderick	4:01
10.	"I Know You Well"	Billy Sheppard/Jimmy Varner/Lynn Roderick	4:12
