= I Don't Care (Elle Varner song) =

Single by Elle Varner

from the album Perfectly Imperfect
- Released: July 16, 2012 (airplay)
- Recorded: 2012
- Genre: R&B, neo soul, downtempo
- Length: 3:06
- Label: RCA Records
- Songwriters: Gabrielle Varner, Warren "Oak" Felder, Andrew "Pop" Wansel
- Producer: Pop & Oak

Elle Varner singles chronology
"Refill" (2012)	"I Don't Care" (2012)	"Oh What a Night" (2012)

"I Don't Care" is a song by American singer-songwriter and R&B recording artist Elle Varner. The song was produced by Pop & Oak, and serves as the third single from her debut studio album, Perfectly Imperfect (2012). The music video was directed by Lenny Bass.

This song features a sample from the song "Little Children" by Kool & the Gang & Sincerity by Mary J. Blige feat. DMX, Nas

== Charts ==
Chart (2012)	Peak position
US Hot R&B/Hip-Hop Songs (Billboard)	53
