= Love Faces =

Single by Trey Songz

from the album Passion, Pain & Pleasure
- Released: January 11, 2011
- Recorded: 2010
- Genre: R&B
- Length: 4:03
- Label: Songbook, Atlantic
- Songwriters: Tremaine Neverson, Troy Taylor, Edrick Miles, Tony Scales
- Producers: Troy Taylor, Edrick Miles

Trey Songz singles chronology
"Can't Be Friends" (2010)	"Love Faces" (2011)	"Unusual" (2011)

"Love Faces" is a song by American recording artist Trey Songz. It was released on January 11, 2011, as the third single from his fourth studio album, Passion, Pain & Pleasure (2010). Written by Songz with Tony Scales, Troy Taylor and Edrick Miles, and produced by the latter two, "Love Faces" is a mid-tempo ballad and uses the piano as its foundation. Beginning with a spoken introduction, the song discusses facial expressions during sexual intercourse.

"Love Faces" received a mixed response from critics, and reached number sixty-three on the Billboard Hot 100 and number three on the Hot R&B/Hip-Hop Songs, becoming Songz' tenth top-five hit on the latter chart. An accompanying music video for the single was co-directed by Songz and Justin Francis, and follows Songz's girlfriend's art opening, where the two pretend not to know each other. Songz performed the track on The Wendy Williams Show and his Love Faces Tour.

== Background and composition ==
"Love Faces"
A sample of the song, demonstrating its piano foundation

"Love Faces" was written by Trey Songz along with Tony Scales, Troy Taylor and Edrick Miles, while Taylor and Miles produced the track. Songz said of the tune's conception, "I'm sure any man can relate when you look at a beautiful woman and you imagine those things, and I'm sure [women] do those things too when they get into that mental frame when looking at someone. So I thought it would be a great concept: Beautiful women make beautiful faces when they making love." "Love Faces" revolves around facial expressions that people make when having sexual intercourse. The song is a mid-tempo slow jam piano-based ballad. It opens with Songz speaking, "When I met you woman, I couldn't help but notice a face so beautiful. I imagined the faces you would make if we ever made love." Prior to the release of Passion, Pain & Pleasure in September 2010, "Love Faces" was leaked online.

== Release and reception ==
"Love Faces" was sent to urban radio on January 11, 2011, as the third single from the album. A writer for The Washington Post noted "Love Faces" as one of the best tracks from Passion, Pain & Pleasure. Kyle Jarmon from Parlé Magazine commended Songz' vocals and the tune's R. Kelly-reminiscent sound. Mark Edward Nero of About.com described "Love Faces" as a "bump-n-grind anthem", writing that Songz' lovemaking songs are his best work. Tyler Lewis of PopMatters was impressed by Songz' vocals on and the melody of "Love Faces". BBC Music's Mike Diver praised the "silken" production on the tune, however David Hayter of 411mania.com criticized the song's production for being too heavy and destroying the song's mood, while calling the backing vocals "laughable". Idolator's Becky Bain negatively reviewed "Love Faces", dubbing it a "supremely generic love track".

"Love Faces" debuted at number one hundred on the United States Billboard Hot 100 chart dated March 12, 2011, and peaked at number sixty-three, spending fourteen weeks on the chart. On the Hot R&B/Hip-Hop Songs, the song debuted at number seventy-nine on January 1, 2011, and reached number three, becoming Songz' tenth song to reach the top five of that chart. It spent a total of thirty-six weeks on the R&B/Hip-Hop Songs.

== Music video ==
An accompanying music video for "Love Faces" was directed by Justin Francis and Songz and was shot in two days in Miami. The video premiered on MTV.com on February 14, 2011, after a preview was released on February 10. Songz said of the clip, "I love the treatment so much. I think it's gonna be a lot different than what people expect it to be and a lot of that is contributed to the narrative, and I want people to be surprised when they see it." The video is in black-and-white, except for Songz' solo scenes and the art centrepiece. It opens with Songz and his girlfriend having a telephone conversation about her art show that evening. She requests that they arrive at the gallery separately, and pretend that they do not know each other so that she may be judged by her artistic work, not who she is dating. Songz drops her off in a convertible Mercedes-Benz before arriving himself later. Songz inspects some paintings before being "introduced" to his girlfriend. The clip ends with Songz and his girlfriend placing their hand prints on the artwork. Chris Ryan from MTV lauded the "mood, feeling, vibe and atmosphere" of the music video.

== Live performances ==
Songz and Drake performed at the Best Buy Theater, New York on October 5, 2010, to promote Kodak's "So Kodak" promotional campaign. Songz performed "I Invented Sex", "Say Aah", "Neighbors Know My Name", Can't Be Friends", "Bottoms Up" and "Love Faces". On February 10, 2011, Songz performed "Love Faces" on The Wendy Williams Show.

== Charts ==
=== Weekly charts ===
Chart (2011)	Peak position
US Billboard Hot 100	63
US Hot R&B/Hip-Hop Songs (Billboard)	3
US Rhythmic Airplay (Billboard)	34

=== Year-end charts ===
Chart (2011)	Position
US Hot R&B/Hip-Hop Songs (Billboard)	14

== Certifications ==
Region	Certification	Certified units/sales
United States (RIAA)	Platinum	1,000,000^{‡}
^{‡} Sales+streaming figures based on certification alone.
