= Billboard Year-End Hot Rap Songs of 2011 =

American music chart

This is a list of Billboard magazine's Top Hot Rap Songs of 2011.

No.	Title	Artist(s)
1	"Look at Me Now"	Chris Brown featuring Lil Wayne and Busta Rhymes
2	"I'm on One"	DJ Khaled featuring Rick Ross, Drake and Lil Wayne
3	"No Hands"	Waka Flocka Flame featuring Roscoe Dash and Wale
4	"Moment 4 Life"	Nicki Minaj featuring Drake
5	"My Last"	Big Sean featuring Chris Brown
6	"All of the Lights"	Kanye West
7	"6 Foot 7 Foot"	Lil Wayne featuring Cory Gunz
8	"Give Me Everything"	Pitbull featuring Ne-Yo, Afrojack and Nayer
9	"Super Bass"	Nicki Minaj
10	"Aston Martin Music"	Rick Ross featuring Drake and Chrisette Michele
11	"Black and Yellow"	Wiz Khalifa
12	"Party Rock Anthem"	LMFAO featuring Lauren Bennett and GoonRock
13	"Roll Up"	Wiz Khalifa
14	"Headlines"	Drake
15	"The Show Goes On"	Lupe Fiasco
16	"Out of My Head"	Lupe Fiasco featuring Trey Songz
17	"You Be Killin Em"	Fabolous
18	"She Will"	Lil Wayne featuring Drake
19	"Marvin & Chardonnay"	Big Sean featuring Kanye West and Roscoe Dash
20	"Right Above It"	Lil Wayne featuring Drake
21	"Otis"	Jay-Z and Kanye West featuring Otis Redding
22	"Lighters"	Bad Meets Evil featuring Bruno Mars
23	"Did It On'em"	Nicki Minaj
24	"Racks"	YC featuring Future
25	"Niggas in Paris"	Jay-Z and Kanye West

== See also ==
- 2011 in music
- Billboard Year-End Hot 100 singles of 2011
- Billboard Year-End Hot R&B/Hip-Hop Songs of 2011
- List of Billboard number-one rap singles of 2011
