= Only Wanna Give It to You =

Single by Elle Varner featuring J. Cole

from the album Perfectly Imperfect
- Released: August 16, 2011
- Recorded: 2011
- Genre: R&B; hip-hop soul
- Length: 3:58
- Label: J
- Songwriters: Elle Varner; Jermaine Lamarr Cole; Warren "Oak" Felder; Andrew "Pop" Wansel
- Producer: Pop & Oak

Elle Varner singles chronology
| "Only Wanna Give It to You" (2011) | "Refill" (2012) |

J. Cole singles chronology
| "Trouble" (2011) | "Only Wanna Give It to You" (2011) | "Can't Get Enough" (2011) |

Music video
- "Only Wanna Give It to You" on YouTube

"Only Wanna Give It to You" is a song by American singer-songwriter and R&B recording artist Elle Varner, released on August 16, 2011 as a digital download. It serves as her debut single and the lead single from her debut studio album, Perfectly Imperfect (2012). The song features American rapper J. Cole and was produced by Oak & Pop. The Elle Varner song was released and her only single with J Records prior to RCA Records before closing down the label.

== Background ==
On October 4, 2011, Varner appeared on BET's 106 & Park to premier the video for "Only Wanna Give It to You". While she was there she was asked how the J. Cole collaboration came to be, she explained: "We actually met in college. He went to St. John's and we had a mutual friend at my school and like two years later I saw him in the Sony building when I had just got signed and I bumped into him I was like 'Yo what's up what are you doing here?' and he's like 'Yo I just signed with Roc Nation' and I"m like 'Yo I just signed with J. Records… When it came time to do the lead single for my album he was the first person I thought of."

== Reception ==
=== Critical response ===
DJBooth.net compared the song to Mary J. Blige and Method Man's 1995 hit "I'll Be There for You/You're All I Need to Get By". They give praise to the Oak & Pop heavily influenced beat and Varner's vocals stating "Varner puts her distinctly unique voice on full display, laying down charismatic vocals declaring that she loves her man even more than her shoes".

== Music video ==
The music video, directed by Orson Whales, was filmed in New York City. On October 3, behind-the-scene photos surfaced onto the Internet. The video depicts the 22-year-old singer-songwriter shop for shoes, chase her leading man, cruise with her girlfriends in her yellow Jeep Wrangler, and appear with J. Cole as he raps his verse in the vibrant visuals. The video also featured a new and up-and-coming group called the "Tribe NYC", which is a collective group of talents who also pays homage to the late 1980s early 90s with their style. The video was released October 4, 2011, with Varner premiering it on BET's 106 & Park later that day.

== Chart performance ==
The song first charted on the week of September 5, 2011 on the Hot R&B/Hip-Hop Songs at number ninety-four. It has since peaked at number twenty. In South Korea, "Only Wanna Give It to You" sold 25,058 units in 2011.

=== Charts ===
| Chart (2011–12) | Peak position |
|---|---|
| Japan (Japan Hot 100) | 23 |
| South Korea International (Circle) | 53 |
| US Hot R&B/Hip-Hop Songs (Billboard) | 20 |

== Release Information ==
=== Purchasable Release ===
| Country | Date | Format | Label | Ref |
|---|---|---|---|---|
| United States | August 16, 2011 | Digital download | J Records | |
