= Unusual (song) =

Single by Trey Songz featuring Drake

from the album Passion, Pain & Pleasure
- Released: May 17, 2011 (U.S. urban radio)
- Recorded: 2010
- Genre: R&B
- Length: 3:32
- Label: Songbook; Atlantic
- Songwriters: Tremaine Neverson; Aubrey Graham; Andrew "Pop" Wansel; Warren "Oak" Felder; Dexter Wansel; Ezekiel Lewis; John Maultsby; Melvin Moore; Floyd Bentley
- Producers: Pop & Oak; Dexter Wansel; Ezekiel Lewis; Drake

Trey Songz singles chronology
| "Love Faces" (2011) | "Unusual" (2011) | "Heart Attack" (2012) |

Drake singles chronology
| "I'm on One" (2010) | "Unusual" (2010) | "Headlines" (2011) |

"Unusual" is a song by American recording artist Trey Songz, released as the fourth official single from his fourth studio album, Passion, Pain & Pleasure (2010). featuring Drake. It is produced by Pop & Oak, Dexter Wansel, Ezekiel Lewis and Drake.

== Writing and composition ==
The horns, strings, guitar, were originally recorded by Pop's father Dexter with the intention of being used for samples in new recordings. Pop then chopped and sampled from those recordings. The beat was intended to be given to Kanye West but Mike Caren an A&R at Atlantic Records received it and had the idea of creating an R&B record to it.

== Release and reception ==
"Unusual" was sent by Atlantic Records and Songbook for urban contemporary airplay on May 17, 2011. The song debuted at number eighty-five on the US Hot R&B/Hip-Hop Songs chart dated October 16, 2010, and went on to peak at forty-eight Upon release, "Unusual" re-entered the chart at ten and has since peaked at number seven on the R&B chart in its twenty-fourth charting week. It also debuted at #90 on the Billboard Hot 100 and has reached a current peak of #68.

== Charts ==
=== Weekly charts ===
| Chart (2011) | Peak position |
|---|---|
| US Billboard Hot 100 | 68 |
| US Hot R&B/Hip-Hop Songs (Billboard) | 7 |
| US Rhythmic Airplay (Billboard) | 24 |

=== Year-end charts ===
| Chart (2011) | Position |
|---|---|
| US Hot R&B/Hip-Hop Songs (Billboard) | 31 |
