= Okay (name) =

Okay (pronounced [okaj]) is a Turkish masculine given name and surname. Notable people with the name include:

== Given name ==
- Okay Arpa (born 1977), Turkish karateka
- Okay Gönensin (1950–2017), Turkish journalist
- Okay Temiz (born 1939), Turkish jazz musician
- Okay Yokuşlu (born 1994), Turkish footballer

== Surname ==
- Meral Okay (1959–2012), Turkish actress
- Yaman Okay (1951–1993), Turkish actor
