= Refill (song) =

2012 single by Elle Varner

Single by Elle Varner

from the album Perfectly Imperfect
- Released: January 31, 2012
- Recorded: 2011
- Genre: Neotraditional country, R&B
- Length: 4:00
- Label: RCA Records
- Songwriters: Elle Varner; Andrew "Pop" Wansel; Darrhyl Camper
- Producer: Pop

Elle Varner singles chronology
"Only Wanna Give It to You" (2011)	"Refill" (2012)	"I Don't Care" (2012)

Music video
- "Refill" on YouTube

"Refill" is a song by American singer-songwriter and R&B recording artist Elle Varner. The song, produced by Andrew "Pop" Wansel, was released on January 31, 2012 as a digital download, and serves as the second single from her debut studio album, Perfectly Imperfect (2012). A snippet of the song was included on her mixtape Conversational Lush (2012). The song received a nomination for Best R&B Song at the 55th Grammy Awards, losing to "Adorn" by Miguel. Robert Christgau ranked it number 14 on his year-end singles list for 2012.

== Music video ==
The music video, directed by Constellation Jones, was released March 27, 2012 via Varner's official VEVO account on YouTube. The video features Varner taking a trip to New York City with her cheerleading squad. During her last night in NYC, she sneaks out to explore, running into a man (Jeantique Oriol) who shows her around town. She races back to make the bus, but not before getting his number, which is ripped in half as the bus keeps moving.

== Remix ==
The official remix features Kirko Bangz and T-Pain was released on June 1, 2012. Another remix features Wale and T-Pain. There is also an extended remix made by DJ Unique featuring all 3 rappers.

== Chart performance ==
The song first charted on the week of March 5, 2012 on the Hot R&B/Hip-Hop Songs at number seventy-eight. It has since peaked at number ten.

== Charts ==
=== Weekly charts ===
Chart (2012)	Peak position
US Billboard Bubbling Under Hot 100 Singles	1
US Hot R&B/Hip-Hop Songs (Billboard)	10
US Radio Songs (Billboard)	71
US Top Heatseekers (Billboard)	15

=== Year-end charts ===
Chart (2012)	Position
US Hot R&B/Hip-Hop Songs (Billboard)	47

== Release information ==
=== Purchasable release ===
Version	Country	Date	Format	Label
Original	United States	January 31, 2012	Digital download	RCA Records
Version	Country	Date	Format	Label
Remix	United States	June 1, 2012	Digital download	RCA Records
