= Perfectly Imperfect (Elle Varner album) =

Studio album by Elle Varner
- Released: August 7, 2012
- Recorded: 2011–12
- Genre: R&B
- Label: RCA
- Producers: Al Shux; DJ Camper; Dexter Wansel; Jimmy Varner; Pop & Oak; Pop Wansel; Steve Mostyn; The Chess Klub; The Varners

Elle Varner chronology
Conversational Lush (2012)	Perfectly Imperfect (2012)	Ellevation (2019)

Singles from Perfectly Imperfect
- 1. "Only Wanna Give It to You" Released: August 16, 2011; 2. "Refill" Released: January 31, 2012; 3. "I Don't Care" Released: July 16, 2012; 4. "Oh What a Night" Released: August 3, 2012

Perfectly Imperfect is the debut studio album by American singer-songwriter Elle Varner. It was released on August 7, 2012, under RCA and MBK Entertainment. Recording sessions for the album took place at Jungle City Studios in New York City, Soulstar Studios in Brooklyn, Larrabee Sound Studio in North Hollywood, and Skip Saylor Studios in Northridge, California. For the production of the album Varner enlisted writers and producers including J. Cole, Pop & Oak, Frankie Storm, and Darhyl Camper.

Three singles preceded the album's release, "Only Wanna Give It to You", featuring American rapper J. Cole, "Refill", released on January 31, 2012, and "I Don't Care", released on July 16, 2012.

== Background ==
At the age of 16, Varner picked up the guitar for the first time. Frustrated that she was not instantly successful, she dropped the guitar and became a part of Alexander Hamilton High School's Academy of Music's Vocal Jazz Group. Once there, she learned about the complexity of the voice, jazz music and talented jazz artists Ella Fitzgerald. Varner was surprised to discover, she had been chosen to be a part of The Grammy in the Schools Mentoring Program. Through this program she was taken weekly to the Fox Studio, where she met with mentor Kelly Burgos, and President of Fox Music, Robert Kraft. With that, Varner applied to NYU and was accepted. Not only did she get in, but also she was admitted into the second class of the Clive Davis Department of Recorded Music. Upon graduating, she was awarded "most likely to get signed" and "most likely to win a Grammy." Four years later, she finds herself a well-rounded and cultured singer-songwriter. In 2008, Varner graduated from NYU's renowned Clive Davis Department of Recorded Music.

In October 2009, she signed with MBK/J-RCA Records, along with a co-publishing agreement with Sony Music. After honing her skills even further, Varner became one of the first artists featured in BET's Music Matters campaign for 2010. As she prepares to take her place on center stage, Elle Varner sees no limit to her possibilities. “I think every girl dreams of being famous and enjoying all of the hoopla that comes with it, but at this point in my life, I know like I know my name that this is what I’m supposed to be doing," she says. "I’ve been blessed with the tremendous gift of music and it’s my responsibility to share it with the world. I see big things in the future". When asked in an interview what is to be expected from her debut, Varner said in a statement: “a lot of color, a lot of range. There’s fun songs, emotional songs, deep songs, everything you could think about is on that album.”

== Singles ==
The album's lead single "Only Wanna Give It to You" was released on August 16, 2011. The song features Varner's friend, American rapper J. Cole and peaked at No. 20 on the US Hot R&B/Hip-Hop Songs. On October 4, 2011, Varner appeared on BET's 106 & Park to premier the video for "Only Wanna Give It to You". The song received good critiques comparing the song to Mary J. Blige and Method Man's 1995 hit "I'll Be There for You/You're All I Need to Get By". They give praise to the Oak & Pop heavily influenced beat and Varner's vocals stating "Varner puts her distinctly unique voice on full display, laying down charismatic vocals declaring that she loves her man even more than her shoes".

"Refill", was included on the mixtape. The single was released in its entirety on January 31, 2012. The song peaked at number 10 on the US Hot R&B/Hip-Hop Songs.

== Promotion ==
=== Mixtape ===
On January 23, 2012, Varner released a mixtape, titled Conversational Lush as promotion for the album. The mixtape serves as her first full-length project, and includes production from J.U.S.T.I.C.E. League, Bei Maejor, Pop & Oak. A snippet of the album's second single "Refill", was included on the mixtape. "EV" contains a sample from "Izzo (H.O.V.A.)" as performed by Jay-Z, written by Shawn Carter. "32 Flavors" contains a sample/cover of "32 Flavors" by Ani DiFranco, written by Ani DiFranco and "Runaway" contains a sample from Lovely Day by Bill Withers, written by Bill Withers and Skip Scarborough.

=== Promotional singles ===
On February 7, 2012, "So Fly", one of Varner's earliest recordings was officially released via iTunes. The song, which serves as a promotional single, was also included on her debut mixtape.

== Reception ==
Professional ratings
Review scores
Source	Rating
AllMusic	4.5/5 stars
Memphis Flyer	A
MSN Music (Expert Witness)	A−
Rolling Stone	4/5 stars

Perfectly Imperfect debuted at number four on the U.S. Billboard 200 chart, with first-week sales of 33,000 copies in the United States. It also debuted at number two on the Billboard Top R&B/Hip-Hop Albums. As of October 20, 2012, Perfectly Imperfect has charted for ten weeks on the Billboard 200. First Lady Michelle Obama enjoyed the album after her daughter Malia introduced it to her.

In a positive review for Rolling Stone, Maura Johnston called Perfectly Imperfect "confident and catchy" with interesting musical elements and said that Varner sings in a way that underscores "the plain-spoken nature of her lyrics". Sarah Godfrey from The Washington Post felt that the album is exceptional because of its balance between "mainstream tracks and the edgier songs". Allmusic editor Andy Kellman believed that comparisons of Varner to Chrisette Michele and Jazmine Sullivan as unavoidable, but that her songwriting is unique and conveys her feelings in "such imaginative and clever ways". George Lang of The Oklahoman praised the album's "organic delivery and sensibilities", and asserted that "Varner could be the real thing, a singer who can bridge the gap between the sweet soul of the past and the tech-enabled pop of modern chart singles."

In The New York Times, Nate Chinen wrote that Varner is appropriately modest in her songwriting, which can account for "no moments on this album in which she sounds indecorous, imperious or inhuman." Chris Herrington of the Memphis Flyer wrote that Varner "nails one purposeful, personality-packed song after another ... nine of which are distinct and memorable after only a few listens." Writing for MSN Music, Robert Christgau found Varner "funny" and "disciplined" as a songwriter, "especially by the standards of r&b divas who share management with Lauryn and Alicia". He added that with the help of well crafted hooks from her collaborators, "she hones her God-given vocal intensity with no recourse to belting or melisma, and she keeps the grit under control". Christgau later ranked Perfectly Imperfect number 32 on his list of the year's best albums for The Barnes & Noble Review.

== Track listing ==
No.	Title	Writer(s)	Producer(s)	Length
1.	"Only Wanna Give It to You" (featuring J. Cole)	Elle Varner; Jermaine Lamar Cole; Warren "Oak" Felder; Andrew "Pop" Wansel; Frankie Storm; Marcel Hall; Marlon Williams	Pop & Oak	3:57
2.	"Refill"	Varner; Wansel; Darhyl Camper	Pop Wansel; DJ Camper	4:00
3.	"Sound Proof Room"	Varner; Wansel; Felder; Adrien Baker; Roy Morgan	Pop & Oak	3:07
4.	"I Don't Care"	Varner; Wansel; Felder; Claydes Smith; Dennis Thomas; Donna Johnson; George Brown; Robert Bell; Robert Mickens; Ronald Bell	Pop & Oak	3:06
5.	"Not Tonight"	E. Varner; Wansel; Felder; James Varner	Pop & Oak; Jimmy Varner	4:56
6.	"Leaf"	Varner; Wansel; Felder; Donald Meadows; Tanisha Broadwater	Pop & Oak; The Chess Klub	3:17
7.	"Oh What a Night"	Varner; Alexander Shuckburgh	Al Shux	3:20
8.	"Stop the Clock"	Varner; A. Wansel; Dexter Wansel; Meadows; Broadwater	Pop Wansel; The Varners; Dexter Wansel	4:05
9.	"Welcome Home"	E. Varner; J. Varner	J. Varner; Elle Varner	4:09
10.	"Damn Good Friends"	E. Varner; J. Varner	J. Varner; E. Varner	3:59
11.	"So Fly"	Varner; Wansel; Felder; Allan Fox	Pop & Oak	3:40
12.	"Go!" (iTunes bonus track)	Varner; Wansel; Felder; Ryuichi Sakamoto	Pop & Oak; The Varners	3:28
13.	"Do You Want To?" (iTunes bonus track)	Varner; Wansel; Felder; Steve Mostyn	Pop & Oak; Mostyn	3:45
Total length:				50:03

== Personnel ==
Credits for Perfectly Imperfect adapted from Allmusic.

- Conley Abrams – Engineer
- Chuck Amo – Hair Stylist
- Adrien Baker – Composer
- Leonhard Bartussek – Cello
- Robert Bell – Composer
- Ronald Bell – Composer
- Tanisha Broadwater – Composer, Production Coordination
- George Brown – Composer
- Jeff Byrd – Percussion
- James Cage – Trumpet
- Darhyl Camper – Composer, Instrumentation, Producer
- Charles Parker Jr. – Violin
- Chess Club – Producer
- Jermaine Cole – Composer, Featured Artist
- Ronald "Flippa" – Colson Programming
- Nina Cottman – Violin
- Carl Cox Jr. – Flute, Sax (Tenor)
- Kenneth Crouch – Fender Rhodes, Keyboards, Strings
- Dru DeCaro – Guitar
- Peter Edge – Producer
- Alex Evans – Bass
- Oak Felder – Associate Producer, composer, Instrumentation, producer
- Dave Foreman – Guitar
- Allan Fox – Composer
- Chris Galland – Mixing Assistant
- Thiannar Gomes – Guitar
- Erwin Gorostiza – Creative Director
- Marcel Hall – Composer
- Frances Hathaway – Make-Up
- Donna Johnson – Composer
- Olga Konopelsky – Violin
- Emma Kummrow – Violin
- Gene Lake – Drums
- Nayan Lassiter – Bass
- Kristin Lum – Art Direction, Design
- Erik Madrid – Mixing Assistant
- Jonathan Maron – Bass
- Manny Marroquin – Mixing
- Donald Meadows – Composer
- Donnie Meadows – Production Coordination
- Melonie Daniels – Vocals (Background)
- Robert "Spike" Mickens – Composer
- Roy Morgan – Composer
- Steve Mostyn – Bass, Guitar, Omnichord
- RCA – Record Label
- Ramon Rivas – Assistant Engineer
- Jeff Robinson – Producer
- Mikelyn Roderick – Vocals (Background)
- Queen Rose – Violin
- Karen Anna Schubert – French Horn
- Al Shuckburgh – Composer, Instrumentation, producer
- Stan Slotter – Trumpet
- Claydes Smith – Composer
- Adonis Sutherlin – A&R
- Robert Taylor – Musician
- Gregory Teperman – Violin
- Dennis Thomas – Composer
- Robert Thomas – Musician
- Stephen Tirpak – Trombone
- Miki Tsutsumi – Assistant Engineer, engineer
- Elle Varner – Composer, Guitar, Guitar (Acoustic), lyricist, Primary Artist, producer, Vocals (Background)
- Jimmy Varner – Bass, composer, Keyboards, Piano, producer, Vocal Producer
- The Varners – Vocal Arrangement, Vocal Producer, Vocal Recording
- Wouri Vice – Stylist
- John Emmet Walsh – Trumpet
- Pop Wansel – Associate Producer, composer, Instrumentation, producer
- Dexter Wansel – Composer, Horn Arrangements, Horn Conductor, producer, String Arrangements, String Conductor
- Mark Ward – Cello
- Stuart White – Engineer
- Marlon Williams – Composer
- Suzette Williams – A&R, producer
- Dave Wood – Guitar (Acoustic)
- Yohimbe – Guitar
- Naomi Yusada – Make-Up

== Charts ==
=== Weekly charts ===
Chart (2012)	Peak position
Japanese Albums (Oricon)	111
US Billboard 200	4
US Digital Albums (Billboard)	4
US Top R&B/Hip-Hop Albums (Billboard)	2

=== Year-end charts ===
Chart (2012)	Position
US Top R&B/Hip-Hop Albums (Billboard)	54
Chart (2013)	Position
US Top R&B/Hip-Hop Albums (Billboard)	89
