= Prima J =

American Latina musical group

- Origin: Rosemead, California, United States
- Genres: R&B; pop; hip-hop; Latin
- Years active: 2006–2009; 2016–present
- Label: Geffen
- Members: Janelle Martinez; Jessica Martinez
- Website: PrimaJ.com

Prima J is an American musical duo, composed of cousins Jessica and Janelle Martinez. Jessica (born on May 25, 1988) and Janelle (born on August 26, 1988) came up with their stage name by combining the letter "J" in each of their given names with the Spanish word "prima" (meaning female cousin).

== Career ==
Their self-titled debut album was released on June 27, 2008. They made their debut in 2007 with the single "Rock Star" for the Bratz Motion Picture Soundtrack. They were discovered by former talent manager Bruce Johnson, who, along with his business partner Jorge Hernandez, introduced the cousins to songwriter Stefanie Ridel.

Prima J made a brief appearance in Bratz, auditioning for the school talent show. Three of Bratz's stars, Logan Browning, Janel Parrish, and Nathalia Ramos, appear in the "Rock Star" music video.

Prior to "Rock Star", they performed the song "Gotta Lotta" for the Disney Channel original movie Jump In!, which was released on the film's soundtrack. They also starred in Baby Bash's music video "What Is It". They made a cameo in the direct-to-DVD film Bring It On: Fight to the Finish, the fifth installment of the Bring It On series.

In 2016, Janelle and Jessica reunited after a nearly eight-year hiatus. They host a radio broadcast with Dash Radio and released a single entitled "Ladies" on March 10, 2017.

== Tours ==
- Promo Tour (2008)

Date	City	Country	Venue
May 10	Irvine	United States	Irvine Meadows Amphitheater (Wango Tango 2008)
August 8	Glendale	United States	Jobing.com Arena (Jesse & Jordin Live Tour)
August 9	San Diego	United States	Humphrey’s Concerts by The Bay (Jesse & Jordin Live Tour)
August 16	Chicago	United States	Park West (Jesse & Jordin Live Tour)
August 20	Lowell	United States	Lowell Memorial Auditorium (Jesse & Jordin Live Tour)
August 24	Pittsburgh	United States	Benedum Center (Jesse & Jordin Live Tour)
August 29	Washington D.C.	United States	DAR Constitution Hall (Jesse & Jordin Live Tour)
September 12	Puyallup	United States	Puyallup Fair & Events Center

== Discography ==
Studio albums

- Prima J (2008)
