= Can't Be Friends =

Single by Trey Songz

from the album Passion, Pain & Pleasure
- Released: September 28, 2010
- Recorded: March 2010
- Genre: R&B
- Length: 3:45
- Label: Songbook, Atlantic
- Songwriters: Mario Winans, Tremaine Neverson
- Producer: Mario Winans

Trey Songz singles chronology
"Bottoms Up" (2010)	"Can't Be Friends" (2010)	"Here I Am" (2010)

"Can't Be Friends" is an R&B song by American recording artist Trey Songz. It was officially sent to U.S. urban radio on September 28, 2010 as the second single of Songz' fourth studio album, Passion, Pain & Pleasure. The song is produced by Mario Winans and written by Winans and Songz.

Lyrically, Trey Songz explains a bad breakup between him and his girlfriend and how they cannot be just friends after he fell in love with her.

The music is sampled from a piece known as "Bibo no aozora" composed by Ryuichi Sakamoto, released in 1996, which is also used in the 2006 film Babel.

== Music video ==
The official music video for this song was released on September 7, 2010. It is highly compared to Usher's "Confessions Part II" and "Trading Places" video, due to the very similar concept. It shows Trey on a chair, in a dark background, singing. As the song continues on, a girl makes her appearance and Trey goes shirtless.

== Charts ==
On the week dated October 2, 2010, "Can't Be Friends" debuted at number 74 on the Billboard Hot 100 and peaked at number 43. The song spent 13 consecutive weeks at number one on the Billboard Hot R&B/Hip-Hop Songs chart.

=== Weekly charts ===
Chart (2010–2011)	Peak position
US Billboard Hot 100	43
US Hot R&B/Hip-Hop Songs (Billboard)	1

=== Year-end charts ===
Chart (2010)	Position
US Hot R&B/Hip-Hop Songs (Billboard)	44
Chart (2011)	Position
US Hot R&B/Hip-Hop Songs (Billboard)	8

=== Decade-end charts ===
Chart (2010–2019)	Position
US Hot R&B/Hip-Hop Songs (Billboard)	13

== Certifications ==
Region	Certification	Certified units/sales
United States (RIAA)	Platinum	1,000,000^{‡}
^{‡} Sales+streaming figures based on certification alone.

== See also ==
- List of number-one R&B singles of 2010 (U.S.)
- List of number-one R&B singles of 2011 (U.S.)
