= Skool Boyz =

- Origin: Chicago, USA
- Genres: Post-disco, R&B, funk, soul
- Years active: 1975-1978 (as Flavor/Livin' Proof); 1980-1985 (as Skool Boyz)
- Labels: Destiny, Columbia
- Past members: Stan Sheppard; Billy Sheppard; Chauncey Matthews; Fred Brown

Skool Boyz was an American funk band founded in 1975 by Stan Sheppard as Flavor.

== History ==
The band was formed in 1975 as Flavor, consisting of Stan Sheppard (lead), Chauncey Matthews (vocals and keyboards), and Fred Brown (vocals and guitar). Stan is the son of producer Bill Sheppard. They first released "Don't Freeze Up" in 1976. When it started making a little noise, the band signed a deal with Ju-Par Records in Detroit, which was distributed by Motown Records.

In early 1977, Flavor released their only album "In Good Taste" and the label reissued their only single. When Motown ended its deal with Ju-Par, the band changed their name to Livin' Proof. They released their only self-titled album and two singles. When they failed to make an impact, Livin' Proof disbanded and Stan joined brothers Steven and Sterling Rice to form Triple S Connection.

In 1980, Stan, Chauncey and Fred reformed the band, this time under the name Skool Boyz. Joining them was Stan's brother William "Billy" Sheppard (vocals and bass guitar). They released their self-titled debut album and a few singles on Destiny Records. "Your Love", "This Feeling Must Be Real" and "Before You Go" were minor hits in the R&B charts

In 1984, the band signed a deal with Columbia Records took the band on. They released their self-titled second album, in which "Slip Away" was their highest charting R&B single, peaking at No. 47. It also contains some fine ballads "Nothin' Like a Slow Dance," "Before You Go", "You Are the Best Thing in My Life". Despite positive reviews, the album didn't chart.

The band followed up in 1985 with their final album This Is the Real Thing. Its single "Superfine (From Behind)" fizzled after a hopeful start. It failed to make an impact. The group disbanded afterwards.

Stan Sheppard later founded the record label Sheppard Lane Records - which was home to DJ Quik proteges Suga Free and Mausberg.

== Discography ==
=== Albums ===
Year	Title
1976	In Good Taste†
1978	Livin' Proof‡
1981	Skool Boyz
1984	Skool Boyz
1985	This Is The Real Thing

=== Singles ===
Year	Title	Chart positions
Year	Title	US R&B
1975	"Don't Freeze Up"†	-
1977	"You And I"‡	-
1978	"Move Your Body"‡	-
1981	"Your Love"	57
1982	"This Feeling Must Be Real"	54
1983	"Breakin' Out"	-
1983	"Before You Go"	63
1984	"Nothing Like A Slow Dance"	-
1984	"Slip Away"	47
1985	"Can We Do It Again"	-
1985	"Superfine (From Behind)"	86

† – Flavor
‡ – Livin' Proof
