= Elle Varner =

American singer-songwriter

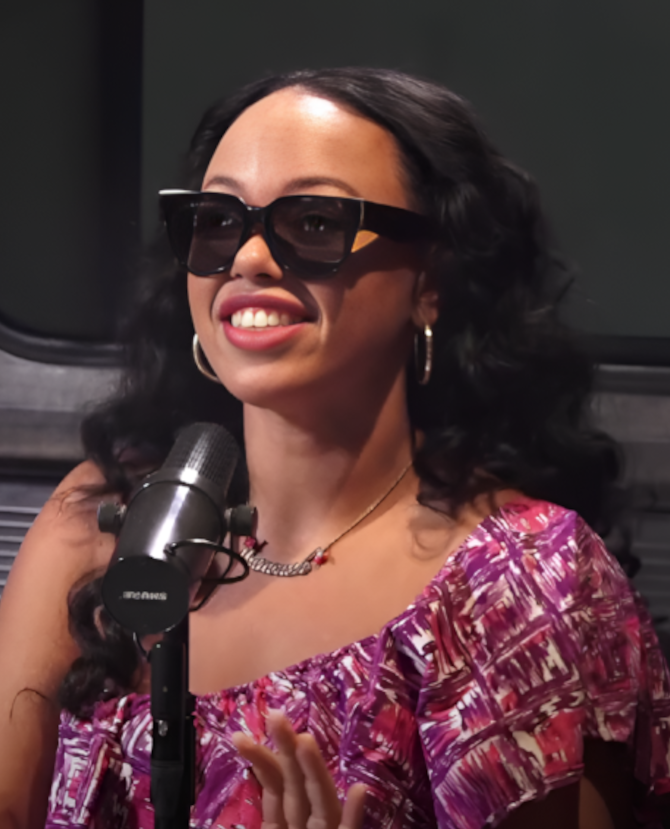
- Varner in 2019

Background information
- Born: Gabrielle Varner; February 12, 1989 (age 37); Brooklyn, New York City, U.S.
- Origin: Los Angeles, California, U.S.
- Occupation: Singer-songwriter
- Years active: 2009–present
- Labels: MNRK; MBK; RCA; J
- Website: www.ellevarner.com

Gabrielle Serene Varner (born February 12, 1989) is an American singer-songwriter. Born into a musical family in Brooklyn and raised in Los Angeles, Varner studied at New York University's Clive Davis Department of Recorded Music. In October 2009, she signed with RCA Records along with a co-publishing agreement with Sony Music.

Varner released her debut album, Perfectly Imperfect, in August 2012, preceded by the release of the single "Only Wanna Give It to You". The album debuted at number four on the US Billboard Hot 200.

== Early life ==
Varner is of Cape Verdean, African American, and Swedish descent, Elle herself has stated "my father is half Swedish and half black, and my mother is 100% Cape Verdean." The daughter of Mikelyn Roderick and Jimmy Varner, songwriters and publishers. Roderick was a backup vocalist for Barry White; and has written and recorded with Tevin Campbell and Rahsaan Patterson. Roderick released an album on the Dome label in 2007. Jimmy Varner is a songwriter, producer, and multi-instrumentalist who has collaborated with Gerald Alston, Kool & the Gang, and Will Downing. Her parents, together with Stan Sheppard, formed the group By All Means which was a minor success.

Varner spent most of her childhood sleeping on studio couches, running around green rooms, and watching her parents struggle to make a name in the industry. At age six she began to play musical instruments, beginning with the flute, and later she moved on to piano and guitar. She attended several music programs including actress Wendy Raquel Robinson's Amazing Grace Conservatory starting at age 11 and Alexander Hamilton High School's Academy of Music's Vocal Jazz Group. Varner then attended New York University’s Clive Davis Department of Recorded Music.

== Career ==
=== 2008-12: Perfectly Imperfect ===
At age 16, Varner picked up a guitar for the first time. She dropped the guitar and became a part of Alexander Hamilton High School's Academy of Music's Vocal Jazz Group. Varner was selected for the Grammy in the Schools Mentoring Program. Through this, she was taken weekly to the Fox Studio, where she met with mentor Kelly Burgos and president of Fox Music, Robert Kraft. She attended New York University and was admitted into the second class of the Clive Davis Department of Recorded Music. She graduated in 2008.

In October 2009 she signed with MBK/J-RCA Records with a co-publishing agreement with Sony Music. Varner became one of the first artists featured in BET's Music Matters campaign for 2010.

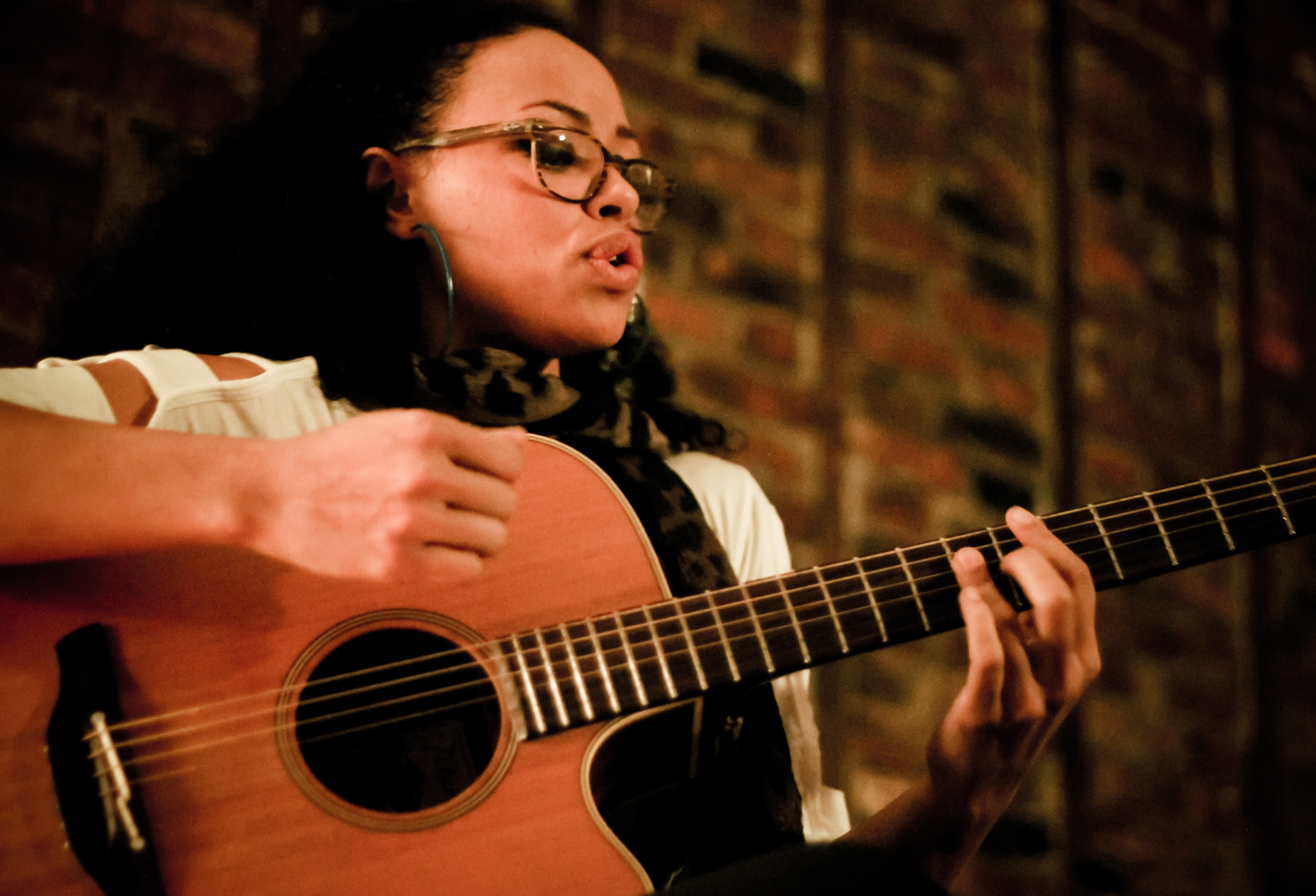
Varner performing in November 2011 in Brooklyn, New York for Sofar Sounds

Varner's debut single "Only Wanna Give It to You" was released on August 6, 2011. The song, which serves as the lead single from her debut studio album Perfectly Imperfect (2012), features American rapper J. Cole. The song peaked at #20 on the US Billboard R&B/Hip-Hop Songs chart. In October 2011, she was listed as one of TheBoomBox's '15 Artists to Watch' and was one of the artists featured in BET's Music Matters campaign. On October 7, 2011, RCA Music Group announced it was disbanding J Records along with Arista Records and Jive Records. With the shutdown, Varner (and all artists previously signed to these three labels) would release her future material on RCA Records. In preparation for her debut studio album, Varner released a mixtape on January 23, 2012, titled Conversational Lush. The second single from Varner's debut album "Refill" was released to iTunes January 31, 2012, and debuted at #78 on the US Billboard R&B/Hip-Hop Songs chart. On February 11, 2012, Varner and The Roots gave a performance dedicated to Whitney Houston, for the Roots Pre-Grammy Jam Session at the House of Blues in Los Angeles.

Varner's debut album, Perfectly Imperfect, was released on August 7, 2012 debuting at number four on the U.S. Billboard 200 chart, with first-week sales of 33,000 copies in the United States. It also debuted at number two on the Billboard Top R&B/Hip-Hop Albums. As of October 20, 2012, Perfectly Imperfect has charted for ten weeks on the Billboard 200. In September 2012, Varner was credited for co-writing the song "Use Me" for the R&B singer Miguel, taken from his second album Kaleidoscope Dream.

=== 2013-2016: Four Letter Word ===
For her second studio album, Varner worked with producers including Pop & Oak, Eric Hudson, DJ Dahi, Da Internz, and Hit-Boy. Varner stated that she has made her own genre while recording the album which she called "trap jazz." Varner described her second album as “definitely sexier,” than her previous. She released the promotional single "Rover" featuring American rapper Wale. After pushbacks, Four Letter Word was shelved and Varner was dropped from RCA Records.

=== 2019-Present: Ellevation ===
In 2019 Varner released her debut EP Ellevation.

== Artistry ==
"I'm definitely addressing feelings of the human experience, such as insecurity, jealousy, sexuality, sensuality, deep love, going out drinking there's just a kind of moment of a full spectrum."

— Varner, speaking on her musical topics.

Varner's voice has been compared to that of British singer Adele containing "soul "with a touch of raspy seduction." She is a mezzo-soprano Varner's debut mixtape contained an "eclectic mix of pop, hip hop, and soul", that contained lyrical content regarding "relationship issues, girl power and fun" as well as being compared to Rihanna and Erykah Badu.

Varner cites rapper Kanye West and soul singer Adele as two major influences noting that she wanted to combine both soul and hip-hop together saying "I only really wanted to combine the best of Hip-Hop and the best of that singer/songwriter soul. So I just picked those two as an example". Elle also draws inspiration from her hometown of Los Angeles commenting on how Los Angeles influences her she said “For me, there’s a nostalgia about L.A., especially West Coast rap, like N.W.A will always be a part of me growing up.” Varner also cites Etta James, Ella Fitzgerald, Brandy Norwood, Monica, Mariah Carey, Mary J. Blige, Lauryn Hill, Aretha Franklin, Alanis Morissette, Prince, Stevie Wonder, Dusty Springfield, Sade Adu, Jill Scott, Erykah Badu, Anita Baker, Smokey Robinson, Roberta Flack, Marvin Gaye and Jazmine Sullivan as influences.

== Discography ==
Studio albums

- Perfectly Imperfect (2012)
- Ellevation (2019)

Mixtapes

- Conversational Lush (2012)

== Tours ==
=== Headlining ===
- The Ellevation Tour (2020)

=== Supporting ===
- Chapter V World Tour (2012)
- NYLA Tour (2019)

== Awards and nominations ==
=== Grammy Awards ===
Year	Nominee / work	Award	Result
2013	"Refill"	Best R&B Song	Nominated

=== BET Awards ===
Year	Nominee / work	Award	Result
2013	Elle Varner	Best R&B Female Artist	Nominated
