= Juno Awards of 2014 =

Canadian music awards ceremony

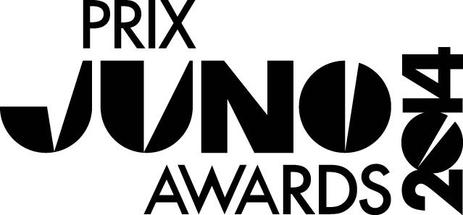
- The 2014 Juno Awards Logo
- Date: 30 March 2014
- Venue: MTS Centre, Winnipeg, Manitoba
- Hosted by: Classified, Johnny Reid, and Serena Ryder

Television/radio coverage
- Network: CTV

The Juno Awards of 2014 honoured Canadian music industry achievements in the latter part of 2012 and in most of 2013. The awards were presented in Winnipeg, Manitoba, Canada, during the weekend of 29–30 March 2014. The main ceremony took place at the MTS Centre and was televised on CTV.

== Planning ==
In October 2012, CARAS announced that it selected Winnipeg as the host city for the 2014 Juno Awards. Winnipeg previously hosted in 2005. The other known bid was from Victoria, British Columbia, which planned to host the primary ceremony at the Save-On-Foods Memorial Centre.

== Events ==
Juno Week events began on 24 March 2014:

- 28–29 March – JunoFest concerts
- 28 March – Juno Cup benefit hockey game at MTS Iceplex
- 29 March – private gala at RBC Convention Centre where most awards were presented
- 30 March – televised ceremony at the MTS Centre, where seven major awards were presented

=== Televised ceremony ===
The televised ceremony was hosted by Classified, Johnny Reid and Serena Ryder. Classified and Ryder jointly performed an opening song.

Performers included:

- Gord Bamford
- Dean Brody
- Classified
- Brett Kissel
- Matt Mays
- Sarah McLachlan
- OneRepublic
- Serena Ryder
- The Sheepdogs
- Tegan and Sara
- Walk off the Earth

Dallas Green (City and Colour) cancelled his originally scheduled appearance on the broadcast, citing a wish that a new Juno nominee be allowed to perform instead.

Robin Thicke was originally scheduled to perform, but cancelled his appearance shortly before the broadcast, claiming that he was under a "mandatory vocal rest".

== Nominees and winners ==
The Allan Waters Humanitarian Award was presented to Chantal Kreviazuk and Raine Maida. Frank Davies is the 2014 Walt Grealis Special Achievement Award recipient for his work in the recording industry. Bachman–Turner Overdrive were inducted into the Canadian Music Hall of Fame, introduced by astronaut Chris Hadfield.

Nominees were announced on 4 February 2014, based on music released during the eligibility window from 1 September 2012 to 13 November 2013.

=== People ===
Artist of the Year	Group of the Year
Serena Ryder; Celine Dion; Drake; Michael Bublé; Robin Thicke	Tegan and Sara; Arcade Fire; Blue Rodeo; Hedley; Walk off the Earth
Breakthrough Artist of the Year	Breakthrough Group of the Year
Brett Kissel; Florence K; Tim Hicks; Tyler Shaw; Wake Owl	A Tribe Called Red; Autumn Hill; Born Ruffians; Courage My Love; July Talk
Fan Choice Award	Songwriter of the Year
Justin Bieber; Arcade Fire; Avril Lavigne; Celine Dion; Drake; Hedley; Michael Bublé; Robin Thicke; Serena Ryder; Walk off the Earth	Serena Ryder – "Stompa", "What I Wouldn't Do" from Harmony by Serena Ryder; "When You Know (feat. Serena Ryder)" (co-songwriter Matt Epp) from Learning to Lose Control by Matt Epp & The Amorian Ensemble; Arcade Fire – "Afterlife", "Here Comes the Night Time", "Reflektor" from Reflektor by Arcade Fire; Henry "Cirkut" Walter – "Roar" (co-songwriters Katy Perry, Luke Gottwald, Max Martin, Bonnie McKee) from Prism by Katy Perry; "Timber" (co-songwriters Lee Oskar, Luke Gottwald, Kesha Sebert, Armando C. Pérez, Priscilla Hamilton, Greg Errico, Jamie Sanderson, Breyan Stanley Isaac, Keri Oskar, Pebe Sebert) from Global Warming: Meltdown by Pitbull; "Wrecking Ball" (co-songwriters Luke Gottwald, Maureen Anne McDonald, Stephan Moccio, Sacha Skarbek) from Bangerz by Miley Cyrus; Ron Sexsmith – "Deepens with Time", "Nowhere to Go", "Snake Road" from Forever Endeavour by Ron Sexsmith; Tegan and Sara Quin – "Closer", "I Was a Fool", "Now I'm All Messed Up" from Heartthrob by Tegan and Sara
Producer of the Year	Recording Engineer of the Year
Henry "Cirkut" Walter (co-producer Luke Gottwald) – "Wrecking Ball" from Bangerz by Miley Cyrus; "Give It 2 U" from Blurred Lines by Robin Thicke; Brian Howes and Jacob Hoggard – "Anything", "Crazy for You" from Wild Life by Hedley; Eric Ratz – "Sweet Mountain River", "The Lion" from Furiosity by Monster Truck; Ryan Guldemond and Ben Kaplan – "Let's Fall in Love", "Bit by Bit" from The Sticks by Mother Mother; Thomas "Tawgs" Salter – "This Is the Best" from Advanced Basics by USS; "Red Hands" (co-producer Gianni "Luminati" Nicassio) from R.E.V.O. by Walk off the Earth	Eric Ratz – "Sweet Mountain River", "The Lion" from Furiosity by Monster Truck; David Travers-Smith – "Dancing in the Dark" from These Wilder Things by Ruth Moody; "Flabbergasp" (co-engineer Jaron Freeman-Fox) from The Opposite of Everything by Jaron Freeman-Fox; Howie Beck – "Robotic" (co-engineer Graham Walsh) from Hannah Georgas by Hannah Georgas; "Red Hands" from R.E.V.O. by Walk off the Earth; Kevin Churko (co-engineer Kane Churko) – "The Wrong Side of Heaven" from The Wrong Side of Heaven and the Righteous Side of Hell, Volume 1 by Five Finger Death Punch; "Stardust" from Lux by Gemini Syndrome; Randy Staub – "Hollow" from The Devil Put Dinosaurs Here by Alice in Chains; "Be My Baby" from To Be Loved by Michael Bublé

=== Albums ===
Album of the Year	Aboriginal Album of the Year
Arcade Fire, Reflektor; Celine Dion, Loved Me Back to Life; Drake, Nothing Was the Same; Michael Bublé, To Be Loved; Serena Ryder, Harmony	George Leach, Surrender; Amanda Rheaume, Keep a Fire; Desiree Dorion, Small Town Stories; Inez Jasper, Burn Me Down; Nathan Cunningham, Road Renditions
Adult Alternative Album of the Year	Adult Contemporary Album of the Year
Ron Sexsmith, Forever Endeavour; A. C. Newman, Shut Down the Streets; Basia Bulat, Tall Tall Shadow; Hayden, Us Alone; The Sadies, Internal Sounds	Johnny Reid, A Christmas Gift to You; Alysha Brilla, In My Head; Celine Dion, Loved Me Back to Life; Chloe Albert, Dream Catcher; Coral Egan, The Year He Drove Me Crazy
Alternative Album of the Year	Blues Album of the Year
Arcade Fire, Reflektor; Rah Rah, The Poet's Dead; Royal Canoe, Today We're Believers; The Darcys, Warring; Yamantaka // Sonic Titan, UZU	Downchild, Can You Hear the Music; David Gogo, Come on Down; Harrison Kennedy, Soulscape; James Buddy Rogers, My Guitar's My Only Friend; MonkeyJunk, All Frequencies
Children's Album of the Year	Classical Album of the Year – Solo or Chamber Ensemble
Helen Austin, Colour It; Charlie Hope, Sing As We Go!; Gary Rasberry, What's the Big Idea?!?; Marie-Claude, Mon coffret à surprises; Splash'N Boots, Coconuts Don't Fall Far From the Tree	James Ehnes, Prokofiev Complete Works for Violin; Jan Lisiecki, Chopin: Études Op. 10 & 25; Janina Fialkowska / The Chamber Players of Canada, Mozart: Concertos Nos. 13 & 14; Louis Lortie, Liszt at The Opera; Stewart Goodyear, Beethoven: The Complete Piano Sonatas
Classical Album of the Year – Large Ensemble or Soloist(s) with Large Ensemble Accompaniment	Classical Album of the Year – Vocal or Choral Performance
James Ehnes, Britten & Shostakovich: Violin Concerti; Angela Hewitt, Mozart: Piano Concertos Nos. 17 & 27; Nadina Mackie Jackson and Guy Few with Group of 27, Canadian Concerto Project, Volume One; Tafelmusik Baroque Orchestra, House of Dreams; Toronto Symphony Orchestra, Rachmaninoff: Symphonic Dances & Stravinsky: The Rite of Spring	Marie-Nicole Lemieux & André Gagnon, Lettres de Madame Roy à sa fille Gabrielle; Group of 27, Eric Paetkau – conductor, Shannon Mercer – soprano, Berlioz: Les nuits d'été – Palej : The Poet & the War – Rorate Coeli; Isabel Bayrakdarian, Ravel, Sayat-Nova & Kradjian: Troubadour & the Nightingale; Pacific Baroque Orchestra, Alexander Weimann, Owen Willets, Karina Gauvin, Allyson McHardy, Amanda Forsythe, Nathan Berg, Handel: Orlando, HWV 31; Vancouver Chamber Choir, A Quiet Place: Music for Healing III
Contemporary Christian/Gospel Album of the Year	Country Album of the Year
Tim Neufeld, Trees; Fraser Campbell, Search the Heavens; Jordan Raycroft, Jordan Raycroft; The City Harmonic, Heart; The High Bar Gang, Lost & Undone: A Gospel Bluegrass Companion	Dean Brody, Crop Circles; Brett Kissel, Started with a Song; Gord Bamford, Country Junkie; Small Town Pistols, Small Town Pistols; Tim Hicks, Throw Down
Electronic Album of the Year	Francophone Album of the Year
Ryan Hemsworth, Guilt Trips; A Tribe Called Red, Nation II Nation; Blue Hawaii, Untogether; Graze, Graze; Noah Pred, Third Culture	Karim Ouellet, Fox; Alex Nevsky, Himalaya mon amour; Damien Robitaille, Omniprésent; Daniel Bélanger, Chic de ville; Pierre Lapointe, Punkt
Instrumental Album of the Year	International Album of the Year
Esmerine, Dalmak; Colin Stetson, New History Warfare Vol. 3: To See More Light; Mahogany Frog, Senna; Petr Cancura, Down Home; The Peggy Lee Band, Invitation	Bruno Mars, Unorthodox Jukebox; Eminem, The Marshall Mathers LP 2; Imagine Dragons, Night Visions; One Direction, Take Me Home; Pink, The Truth About Love
Contemporary Jazz Album of the Year	Traditional Jazz Album of the Year
Christine Jensen Jazz Orchestra, Habitat; Brandi Disterheft, Gratitude; Darcy James Argue's Secret Society, Brooklyn Babylon; Earl MacDonald, Mirror of the Mind; Trifolia, Le refuge	Mike Downes, Ripple Effect; Carn Davidson 9, Nine; Ian McDougall 12-tet, The Ian McDougall 12tet LIVE; John MacLeod & His Rex Hotel Orchestra, Our Second Set; Phil Dwyer and Don Thompson, Look for the Silver Lining
Vocal Jazz Album of the Year	Metal/Hard Music Album of the Year
Mike Rud, Notes on Montréal ft. Sienna Dahlen; Amy McConnell & William Sperandei, Stealing Genius; Erin Propp with Larry Roy, Courage, My Love; Matt Dusk, My Funny Valentine – The Chet Baker Songbook; Sonia Johnson, Charles Biddle Jr. & Annie Poulain, Triades	Protest the Hero, Volition; Anciients, Heart of Oak; Gorguts, Colored Sands; KEN mode, Entrench; The Flatliners, Dead Language
Pop Album of the Year	Rock Album of the Year
Tegan and Sara, Heartthrob; Hedley, Wild Life; Michael Bublé, To Be Loved; Robin Thicke, Blurred Lines; Walk off the Earth, R.E.V.O.	Matt Mays, Coyote; Headstones, Love + Fury; Matthew Good, Arrows of Desire; Monster Truck, Furiosity; Three Days Grace, Transit of Venus
Roots & Traditional Album of the Year – Solo	Roots & Traditional Album of the Year – Group
Justin Rutledge, Valleyheart; Daniel Romano, Come Cry with Me; David Francey, So Say We All; Donovan Woods, Don't Get Too Grand; Lindi Ortega, Tin Star	The Strumbellas, We Still Move on Dance Floors; Lee Harvey Osmond, The Folk Sinner; Little Miss Higgins & the Winnipeg Five, Bison Ranch Recording Sessions; The Devin Cuddy Band, Volume One; The Wilderness of Manitoba, Island of Echoes
World Music Album of the Year
David Buchbinder & Odessa/Havana, Walk to the Sea; Adonis Puentes, Sabor A Café; Azam Ali and Loga R. Torkian, Lamentation of Swans – A Journey Towards Silence; Kobo Town, Jumbie in the Jukebox; The Lemon Bucket Orkestra, Lume, Lume

=== Songs and recordings ===
Single of the Year	Classical Composition of the Year
Tegan and Sara, "Closer"; Arcade Fire, "Reflektor"; Classified ft. David Myles, "Inner Ninja"; Michael Bublé, "It's a Beautiful Day"; Serena Ryder, "What I Wouldn't Do"	Allan Gordon Bell, "Field Notes" from Gravity and Grace; James O'Callaghan, "Isomorphia for Orchestra and Electronics" from Mahler Symphony 9; R. Murray Schafer, "Quatuors à cordes No. 12" from Quatuor Molinari; Stephen Chatman, "Magnificat" from Magnificat: Songs of Reflection; Tim Brady, "Atacama: Symphonie No. 3" from Atacama: Symphonie No. 3
Dance Recording of the Year	R&B/Soul Recording of the Year
Armin van Buuren & Trevor Guthrie, "This Is What It Feels Like"; deadmau5, > album title goes here <; DVBBS & Borgeous, "Tsunami"; Jacynthe, "Locked Down"; Mia Martina, "Heartbreaker"	JRDN ft. Kardinal Offishall, "Can't Choose"; Joanna Borromeo, "Kaleidoscope"; Kim Davis, "There's Only One"; Melanie Durrant, "Gone"; The Weeknd, "Kiss Land"
Rap Recording of the Year	Reggae Recording of the Year
Drake, Nothing Was the Same; Classified, Classified; Rich Kidd, In My Opinion; Shad, Flying Colours; SonReal, Everywhere We Go	Exco Levi & Kabaka Pyramid, "Strive"; Akustix, "Mandela"; Ammoye, "Baby It's You"; Dru, "Love Collision"; Dubmatix, "Rebel Massive"

=== Other ===
Recording Package of the Year	Video of the Year
Arts & Crafts: 2003-2013 – Arts & Crafts, Various Artists Robyn Kotyk (art director/designer/illustrator), Petra Cuschieri, Justin Peroff (designers); Bones − Bodhi Jones Ian Grais and Chris Staples (art directors), Sofia Pona, Kim Ridgewell, Lisa Nakamura (designers), Ben Tour (illustrator); Lullabies and Wake-Up Calls – Dinah Thorpe Jayme L. Spinks (art director/designer), Janet Kimber (photographer); White Paint – Hollerado Menno Versteeg (art director), Anne Douris (designer), Annie Murphy (photographer); La Mort Pop Club – We Are Wolves Vincent Lévesque and Alex Ortiz (art director/designer/illustrator/photographer)	"Feeling Good" – The Sheepdogs Matt Barnes; "Je t'aime comme tu es" – Daniel Bélanger Agathe Bray-Bourret; "Friend of Mine" – D-Sisive Briin 'Briin?' Bernstein & Daniel AM Rosenberg; "Anything" – Hedley John Poliquin; "King and Lionheart" – Of Monsters and Men WeWereMonkeys
