= Juno Award for Contemporary R&B/Soul Recording of the Year =

Canadian music award

The Juno Award for Contemporary R&B/Soul Recording of the Year is an annual Canadian music award, presented as part of the Juno Awards to honour the year's best Canadian recordings in contemporary rhythm and blues and soul music. The award was presented for the first time at the Juno Awards of 2021, after the splitting of the former R&B/Soul Recording of the Year into new categories for contemporary and traditional music.

== Winners and nominees ==
Year	Winner(s)	Recording	Nominees	Ref.
2021	The Weeknd	After Hours	Jessie Reyez, Before Love Came to Kill Us; Savannah Ré, Where You Are; Shay Lia, Solaris; Tobi, Holiday	
2022	The Weeknd	"Take My Breath"	a l l i e, Tabula Rasa; Aqyila, "Vibe for Me (Bob for Me)"; Kallitechnis, "Gifted"; K-os, "Supernovas"	
2023	Jessie Reyez	Yessie	dvsn, If I Get Caught; Adria Kain, When Flowers Bloom; Savannah Ré, WTF; Dylan Sinclair, No Longer in the Suburbs	
2024	Daniel Caesar	Never Enough	Nonso Amadi, When It Blooms; Aqyila, For the Better; Shay Lia, Facets; Jon Vinyl, Heartbreak Hill	
2025	Aqyila	Bloom	Avenoir, Noire; Loony, Loony; Dylan Sinclair, "For the Boy in Me"; Zeina, Eastend Confessions	
2026	Daniel Caesar	Son of Spergy	Avenoir, "Mirage"; Majid Jordan, Life 2; Adria Kain, "Set Me Free"; Jessie Reyez, Paid in Memories; SadBoi, Therapist	
