= Raycroft =

Raycroft is an English surname. Notable people include:

- Andrew Raycroft (born 1980), Canadian former professional ice hockey player
- Joseph Raycroft (1867–1955), American basketball coach
- Jordan Raycroft (born 1991), Canadian singer and member of the band Raycroft

== See also ==
- Jordan Raycroft (album)
- Raycroft Lookout, a stone platform in Monroe State Forest, Massachusetts, United States
