= Craig Stickland =

Canadian pop singer-songwriter

Craig Stickland is a Canadian pop singer-songwriter, whose debut album Starlit Afternoon was a Juno Award nominee for Adult Contemporary Album of the Year at the Juno Awards of 2021.

Born in Vancouver, British Columbia, and raised in Toronto, Ontario, Stickland released a number of singles in 2019 before the release of the full album Starlit Afternoon. He toured as a guitarist in Alessia Cara's band on her The Pains of Growing Tour, and filled in as the full opening act for one show in Minnesota for which primary opener Ryland James was unavailable.

Stickland has also had some supporting or guest roles as a film and television actor, most notably in the film Scott Pilgrim vs. the World.
