= L&H =

L&H may refer to:

- The Literary and Historical Society (University College Dublin), the college's debating society
- Lernout & Hauspie, a Belgian speech and language technology company that went bankrupt in 2001
- Love & Hyperbole, a 2025 album by Alessia Cara
