= Juno Awards of 2021 =

Canadian music awards ceremony

- The 2021 Juno Awards Logo
- Date: 6 June 2021
- Venue: Rebel; Toronto, Ontario
- Hosted by: Angeline Tetteh-Wayoe
- Most nominations: The Weeknd (6)

Television/radio coverage
- Network: CBC

The Juno Awards of 2021, honouring Canadian music achievements, were presented on 6 June 2021, observing the 50th anniversary of these awards. The main ceremonies were televised on CBC.

The ceremony was originally scheduled to take place in March, but in December 2020 organizers announced that it was being pushed back to May, before being pushed back to June, due to the ongoing COVID-19 pandemic in Canada.

The awards had initially been planned to take place as a conventional live gala in Toronto, Ontario, although due to the continued pandemic, these plans were cancelled; instead, the televised ceremony consisted of prerecorded or live performances by Canadian musicians at various venues throughout Canada, alongside acknowledgements of the already-announced winners and the presentation of just six top categories. Angeline Tetteh-Wayoe of CBC Music hosted the ceremony from Toronto's Rebel nightclub, although most award presenters and performances were broadcast from other remote locations.

The awards in most categories were presented in a pre-show event on June 4. Before the main ceremony, Alessia Cara hosted a one-hour special called My Junos Moment, in which various Canadian artists were asked to share their reflections and reminiscences on their memorable moments at past Juno ceremonies.

== Performers ==
The full list of performers were announced on 27 May 2021.

| Performer(s) | Song(s) | Venue(s) |
|---|---|---|
| Justin Bieber | "Somebody" | |
| JP Saxe Julia Michaels | "If the World Was Ending" | |
| Michie Mee Maestro Fresh Wes Kardinal Offishall Jully Black Nav Haviah Mighty | A 30th Anniversary Tribute to Rap at the Junos: "Let Your Backbone Slide" "Ol' Time Killin'" "Turks" | Imperial Theatre, Saint John (Maestro Fresh Wes); Los Angeles (Nav) |
| Jann Arden | "Good Mother" | National Music Centre |
| Ali Gatie Tate McRae | "What If I Told You That I Love You" "Lie to Me" | |
| William Prince Serena Ryder | "The Spark" | Church of the Holy Trinity |
| Jessie Reyez | "Do You Love Her" "Before Love Came to Kill Us" | |
| The Tragically Hip Feist | "It's a Good Life If You Don't Weaken" | Massey Hall |

== Presenters ==
The full list of presenters were announced on 27 May 2021, following the list of performers.

- Susan Aglukark
- Will Arnett
- The Basement Gang
- Paul Brandt
- Michael Bublé
- Alessia Cara
- Jim Cuddy
- Steven Guilbeault
- Kaytranada
- Max Kerman
- Geddy Lee and Alex Lifeson of Rush
- Gordon Lightfoot
- Sarah McLachlan
- Anne Murray
- Andrew Phung
- Ed Robertson
- Buffy Sainte-Marie
- Liberty Silver
- Shania Twain

== Winners and nominees ==
Nominees were announced on 9 March 2021.

The Tragically Hip were presented with the Juno Humanitarian Award. Due to the cancellation of the 2020 ceremony, singer-songwriter Jann Arden received her formal induction into the Canadian Music Hall of Fame following its announcement the previous year.

A segment of the television broadcast also profiled Mary Piercey-Lewis, a music teacher from Inuksuk High School in Iqaluit, Nunavut who was named Teacher of the Year by MusiCounts, CARAS' music education initiative.

=== People ===
| Artist of the Year | Group of the Year |
|---|---|
| The Weeknd; Ali Gatie; Céline Dion; Jessie Reyez; Justin Bieber | Arkells; Half Moon Run; Loud Luxury; The Glorious Sons; The Reklaws |
| Breakthrough Artist of the Year | Breakthrough Group of the Year |
| JP Saxe; Ryland James; Tate McRae; Powfu; Curtis Waters | Crown Lands; 2Frères; Manila Grey; Peach Pit; Young Bombs |
| Fan Choice Award | Songwriter of the Year |
| Shawn Mendes; Justin Bieber; Les Cowboys Fringants; Ali Gatie; Tate McRae; NAV; JP Saxe; Lennon Stella; Curtis Waters; The Weeknd | Abel Tesfaye, Ahmad Balshe, Jason "DaHeala" Quenneville: "After Hours", "Blinding Lights", "Save Your Tears"; Alanis Morissette: "Ablaze", "Reasons I Drink", "Smiling"; Alessia Cara: "Hell and High Water", "I Choose", "Welcome Back"; Jessie Reyez: "Coffin", "Far Away", "No One's in the Room"; JP Saxe: "A Little Bit Yours", "Golf on TV", "If the World was Ending" |
| Producer of the Year | Recording Engineer of the Year |
| WondaGurl: "Aim for the Moon" (Pop Smoke feat. Quavo); "Gang Gang" (JackBoys and Sheck Wes); Akeel Henry: "Rain" (Trey Songz feat. Swae Lee); "Spell My Name" (Toni Braxton); Jordon Manswell: "Fallin'" (Toni Braxton); "Home" (Dylan Sinclair); Kaytranada: "10%" (Kaytranada feat. Kali Uchis); "Frontstreet (Freestyle)" (Mick Jenkins); Murda Beatz: "Motive" (Ariana Grande with Doja Cat); "Say You Love Me" (Chris Brown & Young Thug) | Serban Ghenea: "Blinding Lights" (The Weeknd); "Positions" (Ariana Grande); George Seara: "Good Love" and "Take Me Home" (Shawn Hook); Jason Dufour: "All of the Feelings" (Kiesza) and "Whiskey Tonight" (Jade Eagleson); Johann Deterville: "Home" (Dylan Sinclair) and "La Memoria" (Jessie Reyez); John "Beetle" Bailey: "The End of a Love Affair" (Micah Barnes) and "The Grand Bazaar" (Sultans of String feat. Béla Fleck and Robi Botos) |

=== Albums ===
| Album of the Year | Adult Alternative Album of the Year |
|---|---|
| The Weeknd, After Hours; Justin Bieber, Changes; Leonard Cohen, Thanks for the Dance; Céline Dion, Courage; Ali Gatie, You | Bahamas, Sad Hunk; Begonia, Fear; Basia Bulat, Are You in Love?; Sarah Harmer, Are You Gone; Rufus Wainwright, Unfollow the Rules |
| Adult Contemporary Album of the Year | Alternative Album of the Year |
| Alanis Morissette, Such Pretty Forks in the Road; Céline Dion, Courage; Pierre Lapointe, Pour déjouer l'ennui; Craig Stickland, Starlit Afternoon; Storry, CH III: The Come Up | July Talk, Pray for It; Dizzy, The Sun and Her Scorch; PUP, This Place Sucks Ass; U.S. Girls, Heavy Light; Curtis Waters, Pity Party |
| Blues Album of the Year | Children's Album of the Year |
| Crystal Shawanda, Church House Blues; Rick Fines, Solar Powered Too; Angel Forrest, Hell Bent With Grace; Dione Taylor, Spirits in the Water; Samantha Martin & Delta Sugar, The Reckless One | Splash'N Boots, Heart Parade; ABC Singsong, Letters and Numbers; Njacko Backo and Kalimbas at Work, J'aime mon école; Ginalina, Small But Mighty; Charlie Hope, Goodnight to you All: Traditional Lullabies from Ireland & the UK |
| Classical Album of the Year – Solo or Chamber Ensemble | Classical Album of the Year – Large Ensemble or Soloist(s) with Large Ensemble Accompaniment |
| Ensemble Made in Canada, Mosaïque; James Ehnes, Jon Kimura Parker and Jens Lindemann, Bach & Brahms Reimagined; James Ehnes with Andrew Armstrong, Beethoven: Violin Sonatas Nos. 4, 5 & 8; Les Barocudas, La Peste; Quatuor Bozzini, Ana Sokolović: Short Stories | Montreal Symphony Orchestra conducted by Kent Nagano feat. Andrew Wan, Ginastera - Bernstein - Moussa: Œuvres pour violon et orchestre/Works for Violin and Orchestra; Les Violons du Roy conducted by Jonathan Cohen feat. Charles Richard-Hamelin, Mozart: Concertos pour piano/Piano Concertos Nos. 22 & 24; Louis Lortie with BBC Philharmonic conducted by Edward Gardner, Saint-Saëns: Piano Concertos Nos. 3, 5, & Other Works; Laval Symphony Orchestra conducted by Alain Trudel feat. Jean-Philippe Sylvestre, Jacques Hétu: Concertos; Montreal Symphony Orchestra with Kraków Philharmonic Choir and Warsaw Boys' Choir conducted by Kent Nagano, Penderecki: St. Luke Passion |
| Classical Album of the Year – Vocal or Choral Performance | Contemporary Christian/Gospel Album of the Year |
| Toronto Mendelssohn Choir with Toronto Symphony Orchestra conducted by Sir Andrew Davis, Massenet: Thaïs, Erin Wall, Joshua Hopkins, Andrew Staples; Barbara Hannigan with Ludwig Orchestra, La passione; Karina Gauvin with Pacific Baroque Orchestra conducted by Alexander Weimann, Nuits blanches: Airs d'opéra à la cour de Russie au XVIIe siècle/Opera Arias at the Russian Court of the 18th Century; Luminous Voices conducted by Timothy Shantz, Sea Dreams; Sarah Slean with Symphony Nova Scotia conducted by Bernhard Gueller, Sarah Slean and Symphony Nova Scotia | Shawna Cain, The Way; Steve Bell, Wouldn't You Love to Know?; Allen Froese, All Things New; K-Anthony, The Cure; Matt Maher, Alive & Breathing |
| Country Album of the Year | Electronic Album of the Year |
| Tenille Townes, The Lemonade Stand; Jade Eagleson, Jade Eagleson; Lindsay Ell, Heart Theory; Mackenzie Porter, Drinkin' Songs: The Collection; Dallas Smith, Timeless | Caribou, Suddenly; Attlas, Lavender God; Bob Moses, Desire; CRi, Juvenile; Jessy Lanza, All the Time |
| Francophone Album of the Year | Indigenous Music Album of the Year |
| Louis-Jean Cormier, Quand la nuit tombe; 2Frères, À tous les vents; Les Cowboys Fringants, Les antipodes; Pierre Lapointe, Pour déjouer l'ennui; Klô Pelgag, Notre-Dame-des-Sept-Douleurs | Leela Gilday, North Star Calling; Burnstick, Kîyânaw; Crystal Shawanda, Church House Blues; Julian Taylor, The Ridge; Terry Uyarak, Nunarjua Isulinginniani |
| Instrumental Album of the Year | International Album of the Year |
| Blitz//Berlin, Movements III; Bruce Cockburn, Crowing Ignites; David Foster, Eleven Words; Flore Laurentienne, Volume 1; Gordon Grdina, Prior Street | Harry Styles, Fine Line; Luke Combs, What You See Is What You Get; Eminem, Music to Be Murdered By; Pop Smoke, Shoot for the Stars, Aim for the Moon; Taylor Swift, Folklore |
| Jazz Album of the Year – Solo | Jazz Album of the Year – Group |
| Jocelyn Gould, Elegant Traveler; Elmer Ferrer, Básico, No Básico y Dirigido; Junior Santos, Conpambiche; Rachel Therrien, Vena; Andrés Vial, Gang of Three | Andy Milne and Unison, The reMission; Brandi Disterheft Trio with George Coleman, Surfboard; Emie R Roussel Trio, Rythme de passage; Florian Hoefner Trio, First Spring; Pat LaBarbera and Kirk MacDonald, Trane of Thought, Live at the Rex |
| Vocal Jazz Album of the Year | Metal/Hard Music Album of the Year |
| Sammy Jackson, With You; Laila Biali, Out of Dust; Sophie Day, Clémence; Matt Dusk, Sinatra; Diana Krall, This Dream of You | Unleash the Archers, Abyss; Annihilator, Ballistic, Sadistic; Kataklysm, Unconquered; Protest the Hero, Palimpsest; Vile Creature, Glory, Glory! Apathy Took Helm! |
| Pop Album of the Year | Rock Album of the Year |
| Justin Bieber, Changes; Ryland James, Ryland James; Johnny Orlando, It's Never Really Over; JP Saxe, Hold It Together; Lennon Stella, Three. Two. One. | JJ Wilde, Ruthless; Crown Lands, Crown Lands; Sam Roberts Band, All of Us; Silverstein, A Beautiful Place to Drown; Neil Young and Crazy Horse, Colorado |
| Contemporary Roots Album of the Year | Traditional Roots Album of the Year |
| Rose Cousins, Bravado; Leela Gilday, North Star Calling; Tami Neilson, Chickaboom!; William Prince, Reliever; Julian Taylor, The Ridge | Pharis and Jason Romero, Bet on Love; Beòlach, All Hands; Le Diable à Cinq, Debout!; Nick Hornbuckle, 13 or So; Rum Ragged, The Thing About Fish |
| World Music Album of the Year | Comedy Album of the Year |
| Okan, Espiral; Gypsy Kumbia Orchestra, VelkomBak; Lengaïa Salsa Brava, The Gold Diggers; Mazacote, Patria; Zal Sissokho, Kora Flamenca | Jacob Samuel, Horse Power; Shirley Gnome, Decoxification; Nick Nemeroff, The Pursuit of Comedy Has Ruined My Life; Derek Seguin, PanDerek (1st Wave!); Matt Wright, Existing Is Exhausting |

=== Songs and recordings ===
| Single of the Year | Classical Composition of the Year |
|---|---|
| The Weeknd, "Blinding Lights"; Brett Kissel, "Drink About Me"; JP Saxe feat. Julia Michaels, "If the World Was Ending"; Justin Bieber feat. Quavo, "Intentions"; Lennon Stella, "Kissing Other People" | Samy Moussa, "Violin Concerto 'Adrano'"; Alexina Louie, "Take the Dog Sled"; Ana Sokolović, "Commedia dell'arte"; Anna Höstman, "Harbour"; Zosha DiCarti, "Tachitipo" |
| Dance Recording of the Year | Rap Recording of the Year |
| Kaytranada, Bubba; Felix Cartal and Sophie Simmons, MINE; Rezz X Grabbitz, Someone Else; So Sus, Voices; Frank Walker, Dancing in the Dark | Tobi, ELEMENTS Vol. 1; 88Glam, New Mania; bbno$ and Yung Gravy, Baby Gravy 2; Eric Reprid, Cold World; NAV, Good Intentions (Brown Boy 2 Deluxe Version) |
| Contemporary R&B/Soul Recording of the Year | Traditional R&B/Soul Recording of the Year |
| The Weeknd, After Hours; Jessie Reyez, Before Love Came to Kill Us; Savannah Ré, "Where You Are"; Shay Lia, Solaris; Tobi, Holiday | Savannah Ré, "Solid"; Emanuel, Alt Therapy Session 1: Disillusion; Iamtheliving, "In This Thing Called Life"; Dylan Sinclair, Proverb; Charlotte Day Wilson, "Take Care of You" |
| Reggae Recording of the Year | |
Töme X Sean Kingston, I Pray; Ammoye, Give It All; Blessed, Black Man; Dubmatix, Roots Rock; Kirk Diamond, Let It Be Done

=== Other ===
| Album Artwork of the Year | Video of the Year |
|---|---|
| Julien Hébert (art director), David Beauchemin (designer), Florence Obrecht (illustrator) and Marc-Étienne Mongrain (photographer) — Klô Pelgag, Notre-Dame-des-Sept-Douleurs; Lido Pimienta and Orly Anan (art directors), Mat Dunlap (designer), Daniela Murillo (photographer) — Lido Pimienta, Miss Colombia; Jared Barter (art director and designer), Michael Zavacky (art director and Illustrator), Maryn Devine and Rémi Thériault (photographers) — Lynne Hanson, Just Words; Luke Hoskin (art director), John Meloche (designer), Martin Wittfooth (illustrator) — Protest the Hero, Palimpsest; Peter Dreimanis (art director, designer and photographer), Scott Waring (art director and designer), Leah Fay (designer), Lyle Bell and Ty Snaden (photographers) — July Talk, Pray for It | Emma Higgins — Jessie Reyez, "No One's in the Room"; Ben Knechtel — Scott Helman, "Wait No More"; Brittney Canda and Vincent René-Lortie — Sheenah Ko, "Wrap Me Up"; Les Solis and Peter Huang — Jessie Reyez, "Intruders"; Nick DenBoer — deadmau5 and the Neptunes, "Pomegranate" |
