= Boslen =

Canadian rapper

- Born: Corben Nikk Bowen; January 15, 1999 (age 27); Vancouver, British Columbia
- Origin: Chilliwack, British Columbia
- Genres: Alternative hip hop, hip hop, trap
- Instrument: Vocals
- Years active: 2020–present
- Labels: Capitol; Chaos Club
- Website: www.boslenmusic.com

Corben Nikk Bowen known professionally as Boslen, is a Canadian rapper based in Vancouver, British Columbia. He is most noted for his EP Gonzo, which was shortlisted for the Juno Award for Rap Album/EP of the Year at the Juno Awards of 2023.

Boslen was previously signed to a joint venture deal between Capitol Music Group and Chaos Club Digital, a Vancouver-based record label and management group co-founded by Boslen's manager, Isaac Markinson.

== Early life ==
Corbin Nikk Bowen, the son of an African Canadian father and an indigenous Canadian mother, was born in Vancouver, British Columbia in 1999. He was raised in Chilliwack and would begin making music in 2020.

== Career ==
He debuted in 2020 with the singles "Vultures" and "My Ways", before releasing his full-length debut album Dusk to Dawn in 2021. The album includes collaborations with Dro Kenji and Rascalz on the track eleven track mixtape. The Gonzo EP followed in 2022.

In 2023, he participated in an all-star recording of Serena Ryder's single "What I Wouldn't Do", which was released as a charity single to benefit Kids Help Phone's Feel Out Loud campaign for youth mental health.
