= Katie Tupper =

Canadian singer-songwriter

Katie Tupper is a Canadian soul and rhythm and blues singer-songwriter from Saskatoon, Saskatchewan, whose full-length debut album Greyhound was released in 2026.

== Career ==
Tupper played competitive ice hockey for the Saskatoon Stars of the Saskatchewan Female U18 AAA Hockey League as a teenager, before turning to music.

She released her debut single, "Live Inside", in 2021, before releasing the EP Towards the End in 2022. She followed up in 2023 with the EP Where to Find Me, for which she received a Juno Award nomination for Traditional R&B/Soul Recording of the Year at the Juno Awards of 2024.

Greyhound was released in January 2026, and was supported by a concert tour. The album was longlisted for the 2026 Polaris Music Prize.

She is out as bisexual.

== Discography ==
- Towards the End - 2022
- Where to Find Me - 2023
- Greyhound - 2026
