= Avenoir =

Canadian rhythm and blues singer from Edmonton, Alberta

- Born: Caleb Odidi; 2001 or 2002 (age 23–24); Cape Town, South Africa
- Genres: R&B
- Occupations: Singer; songwriter
- Years active: 2022–present

Caleb Odidi (born 2002 or 2003), known professionally as Avenoir, is a Canadian R&B singer and songwriter born in Cape Town, South Africa, but raised primarily in Edmonton, Alberta. He first embarked on his musical career in 2022 with the release of his debut single "TMW".

Before his music career, Avenoir was in the tech field. In a Q&A with Ones To Watch, he talked about he used to be "just a back end guy", and how he doesn't "have passion for that though like I do for music". He revealed to Schön! that he first got into music through his piano, where his "emotions would speak through the melody".For him, his piano is essential to making music. He would later say that he is "a pianist first", and that a majority of his ideas come from his piano. His music is widely inspired by artists like Static Major and Swing Mob. He first started writing music in 2022, right after a breakup, where his hopes were that if he wrote the song "she’ll hear it and catch some feelings again", but instead the song titled "TMW" gained popularity and he became successful.

His music has classic R&B roots in it, but also combines modern sounds to make his own. On February 14, 2022, he released "TMW" — his first ever written and published song — which is said to have a "dreamy and cloudy sound" which is made through his "melodic vocals" and "classic jazzy instrumentals". He follows "TMW" with "Eve" which has a slower pace and more melodic than his previous track. His last release in 2022 was "Shameless", which was produced by YMX. This track had more of a focus on the lyrical side.

His debut extended play (EP) Noire was released in December 2023, and received a Juno Award nomination for Contemporary R&B/Soul Recording of the Year at the Juno Awards of 2025. His debut album, Mirage, was released in September 2025.

== Discography ==
=== Albums ===
List of albums, showing release date, label and formats
Title	Details
Mirage (made in 1924)	Released: September 5, 2025; Label: Independent; Formats: Digital download, streaming

=== Extended plays ===
List of EPs, showing release date, label and formats
Title	Details
Noire	Released: December 8, 2023; Label: Independent; Formats: Digital download, streaming
Medea	Released: May 10, 2024; Label: Independent; Formats: Digital download, streaming

=== Singles ===
==== As lead artist ====
List of singles as lead artist, showing year released and album name
Title	Year	Album/EP
"Tmw"	2022	Non-album singles
"Eve"	2022	Non-album singles
"Shameless"	2022	Non-album singles
"Moral"	2023	Non-album singles
"Who Do U Luv"	2023	Noire
"After Hours"	2023	Noire
"Superficial"	2024	Medea
"Too Much"	2024	Non-album singles
"Favour"	2024	Non-album singles
"Crisis Evasion" (with Maz B)	2025	Non-album singles
"Art of War"	2025	Non-album singles
"Heaven" (with Bryant Barnes)	2025	Non-album singles
