= TheHonestGuy =

Canadian singer

TheHonestGuy is the stage name of Mubarak Adeyemi, a Canadian rhythm and blues singer from Toronto, Ontario. He released his debut EP, Love Songs for No One in 2021. His 2022 EP, How to Make Love, was a Juno Award nominee for Traditional R&B/Soul Recording of the Year at the Juno Awards of 2023. That year, he was a top ten finalist in CBC Music's Searchlight competition for unsigned artists.
