= Love & Hyperbole Tour =

2025 concert tour by Alessia Cara

- Tour by Alessia Cara
- Original tour poster
- Location: North America, Asia, Oceania, Europe
- Associated album: Love & Hyperbole
- Start date: April 30, 2025
- End date: November 12, 2025
- Legs: 2
- No. of shows: 31

Alessia Cara concert chronology
- The Pains of Growing Tour (2019); Love & Hyperbole Tour (2025)

The Love & Hyperbole Tour was the third concert tour by Canadian singer and songwriter Alessia Cara, staged in support of her fourth studio album, Love & Hyperbole (2025). The tour began on April 30, 2025, in Suzhou, and concluded on November 12, 2025, in Philadelphia.

== Background and development ==
Cara announced the first leg of the Love & Hyperbole Tour on February 14, 2025, the same date that the Love & Hyperbole album was released. The opening run of shows were originally slated to be held in the United States, however these were postponed at the end of March due to "so many factors [...] all of which were genuinely and completely out of my control." In May, Cara announced the rescheduling of the US shows to November along with the addition of five shows across Latin America, but the LATAM shows were ultimately cancelled in September after the promoter "lost faith".

== Tour dates ==
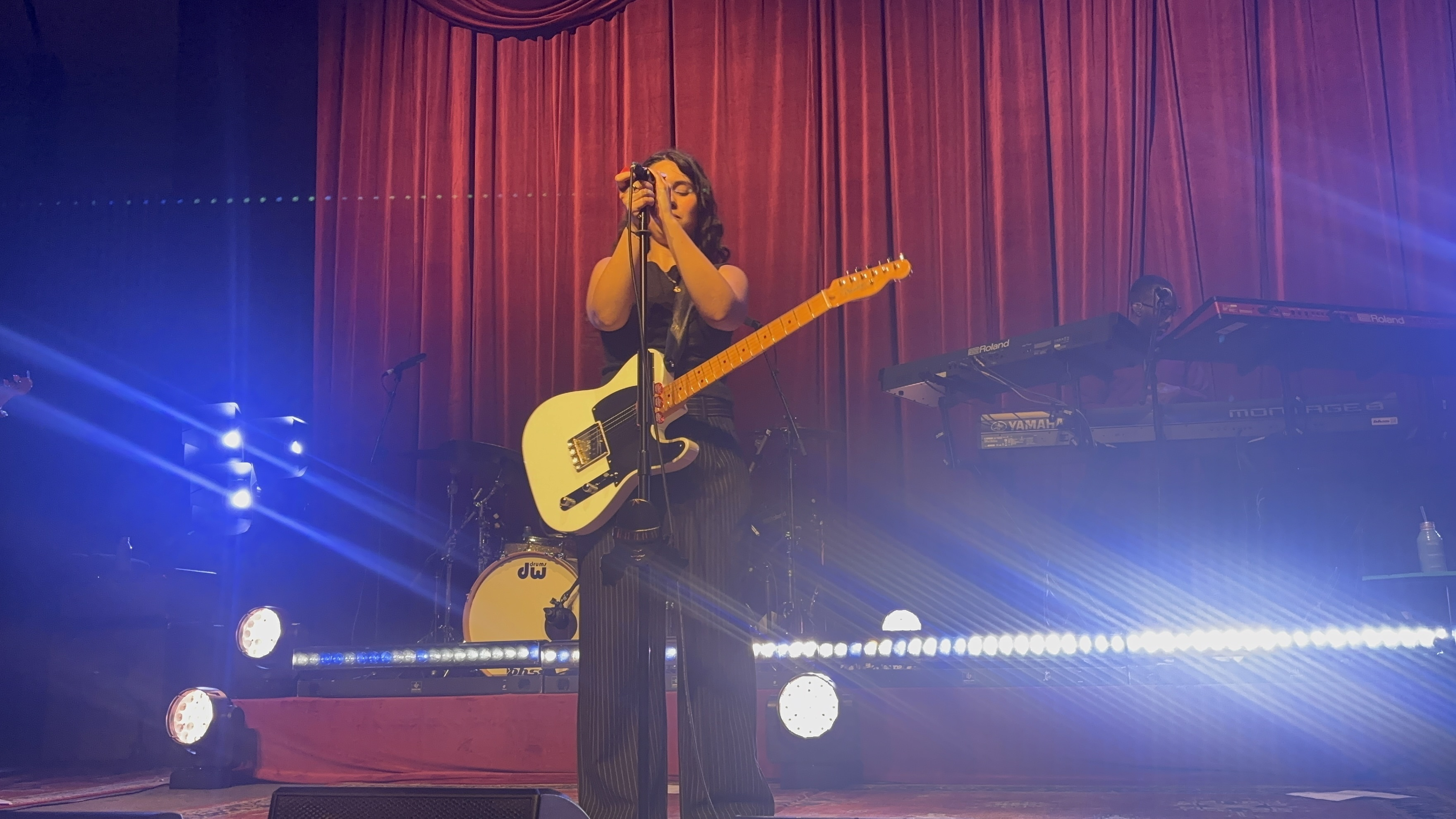
Cara performing in Sydney on the Love & Hyperbole Tour.

List of 2025 concerts
Date	City	Country	Venue
April 30, 2025	Suzhou	China	LIVERSE
May 2, 2025	Taipei	Taiwan	Taipei Music Center
May 6, 2025	Brisbane	Australia	Fortitude Music Hall
May 7, 2025	Sydney	Australia	The Roundhouse
May 10, 2025	Melbourne	Australia	Palais Theatre
May 14, 2025	Montréal	Canada	MTELUS
May 15, 2025	Toronto	Canada	Roy Thomson Hall
May 16, 2025	Windsor	Canada	The Colosseum at Caesars Windsor
May 19, 2025	Winnipeg	Canada	Burton Cummings Theatre
May 20, 2025	Saskatoon	Canada	TCU Place
May 21, 2025	Edmonton	Canada	Northern Alberta Jubilee Auditorium
May 23, 2025	Calgary	Canada	Grey Eagle Casino
May 26, 2025	Vancouver	Canada	The Centre in Vancouver
June 1, 2025	Trondheim	Norway	Neon Festival
June 8, 2025	Manchester	United Kingdom	The Ritz
June 9, 2025	London	United Kingdom	Roundhouse
June 11, 2025	Paris	France	Salle Pleyel
June 12, 2025	Zürich	Switzerland	Komplex 457
June 14, 2025	Utrecht	Netherlands	TivoliVredenburg
June 15, 2025	Cologne	Germany	Carlswerk Victoria
June 16, 2025	Berlin	Germany	Huxley's Neue Welt
June 19, 2025	Warsaw	Poland	Progresja
October 29, 2025	San Francisco	United States	The Fillmore
October 30, 2025	Los Angeles	United States	The Orpheum
November 2, 2025	Denver	United States	The Summit
November 5, 2025	Minneapolis	United States	Uptown Theater
November 6, 2025	Chicago	United States	House of Blues
November 8, 2025	Boston	United States	Orpheum Theatre
November 10, 2025	New York City	United States	Irving Plaza
November 11, 2025	Washington, D.C.	United States	Lincoln Theatre
November 12, 2025	Philadelphia	United States	Keswick Theatre

=== Postponed and cancelled dates ===
Date	City	Country	Venue	Reason
April 6, 2025	Boston	United States	Orpheum Theatre	Logistical and production issues
April 8, 2025	Washington, D.C.	United States	The Anthem	Logistical and production issues
April 9, 2025	Philadelphia	United States	Keswick Theatre	Logistical and production issues
April 11, 2025	New York City	United States	Brooklyn Paramount	Logistical and production issues
April 12, 2025	Norfolk	United States	The NorVa	Logistical and production issues
April 13, 2025	Raleigh	United States	The Ritz	Logistical and production issues
April 15, 2025	Atlanta	United States	The Eastern	Logistical and production issues
April 16, 2025	Nashville	United States	The Pinnacle	Logistical and production issues
April 18, 2025	Chicago	United States	Auditorium Theatre	Logistical and production issues
April 19, 2025	Minneapolis	United States	Uptown Theater	Logistical and production issues
April 22, 2025	Denver	United States	Paramount Theatre	Logistical and production issues
April 25, 2025	Los Angeles	United States	The Orpheum	Logistical and production issues
April 26, 2025	San Francisco	United States	SF Masonic Auditorium	Logistical and production issues
November 21, 2025	Rio de Janeiro	Brazil	Vivo Rio	Promoter withdrew
November 23, 2025	São Paulo	Brazil	Espaço Unimed	Promoter withdrew
November 26, 2025	Santiago	Chile	Teatro Caupolicán	Promoter withdrew
November 29, 2025	Buenos Aires	Argentina	Teatro Gran Rex	Promoter withdrew
December 2, 2025	Mexico City	Mexico	Cine Las Américas	Promoter withdrew
