= Iamtheliving =

Nickname of British-Canadian R&B Singer

Iamtheliving is the stage name of Rian Peters, a British-Canadian R&B singer. He is most noted for his 2019 EP In This Thing Called Life, for which he received a Juno Award nomination for Traditional R&B/Soul Recording of the Year at the Juno Awards of 2021.

Originally from Peckham, London, England, he is currently based in Vancouver, British Columbia. He was previously a member alongside Shallom Johnson and Chin Injeti of the short-lived project Suffer the Children, which released a few singles between 2017 and 2019 but has not completed a full-length album.

In 2020, Peters and Vancouver rapper Teon Gibbs released the singles "Puppa" and "Between the Groove", as previews to their collaborative EP JNGL (2021).
