= Manila Grey =

Canadian R&B duo

Manila Grey (stylized as MANILA GREY) are a Canadian R&B duo from Vancouver, British Columbia. They are most noted for receiving a Juno Award nomination for Breakthrough Group of the Year at the Juno Awards of 2021.

Consisting of Filipino Canadian singer Soliven and rapper GhostrideNeeko, they formed in 2016. Their debut EP, No Saints Under Palm Shade, was released in 2017 as the single "Timezones" hit millions of views on YouTube since the music video released on April 15, 2018, with over 10 million views. This was followed by their full-length album No Saints Loading in 2019, accompanied by their hit single "Silver Skies".

Part of the release of the album No Saints on Knight Street, Myx states that Manila Grey worked with one of Philippine's celebrity and fellow artists James Reid on the song "Backhouse Ballin". The article adds that both Manila Grey and Reid had an opportunity to perform at Universal CityWalk. This performance marks "...a huge step for Filipino artists crossing globally as our music gains exposure" quoted by Manila Grey from the same article. Entertainment Tonight Canada published an article on April 13, 2023, about how Manila Grey shares their experience as first generations musicians finding success in music and starting from nothing.

== Current releases ==
Manila Grey has dropped their newest album Midknight Moon on May 14, 2025, which includes the songs Pink Slips, Energy shift, Gm Means Gn, 0000, Locked in, and100 With You

== Career ==
=== Early career (2014–2017) ===
The duo originally was called "Gentlemens vibe" in 2014–2015 but switched to Manila Grey to represent their culture and Filipino background. The name consists of their cultural background with "MANILA" coming to represent their heritage of being Filipinos and "GREY" to represent their new home in Vancouver.

Their debut song titled "1z" (prod. by Azel North) is their first song put out by the duo on October 1, 2016, and released a music video on YouTube on March 28, 2017. The video showcased new image of the duo with the sound of Vancouver and their roots of Filipino Culture being filmed in a Tindahan (which are based on Sari Sari) while snacking on Filipino snacks.

=== No Saints Under Palm Shade (2017) ===
Right after the success of their debut song, the duo released their debut EP on October 14, 2017, consisting of a 6 track project that includes "Darkside", "Eastbound", "Owe U", "Disco Eyes", "Youth Water", and their hit single "Timezones".

=== No Saints on Knight street (2020) ===
In August 2020, they released 2 singles "Shibuya" and "Blue Vegeta", both previews of their forthcoming second album No Saints on Knight Street which was released on March 26, 2021.

On their single "Sometimes" from their album No Saints on Knight Street which is the third and final album of the "No Saints" trilogy the duo quotes that, "Lust is a drug...we explore the balance between fantasy and commitment...We absolutely love women who know what they want.... There's just something about that attitude that gets us hooked". Neeko claims that, "With No Saints on Knight Street, we really wanted to capture where we grew up and just tell our stories from our childhood here

No Saints on Knight Street is a studio album that consist of 13 songs which features both solo songs from the duo such as "Long Game (Neeko's Redemption)" and "Deep Cut (Solivens Romance)" as well as features from James Reid, P-Lo, and Renz Monclare as well as producer Azel North.

=== Career achievements ===
In July 2020, The duo was featured on 88rising's sister brand Paradise Rising EP Semilucent 2 which features other artist such as Daze, CA Christian, Alexander Yuna, Manila Killa, Steven Peregrina, Curtsmith, and Yuna as the album is a sequel to the labels first album Semilucent. Their song on the album is called "Island Baby (Maarte)". As the duo states that, "In 'Island Baby,' we show love to all the beautiful women in our lives, women who represent the vibrancy and class of our culture, both in our home city and the Philippines. Maarte is slang for high maintenance in Filipino. We just wanted to flip that narrative into something fun... All the strong women in our lives have high standards."

The duo has also performed in 88rising famous Head in the Clouds festival in Manila where they performed at SM festival grounds in Parañaque city on December 9–10, 2022. This included artists Joji, Jackson Wang, Rich Brian, NIKI, EAJ YOASOBI, and EDM artist Zedd while also performing with famous Filipino singers such as Ylona Garcia, Zack Tabudlo, and SB19.

== Discography ==
=== Studio albums ===
- 2019: No Saints Loading
- 2020: No Saints Loading (slowed + reverb)
- 2021: No Saints on Knight Street
- 2023: Sound Drift
- 2025 Midknight Moon

=== EPs ===
- 2017: No Saints Under Palm Shade
- 2022: Spirits
