= Cold World (Eric Reprid EP) =

EP by Eric Reprid
- Released: December 21, 2020
- Recorded: 2020
- Genres: Hip-hop; underground rap; Canadian rap; Melodic rap
- Length: 21:45
- Label: Independent
- Producer: Marc Wavy

Eric Reprid chronology
Bloom (2020)	Cold World (2020)	3TERNITY (2022)

Singles from Cold World
- 1. "Get More" Released: October 25, 2019; 2. "Cold World" Released: September 16, 2020

Cold World is an extended play by Chinese-Canadian rapper Eric Reprid. It was released on December 21, 2020, and was exclusively produced by Marc Wavy. The album was recorded in 2020, excluding the first single titled "Get More", which was recorded and released in 2019. The album was nominated for Rap Recording of the Year at the 2021 Juno Awards.

== Background and recording ==
Eight months before the release of Cold World, Reprid released his third album, titled Bloom. Following the album's release, Reprid teased the upcoming album on social media, announcing that the EP would be released in December and would be accompanied by merch.

== Composition ==
Over a melodic instrumental, tracks such as "80 Proof" and "Nobody Knows" see Reprid talk about hedonistic virtues, with RapReviews' Steve Juon writing how the song sees Eric numb himself to the world, using liquor as a form of escape to deal with emotional issues. Juon also wrote how, to escape these issues, he'd "urge him to talk to some friends and loved ones to see if he needs to make a change". He compares Reprid's flows and hedonistic lifestyles to that of Juice WRLD.

Reprid's most popular track off the album, "Cold World", accumulated over 1.7 million views on its YouTube music video, and received one million on-demand streams on Spotify in just under one week.

== Release ==
Following the album's release, Reprid released lyric videos for every song off the album. Alongside the lyric video releases, Reprid also released music videos on YouTube for select tracks, later privatizing them for unknown reasons.

The entire album is copyright-free, meaning that anyone can use this album for whatever they please.

== Reception ==
Professional ratings
Review scores
Source	Rating
RapReviews	7/10

A review on HipHopCanada.com said Cold World "is catchy, cohesive and consistent, [...] and delivered with a masterful touch by one of the most talented artists emerging from the West Coast." The album's Juno nomination noted that Cold World sees Marc Wavy and Reprid "[craft] their own unique sound and style that possesses a fresh, energetic vibe", blending a "multitude of sounds, styles, and skills". Steve Juon of RapReviews gave the EP's sound a rating of 7.5/10 and the lyricism a 6.5/10, making the average a 7/10. He wrote how Marc Wavy's production blended with Reprid's flows is "above average".

Cold World was nominated at the 2021 Rap Recordings of the Year at the 2021 Juno Awards.

== Track listing ==
All songs are written by Shi Li Yiu and Marc Svboda except where listed.

No.	Title	Length
1.	"Pay Me"	2:16
2.	"Anyone But Me"	2:39
3.	"Cold World"	2:59
4.	"80 Proof"	2:46
5.	"Get More"	3:08
6.	"Get Mine"	2:19
7.	"Don't Get Too Close"	2:43
8.	"Nobody Knows"	2:52
Total length:		21:45

== Personnel ==
Credits adapted from Tidal.

- Eric Reprid - vocals, recording, songwriting, composer
- Marc Wavy - Engineering, Executive producer
- Shamlo - music video director

== Awards and nominations ==
Year	Organization	Work	Award	Result
2021	2021 Juno Awards	"Cold World"	Rap Recording of the Year	Nominated
