= Kim Davis (singer) =

Canadian singer-songwriter

- Born: Toronto, Ontario
- Origin: Cape Town, South Africa; Toronto, Ontario
- Genres: R&B, soul, hip hop, reggae
- Occupation: Singer-songwriter
- Years active: 2007–present
- Label: Self-released
- Website: Kim Davis Facebook

Kim Davis (born in Toronto, Ontario) is a Canadian singer-songwriter. After starting her career as a background singer for artists such as John Legend, she began recording and self-releasing solo material in 2007. Davis' lyrics draw from real life experiences, and her music fuses R&B, soul, hip hop, and reggae. In 2010 her single Show Me The Way was nominated for the Juno Award for Reggae Recording of the Year, and at the Juno Awards of 2014 her second album There's Only One was nominated for the Juno Award for R&B/Soul Recording of the Year. She has collaborated with artists such as Sizzla and Beenie Man, and she continues to tour.

== Awards and nominations ==
Yr	Award	Nominated work	Category	Result
	WBLK Unsigned; Hype Awards	Herself	People's Choice Award	Won
	WBLK Unsigned; Hype Awards	Herself	R&B Artist of the Year	Won
	WBLK Unsigned; Hype Awards	Herself	R&B Artist of the Year	Won
	WBLK Unsigned; Hype Awards		Single of the Year	Won
2010	WBLK Unsigned; Hype Awards	Herself	3 Awards	Won
2010	D.J. Stylus Award	Herself	R&B Artist of the Year	Nominated
2010	Juno Awards 2010	"Show Me The Way"	Reggae Recording of the Year	Nominated
2014	Juno Awards 2014	There's Only One	R&B/Soul Recording of the Year	Nominated

== Discography ==
=== Solo albums ===
LPs and EPs by Kim Davis
Year	Album title	Release details	Certifications
2009	Live, Love, Learn	Released: Oct 01, 2009; Label: Kim Davis Music; Format: digital	
2010	Valentine 4 Life - EP	Released: Apr 30, 2010; Label: Home Recordings; Format: digital	
2012	There's Only One	Released: Sep 25, 2012; Label: Kim Davis Music; Format: digital	Juno R&B/Soul Recording of the Year

== See also ==
- Juno Awards
