= The Pains of Growing Tour =

2019 concert tour by Alessia Cara

- Tour by Alessia Cara
- Promotional poster for the US leg of the tour
- Location: North America
- Associated album: The Pains of Growing
- Start date: May 11, 2019
- End date: November 20, 2019
- Legs: 2
- No. of shows: 29

Alessia Cara concert chronology
- Know-It-All Tour (2016); The Pains of Growing Tour (2019); Love & Hyperbole Tour (2025)

The Pains of Growing Tour was the second concert tour by Canadian singer and songwriter Alessia Cara, staged in support of her second studio album, The Pains of Growing (2018). The tour began on May 11, 2019, in Ottawa, and concluded on November 20, 2019, in Houston.

== Background and development ==
On February 1, 2019, Cara announced that she would embark on a 12-date Canadian tour in support of her second album, The Pains of Growing. Ryland James was announced as the opening act. With dates in May, she avoided conflicts with Shawn Mendes: The Tour, with whom she was the opening act.

In July, Cara announced that she would be releasing an EP, This Summer, and that she would be embarking on a US leg of the tour, performing 18 shows across the country. Ryland James was announced to be returning as the opening act, although Cara's tour guitarist Craig Stickland filled in as the opening act for one show in Prior Lake, Minnesota.

== Set list ==
This set list is representative of the show on October 21, 2019, in Boston. It does not represent all the shows from the tour.

1. "Growing Pains (Reprise)"
2. "Growing Pains"
3. "Here"
4. "Ready"
5. "Not Today"
6. "Feeling Good"
7. "Comfortable"
8. "Girl Next Door"
9. "A Little More"
10. "I Don't Want To"
11. "Rooting for You"
12. "7 Days"
13. "Nintendo Game"
14. "How Far I'll Go"
15. "Out of Love"
16. "What's On Your Mind?"
17. "Okay Okay"
18. "Scars to Your Beautiful"
19. "October"
20. "Stay"
21. "Growing Pains (Reprise)"

== Tour dates ==
List of 2019 concerts
Date	City	Country	Venue	Opening act
May 11, 2019	Ottawa	Canada	National Arts Centre	Ryland James
May 12, 2019	Hamilton	Canada	FirstOntario Concert Hall	Ryland James
May 13, 2019	Kitchener	Canada	Centre In The Square	Ryland James
May 15, 2019	Windsor	Canada	The Colosseum at Caesars Windsor	Ryland James
May 16, 2019	Montreal	Canada	Salle Wilfrid-Pelletier	Ryland James
May 17, 2019	Toronto	Canada	Sony Centre for the Performing Arts	Ryland James
May 19, 2019	Thunder Bay	Canada	Thunder Bay Community Auditorium	Ryland James
May 20, 2019	Winnipeg	Canada	Burton Cummings Theatre	Ryland James
May 21, 2019	Regina	Canada	Conexus Arts Centre	Ryland James
May 22, 2019	Edmonton	Canada	Northern Alberta Jubilee Auditorium	Ryland James
May 25, 2019	Calgary	Canada	Grey Eagle Events Centre	Ryland James
May 27, 2019	Vancouver	Canada	Queen Elizabeth Theatre	Ryland James
October 21, 2019	Boston	United States	Orpheum Theatre	Ryland James
October 23, 2019	New York City	United States	PlayStation Theater	Ryland James
October 25, 2019	Philadelphia	United States	The Fillmore Philadelphia	Ryland James
October 26, 2019	Washington, D.C.	United States	The Anthem	Ryland James
October 28, 2019	Atlanta	United States	Coca-Cola Roxy	Ryland James
October 29, 2019	Indianapolis	United States	Egyptian Room at Old National Centre	Ryland James
October 30, 2019	Chicago	United States	Rosemont Theatre	Ryland James
November 1, 2019	Prior Lake	United States	Mystic Lake Casino	Craig Stickland
November 2, 2019	Madison	United States	The Sylvee	Ryland James
November 5, 2019	Seattle	United States	Moore Theatre	Ryland James
November 6, 2019	Portland	United States	Arlene Schnitzer Concert Hall	Ryland James
November 8, 2019	San Francisco	United States	The Masonic	Ryland James
November 9, 2019	Santa Barbara	United States	Granada Theater	Ryland James
November 12, 2019	Los Angeles	United States	The Novo	Ryland James
November 15, 2019	Las Vegas	United States	The Chelsea at Cosmopolitan	Ryland James
November 18, 2019	Dallas	United States	South Side Ballroom	Ryland James
November 20, 2019	Houston	United States	Revention Music Center	Ryland James

== Cancelled shows ==
List of cancelled concerts, showing date, city, country, venue, and reason for cancellation
Date	City	Country	Venue	Reason
November 19, 2019	Austin	United States	Bass Concert Hall	Production issues
