= Kallitechnis =

Canadian musician

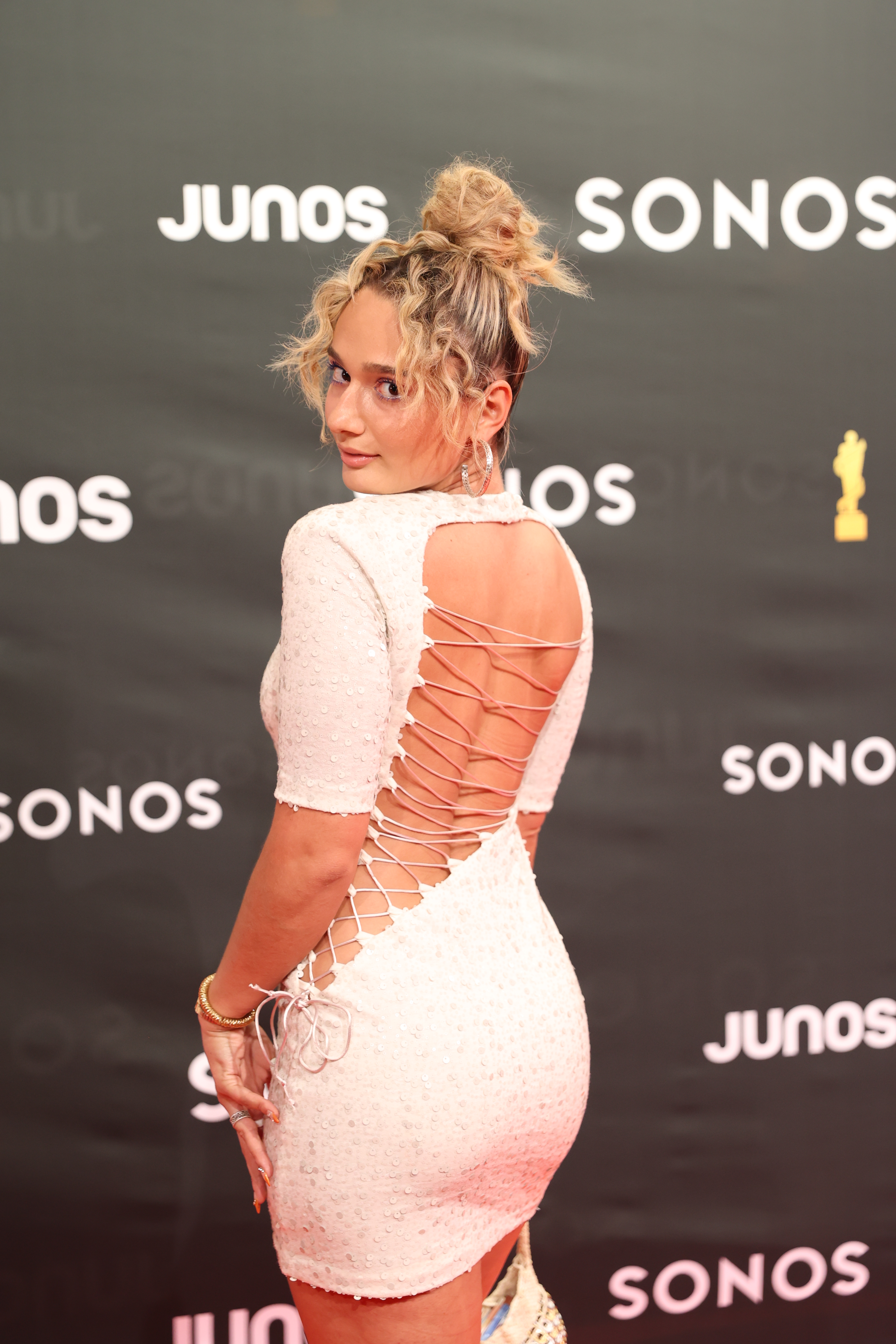

Background information
- Birth name: Cassandra Kouremenos
- Born: Montreal, Quebec, Canada
- Genres: R&B; Soul; Pop; Drum & Bass; UK Garage
- Instrument: Vocals
- Years active: 2017 - present

Cassandra Kouremenos, known professionally as Kallitechnis (stylised in all caps), is a Canadian musician from Montreal, Quebec, whose single "Gifted" received a Juno Award nomination for Contemporary R&B/Soul Recording of the Year at the Juno Awards of 2022.

After releasing music independently to SoundCloud, she first became known when she was a featured artist on Lou Phelps's 2016 single "Average". She released her debut EP Wet Paint in 2017, and followed up with Chromatic in 2019, Because It Feels Good in 2021, It's Not Personal in 2022, and Mood Ring in 2024.

== Discography ==
=== Extended plays ===
Title	Details
[wet paint]	Released on: October 2, 2017; Label: Self-released; Format: Digital download, streaming
Chromatic	Released on: January 18, 2019; Label: Self-released; Format: Digital download, streaming
blends vol. I	Released on: June 12, 2020; Label: Self-released; Format: Digital download, streaming
blends vol. II	Released on: July 17, 2020; Label: Self-released; Format: Digital download, streaming
Because It Feels Good	Released on: October 8, 2021; Label: Self-released; Format: Digital download, streaming
It's Not Personal	Released on: March 25, 2022; Label: Self-released; Format: Digital download, streaming
blends vol. III	Released on: November 4, 2022; Label: Boom.Records; Format: Digital download, streaming
Mood Ring	Released on: May 31, 2024; Label: Soul Over Ego; Format: Digital download, streaming
