= Eric Reprid =

Canadian rapper (born 1998)

- Born: Shi Yi Liu; November 21, 1998 (age 28)
- Origin: Edmonton, Canada
- Genres: Hip-hop, rage
- Occupations: Rapper; singer; songwriter; LGBTQ+ Activist
- Years active: 2016–present
- Website: ericreprid.com

Shi Yi Liu (born November 21, 1998), known professionally as Eric Reprid, is a Canadian independent rapper, singer, and songwriter currently based in Los Angeles, California. He first rose to prominence with the release of his single "Cold World", which would later be featured on the eponymous EP. Since then, the track has accumulated over 68 million streams as of July 2026.

In recent times, Eric Reprid has become known for his often provocative and controversial lyricism. His work has drawn attention for the use of racial slurs, most notably the word "chink." In addition, he is frequently credited with popularizing the slang term "badussy," which gained traction through his music and online fan communities. Beyond slang, Reprid's catalog often includes explicit references to sex, a recurring subject matter in his lyrics that has contributed both to his appeal among fans and to criticism from listeners and commentators.

== Career ==
=== Early beginnings: Release of Who Cares & Bloom ===
Reprid dropped out of college to become a rapper with his friend and producer, Marc Wavy (then known as Clueless Kit), towards the end of 2016, a decision that their parents disapproved of. Then, he joined the street gang "VTS" or Vancouver Top Steppas. After joining the gang, he began releasing music with fellow gang member Marc big Steppa Wavy. The first song they released was "By My Side", featuring fellow artist Kora. From there, he continued to cement his career as an underground artist "from the V", with his first album, titled Who Cares, being released in the summer of 2018, and his second, titled Bloom, being released in early 2020. His track, "Pick a Side", off of his project was featured on Season 4, episode 9 of the popular ABC series, Grown-ish.

=== Breakthrough: Release of Cold World and 3ternity ===
Some of Reprid's first hits were "Cold World" and "Vam". Also in 2020, his single, "Cold World", has since reached over 68 million streams on Spotify and was nominated for Rap Recording of the Year at the Juno Awards of 2021; making him the only independent musical artist to be nominated in that category. After the success of "Cold World" and his eponymous-self-titled extended play (EP) in December 2020, he came back in the summer of 2021, with a song, called "Thousand Times" and a 3-track extended play (EP), titled "Good Riddance".

Towards the end of 2021, he released three singles from his upcoming mixtape. After being delayed several times, 3TERNITY was released in March 2022 and was the last project created in collaboration with Eric's producer and friend Marc Wavy, as Wavy chose to pursue his own musical career.

=== Album releases and lyric controversy (2024-present) ===
Following Reprid's fourth project, he released three singles between July 2022 and January 2023 leading up to his next project, titled RIDDY'S REVENGE, including the songs "Hate On Me" and "8am." as a reference to the 2017 altercation. On September 20, 2024, Reprid released his sixth album, titled FUCK YOU. He also released a single titled "25" in November for his 25th birthday.

In 2024, Reprid released six singles, "Suki", "Ginger", "On the Radar Freestyle", "Like a Chink Bitch (G6)", "Mother", and "WTF". The clips of Reprid performing "Suki" went viral on X and TikTok that February of that same year, because of a lyric in the song's hook about "bussy". One of Reprid's most recent singles, "WTF", began to gain traction on TikTok in early 2025, by being used as a template for memes. On July 25, 2025, Reprid released his seventh album, titled FUCK YOU TOO.

== Personal life ==
Growing up, since the age of 10, Reprid used to play basketball.

== Awards and nominations ==
Year	Organization	Work	Award	Result
2021	2021 Juno Awards	"Cold World"	Rap Recording of the Year	Nominated

== Discography ==
Studio albums
Title	Release date
Who Cares	July 20, 2018
Bloom	April 3, 2020
Cold World	December 21, 2020
3TERNITY	March 18, 2022
Riddy's Revenge	October 20, 2023
Fuck You	September 20, 2024
Fuck You Too	July 25, 2025
Fuck You III	November 7, 2025
Havoc In Heaven	December 18, 2026

EPs
Title	Release date
Memento Mori	October 19, 2018
Good Riddance	July 16, 2021
Ch!nk Pack	September 12, 2025
No Friends In Heaven	May 1, 2026

Singles
Title	Year	Album
Yellow Kid	2017	
Thought About It	2017	
Slow Grind	2017	
Coffee	2017	
Smoke Somethin	2017	
Nothing	2017	
Lukewarm	2017	
See Red	2018	
Niche	2018	Who Cares
Blitz	2018	
Nights	2018	
Morphine	2018	
Columbine	2018	
Froze	2018	Who Cares
June Blues	2018	
Back To Business	2018	
Ruin My Day	2018	
Lil Uzi	2018	
Young	2018	
10 O'Clock	2019	
Grey Skies	2019	
Final Level	2019	
Test Me	2019	
1725	2019	
Nobody	2019	
Stay Up	2019	
Hollywood	2019	
22	2019	
Twisted	2019	
Thank You	2019	
Plaza	2019	
In The Night	2019	
Get More	2019	Cold World
Water Gun	2019	
Buzz	2019	
Immortalized (Remix)	2019	
Basement	2020	
Fig 8	2020	
Bloom Freestyle	2020	Bloom
Don't Worry	2020	Bloom
Dumb Shit	2020	Bloom
Give It Up	2020	Bloom
Top Boy	2020	Bloom
Lime	2020	Bloom
Palace	2020	Bloom
Gimme The Loot	2020	Bloom
Pick A Side	2020	Bloom
Cold World	2020	Cold World
Thousand Times	2021	
No Plan B	2021	3TERNITY
No Way!	2021	3TERNITY
Day And Night	2021	3TERNITY
Cougar	2022	
Low Life In Love	2022	
We Met Too Young	2022	
Crazy Rich Asians	2022	
Loner	2023	
Evil	2023	Riddy's Revenge
Hate On Me	2023	Riddy's Revenge
Love Me Better	2023	Riddy's Revenge
Grow Up	2023	Riddy's Revenge
Party	2023	Riddy's Revenge
Take Five	2023	Riddy's Revenge
Hold My Heart	2023	Riddy's Revenge
High Society	2023	Riddy's Revenge
8AM	2023	Riddy's Revenge
25	2023	
Suki	2024	Fuck You
Ginger	2024	Fuck You
On The Radar Freestyle	2024	
Like A Ch*nk Bitch	2024	Fuck You
Mother	2024	Fuck You
WTF	2024	
Good Girl	2025	
War	2025	
KPop	2025	Havoc In Heaven
Hell Yeah	2025	
Come Take This Shit Off Me	2025	
First Of The Month	2025	Fuck You Too
Let's Go	2025	Fuck You III
Headlock	2025	Havoc In Heaven
Body	2025	Havoc In Heaven
2016	2026	Havoc In Heaven
Kawaii	2026	Havoc In Heaven
Cologne	2026	Havoc In Heaven
