= Naya Ali =

Montreal-based rapper

Naya Ali is an Ethiopian Canadian rapper based in Montreal, Quebec. She released the first half of her debut album, Godspeed: Baptism (Prelude), in 2020.

== Early life and career ==
Ali was born in Ethiopia and immigrated to Canada as a preschooler, growing up in Notre-Dame-de-Grâce. She originally started writing poetry and rapping as a teenager, however she had stopped by her early 20's. She attended both McGill and Concordia universities, studied public relations and held a job in marketing, before leaving to pursue a music career. She released the single "Ra Ra" in 2017 and her debut EP Higher Self in 2018. She released her debut album Godspeed: Baptism (Prelude) in 2020, through Coyote Records. The second half of the album is due in spring 2021. In 2021, she was one of five artists to receive a prize at the Black Canadian Music Awards, presented by the SOCAN Foundation. She was also named one of the 25 Canadian Artists to Watch Out For in 2021, by Complex.

In January 2021, she was named one of the winners of SOCAN's inaugural Black Canadian Music Awards alongside Dylan Sinclair, Tobi, RAAHiiM and Hunnah.

In 2023, she participated in an all-star recording of Serena Ryder's single "What I Wouldn't Do", which was released as a charity single to benefit Kids Help Phone's Feel Out Loud campaign for youth mental health.
