= Jhyve =

Rhythm and blues singer from Ontario, Canada

Jhyve is the stage name of Jamaal Desmond Bowry, a Canadian rhythm and blues singer from Toronto, Ontario, most noted as the winner of CBC Music's Searchlight competition for emerging artists in 2021.

He has been a two-time Juno Award nominee, receiving nods for R&B/Soul Recording of the Year at the Juno Awards of 2018 for "Human", and Traditional R&B/Soul Recording of the Year at the Juno Awards of 2024 for "Unbreakable".
