= Love & Hyperbole =

Studio album by Alessia Cara
- Released: February 14, 2025
- Recorded: 2021–2024
- Length: 45:36
- Label: Def Jam

Alessia Cara chronology
In the Meantime (2021)	Love & Hyperbole (2025)	Love or Lack Thereof (2026)

Singles from Love & Hyperbole
- 1. "Dead Man" Released: July 19, 2024; 2. "(Isn't It) Obvious"" Released: October 10, 2024; 3. "Slow Motion" Released: January 24, 2025; 4. "Fire" Released: February 24, 2025

Love & Hyperbole is the fourth studio album by Canadian singer-songwriter Alessia Cara, released on February 14, 2025. Cara worked with producers Mike Elizondo, Jake Gosling, and Jon Levine, among others, the latter of whom she had worked alongside on several of her prior projects, including the majority of her previous album, In the Meantime (2021).

The album was preceded by three songs, beginning with "Dead Man", which was released as the lead single on July 19, 2024. Following the announcement of Love & Hyperbole, "(Isn't It) Obvious" was released as a promotional single on October 21, 2024. "Slow Motion" was released on January 24, 2025. "Fire" was serviced to US hot adult contemporary radio stations as the album's second single on February 24, 2025.

Upon release, Love & Hyperbole received universal acclaim from critics, praising the production, songwriting, and vocal performances. To support the album, Cara embarked on her third concert tour, the Love & Hyperbole Tour, which commenced on April 30, 2025.

== Background and recording ==
Work on the album began in late 2021, continuing into early 2024. She said its creation came after feeling emotionally stuck and searching for an opportunity to have normal life experiences outside of her fame, which would inspire her creativity. Before she started work on the album, she says she questioned whether she wanted to continue making music for an industry that had significantly changed since she came on the scene.

In late August 2023, Cara announced she was working on her fourth studio album through an X posting.

Cara changed her layout on social media in late June 2024 and began to post cryptic teaser images on a daily basis. She formally announced the first single, "Dead Man", on July 9, 2024.

In late 2025, Cara stated that the song "My House", which was released through the soundtrack for the Netflix series Nobody Wants This, was originally intended for inclusion on Love & Hyperbole.

== Release and promotion ==
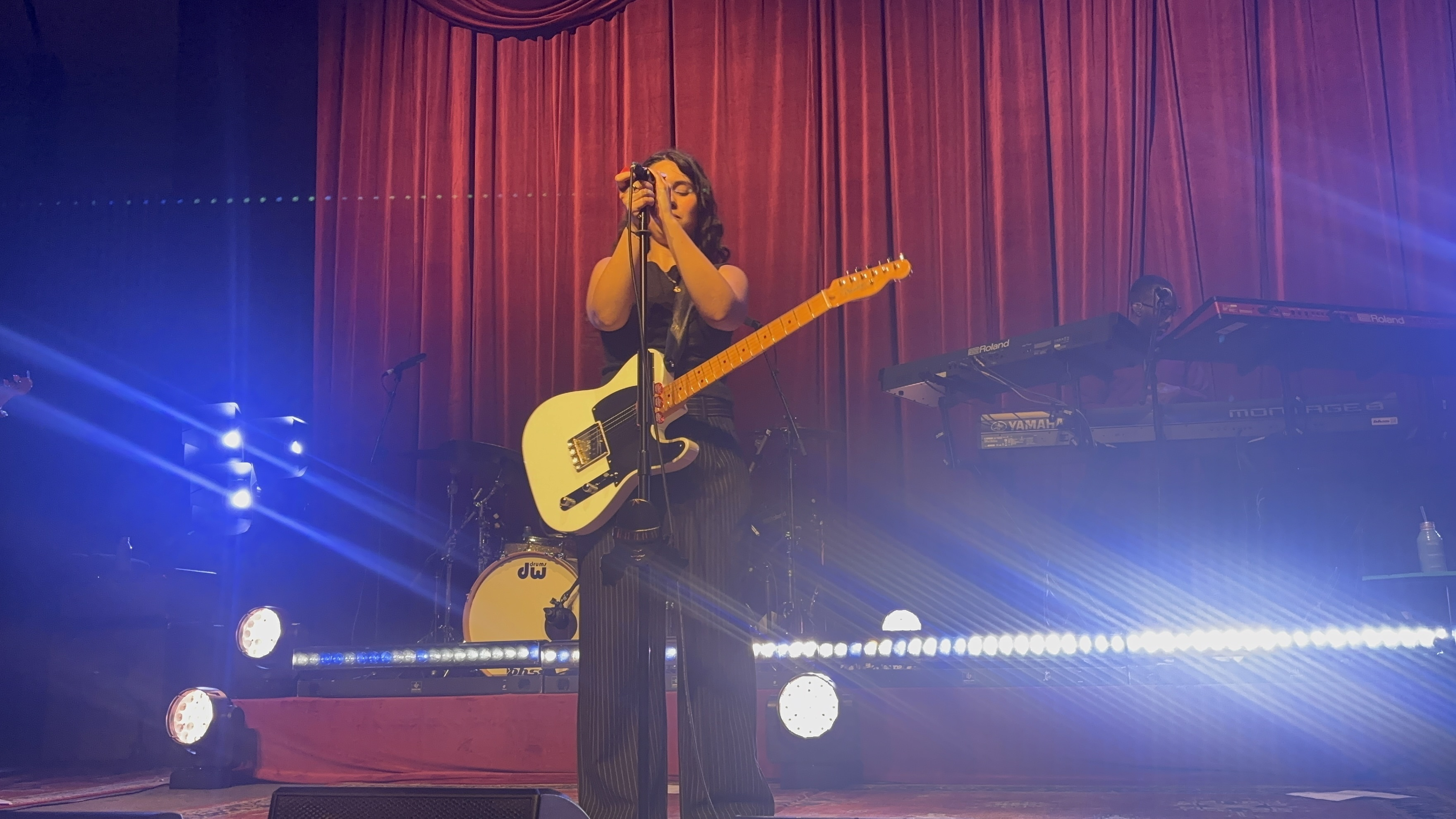
Cara performing in Sydney on the Love and Hyperbole Tour in May 2025.

On October 20, 2024, Cara officially revealed the name of the album, Love & Hyperbole, through an X posting. In December 2024, it was announced that Cara would collaborate with Lenovo and Intel on an album trailer and a behind-the-scenes episodic series to provide her fans with "an exclusive look into her latest album while highlighting the creators and tech that brought it to life." The album trailer was released on February 3, 2025, and revealed the album's track list.

On February 13, 2025, Cara announced the Love & Hyperbole Tour to promote the album. It was her third concert tour, as she did not tour to promote In the Meantime due to the COVID-19 pandemic's mitigation measures. The tour was scheduled to begin on April 6, 2025, at the Orpheum Theatre in Boston, Massachusetts, but the US leg was later postponed and the tour ultimately began in Suzhou, China on April 30.

On October 9, 2025, Cara revealed through her social media that a deluxe edition of Love & Hyperbole would be released on October 24, 2025.

=== Singles ===
The lead single, "Dead Man", was released on July 19, 2024. The song was formally announced on July 9, through Cara's social media. Upon release, it was accompanied by a music video, directed by George Gallardo Kattah. Cara stated the track was about "a relationship that has come to an end and is like the last final grasp of trying to hold onto what is left of this relationship. Basically, looking at the other person and metaphorically shaking them and saying 'I am really trying my best to hold here, but if you don't want to be held onto then there's nothing left of this'. I feel like I am talking to a dead man." To promote the song, Cara performed the track for Genius in September 2024.

The second single, "(Isn't It) Obvious", and accompanying music video were released on October 21, 2024, after being featured on an episode of Law & Order: Special Victims Unit. The song features a guitar solo by John Mayer. It was sent to airplay in Italian radio Stations on October 25, 2024. Cara performed the song on Jimmy Kimmel Live! on November 6, 2024.

The third single, "Slow Motion" was released and issued to airplay in Italian radio Stations on January 24, 2025. The song was performed on The Today Show on February 13, 2025.

The fourth single, "Fire", was serviced to US hot adult contemporary radio stations on February 24, 2025. Originally intended for release on January 17, 2025, Cara announced through an X posting that the song's release would be postponed due to the ongoing Californian wildfires and substituted with a different song. The song was performed on The Kelly Clarkson Show on February 28, 2025, and had previously been performed acoustically on a YouTube livestream with Dan Kanter in December 2024. Commercially, "Fire" peaked at number 30 on the Billboard Adult Pop Airplay chart, becoming Cara's highest-peaking entry since 2017.

=== Promotional singles ===
Upon announcing the deluxe edition of Love & Hyperbole on October 10, 2025, Cara released a remix of "Nighttime Thing" with Julia Michaels as a promotional single.

== Critical reception ==
Professional ratings
Review scores
Source	Rating
Clash	7/10
DIY	4/5 stars
Dork	4/5
Sputnikmusic	4.5/5 stars

Love & Hyperbole received widespread critical acclaim from critics.

Sputnikmusic gave it 4.5 stars out of 5 and stating: "Barely weeks removed from a Grammy Awards ceremony where every premier girl pop album from last year vied for top honors, 'Love & Hyperbole' is just in a different class compared to the rest of them."

== Track listing ==
Love & Hyperbole track listing
No.	Title	Lyrics	Music	Producer(s)	Length
1.	"Go Outside!"	Alessia Cara	Cara; Mike Elizondo; Josiah Sherman	Elizondo; Buddy Ross^{[c]}	3:39
2.	"Left Alone"	Cara	Cara; Greg Kurstin	Kurstin	2:45
3.	"Dead Man"	Cara	Cara; Elizondo	Elizondo	3:23
4.	"Subside"	Cara	Cara; Elizondo	Elizondo	4:28
5.	"Run Run"	Cara	Cara; Jon Levine	Dan Farber; Levine	2:53
6.	"Drive"	Cara	Cara; Jeremy Malvin	Elizondo; Chrome Sparks^{[c]}	2:50
7.	"Get to You"	Cara	Cara; Levine	Cara; Levine	3:07
8.	"(Isn't It) Obvious"	Cara; Dave Lubben; Toby McKeehan; Holly Miller	Cara; Lubben; McKeehan; Miller; Jakob Rabitsch	Yakob	3:51
9.	"Garden Interlude"	Cara	Cara; Jack Rochon	Rochon	2:26
10.	"Nighttime Thing"	Cara; Joshua Coleman; Jacob Kasher Hindlin	Cara; Coleman; Jasper Harris; Hindlin; David Sprecher; Aaron Shadrow	Ammo; Elizondo; Yeti Beats; Shadrow^{[c]}; Harris^{[c]}	2:24
11.	"Feels Right"	Cara	Cara; Matt Campfield; Danny Klein; Rabitsch	Some Randoms; Yakob	3:07
12.	"Fire"	Cara; Jake Torrey	Cara; Levine; Torrey	Levine; Elizondo	3:45
13.	"Slow Motion"	Cara	Cara; Matt Brettle; Elizondo; Jake Gosling	Elizondo; Gosling^{[c]}	3:23
14.	"Clearly"	Cara	Cara; Farber; Levine	Farber; Levine	3:28
Total length:					45:36

Deluxe edition tracks
No.	Title	Lyrics	Music	Producer(s)	Length
15.	"Easy"	Cara; Christian Kuria; Jack Dine	Cara; Kuria; Dine	Kuria; Dine	2:52
16.	"Sunday"	Cara	Cara	Elizondo	2:48
17.	"Clean"	Cara; Jeff Baranowski; Jeremy Reeves; Jonathan Yip; Luke Milano; Ray Romulus	Cara; Baranowski; Reeves; Yip; Milano; Romulus	The Stereotypes; 9am	3:12
18.	"Nighttime Thing" (featuring Julia Michaels)	Cara; Hindlin; Coleman; Michaels	Cara; Shadrow; Sprecher; Hindlin; Harris; Coleman; Michaels	Ammo; Elizondo; Yeti Beats; Shadrow^{[c]}; Harris^{[c]}	2:24
19.	"(Isn't It) Obvious" (featuring Lucky Daye)	Cara; Lubben; David Brown; Miller; McKeehan	Cara; Lubben; Brown; Miller; Jakob Rabitsch; McKeehan	Yakob	3:41
20.	"Fire" (featuring Tiny Habits)	Cara; Cinya Khan; Maya Rae; Judah Mayowa; Torrey	Cara; Khan; Rae; Mayowa; Torrey; Levine	Elizonzo; Levine	3:45
21.	"Dead Man" (acoustic version)	Cara	Cara; Elizondo	Sam Arion	3:27
22.	"(Isn't It) Obvious" (acoustic version)	Cara; Lubben; Miller; McKeehan	Cara; Lubben; Miller; McKeehan; Rabitsch	Arion	2:38

Notes

- ^{^[c]} signifies a co-producer.

== Personnel ==
=== Musicians ===
- Alessia Cara – lead vocals (all tracks), background vocals (tracks 1, 3–8, 13), bass (7)
- Mike Elizondo – bass, keyboards (tracks 1, 3, 4, 6, 10, 12); percussion (1, 6, 10), programming (3, 12), electric guitar (4, 10), drum programming (4, 12); acoustic guitar, string arrangement (10); background vocals (13)
- Trevor Lawrence Jr. – drums, percussion (tracks 1, 3, 4, 6, 12, 13)
- Max Townsley – keyboards (1, 3, 6, 10), Wurlitzer electric piano (1), electric guitar (3, 6, 10, 12, 13), piano (3, 12), organ (3), acoustic guitar (4, 6, 12), Rhodes (4, 13), drums (10)
- Buddy Ross – keyboards, programming (track 1)
- Greg Kurstin – bass, drums, electric guitar, keyboards, Rhodes, synthesizer (track 2)
- Evan Cobb – saxophone (track 3)
- Roy Agee – trombone (track 3)
- Emmanuel Echem – trumpet (track 3)
- Austin Hoke – cello (tracks 4, 10)
- Betsy Lamb – viola (tracks 4, 10)
- Alicia Enstrom – violin (tracks 4, 10)
- Kristin Weber – violin (tracks 4, 10)
- Jordan Lehning – string arrangement (track 4)
- Dan Farber – guitar (tracks 5, 7, 14); drums, programming (5, 14); background vocals, drum programming (5); percussion (14)
- Jules Halpern – background vocals (track 5)
- Olivia Aita – background vocals (track 5)
- Vincent Garcia – bass (track 5)
- Jon Levine – drums, keyboards (tracks 5, 7, 14); programming, Rhodes, Wurlitzer electric piano (5, 14); drum programming (5), percussion (14)
- Nick Perri – guitar (track 7)
- Yakob – bass, guitar, keyboards, programming (tracks 8, 11), drum programming (8), percussion (11)
- John Mayer – guitar (track 8)
- Jack Rochon – guitar, keyboards, programming (track 9)
- Aaron Shadrow – bass, keyboards, percussion (track 10)
- Matt Campfield – bass, guitar, keyboards (track 11)
- Danny Klein – drum programming, percussion (track 11)
- Some Randoms – programming (track 11)
- Alex Wilder – background vocals (track 13)
- Erica Block – background vocals (track 13)
- Victoria Westfall – background vocals (track 13)
- Yuli – string arrangement, strings (track 13)

=== Technical ===
- Chris Gehringer – mastering
- Tom Elmhirst – mixing
- Buddy Ross – engineering, recording (track 1)
- Mike Elizondo – engineering (tracks 3, 12)
- Jon Levine – engineering (tracks 5, 14), recording (5, 7, 14)
- Dan Farber – engineering (tracks 5, 14), recording (5, 14)
- Yakob – engineering (track 8)
- Jack Rochon – engineering, recording (track 9)
- Alex Wilder – recording, second engineering (tracks 1, 3, 4, 6, 10, 12, 13); additional engineering (1, 4, 10, 13)
- Erica Block – recording, second engineering (tracks 1, 3, 4, 6, 10, 12, 13)
- Justin Francis – recording (tracks 1, 3, 4, 6, 10, 12, 13)
- Greg Kurstin – recording (track 2)
- Julian Burg – recording (track 2)
- Matt Tuggle – recording (track 2)
- Jakob Rabitsch – recording (tracks 8, 11)

== Charts ==
Chart performance for Love & Hyperbole
Chart (2025)	Peak position
US Top Album Sales (Billboard)	41
