= Harmony (Serena Ryder album) =

2012 album by Serena Ryder

Studio album by Serena Ryder
- Released: November 27, 2012
- Genre: Indie rock, blues rock, folk rock
- Length: 35:32
- Label: EMI, Serenader Source
- Producer: Jerrod Bettis, Jon Levine

Serena Ryder chronology
Is It O.K. (2008)	Harmony (2012)	Utopia (2017)

Singles from Harmony
- 1. "Stompa" Released: September 27, 2012; 2. "What I Wouldn't Do" Released: November 6, 2012; 3. "Fall" Released: November 27, 2013; 4. "Heavy Love" Released: 2014

Professional ratings
Review scores
Source	Rating
AllMusic	3.5/5 stars

Harmony is the sixth studio album by Canadian singer-songwriter Serena Ryder. The album was released on November 27, 2012 in Canada, and on August 27, 2013 in the USA. A French edition featuring bilingual versions of two songs was released for the Quebec market on September 24, 2013. It received three Juno Award Nominations in 2013, winning Adult Alternative Album with five more (pending) nominations the following year including Album of the Year. The album was co-written and produced by Jarrod Bettis and Jon Levine and mixed by Joe Zook.

== Commercial performance ==
The album was certified gold by Music Canada on February 7, 2013, shipping 40,000 copies. The album attained platinum certification in July 2013.

In 2013, the album sold 74,000 copies in Canada.

== Singles ==
The lead single, titled "Stompa", was released on September 27, 2012, in Canada, and then on February 26, 2013 to the US The song peaked at No. 8 on the Canadian Hot 100, after spending 16 weeks on the chart. The second Canadian single, titled "What I Wouldn't Do", was released in early November 2012, and has reached No. 8 on the Canadian Hot 100. The song "For You" "reinterprets" Screamin' Jay Hawkins' well-known "I Put a Spell on You" and shares a songwriting credit with his estate.

== Track listing ==
Standard edition
No.	Title	Writer(s)	Length
1.	"What I Wouldn't Do"	Ryder; Jerrod Bettis	3:40
2.	"Fall"	Ryder; Jon Levine	3:30
3.	"Call Me"	Ryder; Meghan Kabir	3:35
4.	"Baby Come Back"	Ryder; Bettis	4:47
5.	"Please Baby Please"	Ryder; Dan Burns; Aidan Hawken	4:37
6.	"For You"	Ryder; Levine; Screamin' Jay Hawkins	4:04
7.	"Heavy Love"	Ryder; Bettis	3:19
8.	"Stompa"	Ryder; Bettis	3:41
9.	"Mary Go Round"	Ryder; Jeff Coplan	3:28
10.	"Nobody But You"	Ryder	0:51

iTunes Store bonus tracks
No.	Title	Writer(s)	Length
11.	"Circle of the Sun"	Ryder; Levine; Derek Downham	3:16
12.	"Hey There"	Ryder; Maïa Davies	3:06
13.	"Fated To Love" (Pre-order only)	Ryder; Todor Kobakov	3:27

French edition
No.	Title	Writer(s)	Length
1.	"What I Wouldn't Do" (Version française)	Ryder; Jerrod Bettis; Liane De Lotbinière; Maïa Davies	3:41
2.	"Fall"	Ryder; Jon Levine	3:30
3.	"Call Me"	Ryder; Meghan Kabir	3:35
4.	"Baby Come Back"	Ryder; Bettis	4:47
5.	"Please Baby Please"	Ryder; Dan Burns; Aidan Hawken	4:37
6.	"For You"	Ryder; Levine; Screamin' Jay Hawkins	4:04
7.	"Heavy Love"	Ryder; Bettis	3:19
8.	"Stompa" (Version française)	Ryder; Bettis; Liane De Lotbinière	3:11
9.	"Mary Go Round"	Ryder; Jeff Coplan	3:28
10.	"Nobody But You"	Ryder	0:51
11.	"Circle of the Sun"	Ryder; Levine; Derek Downham	3:16
12.	"Hey There"	Ryder; Davies	3:06
13.	"Stompa (version anglaise)"	Ryder; Bettis	3:41
14.	"What I Wouldn't Do (version anglaise)"	Ryder; Jerrod Bettis	3:40

U.S. edition
No.	Title	Writer(s)	Length
1.	"What I Wouldn't Do"	Ryder; Jerrod Bettis	3:40
2.	"Stompa"	Ryder; Bettis	3:41
3.	"Mary Go Round"	Ryder; Jeff Coplan	3:28
4.	"Baby Come Back"	Ryder; Bettis	4:47
5.	"Fall"	Ryder; Jon Levine	3:30
6.	"Call Me"	Ryder; Meghan Kabir	3:35
7.	"Heavy Love"	Ryder; Bettis	3:19
8.	"Please Baby Please"	Ryder; Dan Burns; Aidan Hawken	4:37
9.	"For You"	Ryder; Levine; Screamin' Jay Hawkins	4:04
10.	"Nobody But You"	Ryder	0:51
11.	"Stompa" (Radio Edit)	Ryder; Bettis	3:04

U.S. iTunes Store bonus tracks
No.	Title	Writer(s)	Length
11.	"Circle of the Sun"	Ryder; Levine; Derek Downham	3:16
12.	"Hey There"	Ryder; Maïa Davies	3:06
13.	"Fated To Love"	Ryder; Todor Kobakov	3:27
14.	"Stompa" (Radio Edit)	Ryder; Bettis	3:04

== Charts ==
=== Weekly charts ===
Chart (2012–2013)	Peak position
Canadian Albums (Billboard)	11

=== Year-end charts ===
Chart (2013)	Position
Canadian Albums (Billboard)	34
