= Emanuel (musician) =

Canadian R&B singer

Emanuel Assefa, credited as Emanuel, is a Canadian R&B singer, whose debut EP Alt Therapy Session 1: Disillusion was a Juno Award nominee for Traditional R&B/Soul Recording of the Year at the Juno Awards of 2021.

Assefa was born and raised in London, Ontario, the son of parents from Ethiopia who came to Canada as refugees in the 1970s.

His first single, "Need You", was released in April 2020, and was promoted in part with a music video compiled from the responses to actor Idris Elba's social media request for pictorial and video collages of the things that were helping people to cope with the COVID-19 pandemic.

Alt Therapy Session 1: Disillusion was released in June 2020, and was followed by Alt Therapy Session 2: Transformation in December His full-length debut album Alt Therapy, including songs from both of the prior EPs, was released in 2021 on Motown Records, and was a Juno Award nominee for Traditional R&B/Soul Recording at the Juno Awards of 2022.

His song "Black Woman", cowritten with Ryan Bakalarczyk, John Fellner and Kardinal Offishall, was a nominee for the 2021 SOCAN Songwriting Prize.
