= Wake Owl =

Canadian indie pop band

- Origin: Vancouver, British Columbia, Canada
- Genres: folk rock, indie pop
- Years active: 2012–present
- Labels: Vagrant Records; Rezolute Music
- Members: Colyn Cameron; Aiden Brant-Briscall

Wake Owl is an indie pop band based in Vancouver, British Columbia and Portland, Oregon. The band's core members are singer and songwriter Colyn Cameron and multi-instrumentalist Aiden Brant-Briscall.

== History ==
Following several years of international travel during which Cameron wrote songs primarily as a hobby, the band released its debut EP as a free internet download in 2012, and was rereleased January 29, 2013 on Vagrant Records. The band toured both Canada and the United States to support the EP.

The EP garnered airplay on CBC Radio 2, with the title track reaching #1 on the Radio 2 Top 20 in June 2013, and the track "Gold" was featured in an episode of Grey's Anatomy.

The band garnered a Juno Award nomination for Breakthrough Artist of the Year at the Juno Awards of 2014. Following this nomination, the band toured several cities in Canada and were featured on the CBC Radio show q for an interview and live performance of a few songs from their forthcoming album.

The band's debut full-length album The Private World of Paradise was released March 4, 2014 on Rezolute Music. The album is described as more experimental and pop-oriented than Wild Country, with an increased emphasis on rhythm and synth-pop textures.

Their second full-length album, Kaleidoscopes, was released July 20, 2017, preceded by the singles "Tricks" and "To Be Used". It can also be found on YouTube.

== Discography ==
- Wild Country (2012)
- The Private World of Paradise (2014)
- Kaleidoscopes (2017)
