= Juno Award for Traditional R&B/Soul Recording of the Year =

Canadian music award

The Juno Award for Traditional R&B/Soul Recording of the Year is an annual Canadian music award, presented as part of the Juno Awards to honour the year's best Canadian recordings in traditional rhythm and blues and soul music. The award was presented for the first time at the Juno Awards of 2021, after the splitting of the former R&B/Soul Recording of the Year into new categories for contemporary and traditional music.

== Winners and nominees ==
Year	Winner(s)	Recording	Nominees	Ref.
2021	Savannah Ré	Solid	Emanuel, Alt Therapy Session 1: Disillusion; Iamtheliving, In This Thing Called Life; Dylan Sinclair, Proverb; Charlotte Day Wilson, "Take Care of You"	
2022	Savannah Ré	24hrs	Charlotte Day Wilson, Alpha; Emanuel, Alt Therapy; Jon Vinyl, Lost in You; Zenesoul feat. Aaron Ridge, "Love and Be Loved"	
2023	Savannah Ré feat. Dylan Sinclair	"Last One"	Daniel Caesar feat. BadBadNotGood, "Please Do Not Lean"; Jon Vinyl, Palisade; Safe, "All I Need"; TheHonestGuy, How to Make Love	
2024	Aqyila	"Hello"	Jhyve, "Unbreakable"; Luna Elle, "9 to 5"; Katie Tupper, Where to Find Me; RealestK, Real World	
2025	TheHonestGuy	Velvet Soul	Aqyila, Limbo; Benita, The Worst; Luna Elle, Halfway Broken; Charlotte Day Wilson, Cyan Blue	
2026	Melanie Fiona	"Say Yes"	Daniel Caesar, "Have a Baby (With Me)"; Tanika Charles, "Reasons to Stay"; Jessie Reyez, "Goliath"; Savannah Ré, "Formed"	
