= Savannah Ré =

Canadian R&B singer-songwriter

- Born: Scarborough, Ontario
- Genre: R&B
- Occupation: Singer
- Spouse: Yogi (m. 2019)

Savannah Ré Simpson, simply known as Savannah Ré, is a Canadian R&B singer-songwriter from Scarborough, Ontario, whose debut EP Opia was released in 2020.

== Early life ==
A graduate of St. John Paul II Catholic Secondary School in Scarborough, Ré began performing in Toronto after being pushed to get onstage by the organizer of an open mic show at the city's Lambadina lounge. She subsequently drew the attention of musician and producer Babyface, who invited her to participate in two emerging artist competitions, and Jessie Reyez, for whom she performed as an opening act for several dates on the tour to support Being Human in Public, before signing to Boi-1da's 1Music label.

== Career ==
At the Juno Awards of 2021, Ré won the Traditional R&B/Soul Recording of the Year for her song "Solid", and was nominated for Contemporary R&B/Soul Recording of the Year for her song "Where You Are. Her album Opia was subsequently longlisted for the 2021 Polaris Music Prize. Her video for "Solid", directed by Alicia K. Harris, was a nominee for the 2021 Prism Prize.

"Solid" was a nominee for the 2021 SOCAN Songwriting Prize.

In 2023, she was the grand prize recipient of the SOCAN Foundation's Her Music Awards along with Kellylee Evans.

Ré performed "O Canada" at the 108th Grey Cup.

Her first EP No Weapons was released in 2022, featuring guest appearances from Dylan Sinclair and Mez.

== Personal life ==
She is married to Grammy award winner Saint Lucian-born Johann ‘Yogi the Producer’ Deterville. He won the Grammy as part of the production team on Chris Brown’s 11:11 album.

== Discography ==
=== Albums ===
- Formed (2025)
- Opia (2020)

=== EPs ===
- Something/Someone New (2024)
- No Weapons (2022)
