= Jordan Raycroft =

Canadian singer-songwriter

- Born: Jordan Raycroft
- Genres: Folk, singer-songwriter
- Years active: 2010–2016
- Website: raycroftmusic.com

Jordan Raycroft is a Canadian singer-songwriter. His debut solo album, titled Jordan Raycroft (2013), was nominated for a Juno Award in 2014.

== Discography ==
=== Solo ===
- Jordan Raycroft (2013)

=== Raycroft ===
- Ero Cras (2014)
- Dream House Sessions (2015)
- Woman of My Dreams (2016)
