= Tobi (musician) =

Nigerian-Canadian rapper

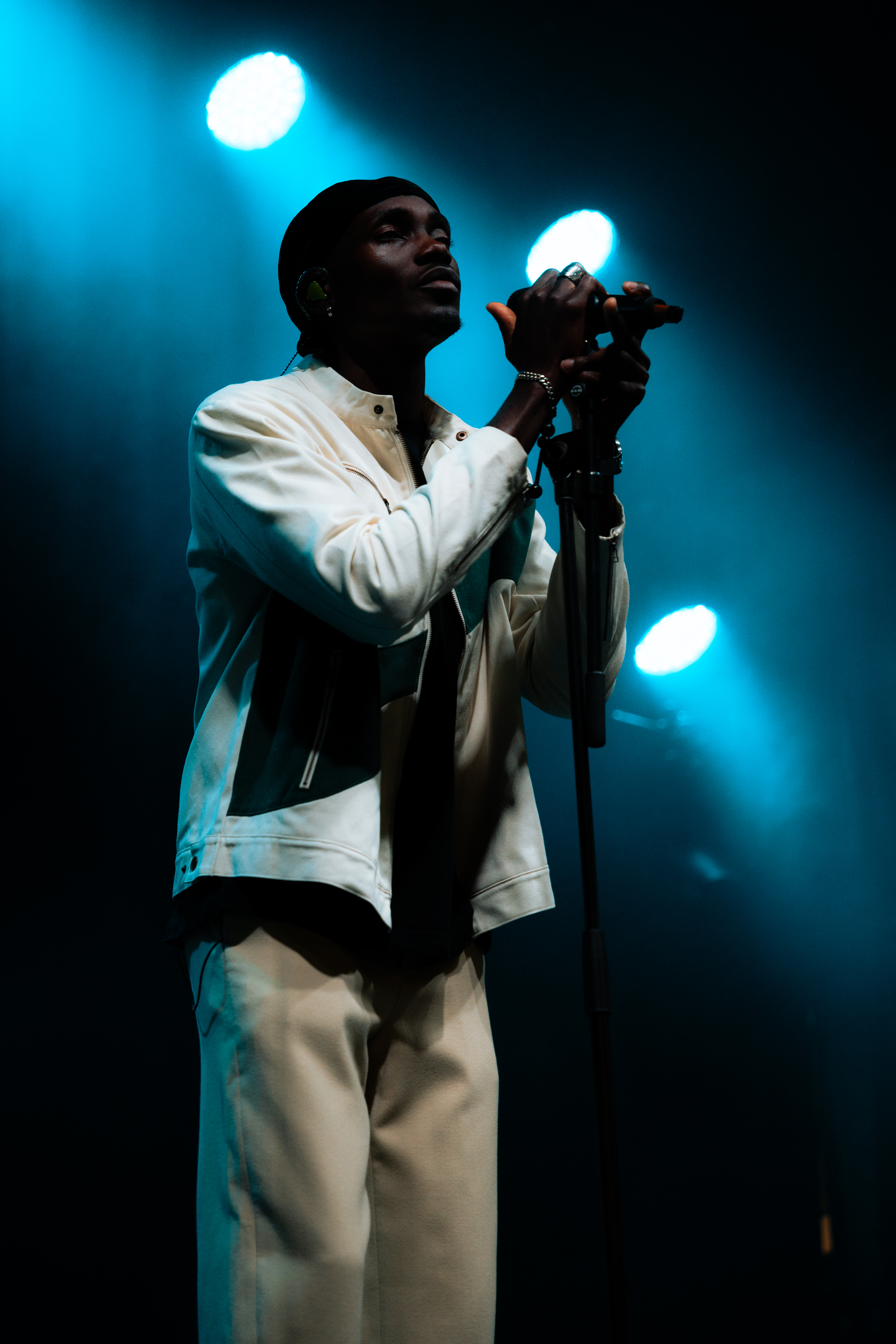
- TOBi performing at Hamilton's Supercrawl event in 2025

Background information
- Also known as: Tobi Aji
- Born: Oluwatobi Feyisara Ajibolade; 1993 (age 32–33); Lagos, Nigeria
- Origin: Brampton, Ontario, Canada
- Genres: R&B; hip hop; soul
- Occupations: Singer; rapper; songwriter
- Years active: 2015–present
- Labels: RCA; Same Plate
- Website: tobi.world

Oluwatobi Feyisara Ajibolade, known professionally as Tobi (stylized as TOBi), is a Nigerian-born Canadian singer and rapper signed to RCA Records and Same Plate Entertainment. He released his debut studio album Still in May 2019, his second album Elements Vol. 1 in 2020, his third album PANIC in 2023 and his fourth album Elements Vol.2 in 2025.

== Early life and education ==
Oluwatobi Feyisara Ajibolade was born in 1993 in Lagos, Nigeria and moved to Ottawa, Canada with his father when he was 9 years old. He first began writing lyrics and poetry around that time. Ajibolade grew up largely in Brampton, Ontario.

In an interview with DARBY, Ajibolade recalled playing association football barefoot on the streets of Lagos as a child, using improvised goalposts and continuing play even after the ball landed in a roadside gutter, describing the experience as pure and unstructured. He has said that watching football with his father, uncles and cousins in Nigeria, particularly English Premier League matches involving Arsenal, fostered a strong sense of communal identity within his family, and he has cited Nigerian international Jay-Jay Okocha as a formative figure whose flair and self-assurance on the pitch left a lasting impression on him during that period. Tobi has said his most competitive period playing football himself came around age 12, when he was named the most valuable player of his elementary school's team, before he shifted his focus toward his education and music. He has stated that after relocating to Canada, feelings of social isolation stemming from cultural and linguistic differences contributed to his early pull toward writing and recording music.

As a teenager, he engaged in rap battles, including one with a pre-fame Tory Lanez. He later attended Wilfrid Laurier University where he studied biology and psychology.

== Career ==
Around 2015, Ajibolade began releasing music using the stage name, "Tobi Aji". In 2016, he began using the moniker, "Tobi" (stylized as TOBi), and independently released an EP titled, FYI. The collection featured the songs, "Indecisions" and "Deeper". A music video for the latter song was released in November 2016. The following month, Tobi released the single, "Libra".

In September 2017, he released the song, "Hidden Fences", which appeared on an episode of the HBO series, Insecure. Another song, "January December", was released in January 2018. Beginning in 2019, Tobi began releasing several new tracks, including "City Blues", "Sweet Poison", and "Werking". Those three songs served as the singles for Tobi's debut studio album, Still, released in May 2019 by RCA Records and Same Plate Entertainment. The album also featured a guest appearance from VanJess on the track, "Come Back Home". A deluxe edition of the album, Still+, was released in April 2020 and included two new songs ("Paid" and "Holiday") and three new remixes. Still+ had guest appearances from The Game, Shad, Haviah Mighty, Kemba, Jazz Cartier, and Ejji Smith.

In October 2020, Tobi released his second studio album, Elements Vol. 1. It won the 2021 Juno Award for Rap Recording of the Year, with "Holiday" being nominated for Contemporary R&B/Soul Recording of the Year. The music video for his song "24 (Toronto Remix)", directed by Kit Weyman, was longlisted for the 2021 Prism Prize.

In January 2021, he was named one of the winners of SOCAN's inaugural Black Canadian Music Awards alongside Dylan Sinclair, Naya Ali, RAAHiiM and Hunnah.

Elements Vol. 1 was shortlisted for the 2021 Polaris Music Prize.

In 2023, he participated in an all-star recording of Serena Ryder's single "What I Wouldn't Do", which was released as a charity single to benefit Kids Help Phone's Feel Out Loud campaign for youth mental health.

At the Juno Awards of 2024, he won both Rap Album of the Year for Panic, and Rap Single of the Year for "Someone I Knew". Panic was a shortlisted finalist for the 2024 Polaris Music Prize.

For Good Measure (at Dreamhouse Studios) was longlisted for the 2026 Polaris Music Prize.

== Artistry ==
In an interview with Afropunk, Tobi cited the work of Gil Scott-Heron, Frank Ocean, Marvin Gaye, Eartha Kitt, Florence and the Machine, and Andre 3000 as inspirations for his own work, particularly his lyrics. Speaking to DARBY, Tobi likened his creative approach to that of a centre attacking midfielder in football, describing his role within a song as shifting fluidly between driving a track forward and supporting it, comparing his outlook to viewing "the entire pitch" rather than a single fixed position. He also described his onstage mentality as comparable to that of a competing athlete, saying his focus while performing is directed toward the substance of the performance itself rather than audience reaction or acclaim.

== Personal life ==
Tobi has described himself as a supporter of Manchester City, saying his affinity for the club developed during his university years through playing the FIFA video game series and following players including David Silva, Sergio Agüero and James Milner. He has named Zlatan Ibrahimović as a footballer whose confidence he has drawn on for inspiration in his own creative work, and has also cited Pelé, Didier Drogba and Cristiano Ronaldo among the footballers who have most influenced him, alongside rapper Kendrick Lamar as his most influential musician.

== Discography ==
=== Studio albums ===
List of studio albums, with year released and selected details
Title	Album details
Still	Released: May 3, 2019; Label: RCA, Same Plate; Format: Digital download
Elements Vol. 1	Released: October 21, 2020; Label: RCA, Same Plate; Format: Digital download
PANIC	Released: October 12, 2023; Label: RCA, Same Plate; Format: Digital download

=== Extended plays ===
List of extended plays, with year released and selected details
Title	Album details
FYI	Released: July 14, 2016; Label: Self-released; Format: Digital download

=== Singles ===
List of singles with selected details
Title	Year	Album
"Deeper"	2016	FYI
"Indecisions"	2016	FYI
"Hidden Fences"	2017	Non-album single
"City Blues"	2019	Still
"Sweet Poison"	2019	Still
"Werking"	2019	Still
"Woah" (with Jazz Cartier)	2021	TBA
