= Tiny Habits =

American folk-pop trio

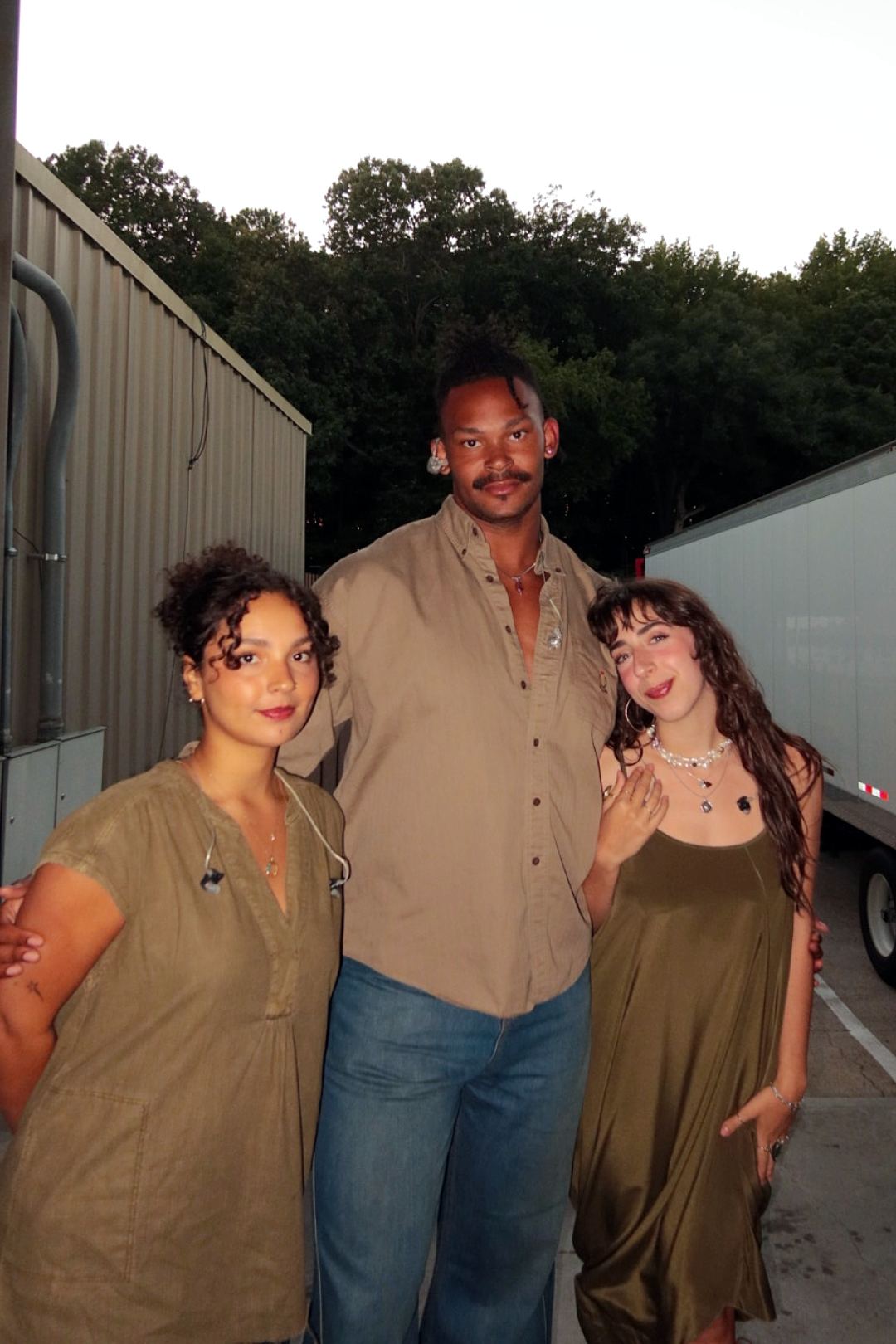

Background information
- Origin: Boston, Massachusetts, U.S.
- Genre: Folk-pop
- Years active: 2022 – present
- Label: Mom + Pop Music
- Members: Cinya Khan; Maya Rae; Judah Mayowa
- Website: tinyhabitsofficial.com

Tiny Habits is an American folk-pop music group formed in Boston in 2022. The trio consists of Berklee College of Music alumni Cinya Khan, Maya Rae, and Judah Mayowa. Their first EP, Tiny Things, was released in April 2023. Their debut studio album All For Something was released in May 2024. Their second album Keepers came out in August 2026.

== History ==
Khan, Rae, and Mayowa met as students at the Berklee College of Music in Boston in the spring of 2021, during the COVID-19 pandemic. They happened to live in the same dorm and would sing covers of old songs in each other's rooms, later posting videos to social media. After multiple videos went viral on TikTok and Instagram, the three decided to officially form a group in January 2022.

Tiny Habits has attracted praise for their harmonies, including notable mentions by Elton John and David Crosby, and have been hailed as "The Prodigies of Harmonies" in a New Yorker magazine article on the band. The group has toured alongside multiple folk and indie artists. They opened for Ingrid Michaelson's 2022 Christmas tour, and for Gracie Abrams during the sold-out North American leg of her spring 2023 tour. In November 2022, the group sang back-up vocals for Lizzy McAlpine on her Tiny Desk concert performance, a video which has almost 4 million views as of April 2025.

Their song "Embers" was featured in the soundtrack for the 2023 Netflix film Your Place or Mine.

On April 12, 2023, the trio released their first EP, Tiny Things.

Tiny Habits headlined their first tour in June 2023, and opened for Noah Kahan during the European and United Kingdom legs of his 2023 "Stick Season Tour." The group headlined a second tour, "Little Bit Farther," in North America and Europe to during the spring of 2024. The tour's opening acts were Beane in North America and Shallow Alcove in Europe and the United Kingdom. In January 2024, the band rejoined Gracie Abrams to open for the Australian leg of her "Good Riddance Tour." In the fall of 2024, Tiny Habits opened for Vance Joy on the North American leg of his "Dream Your Life Away" anniversary tour, followed by a tour opening for Lake Street Dive. The band's sold-out Australian headline tour followed at the end of 2024.

Their debut album, All For Something, was released May 24, 2024.

In summer 2025, Tiny Habits opened for James Taylor on a 43-date tour that included Phoenix, San Diego, Santa Barbara, Milwaukee, Cincinnati, Toronto, and Gilford, New Hampshire. In fall 2025, they opened for Sarah McLachlan on the Canadian leg of her Fumbling Towards Ecstasy 30th Anniversary Tour.

The band played at Noah Kahan's "Out of the Blue" festival in January, 2026.

On June 22, 2026, Tiny Habits announced their Keepers Tour with 24 North American dates in November and December 2026, joined by opener Marie Dresselhuis. The band's second studio album, Keepers, was released on August 28, 2026. On the album's release date, a Rolling Stone profile of Tiny Habits described the record as "a sumptuous departure from their debut, filled with the complicated stories of love, yes, but also love’s more prickly siblings: desire, guilt, self-doubt, delusion, anger, freedom, and bittersweet joy." Rae told the magazine the band wanted to create an album that was relatable to fans, writing more about personal experiences than romance.

== Discography ==
=== Studio albums ===
Title	Details
All for Something	Released: May 24, 2024; Label: Mom + Pop Music; Formats: Streaming, digital download
Keepers	Released: August 28, 2026; Label: Mom + Pop Music; Formats: Streaming, digital download, LP, CD

=== Extended plays ===
Title	Details
Tiny Things	Released: April 12, 2023; Label: Harbour Artists & Music; Formats: Streaming, digital download

=== Singles ===
Title	Details
"For Sale Sign" (feat. Lizzy McAlpine)	Released: November 21, 2024; Label: Mom + Pop Music
"Either"	Released: July 18, 2025; Label: Mom + Pop Music
"Leaving on a Jet Plane" with Lake Street Dive	Released: November 19, 2025; Label: Independent release
"Anything He Was" with Matty Healy	Released: June 17, 2026; Label: Mom + Pop Music

=== Singles as featured artist ===
Title	Details
"Everything Ends (feat. Lizzy McAlpine and Tiny Habits)" (JP Saxe featuring Lizzy McAlpine and Tiny Habits)	Released: September 22, 2023; Label: Arista Records
"Antichrist" (Holly Humberstone featuring Tiny Habits)	Released: May 3, 2024; Label: Polydor Records
"Perfection (feat. Tiny Habits)" (Kacey Musgraves featuring Tiny Habits)	Released: August 2, 2024; Label: Interscope Records
"Hey Beautiful (with Louane & Tiny Habits)" (Joe Jonas featuring Louane & Tiny Habits)	Released: May 23, 2025; Label: Republic Records
