= Aidan Hawken =

American singer-songwriter (born 1975)

Aidan Hawken (born November 5, 1975) is an American singer-songwriter and musician from San Francisco.

== Life and career ==
Aidan Alexander Hawken was born in San Anselmo, California to Anna and Paul Hawken, environmentalist, entrepreneur and author of such books as The Ecology of Commerce. In 1995, Hawken, joined by guitarist JJ Wiesler and keyboardist Jason Borger, formed Highwater Rising. Their records, Highwater Rising and The In Between were produced by record producers Jacquire King and Eric Valentine, respectively. Popular radio DJ and host of Los Angeles' KCRW show New Ground, Chris Douridas named The In Between as one of the best records of 2002. Songs from The In Between were featured on MTV's The Real World and Laguna Beach, Fox's Boston Public, HBO's Sex and the City and also One Tree Hill. 9 out of 10 of the songs on this album have been licensed, making it one of the most licensed independent albums of all time.

In the spring of 2005, Hawkins relocated to Los Angeles and released his first solo record, Pillows and Records, featuring fellow musicians Chuck Prophet, Jim Bogios of Counting Crows, Tom Ayers of Persephone's Bees, Brett Simon of Fiona Apple and Highwater Rising's Jason Borger and JJ Wiesler. The following year, Pillow and Records was named Best of iTunes Independent Music. From that album, he made his television debut, playing himself while performing "Somebody Else" on ABC's show Wildfire.

With producer, Jacob Bronstein, Hawken later formed Mega Bass. And in 2007, Mega Bass's "Blind" was featured as the intro song to CW's Hidden Palms. That same year, Hawken joined the ranks of popular artists and bands such as Elvis Costello, Death Cab for Cutie, Ozomatli and Regina Spektor and covered "Little Boxes" by Malvina Reynolds for the second season of the popular Showtime TV series Weeds.

The following year, Aidan Hawken returned to San Francisco and released his second solo work, The Sleep of Trees. Originally written for the 2007 romantic comedy Good Luck Chuck, the song "Shut Me Out" is also featured on The Sleep of Trees and was short-listed for an Oscar nomination for Best Original Song. In Los Angeles, he met musician and producer, Pete Min, and guitarist and composer Eric Schermerhorn. Together, Hawken, Min and Schermerhorn formed the indie-rock group The Quiet Kind, and released their first self-titled EP in 2010. In May 2011, The Quiet Kind was featured as the Artist of the Week on ABC Television's music lounge and their track, "In Front of You", was the closing song for the Grey's Anatomy seventh season finale. Later that year, Hawken's song "The Great Escape" from the album The Sleep of Trees was featured a commercial for American Public University, and SandRidge Energy.

In October 2010, Aidan Hawken released an EP entitled Temporary Heart.

Aidan Hawken later collaborated with close friend, Grammy Nominated Record Producer Engineer, Dan Burns as well as Canadian artist Serena Ryder to write "Please Baby Please" to be included in Ryder's record entitled Harmony. In 2012, Ryder's record won the Juno for Adult Alternative Album of the Year, earning Hawken a Juno as well.

Hawken's song "Walking Blind", from his 2013 EP of the same name, was featured in the TNT series Major Crimes in the episode "The Deep End" (season 2, episode 8).

In a recent interview, long time collaborator and friend Chuck Prophet announced that he and Aidan are getting ready to unleash their long-in-the-works project The Palace Steps in the Fall of 2013.

== Original songs for films ==
- Good Luck Chuck (Mark Helfrich, Lionsgate Films)
- American Pie Presents: The Book of Love (Universal Studios)
- I Hate Valentine's Day (Nia Vardalos, Blue Star Pictures and My Bench Productions)
- Beethoven's Big Break (Mike Elliott, Universal Studios)
- Thomas Kinkade's Home for Christmas (Michael Campus, Birch Grove Films and Radiant Productions)
- Happily N'Ever After (Paul Bolger and Yvette Kaplan, Vanguard Films)
