= What I Wouldn't Do =

Single by Serena Ryder

from the album Harmony
- Released: November 6, 2012 (Canada)
- Recorded: 2012
- Genre: Pop, Indie
- Length: 3:40
- Label: EMI
- Songwriter(s): Serena Ryder; Jerrod Bettis

Serena Ryder singles chronology
"Stompa" (2012)	"What I Wouldn't Do" (2012)	"Mary Go Round" (2013)

"What I Wouldn't Do" is a song performed by Canadian singer-songwriter Serena Ryder, which was released as a single in November 2012. The song was written by Ryder and Jerrod Bettis for Ryder's fifth studio album, Harmony. The song was released as the second single from the album in Canada. The song was featured in a 2013 episode of Grey's Anatomy and Rookie Blue, however, release of the single in the United States was delayed due to the success of Serena's previous single "Stompa".

== Lyrics and composition ==
Lyrically, the track is a love song in which Ryder claims there is nothing she wouldn't do for her lover.

== Critical reception ==
"What I Wouldn't Do" received mixed to favorable reviews, with Ben Rayner of the Toronto Star praising the track's "crossover appeal", while Aaron Swanbergson of the National Music Center claimed the "catchy pop" song was "destined for radio fame". In contrast, music blog Snob's Music called the song "a blasé mid-tempo number that fails to put any focus on Ryder's growled 'don't piss me off' vocals."

== Music video ==
The official music video for the track premiered on June 22, 2013 on MTV Canada's website, after a short preview was released the day before.

== Artists for Feel Out Loud ==
In 2023, the song was covered as a supergroup charity single, to benefit Kids Help Phone's Feel Out Loud campaign for youth mental health. The cover also interpolated parts of Leela Gilday's song "North Star Calling", as well as featuring some lines translated into French.

In addition to both Ryder and Gilday, other artists participating in the Artists for Feel Out Loud recording were Alessia Cara, Roy Woods, Johnny Orlando, Boslen, Tobi, Jade LeMac, Crash Adams, Jon Vinyl, GRAE, Gracie Ella, BLUE WILL, memyself&vi, Tafari Anthony, Sahara, Fefe Dobson, Adria Kain, Baby girl, Jully Black, LOKRE, Shawnee Kish, Stereos, Billy Raffoul, Katherine Li, Jessia, JP Saxe, MacKenzie Porter, Ryland James, Rêve, Preston Pablo, Ashley Sienna, Marie-Mai, Jonathan Roy, 2Frères, Dominique Fils-Aimé, Izzy S, Jeanick Fournier, Naya Ali, Zach Zoya, The Reklaws, Wild Rivers, LOONY, Haviah Mighty, Nicolina, Shawn Desman, Sacha, TALK, Lilyisthatyou, Sarah McLachlan, Donovan Woods, Jamie Fine and Tyler Shaw.

== Charts ==
=== Weekly charts ===
Chart (2013)	Peak position
Canada (Canadian Hot 100)	8
Canada AC (Billboard)	5
Canada CHR/Top 40 (Billboard)	8
Canada Hot AC (Billboard)	5
Canada Rock (Billboard)	19
US Adult Alternative Songs (Billboard)	24

=== Year-end charts ===
Chart (2013)	Position
Canada (Canadian Hot 100)	30
