= Adria Kain =

Canadian rhythm and blues singer

Adria Kain is a Canadian rhythm and blues singer from Toronto, Ontario. Her full-length debut album When Flowers Bloom was released in February 2022, and was longlisted for the 2022 Polaris Music Prize.

She previously released several EPs, including Reverse Psychology (2016), DE(com)pressed (2017) and Still in Love (2018). In 2023, she participated in an all-star recording of Serena Ryder's single "What I Wouldn't Do", which was released as a charity single to benefit Kids Help Phone's Feel Out Loud campaign for youth mental health.

She identifies as queer.
