= Stompa (song) =

Single by Serena Ryder

from the album Harmony
- Released: September 27, 2012
- Recorded: 2012
- Genre: Blues rock, indie rock
- Length: 3:41; 3:04 (radio edit); 3:07 (French version)
- Label: EMI, Capitol Records
- Songwriters: Serena Ryder, Jerrod Bettis

Serena Ryder singles chronology
"Broken Heart Sun" (2011)	"Stompa" (2012)	"What I Wouldn't Do" (2012)

"Stompa" is a song performed by Canadian singer/songwriter Serena Ryder. The song was written by Ryder and Jerrod Bettis for Ryder's sixth studio album, Harmony (2012). The song was released as the lead single from the album in September 2012 in Canada, and then in February 2013 in the United States. On February 15, 2013, a French version of the song was released to Canadian iTunes.

== Lyrics and composition ==
Lyrically, the song speaks about how music can be a remedy for most of life's problems — that people should "clappa" their hands and "stompa" their feet. On the track, Ryder said "it's about encouraging people to get outside of their heads and realize that everybody’s got problems and everybody's got issues and life is hard but music can really help you out".

== Critical reception ==
"Stompa" received mostly favorable reviews, with the Montreal Gazette calling the song "infectious" and "almost Broadway-ready", while the Hamilton Spectator praised the fact that the song could be played on four different radio formats (modern rock, hot adult contemporary, contemporary hit radio and adult contemporary). The Toronto Star also took note of the fact that the song had been playlisted on virtually every single commercial radio station in the Toronto market; in the same article, Astral Media executive Rob Farina described the song as "a mashup of The Black Keys and Adele." The New York Times called it "a new song of summer" for 2013.

However, writer Elio Iannacci of the now defunct The Grid gave the song a negative review, saying the song was "hard to forgive" and "easy to forget".

"Stompa" was used in a commercial for Cadillac SRX and also used in Grey's Anatomy and Suits.

== Music video ==
The official music video for the track premiered on December 21, 2012 on MuchMusic, and was uploaded to Ryder's official VEVO channel on January 23, 2013. In the video, a little girl named Violet portrays a younger Ryder shooting arrows at symbols indicating the four elements. These shots are intercut with other girls shooting arrows, as well as shots of Ryder performing the song with her guitar in a shadowy white room. On the day of its premiere, a behind-the-scenes video was uploaded on MuchMusic's website. In that video, Ryder explained that the video is based on the same idea as her album, that if you separate yourself into one element, you will not succeed; you will only succeed if you bring in all of the elements together.

== Release history ==
Region	Date
Canada	September 27, 2012
United States	February 26, 2013

== Charts ==
=== Weekly charts ===
Chart (2013)	Peak position
Canada Hot 100 (Billboard)	8
Canada AC (Billboard)	4
Canada CHR/Top 40 (Billboard)	9
Canada Hot AC (Billboard)	4
Canada Rock (Billboard)	14
US Hot Rock Songs (Billboard)	29
US Rock Airplay (Billboard)	36
US Adult Alternative Songs (Billboard)	1
US Adult Pop Airplay (Billboard)	34

=== Year-end charts ===
Chart (2013)	Position
Canadian Hot 100 (Billboard)	14
US Hot Rock Songs (Billboard)	76
US Adult Alternative Songs (Billboard)	9

== Certifications ==
Region	Certification	Certified units/sales
Canada (Music Canada)	3× Platinum	240,000^{*}
^{*} Sales figures based on certification alone.
