= Dylan Sinclair =

Canadian R&B singer-songwriter (born 2001)

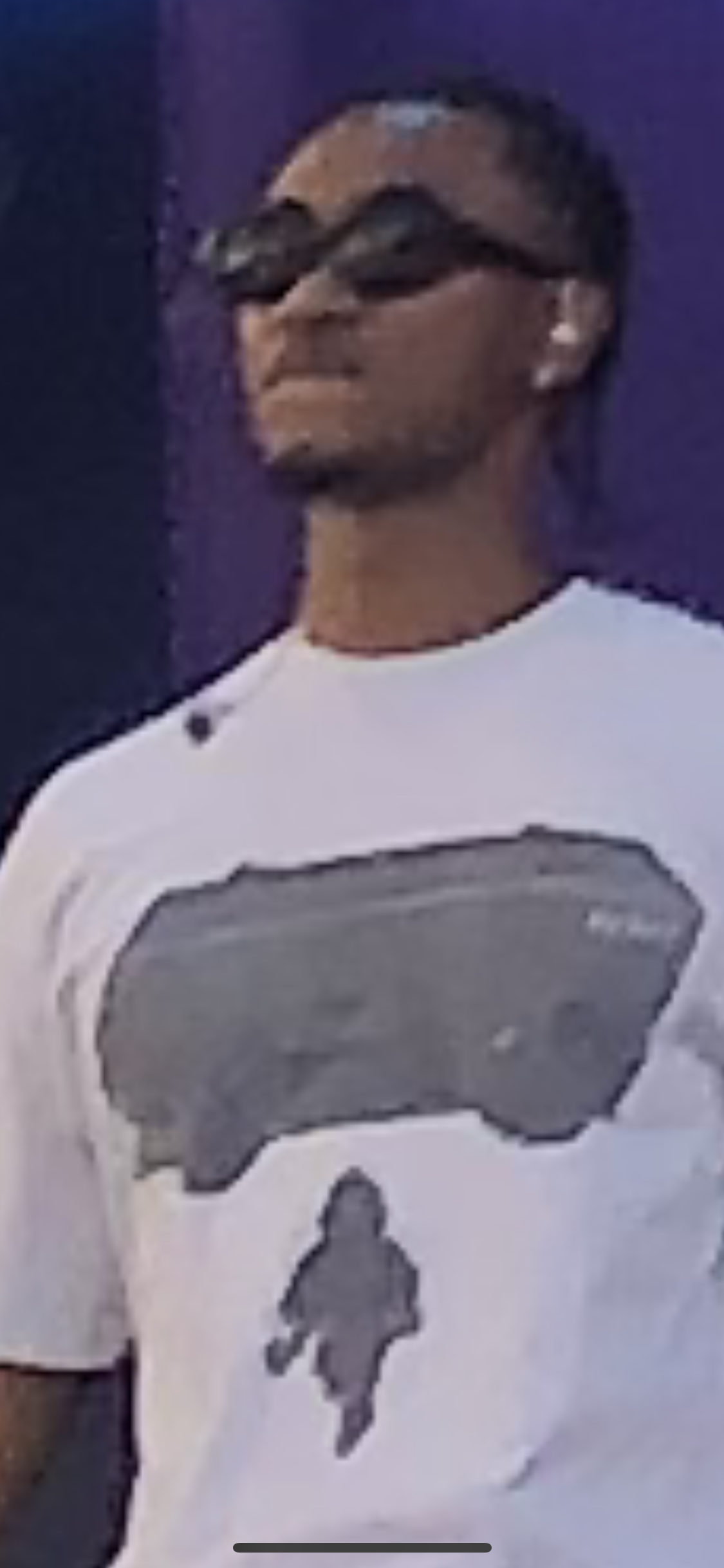
- Sinclair in 2022

Background information
- Born: June 15, 2001 (age 25); Toronto, Ontario, Canada
- Genre: R&B
- Occupations: Singer; actor; dancer
- Labels: Prodigal; Five Stones Media; Five Stone Records Inc.

Dylan Sinclair (born June 15, 2001) is a Canadian R&B singer-songwriter from Toronto, Ontario, whose full-length debut album Proverb was a Juno Award nominee for Traditional R&B/Soul Recording of the Year at the Juno Awards of 2021.

He has been a part of the record labels Prodigal, Five Stones Media and Five Stone Records Inc.

== Early life ==
Dylan Sinclair started singing in church at the age of 4. He began recording music and writing by age 15. Sinclair went to Woodland Public School in Markham, Ontario. Sinclair graduated from Thornlea Secondary School.

== Career ==
On October 6, 2017 Sinclair released his first single Twelve. On January 12, 2018 he released the single Too Fast. Sinclair released his first EP, Red Like Crimson, in 2018. On May 17, 2019 he released the single Just Anybody. On January 25, 2020 Sinclair released his first album Proverb. In January 2021, he was named one of the winners of SOCAN's inaugural Black Canadian Music Awards alongside Tobi, Naya Ali, RAAHiiM and Hunnah. On August 6, 2021 Sinclair released EP 3511, which contains the two singles Black Creek Drive and Pleasure with music videos for both within the EP as well. On November 17, 2021 Sinclair released the single Regrets. On February 25, 2022 Sinclair released Suppress. On April 13, 2022 Sinclair released the single Lifetime.

On May 11, 2022 Sinclair released his second album No Longer in the Suburbs and on November 3, 2022 released the deluxe version of the album. His 2022 album No Longer in the Suburbs was longlisted for the 2023 Polaris Music Prize.

On September 23, 2022 Dylan Sinclair was featured in fellow artist Savannah Ré's EP called No Weapons - EP in a track called Last One.

On September 28, 2022 Sinclair released the single Open (Remix) featuring DESTIN CONRAD and Jvck James. He has also been on tour with Coco Jones. On August 16, 2023 he released the single Fly Girl with both an explicit & clean version of the song on one single. On June 14, 2024 Dylan Sinclair released the single LEMON TREES. On July 24, 2024 Dylan Sinclair released single :I LO<3 MY EX.

His third album FOR THE BOY IN ME was released on September 27, 2024.

On March 7, 2025 he released EP called Motherland Sessions (Live) - EP that was live featuring a unheard track called DAHIL SA'YO.

On May 9, 2025 he released single called What I Gotta Do.

On June 13, 2025 a track called Brown Sugar was released with Dylan collaborated with artist Leon Thomas III.

On July 11, 2025 he released single called Stay Home. On October 2, 2025 he released single He's Not Me. On January 30, 2026 he released single Squeeze. On June 19, 2026 he released single called Rich Luv featuring Chase Shakur.

== Discography ==
=== Albums & Extend Plays ===
Albums

| Title | Details |
|---|---|
| Proverb | Released: 25 September 2020; Label: Five Stone Records; Formats: streaming, digital download |
| No Longer in the Suburbs | Released: 11 May 2022; Label: Five Stone Records; Formats: streaming, digital download |
| No Longer in the Suburbs Deluxe | Released: 3 November 2022; Label: Five Stone Records; Formats: streaming, digital download |
| FOR THE BOY IN ME | Released: 27 September 2024; Label: Five Stone Records Inc.; Formats: streaming, digital download |

Extended plays

| Title | Details |
|---|---|
| Red Like Crimson | Released: 15 June 2018; Label: Prodigal; Formats: streaming, digital download |
| 3511 (2021) | Released: 6 August 2021; Label: Five Stone Records; Formats: streaming, digital download |
| Motherland Sessions (Live) (2025) | Released: 7 March 2025; Label: Five Stone Records Inc.; Formats: streaming, digital download |

=== Singles ===
- Twelve (2017)
- Too Fast (2018)
- Just Anybody (2019)
- Regrets (2021)
- Suppress (2022)
- Lifetime (2022)
- Open (Remix) (2022)
- Fly Girl (2023)
- LEMON TREES (2024)
- I LO<3 MY EX (2024)
- What I Gotta Do (2025)
- Brown Sugar (2025) (with Leon Thomas III)
- Stay Home (2025)
- He's Not Me (2025)
- Squeeze (2026)
- Rich Luv (2026) (featuring Chase Shakur)

== See also ==
- Coco Jones
- Josh Levi
- Normani
