= Jordan Raycroft (album) =

Studio album by Jordan Raycroft
- Released: April 16, 2013
- Recorded: 2013
- Genres: Folk, folk rock, alt-country
- Producers: Brad Dugas, Jordan Raycroft

Jordan Raycroft is the self-titled debut album from Canadian musician Jordan Raycroft. It was nominated for a Juno Award in 2014. In 2013 it received two GMA Canada Covenant Awards nominations for Folk/Roots Album of the Year and CD Artwork Design of the Year.

== Track listing ==
No.	Title	Length
1.	"Dancing with the Branches"	4:01
2.	"Cold Hands"	3:21
3.	"We the People"	4:59
4.	"Bonnie and Clyde"	4:07
5.	"Letter"	4:24
6.	"(Lord) I'm Yours"	3:56
7.	"Silence is Golden"	2:58
8.	"Dingoes"	3:11
9.	"Michael"	3:31
10.	"58 Edinburgh"	5:53
11.	"Amazon Woman"	4:17
