= Ryland James =

Canadian singer, songwriter and pianist

- Born: Ryland James Clark; 1999 (age 26–27); Belleville, Ontario, Canada
- Occupations: Singer; songwriter; pianist
- Years active: 2014–present
- Musical career
- Genres: Pop
- Label: Republic

Ryland James Clark (born 1999), known professionally as Ryland James, is a Canadian pop singer from Deseronto, Ontario, whose self-titled debut EP was released in 2020.

As a teenager, he was a competitor on the seventh and final season of The Next Star in 2014, finishing in fifth place. Professionally, he uses his middle name as his stage surname, so as to avoid potential confusion with British singer and presenter Rylan Clark.

He released his debut single "Good to You" in 2017, and followed up in 2019 with "Say Goodbye" and his breakthrough hit "In My Head". Through 2019, he toured as an opening act for Alessia Cara on her The Pains of Growing Tour; in February 2020, his fourth single "Shoulder to Cry On" was released. His self-titled EP was released in August 2020, and was followed in December by the Christmas release A Little Christmas.

James received two Juno Award nominations at the Juno Awards of 2021, for Pop Album of the Year and Breakthrough Artist of the Year.

He came out as queer in February 2021.

He sang the Canadian national anthem at the 2022 NBA All-Star Game.

In 2023, he participated in an all-star recording of Serena Ryder's single "What I Wouldn't Do", which was released as a charity single to benefit Kids Help Phone's Feel Out Loud campaign for youth mental health.

== Discography ==
=== Extended plays ===
Title	EP details
Ryland James	Released: August 21, 2020; Label: 21 Entertainment, Universal Music Canada; Format: Digital download; Track listing: 1. "Water"; 2. "In My Head"; 3. "Better Off"; 4. "Day Too Late"; 5. "Shoulder to Cry On"; 6. "This Moment"; 7. "Water (Acoustic)"
A Little Christmas	Released: October 23, 2020; Label: 21 Entertainment, Universal Music Canada; Format: Digital download; Track listing: 1. "Please Come Home for Christmas"; 2. "A Little Christmas"; 3. "Do You Hear What I Hear?"; 4. "All I Want For Christmas Is You"; 5. "Last Christmas"
Heart of Me	Released: May 23, 2025; Label: 21 Entertainment, Universal Music Canada; Format: Digital download; Track listing: 1. "The Reason"; 2. "Soul"; 3. "Heart of Me"; 4. "Pretty Things"; 5. "Long Way Home"; 6. "Good"; 7. "Thank the Rain"

=== Singles ===
==== As lead artist ====
Title	Year	Peak chart positions					Certifications	Album/EP
Title	Year	CAN	CAN AC	CAN CHR	CAN HAC	US Adult	Certifications	Album/EP
"Good to You"	2017	—	—	—	—	—		Non-album singles
"Say Goodbye"	2019	—	—	—	—	—		Non-album singles
"In My Head"	2019	85	9	33	33	—	MC: Gold	Ryland James
"Please Come Home for Christmas"	2019	—	5	—	—	—		A Little Christmas
"Shoulder to Cry On"	2020	—	—	—	—	—		Ryland James
"Better Off"	2020	—	—	—	—	—		Ryland James
"Water"	2020	—	23	38	36	39		Ryland James
"Blame"	2021	—	—	—	—	—		Non-album singles
"3 Purple Hearts"	2021	—	—	—	—	—		Non-album singles
"A Christmas to Remember" (featuring Ralph)	2021	—	4	—	—	—		Non-album singles
"I Give Everything"	2022	—	22	—	—	—		Non-album singles
"Patience"	2022	—	—	—	—	—		Non-album singles
"River"	2022	—	6	—	—	—		Non-album singles
"Love on the Brain"	2022	—	—	—	—	—		Non-album singles
"You're Still My Man"	2024	—	—	—	—	—		Non-album singles
"Heart of Me"	2024	—	—	—	—	—		Heart of Me
"The Reason"	2025	—	—	—	—	—		Heart of Me
"Thank the Rain"	2025	—	—	—	—	—		Heart of Me
"Long Way Home"	2025	—	—	—	—	—		Heart of Me
"Pretty Things"	2025	—	—	—	—	—		Heart of Me
"Soul"	2025	—	—	—	—	—		Heart of Me
"Good"	2025	—	—	—	—	—		Heart of Me
"—" denotes a recording that did not chart or was not released in that territory.

==== As featured artist ====
Title	Year	Peak chart positions				Album
Title	Year	CAN	CAN AC	CAN CHR	CAN HAC	Album
"Lean on Me" (as part of ArtistsCan)	2020	13	6	15	11	Non-album singles
"Save Me" (Shaun Frank featuring Ryland James)	2021	—	—	32	41	Non-album singles
"—" denotes a recording that did not chart or was not released in that territory.

=== Other charted songs ===
Title	Year	Peak chart positions	Album
Title	Year	CAN AC	Album
"A Little Christmas"	2020	5	A Little Christmas
"Last Christmas"	2020	34	A Little Christmas
"Do You Hear What I Hear"	2020	32	A Little Christmas
