= Juno Award for Indigenous Artist or Group of the Year =

Annual Canadian music award

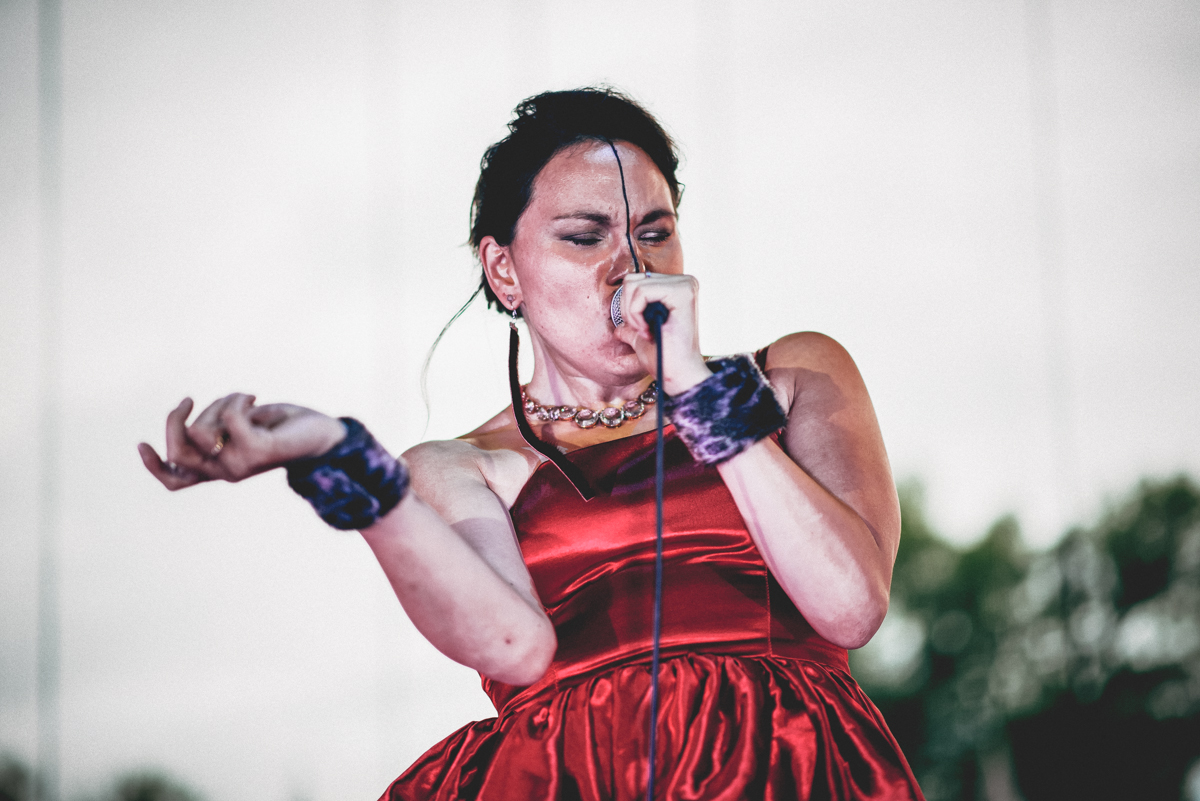
Singer Tanya Tagaq was the 2015 recipient of the award for her album Animism.

The Juno Award for Indigenous Music Album of the Year is an annual award presented by the Canadian Academy of Recording Arts and Sciences for the best album by an Indigenous Canadian artist or band. It was formerly known as Best Music of Aboriginal Canada Recording (1994–2002), Aboriginal Recording of the Year (2003–2009), and Aboriginal Album of the Year (2010–2016). Indigenous artists are not excluded from consideration in other genre or general interest categories; in fact, some indigenous musicians, most notably The Halluci Nation, have actively chosen not to submit their music in the indigenous category at all, instead pursuing nomination only in the more general categories.

The award faced controversy in its inaugural year, after nominee Sazacha Red Sky was accused of cultural appropriation. According to the surviving children of Chief Dan George, the writer of the song she had been nominated for, she was not personally a member of the Tsleil-Waututh First Nation and according to the George family did not have the right to record it under their cultural traditions. George's son Leonard sought a legal injunction to prevent the award from being presented at the Juno Awards ceremony at all, and a final compromise revising Red Sky's nomination to reflect the album instead of the song was announced on the morning of the ceremony.

More recently, some indigenous artists have called for the category to be discontinued, on the grounds that a dedicated indigenous category "ghettoizes" their music as a niche interest not relevant to non-indigenous music fans, while others have defended it as a platform for increasing the visibility of indigenous music, arguing that even though indigenous artists are eligible in all Juno award categories, relatively few indigenous artists actually receive such nominations due to their lack of mainstream prominence and the much wider range of competition for nomination slots.

In late 2019, the Junos announced plans to rename the category as Indigenous Artist or Group of the Year for the 2020 ceremony. While the category would still honour particular albums, the organization said the decision was made to address questions they received from Indigenous artists "who believe they're submitting to a category meant to shine a spotlight on the accomplishments of Indigenous people." The Junos suggested the change would likely "eliminate a lot of the confusion and put us in a better position to explain the need for the category, when challenged."

At the Juno Awards of 2021, it was announced further changes were being made for the Juno Awards of 2022, splitting the category into two new categories for Contemporary Indigenous Artist of the Year and Traditional Indigenous Artist of the Year.

In its lifetime, the award was won four times by singer-songwriter Buffy Sainte-Marie, all of which were revoked in March 2025. As the award was presented based on the indigenous character of the music rather than the ethnic heritage of the performer per se, the original questions around her indigeneity from 2023 did not impact her eligibility on their own; however, the 2025 revocation of her Order of Canada, on the grounds that she could no longer provide satisfactory proof of Canadian citizenship, led the Juno committee to revoke the awards.

== Winners ==
=== Best Music of Aboriginal Canada Recording (1994–2002) ===
Year	Winner(s)	Album	Nominees	Ref.
1994	Wapistan	Wapistan Is Lawrence Martin	"Booglatamooti (The Indian Song)" – J. Hubert Francis and Eagle Feather; "Grandfather" – J. Hubert Francis and Eagle Feather; "Stoney Park" – Stoney Park Singers; "The Prayer Song" (revised to Red Sky Rising) – Sazacha Red Sky	
1995	Susan Aglukark	Arctic Rose	Akua Tuta – Kashtin; Blue Voice/New Voice – Jani Lauzon; Music for the Native Americans – Robbie Robertson and The Red Road Ensemble; No Regrets – Tom Jackson	
1996	Jerry Alfred and the Medicine Beat	ETSI Shon "Grandfather Song"	Dancing Around the World – Red Bull; Message – Wapistan; Sacred Ground – Jess Lee; This Child – Susan Aglukark	
1997	Buffy Sainte-Marie	Up Where We Belong; Award revoked in 2025.	Freedom – Chester Knight and the Wind; Innu Town – Claude McKenzie; Go Back – Jerry Alfred and the Medicine Beat; Tudjaat – Tudjaat	
1998	Mishi Donovan	The Spirit Within	Little Island Cree - World Hand Drum Champions – Little Island Cree with Clayton Chief; Necessary – No Reservations; That Side of the Window – Tom Jackson; Walk Away – Fara Palmer	
1999	Robbie Robertson	Contact from the Underworld of Redboy	Hearts of the Nations – The 1997 Aboriginal Women's Voices Group; Message from a Drum – J. Hubert Francis and Eagle Feather; Thirst – Jani Lauzon; Welcome to the Playground – TKO	
2000	Chester Knight and the Wind	Falling Down	Love that Strong – Elizabeth Hill; To Bring Back Yesterday – Fara Palmer; Touch the Earth and Sky – Vern Cheechoo; World Hand Drum Champions '98 – Red Bull	
2001	Florent Vollant	Nipaiamianan	Figure Love Out – John Gracie; Journey Home – Mishi Donovan; Run As One – C-Weed; Unsung Heroes – Susan Aglukark	
2002	Eagle & Hawk	On and On	Crazy Maker – Marcel Gagnon; Dark Realm – Nakoda Lodge; My Ojibway Experience: Strength & Hope – Billy Joe Green; Riel's Road – Sandy Scofield	

=== Aboriginal Recording of the Year (2003–2009) ===
Year	Winner(s)	Album	Nominees	Ref.
2003	Derek Miller	Lovesick Blues	The Right Combination – Vern Cheechoo and Lawrence Martin; spirit world solid wood – Leela Gilday; Standing Strong – Chester Knight; Round Dance the Night Away – Randy Wood	
2004	Susan Aglukark	Big Feeling	The Avenue – Burnt Project 1; Mother Earth – Eagle & Hawk; Ketwam – Sandy Scofield; In Honour of Percy Dreaver – Whitefish Jrs.	
2005	Taima	Taima	Green Dress – Wayne Lavallee; Full Circle – Pappy Johns Band with Murray Porter; KATAKu – Florent Vollant; Pishimuss – Claude McKenzie	
2006	Burnt Project 1	Hometown	Life Is... – Eagle & Hawk; Muskrat Blues and Rock & Roll – Billy Joe Green; Rattle & Drum – Asani; Sinaa – Tanya Tagaq	
2007	Leela Gilday	Sedzé	Blood Red Earth – Susan Aglukark; Burn – Jason Burnstick; Seeds – Digging Roots; Stay Red – Northern Cree	
2008	Derek Miller	The Dirty Looks	Home and Native Land – Little Hawk; Nikawiy Askiy – Sandy Scofield; Phoenix – Fara Palmer; What It Takes – Donny Parenteau	
2009	Buffy Sainte-Marie	Running for the Drum; Award revoked in 2025.	Auk/Blood – Tanya Tagaq; First Law of the Land – Billy Joe Green; No Lies – Tracy Bone; The World (And Everything In It) – Team Rezofficial	

=== Aboriginal Album of the Year (2010–2016) ===
Year	Winner(s)	Album	Nominees	Ref.
2010	Digging Roots	We Are...	Distant Morning Star – Digawolf; Swagger – Lucie Idlout; Sing Soul Girl – Inez Jasper; Trail of Tears – Wayne Lavallee	
2011	CerAmony	CerAmony	The Black Star – Joey Stylez; Derek Miller with Double Trouble – Derek Miller; The Great Unknown – Eagle & Hawk; Vigilance – Little Hawk	
2012	Murray Porter	Songs Lived and Life Played	Speakers of Tomorrow – Bruthers of Different Muthers; One Nation – Flying Down Thunder and Rise Ashen; To Whom it May Concern – Donny Parenteau; The Gift of Life – Randy Wood	
2013	Crystal Shawanda	Just Like You	Heart on My Sleeve – Don Amero; The Black List – Burnt Project 1; Samples – Janet Panic; Bring It On – Donny Parenteau	
2014	George Leach	Surrender	Keep a Fire – Amanda Rheaume; Small Town Stories – Desiree Dorion; Burn Me Down – Inez Jasper; Road Renditions – Nathan Cunningham	
2015	Tanya Tagaq	Animism	The Whole World's Got the Blues – Crystal Shawanda; For the Light – Digging Roots; Heart of the People – Leela Gilday; The (Post) Mistress – Tomson Highway	
2016	Buffy Sainte-Marie	Power in the Blood; Award revoked in 2025.	The One – Armond Duck Chief; Come and Get Your Love: The Tribe Session – Black Bear; Rumble – Derek Miller; Refined – Don Amero	

=== Indigenous Music Album of the Year (2017–2021) ===
Year	Winner(s)	Album	Nominees	Ref.
2017	Quantum Tangle	Tiny Hands	Fish Out of Water – Crystal Shawanda; Round Dance & Beats (Powwow) – Bryden Gwiss Kiwenzie; Debut – Silla + Rise; Earthly Days – William Prince	
2018	Buffy Sainte-Marie	Medicine Songs; Award revoked in 2025.	PowWowStep – DJ Shub; Here & Now – Indian City; The Fight Within – Iskwé; Sedna – Kelly Fraser	
2019	Jeremy Dutcher	Wolastoqiyik Lintuwakonawa	The Ballad of the Runaway Girl – Elisapie; Nitisanak - Brother and Sister – Northern Cree; The Average Savage – Snotty Nose Rez Kids; Standing in the Light – Leonard Sumner	
2020	Celeigh Cardinal	Stories from a Downtown Apartment	Yellowstone – Digawolf; nipiy – nêhiyawak; Siqinnaarut – Northern Haze; ataataga – Riit	
2021	Leela Gilday	North Star Calling	Kîyânaw — Burnstick; Church House Blues — Crystal Shawanda; The Ridge — Julian Taylor; Nunarjua Isulinginniani — Terry Uyarak	

== See also ==
- Aboriginal music of Canada
- Aboriginal Canadian personalities
