= Juno Awards of 2006 =

Edition of Canadian music award

- Date: 1–2 April 2006
- Venue: Halifax Metro Centre, Halifax, Nova Scotia
- Hosted by: Pamela Anderson

Television/radio coverage
- Network: CTV

The Juno Awards of 2006 were held in Halifax, Nova Scotia, Canada on the weekend of 31 March to 2 April 2006. These ceremonies honour music industry achievements in Canada during the previous year.

The primary ceremonies were hosted by Pamela Anderson at the Halifax Metro Centre on 2 April and televised on CTV. Buck 65 was the ceremony's introduction and preview announcer. Music artists Bedouin Soundclash, Broken Social Scene, Divine Brown, Hedley, Massari and Nickelback performed songs at these ceremonies. Also performing were the co-winners for the 2006 International Album of the Year, The Black Eyed Peas and Coldplay.

Bryan Adams was the 2006 inductee into the Canadian Music Hall of Fame. Chris Martin of Coldplay introduced Adams at the primary ceremony.

Michael Bublé won four awards, more than any other individual that year. Besides winning Artist of the Year, his album It's Time won in both the Album of the Year and Pop Album of the Year categories. His song "Home" from that album was declared Single of the Year.

Awards for most categories were presented on 1 April in a non-televised ceremony at the Halifax World Trade and Convention Centre hosted by Jully Black, with performances by Kardinal Offishall, The Road Hammers and Martha Wainwright. This Saturday gala included the presentation of the Junos' first Humanitarian award to Bruce Cockburn. The Walt Grealis Special Achievement Award was given to True North Records founder Bernie Finkelstein.

== International telecast ==
The 2006 awards were the first to be televised by broadcasters outside Canada, as seen on the following MTV-related operations:

- Australia (VH1)
- China (MTV)
- India (VH1)
- Italy (MTV)
- Latin America (VH1)
- Malaysia (MTV Asia)
- Portugal (MTV)
- Singapore (MTV Asia)
- Taiwan (MTV Asia)
- United Kingdom (VH1)
- United States (MTV2)

== Controversy ==
During the televised ceremony, a commercial aired congratulating Michael Bublé for his Single of the Year victory, half an hour before the award was announced.

Both CTV and Warner Music Canada have indicated that they did not, in fact, have advance knowledge that Bublé was the actual winner. As is normal practice, Warner had prepared a number of contingency ads congratulating its artists, to be aired only in the event that the artist in question was actually named a winner. CTV has confirmed that its control room technicians mistakenly aired the Bublé ad in place of another congratulatory announcement.

Host of the show, Pamela Anderson made numerous failed attempts to joke during the show and spoke out against the seal hunt, which elicited loud boos from the audience. Quotes included, "One of my favourite artists couldn't be here tonight; Seal. He was afraid he might get clubbed to death."

== Nominees and winners ==
=== Artist of the Year ===
Winner: Michael Bublé

Other nominees:

- Boom Desjardins
- Rex Goudie
- Diana Krall
- Kalan Porter

=== Group of the Year ===
Winner: Nickelback

Other nominees:

- Barenaked Ladies
- Blue Rodeo
- Our Lady Peace
- Theory of a Deadman

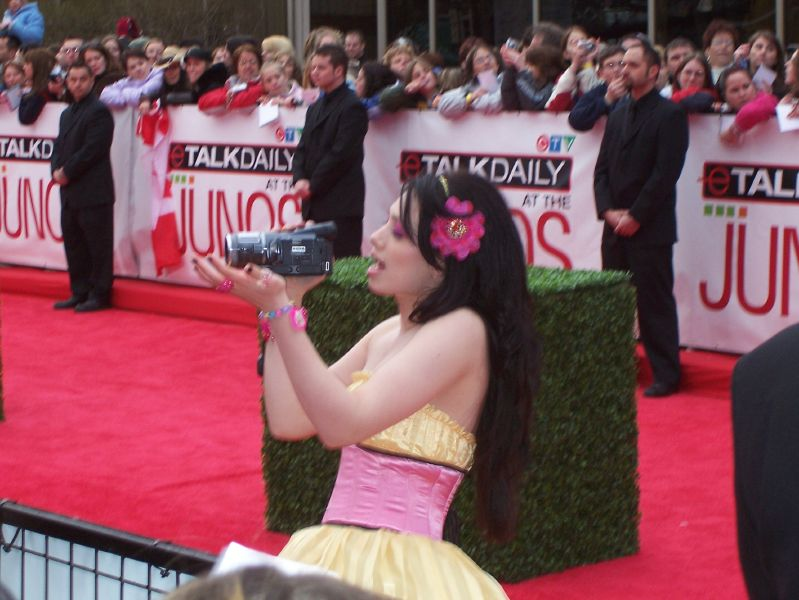
Skye Sweetnam at the 2006 Juno Awards

=== New Artist of the Year ===
Winner: Daniel Powter

Other nominees:

- Divine Brown
- Jonas
- Skye Sweetnam
- Martha Wainwright

=== New Group of the Year ===
Winner: Bedouin Soundclash

Other nominees:

- Boys Night Out
- Hedley
- Pocket Dwellers
- Silverstein

=== Jack Richardson Producer of the Year ===
Winner: Neil Young: "The Painter" by Neil Young

Other nominees:

- Jann Arden and Russell Broom: "Where No One Knows Me" and "Willing To Fall Down" by Jann Arden
- David Foster: "Feeling Good" and "Home" by Michael Bublé
- Nickelback (co-producer Joey Moi): "Animals" and "Photograph" by Nickelback
- Garth Richardson: "Gunnin" and "Villain" by Hedley

=== Recording Engineer of the Year ===
Winner: Vic Florencia: "Everyday is a Holiday" and "Melancholy Melody" by Esthero

Other nominees:

- Russell Broom: "God Bless The American Housewife" by SHeDaisy, "Where No One Knows Me" by Jann Arden
- Adam Messinger and Dylan Bell: "Dry Cleaner from Des Moines" and "Sittin' In the Cellar" by Cadence
- Randy Staub: "Angels Losing Sleep" by Our Lady Peace, "Animals" by Nickelback
- Denis Tougas: "Oleander" by Sarah Harmer, "Independent Thief" by Kathleen Edwards

=== Songwriter of the Year ===
Winner: Arcade Fire: "Neighborhood #3 (Power Out)" (with Josh Deu), "Rebellion (Lies)", "Wake Up"

Other nominees:

- Kathleen Edwards: "Back to Me" (with Colin Cripps), "Copied Keys", "In State"
- Joel Plaskett: "Happen Now", "Lying on a Beach", "Natural Disaster"
- Ronald Eldon Sexsmith: "Lemonade Stand", "Listen", "One Less Shadow"
- Neil Young: "The Painter", "Prairie Wind", "When God Made Me"

=== Fan Choice Award ===
Winner: Simple Plan

Other nominees:

- Celine Dion
- Diana Krall
- Michael Bublé
- Nickelback

=== Nominated albums ===
==== Album of the Year ====
Winner: It's Time, Michael Bublé

Other nominees:

- All The Right Reasons, Nickelback
- Christmas Songs, Diana Krall
- 219 Days, Kalan Porter
- Under The Lights, Rex Goudie

==== Aboriginal Recording of the Year ====
Winner: Hometown, Burnt Project 1

Other nominees:

- Life Is..., Eagle & Hawk
- Muskrat Blues and Rock & Roll, Billy Joe Green
- Rattle & Drum, Asani
- Sinaa, Tanya Tagaq

==== Adult Alternative Album of the Year ====
Winner: Prairie Wind, Neil Young

Other nominees:

- Are You Ready, Blue Rodeo
- Back to Me, Kathleen Edwards
- Broken (and other rogue states), Luke Doucet
- Ex-Girlfriends, Low Millions

==== Alternative Album of the Year ====
Winner: Broken Social Scene, Broken Social Scene

Other nominees:

- Elevator, Hot Hot Heat
- Live It Out, Metric
- So Jealous, Tegan and Sara
- Twin Cinema, The New Pornographers

==== Blues Album of the Year ====
Winner: Let It Loose, Kenny "Blues Boss" Wayne

Other nominees:

- The Gas and the Clutch, The Perpetrators
- Songs of Vice and Sorrow, Julian Fauth
- Villanelle, Paul Reddick
- Voice + Story, Harrison Kennedy

==== CD/DVD Artwork Design of the Year ====
Winner: Hipeponymous by The Tragically Hip: Garnet Armstrong, Rob Baker, Susan Michalek, Will Ruocco

Other nominees:

- Broken Social Scene by Broken Social Scene: Kevin Drew, Christopher Mills, Justin Peroff, Louise Upperton
- In A Coma: 1995–2005 by Matthew Good: Garnet Armstrong, Matthew Good, Ivan Otis
- A Story-Gram From Vinyl Café Inc. by Stuart McLean: Seth
- 2005 Album by Wintersleep: Jud Haynes, James Mejia

==== Children's Album of the Year ====
Winner: Baroque Adventure: The Quest for Arundo Donax, Tafelmusik Baroque Orchestra

Other nominees:

- A Butterfly in Time, CMSM Concert Theatre Productions
- Canada Needs You (Volume One), Mike Ford
- The Fabulous Song, Michelle Campagne and Davy Gallant
- Happy All of the Time, Jake

==== Contemporary Christian/Gospel Album of the Year ====
Winner: Amanda Falk, Amanda Falk

Other nominees:

- The Art of Breaking, Thousand Foot Krutch
- In This Time, Patricia Shirley
- Livin' for Something, Janelle
- MMHMM, Relient K

==== Classical Album of the Year (large ensemble) ====
Winner: Beethoven: Symphonies nos. 5 et 6, Tafelmusik Baroque Orchestra, Bruno Weil

Other nominees:

- J.S. Bach: Keyboard Concertos Vol. 1, Angela Hewitt, Australian Chamber Orchestra, Richard Tognetti
- Concerti Virtuosi, Tafelmusik Baroque Orchestra, Jeanne Lamon
- Freitas Branco: Violin Concerto, Alexandre Da Costa, Extremadura Symphony Orchestra, Jesús Amigo
- Telemann: Tutti flauti!, Arion Ensemble, Jaap ter Linden

==== Classical Album of the Year (solo or chamber ensemble) ====
Winner: Albéniz: Iberia, Marc-André Hamelin

Other nominees:

- Awakening, St. Lawrence String Quartet
- Folklore, Denise Djokic and David Jalbert
- J.S. Bach: Sonates pour violon et clavecin, Vol. 1, James Ehnes and Luc Beauséjour
- Magic Horn, Canadian Brass

==== Classical Album of the Year (vocal or choral performance) ====
Winner: Viardot-Garcia: Lieder Chansons Canzoni Mazurkas, Isabel Bayrakdarian, Serouj Kradjian

Other nominees:

- Hyver, Karina Gauvin, Les Boréades, Francis Colpron
- Scarlatti: Stabat Mater, Emma Kirkby, Daniel Taylor, Theatre of Early Music
- Schubert: Die schöne Müllerin, Michael Schade, Malcolm Martineau
- Schubert: Winterreise, Russell Braun, Carolyn Maule

==== Francophone Album of the Year ====
Winner: Pages blanches, Jim Corcoran

Other nominees:

- Garde la tête haute, Senaya
- Hors de tout doute, France D'Amour
- Sur le fil, Stéphanie Lapointe
- Le trashy saloon, Anik Jean

==== International Album of the Year ====
Winners (tie): Monkey Business, The Black Eyed Peas and X&Y, Coldplay

Other nominees:

- Breakaway, Kelly Clarkson
- Love. Angel. Music. Baby., Gwen Stefani
- The Massacre, 50 Cent

==== Instrumental Album of the Year ====
Winner: Belladonna, Daniel Lanois

Other nominees:

- Balance, Tomas Hamilton aka Charles T. Cozens
- Christmas Serenity, George Carlaw aka Yuri Sazonoff
- Rainy Days and Mondays, Nancy Walker
- Sentimental Strings, Bobby Creed & His Orchestra aka Roberto Occhipinti

==== Contemporary Jazz Album of the Year ====
Winner: Radio Guantánamo (Guantánamo Blues Project Vol. 1), Jane Bunnett

Other nominees:

- Encuentro en la Habana, Hilario Durán and Perspectiva
- One Take: Volume Two, Marc Rogers, Robi Botos, Phil Dwyer, Terri Lyne Carrington
- Shurum Burum Jazz Circus, David Buchbinder
- Yemaya, Roberto Occhipinti

==== Traditional Jazz Album of the Year ====
Winner: Ask Me Later, Don Thompson Quartet

Other nominees:

- In a Sentimental Mood, Ian McDougall Quintet
- Let Me Tell You About My Day, Phil Dwyer with Alan Jones and Rodney Whitaker
- Mainly Mingus, Dave Young Quintet
- Time Flies, P.J. Perry

==== Vocal Jazz Album of the Year ====
Winner: Christmas Songs, Diana Krall

Other nominees:

- Just You, Just Me, Ranee Lee
- Rock Swings, Paul Anka
- Sophie Milman, Sophie Milman
- Twenty For One, Cadence

==== Pop Album of the Year ====
Winner: It's Time, Michael Bublé

Other nominees:

- Boom Desjardins, Boom Desjardins
- Jann Arden, Jann Arden
- These Old Charms, Theresa Sokyrka
- 219 Days, Kalan Porter

==== Rock Album of the Year ====
Winner: All the Right Reasons, Nickelback

Other nominees:

- Gasoline, Theory of a Deadman
- Healthy in Paranoid Times, Our Lady Peace
- Hedley, Hedley
- Jonas, Jonas

==== Roots and Traditional Album of the Year (Solo) ====
Winner: Hair in My Eyes Like a Highland Steer, Corb Lund

Other nominees:

- Love Sweet Love, Lynn Miles
- Mantras For Madmen, Harry Manx
- Récidive, Yves Lambert
- Songs From The Gravel Road, Ian Tyson

==== Roots and Traditional Album of the Year (Group) ====
Winner: The Duhks, The Duhks

Other nominees:

- Ambassador, Elliott Brood
- Destination Unknown, Sexsmith and Kerr
- The Hard and the Easy, Great Big Sea
- Malins plaisirs, Genticorum

==== World Music Album of the Year ====
Winner: Humo de tabaco, Alex Cuba Band

Other nominees:

- Capivara, Celso Machado
- Djama, Alpha Yaya Diallo
- Fusion, Adham Shaikh
- Gaïa, Gaïa

=== Nominated releases ===
==== Single of the Year ====
Winner: "Home", Michael Bublé

Other nominees:

- "When the Night Feels My Song", Bedouin Soundclash
- "Inside and Out", Feist
- "Man I Used To Be", k-os
- "Photograph", Nickelback

==== Classical Composition of the Year ====
Winner: "String Quartet No. 1 (The Awakening)", Christos Hatzis

Other nominees:

- "Illuminations", Brian Cherney
- "Our Finest Hour", Chan Ka Nin
- "Illuminations", Peter Togni
- "Symphony for Strings", Robert Turner

==== Country Recording of the Year ====
Winner: The Road Hammers, The Road Hammers

Other nominees:

- Amanda Wilkinson, Amanda Wilkinson
- Hey, Do You Know Me, Lisa Brokop
- Life Goes On, Terri Clark
- Waitin' on the Wonderful, Aaron Lines

==== Dance Recording of the Year ====
Winner: "Spanish Fly", Hatiras & Macca featuring Shawna B.

Other nominees:

- "Hot Box", Da Skunk
- "Robopop", M1
- "She's Looking Good", Boza
- "Walkin & Talkin", Ray Charles vs Dio

==== Music DVD of the Year ====
Winner: Hipeponymous, The Tragically Hip

Other nominees:

- À la station C, Ariane Moffatt
- Live at the Montréal Jazz Festival, Diana Krall
- LIVE 8 – Toronto, Various Artists
- ¿Publicity Stunt?, K-os

==== R&B/Soul Recording of the Year ====
Winner: Back for More, Shawn Desman

Other nominees:

- Divine Brown, Divine Brown
- Massari, Massari
- "The Naughty Song", Cory Lee
- This Is Me, Jully Black

==== Rap Recording of the Year ====
Winner: The Dusty Foot Philosopher, K'Naan

Other nominees:

- Boy-Cott-In the Industry, Classified
- Fire and Glory, Kardinal Offishall
- It's Called Life, Eternia
- United We Fall, Sweatshop Union

==== Reggae Recording of the Year ====
Winner: Reggae Time, Blessed

Other nominees:

- Hot Gal featuring Rally Bop, Carl Henry
- Live Up, Truths and Rights
- Mind & Body Sold, Odel
- River of Healing, Jah Beng

=== Video of the Year ===
Winner: "Devil's Eyes" by Buck 65 – producer: Micah Meisner, Rich Terfry

Other nominees:

- "Bom Bom Bom" by Living Things – producer: Floria Sigismondi
- "Con Toda Palabra" by Lhasa de Sela – producer: Ralph Dfouni, Brigitte Henry
- "Neighborhood #3 (Power Out)" by Arcade Fire – producer: Plates Animation
- "Rebellion (Lies)" by Arcade Fire – producer: Chris Grismer
