= Chester Knight =

Canadian singer-songwriter

- Born: 1955 or 1956 (age 69–70); Muskoday First Nation, Saskatchewan, Canada
- Genres: Folk
- Instruments: Vocals, guitar
- Formerly of: Chester Knight and the Wind

Chester Knight (born 1955/1956) is a Canadian folk singer-songwriter from Saskatchewan. He is most noted for the 1999 album Falling Down, which won the Juno Award for Best Aboriginal Recording at the Juno Awards of 2000.

== Background ==
A Cree musician originally from the Muskoday First Nation near Prince Albert, Knight also worked as an academic counsellor at the Saskatchewan Indian Federated College, later known as First Nations University of Canada, in Saskatoon.

He is the uncle of musician Eekwol.

== Musical career ==
He was initially active in music as leader of the band Chester Knight and the Wind, in which he was the sole constant member; other supporting musicians over the band's lifetime included his brother Vernon Knight on backing vocals, bass player Darryl Ross, lead guitarists Malcolm Pooyak and Todd Duncan, and drummers K.K. Nogada, Robin Turner and Hal Schrenk.

In 1996 the band released its debut album Freedom, which was shortlisted for Best Aboriginal Recording at the Juno Awards of 1997. Falling Down followed in 1999; in addition to its Juno Award win, the album won a Prairie Music Award and an Aboriginal Music Award. The following year, Falling Down was reissued in the United States with the alternate title Windfall.

Knight released the album Standing Strong in 2002 as a solo artist, although he still toured under the band name. Guest musicians on the album included Brandon Friesen, Lucie Idlout, Derek Miller and Paul Carrack. The album was again a Juno nominee for Aboriginal Recording at the Juno Awards of 2003, and Knight won Songwriter of the Year for "Cochise Was a Warrior" at the Aboriginal Music Awards. In 2004, his music video for "Love Fades Away" won the award for Best Music Video at the American Indian Film Festival.

With his band now consisting of his sons Lancelot and Daniel, a new album was in the planning stages in 2004. The album did not materialize, although Knight continued to perform selected festival tour dates in Western Canada.

In 2013, he released "Idle No More (Tomahawk)", a song inspired by the Idle No More activist movement which was his first new release since Standing Strong. He followed up in 2015 with the single "Indian Girl".
