= Perpetrator =

Perpetrator or Perpetrators may refer to:

== Law enforcement ==
- Someone who committed a crime
- A suspect who is accused or suspected of committing a crime

== Studies ==
- Perpetrators, victims, and bystanders, a typology in genocide studies
- Perpetrator studies, the academic study of perpetrators of mass killings and/or political violence

== Art and entertainment ==
- Perpetrator (film), a 2023 American-French horror film
- The Perpetrators, a Canadian rock/blues band
  - The Perpetrators (album), a 2003 album by The Perpetrators
