= Burn Me Down =

Burn Me Down may refer to:

- Burn Me Down (album), an album by Inez Jasper, or the title song
- "Burn Me Down" (song), a song by Marty Stuart
- "Burn Me Down", a 2016 song by Nathan Sykes from Unfinished Business
