= Alice Ramsey =

Alice Ramsey or Ramsay may refer to:

- Alicia Ramsey (1864–1933), British writer often known as Alice Ramsey
- Alice Huyler Ramsey (1886–1983), first woman to drive an automobile across America
- Alice Ramsay, musician on the album Tow Truck
