= Sunglasses (disambiguation) =

Sunglasses refers to the sun blocking eyewear.

Sunglasses may also refer to:

- Sun Glasses (song), a 1965 song by Skeeter Davis, later covered in 1984 by Tracey Ullman
- Sunglasses (Divine Brown song), a 2009 song by Divine Brown
- Sunglasses (Black Country, New Road song), a 2019 and 2021 song by Black Country, New Road
- Sunglass (film), a 2013 Indian film
