= Sedzé =

Studio album by Leela Gilday
- Released: November 22, 2006
- Genre: Folk/roots
- Label: Diva Sound Records

Leela Gilday chronology
Spirit World, Solid Wood (2002)	Sedzé (2006)

Sedzé is an album by Leela Gilday that won the 2007 Juno Award for Aboriginal Recording of the Year. The title means "my heart" in the North Slavey language.

== Track listing ==
1. "Dene Love Song" – 4:55
2. "Time Rushes By" – 2:35
3. "Avoid the Undertow" – 3:52
4. "If We Were One" – 5:55
5. "Shine On" – 4:35
6. "Sing" – 3:49
7. "Temporary Measure" – 3:42
8. "Ride Horseman" – 4:19
9. "One Drum" – 4:02
10. "Myself" – 4:34
11. "Common Goal" – 4:07
12. "Untitled" – 2:21
