= Stick Em Up =

Stick 'Em Up

Studio album by the Perpetrators
- Released: 2013
- Genre: Rock-blues
- Length: 42:56
- Label: Self-released

The Perpetrators chronology
Live at the High & Lonesome Club (2008)	Stick 'Em Up (2013)

Stick 'Em Up is the fifth studio album by Canadian rock-blues band The Perpetrators, released in 2013. The album is autobiographical, telling the story of two times that the lead guitarist Jason Nowicki, was held at gunpoint.

Radio DJ Walter de Paduwa (Dr Boogie) described the album as: "The dirtiest stuff you made [sic] so far, and the more accessible for my greasy ears..."

== Track listing ==
1. "Sweetgrass" – 2:32
2. "Spend More Money" – 3:25
3. "You've Got to Tell Me" – 3:59
4. "Smokes 'n Chicken" – 5:53
5. "Tired of Tryin to Keep My Cool" – 5:10
6. "I Must Be Crazy" – 4:32
7. "Who's It Gonna Be" – 3:13
8. "Shake It" – 5:31
9. "Bad Man" – 4:35
10. "Take You On" – 4:01
