= The Love Chronicles =

Studio album by Divine Brown
- Released: August 19, 2008
- Recorded: 2007–2008
- Genre: R&B, soul, electronic
- Length: 56:06
- Label: Warner Music Canada

Divine Brown chronology
Divine Brown (2005)	The Love Chronicles (2008)	Something Fresh (2013)

Singles from The Love Chronicles
- 1. "Lay It on the Line" Released: May 27, 2008; 2. "Meet Me at the Roxy" Released: October 14, 2008; 3. "Sunglasses" Released: February 3, 2009; 4. "One More Chance" Released: September 15, 2009

Professional ratings
Review scores
Source	Rating
AllMusic	4.5/5 stars
Billboard	(positive)
The Ottawa Citizen	(positive)

The Love Chronicles is the second studio album by Canadian R&B singer Divine Brown.

The song "Bebe" appears in the 2009 video game Just Dance.

== Track listing ==
1. "Lay It on the Line" – 3:41
2. "Bebe" – 3:14
3. "Meet Me at the Roxy" – 3:32
4. "I Need Your Love" – 3:14
5. "Sweet Surrender" – 3:38
6. "Next Best Thing" – 3:30
7. "Boogie Slide" – 4:48
8. "One More Chance" – 4:31
9. "Best Friend" – 3:39
10. "Sunglasses" (featuring Nelly Furtado) – 3:55
11. "It's Over" – 4:36
12. "Jump Start" – 4:00
13. "Dirty Day" – 2:12

Bonus tracks:

14. "Lay It on the Line" (The Starting From Scratch + Solitair Retouch) – 3:44
15. "Dance with Me" – 3:52

iTunes bonus:

16. "Lay It on the Line" (Music Video) – 3:46

== Awards ==
Year	Award	Category	Result
2009	Juno Awards	R&B/Soul Recording of the Year	Won
2009	Juno Awards	Single of the Year ("Lay It on the Line")	Nominated
