= Old Skool Love =

Single by Divine Brown

from the album Divine Brown
- Released: March 2005
- Genre: R&B, Soul
- Length: 3:26
- Label: Blacksmith Entertainment Ltd./Universal Music Canada
- Songwriters: M. Brown, James Bryan
- Producer: Bryan

Divine Brown singles chronology
| "Old Skool Love" (2005) | "U Shook Me (All Night Long)" (2005) |

"Old Skool Love" is a song by Canadian R&B/Soul singer Divine Brown. Released in March 2005 as the lead single from her self-titled debut album, the single was successful in Canada, reaching the top 10 in several different categories.

== Covers ==
Canadian Idol winner Eva Avila performed the song on Canadian Idol during the Top 4.

== Charts ==
| Chart (2005) | Peak position |
|---|---|
| Canada AC Top 30 (Radio & Records) | 6 |
| Canada CHR/Pop Top 30 (Radio & Records) | 6 |
| Canada Hot AC Top 30 (Radio & Records) | 9 |
