= Sunglasses (Divine Brown song) =

2009 single by Divine Brown

Single by Divine Brown

from the album The Love Chronicles
- Released: 2009
- Genre: R&B
- Length: 3:46
- Label: Warner Music Canada
- Songwriter(s): Divine Brown, Nelly Furtado, Byram Joseph
- Producer(s): Slakah the Beatchild

Divine Brown singles chronology
| "Meet Me At The Roxy" (2008) | "Sunglasses" (2009) | "One More Chance" (2009) |

Sunglasses is the third single released by Canadian R&B singer-songwriter Divine Brown, from her second album The Love Chronicles (2008). The song samples Corey Hart’s 1984 track, Sunglasses at Night.. A version co-written by and featuring Canadian singer Nelly Furtado was released, along with a version featuring Canadian rapper Kardinal Offishall

== Charts ==
| Chart (2009) | Peak position |
|---|---|
| Canada (Canadian Hot 100) | 22 |

=== Year-end charts ===
| Chart (2009) | Position |
|---|---|
| Canadian Hot 100 | 87 |
