= J. Hubert Francis and Eagle Feather =

J. Hubert Francis and Eagle Feather is a Mi'kmaq rock music group from Canada. They are most noted as three-time Juno Award nominees for Best Music of Aboriginal Canada Recording, receiving a dual nomination at the Juno Awards of 1994 for their songs "Booglatamooti (The Indian Song)" and "Grandfather" and a nomination at the Juno Awards of 1999 for their album Message from a Drum.

The band is led by Hubert Francis, a musician from the Elsipogtog First Nation in New Brunswick. The band's supporting lineup has varied at different times, including both Mi'kmaq and non-Mi'kmaq musicians; at the time of Message from a Drum, the band included guitarist Jason Ratchford, bassist Peter Christmas, chanter and percussionist Justin Francis, and drummer Sean Parris.

The band first emerged in 1990, when their single "Lady of the Evening" was a minor country music hit in both Canada and the United States. They released the albums Reverence in 1993, No Boundaries in 1995 and Message from a Drum in 1998. As with many other First Nations musicians in this era, their music blended elements of First Nations music with mainstream popular music rather than pursuing a fully traditional sound.

They did not release any further albums after Message from a Drum, but have continued to perform primarily within New Brunswick as well as selected festival dates elsewhere in Canada and Europe. In 2012, they headlined the East Coast Music Awards' new showcase night for First Nations performers, and in 2019, Francis was awarded the ECMAs' Lifetime Achievement Award.
