= Mishi Donovan =

Canadian actress

Mishi Donovan (1964 - 2013) was a Chippewa Cree, Canadian actress, musician, First Nations activist and HIV/AIDS educator.

A Chippewa Cree originally from the Turtle Mountain region, she was taken from her birth family in the Sixties Scoop and was raised entirely by white foster families. In the 1980s, Donovan was a court worker with Native Counselling Services in Edmonton, Alberta, and later became a director of Feathers of Hope, a First Nations HIV/AIDS charity, after her adopted brother Ken Ward came out as HIV-positive.

Having long written and performed music as a personal hobby, she signed to Sunshine Records in 1993 after submitting some demo recordings to the label, and released her debut album Spirit in Flight in 1995. She followed up with two further albums, The Spirit Within in 1997 and Journey Home in 2000. The Spirit Within won the Juno Award for Aboriginal Album of the Year at the Juno Awards of 1998, and Journey Home was a shortlisted nominee for the same award at the Juno Awards of 2001.

As an actress, Donovan had roles in the television series Big Bear and MythQuest.

Late in her life, Donovan revealed that she had been diagnosed with dystonia, and died in 2013 at age 48.

== Discography ==
- Spirit in Flight (1995)
- The Spirit Within (1997)
- Journey Home (2000)
