= Jay Gilday =

Canadian musician

- Born: Yellowknife, Northwest Territories, Canada
- Genres: Folk music
- Occupation: Musician
- Instruments: Vocals; guitar

Jay Gilday is an Indigenous folk musician from Canada.

== Life and career ==
Gilday was born in Yellowknife, Northwest Territories, and spent his youth there. He is a member of the Dene Nation through his mother, with his father being of Irish heritage. He is the brother of singer-songwriter Leela Gilday. After high school, he attended the University of Alberta, where he spent much time as a busker in Edmonton's LRT system. He was later featured in an episode of the television series Dene: A Journey that filmed his return to the Dene Nation later in life.

Gilday performs both with an eponymous eight-piece rock band and as a solo artist. In 2017, he was a recipient of a Western Canadian Music Award for his album Faster than Light, being named Indigenous Artist of the Year.

=== Albums ===
Gilday's first album, All That I Can Give for Now, was released in 2008. In 2016, he followed up with Faster Than Light. In 2019, Gilday released The Choice and the Chase, his third album.

== Personal life ==
Gilday has four children.

== Discography ==
- All That I Can Give for Now (2008)
- Faster Than Light (2016)
- The Choice and the Chase (2019)
