= Inez Jasper =

Canadian musician

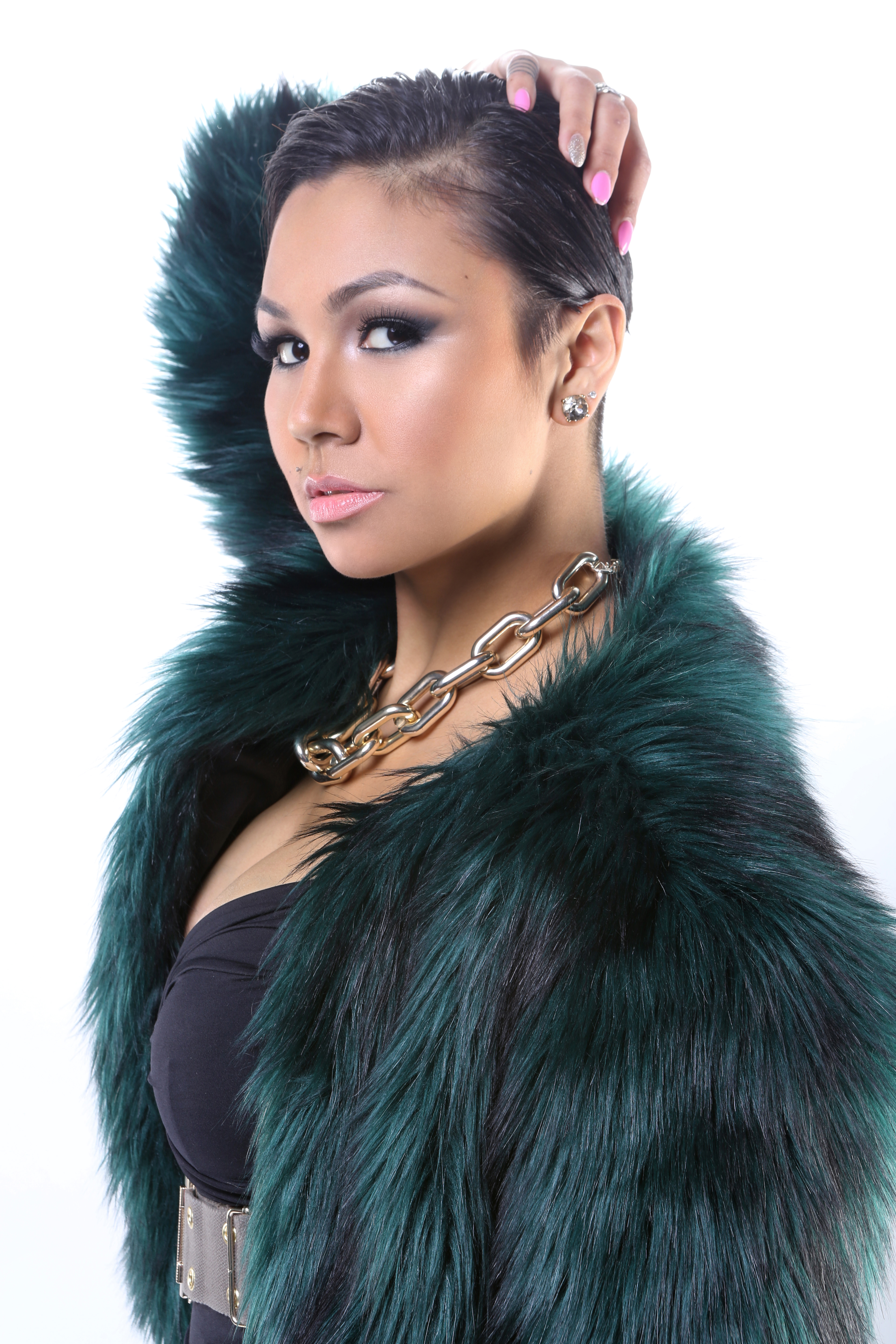

Background information
- Born: Inez Point; May 19, 1981 (age 45); Chilliwack, British Columbia
- Genres: Pop, R&B
- Occupations: Singer-songwriter, nurse
- Instrument: Vocals
- Years active: 2009–present
- Label: Lets'emot Music

Inez Jasper (née Point), also known as Inez, (born May 19, 1981) is a Canadian musician, whose music blends pop, dance, hip hop and traditional First Nations music.

She is most noted as a two-time nominee for the Juno Award for Aboriginal Album of the Year, in 2010 for her album Singsoulgirl and in 2014 for her album Burn Me Down.

== Biography ==
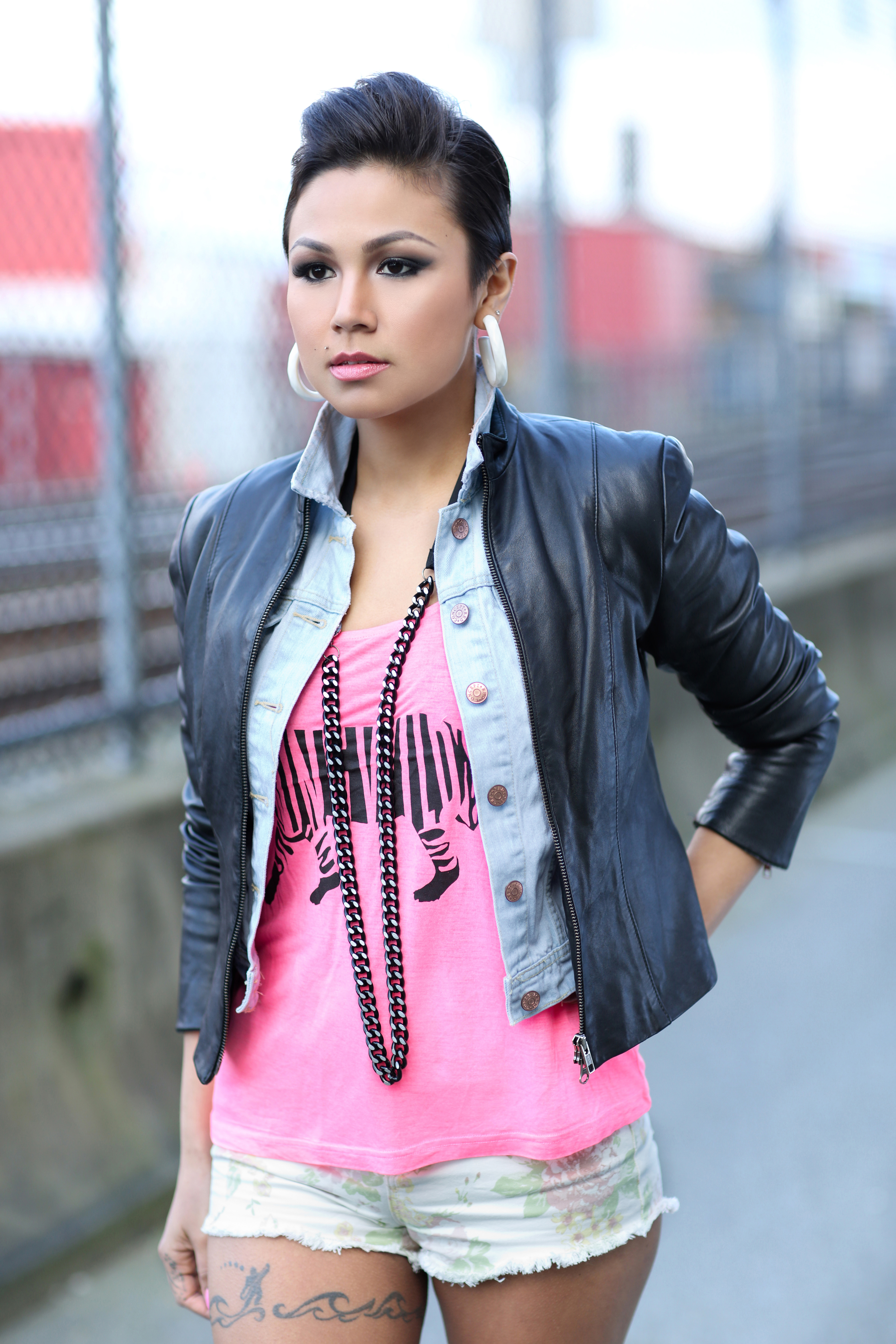
Inez Jasper

Inez Jasper was born and raised in Chilliwack, British Columbia. She is of Sto:lo, Ojibway and Métis heritage. She is the daughter of Mark Point, a former Skowkale First Nation chief, and the niece of Steven Point, a former Lieutenant Governor of British Columbia.

She was educated as a registered nurse, and works as a community health nurse for Stó:lō Nation Health Services. She has two children, and in 2010 her husband Otis Jasper served as the chief of Soowahlie First Nation.

She released her debut single "Sto:lo Strong" in 2005, before releasing the full-length album SingSoulGirl in January 2009. She toured extensively to support the album, and won awards at both the Aboriginal Peoples Choice Music Awards and the Western Canadian Music Awards. At the APCMAs, "Breathe" won Single of the Year, SingSoulGirl won Pop Album of the Year, and Jasper won Best New Artist.

She subsequently released two non-album singles, "Make U Mine" in 2011 and "Dancin' on the Run" in 2013, before releasing her second album Burn Me Down in August 2013. The album again won the award for Pop Album of the Year at the APCMAs, and was again a Juno Award nominee for Aboriginal Album of the Year. Jasper was also named Best Producer/Engineer at the APCMAs in 2014.

She was named a National Aboriginal Role Model by the National Aboriginal Health Organization in 2008.

== Discography ==
=== Studio albums ===
Studio albums by Inez Jasper
Year	Album title	Release details
2009	Singsoulgirl	Released: Jan 9, 2009; Label: Lets'emot Music; Format: CD, digital
2013	Burn Me Down	Released: Aug 1, 2013; Label: Lets'emot Music; Format: CD, digital

=== Singles ===
Selected songs by Inez Jasper
Year	Title	Album	Release details
2005	"Sto:lo Strong"	KAYA mixtape/Singsoulgirl	First release (April 2005)
2009	"Breathe"	Singsoulgirl	Lets'emot Music (Jan 9, 2009)
2011	"Make U Mine"	Non-album single	Rockstar Music Corp (Feb 1, 2011)
2013	"Dancin' on the Run"	Non-album single	Lets'emot Music (May 15, 2013)
2013	"The Takeover" (ft. Jon C)	Burn Me Down	Lets'emot Music (Aug 1, 2013)
2013	"Fallen Soldier" (ft. Fawn Wood)	Burn Me Down	Lets'emot Music (Aug 1, 2013)

=== Guest appearances ===
Selected songs featuring Inez Jasper
Year	Single name	Primary artist(s)	Album	Release details
2013	"Me & U" (ft. Inez Jasper)	Drezus	Red Winter	Rezofficial Music (May 17, 2013)

== Awards and nominations ==
Year	Award	Nominated work	Category	Result
2009	Aboriginal People's; Choice Music Awards	Singsoulgirl	Pop Album of the Year	Won
2009	Aboriginal People's; Choice Music Awards	Singsoulgirl	Best Album Cover Design	Won
2009	Aboriginal People's; Choice Music Awards	"Breathe"	Single of the Year	Won
2009	Aboriginal People's; Choice Music Awards	Inez Jasper	Best New Artist	Won
2009	West Coast American; Indian Music Awards	Inez Jasper	Best Vocals	Won
2009	West Coast American; Indian Music Awards	Inez Jasper	Best R&B	Won
2010	Western Canadian Music Awards	Singsoulgirl	Aboriginal Recording of the Year	Nominated
2010	Juno Awards	Singsoulgirl	Aboriginal Album of the Year	Nominated
2014	Western Canadian Music Awards	Burn Me Down	Aboriginal Recording of the Year	Nominated
2014	Juno Awards	Burn Me Down	Aboriginal Album of the Year	Nominated
2014	Aboriginal People's; Choice Music Awards	Burn Me Down	Best Pop Album	Won
2014	Aboriginal People's; Choice Music Awards	Inez	Best Producer/Engineer	Won

== See also ==
- Indigenous music of Canada
- Music of Canada
- Canadian hip-hop
