= Finjan (band) =

Canadian klezmer band

Finjan (Note: see Finjan for the meaning of the name. In the culture of Israel, finjan, a coffee pot with a long handle has a special meaning. After a hard day's work the pioneers of Israel would sit by the fire passing a finjan around. This is reflected in the popular song "HaFinjan".) is a klezmer band from Winnipeg, Canada. Described as "Canada's first klezmer band", it was formed in 1982, during a wave of "klezmer revival".

== History ==
Their first show was in February 1983 for the CBC program Identities. As of 2023, the lineup is Shayla Fink (vocals, piano), Kinsey Posen (double bass, vocals), Daniel Koulack (guitar), Daniel Roy (percussion) and the brothers Myron (clarinet) and Victor (violin) Schultz. Among the founders was also Eli Herscovitch (saxophone, horn and flute).

Their peak of activity was during late 1980s and 1990s. Later it turned out that the band work was unsustainable for them, all having day jobs and families, so they took a long hiatus, occasionally playing here and there.

== Albums ==
- 1985: Where Were You Before Prohibition Fat Uncle Records
- 1988: From Ship to Shore, cassette, vinyl LP, Fat Uncle Records,
- 1992: Crossing Selkirk Avenue, CD, Fat Uncle Records (nominated for Juno Awards of 1994)
- 2000: Dancing on Water, CD, Rounder Records (nominated for Juno Awards of 2001)
- 2001: Klezmer Suite (with Winnipeg Symphony Orchestra, commissioned to composer Sid Robinovitch), CD, CBC Records (nominated for Juno Awards of 2002, awarded a Prairie Music Award for outstanding classical recording)

== Filmography ==
- Various CBS shows, documentaries, and interviews
- The Outside Chance of Maximilian Glick They starred Saul Rubinek, Fairuza Balk and Jan Rubes
- The Saddest Music in the World (performing their arrangement of Swing Low Sweet Chariot with Mini-Mariachis)
