= Billy Joe Green =

Billy Joe Green is an Anishinaabe rock and blues musician from Canada. He is most noted as a three-time Juno Award nominee for Indigenous Music Album of the Year, receiving nominations at the Juno Awards of 2002 for My Ojibway Experience: Strength & Hope, at the Juno Awards of 2006 for Muskrat Blues and Rock & Roll and at the Juno Awards of 2009 for First Law of the Land.

Green, a member of the Lac Seul First Nation from Kejick Bay, was the son of David Green, a country musician. A survivor of the Indian residential school system, he turned to music as an outlet for healing. He launched his own musical career in the late 1960s with the band The Feathermen, although he did not record an album until Roughin' It in 1996. He has since released eight further CDs.

Green has also won two Indigenous Music Awards, and a Western Canadian Music Award.

== Discography ==
- Roughin' It (1996)
- My Ojibway Experience: Strength & Hope (2000)
- Muskrat Blues and Rock & Roll (2004)
- The Best of Billy Joe Green (2008)
- First Law of the Land (2008)
- String Twister: Billy Joe Green Hits & Misses (2010)
- Swingin' Tomahawk (2013)
- Fender Bender (2017)
- The Feathermen Family: Keeping The Circle Strong, Vol. One (2019)
