= The Gas and the Clutch =

The Gas and The Clutch

Studio album by The Perpetrators
- Released: 2005
- Recorded: 2005
- Genre: Indie rock, blues
- Label: Independent
- Producer: The Perpetrators

The Perpetrators chronology
The Perpetrators (2003)	The Gas and The Clutch (2005)	Tow Truck (2007)

Professional ratings
Review scores
Source	Rating
Winnipeg Sun	4/5 stars

The Gas and the Clutch is the second album from Canadian blues-rock group the Perpetrators. Recorded by Len Milne at Bedside Studios, the album won the Outstanding Blues Album at the 2005 Western Canadian Music Awards and was nominated for a Juno Award.

== Track listing ==
1. 55th Street Boogie
2. She Lets Me Know
3. Roller Coaster Love
4. One Year Ago
5. Sent Me Down the Road
6. Scratch the Surfish
7. Lovin' in My Baby's Eyes
8. Are You Ready for the Country
9. You Can't Sit Down
10. The Woman I Love
