= Iskwē =

Canadian singer-songwriter (born 1981)

iskwē
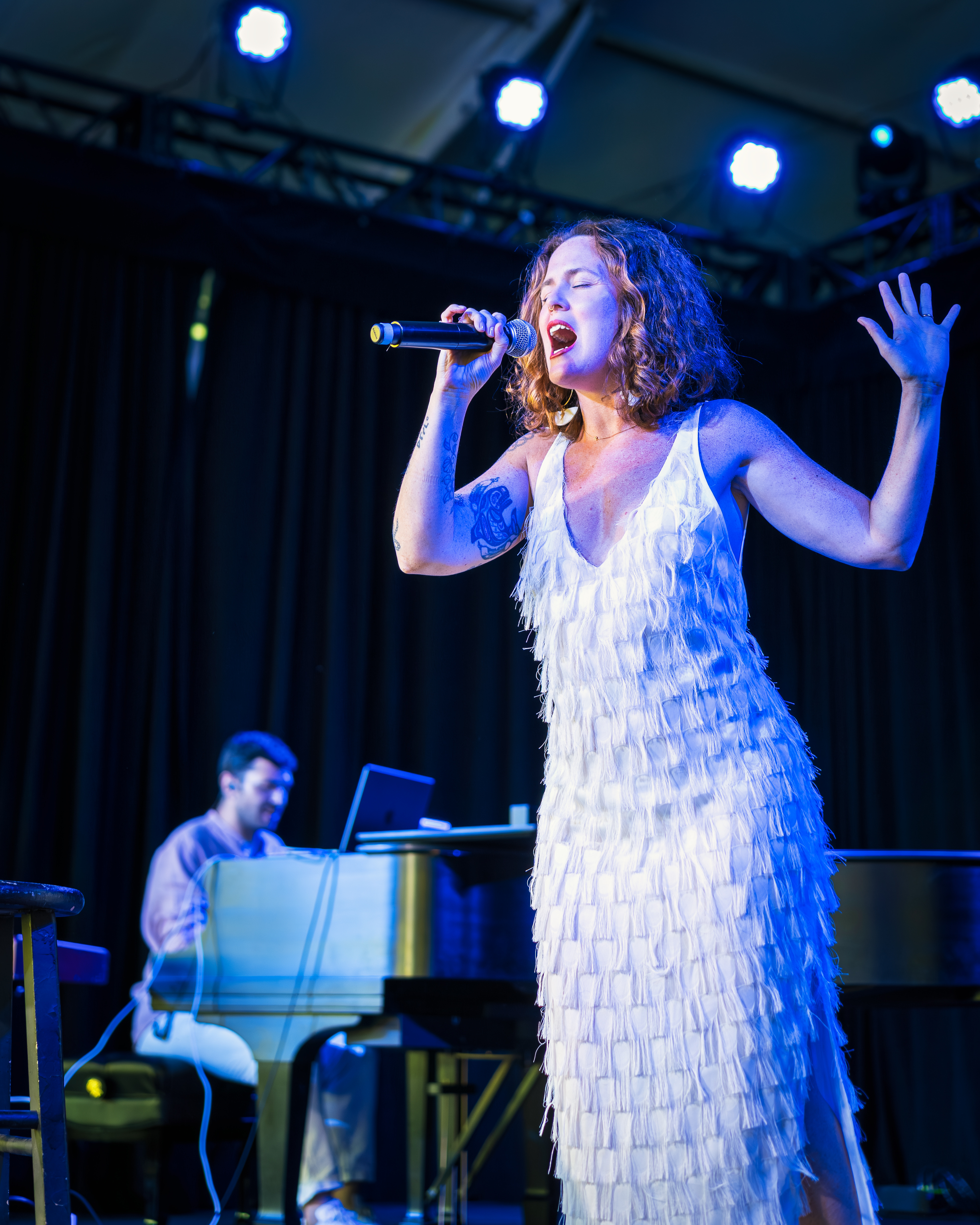
- iskwē at Ottawa Jazz Festival in 2025

Background information
- Birth name: Meghan Lynne Meisters
- Born: 1981 (age 43–44); Winnipeg, Manitoba, Canada
- Origin: Hamilton, Ontario, Canada
- Genres: Electropop; indie electronic; downtempo; trip hop; post-rock
- Occupation: singer-songwriter
- Website: iskwe.com

iskwē (Cree syllabics: ᐃᐢᑫᐧᐤ, formerly transliterated IsKwé) (short for waseskwan iskwew, meaning "blue sky woman" in English) (born Meghan Lynne Meisters, 1981) is a Canadian singer-songwriter and activist.

== Personal life ==
Originally from Winnipeg, Manitoba, iskwē has lived in Los Angeles, New York City, and Toronto, and now lives in Hamilton, Ontario.

iskwē is a Cree Métis and a citizen of the Manitoba Métis Federation, a federally recognized Métis government.

== Career ==
She released her debut album Iskwé in 2013. Her debut single "Nobody Knows," produced by The Darcys and featured in the Netflix series Between, focused on the Missing and murdered Indigenous women crisis in Canada.

Her second album, The Fight Within, was released in 2017. In 2018, she received a SOCAN Songwriting Prize nomination for the song "Healers". The Fight Within garnered a win at the 2017 Western Canadian Music Awards (WCMA) for Electronic/Dance Artist of the Year, she also received a Juno Award nomination for Indigenous Music Album of the Year at the Juno Awards of 2018 and was longlisted for the 2018 Polaris Music Prize.

Her third album, acākosīk, was released on 8 November 2019. The album won a Juno Award for Music Video of the Year for the song Little Star directed by Sarah Legault and was a Juno Award nominee for Adult Alternative Album of the Year at the Juno Awards of 2020. Her song "Breaking Down" was shortlisted for the 2020 SOCAN Songwriting Prize and the video PRISM Prize.

iskwē's fourth album The Stars was released 5 March 2021 and is a "reimagination" of her album acākosīk (saying that "the stars" is English for acākosīk.) featuring new arrangements (by Darren Fung) of six songs with iskwē accompanied by a trio of piano (Michael Shand), cello (Mariel Gonzalez), and violin (Laura C Bates) recorded live-of-the-floor at Revolution Recording in Toronto and an orchestral arrangement of “Night Danger (Lovers Mix)” recorded with the FILMharmonic Orchestra (Prague).

== Discography ==
- Iskwé (2013)
- The Fight Within (2017)
- acākosīk (2019)
- The Stars (2021)
- Mother Love (2022, with Tom Wilson)
- nīna (2024)

== Songs ==
Iskwé Album Tracks

- iNewYork
- So Over You
- Recycle ft M1 of Dead Prez
- Another Love Song (remix)
- Wandering (remix)
- One Better
- Midnight
- Another Love Song
- Not Today
- Slack Jaw

The Fight Within Album Tracks

- Ice Walker
- Soldier
- Healers
- The Storm
- Will I See
- Disturbed
- Nobody Knows
- Sometimes ft. Keolya
- Say It Sweet

acākosīk Album Tracks

- Intro
- Breaking Down
- The Unforgotten
- Little Star
- Interlude
- Sweet Tuesday
- Night Danger

The Stars Album Tracks

- Little Star (Stars Mix)
- Night Danger (Lovers Mix)
- Sweet Tuesday (Stars Mix)
- Interlude (Stars Mix)
- Breaking Down (Stars Mix)
- The Unforgotten (Stars Mix)

== Awards ==
- 2020 Juno Winner – Little Star Music Video of the Year
- 2020 Juno Nominee – acākosīk for Alternative Album of the Year
- 2020 Nominee SOCAN Songwriting Prize - for the song "Breaking Down"
- 2020 Nominee PRISM Prize for 'Breaking Down"
- 2018 Juno Nominee – The Fight Within Indigenous Album of the Year
- 2018 Polaris Prize Long List – The Fight Within
- 2017 WCMA Winner – Electronic Artist of the Year
- 2017 Winner – REVEAL Indigenous Arts Award
