= Leela Gilday =

Canadian musician

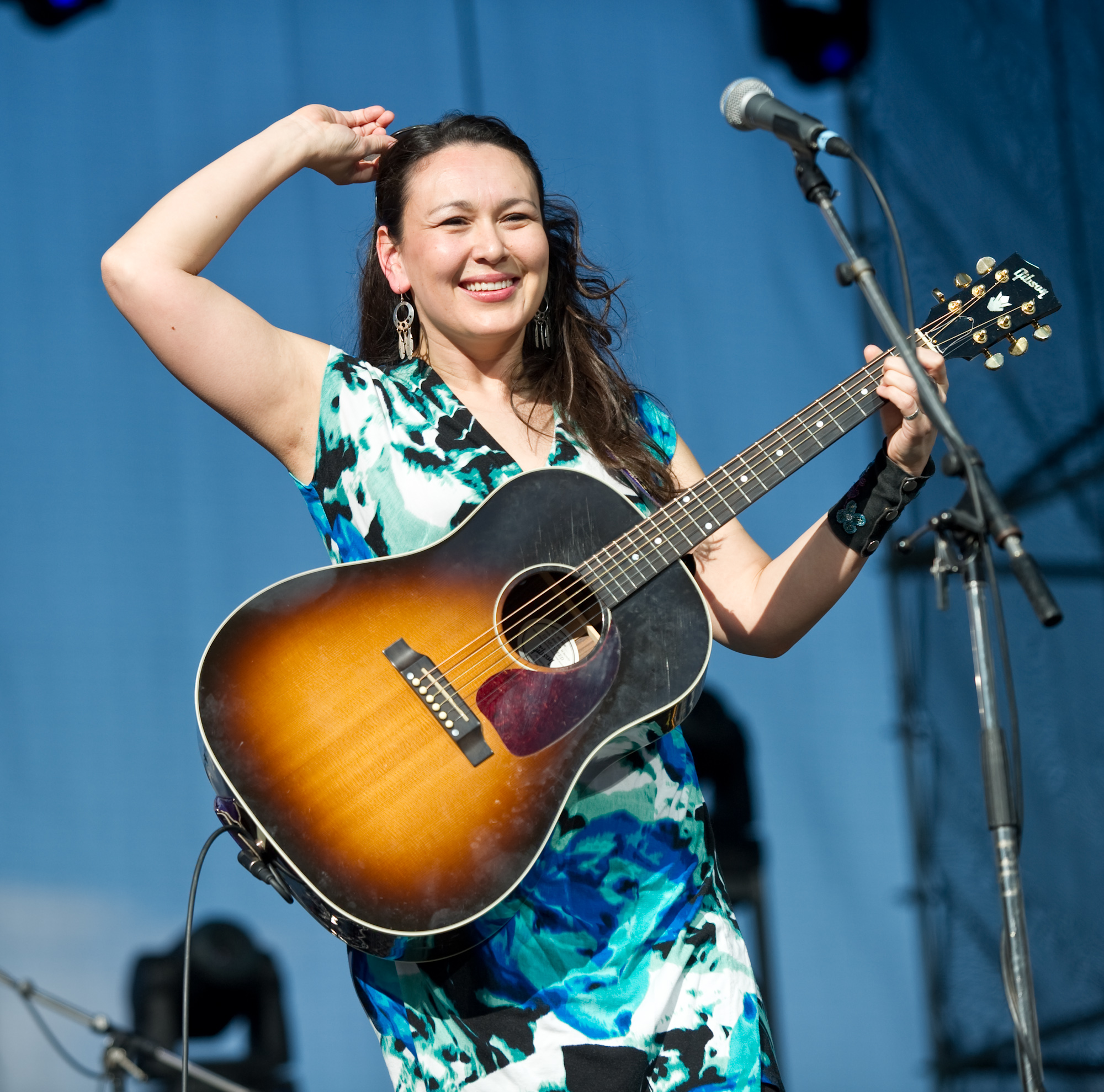
- Gilday in 2011

Background information
- Origin: Yellowknife, Northwest Territories, Canada
- Genres: Folk; pop
- Occupation: Musician
- Instruments: Guitar; vocals
- Labels: Diva Sound Records
- Website: leelagilday.com

Leela Gilday is a Canadian singer-songwriter from Yellowknife, Northwest Territories. She has released five solo albums since 2002, two of which have won the Juno Award for Indigenous Music Album of the Year.

== Early life ==
Gilday was born in Yellowknife, Northwest Territories, to an Irish Canadian father and a Dene mother. Singer-songwriter Jay Gilday is her younger brother. She graduated with a Bachelor's of Music degree from the University of Alberta in 1997.

== Career ==
In 2002, Gilday was awarded Best Female Artist, Best Folk Album, and Best Songwriter at the Canadian Indigenous Music Awards for her first release, Spirit World, Solid Wood. She was also named in Maclean's Top 50 Under 30 that same year. In 2003, she was nominated at the Juno Awards for Best Music of Aboriginal Canada.

Her second album, Sedzé, was released in 2006 and won Aboriginal Recording of the Year at the 2007 Juno Awards. Up Here named Gilday Northerner of the Year in 2007.

Her third album, Calling All Warriors, was released in 2010. It won Aboriginal Recording of the Year at the Western Canadian Music Awards. In 2011, Gilday won Aboriginal Female Entertainer of the Year at the Aboriginal People's Choice Music Awards.

Her fourth record, Heart of the People, was released in 2014 and was nominated for Aboriginal Album of the Year at the 2015 Juno Awards. Her fifth album, North Star Calling, came out in 2019. Gilday won Indigenous Songwriter of the Year at the Canadian Folk Music Awards, and the album received the Indigenous Music Album of the Year honour at the 2021 Junos.

In 2021, Gilday and her brother Jay created the musical project Sechile Sedare during the COVID-19 pandemic.

In 2023, she participated with more than 50 other artists in the recording of a charity single for Kids Help Phone's Feel Out Loud campaign. The recording combines Serena Ryder's song What I Wouldn't Do with the bridge from Gilday's "North Star Calling".

Outside of music, Gilday had a supporting role in the 2019 independent film Red Snow.

== Discography ==
- Spirit World, Solid Wood (2002)
- Sedzé (2006)
- Calling All Warriors (2010)
- Heart of the People (2014)
- North Star Calling (2019)
