= Eekwol =

Canadian rapper and activist

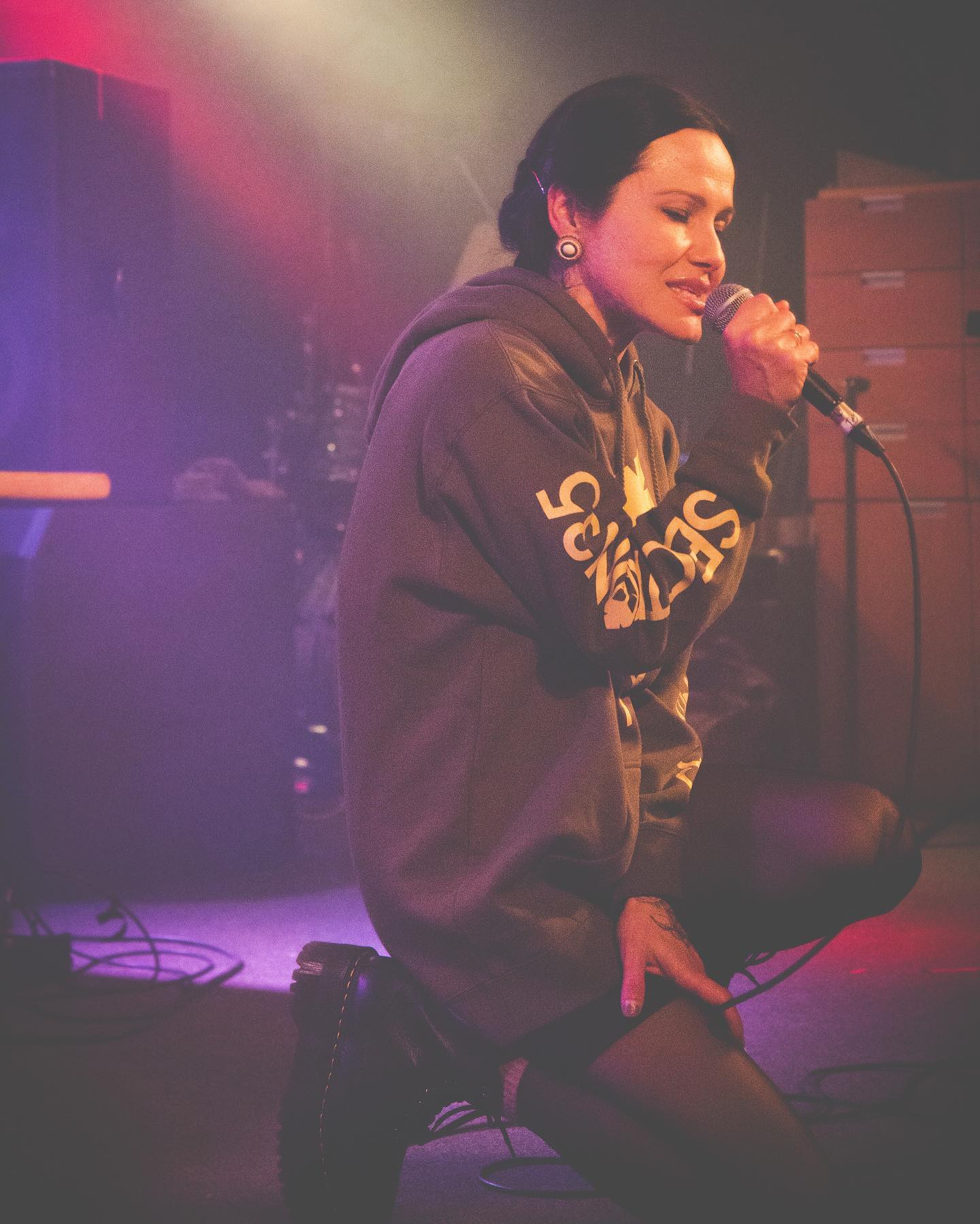

Background information
- Born: Lindsay Knight; Winnipeg, Canada
- Genres: hip hop; Rap; First Nations
- Occupations: Singer; rapper; activist
- Instrument: Vocals
- Years active: 2000-present
- Label: Independent
- Website: facebook/eekwol instagram/therealeekwol

Lindsay Knight, known by her stage name Eekwol, is a Canadian rapper and activist from the Muskoday First Nation in Saskatchewan.

She is a graduate of the University of Regina and the University of Saskatchewan (M.A.). Her master's thesis, completed through the Department of Native Studies, examines past and present Indigenous music and how both are interconnected. She later worked as a lecturer in the Native Studies department for University of Saskatchewan Native Studies department. She is currently a Ph.D. student in the Indigenous Studies Department at the University of Saskatchewan and was the university's first Indigenous storyteller-in-residence.

== Personal life ==
Eekwol was born as Lindsay Knight and has two children. She is a musician as well as an academic.

She is the niece of musician Chester Knight.

== Music career ==
Eekwol started studying hip-hop at age 16 and launched her first album in 1998. She won Best Hip Hop/Rap Album at the 2005 Canadian Aboriginal Music Awards for the Apprentice to the Mystery album, along with Mils (her brother and producer, with whom she co-owns the indie label Mils Production). The same album was nominated at the Indian Summer Music Awards in 2005, and the Aboriginal Peoples’ Choice Music Awards in 2006. Her video for "Too Sick" has been featured on the Aboriginal Peoples' Television Network, MTV Canada and Muchmusic. She served on the panel of adjudicators for the Saskatchewan Lieutenant Governor's Arts Awards in 2008.

Eekwol works as a youth mentor and has participated in songwriting workshops focused on Cree youth education in arts. She has also been an instructor for LIVE Arts Saskatchewan.

== Political activism ==
She is known for "a passionate stance on indigenous culture and struggle" in her lyrics, and for political and social activities. These activities include sitting on an Indigenous Advisory Council, and as of 7 December 2015, becoming the Program Consultant for Aboriginal Arts and Community Engagement for the Saskatchewan Arts Board.

After attending one of the events in Saskatoon regarding Truth and Reconciliation [Canada's mandated organization that acknowledges and documents residential schools where she performed, she was deeply affected after hearing the stories of residential school survivors. Her reaction was to write about it, which is reflected in her song, "Ghosts".

== Discography ==
- 1998 – Eekwol
- 1999 – Frequent Flyers of a Higher Science
- 2001 – Best Kept Secret
- 2002 – Soundsick
- 2004 – Apprentice to the Mystery
- 2007 – The List (with Mils)
- 2009 – Niso
- 2015 – Good Kill
- 2019 - F.W.B.W (with T-Rhyme)
- 2024 - TMRWS
