= Bruthers of Different Muthers =

Canadian rock band

- Origin: Winnipeg, Manitoba, Canada
- Genres: Rock, hard rock, Grunge, First Nations music
- Years active: 2008–2015
- Members: Donovan Bruyere; Jesse Green; Leroy Constant; Michel Bruyere

Bruthers of Different Muthers was a Canadian rock band from Winnipeg, Manitoba, known for blending grunge-inspired hard rock with elements of First Nations music.

The band consisted of Donovan Bruyere on lead vocals and guitar, Jesse Green on guitar, Leroy Constant on bass, and Michel Bruyere on drums.

== History ==
Bruthers of Different Mothers toured as Buffy Sainte-Marie's backing band on her 2009 tour to support Running for the Drum.

Their debut album Speakers of Tomorrow, released independently in 2011, was named best rock album at the 2011 Aboriginal Peoples Choice Music Awards, and was nominated for Aboriginal Album of the Year at the Juno Awards of 2012. The band also won two Aboriginal Peoples Choice Music Awards in 2012.

The Bruthers performed at the Muddy Water Music Festival in 2012, and again in 2015.

Michel Bruyere went on to play on Buffy Sainte-Marie's 2017 album Power In The Blood. Donovan Bruyere formed the band Rescued by Dragonflyz. Leroy Constant became Chief of Manitoba's York Factory First Nation.

== Discography ==
- Speakers of Tomorrow (2011)
