= The Fight Within (album) =

2017 studio album by Iskwē

The Fight Within is the second studio album by musical artist iskwē. It was released independently on November 3, 2017

== Reception ==
In an interview with the CBC's Andrea Gin, iskwé stated her three key influences were protecting the planet, community, and future generations. Jim Di Gioia found the album introspective and personal. He particularly cited “Will I See” as a dialogue between the singer and the multitude of missing and murdered indigenous women in Canada.Di Gioia mentions how iskwé says the song came to her immediately following a solidarity walk in Winnipeg that traveled the distance from where Tina Fontaine’s body was discovered to the monument for missing and murdered women in Winnipeg. Another review points to her Irish and Cree/Dené/Métis roots as contributing to her sound. Producers on the independently released album include The Darcys on Nobody Knows, Hayden Wolf on Soldier and Will I See; and Keolya on Sometimes and The Storm.

== Awards and recognition ==
The Fight Within was nominated for a Juno Award for Indigenous Album of the Year.

== Track listing ==
- Ice Walker (1:29)
- Soldier (4:11)
- Healers (2:53)
- The Storm (4:04)
- Will I See (4:14)
- Disturbed (3:50)
- Nobody Knows (3:11)
- Sometimes (4:13)
- Say It Sweet (4:54)
