= Finjan =

- A traditional Arabic coffee cup without handle, see Arabic coffee
- Finjan (band), Canadian Klezmer band
- The Finjan Club, Montreal, notable for the 1962 Bob Dylan bootleg recordings
- Finjan Holdings, company that focuses on the licensing of intellectual property
- Kadhim Finjan al Hammami (born 1958), Iraqi politician who was the Iraqi Minister of Transport
