= Armond Duck Chief =

Armond Duck Chief is a Canadian singer and songwriter of country music, who was a Juno Award nominee for Aboriginal Album of the Year at the Juno Awards of 2016 for his album The One.

A member of the Siksika Nation from Alberta, he released his debut album Country Groove in 2011. In addition to the Juno Award nomination, The One was a winner for Best Country Album, and Duck Chief for Best Songwriter, at the 2015 Indigenous Music Awards.
