= Swagger (Lucie Idlout album) =

Professional ratings
Review scores
Source	Rating
Waterloo Region Record	positive
Calgary Herald	4/5 stars
Vancouver Province	B+

Swagger is the second studio album by Canadian Inuk rock singer Lucie Idlout. It was released on February 19, 2009, by Sun Rev. Records.

== Awards ==
The album received a Juno Award nomination for Aboriginal Recording of the Year in 2010, but lost to Digging Roots' We Are...

The album also received six nominations at the Aboriginal Peoples Choice Music Awards and seven nominations at the Canadian Aboriginal Music Awards, and won the award for Best Rock Album at the CAMAs.

== Track listing ==
No.	Title	Length
1.	"Berlin"	3:20
2.	"Whiskey Breath"	3:57
3.	"My Shine"	2:58
4.	"Sorry"	4:06
5.	"Belly Down"	3:38
6.	"The 40 Mile"	2:17
7.	"Lovely Irene"	3:34
8.	"Tonight"	4:38
9.	"You (Devil)"	2:54
10.	"For You"	4:12
