= The Perpetrators (album) =

Studio album by The Perpetrators
- Released: 2003
- Recorded: 2003
- Genre: Indie rock, blues
- Producer: The Perpetrators

The Perpetrators chronology
The Perpetrators (2003)	The Gas and the Clutch (2005)

Professional ratings
Review scores
Source	Rating
Winnipeg Sun	4.5/5 stars

The Perpetrators is the debut album from Canadian blues-rock group the Perpetrators. The album was released in 2003.

== Track listing ==
1. "12,000 Miles"
2. "One More Day"
3. "Crappy Job"
4. "Look at You"
5. "Hollywood"
6. "1/4 to 5"
7. "Stay Strong"
8. "Toe Stub"
9. "Garmonbozia"
10. "Six-Pack"
11. "Malt Liquor"
12. "Hate Song"
13. "12,000 Vocoders"
