= Burnt Project 1 =

Canadian band

Burnt Project 1 is a Canadian First Nations band from Winnipeg, Manitoba. An eleven-member musical collective, the band incorporates elements of rock music, blues, jazz, funk and traditional First Nations music into its style. African, Middle Eastern and Latin beats are also included in their songs, as is a big band sound from the horn section.

== History and influences ==
Burnt Project 1 was formed in 2001 by Kiwizenz-Tawagun, a.k.a. David Boulanger, who includes in his influences Queens of the Stoneage, Red Hot Chili Peppers, Dave Matthews, Jimi Hendrix, and Bob Marley. In 2003, they released their first album, The Avenue, which was nominated as Best Indigenous Music Album at the Juno Awards of 2004; the band's second album, Hometown, won Aboriginal Recording of the Year at the Juno Awards of 2006.

In June 2008, the band played a special concert at the Indian Residential School Museum of Canada, which was formerly a residential school itself. The Nanaandawe'iti Nagamonan: Healing Songs concert was performed and recorded at the Long Plain First Nation Reserve, located at Portage la Prairie in Manitoba. The CBC commissioned David Boulanger to write a song dedicated to residential school survivors. His mother, Cathy Boulanger, and friend, Winnipeg's Poet Laureate Duncan Mercredi were both survivors and participated in the song's composition.

The band's third album, The Black List, was nominated as Best Aboriginal Album at the Juno Awards of 2013.

The band performed at the 2013 Indspire Awards. In May 2021, Burnt Project 1 performed in concert at Winnipeg's West End Cultural Centre; the concert was filmed by Farpoint Films and made into the film Red Road.

== Members ==
- David Boulanger (acoustic guitar, vocals)
- Anthony Giancola (drums, percussion)
- Lloyd Peterson (bass guitar, electric Guitar)
- Dale Brown (fiddle, effects unit)
- Marie-Josee Dandeneau (upright/double bass)
- Lesley Boulanger (DJ/turntables)
- Marc Baureiss (electric guitar)
- Peter Baureiss (percussion)
- David Cramer (harmonica)
- Atik Mason (bass)
- Neewa Mason (keyboards, vocals)
- Dave Schmidt (tenor saxophone)

== Discography ==
- The Avenue 1 May 2003 (Sunshine Records)

Track listing:
1. Intertribal
2. Deadmen
3. Message
4. Blue skies 1
5. Blues skies 2
6. Anyway
7. The way
8. Chiefs
9. Broken bones
10. Make sense
11. Wanna be an angel
12. Monkeys
13. Crazy girl
14. Rebel groove

- Hometown 2006 (Sunshine Records)

Track listing:
1. Tutte Insieme
2. Driving
3. Borderline
4. Lead ME Home
5. Finest Line
6. Forever
7. The Suicide
8. In Due Time
9. In Due Time II
10. World Of Living Mess
11. Prostitute
12. Devil
13. Domnedest of Stars
14. Ode To Meanies
