= Divine Brown (singer) =

Canadian singer (born 1974)

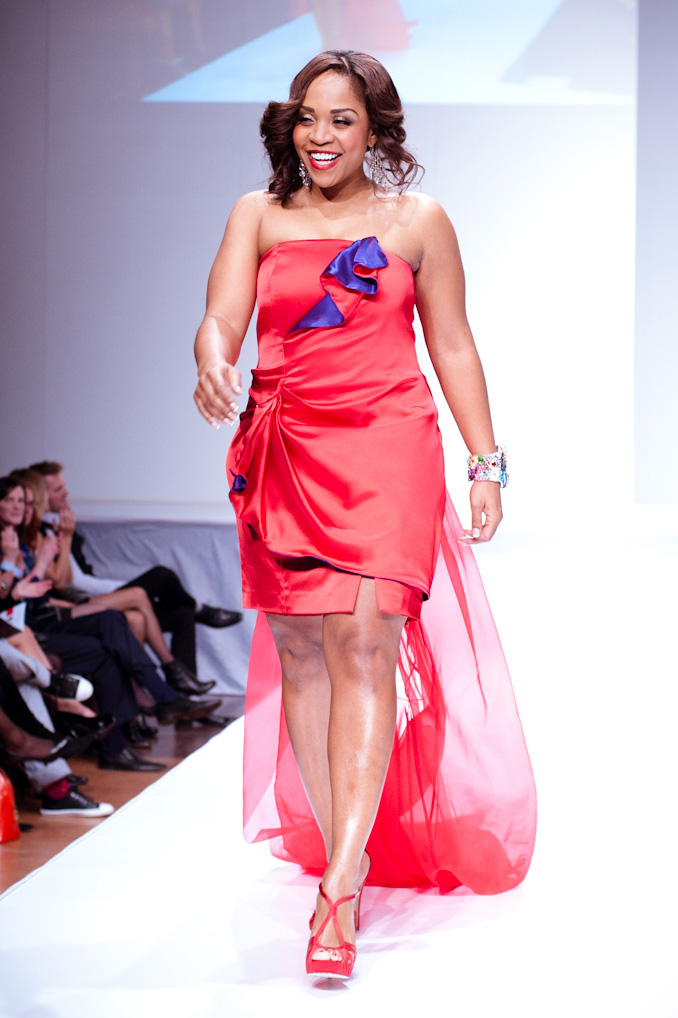
- Divine Brown at The Heart Truth Celebrity fashion show in 2012.

Background information
- Born: September 9, 1974 (age 52); Toronto, Ontario, Canada
- Origin: Toronto, Ontario, Canada
- Genres: R&B, Soul, Neo soul, Jazz
- Occupations: Singer, theatre performer
- Years active: 1997–present
- Label: Universal Music Canada
- Website: divinebrown.ca

Divine Brown (born September 9, 1974) is a Canadian R&B and soul singer and theatre performer.

== Career ==
Brown is known for her 2005 Canadian radio hit Old Skool Love.

In 2009, Divine Brown took part in an interactive documentary series called City Sonic. Earlier that year, Brown was a headliner at the "Keeping the Dream Alive Dr. Martin Luther King Jr" tribute concert.

In January 2011, Brown recorded a tribute to Dennis Brown, Sitting & Watching. Brown's third album Something Fresh was released in 2013.

In 2023, she portrayed Hélène Kuragina in the Canadian premiere of the musical Natasha, Pierre & The Great Comet of 1812.

== Discography ==
- 2005: Divine Brown
- 2008: The Love Chronicles
- 2013: Something Fresh

=== Singles ===
Year	Song	Canada	Album
2005	"Old Skool Love"	—	Divine Brown
2005	"U Shook Me (All Night Long)"	—	Divine Brown
2005	"Help Me"	—	Divine Brown
2008	"Lay It On the Line"	32	The Love Chronicles
2008	"Meet Me at the Roxy"	—	The Love Chronicles
2009	"Sunglasses" (featuring Nelly Furtado)	22	The Love Chronicles

== Awards ==
Year	Work	Award	Category	Result
2009	The Love Chronicles	Juno Award	R&B/Soul Recording of the Year	Won
