= Asani =

Asani is a surname. Notable people with the surname include:

- Ali S. Asani (born 1954), Professor of the Practice of Indo-Muslim Languages and Culture at Harvard University
- Rahim Asani, Pakistan-born American politician
- Suat Aşani (1916–1970), Turkish Olympic fencer
- Xhelil Asani (born 1995), Macedonian footballer of ethnic Albanian origin.
- Jasir Asani, (born 19 May 1995) professional Albanian national footballer, who plays at right winger.

== See also ==
- Cyclone Asani, a 2022 tropical cyclone
