= Cyclone Asani =

North Indian Ocean cyclone in 2022

Severe Cyclonic Storm Asani
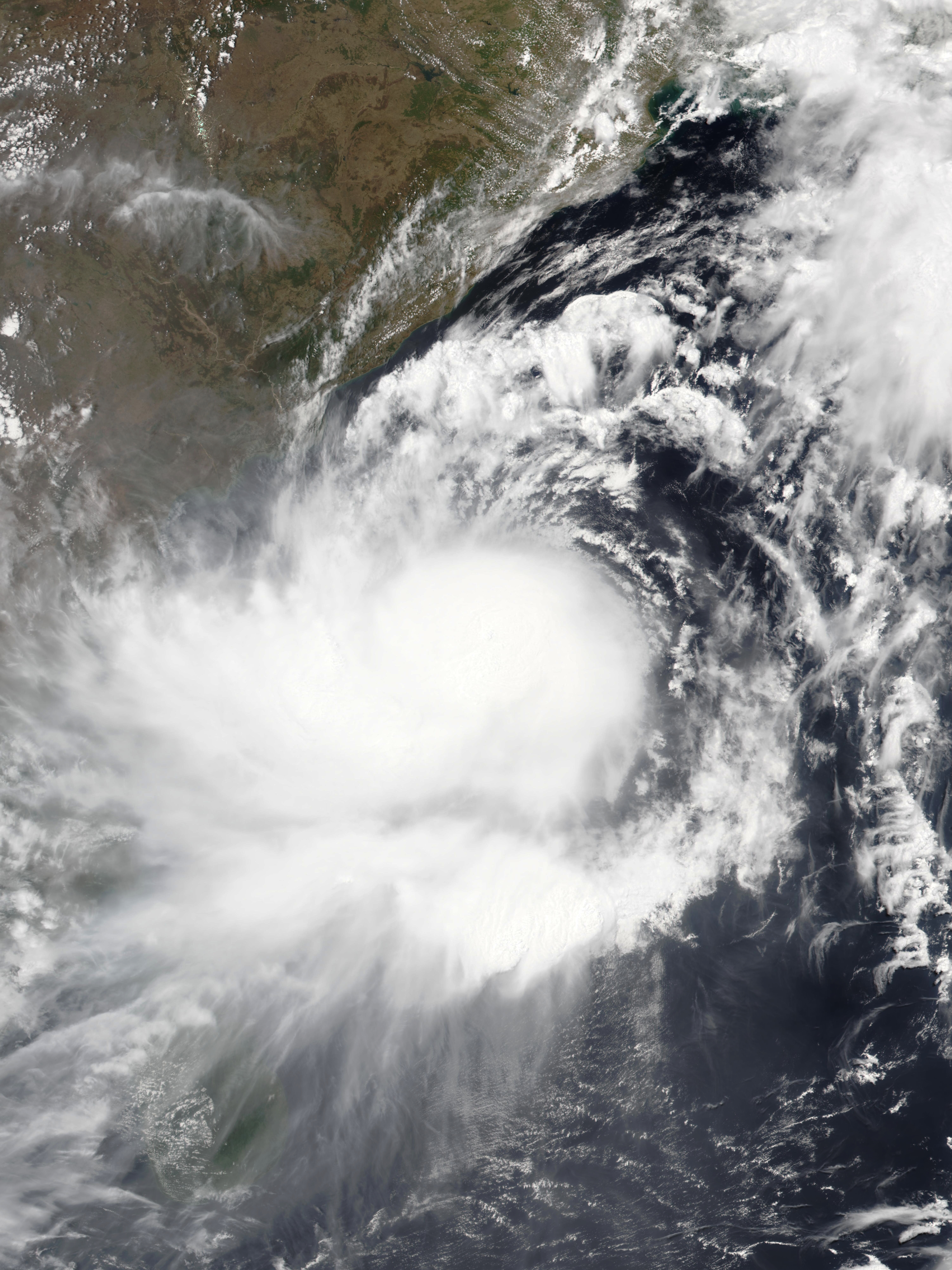
- Cyclone Asani near peak intensity on 9 May

Meteorological history
- Formed: 7 May 2022
- Dissipated: 12 May 2022

Severe cyclonic storm
- 3-minute sustained (IMD)
- Highest winds: 100 km/h (65 mph)
- Lowest pressure: 982 hPa (mbar); 29.00 inHg

Category 1-equivalent tropical cyclone
- 1-minute sustained (SSHWS/JTWC)
- Highest winds: 120 km/h (75 mph)
- Lowest pressure: 976 hPa (mbar); 28.82 inHg

Overall effects
- Fatalities: 3 total
- Damage: $323 million (2022 USD)
- Areas affected: India (Andhra Pradesh, Tamil Nadu, Karnataka, Odisha, Andaman and Nicobar Islands)
- Part of the 2022 North Indian Ocean cyclone season

Severe Cyclonic Storm Asani (Note: The name Asani (Sinhala: අසනි, [asani]) was contributed by Sri Lanka and means "thunderbolt" in Sinhala.) was a strong tropical cyclone that made landfall in India in May 2022. It was the strongest storm of 2022 North Indian Ocean cyclone season. The third depression and deep depression, and the first named storm of the 2022 North Indian Ocean cyclone season, Asani originated from a depression that the Indian Meteorological Department first monitored on 7 May. Conditions rapidly favored development as the system became a deep depression by that day before intensifying to a Cyclonic Storm Asani. On the next day it further intensified and peak to a severe cyclonic storm, before making landfall as a deep depression system over Andhra Pradesh. It degenerated into a well marked low-pressure on 12 May.

== Meteorological history ==
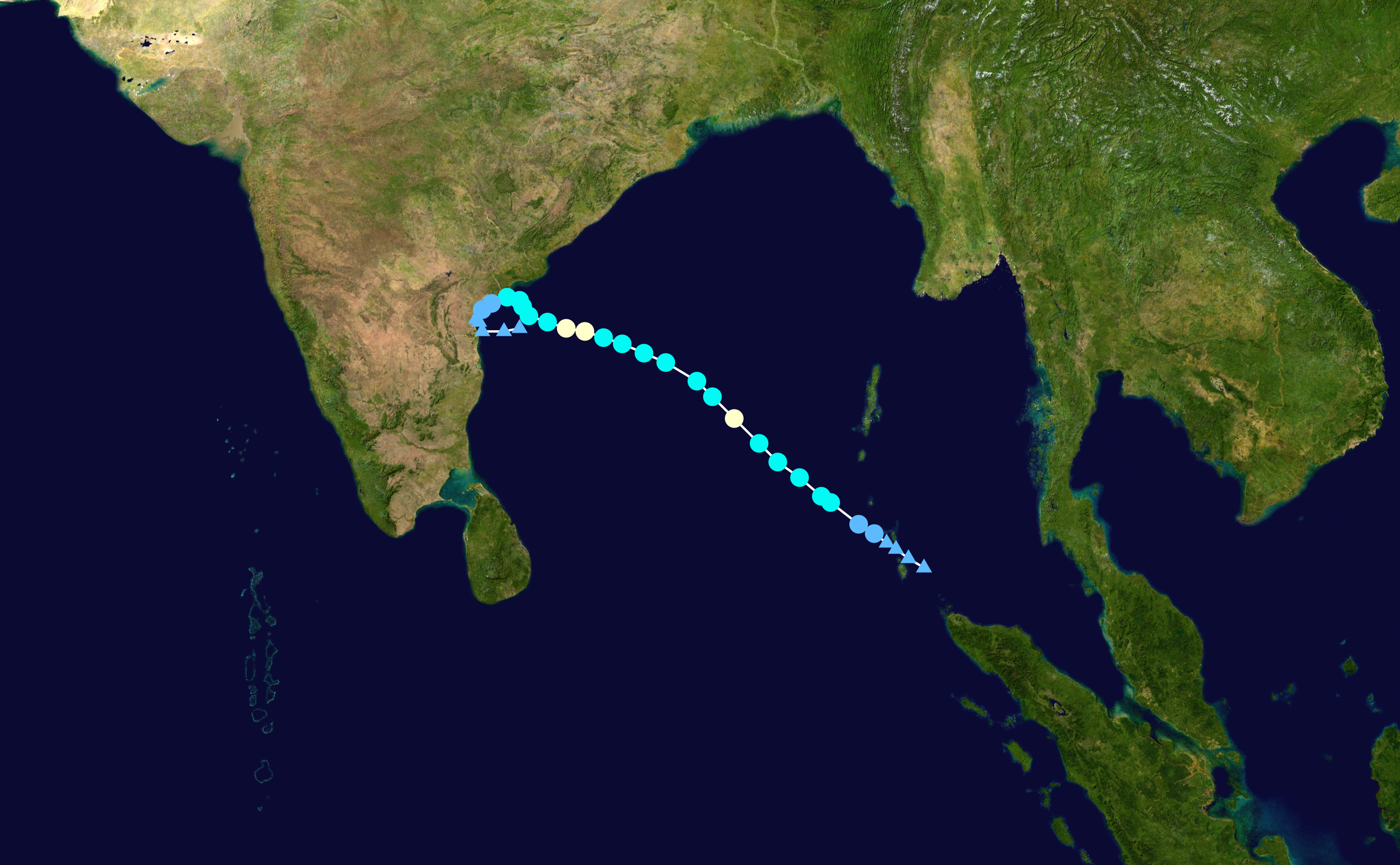
Map plotting the storm's track and intensity, according to the Saffir–Simpson scale Map key Saffir–Simpson scale Tropical depression (≤38 mph, ≤62 km/h) Tropical storm (39–73 mph, 63–118 km/h) Category 1 (74–95 mph, 119–153 km/h) Category 2 (96–110 mph, 154–177 km/h) Category 3 (111–129 mph, 178–208 km/h) Category 4 (130–156 mph, 209–251 km/h) Category 5 (≥157 mph, ≥252 km/h) Unknown Storm type Tropical cyclone Subtropical cyclone Extratropical cyclone, remnant low, tropical disturbance, or monsoon depression

During the first week of May, a strong pulse of Madden–Julian oscillation (MJO) and Equatorial Rossby wave (ERW) prevailed in this basin. These two conditions led to a formation, of a cyclonic circulation, over the southern Andaman Sea on 4 May. At the same day, a Westerly wind burst occurred which resulted in formation of twin cyclones over the Indian Ocean, the southern hemisphere counterpart being Tropical Cyclone Karim and the northern hemisphere counterpart being this cyclonic circulation. The United States Joint Typhoon Warning Center (JTWC) (Note: The Joint Typhoon Warning Center is a joint United States Navy – United States Air Force task force that issues tropical cyclone warnings for the Northern Indian Ocean and other regions.) followed the suit and designated as Invest 92B on the next day.

During 6 May, under the influence of the disturbance, a low pressure system formed off the coast of Andaman and Nicobar Islands. Subsequently, the JTWC issued its Tropical Cyclone Formation Alert (TCFA), as it had rapidly consolidated its convective structure for the past few hours, along with development a well-defined low-level centre.

Late on 7 May, the system developed into a well-marked low pressure area over the same region. At 09:00 UTC, the JTWC initiated advisories on the system and classified it as Tropical Cyclone 02B, while India Meteorological Department (IMD) (Note: The India Meteorological Department is the official Regional Specialized Meteorological Center for the Northern Indian Ocean.) simultaneously designated it as Depression BOB 03. Three hours later, the system was further upgraded to a deep depression status by the IMD as it tracked over warm sea surface temperatures of 30–31 °C (86–88 °F). By 00:00 UTC the next day, the system intensified into cyclonic storm and was assigned the named Asani, becoming the first cyclone of the season. Nine hours later, the JTWC upgraded it to a Category 1-equivalent system on the Saffir–Simpson hurricane wind scale (SSHWS). At 12:00 UTC, the IMD further upgraded it to a severe cyclonic storm, as the Microwave imaging shows well-organized system.

The cyclone began to encounter high wind shear due to which the JTWC downgraded it as a tropical storm on 10 May, while the IMD continue to maintain it as a severe cyclonic storm. it began to make a sudden westward jog and mild decrease in wind shear made the JTWC to upgrade it again into a Category 1-equivalent tropical cyclone. Nine hours later, Cyclone Asani was further downgraded into a tropical storm, it began to weaken due to higher wind shear as well as dry air intrusion. Thereafter, storm rapidly weakened into a cyclonic storm on 11 May. At 12:00 UTC it further degenerated into a deep depression as made landfall in Indian State of Andhra Pradesh. The JTWC discontinue advisories for the system, at 15:00 UTC The next day, The IMD reported that the system had weakened into a depression while moving inlands. Asani eventually degenerated into a well-marked low pressure area and IMD issued its last advisory.

== Preparations and impact ==
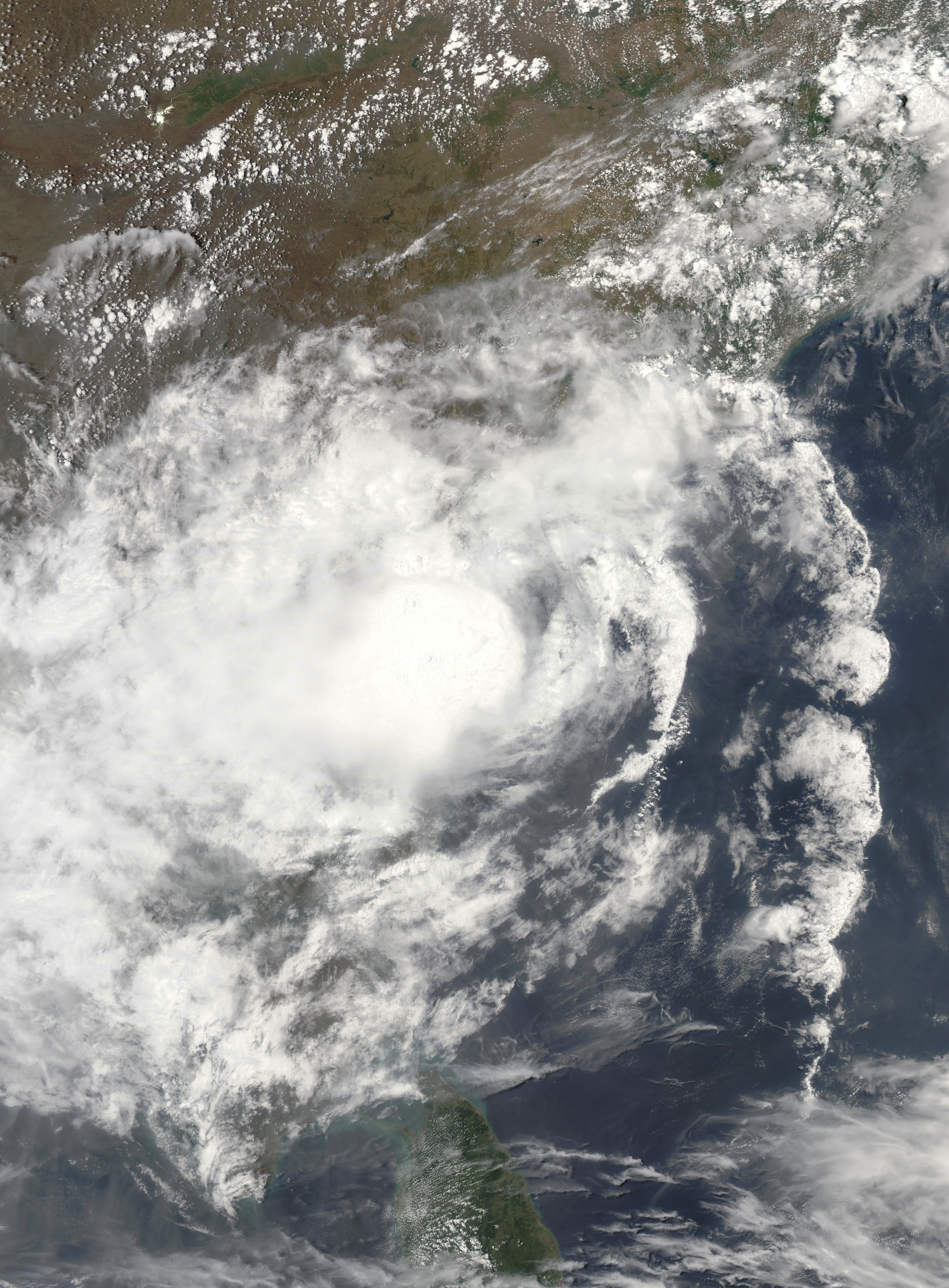
Cyclonic Storm Asani off the Andhra Pradesh coast on the afternoon of 11 May, 2022.

=== India ===
The Government of India's Union Home Secretary Ajay Kumar Bhalla had reviewed preparation for the cyclone, deployed nine teams and kept seven teams reserved in Andhra Pradesh and Odisha aided by the National Disaster Response Force (NDRF); additional teams also had been readied. The IMD issued the cyclone's warnings over Andhra Pradesh. In West Bengal, Kolkata Municipal Corporation prepared their teams to start work immediately after the damage by the cyclone.

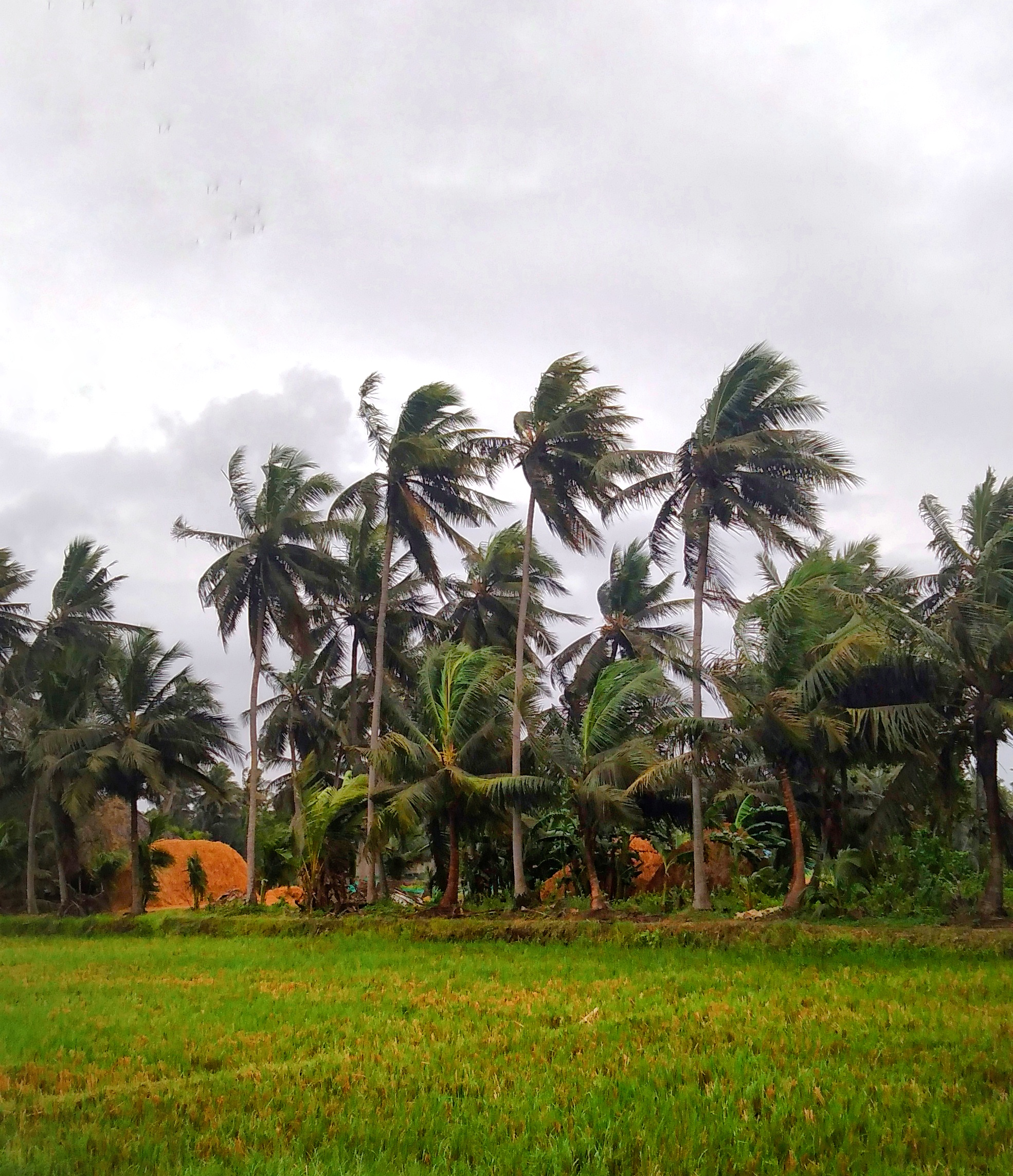
Strong wind in Konasema district due Cyclone Asani

In Visakhapatnam, Indian Navy has prepared six diving teams and 19 flood relief teams for assistance to civil authorities, along with five Indian Navy ships with relief material, and diving teams along the coast of Andhra Pradesh and Odisha. The cyclone's associated strong wind caused very heavy rain over Kerala, Andhra Pradesh, and Odisha. IndiGo cancelled 23 flights from Visakhapatnam International Airport. four Air Asia flights were also cancelled at the place for the day, 10 flights at the Chennai airport, including those from Hyderabad, Visakhapatnam, Jaipur and Mumbai, also had been canceled. About 30,225 estimate crops were affected. Damage in Andhra Pradesh was estimated to be Rs25 billion (US$323 million).

Three fatalities were confirmed from the cyclone as of 19 May. A Mandal Parishad Territorial Constituency (MPTC) from YSR Congress Party was killed after a Palmyra tree fell over him. A 43-year-old man was killed as a wall collapsed over him in the house of Kamanagaruvu village in Amalapuram. Another man was killed by a lightning strike at Jalandaki in Nellore district.

=== Bangladesh ===
4,915 cyclone shelter centres has been prepared by Barisal divisional administration in five coastal districts, two million people in livestock. District Administration of Cox's Bazar has also taken necessary measures for refugee Rohingyas in Ukhia and Teknaf camps.

== See also ==
- Weather of 2022
- Tropical cyclones in 2022
- Cyclone Lehar – a tropical cyclone that affected the Indian state of Andhra Pradesh.
- Cyclone Laila – last cyclone to hit Andhra Pradesh during the month of May.
- Cyclone Yaas – a strong tropical cyclone that made landfall in Odisha during May 2021.
- Cyclone Phailin – an intense tropical cyclone during October 2013.
- Cyclone Bijli – a weak tropical cyclone that impacted Myanmar.
- Cyclone Jawad – a tropical cyclone during December 2021
