= Divine Brown (album) =

Studio album by Divine Brown
- Released: May 31, 2005
- Genres: R&B, soul
- Length: 51:00
- Label: Blacksmith Entertainment Ltd./Universal Music Canada
- Producer: Saukrates (Big Soxx) / King James Bryan

Divine Brown chronology
Divine Brown (2005)	The Love Chronicles (2008)

Singles from Divine Brown
- 1. "Old Skool Love" Released: September 29, 2005; 2. "U Shook Me (All Night Long)" Released: 2005; 3. "Help Me" Released: 2005

Divine Brown is the self-titled debut album by Canadian R&B singer Divine Brown. The first single "Old Skool Love" was a hit on many radio stations such as CJFM.

== Critical reception ==
Professional ratings
Review scores
Source	Rating
AllMusic	3.5/5 stars

Despite the record's middle portion having "a mild creative misstep" with doo wop production that's "old-fashioned and repetitive", Matthew Chisling from AllMusic said that "Divine Brown is one of those unfortunate artists who deserve so much more credit than they actually get. Brown's self titled debut album is a gorgeous display of talent […] The music on the album is just amazing."

== Track listing ==
No.	Title	Writer(s)	Producer(s)	Length
1.	"Old Skool Love"	M. Brown, James Bryan	Bryan	3:24
2.	"Twist My Hair"	M. Brown, Noah Shebib	Divine Brown, Shebib	4:12
3.	"U Shook Me (All Night Long)"	M. Brown, Big Soxx	Big Soxx	5:38
4.	"Help Me"	Joni Mitchell	Brown, Shebib	3:11
5.	"Deja Vu"	M. Brown, Big Soxx	Big Soxx	3:44
6.	"Somethin' Bout You"	M. Brown, Big Soxx, E3	Big Soxx, E3 (co.)	3:34
7.	"My Cryin' Eyes"	M. Brown	Divine Brown	4:05
8.	"Another Affair"	M. Brown, Big Soxx, Shebib	Big Soxx	4:55
9.	"Without You"	Divine Brown	Divine Brown	6:13
10.	"Boss Playa"	M. Brown, Big Soxx, E3	Big Soxx	3:10
11.	"Single Mamma"	M. Brown, Big Soxx	Big Soxx	3:50
12.	"Longer Than I"	M. Brown	Divine Brown, Oliver Johnson	4:20
13.	"Warrior"	M. Brown	Divine Brown	4:47

• (co.) Co-producer

== Personnel ==
Adapted credits from the liner notes of Divine Brown.

- Tom Coyne: mastering (Sterling Sound, NYC)
- Chris Smith: executive producer
- Noel "Gadget" Campbell: executive producer, A&R
- Ray Hammond: A&R coordinator
- Garnet Armstrong, Susan Michalek: Art direction and design
- Michael Chambers: photography
