= Burn Me Down (album) =

Studio album by Inez Jasper
- Released: August 1, 2013
- Genre: Pop music
- Label: Lets'emot Music
- Producer: Inez Jasper

Inez Jasper chronology
Singsoulgirl (2009)	Burn Me Down (2013)

Burn Me Down is a studio album by Canadian singer-songwriter and producer-engineer Inez Jasper. Released on August 1, 2013, on her label Lets'emot, the album blends R&B, First Nations music, pop music, and EDM. The album led to Jasper's second nominations for both the WMCA Aboriginal Recording of the Year and for Juno Award for Aboriginal Album of the Year. At the 2014 Aboriginal People's Choice Music Awards, the album was named Best Pop Album and led to Jasper being named Best Producer/Engineer.

== Production and release ==
Her album Burn Me Down was released on August 1, 2013, and like her debut was published through her label Lets'emot Music. Among the tracks on the album are "The Takeover," featuring Jon C, and "Fallen Soldier" featuring Fawn Wood. Some of the ten dance songs also incorporate samples of Big Phil performing Sto:lo traditional singing.

The track "Dancin' on the Run" had been released prior to the album, in May 2013. According to Chilliwack Times, the song is about "Canadian government's notorious ban on native potlatch gatherings between 1885 and 1951." A music video for the track was released in July 2013.

== Reception ==
External videos
- "Dancin' on the Run" (Official Music Video) - May 17, 2013
- "Burn Me Down" (Official Music Video) - Sep 13, 2013

Reviews were largely positive, with a mixed response to the more pop-oriented sound of this album versus her debut. Chilliwack Times described her sound in Burn Me Down as veering "further into upbeat dance-inspired pop." Likewise, Indian Country Today wrote that in the album "Inez has married her spot-on vocals to the pop genre." The review further described the album as a "35-minute romp through buzzy electronic beats, Casio-inspired clap tracks and suggestive lyrics rife with innuendo." AMMSA wrote that "this is a far more Pop’d out version of Inez than her first soulful offering and her beautiful vocals float over strong danceable beats."

== Awards ==
In February 2014 Burn Me Down was nominated for a Juno Award for Aboriginal Album of the Year. On June 4, 2014, the Western Canadian Music Alliance announced that Inez had been nominated for Aboriginal Recording of the year at the Western Canadian Music Awards. On September 12, 2014, she performed during the live broadcast at the Aboriginal People's Choice Awards, held in Winnipeg, Manitoba. During the ceremonies she was called onstage and given two awards for her work on Burn Me Down: Best Producer-Engineer, and Best Pop Album.

== Track listing ==
All music is composed by Inez Jasper.

No.	Title	Length
1.	"Down Came the Rain"	3:47
2.	"Electric 49"	3:16
3.	"Ain't Nobody"	3:07
4.	"Burn Me Down"	3:45
5.	"You'll Never Know"	3:32
6.	"Dancin' on the Run"	3:34
7.	"The Takeover (feat. Jon C)"	3:45
8.	"Fallen Soldier (feat. Fawn Wood)"	3:34
9.	"The Way We Were"	4:00
10.	"Home"	3:11

== Awards and nominations ==
Year	Award	Nominated work	Category	Result
2014	Western Canadian Music Awards	Burn Me Down	Aboriginal Recording of the Year	Nominated
2014	Juno Awards	Burn Me Down	Aboriginal Album of the Year	Nominated
2014	Aboriginal People's; Choice Music Awards	Burn Me Down	Best Pop Album	Won
2014	Aboriginal People's; Choice Music Awards	Inez	Best Producer/Engineer	Won

== Personnel ==
- Inez Jasper - primary artist
