= The Pappy Johns Band =

- Origin: Canada
- Genres: Blues
- Years active: 1978–present
- Members: Dan Powless; Oren Doxtator; John Lee; Josh Arden Miller

The Pappy Johns Band is a Canadian blues band whose core members have been performing together for over 30 years. Don Powless (bass), Murray Porter (vocals, keyboards), and Oren Doxtator (drums), met in 1978, and played together in the Bar Road Band. Faron Johns later joined the group, and in 2003 the group added the services of singer–songwriter and guitarist, Josh Miller, for their album tour Full Circle. Joseph Michael Mahfoud recorded the studio tracks for the Full Circle CD. Joseph started the tour, but could not finish due to family obligations. The Pappy Johns Band is known to Canadian television audience for being the house band on Aboriginal Peoples Television Networks' variety program Buffalo Tracks.

== Awards ==
The Pappy Johns Band won the award for Best Group/Duo at the 2002 Canadian Aboriginal Music Awards. Band members won three additional awards: for Best Male Artist (Faron Johns); Best Song & Songwriter for Blame It On Monday (Faron Johns); and Best Producer/Engineer (Alec Fraser & Band).

In November 2004, the band won Best Blues Album at the 2004 Canadian Aboriginal Music Awards for Full Circle, and they were 2005 Juno Awards nominees for Aboriginal Recording of the Year for Full Circle.

In November 2009, The Pappy Johns Band won again for Best Blues Album at The Canadian Aboriginal Music Awards for Havin' A Good Time Now.

== Current line-up ==
Don Powless – bass guitar, is a Mohawk originally from the Six Nations Reserve, but currently resides in Fort Erie, Ontario. In addition to The Pappy Johns Band, Powless has played in blues bands that include Bar Road Band, The Roadhouse Band, and Painted Pony.

Oren Doxtator – drums, is originally from the Oneida Settlement (near London, Ontario), but he grew up in Buffalo, New York. Currently a resident of Fort Erie, Ontario, Powless and his brother-in-law Oren have formed a solid rhythm section for over 30 years.

John Lee – piano/vocals, is originally from St. Stephen, New Brunswick, Canada, but currently resides in Kitchener, Ontario, has toured and written songs with Matt Minglewood, Mel Brown & The Homewreckers, and Beverly Mahood.

Josh Arden Miller – guitar/vocals, is also a Mohawk from Six Nations. Miller plays guitar and vocals. He toured across Canada with Murray Porter while still a teenager. In addition to be a member of The Pappy Johns Band, he also fronted his own bands, The Soul Kings and Three Wheel Drive.

== Discography ==
- 1492, Who Found Who, First Nations Music, Murray Porter (solo), 1995
- Blame It On Monday Independent, 2002
- Skin Tight Blues A First Peoples Blues Compilation Sweet Grass Records/EMI Music Canada, July, 2002, tracks Blame It On Monday by Pappy Johns Band and Colours by Murray Porter
- Full Circle, Independent, November 2003
- Blues sur Seine compilation, France, July 2005, includes the song Make Your Mind Up by Murray Porter
- Toronto Blues Society 20th Anniversary compilation 2005 TBS, May 2005, includes the song Meat on the Bone by Murray Porter
