= Juno Awards of 1994 =

Canadian music awards ceremony

- Date: 20 March 1994
- Venue: O'Keefe Centre, Toronto, Ontario
- Hosted by: Roch Voisine

Television/radio coverage
- Network: CBC

The Juno Awards of 1994, representing Canadian music industry achievements of the previous year, were awarded on 20 March 1994 in Toronto at a ceremony in the O'Keefe Centre. Roch Voisine was the host for the ceremonies, which were taped that afternoon for broadcast that evening on CBC Television.

Nominations were announced 8 February 1994. Starting in 1994, the Best New Solo Artist combined the former Most Promising Male and Female Vocalist categories. Reggae also received its own category, after years of being included under banners such as "world beat" or mixed with calypso.

A new category for aboriginal music was also introduced and was awarded by Robbie Robertson. The award faced controversy after nominee Sazacha Red Sky was accused of cultural appropriation by Leonard George son of Chief Dan George, the alleged writer of the song that has since been registered as Public Domain, because she was not personally a member of the Tsleil-Waututh First Nation and according to Leonard George did not have the right to record it under their cultural traditions. His son Leonard George sought a legal injunction to prevent the award from being presented at the Juno Awards ceremony at all, and a final compromise revising Red Sky's nomination to reflect the album instead of the song was announced on the morning of the ceremony.

Around the time of the 1994 ceremonies, there were plans to host the 1995 ceremonies in Winnipeg. However, Juno organisers CARAS was demanding substantial funding from the Winnipeg committee attempting to host the awards.

Atlantic group The Rankin Family was the major winner in 1994, winning awards in four categories including Entertainer of the Year.

== Nominees and winners ==
=== Canadian Entertainer of the Year ===
This award was chosen by a national poll rather than by Juno organisers CARAS.

Winner: The Rankin Family

Other Nominees:

- Barenaked Ladies
- Celine Dion
- The Tragically Hip
- Michelle Wright

=== Best Female Vocalist ===
Winner: Celine Dion

Other Nominees:

- Rita MacNeil
- Sarah McLachlan
- Anne Murray
- Alannah Myles

=== Best Male Vocalist ===
Winner: Roch Voisine

Other Nominees:

- Stef Carse
- Daniel Lanois
- John McDermott
- Snow

=== Best New Solo Artist ===
Winner: Jann Arden

Other Nominees:

- Meryn Cadell
- Charlie Major
- Mario Pelchat
- Jim Witter

=== Group of the Year ===
Winner: The Rankin Family

Other Nominees:

- Blue Rodeo
- The Jeff Healey Band
- Moxy Früvous
- Rush

=== Best New Group ===
Winner: The Waltons

Other Nominees:

- Junkhouse
- The Odds
- Sloan
- The Tea Party

=== Songwriter of the Year ===
Winner: Leonard Cohen

Other Nominees:

- Jann Arden
- Jim Cuddy and Greg Keelor
- Sarah McLachlan
- Jane Siberry

=== Best Country Female Vocalist ===
Winner: Cassandra Vasik

Other Nominees:

- Joan Kennedy
- Anne Murray
- Anita Perras
- Shania Twain

=== Best Country Male Vocalist ===
Winner: Charlie Major

Other Nominees:

- Joel Feeney
- George Fox
- Ron Hynes
- Jim Witter

=== Best Country Group or Duo ===
Winner: The Rankin Family

Other Nominees:

- The Blue Shadows
- Cassandra Vasik and Russell deCarle
- One Horse Blue
- The Johner Brothers

=== Best Instrumental Artist ===
Winner: Ofra Harnoy

Other Nominees:

- John Arpin
- André Gagnon
- Jacques de Koninck
- Shadowy Men on a Shadowy Planet

=== Best Producer ===
Winner: Steven MacKinnon and Marc Jordan, "Waiting for a Miracle" from Reckless Valentine by Marc Jordan

Other Nominees:

- k.d. lang and Ben Mink, "Just Keep Me Moving" by k.d. lang (from Even Cowgirls Get the Blues soundtrack)
- Daniel Lanois, "The Messenger" and "Mon beau petit choux" from For the Beauty of Wynona by Daniel Lanois
- Geddy Lee, Alex Lifeson and Neil Peart with co-producer Peter Collins, "Nobody's Hero" and "Alien Shore" from Counterparts by Rush
- Jane Siberry, "Temple" from When I Was a Boy by Jane Siberry

=== Best Recording Engineer ===
Winner: Kevin Doyle, "Old Cape Cod" and "Cry Me a River" by Anne Murray

Other Nominees:

- Marc Ramaer, "Just Keep Me Moving", "Even Cowgirls Get the Blues" by k.d. lang
- Andy Hermant, "Life on the Inside Track", "Sweet Airs That Give Delight", "When Daisies Pied", "Sweet Airs That Give Delight" by Stratford Orchestra
- Stephen Traub, "Window of Opportunity" from Bombazine by Meryn Cadell
- Michael Phillip Wojewoda, "Beginning of Time" and "Calling All Angels" by Jane Siberry

=== Canadian Music Hall of Fame ===
Winner: Rush

=== Walt Grealis Special Achievement Award ===
Winner: John V. Mills

== Nominated and winning albums ==
=== Best Album ===
Winner: Harvest Moon, Neil Young

Other Nominees:

- The Future, Leonard Cohen
- I'll Always Be There, Roch Voisine
- Rocking Horse, Alannah Myles
- 12 Inches of Snow, Snow

=== Best Children's Album ===
Winner: Tchaikovsky Discovers America, Susan Hammond, Classical Kids

Other Nominees:

- Candles, Snow and Mistletoe, Sharon, Lois and Bram
- The Child's Play Connection, Barbara Nichol and others
- Dream Catcher, Jack Grunsky
- Can't Sit Down, Eric Nagler

=== Best Classical Album (Solo or Chamber Ensemble) ===
Winner: Beethoven: Piano Sonatas, Opus 10, No 1-3, Louis Lortie

Other Nominees:

- Mozart: Two-Piano Sonata, Louis Lortie and Helene Mercier
- Romantic Works for Guitar, Norbert Kraft
- Schmelzer: Sonatas, Tafelmusik, director Jeanne Lamon
- Simphonies des noels: A Treasury of Baroque Christmas Concerti, Les Violins du Roy, directory Bernard Labadie

=== Best Classical Album (Large Ensemble) ===
Winner: Handel: Concerti Grossi, Op.3 No. 1-6, Tafelmusik, director Jeanne Lamon

Other Nominees:

- Barok: The Miraculous Mandarin, Montreal Symphony Orchestra
- Gluck: Ballet Pantomimes, Tafelmusik
- Rachmaninoff: Piano Concerto No. 4, Arthur Ozolins, Toronto Symphony Orchestra
- Stravinsky, Szymanowski: Violin Concertos, Chantal Juillet and Montreal Symphony Orchestra

=== Best Classical Album (Vocal or Choral Performance) ===
Winner: Debussy Songs, soprano Claudette Leblanc, piano Valerie Tryon

Other Nominees:

- Elektra Women's Choir, Elektra Women's Choir
- Full Well She Sang, The Toronto Consort
- Schubert: Lieder, soprano Edith Wiens, piano Rudolf Jansen, clarinet Joaquin Valdepenas
- Venetian Vespers of 1640, Vancouver Cantata Singers, director James Fankhauser

=== Best Album Design ===
Winner: Marty Dolan, Faithlift by Spirit of the West

Other Nominees:

- Kenny Baird, 5 Days in July by Blue Rodeo
- Patrick Duffy and Steve Cole, Splendor Solis by The Tea Party
- David Houghton - Pale Sun, Crescent Moon by Cowboy Junkies
- Kevin Mutch, God Shuffled His Feet by Crash Test Dummies

=== Best Selling Album (Foreign or Domestic) ===
Winner: The Bodyguard, Whitney Houston

Other Nominees:

- Bat Out of Hell II: Back into Hell, Meat Loaf
- Fully Completely, The Tragically Hip
- Get a Grip, Aerosmith
- Keep the Faith, Bon Jovi

=== Best Mainstream Jazz Album ===
Winner: Fables and Dreams, Dave Young/Phil Dwyer Quartet

Other Nominees:

- Just BB, Oliver Jones
- Our 25th Year, Rob McConnell and the Boss Brass
- Standard Idioms, Sonny Greenwich
- Wheel Within a Wheel, Bernie Senensky

=== Best Blues/Gospel Album ===
Winner: South at Eight/North at Nine, Colin Linden

Other Nominees:

- Bluesology, Whiteley Brothers
- Colin James and the Little Big Band, Colin James
- Terra Firma Boogie, Triple Threat
- You Can't Have Everything, Dutch Mason

=== Best Contemporary Jazz Album ===
Winner: Don't Smoke in Bed, Holly Cole Trio

Other Nominees:

- Face the Music, Garbo's Hat
- Michael Farquharson, Michael Farquharson
- Notorious, Five After Four, with Vito Razza
- The Standard Line, David Mott

=== Best Selling Francophone Album ===
Winner: Album de Peuple Tome 2, Francois Perusse

Other Nominees:

- Ca Va Bien, Kathleen Sergerie
- Corridors, Laurence Jalbert
- Europe Tour, Roch Voisine
- Pelchat, Mario Pelchat

=== Hard Rock Album of the Year ===
Winner: Dig, I Mother Earth

Other Nominees:

- Counterparts, Rush
- Crush, Doughboys
- Givin Blood, Wild T and the Spirit
- Splendor Solis, The Tea Party

=== Best Roots & Traditional Album ===
Winner: My Skies, James Keelaghan

Other Nominees:

- At a High Window, Garnet Rogers
- Christmas, Bruce Cockburn
- Home in Halifax, Stan Rogers
- Jigzup, Oliver Schroer

== Nominated and winning releases ==
=== Single of the Year ===
Winner: "Fare Thee Well Love", The Rankin Family

Other Nominees:

- "Courage", The Tragically Hip
- "Harvest Moon", Neil Young
- "He Would Be Sixteen", Michelle Wright
- "Love Can Move Mountains", Celine Dion

=== Best Classical Composition ===
Winner: "Among Friends", Chan Ka Nin

Other Nominees:

- "Divertimento for Harp and Strings", Milton Barnes
- "Piano Concerto", Malcolm Forsyth
- "Sleight of Hand", Jean Piché
- "Three Poems", Peter Tiefenbach

=== Best Rap Recording ===
Winner: "One Track Mind", TBTBT

Other Nominees:

- "Got to Get Over", B-Kool
- "Call the Cops", Devon
- "Safe", Rumble
- "Try and Stop Us", Split Personality

=== Best R&B/Soul Recording ===
Winner: "The Time Is Right (I'll Be There for You)", Rupert Gayle

Other Nominees:

- "All I Need", George St. Kitts
- "And the Song Goes", Carol Medina
- "Love Me Right", MCJ and Cool G
- "Mothers of Hope", John James

=== Best Music of Aboriginal Canada Recording ===
Winner: Wapistan Is Lawrence Martin, Wapistan

Other Nominees:

- "Booglatamooti (The Indian Song)", J. Hubert Francis and Eagle Feather
- "Grandfather", J. Hubert Francis and Eagle Feather
- "Stoney Park", Stoney Park Singers
- "The Prayer Song" (revised to Red Sky Rising), Sazacha Red Sky

=== Best Reggae Recording ===
Winner: "Informer", Snow

Other Nominees:

- "Child Support", Inspector Lenny
- "Love and Affection", Tanya Mullings
- "Save the Children", Leejahn
- "Secret Admirer", D.J. Ray

=== Best Global Recording ===
Winner: "El Camino Real", Ancient Cultures

Other Nominees:

- "Agada: Tales from Our Ancestors", Flying Bulgar Klezmer Band
- "Condor Meets the Eagle", Kanatan Aski with Pura Fé
- "Crossing Selkirk Avenue", Finjan
- "Enat", Mother Tongue

=== Best Dance Recording ===
Winner: "Thankful (Raw Club Mix)", Red Light

Other Nominees:

- "Don't Make Me Wait", Oval Emotion
- "I'm in Love with You", BKS
- "R U Sexin' Me", West End Girls
- "Won't Give Up My Music", Lisa Lougheed

=== Best Video ===
Winner: Jeth Weinrich, Jann Arden, "I Would Die For You"

Other Nominees:

- Don Allan, "Rain Down on Me" by Blue Rodeo
- Dale Heslip, "Mmm Mmm Mmm Mmm" by Crash Test Dummies
- Curtis Wehrfritz, "The Future" by Leonard Cohen
- Curtis Wehrfritz, "I Can See Clearly Now" by Holly Cole Trio
