= Divine Brown =

American television personality and former sex worker (born 1969/1970)

- Born: 1969 or 1970 (age 55–56)
- Other name: Estella Marie Thompson
- Occupation: Former sex worker
- Known for: Arrest with actor Hugh Grant
- Partner: Alvin C. Brown
- Children: 2

Estella Marie Thompson (born 1969 or 1970), known professionally as Divine Brown, is an American former sex worker. She was the subject of a media frenzy in 1995 after being arrested alongside English actor Hugh Grant for publicly engaging in fellatio in Grant's car just off Sunset Boulevard in Los Angeles. Brown later made a series of media appearances, including interviews, commercials, guest appearances on talk shows, and posing for photographs in soft-porn magazines such as Penthouse.

== Early life ==
Brown grew up in poverty in Oakland, California, one of six children of a single mother. Having herself become a mother of two daughters, she turned to sex work when she could not pay a $133 electricity bill. On her first job in Union Square, San Francisco, she earned £500 (US$685) in five hours.

== Legal issues ==
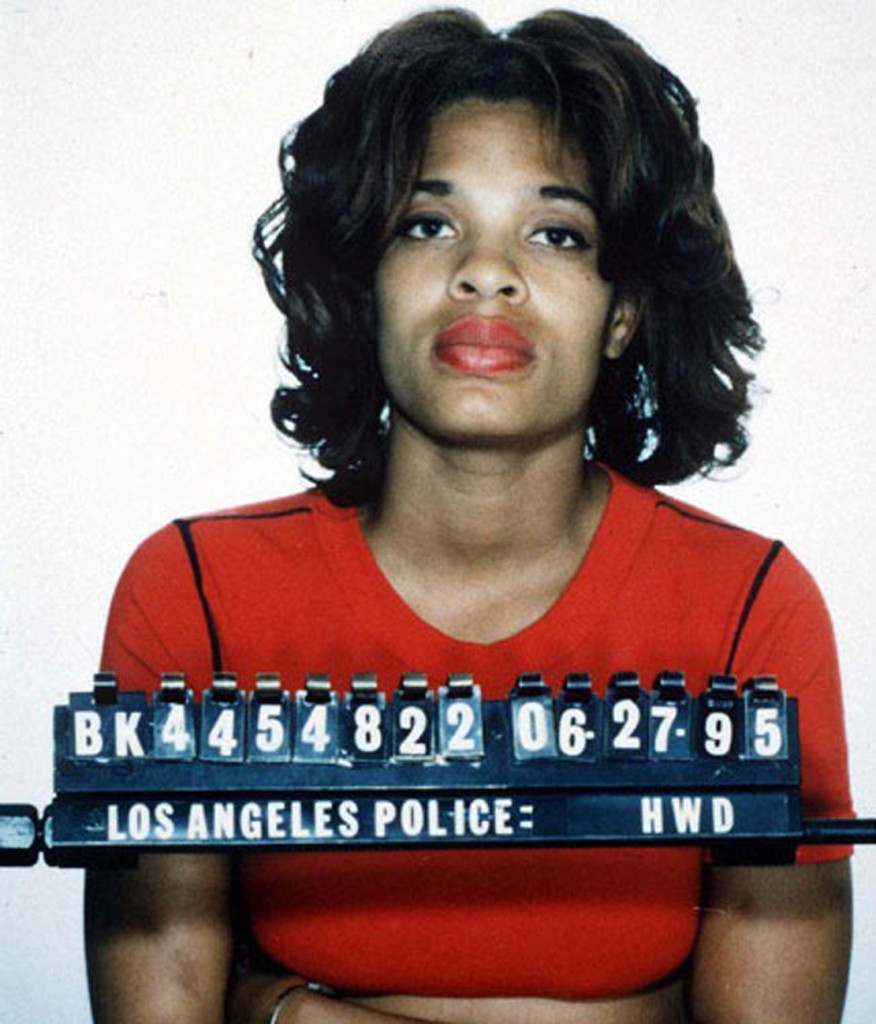
Brown's 1995 police booking photograph

In the early morning of June 27, 1995, Brown and British actor Hugh Grant were arrested together in Grant's rented automobile in a residential neighborhood near Sunset Boulevard in Los Angeles. According to Brown, police were alerted by Grant repeatedly pressing the brake pedal of his car, causing the rear lights to flash.

Charged with lewd conduct in public, Brown pleaded no contest on September 6, 1995. She was sentenced to 180 days in jail for parole violations relating to previous prostitution charges, as well as a fine and court costs totaling US$1,350. Grant pleaded no contest and was fined US$1,180 and ordered to complete an AIDS education program.

In September 1996, Brown was arrested at the MGM Grand Las Vegas in Paradise after flirting and making suggestive comments to undercover police officers. The arrest resulted in a US$950 fine for loitering for the purpose of prostitution and resisting arrest. Brown denied still being involved in sex work.

== Media attention and later life ==
Brown only learned who her client had been when reporters besieged her house the day after her arrest. News of the World reportedly paid Brown US$100,000 for her story. The incident led to a media frenzy and global media coverage. Brown appeared on television shows, including The Howard Stern Show and Danny Bonaduce's short-lived Danny!, as well as commercials for a Brazilian lingerie company and a Los Angeles radio station, and in semi-nude pictures for soft-porn magazines such as Penthouse. Before serving her prison sentence, Brown traveled to the United Kingdom to promote the adult-oriented Fantasy Channel.

Brown remained in the public eye, appearing in Joey Buttafuoco's public-access television show in 1998, on Judge Judy in 1996, and on the Danish documentary series Negermagasinet in 2005. She was the subject of the biopic Million Dollar Hooker in 2006 and appeared on Hollywood Lives, an ITV television series, in 2007.

Brown has said she earned more than £1 million (US$1.4 million) from media interviews and television guest appearances following the incident with Grant. She and her manager and partner, Alvin C. Brown, who is also the father of her children, bought a four-bedroom home in Beverly Hills. Brown has said the money she earned related to the incident has allowed her to put her daughters through private school. Interviewed on the British TV network ITV1 in 2007, she said the publicity surrounding the arrest "helped me turn it into something positive [...] I was blessed that it could get me out of that lifestyle." She later moved to Atlanta, Georgia, where she said in 2010 that she was running a music production company with her partner.
