= Derek Miller (Canadian musician) =

- Miller in 2007

Background information
- Born: 1974 (age 51–52); Six Nations, Ontario, Canada
- Genres: Blues
- Occupations: Guitarist singer-songwriter
- Instrument: Guitar
- Years active: 2002–present
- Labels: Arbor Records; Curve Music
- Website: derekmiller.ca

Derek Miller (born 29 October 1974) is an Aboriginal Canadian singer-songwriter. He has received two Juno Awards. He performed at the Closing Ceremonies of the Vancouver 2010 Winter Olympics with Eva Avila and Nikki Yanofsky.

== History ==
Miller was born in the community of the Six Nations of the Grand River First Nation, Ontario, Canada. Miller became interested in music in his teens and by the late 1990s began touring with Buffy Sainte-Marie.

In 2002, Miller released his debut album Music is the Medicine on Winnipeg's Arbor Records. He received a 2003 Juno Award in the category Aboriginal Recording of the Year for "Lovesick Blues" from his album Music is the Medicine.

In 2006, Miller released his second album The Dirty Looks. Miller was honoured with a 2007 Canadian Aboriginal Music Award, in the category Best Rock Album, for his The Dirty Looks album. The album went on to win Miller a 2008 Juno in the category Aboriginal Recording of the Year.

He performed at the closing ceremonies of the 2010 Winter Olympics with Eva Avila and Nikki Yanofsky.

In 2010, Miller released his third album Derek Miller with Double Trouble.

Miller has also appeared in supporting acting roles in film and television, including the films Moccasin Flats: Redemption, Fire Song and Point Traverse, and the television series Hard Rock Medical and Resident Alien.

In 2015, he compiled an album titled "Rumble: A Tribute to Native Music Icons". Since 2015, he has also been the host of Guilt Free Zone, a variety and sketch comedy series on the Aboriginal Peoples Television Network.

== Discography ==
=== Studio albums ===
- Music is the Medicine (2002)
- The Dirty Looks (2006)
- Derek Miller with Double Trouble (2010)
- Rumble (2015)

'Blues Vol. 1'

=== Compilations ===
- Derek Miller Live (DVD) (2008)

== See also ==
- Music of Canada
- Canadian rock
- List of Canadian musicians
