= Lucie Idlout =

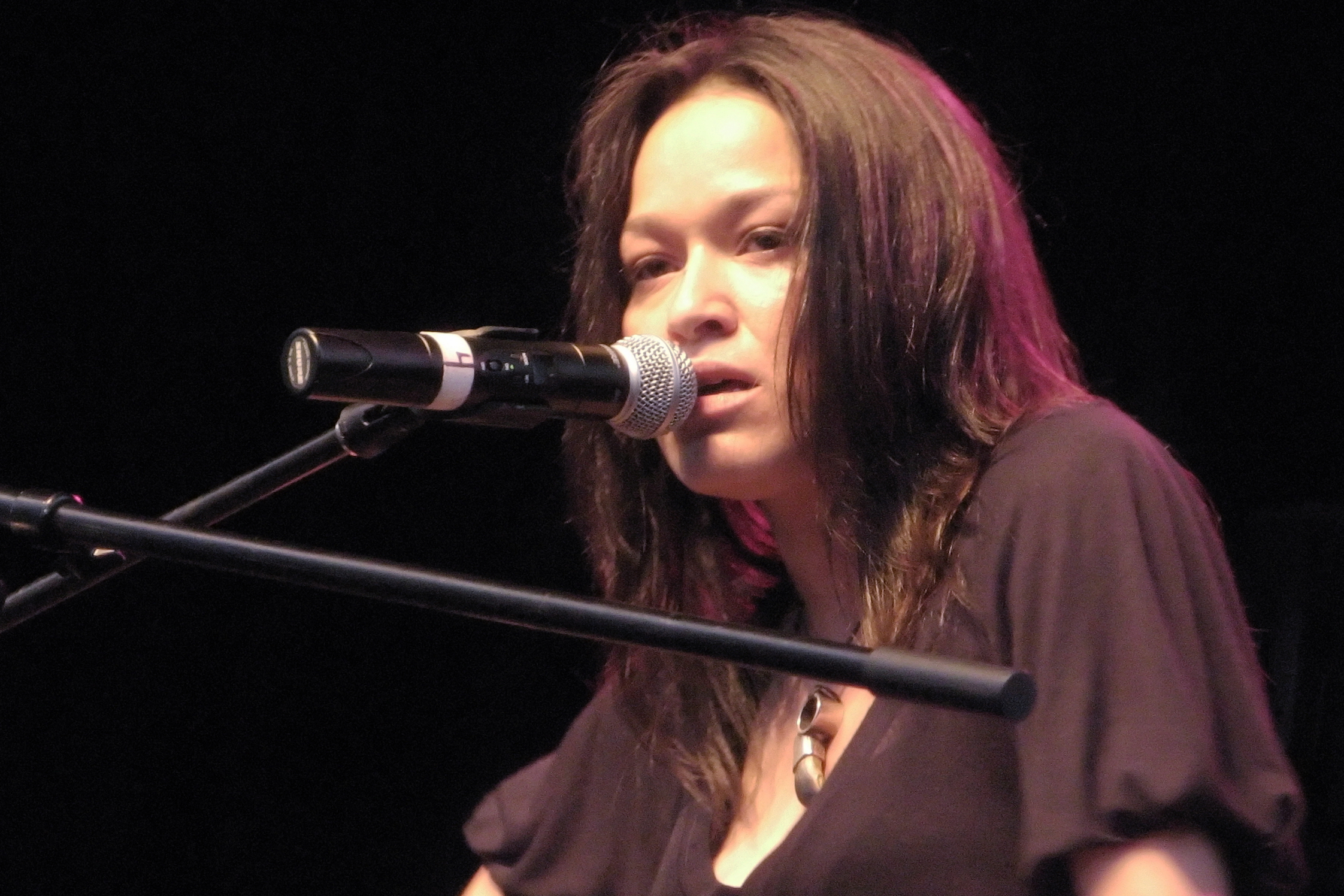
- Idlout performing at Westfest in 2008

Background information
- Born: Tatanniq Lucie d'Argencourt; 1972 or 1973 (age 52–53)
- Genres: Rock music
- Occupation: Musician
- Instruments: Vocals, rhythm guitar
- Years active: 20
- Label: Sun Rev Records

Lucie Idlout (born Tatanniq Lucie d'Argencourt, 1972/1973) is a Canadian Inuk singer-songwriter and actress from Iqaluit, Nunavut. She is the daughter of Leah Idlout-Paulson and granddaughter of Joseph Idlout.

After the release of several EPs, Idlout's first full-length album, E5-770, My Mother’s Name, hit the streets in 2004. The title, a homage to her mother, was directed at the Canadian government's dark history of identifying Inuit by disc numbers instead of their names. E5-770 was the disc number issued to her mother. The government policy was instituted in 1944 but ran from 1941 - 1978. Her song "Birthday", off of the same album, appeared in Dan Birman's Crime Spree, starring Gérard Depardieu and Harvey Keitel. Though she had already garnered national and international attention, it was when she opened for The White Stripes at their concert in her hometown of Iqaluit on June 27, 2007, that the media began to truly take notice.

Her second album, Swagger, was released in February 2009. The album includes "Lovely Irene", which was later reworked with a children's choir from Iqaluit and renamed "Angel Street". The song inspired Iqaluit Mayor Elisapee Sheutiapik to launch a campaign to call attention to the issue of domestic violence in Canada by asking Canadian cities to name a city street Angel. As of 2014, cities that have named Angel Streets as part of the campaign included Iqaluit, St. John's, Edmonton, Regina, Fredericton, Yellowknife and Kamloops.

In fall 2009, she recorded a new song, "Road to Nowhere", for the Great Canadian Song Quest on CBC Radio 2. She has since written the score for renowned filmmaker Zacharias Kunuk's film Inuit Knowledge and Climate Change, as well as music for several television shows. In 2012, Idlout guest starred as a lesbian throat singer in CBC's Arctic Air.

Filmmaker Shane Belcourt also cited Idlout, a close friend of his sister Christi, as an influence on the themes of his 2007 film Tkaronto.

In 2017, she appeared in Alan Zweig's documentary film There Is a House Here.

Idlout ran as a candidate in the 2025 Nunavut general election for the riding of Iqaluit-Niaqunnguu.

== Discography ==
- E5-770, My Mother’s Name (2004)
- Swagger (2009)
