= The Perpetrators =

Canadian blues rock band

- Origin: Winnipeg, Manitoba, Canada
- Genres: Indie rock; blues
- Years active: 1999–present
- Members: Jason Nowicki; Ken McMahon; Ryan Menard
- Website: theperps.ca

The Perpetrators are a Canadian rock/blues band formed in 1999 in Winnipeg, Manitoba, Canada. The band was nominated for a 2006 Juno Award in the Blues Album of the Year category for The Gas and the Clutch.

== History ==
Currently they are J "Howik" Nowicki (guitar, vocals), Ken "KMac" McMahon (drums, vocals), and John "Josco" Scoles (bass, vocals). Their best known songs include "Six Pack" and "She Lets Me Know". Past members include Ryan Menard, Scotty Hills, Chris "MAMA" Bauer, Chris Carmichael, and Chris Saywell (also of the D.Rangers).

They have played back up for Hubert Sumlin, Louisiana Red, Paul "Wine" Jones, Downchild Blues Band, George "Wild Child" Butler, Jim Byrnes, Kenny Brown, and Cedric Burnside, as well as recording with Juno winners Sue Foley and Big Dave McLean.

The band was a 2006 Western Canadian Music Award recipient for Outstanding Blues Album. The Perpetrators have also been nominated for a Juno Award and for Electric Act of the Year at the Toronto Blues Society's Ninth Annual Maple Blues Awards.

In January 2007, The Perpetrators released a new single on Winnipeg radio stations titled "You're Gonna Kill Me", from their album Tow Truck. The album was released in April 2007 and was nominated for two 2008 Western Canadian Music Awards–best blues and best independent recordings. Winnipeg Free Press music reviewer Rob Williams named Tow Truck his favorite local album of the year. In the fall of 2008, their fourth album, recorded live at their home base, the High & Lonesome Club, was released just before they undertook their fourth European tour, with Scotty Hills behind the drumkit.

Nowicki performs regularly with Romi Mayes. McMahon and Menard perform with a variety of acts. The Perpetrators play shows in and around Winnipeg, Manitoba, Canada and occasionally tour.

== Discography ==
=== Albums ===
- The Perpetrators (2003)
- The Gas and the Clutch (2005, WCMA Blues album of the year)
- Tow Truck (2007)
- Live at the High & Lonesome Club (2008)
- Stick Em Up (2013)

=== Compilations ===
- Winnipeg: The High & Lonesome Years, Vol. I and Vol. III (2002 and 2004)
- Guess Who's Home (tribute to the Guess Who) (2005)
- We Best Choose to Pick the Blues (tribute to Big Dave McLean) (2005)

== See also ==
- List of bands from Canada
