= List of Indigenous musicians in Canada =

This List of Indigenous musicians in Canada includes musicians, composers, DJs, and singers who are Indigenous peoples living in or from Canada, which includes First Nations people, Inuit, and Métis. They play diverse styles of music including Indigenous music of Canada.

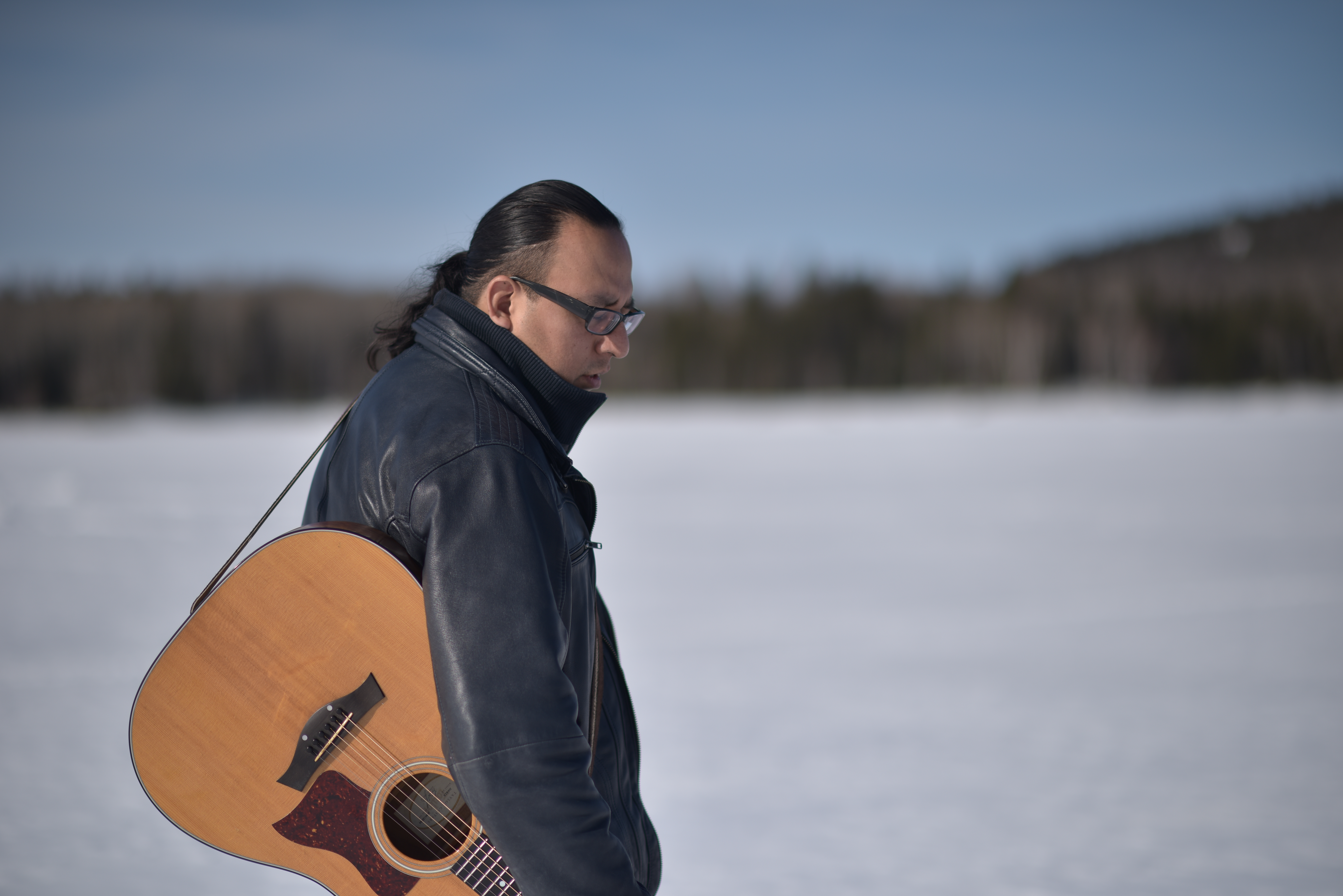
Atikamekw musician Sakay Ottawa

== Reggae ==
- Shauit (Innu)

== Blues ==
- Pappy Johns Band (Six Nations)
- Blue Moon Marquee (Métis)
- Celeigh Cardinal (Métis)
- G. R. Gritt (Métis)
- Jani Lauzon (Métis)
- Quantum Tangle (Inuit)
- Crystal Shawanda (Ojibwe Potawatomi)
- Billy Joe Green (Anishinaabe)
- Gary Farmer (Cayuga)
- Derek Miller (Six Nations)

== Classical ==
- Timothy Archambault (Kichesipirini Algonquin First Nation), composer and flautist from Connecticut
- Andrew Balfour
- John Kim Bell (Kahnawake Mohawk), conductor, pianist, composer
- Ian Cusson
- Cris Derksen
- Jeremy Dutcher (Wolastoqiyik)
- Akina Shirt (Cree), choral vocalist

== DJs ==
- DJ Shub (Mohawk)
- The Halluci Nation (Mohawk)

== Country and folk ==
Includes Canadian fiddling

- Phyllis Sinclair (Cree)
- Claude McKenzie (Innu)
- Phillippe McKenzie (Innu)
- Matiu (Innu)
- Kanen (Innu)
- Kathia Rock (Innu)
- Scott-Pien Picard (Innu)
- Florent Vollant (Innu)
- Maten (Innu)
- Laura Niquay (Atikamekw)
- Sakay Ottawa (Atikamekw)
- Ivan Boivin (Atikamekw)
- Régis Niquay (Atikamekw)
- Morgan Toney (Mi'kmaq)
- Aasiva (Inuk), indie folk singer-songwriter
- Susan Aglukark, ᓲᓴᓐ ᐊᒡᓘᒃᑲᖅ, Inuit folk, country, and pop singer
- Arlette Alcock (Métis)
- Don Amero (Métis)
- John Arcand (Métis)
- Jason Burnstick (Plains Cree)
- Celeigh Cardinal (Métis)
- Vern Cheechoo (Cree)
- Andy de Jarlis (Métis)
- Beatrice Deer (Inuk)
- Willie Dunn (Mi'kmaq)
- Ferron (Métis)
- Nadia Gaudet (Métis)
- Becky Han (Inuk)
- Joshua Haulli (Inuk)
- Lawrence "Teddy Boy" Houle (Métis)
- Tom Jackson (One Arrow Cree)
- The Jerry Cans (Inuit)
- Berk Jodoin (Métis)
- Juurini (Inuit)
- Simeonie Keenainak (Inuk)
- Jess Lee (Métis)
- Lawrence "Wapistan" Martin (Cree)
- Kyle McKearney (Métis)
- Charlie Panigoniak (Inuk)
- William Prince (Anisininew)
- Tumasi Quissa (Inuk)
- Amanda Rheaume (Métis)
- Harry (Etsuka) Rusk (Dene)
- Crystal Shawanda (Ojibwe Potawatomi)
- Morgan Toney (Mi'kmaq)
- Billy Thunderkloud & the Chieftones (Gitksan)
- Andrina Turenne (Métis)
- Terry Uyarak (Inuk)
- Laura Vinson (Métis)
- Leela Gilday (Dene)

== Inuit customary music ==
This includes throat singing.

- Susan Aglukark, ᓲᓴᓐ ᐊᒡᓘᒃᑲᖅ, Inuit folk, country, and pop singer
- Madeleine Allakariallak (Inuk)
- Susan Avingaq (Inuk)
- The Jerry Cans (Inuit)
- Ruben Komangapik (Inuk)
- william Koperqualuk (Inuk)
- Shina Novalinga (Inuk)
- Quantum Tangle (Inuit)
- Riit, also Rita Claire Mike-Murphy (Inuk)
- Alacie Tullaugaq (Inuk)

== Jazz ==
- Andrea Menard (Métis)

== Opera ==
- Joanna Burt (Métis/Saugeen Ojibway descent)

== Pop and rock ==
- Anachnid (Anisininew, Mi'kmaq)
- Aysanabee (Anisininew)
- Beatrice Deer (Inuk)
- Digging Roots (Anishinaabe, Haudenosaunee)
- Elisapie (Inuk)
- Kelly Fraser (Inuk)
- Sebastian Gaskin (Cree)
- Lucie Idlout (Inuk)
- iskwē (Métis)
- The Jerry Cans (Inuit)
- Charlie Kerr, lead singer of Hotel Mira (Cree Métis)
- Quantum Tangle (Inuit)
- Riit, also Rita Claire Mike-Murphy (Inuk)
- Robbie Robertson (Mohawk)
- Leanne Betasamosake Simpson (Mississauga Nishnaabeg)
- Siibii (Cree)
- Sister Ray (Métis)
- Logan Staats (Mohawk)
- Leonard Sumner (Anishinaabe)
- Adrian Sutherland (Cree)
- Tanya Tagaq (Inuk)
- Julian Taylor (Mohawk)
- Willie Thrasher (Inuk)
- Twin Flames (Mohawk, Inuit, Métis, Algonquin, Cree)
- Veronica Johnny (Cree, Métis)
- Ruby Waters (Métis)
- Tom Wilson (Mohawk)
- Jayli Wolf (Saulteau)
- Terry Uyarak (Inuk)

== Powwow music ==
- Fawn Wood (Cree, Interior Salish)
- Northern Cree (Plains Cree)
- Black Bear Singers (Atikamekw)
- Young Spirit (Cree)

== Rap and hip hop ==
- Boslen
- Digawolf (Dene, Tłı̨chǫ)
- JB the First Lady (Nuxalk, Onondaga)
- Hyper-T (Inuk)
- Wab Kinew (Anishinaabe)
- Samian (Algonquin)
- Silla + Rise (Inuit)
- Snotty Nose Rez Kids (Haisla)
- Kinnie Starr (Mohawk)
- Joey Stylez (Ojibwe)

== See also ==
- Indigenous music of North America
- List of Native American musicians, United States
- List of First Nations peoples
- Category:First Nations musicians
- Category:Inuit musicians
- Category:Métis musicians
