= Inuit Nunangat =

Inuit regions of Canada

Inuit Nunangat ᐃᓄᐃᑦ ᓄᓇᖓᑦ
- Inuit Regions of Canada
- State: Canada
- Regions: Inuvialuit Settlement Region; Nunavut; Nunavik; Nunatsiavut
- Province / Territory: YT, NT, NU, QC, NL

Area
  - Total: 3,304,740 km^{2} (1,275,970 sq mi)
  - Land: 2,484,591 km^{2} (959,306 sq mi)
  - Water: 820,149 km^{2} (316,661 sq mi)

Population (2021)
  - Total: 58,220
  - Density: 0.02343/km^{2} (0.06069/sq mi)

Ethnicity population
  - Inuit: 48,695
  - First Nations: 980
  - Métis: 325
  - Other Indigenous: 500
  - Non-Aboriginal: 7,715
- Time zone: UTC−08:00 (PST); UTC−07:00 (MST); UTC−06:00 (CST); UTC−05:00 (EST); UTC−04:00 (AST)
  - Summer (DST): Varies
- Inuit languages (west to east): Inuvialuktun; Inuinnaqtun; Inuktitut; Inuit Sign Language; Inuttitut
- Website: www.itk.ca/about-canadian-inuit/#nunangat

Inuit Nunangat (/ˈɪnjuɪt ˈnunæŋæt/; Inuktitut: ᐃᓄᐃᑦ ᓄᓇᖓᑦ [inuit nunaŋat] lit. 'Inuit's land'), part of the larger Inuit Nunaat (ᐃᓄᐃᑦ ᓄᓈᑦ), is the homeland of the Inuit in Canada. This Arctic homeland consists of four northern Canadian regions called the Inuvialuit Settlement Region (Inuvialuit Nunangit Sannaiqtuaq, home of the Inuvialuit and the northern portion of the Northwest Territories and Yukon), the territory Nunavut (ᓄᓇᕗᑦ), Nunavik (ᓄᓇᕕᒃ) in northern Quebec, and Nunatsiavut of Newfoundland and Labrador.

== Etymology ==
The name Inuit Nunangat is composed of two elements: Inuit and Nunangat, both coming from Inuktitut. The first means "people", inherited from Proto-Inuit's *iŋuɣ meaning "human being". The second combines the word nuna "land" with the third person possessive ending -ngat, together meaning "their land".

Inuit of Canada originally used the Greenlandic Inuit term Nunaat which excludes the waters and ice. In 2009 the Inuit Tapiriit Kanatami formally switched to the Inuktitut Nunangat in 2009 to reflect the integral nature "land, water, and ice" have to Inuit culture.

== History ==
=== Inuit arrival ===
Inuit are the most recent Indigenous arrivals on the continent aside from Métis. Inuit ancestors known as the Thule settled the Arctic, replacing the previous dominant Dorset culture (Tuniit) over the course of around 200 years. Displacement of the Tuniit (Inuktitut syllabics; ᑐᓃᑦ), or the Dorset people, and the arrival of the Inuit (whose ancestors are often called Thule) occurred in the 1100–1300s CE. Coming from Siberia where they split from the Aleut and other related peoples about 4,000 years ago, Inuit had reached Inughuit Nunaat in western Greenland by about 1300 CE, bringing with them transport dogs and various new technologies.

Trade relations were and remain strong with bordering countries and nations, such as with the Gwichʼin and Dënesųłı̨né (Chipewyan) of Denendeh (now in the Northwest Territories) and Innu of Nitassinan (Innu: ᓂᑕᔅᓯᓇᓐ), though occasional conflicts arose. Martin Frobisher's 1576 expedition to find the Northwest Passage landed on Baffin Island, in today's Qikiqtaaluk Region (Inuktitut syllabics: ᕿᑭᖅᑖᓗᒃ ), where three Inuit, a man called Calichough (Kalicho), an unrelated woman called Egnock (Arnaq), and her child Nutioc (Nuttaaq), were kidnapped and brought to Europe, where they all died.

=== Canadian colonization ===
Canadian colonization extended in to Inuit Nunangat via the lands claimed as Rupert's Land, North-Western Territory and Quebec, later including Newfoundland and Labrador. Rapid spread of diseases, material wealth and Canadian (Royal Canadian Mounted Police) policing saw a rapid decline and collapse of Inuit Nunangat, from which it is still recovering.

Since European colonizers had little desire to settle much of Inuit Nunangat's territories, the violence experienced by southern First Nations was comparatively minimal in the north. However, assimilation policies including the wide-scale slaughter of community dogs between 1950 and 1970, the High Arctic relocation as well as forced participation within the Canadian Indian residential school system has left Inuit society with language loss and transgenerational trauma.

=== Modern era ===
Today, Inuit Nunangat is overseen by the Inuit Tapiriit Kanatami (ᐃᓄᐃᑦ ᑕᐱᕇᑦ ᑲᓇᑕᒥ, meaning either "Inuit are united with Canada" or "Inuit are united in Canada") which acts as a cultural centre piece and quasi-central government for Inuit affairs within Canada.

While Nunavut's confederation within Canada in 1999 via the Nunavut Act and Nunavut Land Claims Agreement is most visible, each of the regions of Inuit Nunangat has its own history. The Inuvialuit Settlement Region (Inuinnaqtun: Inuvialuit Nunangit Sannaiqtuaq) came under the jurisdiction of the Inuvialuit Regional Corporation two years after the 1984 Inuvialuit Final Agreement, and Nunatsiavut was granted an autonomous government in 2005 after the 2002 Labrador Inuit Association proposal for a separate government. Beginning with a land claim in 1977, negotiations launched in 1988 between the Labrador Inuit Association, the governments of Newfoundland and Labrador and that of Canada. In Northern Quebec, the Makivik Corporation was established upon the James Bay and Northern Quebec Agreement signing in 1978, taking the mantle from the previous Nunavimmiut organization, the "Northern Quebec Inuit Association" (ᑯᐸᐃᒃ ᑕᕐᕋᖓᓂ ᐃᓄᐃᑦ ᑲᑐᔾᔨᖃᑎᒌᖏᑦ Kupaik Tarrangani Inuit Katujjiqatigiingit).

The Inuit-Crown Partnership Committee (ICPC) was created in 2017 and last met on April 21, 2022. At this meeting, the Canadian federal government, in partnership with the Inuit Nunangat, unanimously endorsed the federal policy called the Inuit Nunangat Policy (INP). In a live address shortly after this meeting, the Canadian Prime Minister, Justin Trudeau, said the policy "recognizes the Inuit homeland as a distinct geographical, cultural and political region," which includes the "land, sea, and ice."

== Demographics ==
As of the 2021 Canadian census the population of Inuit Nunangat was 58,220 an increase of 2.9 per cent over the 2016 census population of 56,585. The Indigenous population is 50,500 or 89.24 per cent of the total population, of which 48,695 (83.63 per cent) are Inuit.

Population of Inuit Nunangat
Region	Inuit			First Nations			Métis			Other Indigenous			Non-Indigenous			Totals		
	2021	2016	% change	2021	2016	% change	2021	2016	% change	2021	2016	% change	2021	2016	% change	2021	2016	% change
Inuvialuit Settlement Region	3,145	3,110	1.1%	655	860	−23.8%	140	130	7.7%	140	25	460.0%	1,230	1,205	2.1%	5,310	5,330	−0.4%
Nunavut	30,865	30,135	2.4%	180	190	−5.3%	120	165	−27.3%	225	60	275.0%	5,210	5,025	3.7%	36,600	35,575	2.9%
Nunavik	12,595	11,800	6.7%	115	135	−14.8%	35	30	16.7%	120	30	300.0%	1,125	1,130	−0.4%	13,990	13,125	6.6%
Nunatsiavut	2,090	2,290	−8.7%	30	25	20.0%	30	35	−14.3%	15	0	inf%	150	205	−26.8%	2.320	2,555	−9.2%
Totals	48,695	47,335	2.9%	980	1,210	−19.0%	325	360	−9.7%	500	115	334.8%	7.715	7,565	2.0%	58,220	56,585	2.9%

In 2021 of those Inuit living in Inuit Nunangat 6.46 per cent live in the Inuvialuit Settlement Region, 63.38 per cent in Nunavut, 25.87 per cent in Nunavik and 4.29 per cent in Nunatsiavut.

In total there are 70,545 Inuit in Canada with 48,695 (69.02 per cent) living in Inuit Nunangat and 21,850 (30.98 per cent) living in other parts of Canada. This is a growth of 8.5 per cent over 2016 when there were 65,025 Inuit in Canada with 47,335 (72.80 per cent) living in Inuit Nunangat and 17,695 (27.21 per cent) living in other parts of Canada.

=== Communities ===
There are six communities in the Inuvialuit Settlement Region (ISR). The ISR is made up of five hamlets and one town, Inuvik, which is the headquarters of the Inuvialuit Regional Corporation and the regional centre for the larger Inuvik Region.

There are twenty-five populated communities in Nunavut, The territory is divided into three regions, Kitikmeot, with the regional centre in Cambridge Bay, the Kivalliq, with the regional centre in Rankin Inlet, and the Qikiqtaaluk, with the regional centre and capital in Iqaluit. Other than Iqaluit, which is a city, all other Nunavut communities are hamlets. Statistics Canada also lists three settlements, Bathurst Inlet (also recognized by the Government of Nunavut), Nanisivik and Umingmaktok, all with a population of zero.

In Nunavik there are fourteen northern villages (village nordique, code=VN), governed by the Kativik Regional Government with the administrative capital at Kuujjuaq. All villages, with the exception of Puvirnituq, have Inuit reserved land (Terre de la catégorie I pour les Inuits, TI) associated with the community.

There are five towns in Nunatsiavut. The Nunatsiavut Assembly Building is located in Hopedale while the administrative capital is in Nain.

The government of Canada also lists Bathurst Inlet, Killiniq and Umingmaktuuq (Umingmaktok) as forming part of Inuit Nunangat, giving a total of 53 communities.

Communities in Inuit Nunangat
Name	Region	Type	Pop. (2021)	Pop. (2016)	% diff.	Land area	Pop den (km^{2})	Pop den (sqmi)	Inuit	% of total population	First Nations	Métis	Other Indigenous	Non Indigenous
Aklavik	Inuvialuit Settlement Region	Hamlet	536	590	−9.2%	12.29	43.6	112.9	320	59.7%	130	25	15	46
Akulivik	Nunavik	Northern Village Municipality	642	633	1.4%	75.02	8.6	22.3	635	98.9%	0	0	0	7
Arctic Bay	Nunavut	Hamlet	994	868	14.5%	245.16	4.1	10.6	960	96.6%	0	0	0	34
Arviat	Nunavut	Hamlet	2,864	2,657	7.8%	126.14	22.7	58.8	2,715	94.8%	0	0	10	139
Aupaluk	Nunavik	Northern Village Municipality	233	209	11.5%	28.68	8.1	21.0	215	92.3%	0	0	0	18
Baker Lake	Nunavut	Hamlet	2,061	2,069	−0.4%	179.54	11.5	29.8	1,870	90.7%	20	0	20	151
Cambridge Bay	Nunavut	Hamlet	1,760	1,766	−0.3%	195.78	9.0	23.3	1,400	79.5%	10	15	25	310
Chesterfield Inlet	Nunavut	Hamlet	397	437	−9.2%	139.49	2.8	7.3	370	93.2%	0	0	0	27
Clyde River	Nunavut	Hamlet	1,181	1,053	12.2%	103.38	11.4	29.5	1,150	97.4%	0	0	0	31
Coral Harbour	Nunavut	Hamlet	1,035	891	16.2%	126.39	8.2	21.2	975	94.2%	0	0	0	60
Gjoa Haven	Nunavut	Hamlet	1,349	1,324	1.9%	28.55	47.3	122.5	1,265	93.8%	0	0	15	69
Grise Fiord	Nunavut	Hamlet	144	129	11.6%	332.90	0.4	1.0	135	93.8%	0	0	0	9
Hopedale	Nunatsiavut	Town	596	574	3.8%	2.18	273.7	708.9	550	92.3%	10	0	0	36
Igloolik	Nunavut	Hamlet	2,049	1,744	17.5%	108.46	19.5	50.5	1,935	94.4%	10	0	0	104
Inukjuak	Nunavik	Northern Village Municipality	1,821	1,757	3.6%	54.92	33.2	86.0	1,775	97.5%	0	0	0	46
Inuvik	Inuvialuit Settlement Region	Town	3,137	3,243	−3.3%	62.68	50.0	129.5	1,265	40.3%	520	115	95	1,142
Iqaluit	Nunavut	City	7,429	7,740	−4.0%	51.58	144.0	373.0	3,830	51.6%	95	65	65	3,374
Ivujivik	Nunavik	Northern Village Municipality	412	414	−0.5%	35.15	11.7	30.3	405	98.3%	0	0	0	7
Kangiqsualujjuaq	Nunavik	Northern Village Municipality	956	942	1.5%	34.33	27.9	72.3	825	86.3%	0	0	0	131
Kangiqsujuaq	Nunavik	Northern Village Municipality	837	750	11.6%	12.41	67.5	174.8	770	92.0%	0	0	0	67
Kangirsuk	Nunavik	Northern Village Municipality	561	567	−1.1%	57.15	9.8	25.4	515	91.8%	25	0	0	21
Kimmirut	Nunavut	Hamlet	426	389	9.5%	2.30	184.9	478.9	420	98.6%	0	0	0	6
Kinngait	Nunavut	Hamlet	1,396	1,441	−3.1%	9.89	141.2	365.7	1,310	93.8%	0	0	10	76
Kugaaruk	Nunavut	Hamlet	1,033	933	10.7%	5.06	204.2	528.9	935	90.5%	0	0	0	98
Kugluktuk	Nunavut	Hamlet	1,382	1,491	−7.3%	538.99	2.6	6.7	1,215	87.9%	0	0	10	157
Kuujjuaq	Nunavik	Northern Village Municipality	2,668	2,754	−3.1%	289.97	9.2	23.8	2,000	75.0%	10	10	10	638
Kuujjuarapik	Nunavik	Northern Village Municipality	792	654	21.1%	7.45	106.3	275.3	600	75.8%	50	0	85	57
Makkovik	Nunatsiavut	Town	365	377	−3.2%	2.95	123.5	319.9	295	80.8%	0	20	0	50
Nain	Nunatsiavut	Town	847	1,125	−24.7%	93.50	9.1	23.6	790	93.3%	50	0	0	7
Naujaat	Nunavut	Hamlet	1,255	1,082	16.0%	406.19	3.0	7.8	1,200	95.6%	0	0	0	55
Pangnirtung	Nunavut	Hamlet	1,504	1,481	1.6%	7.98	188.5	488.2	1,370	91.1%	10	0	40	84
Paulatuk	Inuvialuit Settlement Region	Hamlet	298	265	12.5%	63.58	4.7	12.2	270	90.6%	0	0	0	28
Pond Inlet	Nunavut	Hamlet	1,555	1,617	−3.8%	170.83	9.1	23.6	1,450	93.2%	0	0	10	95
Postville	Nunatsiavut	Town	188	177	6.2%	2.39	78.7	203.8	160	85.1%	0	10	0	18
Puvirnituq	Nunavik	Northern Village Municipality	2,129	1,779	19.7%	81.61	26.1	67.6	1,965	92.3%	0	0	10	154
Qikiqtarjuaq	Nunavut	Hamlet	593	598	−0.8%	130.80	4.5	11.7	555	93.6%	0	10	0	28
Quaqtaq	Nunavik	Northern Village Municipality	453	403	12.4%	25.82	17.5	45.3	435	96.0%	0	0	0	18
Rankin Inlet	Nunavut	Hamlet	2,975	2,842	4.7%	20.03	148.5	384.6	2,475	83.2%	25	15	10	450
Resolute	Nunavut	Hamlet	183	198	−7.6%	115.02	1.6	4.1	165	90.2%	0	0	0	18
Rigolet	Nunatsiavut	Town	327	305	7.2%	5.27	62.0	160.6	300	91.7%	10	0	0	17
Sachs Harbour	Inuvialuit Settlement Region	Hamlet	103	104	−1.0%	272.22	0.4	1.0	95	92.2%	0	0	0	8
Salluit	Nunavik	Northern Village Municipality	1,580	1,483	6.5%	15.08	104.8	271.4	1,505	95.3%	0	10	0	65
Sanikiluaq	Nunavut	Hamlet	1,010	882	14.5%	109.68	9.2	23.8	950	94.1%	0	0	0	60
Sanirajak	Nunavut	Hamlet	891	848	5.1%	16.36	54.5	141.2	840	94.3%	0	0	0	51
Taloyoak	Nunavut	Hamlet	934	1,029	−9.2%	35.38	26.4	68.4	900	96.4%	0	0	0	34
Tasiujaq	Nunavik	Northern Village Municipality	420	369	13.8%	65.53	6.4	16.6	415	98.8%	0	0	0	5
Tuktoyaktuk	Inuvialuit Settlement Region	Hamlet	937	898	4.3%	12.66	74.0	191.7	815	87.0%	10	0	25	87
Ulukhaktok	Inuvialuit Settlement Region	Hamlet	408	396	3.0%	120.71	3.4	8.8	380	93.1%	0	0	0	28
Umiujaq	Nunavik	Northern Village Municipality	541	442	22.4%	28.38	19.1	49.5	530	98.0%	0	0	10	1
Whale Cove	Nunavut	Hamlet	470	435	8.0%	273.89	1.7	4.4	445	94.7%	0	0	0	25

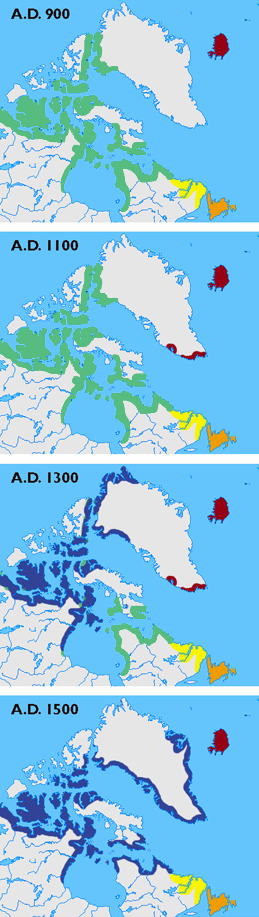
Arctic cultures from 900 to 1500: Dorset / Innu; Thule / Beothuk; Norse

=== Languages ===
Maps of Inuit oral languages.

Map of Greenlandic and Inuit Sign Languages.

There are multiple Inuit languages, along with English and French, spoken across Inuit Nunangat. The oral languages form a vast dialect continuum with mutual intelligibility between neighbouring variants from the westernmost Iñupiatun dialect to the three Greenlandic languages: Kalaallisut, Tunumiisut, and, the closest variation to Canadian dialects, Inuktun. In Canada, there is Inuvialuktun spoken in the West in Inuvialuit Settlement Region (Inuvialuit Nunangit Sannaiqtuaq); Inuktitut, the most spoken dialect; Inuinnaqtun which straddles the line between Inuktitut and Inuvialuktun; and Inuttitut spoken in the Labradorian east by Nunatsiavummiut. And, attested contemporarily only in a few Nunavut communities, Inuit Sign Language (also known as Atgangmuurngniq and Uukturausingit) continues to be passed down through generations regardless of deafness. It is unknown by academia if there is any relation between Greenlandic and Inuit Sign Languages or if Greenlandic Sign Language is a dialect of Danish Tegnsprog.

Within each of the primary oral language divisions, collectively referred to as Inuktut, (Inuvialuktun, Inuinnaqtun, Inuktitut, Inuktitut, and Inuttut), there exist several dialects therein. Within Inuvialuktun, the Siglit who live at the mouth of the Mackenzie River (Inuvialuktun: Kuukpak [kuːkpɑk] literally great river) speak Siglitun; and the Uummarmiut, or "people of the green trees" and are sometimes called "Canadian Iñupiat," speak Uummarmiutun. Western Inuktut dialects are sometimes considered Inuvialuktun dialects, such as Inuinnaqtun (including one of its sub dialects, Kangiryuarmiutun, spoken by the Copper Inuit group, the Kangiryuarmiut). Others include Natsilingmiutut, spoken by the Netsilik, with its sub-dialects including Utkuhiksalik (the language of the "people of the place where there is soapstone": Utkuhiksalingmiut); Kivallirmiutut spoken by the Caribou Inuit of the Kivalliq Region; Aivilingmiutut of the Aivilingmiut; and the northern Qikiqtaaluk uannangani spoken by Iglulingmiut of the Igloolik. On the southern part of Baffin Island (Qikiqtaaluk) around the Nunavut capital Iqaluit, Qikiqtaaluk nigiani is spoken, and relatively close is the dialect of Nunavik, Nunavimmiutitut, sometimes called Tarramiutut, Taqramiutut, or Inuttitut (not to be confused with Nunatsiavummiutut (Inuttitut) of Labrador). Nunavimmiutitut includes the sub dialects spoken by the Tarrarmiut and Itivimuit. Nunatsiavummiut in Nunatsiavut, Labrador speak Inuttitut, Inuttut, or, alternatively, Labradorimiutut.

=== People ===
Inuvialuit Settlement Region (Inuvialuit Nunangat)

Nunavut

Nunavik

Nunatsiavut

Inuit are diverse peoples who share cultural and linguistic similarities. Moreover, they are a bimodal people, speaking both oral languages, Inuit languages, and sign languages, Inuit Sign Language (Atgangmuurniq).

=== Peoples of Inuit Nunangat ===
- Inuvialuit (people of the Inuvialuit Settlement Region, northwestern Northwest Territories, seasonally in northern Yukon)
- Nunavummiut (people of Nunavut (Note: The word is not Inuit specific and refers to all residents of Nunavut.))
- Nunavimmiut (people of Nunavik, northern Quebec)
- Nunatsiavummiut / Labradorimiut (people of Nunatsiavut, northern Labrador)

=== Inuit outside Nunangat ===
- Greenlandic Inuit (Greenlandic: kalaallit, Greenland)
- Iñupiaq (northern and northwestern Alaska)

=== Related peoples ===
- Yup'ik (western Alaska)
- Alutiiq (Sugpiaq, southern Alaska)
- Siberian Yupik (Bering Strait, Russia and Alaska)
- Sirenik Eskimos (eastern Siberia)
- Aleut (Aleutian and Kommodor islands)

== Geography ==
Spanning much of the North American Arctic, Inuit Nunangat is mostly above the tree line. It is situated in Northern Canada, and some tribes can even expand to Siberia, Alaska and Greenland.

=== Climate change ===
In 2019, Inuit Tapiriit Kanatami released their National Inuit Climate Change Strategy to combat and respond to the ecological collapse and its effects on Inuit and Inuit Nunangat.

== Culture ==
Inuit culture includes numerous music styles, sports and other cultural attributes.

Inuit Nunangat has produced numerous contemporary bands and singers, such as Joshua Haulli, Quantum Tangle, The Jerry Cans (Inuktitut syllabics: ᐸᐃ ᒑᓚᖃᐅᑎᒃᑯᑦ, Pai Gaalaqautikkut), Elisapie (Inuktitut syllabics: ᐃᓕᓴᐱ), Aasiva, Charlie Panigoniak, Riit (Inuktitut syllabics: ᕇᑦ), Willie Thrasher, and Tumasi Quissa, as well as many others. Of particular note is Inuit throat singing performed by artists such as Qaunaq Mikkigak, Tudjaat, and Tanya Tagaq (Inuktitut syllabics: ᑕᓐᔭ ᑕᒐᖅ). Yearly, the Alianait Music and Arts Festival features talented acts from across Inuit Nunangat, Canada, and the world, as one of many festivals that take place.

Inuit art first came to outside attention in the 1940s through printmaking and carving. It is known for the use of soapstone, such as for carvings and for making qulliq (Inuktitut syllabics: ᖁᓪᓕᖅ, seal oil lamps). Although power tools are used, soapstone carving is often preferably done by axe and file.

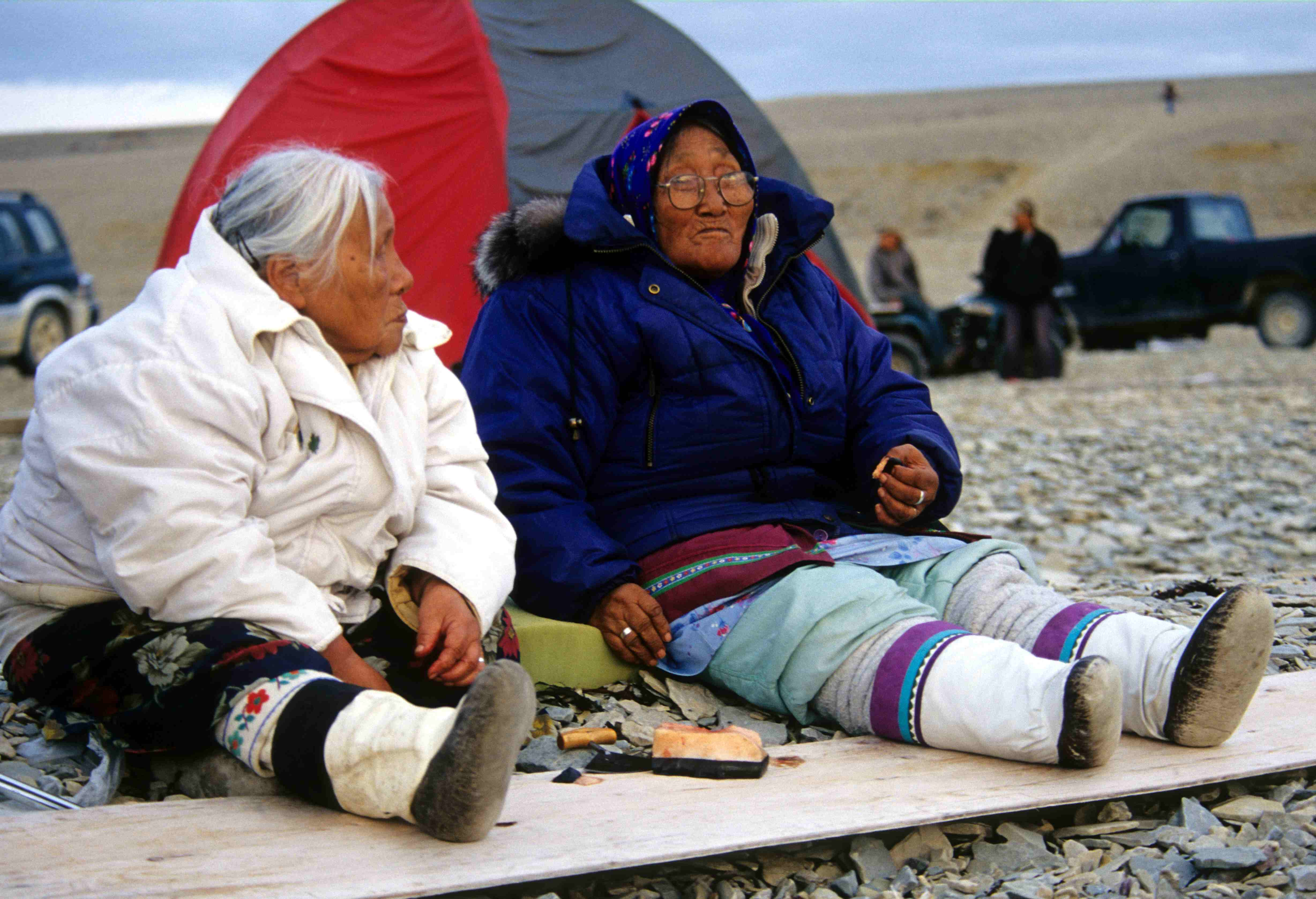
Elders sharing maktaaq, 2002

The modern kayak originates from Inuit culture, originally called a qajaq (Inuktitut syllabics: ᖃᔭᖅ). As well, Inuit use the larger (6–12 m (20–39 ft)), wood-framed flat-bottomed umiak or umiaq for transporting people, goods, and dogs; and, on land, qamutiik (dog sled) pulled by the Canadian Eskimo Dogs or huskies, known in Inuit languages as qimmiit, though Inuit have since transitioned to motorized forms of transport such as the snowmobile for navigating. In part because the massacre of most of their sled dogs in the eastern part of Inuit Nunangat between the 1950s and 1970s. It was believed that the killings were done in order to force Inuit out of their traditional way of life and assimilate them into southern Canadian society. In 2007, the Qikiqtani Inuit Association organized the Qikiqtani Truth Commission, one year after a Royal Canadian Mounted Police report denying the slaughter of 20,000 dogs to help force Inuit into settlements, and stated that "the killings went on far too long to be the result of a secret plan or conspiracy, and that the dog killings began ... several years before the federal government adopted a formal central policy of dog control." On 14 August 2019, the Minister of Crown–Indigenous Relations, Carolyn Bennett, apologized to the Qikiqtani Inuit for the slaughter.

Inuit cuisine, also known as "country food," incorporates a variety of meats (such as walrus, narwhal, bearded seal, caribou, polar bear, Arctic cod, and Arctic char, among others) and gathered plants (including crowberries, cloudberries, fireweed, seaweed, tubers and roots like mousefood, tuberous spring beauty, and sweet vetch) Much of the meat is served frozen, raw, or boiled, much like sushi or sashimi in Japanese cuisine. Delicacies include akutuq (Inuktitut syllabics: ᐊᑯᑐᖅ), an ice cream-like dessert made with fat or tallow, meat, and mixed with berries; igunaq (Inuktitut syllabics: ᐃᒍᓇᖅ), a year-long fermentation of select meats; muktuk (Inuktitut syllabics: ᒪᒃᑖᖅ) (alternatively, maktaaq, maktak (Inuktitut syllabics: ᒪᒃᑕᒃ) or maktaq), whale skin and blubber usually eaten raw, sometimes frozen or pickled, and occasionally finely diced, breaded, deep fried, and then served with soy sauce; Labrador tea; and various dips such as aalu (Inuktitut syllabics: ᐋᓗ) (intended for meat made from the choice parts of caribou or seal, chopped into tiny pieces and blended with melted fat and blood), misiraq (Inuktitut syllabics: ᒥᓯᕋᖅ) (aged to resemble an aromatic white wine, made from seal or whale blubber), and nirukkaq (Inuktitut syllabics: ᓂᕈᒃᑲᖅ), a smooth made pâté made from the contents of a caribou's stomach.

== Law ==
Inuit Nunangat currently functions through a variety of legal systems. As a Canadian jurisdiction, all of Inuit Nunangat falls under the federally overseen Criminal Code for criminal law. Inuvialuit Nunangat in the Northwest Territories and Yukon, Nunavut, and Nunatsiavut in Labrador are all subject to the English common law tradition. Nunavik, falling under the jurisdiction of Quebec, follows the civil law tradition as it pertains to private law. Finally, Inuit largely still follow Inuit Qaujimajatuqangit traditions, recognizing the interconnected nature of reality. Inuit Qaujimajatuqangit (Inuktitut syllabics: ᐃᓄᐃᑦ ᖃᐅᔨᒪᔭᑐᖃᖏᑦ, alternatively rendered Qaujimanituqangit or Qauyimayatuqangit), comes from the root word qaujima- (Inuktitut syllabics: ᖃᐅᔨ) meaning "to know," and could be literally translated as "that which has long been known by Inuit." Leaders and Elders did not see themselves as agents of social control or law and order, as each individual contributes to the functioning of the community. The integration of Inuit Qaujimajatuqangit (or IQ) and the wider Canadian legal tradition is an ongoing process. For example, the Nunavut Court of Justice is the only "unified," single-level court in Canada, and the court travels to communities every six weeks to two years. There are also on-the-land, restorative justice, and contemporary healing circle programs administered.

== See also ==
- Indigenous self-government in Canada
- Qimmit, a Clash of Two Truths
