= Music of Nunavut =

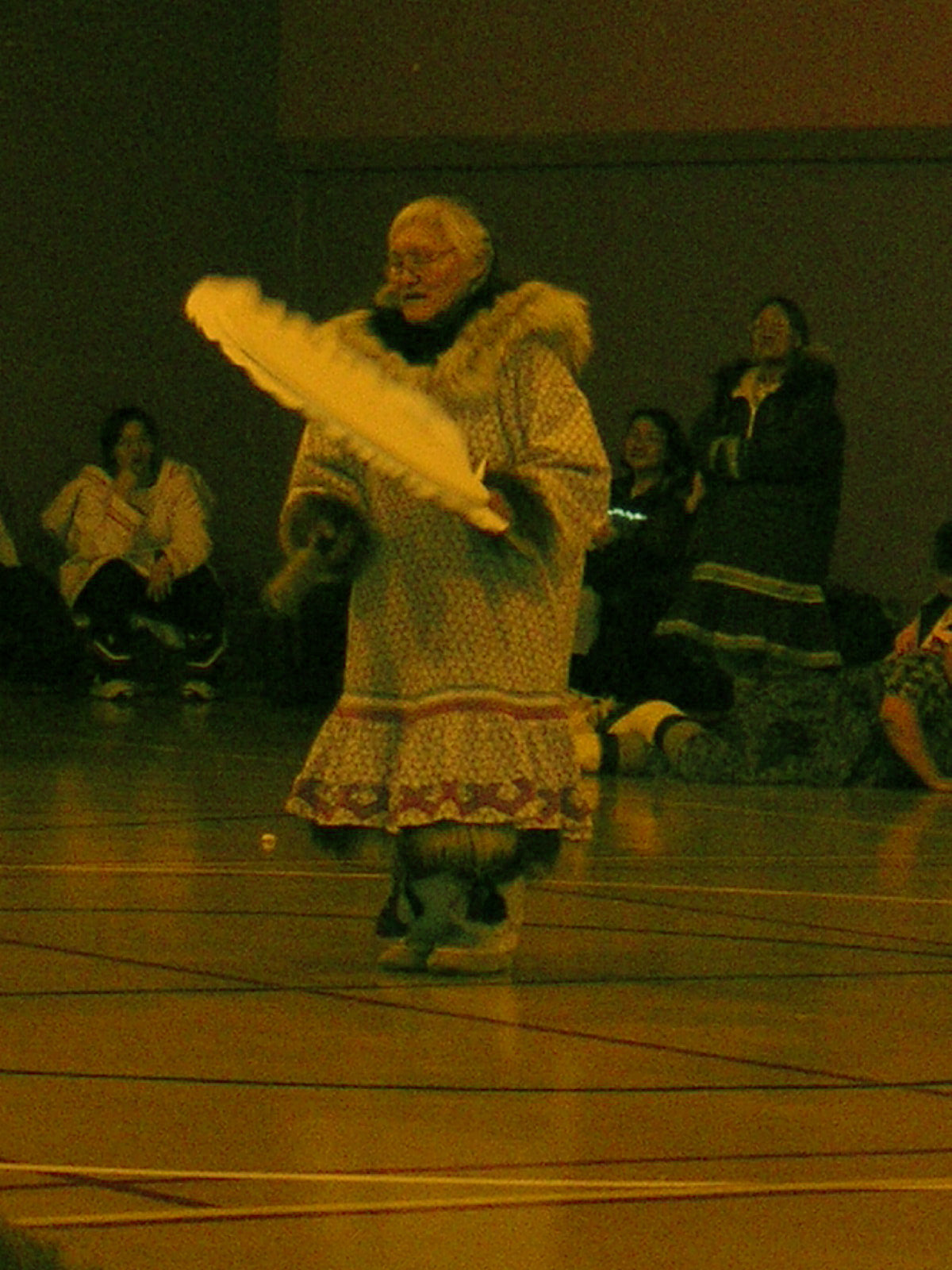
Dancer at a Drum Dance festival in Gjoa Haven, Nunavut in 2004.

Drum dancing, Gjoa Haven, 2019.

Nunavut is a territory of Canada, inhabited predominantly by the Inuit and to a much smaller degree other members of the First Nations. Inuit folk music has long been based primarily off percussion, used in dance music, as well as vocals, including the famous Inuit throat singing tradition.

== History ==
Early European immigration brought new styles and instruments to Nunavut, including country music, bluegrass, square dancing, the button accordion and the fiddle.

=== Traditional music ===
Drum-led dancing has long been an important part of Inuit life in Nunavut, and was used to mark all the major occasions of life – a birth, changing of the seasons, a successful hunt or a marriage. In a traditional dance, a group of women sat in a circle and sang while men danced one at a time. If no man volunteered to dance, a woman would choose a personal song of one of the men in the audience, and he would be obliged to dance. These dances lasted throughout the night, save for a few tea breaks. By the end of the night, women and children begin participating in the drumming. This dance is rarely performed in the modern era, and is almost always done as attractions for tourists.

Traditional Inuit songs from Nunavut included satirical, obscene, humorous, romantic and jesting songs, as well as rivalry songs, in which enemies insulted each other through lyrics. Most adults had their own personal song, which could be of any type. Personal songs may be given, either to someone bearing the same name, or as an object of appreciation for some help rendered.

Inuit throat-singing is performed by two women standing face to face. They repeat different sounds in a swift rhythm in a form of contest to see who can last the longest.

== Modern era ==
Modern musicians from Nunavut generally blend traditional Inuit music with mainstream forms of popular music such as rock, pop, country or gospel, though traditional music and other styles retain some popularity.

Well-known musicians from the territory include Lucie Idlout, Itulu Itidlui, Simon Sigjariaq, Mary Atuat Thompson, William Tagoona, Charlie Panigoniak, Tanya Tagaq, Tudjaat, Kelly Fraser, The Jerry Cans, Riit, Northern Haze and Peter and Susan Aningmiuq. Susan Aglukark, a major recording star in Canada, was raised in Arviat in Nunavut.

The True North Concert, held every year, has helped increase coverage of Inuit music.
