= Inuit music =

Traditional Inuit music (sometimes Eskimo music, Inuit-Yupik music, Yupik music or Iñupiat music), the music performed by Inuit, (Note: Inuk - singular, Inuit - plural, Inuuk - two people) Yupik, and Iñupiat, has been based on drums used in dance music as far back as can be known, and a vocal style called katajjaq (Inuit throat singing) has become of interest in Canada and abroad.

Characteristics of Inuit music include recitative-like singing, complex rhythmic organization, a relatively small melodic range averaging about a sixth, prominence of major thirds and minor seconds melodically, and undulating melodic movement.

The Copper Inuit living around Coppermine River flowing north to Coronation Gulf have generally two categories of music. A song is called pisik (also known as pisiit or piheq) if the performer also plays drums and aton if he only dances. Each pisik functions as a personal song of a drummer and is accompanied by dancing and singing. Each drummer has his own style and performs during gatherings. One drum is used in the performance of a pisik and often begins in a slow tempo, gradually building in intensity. The wooden frame drum, called a qilaut is played on the edge with a wooden beater called a qatuk. The performer tilts the drum from one side to another and dances in rhythm of the beats.

== Cultural role ==
Drum dancing, Gjoa Haven, Nunavut, Canada, 2019

Traditionally Inuit languages did not have a word for what a European-influenced listener or ethnomusicologist's understanding of music, "and ethnographic investigation seems to suggest that the concept of music as such is also absent from their culture." The closest word, nipi, includes music, the sound of speech and noise. Traditionally, "Eskimo songs seem to have been intended to be heard as parts of a whole—a series of auditory experiences."

Until the advent of commercial recording technology, the music was usually used in Inuit religion during spiritual ceremonies to ask the spirits for good luck in hunting or gambling, as well as simple lullabies. Inuit music has long been noted for a stoic lack of work or love songs. These musical beginnings were modified with the arrival of European whalers, especially from Scotland and Ireland. Instruments like the accordion were popularized, and dances like the jig or reel became common. Scots-Irish derived American country music has been especially popular among Inuit in the 20th century.

== Katajjaq (Inuit throat singing) ==
Katajjaq (also pirkusirtuk and nipaquhiit) or Inuit throat singing in English is a type of traditional competitive, but cooperative, song, considered a game, usually held between two women. It is one of the world's few examples of overtone singing, a unique method of producing sounds that is otherwise best known in Tuvan throat singing. When competing, two women stand face-to-face and sing using a complex method of following each other, thus that one voice hits a strong accent while the other hits a weak, melding the two voices into a nearly indistinguishable single sound. They repeat brief motifs at staggered intervals, often imitating natural sounds, like those of geese, caribou or other wildlife, until one runs out of breath, trips over her own tongue, or begins laughing, and the contest is then over. "The old woman who teaches the children corrects sloppy intonation of contours, poorly meshed phrase displacements, and vague rhythms exactly like a Western vocal coach."

== Influence from Western culture ==
Contact with European explorers in the 16th and 17th centuries brought Western influence to Inuit music. The microtonality and rhythmic complexity of the music was replaced with structures more resembling the structures of Western music.

Many contemporary Inuit musicians now blend aspects of traditional music with mainstream popular music genres such as rock, pop and country music.

== Vocal games ==
Inuit vocal games are usually played by two women facing each other in close proximity. They use the other participant's oral cavity as resonators but may also play under a kitchen pot for the resonances to be more pronounced. The game consists of repeating meaningless words in tight rhythmic canon. The strong accent of one participant coincides with the weak of the other. The breathing of the players are thus also alternated. Vocal techniques include voiced and voiceless articulations and different articulations, and different placement of sound in the chest, throat and nose areas.

Vocal games are unique to Inuit.

== Musical instruments ==
=== Percussion ===
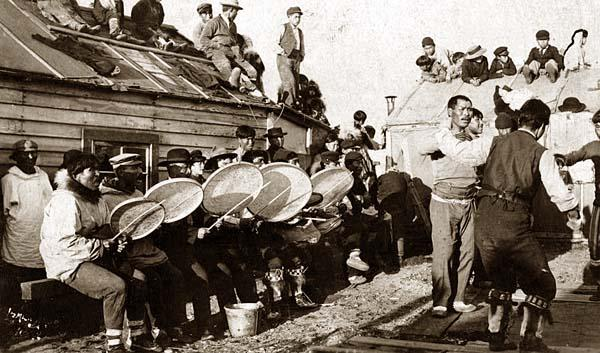
Drummer at an Inupiat dance near Nome in 1900.

The main percussion instrument is the wooden frame drum called the qilaut. It is made by boiling and bending strips of wood about 2 to 3 inches (5.1 to 7.6 centimetres) wide into a circular frame with a handle protruding out. Detailed animal skin, usually caribou, is stretched across the frame and fastened down with a string. The drum can reach one meter in diameter but are usually smaller, around 1 yard (0.91 metres) in length. It is struck on the edge of the rim by a qatuk, or a wooden beater. The resulting sound is a combination of the percussive attack from striking the wood and the resulting vibrations from the stretched membrane. Some groups such as the Inuvialuit living around the Mackenzie Delta use wands to beat the drums instead of thick wooden beaters.

Other percussion instruments include smaller drums and rattles.

The Jew's harp has also been introduced to Inuit and is played by certain groups such as Arviat previously known as Eskimo Point Canada.

=== String instruments ===
The tautirut is an Inuit bowed zither, similar to the fiðla or Icelandic fiddle. It is not clear as to whether the instrument is purely indigenous, or introduced by Nordic sailors, either pre or post-Columbus. Inuit culture is one of the few cultures of the Americas to have a chordophone or string instrument tradition.

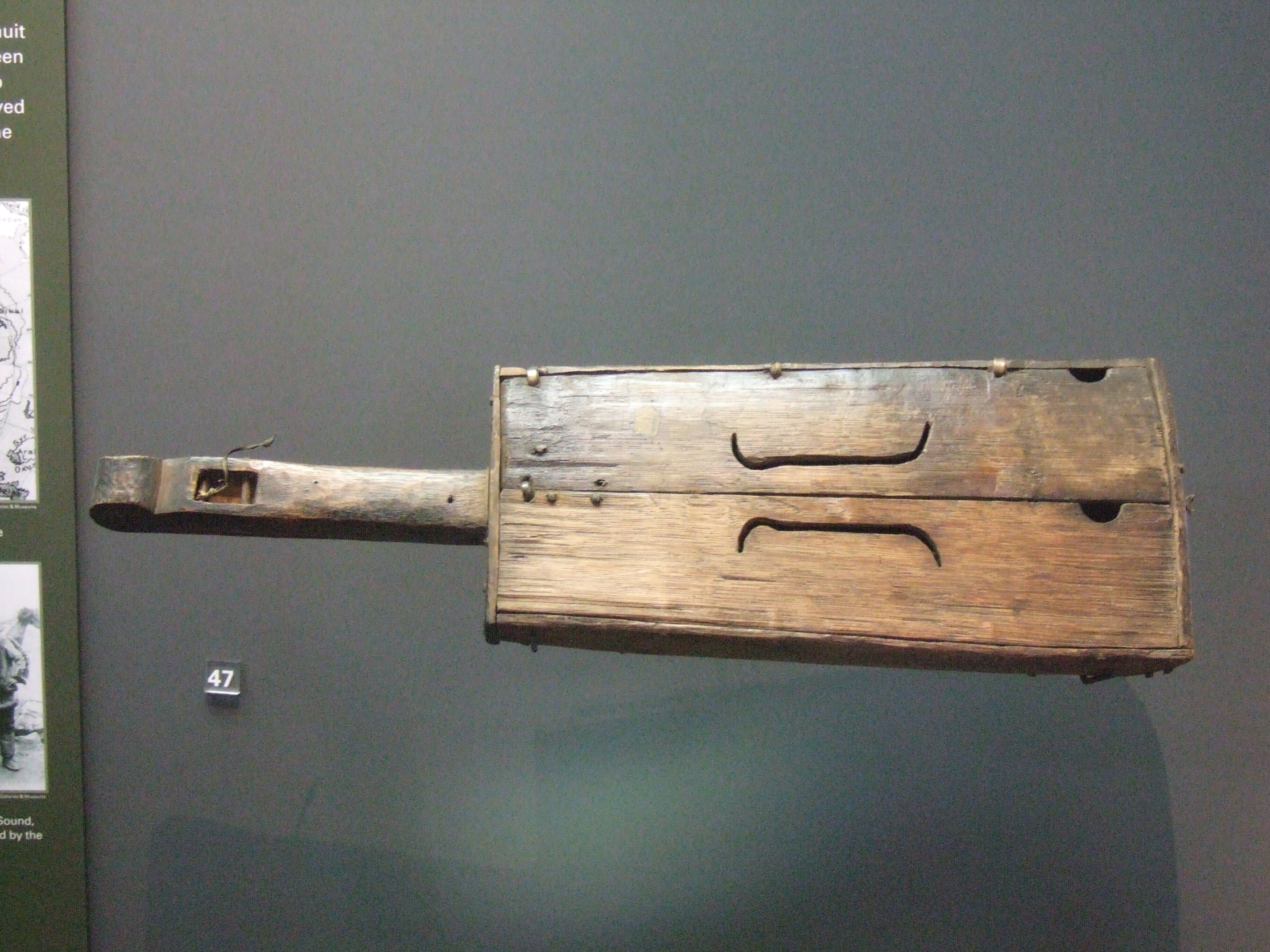
Agiarut from Alaska

There is another stringed instrument, the agiarut which is known as the European fiddle.

The qelutviaq or kelutviaq is a one-string fiddle or lute played by the Yup'ik of Nelson Island and southwest Alaska

== Distribution ==
The Canadian Broadcasting Corporation has been broadcasting music in Inuit communities since 1961, when CFFB was opened in Frobisher Bay, Northwest Territories (modern day Iqaluit, Nunavut). The CBC Northern Service played a critical role in the distribution and promotion of Inuit music; as an essential cultural link between the remote communities of the Canadian Arctic, it often served as the only venue for Arctic-based musicians to record a song or an album.

In 2016, the Nunavut-based band The Jerry Cans launched Aakuluk Music, the first Nunavut-based independent record label.

== Notable performers ==
- Susan Aglukark
- Beatrice Deer
- Kelly Fraser
- Aasiva
- Joshua Haulli
- Hyper-T
- Lucie Idlout
- Elisapie
- The Jerry Cans
- Simeonie Keenainak
- Qaunaq Mikkigak
- Northern Haze
- Nuuk Posse
- Charlie Panigoniak
- Quantum Tangle
- Tumasi Quissa
- Riit
- Silla + Rise
- Sugluk
- Tanya Tagaq
- Willie Thrasher
- Tudjaat
- Alacie Tullaugaq

== See also ==
- Yupʼik dance
