= Artcirq =

Canadian circus group

Artcirq is an Inuit circus performance collective based in Igloolik, Nunavut, Canada. It was co-founded in 1998 by Guillaume Saladin and several circus artists from Montreal and youth from Igloolik, with the financial support of Igloolik Isuma Productions, Canada's first Inuit independent production company and Cirque Éloize. Its activities provide Inuit youth with a vehicle for creative expression that maintains strong links to Inuit traditions and performance styles.

Artcirq members blend techniques of modern circus arts such as acrobatics, juggling, and clowning with traditional Inuit cultural practices including Inuit traditional games, throat singing, and drum dancing to create meaningful and original work through performing arts, music, and video. Notable performers with the troupe have included singer-songwriter Terry Uyarak.

Artcirq has been invited to perform across the globe from Mexico to Greece to Timbuktu, including the 2010 Vancouver Winter Olympic Games Opening Ceremony and Queen Elizabeth's Diamond Jubilee pageant in Windsor Castle. The collective has produced numerous short films as well as three albums: Artcirq Jam, Made In Igloolik, and Kikkukia. The documentary film Circus Without Borders, produced by Northern Light Productions, features Artcirq's story.

More recently, Artcirq members have been coordinating an extra-curricular community arts program for youth at its Black Box studio in Igloolik. It is through these projects that Artcirq enables Inuit artists to express and redefine themselves together in their changing world.
