= Up Here (magazine) =

Canadian magazine

- Categories: Regional lifestyle magazine
- Frequency: 6 per year
- Publisher: Sherry Rioux and Brianna Freitag
- First issue: December 1984
- Company: Up Here Publishing
- Country: Canada
- Based in: Yellowknife, Northwest Territories
- Language: English
- Website: www.uphere.ca
- ISSN: 0828-4253

Up Here is a magazine that is published six times a year, headquartered in Yellowknife, Northwest Territories, Canada.

== History and profile ==
The magazine was first published in December 1984 by co-founders Marion Lavigne and Ronne Heming. They head Up Here Publishing Ltd. The magazine's first editor was Eric Watt, and past editors includes Aaron Spitzer, Tim Querengesser, Eva Holland, Katharine Sandiford, Cooper Langford, Tristin Hopper, Samia Madwar, Tim Edwards, Herb Mathisen, Elaine Anselmi, and Jacob Boon, among many others. Rod Raycroft was the art director for the first 26 issues. John Pekelsky served as art director for many years but left the publication in 2020. John Allerston provided layout and illustration for the publications in the early years.

The readership is about 100,000 readers per issue, according to the publishers. Up Here was offered for many years as an in-flight magazine on Canadian North, an airline serving Canada's North. That caused the magazine some problems with its July/August 2006 issue, which had a cover story on naked hiking. The cover image showed a naked hiker from behind, with type covering his buttocks. After a passenger on Canadian North complained, the magazine had to spend $5,000 on short notice to create a new cover for the airline depicting a fish in order to keep its promise of seat-pocket distribution to its advertisers. In 2019 the editors recalled that issues as Up Here's costliest.

In 2012 the magazine was published eight times a year. In January 2015 Up Here absorbed its sister magazine, Up Here Business. Up Here Business returned as a quarterly magazine in 2018.

In April 2024, the magazine was purchased by Whitehorse-based North of Ordinary Media.

In December 2024, the magazine was purchased by long standing employees Sherry Rioux and Brianna Freitag. It is now NWT-based once again but the team has reiterated their commitment to bringing stories from all three territories.

== Focus ==
The magazine exclusively features articles on northern Canada, including the territories north of the 60th parallel, Yukon, NWT and Nunavut, as well as areas in Canada's provinces that are northern and remote, like Atlin, British Columbia, Nunavik in northern Quebec and Nunatsiavut in northern Labrador. Its articles are in the genre of creative non-fiction, and cover social, political, historical, aboriginal, travel and geographical details of Canada's North.

Up Here also covers cultural events in the region, including reviews of Inuktitut music by performers like The Jerry Cans, Riit, and Becky Han.

== Awards and recognition ==
Up Here and its publishers and writers have won several awards. In 2010, Up Here was awarded the prestigious Magazine of the Year honours from the National Magazine Awards, as well as its written articles receiving six honourable mentions. In 2004, Lavigne was awarded the Lifetime Achievement award by the Western Magazine Awards. That same year, then-editor Aaron Spitzer was awarded the Best Article, NWT/Alberta Western Magazine Award for his story, "The Shadow in the Valley." In 2002, former editor Cooper Langford won the Western Magazine Profile Award for his story, "The Fast Runner." In 2014, Up Here was awarded Magazine of the Year at the Western Magazine Awards." In 2019, Up Here was awarded Magazine of the Year: Special Interest at the National Magazine Awards.
