= Eider Islands =

Set of uninhabited islands in the Canadian Arctic

- Location within Nunavut Location within Canada

Geography
- Location: Ungava Bay
- Coordinates: 60.872°N 69.323°W
- Archipelago: Arctic Archipelago
- Area: 95 km^{2} (37 sq mi)

Administration
- Canada
- Nunavut: Nunavut
- Region: Qikiqtaaluk

Demographics
- Population: Uninhabited

The Eider Islands are an uninhabited Canadian Arctic islands group in the Qikiqtaaluk Region of Nunavut, Canada. The 172 small islands are located in western Ungava Bay off the northern coast of Quebec. The closest community is Quaqtaq, Quebec, 20 km (12 mi) to the northwest.

They should not be confused with Eider Island, which lies in Chesterfield Inlet, Nunavut, just southeast of Little Big Island.

== Geography ==
The underlying solid rock of these islands is a granitic gneiss. There are wide, bare rock shorelines formed by high tides of up to 16 m (52 ft).

== Flora ==
A thin soil layer supports Arctic willow, crowberry, sedge, lichen and moss.

== Fauna ==
The Eider Islands are a Canadian Important Bird Area (#NU026). The notable bird species is the common eider.
