= Taqqut Productions =

Canadian film and television production company

- Type: Private
- Industry: Film television
- Founded: 2011
- Headquarters: Iqaluit, Nunavut, Canada
- Website: taqqut.com

Taqqut Productions (Inuktitut: ᑕᖅᑯᑦ ᑕᑯᓐᓇᕋᒃᓴᓕᐅᖅᑎᒃᑯᑦ) is an Inuit-owned film production company founded in 2011 by Louise Flaherty, Neil Christopher, and Daniel (Danny) Christopher. It is headquartered in Iqaluit, Nunavut, Canada.

== Background ==
Taqqut is a creator and producer of film and television projects. It also provides project production services including web design, marketing and technical writing. Taqqut Productions is Inuit-owned and has a mandate of bringing stories of the North to the world through the voices of people from the North.

=== Etymology ===
The name taqqut comes from an Inuktitut word. For hundreds of years Inuit used a tool called a taqqut to fan the flames of their qulliq, the stone lamps that burn oil from rendered animal fat. This tool, the taqqut, would become blackened with soot after fanning flames and could then be used to draw images and tell stories.

== Productions ==
=== Television ===
==== Anaana's Tent ====
Anaana's Tent is a children's television show targeted toward 2 to 5 year-olds. It is filmed in both Inuktitut and English, but has an emphasis on teaching children the Inuktitut language. It is hosted by Rita Claire Mike-Murphy and consists of different segments including live action, puppets, and animated segments. Taqqut Productions announced via Twitter on 11 March 2019 that they were working on a second season of the show.

=== Digital/Webseries ===
==== Arctic Horror Stories ====
In 2018 the Canada Media Fund announced that the Taqqut Productions project Arctic Horror Stories, produced in partnership with Colombia's Conexion Creativa, would recited $59,560 in funding. This funding comes from a Canada-Columbia Codevelopment Incentive.

=== Film ===
Taqqut has produced a number of short animated films, including:

- Amaqqut Nunat: The Country of Wolves (2011)
- The Orphan and the Polar Bear (2013)
- The Amautalik (2014)
- Ogress of the Gravelbank (2015)
- Little Fold of the Arctic (2015)
- The Owl and the Lemming (2016)
- Ukaliq and Kalla Go Fishing (2017)
- Giant Bear (2018)
- What's My Superpower? (2019)
- How Nivi Got Her Names (2019)
- Haunted Blizzard (2019)
- Angakuksajaujuq: The Shaman’s Apprentice (2021)
- Arctic Song (2021)
- Isunngannguaq (2025)
- Mangittatuarjuk - The Gnawer of Rocks (2025)
- Lemming's First Christmas (2026)

=== Awards ===
Taqqut has received the following awards:

Mangittatuarjuk - The Gnawer of Rocks (2025):

- Best Animated Short Film at Silver Wave Film Festival 2025
- Best Animated Short Film at Dublin International Film Festival 2026
- Best Canadian Short at TAAFI - Toronto Animation Arts Festival International 2026
- Best Short Film at Seattle International Film Festival 2026
- The Moon Jury Award at imagineNATIVE Film + Media Arts Festival 2026
