= Anaana's Tent =

- Directed by: Nadia Mike; Roselynn Akulukjuk; Neil Christopher; Philip Eddolls; Daniel Christopher; Patrick Béland
- Presented by: Rita Claire Mike-Murphy
- Opening theme: "We're Headed to Anaana's Tent" performed by The Jerry Cans
- Country of origin: Canada
- Original languages: Inuktitut; English
- No. of seasons: 2
- No. of episodes: 26

Production
- Executive producers: Louise Flaherty; Neil Christopher; Daniel Christopher
- Producer: Neil Christopher
- Running time: 22–23 minutes
- Production company: Taqqut Productions

Original release
- Network: Aboriginal Peoples Television Network
- Release: May 12, 2018 – present

Anaana's Tent (Inuktitut: ᐊᓈᓇᐅᑉ ᑐᐱᖕᒐ, Anaanaup Tupinga) is a Canadian pre-school children's television show created by Taqqut Productions in 2018. It airs in Canada on APTN in both Inuktitut and English. It is hosted by Rita Claire Mike-Murphy along with her puppet husky sidekick Qimmiq.

== Format ==
Each episode is approximately 22 minutes long and features a combination of live-action, puppet and animated sequences. These segments contain a variety of content, including songs, stories and educational sketches. Each of the elements in an episode focus on the title theme.

== Characters ==
- Rita Claire is spending the summer at her anaana's tent with her husky, Qimmiq. While Anaana is out on the land, Rita Claire stays in her tent and plays games, sings songs, reads stories, and learns new words in Inuktitut. Rita Claire's full name is Rita Claire Mike-Murphy, who also sings under the name Riit.
- Qimmiq is Rita Claire's husky. He is a retired sled dog. Qimmiq can be grumpy sometimes, but when he is in a good mood, he can be fun and helpful. He helps Rita Claire to count, sort, and learn new words.

=== Recurring characters ===
- Ukaliq is an Arctic hare with a lot of energy. He loves to play and learn about the world around him, but he's a little impatient. Sometimes he doesn't think things through. He's always up for an adventure around town and out on the land with his pal Kalla. Kalla and Ukaliq most commonly appear in segments in which they help a narrator list works that begin with one of the sounds in the Inuktitut language. Ukaliq is voiced by Vinnie Karetak.
- Kalla is a wise and calm little lemming. Kalla is patient and thoughtful like many traditional hunters who live in the Arctic. He is a good friend to Ukaliq. When they go on adventures, Kalla teaches Ukaliq traditional skills and reminds him to stay calm. Kalla and Ukaliq most commonly appear in segments in which they help a narrator list works that begin with one of the sounds in the Inuktitut language. Kalla is voiced by Anguti Johnston.
- Uliaq is an animated character who loves animals and wants to share everything he knows about them with his friends. He hosts a segment titled “Uliaq's Amazing Animals” in which he discusses a specific arctic animal, teaching viewers about it.
- Nanuq is a big polar bear who know what it means to be a good friend. Nanuq likes to stay active by playing hockey and often has to find creative ways to cheer up his little brother Nuka. He and Nuka appear in the segments "Nanuq and Nuka".
- Nuka is a little polar bear with a grumpy exterior but, deep down, he just wants to have fun with his friends. Nuka is a persistent bear who doesn't give up when he sets his mind to something. He and Nanuq appear in the segments "Nanuq and Nuka".

== Episodes ==
=== Season 1 (2018) ===
| No. | Title | Inuktitut air date | English air date |
|---|---|---|---|
| 1 | "Fishing" | May 12, 2018 | September 15, 2018 |
Host Rita Claire arrives at her family's tent and learns how important fishing is in Inuit culture. Celina Kalluk stops by to sing a song, and they read the book Fishing with Grandma.
| 2 | "Dogs" | May 19, 2018 | September 22, 2018 |
Rita Claire explains the importance of dogs to Inuit culture. Celina Kalluk and Rita Claire demonstrate a throat song called “The River,” and Rita Claire reads the book Siku and Kamik Go to School.
| 3 | "Going on a Trip" | May 26, 2018 | September 29, 2018 |
Rita Claire and Qimmiq are getting ready to go for a hike, and she shows how to prepare for a trip. Beatrice Deer teaches us how to count to five in Inuktitut. We hear the Inuit tale of the owl and the lemming and read the book On the Shoulder of a Giant.
| 4 | "Parts of the Body" | June 2, 2018 | October 10, 2018 |
Rita Claire teaches Qimmiq about parts of the body, eating right and brushing his teeth. Looee Arreak sings “Inuktitut Uqausira” and they read the book My Tooth Hurts.
| 5 | "Inuit Clothing" | June 9, 2018 | October 13, 2018 |
Rita Claire teaches viewers about the importance of Inuit clothing and how it protects against the cold. Rita Claire and Celina Kalluk perform a throat song together, and they read the book Viivi's New Kamiks.
| 6 | "Arctic Plants" | June 16, 2018 | October 20, 2018 |
Rita Claire and Qimmiq learn all about Arctic plants. Meeka Arnakaq sings the Butterfly song, Zipporah Kalluk teaches how to light a qulliq (an Inuit stone lamp), and they read the book Saila and Betty.
| 7 | "Arctic Bugs" | June 23, 2018 | October 27, 2018 |
Rita Claire talks about common Arctic bugs, like mosquitoes and wolf spiders. They tell a traditional Inuit story about an orphan and the amautalik, and they read the book Grandmother Ptarmigan.
| 8 | "Counting" | June 30, 2018 | November 3, 2018 |
Rita Claire teaches how to count to five by counting items in the tent. Beatrice Deer visits the qarmmaq to sing the juggling song, and they read the book Out on the Ice and count fish.
| 9 | "Birthday Party" | July 7, 2018 | November 10, 2018 |
Rita Claire is invited to a friend's birthday party, but her friend has an unusual request. Celina Kalluk plays the mouth harp, and they read the book Leah's Mustache Party.
| 10 | "Sorting" | July 14, 2018 | November 17, 2018 |
Rita Claire and Qimmiq show how to sort different items in the tent. Meeka Arnakaq teaches viewers how to play Inugaq, a bone game, and they read the book Going to Grandma's.
| 11 | "Helping Out" | July 21, 2018 | November 24, 2018 |
Rita Claire talks about the different ways we help family and friends. Celina Kalluk stops by to sing “Siipinnguaq,” Susan Avingaq teaches viewers how to play Makigiaq, and they read the book Why We Share Country Food.
| 12 | "Rainy Day" | July 28, 2018 | December 1, 2018 |
Rita Claire prepares for a rainy day outside with Qimmiq. Celina Kalluk visits to play the guitar and sing, and viewers are introduced to the traditional story The Legend of Lightning and Thunder.
| 13 | "Going Home" | August 4, 2018 | December 8, 2018 |
It's Rita Claire's last day in the tent, and she feels sad. So she sings to Qimmiq to cheer herself up, and reads the book Way Back Then, featuring different Inuit folk tales and myths.

Each episode is credited to all directors Nadia Mike, Roselynn Akulujuk, Neil Christopher, Philip Eddolls, Danny Christopher and Patrick Béland.

Each episode is credited to the same writers; head writer Neil Christopher and writers Nadia Mike, Roselynn Akulukjuk, Danny Christopher, William Flaherty, Maren Vsetula, Champagne Brittany Choquer, Philip Eddolls and Martha Grant.

=== Season 2 (2020) ===
| No. | Title | Inuktitut air date | English air date |
|---|---|---|---|
| 1 | "Welcome Back" | February 15, 2020 | May 17, 2020 |
Rita Claire sings and learns about drum dancing from Chad and Emerald.
| 2 | "Healthy Living" | February 22, 2020 | May 24, 2020 |
Rita Claire explains the significance of healthy living habits like eating properly and exercising.
| 3 | "Colours" | February 29, 2020 | May 31, 2020 |
Rita Claire tries to decide her favorite color but Qimmiq isn't helping. It is shown how to say different colors in Inuktitut. Reflections with Mia and the Monsters are discussed. Susan Aglukark sings. Rita Claire reads the book "What am I?"
| 4 | "Families" | March 14, 2020 | June 7, 2020 |
Rita Claire shows pictures of her family; Sissi gets a new sibling, and Uliaq talks about Arctic Hares. We read the book Grandma, How Do I Light the Qulliq?
| 5 | "Summertime" | March 7, 2020 | June 14, 2020 |
Rita Claire talks about her favourite summertime activities. Looee Arreak stops by to sing a song, Meeka explains why it's so important to keep your teeth healthy, and Kathleen Merritt and Rita Claire perform a throat song together.
| 6 | "Opposites" | March 21, 2020 | June 21, 2020 |
Rita Claire and Qimmiq learn all about opposites. Meanwhile, Tuka is nervous about his first day at school, and Nanuq and Nuka have some trouble waking up in the morning.
| 7 | "Country Food" | March 28, 2020 | June 28, 2020 |
Rita Claire loves talking about Country Food, like caribou, seal, and char. But her favourite is maktaaq. Ukaliq and Kalla join in the fun and Nanuq and Nuka clean up a campsite. Rita Claire reads the book "Grandma, What's an Ulu For?"
| 8 | "Sharing" | April 4, 2020 | November 3, 2018 |
Rita Claire loves sharing and thinks that berries are the best snack to share. The siksiks pop out of their home to sing a song, Chad explains how to play a Ualinirmiut drum, and the book "Going Fishing" is read.
| 9 | "Berry Picking" | November 2020 | July 5, 2020 |
Rita Claire talks about how she loves to go berry picking in the fall. How to do an arm pull; about the "Na" sound from Ukaliq and Kalla; a surprise visit from Northern Haze; and the book "A Walk on the Tundra."
| 10 | "Patterns" | April 18, 2020 | July 12, 2020 |
Rita Claire looks for patterns in the tent; Nanuq and Nuka play hockey with their friends; and Uliaq talks about bowhead whales. Also, the book "Grandpa, How Do I Build and Iglu?"
| 11 | "Clam Digging" | April 25, 2020 | July 19, 2020 |
Rita Claire talks about one of her favorite activities; clam digging. Meeka teaches her classmates how to protect themselves against germs. Ukaliq and Kalla learn words that start with the 'Qi' sound. The Inuit game, Back Push, is featured.
| 12 | "Friends" | May 2, 2020 | July 26, 2020 |
Rita Claire receives some special gifts from her friends back home. Kathleen Merritt drops by to sing Imakali. Nanuq and Nuka learn how to wear kamiik. Also, how to light a qulliq. Rita Claire reads the story "Kamik Joins the Pack."
| 13 | "Going Home, Again" | May 9, 2020 | August 2, 2020 |
It's Rita Claire's last day in the tent, and she feels sad but there's still time to have some fun! Listen to the traditional story of the Orphan and the Qallupilluit, learn to take care of a snowmobile, and enjoy Jennifer Soucie singing Imutamu.

Each episode is credited to all directors Roselynn Akulukjuk, Anguti Johnston, Mark Aspland, Neil Christopher and Daniel Christopher.

Each episode is credited to the same writers; head writer Neil Christopher and writers Nadia Mike, Nadia Sammurtok, Neil Christopher, Bronwyn Szabo, Ali Hinch, Philip Eddolls and Amelia Spedaliere.

== Release ==
The first season was aired on APTN. The season ran in Inuktitut starting May 12, 2018. It was then aired on APTN in English starting September 15, 2018. All episodes are currently available to watch in both languages on the APTN kids website.

The second season originally aired on APTN. The season began in Inuktitut starting February 15, 2020. It was then aired on APTN in English starting May 17, 2020.

As of 2020, the show is available for streaming in Canada on APTN Lumi, CBC Gem and IsumaTV.

The characters of Ukaliq and Kalla have also been spun off into their own animated series, Ukaliq and Kalla.
