= Madeleine Allakariallak =

Canadian musical artist and journalist

- Born: Resolute, Nunavut, Canada
- Occupations: Musician, TV host
- Instrument: Inuit throat singing

Madeleine Allakariallak (born Resolute, Nunavut) is a Canadian Inuk musician and television journalist. Formerly a member of the Inuit throat singing duo Tudjaat, from 2005 to 2007 she was also the host of the weekly newsmagazine series APTN National News Contact on the Aboriginal Peoples Television Network.

Phoebe Atagotaaluk, Allakariallak's bandmate in Tudjaat, is her cousin. Her husband, Romeyn Stevenson, is a current member of the Iqaluit City Council.

== See also ==
- Music of Canada
- Aboriginal music of Canada
- List of Canadian musicians
