= Veronica Johnny =

- Born: February 25, 1969 (age 57)
- Origin: Fort Smith, Northwest Territories, Canada
- Genres: Rock, World
- Occupations: musician, arts educator
- Years active: 1997-present
- Label: independent
- Website: thejohnnys.com

Veronica Johnny is a Canadian musician, entrepreneur and educator, from Fort Smith, Northwest Territories, in Treaty 8 Territory. She divides her time between Toronto and Northern Ontario, Canada.

== Biography ==
Veronica is of partial First Nations (Cree-Métis) descent. Her solo performances blend Indigenous hand drumming, acoustic guitar and hard rock music. In addition to performing, she is also an engineer, event organizer, and producer. She also facilitates workshops in music-business development, marketing, bios/press kits, songwriting, hand drumming, Indigenous culture and art projects.

In 2015 Johnny founded IndigenEd, an Indigenous arts education business focused on creating understanding, and developing approaches for improved wellness. IndigenEd offers in-person and virtual events, workshops, speeches, and art and culture-focused activities.

Johnny is a Cree language student and advocate and has worked on several Cree-language projects, including producing an all-Cree song, "Nisakihtan Kiya Kisoskatowin", which was released through a project with the NWT Metis Nation.

=== The Johnnys ===
Established in 2002, The Johnnys are a hard rock band led by co-founders Veronica Johnny (vocals, management) and Dave Johnny (drums), the group's songwriters and only constant members. Though inspired mainly by '70s rock, The Johnnys' irreverence, punkish edge and Indigenous-influenced lyrics distance them from both classic and contemporary rock scenes.

The band has released four self-produced records, which have launched several charting singles. The Johnnys have performed in the U.S. and across Canada, been featured on TV and film, and shared stages with musicians including Geordie Johnson, Bif Naked, Stevie Salas, Keith Secola and Crystal Shawanda.

== Discography ==
=== With The Johnnys ===
- I Like It A Lot (2007, independent)
- Louder Faster More Fun (2010, independent)
- ROCK (2013, independent)
- Nisakihtan Kiya Kisoskatowin single (2015, independent)
- Your Girl single (2020, independent)
- Leathers and Feathers (2020, independent)
- Leathers and Feathers (Salas/Gutierrez Remix) (2021, independent)
- Frog in a Pot (Salas/Gutierrez Remix) (2022, independent)
- Butterfly (Salas/Gutierrez Remix) (2022, independent)

=== Compilations ===
- Warrior Songs (2007, Spirit Magazine)
- Idle No More: Songs for Life Vol. 1 (2013, RPM FM)
- Nehiyaw Nikamonak: Oyoyowin ohci Nanaskomowin (Cree Songs: Howls from Gratitude) (2015, NWT Cree Language Program)
