= Agiarut =

Inuit bowed musical instrument

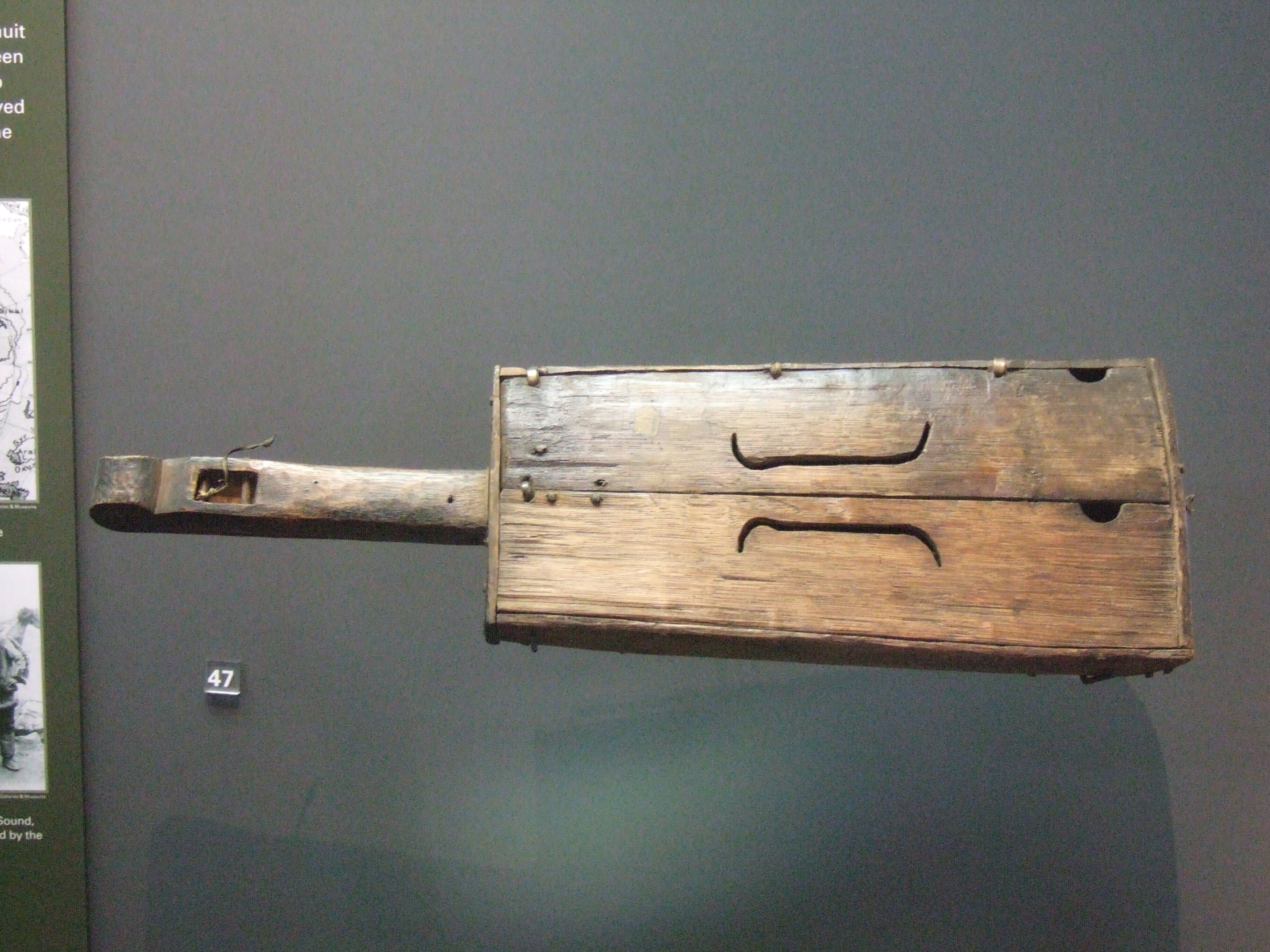
19th century Agiarut from Alaska, in the McManus Galleries, Dundee, Scotland, though this example is missing its bow.

The agiarut (Inuktitut syllabics: ᐊᒋᐊᕈᑦ also known as the European fiddle) is a bowed instrument native to the Inuit culture of Canada and Alaska.

According to musicologist Beverley Cavanagh, agiarut is the name for a European fiddle, while tautirut is the name for the indigenous bowed box zither. The modern Western fiddle may be referred to as agiaq ("shaman's rubbing stone").
