= Hyper-T =

Canadian Inuk rapper

Hyper-T is the stage name of Adam Tanuyak, a Canadian rapper from Chesterfield Inlet, Nunavut whose music blends Inuit music traditions with hip hop. Tanuyak, who struggled with depression in his early teens, began releasing rap singles in 2014. By 2018, he had released seven singles, was working on his debut full-length album, and had songs featured in the soundtracks to the films Iqaluit and The Grizzlies. In addition to studying music production, he has also studied public governance at Carleton University's Nunavut Sivuniksavut program, and business management at Red River College. He won the Canadian Screen Award for Best Original Song for "The Trials", a song from The Grizzlies cowritten with Thomas Lambe and Dan "DJ Shub" General, at the 7th Canadian Screen Awards in 2019.
