= Terry Uyarak =

Inuk singer-songwriter

Terry Uyarak is an Inuk singer-songwriter from Igloolik, Nunavut, Canada, whose debut album Nunarjua Isulinginniani was released in 2020.

Prior to launching his musical career, Uyarak was a performer and artistic director with Artcirq, an Inuit circus troupe.

Nunarjua Isulinginniani, whose title translates as "before the world ends", was produced by Jace Lasek, and was released in October 2020 on Aakuluk Music. The album was preceded by the preview singles "Inuit Nunangat" and "Anuri"; the latter was a duet with Riit, and the former received national airplay on CBC Music and charted on the CBC Music Top 20. The album received a Juno Award nomination for Indigenous Music Album of the Year at the Juno Awards of 2021.

Uyarak followed up in 2023 with the album Unnuaq.
