= Becky Han =

Inuk singer and songwriter

- Origin: Arctic Bay, Nunavut
- Genres: Acoustic Inuktitut music
- Occupation(s): Singer, songwriter
- Years active: 2006-present

Becky Han is an Inuk Canadian singer and songwriter, noted for composing original acoustic music in Inuktitut.

== Life and career ==
Han is originally from Arctic Bay, Nunavut. She first posted videos online as a way to continue sharing her music with her parents after she moved from Nunavut to Brandon, Manitoba, which led to a substantial online following. Han has discussed two motivations for writing and sharing original music in her native language of Inuktitut: to help keep the language alive, and to feel closer to the community she grew up in. Han has built her music career while also working as a stay-at-home mother.

Han won both first and second place in the Nunavut Department of Culture and Heritage's 2016 Qilaut Inuktut children's songwriting contest. One of her songs, "786", won first place, and another of her songs, "Qaariaq", won second place; both songs were co-written with her sister, Tracy May. Han and May's song "6-muaqpat" won second place in the 2019 Qilaut contest, and their song "Piqannarijaq" won fifth place that year. Han had previously placed eighth in the 2015 contest with a song that she co-wrote with Melissa Reid.

In March 2017, Han opened for Tanya Tagaq in Winnipeg during Tagaq's tour. In a 2017 BBC broadcast in which Tagaq played an hour of her favourite music, she included Han's single "Guutiga" among the 15 tracks she selected.

Also in 2017, Han's single "786" was featured by Up Here Magazine in a Nunavut Music Week list of Inuktitut music.

In 2018, Han won first place in the Qikiqtani Inuit Association's contest for the best original song or poem in Inuktitut. The title of Han's winning entry was "Nagligigakkit" (which translates to "because I love you"). She placed third in the 2019 QIA contest.

In 2021, Han published The Bee, a picture book based on her award-winning song "Qaariaq".

== Selected awards ==
- 2nd place, Qilaut Inuktut songwriting contest, Government of Nunavut (2019)
- 3rd place, Inuktitut song/poem contest, Qikiqtani Inuit Association (2019)
- 1st place, Inuktitut song/poem contest, Qikiqtani Inuit Association (2018)
- 1st and 2nd place, Qilaut Inuktut songwriting contest, Government of Nunavut (2016)
