= Beatrice Deer =

Canadian Inuk-Mohawk singer and actress (born 1985)

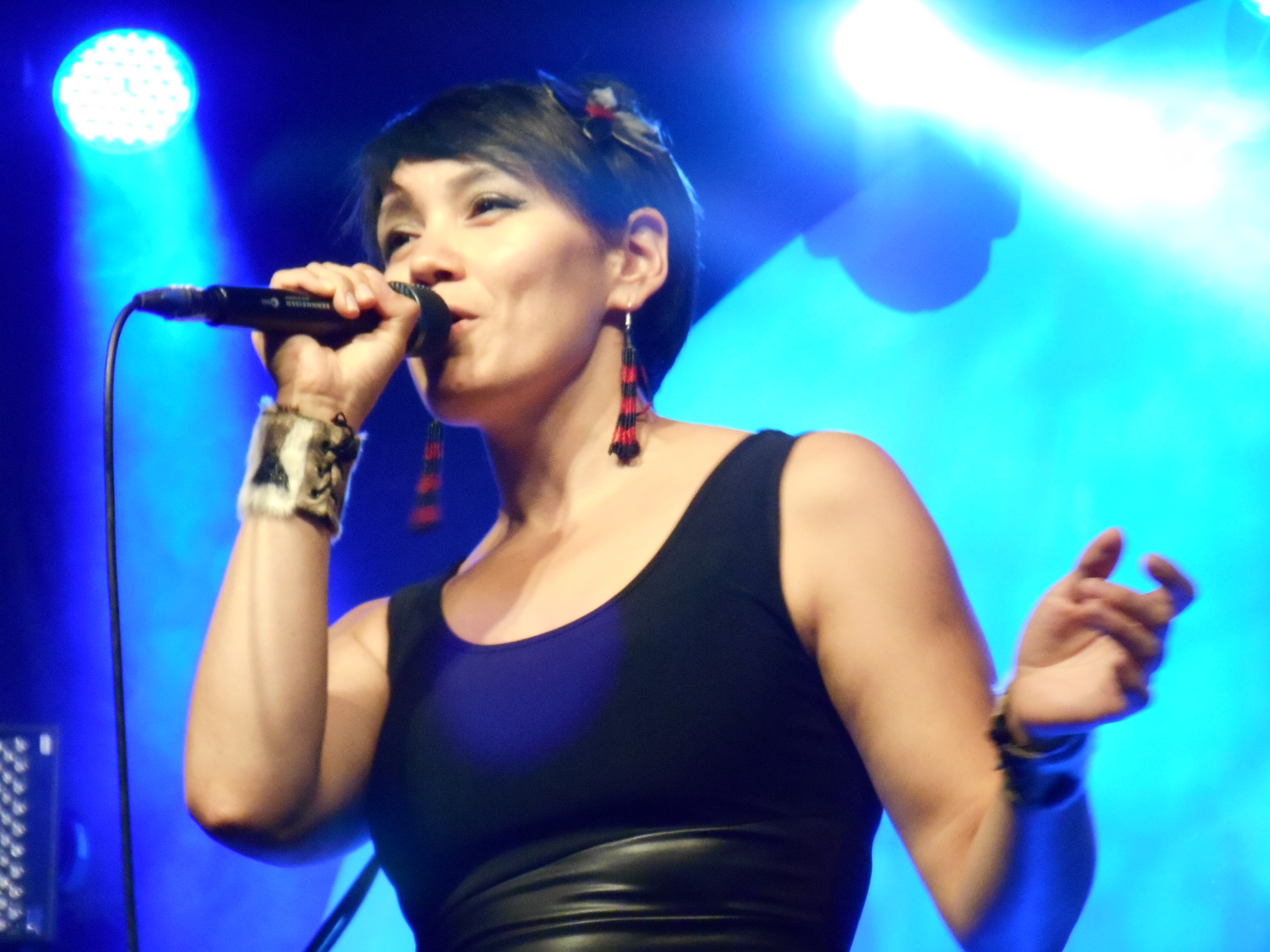
- Born: 1985 (age 40–41); Quaqtaq, Nunavik, Canada
- Style: Folk, Pop music, rock
- Website: www.beatricedeerband.com

Beatrice Deer (born 1985) is a Canadian Inuk-Mohawk singer and actress from Quaqtaq, Nunavik, Quebec. She released her debut album, Just Bea, in 2005, and won a Canadian Aboriginal Music Award for Best Inuit/Cultural Album. In 2010, she released her self-titled album, Beatrice Deer, and later that same year, she released a Christmas album, An Arctic Christmas. Her album, SHIFTING, was released in 2021.

Deer's newest album, Inuit Legend, is set to be released on April 3, 2026.

== Biography ==
Deer was born in Quaqtaq, to an Inuk mother and a Mohawk father from Kahnawake. She is the cousin of Jaaji of the band Twin Flames.

Beatrice Deer performs throughout the north with her band.

== Awards ==
- Best Inuit/Cultural Album at the Canadian Aboriginal Music Award
- 2021: laureate at the Canadian Indigenous Music Awards.

She was a Felix Award nominee for Indigenous Artist of the Year at the 44th Félix Awards in 2022.

== Discography ==
- Just Bea (2005)

No.	Title	Length
1.	"True Angel"	3:22
2.	"My Friends"	2:35
3.	"Live With It"	2:59
4.	"Ilangani"	2:31
5.	"Do I"	4:10
6.	"Life in the North"	3:50
7.	"Sad Song"	5:12
8.	"Nalligivagit"	5:35
9.	"Nalligivagit (Remix)"	5:21

- Beatrice Deer (2010)

No.	Title	Length
1.	"Come With Me"	3:17
2.	"Missed You"	3:25
3.	"Ilaapik"	4:25
4.	"Langasivunga"	6:00
5.	"Another Chance Of Hope"	2:55
6.	"Nunaga"	4:18
7.	"Take Me As I Am"	4:17
8.	"Pride"	4:48

- Fox (2015)

No.	Title	Length
1.	"Competition (feat. Akinisie Sivuarapik)"	1:17
2.	"Painng"	3:36
3.	"Uvikkaulaukagit"	4:16
4.	"Relocation"	5:19
5.	"Katatjaniq (feat. Akinisie Sivuarapik)"	0:29
6.	"Fox (feat. Johnny Griffin)"	3:32
7.	"Pisiq (feat. Louisa Kulula)"	0:39

- My All to You (2018)

No.	Title	Length
1.	"1997"	4:02
2.	"Takugiursugit"	3:24
3.	"My All To You"	5:22
4.	"Atungak"	3:13
5.	"Sapannga Sujunukua"	1:32
6.	"Isumavunga"	4:43
7.	"Immutaa"	3:31
8.	"Mali"	3:28
9.	"Qaujimagit"	4:37
10.	"You're With Me"	3:52
Total length:		37:44

- SHIFTING (2021)

No.	Title	Length
1.	"FREE"	2:47
2.	"UQAUTINNGA"	3:00
3.	"AANNGIQ"	2:06
4.	"ILINNUT-a prayer"	4:13
5.	"THE STORM"	2:50
6.	"SUNAUVVA"	3:18
7.	"CANNIBAL"	2:47
8.	"HISTORY"	3:31
9.	"MOTHER (version française)"	4:10
10.	"CHRISTMAS"	3:39
Total length:		33:00

- Innginguarutit (Little Songs) (2023)

No.	Title	Length
1.	"Kinngamiurjuiguug"	2:26
2.	"Sukkasailasami"	1:34
3.	"Airqavaakka"	2:34
4.	"Uujuq"	2:34
5.	"Timmiat"	3:25
6.	"Taakkuatakka"	2:16
7.	"Taki Taakii"	2:46
8.	"Qiturngaauja"	1:46
9.	"Qiarpali"	2:10
10.	"Uatapataannaa Uat"	1:21
11.	"Tuurngaup Inngirusinga"	2:01
12.	"Taakajai"	2:14
13.	"Qajauqatiik"	1:21
14.	"Tuttujuilluqa"	3:00
15.	"Quluppajuittuq"	2:26
Total length:		33:56
