= Quaqtaq =

Quaqtaq ᖁᐊᕐᑕᖅ
- Northern village municipality
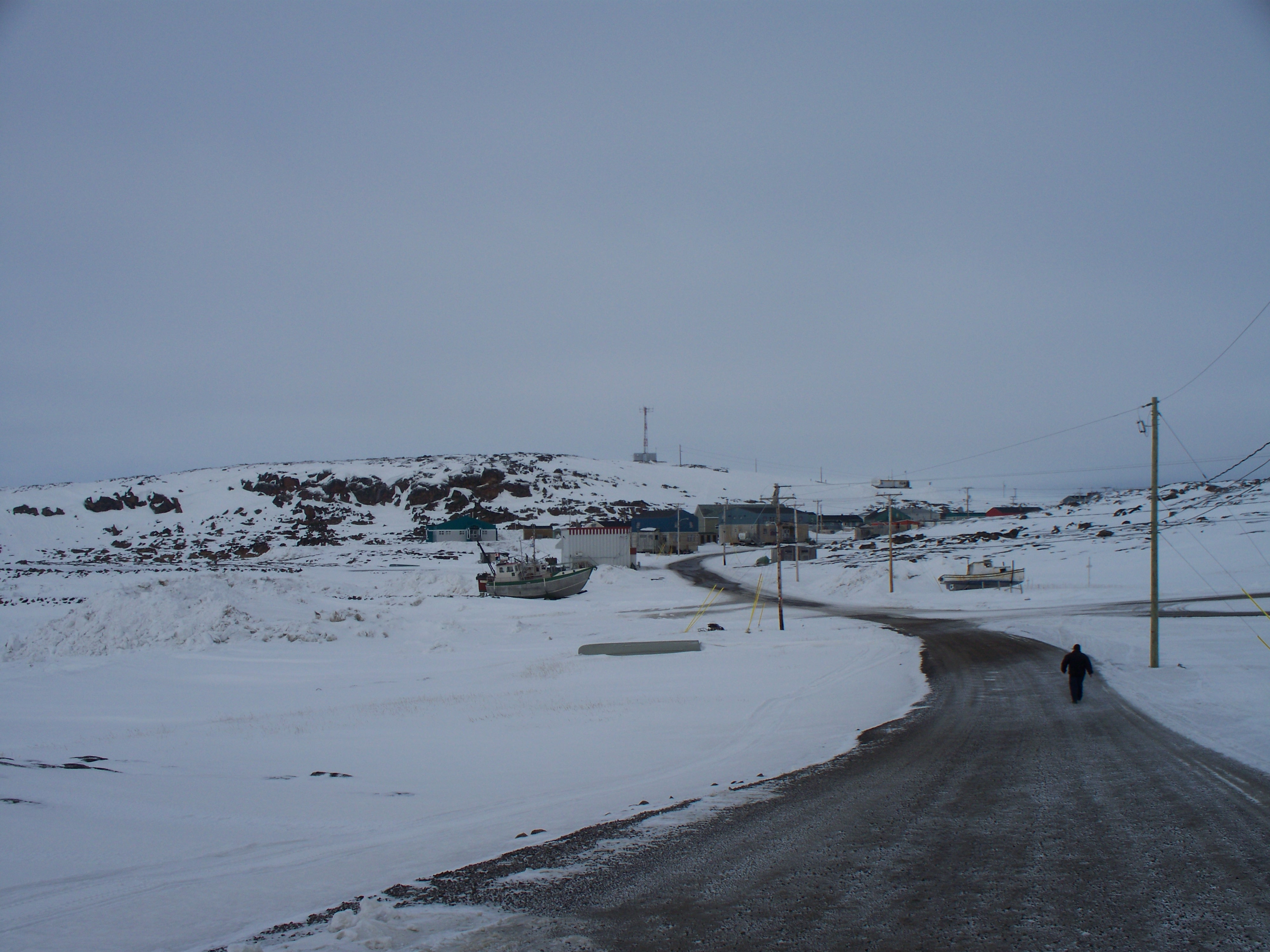

- Location within Quebec
- Coordinates: 61°02′N 69°37′W
- Country: Canada
- Province: Quebec
- Region: Nord-du-Québec
- TE: Kativik
- Constituted: November 1, 1980

Government
  - Mayor: Charlie Tukkiapik
  - Federal riding: Abitibi—Baie-James—Nunavik—Eeyou
  - Prov. riding: Ungava

Area
  - Total: 26.60 km^{2} (10.27 sq mi)
  - Land: 25.82 km^{2} (9.97 sq mi)

Population (2021)
  - Total: 453
  - Density: 17.5/km^{2} (45/sq mi)
  - Pop (2006–11): ▲12.4%
  - Dwellings: 173
- Time zone: UTC−5 (EST)
  - Summer (DST): UTC−4 (EDT)
- Postal code(s): J0M 1J0
- Area code: 819
- Website: www.nvquaqtaq.ca

Quaqtaq (Inuktitut: ᖁᐊᕐᑕᖅ) is a northern village (Inuit community) in Nunavik, northern Quebec, Canada. Its population was 453 in the Canada 2021 Census.

The village is one of the northernmost inhabited places in Quebec, located on the eastern shore of Diana Bay (Tuvaaluk in the Inuktitut language) on a peninsula which protrudes into the Hudson Strait where it meets Ungava Bay.

The name Quaqtaq signifies tapeworm. According to local folklore, this name derives from a man who once came to the area to hunt beluga and found live parasites in his feces. His hunting companions began to call the place Quaqtaq.

Inaccessible by road, Quaqtaq is served by the small Quaqtaq Airport (YQC).

== History ==
Archaeological evidence indicates that people have occupied the area around Quaqtaq for about 3500 years. Thule people, the ancestors of today's Inuit, arrived around 1400 or 1500 AD.

In 1947, a Roman Catholic mission opened in Quaqtaq. The present-day settlement was established after a trading post first established in 1927 at Iggiajaaq, a few kilometres south-west, was finally closed in 1950. After a measles epidemic killed 11 adults in 1952, the Canadian government began delivering basic services to the community. A nursing station was built in 1963. In the 1960s, the Quebec government opened a store and a post office equipped with a radio-telephone. In 1974, the store became a co-operative and, in 1978, Quaqtaq was legally established as a Northern village.

In 1996, the Kativik Regional Police Force was created in Nunavik, and became responsible for policing Quaqtaq. In 2021, the KRPF changed its name to the Nunavik Police Service.

== Climate ==
Quaqtaq is located on the coast of Ungava Bay. Due to the influence of cold currents, the temperature in Nunavik is much lower than other areas at the same latitude. The climate of Quaqtaq is a typical tundra climate (Köppen: ET), because the average temperature in the warmest months of July and August is only 6.3 °C (43.3 °F). Conversely, the hottest month in most other areas at similar latitudes is much higher. For examples Anchorage's warmest month averages 15.3 °C (59.5 °F) and Bergen's 15.6 °C (60.1 °F), whilst inland Yakutsk reaches 19.9 °C (67.8 °F).

Climate data for Quaqtaq (1951−1980 normals, extremes 1971–1987)
Month	Jan	Feb	Mar	Apr	May	Jun	Jul	Aug	Sep	Oct	Nov	Dec	Year
Record high °C (°F)	1.9 (35.4)	1.5 (34.7)	1.0 (33.8)	2.7 (36.9)	8.1 (46.6)	22.8 (73.0)	26.1 (79.0)	24.5 (76.1)	15.1 (59.2)	9.2 (48.6)	5.0 (41.0)	1.7 (35.1)	26.1 (79.0)
Mean daily maximum °C (°F)	−18.2 (−0.8)	−18.6 (−1.5)	−14.8 (5.4)	−7.0 (19.4)	−0.4 (31.3)	4.6 (40.3)	10.1 (50.2)	9.3 (48.7)	5.6 (42.1)	0.3 (32.5)	−4.6 (23.7)	−13.1 (8.4)	−3.9 (25.0)
Daily mean °C (°F)	−22.2 (−8.0)	−22.6 (−8.7)	−19.0 (−2.2)	−11.8 (10.8)	−3.4 (25.9)	1.9 (35.4)	6.2 (43.2)	6.3 (43.3)	3.3 (37.9)	−1.6 (29.1)	−7.1 (19.2)	−16.7 (1.9)	−7.2 (19.0)
Mean daily minimum °C (°F)	−26.1 (−15.0)	−26.5 (−15.7)	−23.3 (−9.9)	−16.5 (2.3)	−6.4 (20.5)	−0.8 (30.6)	2.3 (36.1)	3.2 (37.8)	1.1 (34.0)	−3.5 (25.7)	−9.6 (14.7)	−20.3 (−4.5)	−10.5 (13.1)
Record low °C (°F)	−39.4 (−38.9)	−42.8 (−45.0)	−39.7 (−39.5)	−34.0 (−29.2)	−23.9 (−11.0)	−7.8 (18.0)	−2.6 (27.3)	−3.4 (25.9)	−6.5 (20.3)	−17.0 (1.4)	−29.6 (−21.3)	−43.9 (−47.0)	−43.9 (−47.0)
Average precipitation mm (inches)	15.3 (0.60)	7.3 (0.29)	8.3 (0.33)	19.4 (0.76)	22.7 (0.89)	36.6 (1.44)	58.8 (2.31)	41.5 (1.63)	46.3 (1.82)	38.3 (1.51)	22.7 (0.89)	17.2 (0.68)	334.4 (13.17)
Average rainfall mm (inches)	0.2 (0.01)	0.1 (0.00)	0.0 (0.0)	1.1 (0.04)	3.7 (0.15)	30.0 (1.18)	57.6 (2.27)	41.9 (1.65)	49.7 (1.96)	11.3 (0.44)	0.9 (0.04)	0.5 (0.02)	197.0 (7.76)
Average snowfall cm (inches)	19.1 (7.5)	8.9 (3.5)	10.7 (4.2)	21.1 (8.3)	22.1 (8.7)	8.3 (3.3)	0.4 (0.2)	0.1 (0.0)	3.0 (1.2)	27.7 (10.9)	29.4 (11.6)	20.0 (7.9)	170.8 (67.2)
Average precipitation days (≥ 0.2 mm)	6	5	5	7	7	10	12	12	14	12	13	9	112
Average rainy days (≥ 0.2 mm)	0	0	0	0	1	7	12	12	11	2	1	0	46
Average snowy days (≥ 0.2 cm)	6	5	5	7	8	4	0	0	3	10	13	9	70
Source: ECCC

== Demographics ==
In the 2021 Census of Population conducted by Statistics Canada, Quaqtaq had a population of 453 living in 144 of its 173 total private dwellings, a change of 12.4% from its 2016 population of 403. With a land area of 25.82 km^{2} (9.97 sq mi), it had a population density of 17.5/km^{2} (45.4/sq mi) in 2021.

Population trend:

- Population in 2021: 453 (2016 to 2021 population change: 12.4%)
- Population in 2016: 403
- Population in 2011: 376
- Population in 2006: 315
- Population in 2001: 305
- Population in 1996: 257
- Population in 1981: 150

Private dwellings occupied by usual residents: 144 (total dwellings: 173)

== Education ==
The Kativik Ilisarniliriniq School Board operates the Isummasaqvik School.

== People ==
Notable people from the community include musician Beatrice Deer and disgraced Inuit police officer and aspiring musician Jaaji Okpik.
