= Alacie Tullaugaq =

Alacie Tullaugaq, ᐊᓚᓯ ᑐᓪᓚᐅᕋᖅ ᐊᒻᒪᓗ, (born April 20, 1935) is an Inuk throat singer, elder, and artist from Puvirnituq, Quebec.

== Biography ==
Tullaugaq is recognized as being one of the foremost practitioners of the Katajjak form of throat singing, performing internationally at many venues, such as the Mariposa Folk Festival. She is cited by Gregory as being one of the most respected and accomplished Katajjak singers today.

In 1998, Tullaugaq recorded an album entitled Katutjatut, along with Lucy Amarualik. The album is on the Inukshuk Records label and features Tullaugaq and Amarualik, who is also from the Puvirnituq community, performing together. It received awards, and is recognized as being an excellent example of traditional throat singing and frequently appears on recommendation lists for traditional throat singing.

Tullaugag is an elder in her community.

== Example of Work ==
Alacie Tullaugaq and Lucy Amarualik's album: Katutjatut Throat Singing on YouTube.
