= Quantum Tangle =

Canadian musical group

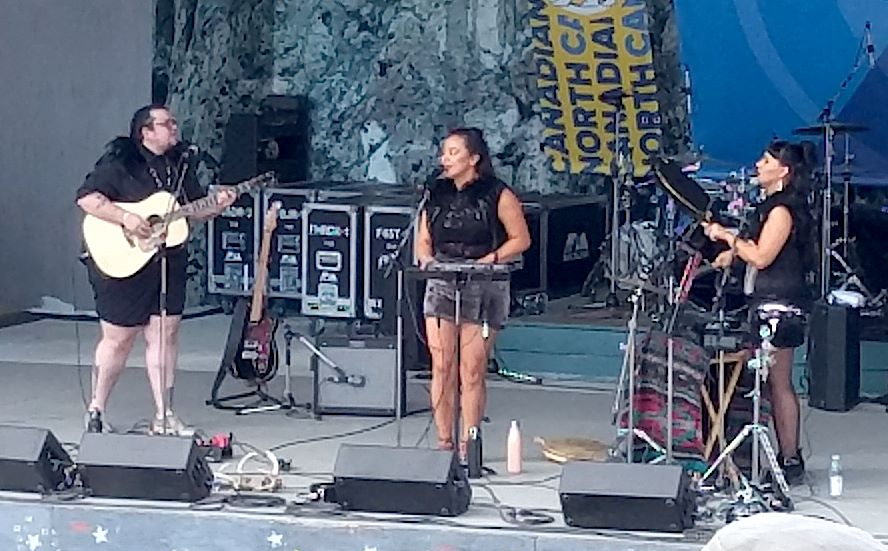
- Quantum Tangle performing at the 2018 Folk on the Rocks music festival. From left to right: Gritt, Ayalik, Mackay.

Background information
- Origin: Yellowknife, Northwest Territories, Canada
- Genres: Folk rock, blues, Inuit music, Throat singing
- Years active: 2014–present
- Members: Tiffany Ayalik; Greyson Gritt; Kayley Inuksuk Mackay

Quantum Tangle are a Juno Award-winning Canadian musical group who combine traditional Inuit throat singing and spoken word storytelling with blues-influenced folk rock, consisting of vocalist Tiffany Ayalik, Kayley Inuksuk Mackay as drummer, vocalist and throat singer, and singer and guitarist G. R. Gritt.

== History ==
Gritt and Ayalik met at the Northern Scene arts festival in Ottawa, Ontario. Formed in 2014, Quantum Tangle are based in Yellowknife, Northwest Territories. Ayalik, who is Inuk, is a native of the city, while Gritt, who is Ojibwe-Métis, was born in Sudbury, Ontario and raised in the outlying community of Warren. Gritt has lived in Yellowknife since 2009.

As a solo artist prior to the band's formation, Gritt was a regional finalist in CBC Music's Searchlight competition in 2013 and 2014. For four years, they were a mentee of Yellowknife's Northern Arts and Cultural Centre. Gritt came out as transgender in 2014, and uses gender-neutral pronouns. Ayalik also performs as a stage actress.

Quantum Tangle released their EP Tiny Hands in 2017 and their first full-length album, Shelter as we go..., in 2017. Both recordings were released on the Coax label.

Quantum Tangle won the Juno Award for Indigenous Music Album of the Year for their album Tiny Hands at the Juno Awards of 2017.

Mackay was introduced as a band member in May 2018 when the band performed at the Indigenous Music Awards. Ayalik and Mackay are sisters and also separately perform under the name PIQSIQ. They composed the soundtrack for the 2024 film Sunburnt Unicorn.

== Social justice work ==
In addition to making music, Quantum Tangle facilitates a series of school workshops and performances on the topic of Indigenous issues in Northern Canada.
