= Aasiva =

Canadian Inuk singer-songwriter (born 1997)

- Born: Colleen Aasiva Nakashuk; 1997 (age 27–28); Pangnirtung, Nunavut, Canada
- Genres: Acoustic Inuktitut music
- Occupation(s): Singer, songwriter, educator
- Instrument(s): Inuit throat singing, ukulele
- Years active: 2018–present
- Labels: Aakuluk Music
- Website: Official site

Colleen Aasiva Nakashuk (born 1997), better known by her stage name Aasiva, is a Canadian Inuk singer-songwriter and educator. Her style of indie folk music features the ukulele, Inuktitut lyrics, and Inuit throat singing.

== Life and career ==
Aasiva was born in Pangnirtung, Nunavut. Aasiva later moved to Ottawa to study at Nunavut Sivuniksavut, a program affiliated with Algonquin College.

Aasiva is represented by the record label Aakuluk Music. Under this label, she produced her first album, Aasiva, in 2018. For the album Aasiva, she was nominated in two different categories for the 2019 Indigenous Music Awards, Best Folk Album and Best New Artist, and performed at the awards ceremony. The music on this album has been described as folk, indie folk, and pop, since it combines the ukulele, Inuktitut lyrics, and Inuit throat-singing. On July 9th 2021, Aasiva released her second album, Niriunniq, which was produced by Jace Lasek of Besnard Lakes.

Multiple radio shows have produced segments that feature Aasiva's music, including CBC Radio and Indigenous in Music and Arts.

In addition to her own music, Aasiva has engaged in extensive music education efforts throughout Nunavut, which has been described in the Nunavut News as "a mission to teach ukulele to young Nunavummiut". She regularly teaches songs, the use of string instruments, and techniques like throat-singing to children in schools and festivals. She has discussed these education efforts as being part of an effort to preserve Inuit culture. This also motivates her choice to sing in Inuktitut and to use traditional Inuit musical techniques, which she has described as "a way to preserve the artform", as well as her support for bringing more musical and educational opportunities to Nunavut. Aasiva also views music as an important tool for maintaining and improving mental health, and a mechanism for coping.
