= Northern Haze =

Inuit rock band

- Origin: Igloolik, Nunavut, Canada
- Genres: Psychedelic rock, hard rock, heavy metal
- Years active: 1984–2007; 2017–present
- Label: Aakuluk Music
- Members: James Ungalaq; Derek Aqqiaruq; Allan Kangok
- Past members: Kolitalik Inukshuk; Elijah Kunnuk; John Inooya; Naisana Qamaniq

Northern Haze is a Canadian rock music group from Igloolik, Nunavut, whose self-titled 1985 debut album is believed to have been the first-ever indigenous-language rock album recorded in North America.

Formed in 1984 by Kolitalik Inukshuk, Naisana Qamaniq, James Ungalaq, Elijah Kunnuk and John Inooya, musicians from Igloolik who had collaborated in various bands since the 1970s, the band released the self-titled album in 1985 through the CBC Northern Service. The band played various festival dates, including at Folk on the Rocks and Expo 86, to support the album. They continued for many years afterward to play concert dates in Canadian Arctic communities, but could not afford to record a followup album due to the extremely high cost of doing so in remote Arctic communities; they did, however, record some individual singles.

In 2007, the band broke up after the deaths of Kunnuk and Inukshuk. In 2012, the independent label Supreme Echo Records released Sinaaktuq, a compilation of the original album and the non-album singles.

In 2017, Aakuluk Music, the record label owned and operated by Nunavut-based band The Jerry Cans, reissued the 1985 album and convinced the band to reunite. With new members Derek Aqqiaruq and Allan Kangok, the band worked with record producer Michael Phillip Wojewoda to record Siqinnaarut, which was released in 2018. The album was a Juno Award nominee for Indigenous Music Album of the Year at the Juno Awards of 2020.

In 2023, Ungalaq released the solo album rebel music / E5-2143 under the stage name qiyuapik. In 2024, he appeared as a guest collaborator on the debut album by Echoes Of, a side project led by Andrew Morrison of the Jerry Cans.
