= Kelly Fraser =

Inuk Canadian singer-songwriter (1993-2019)

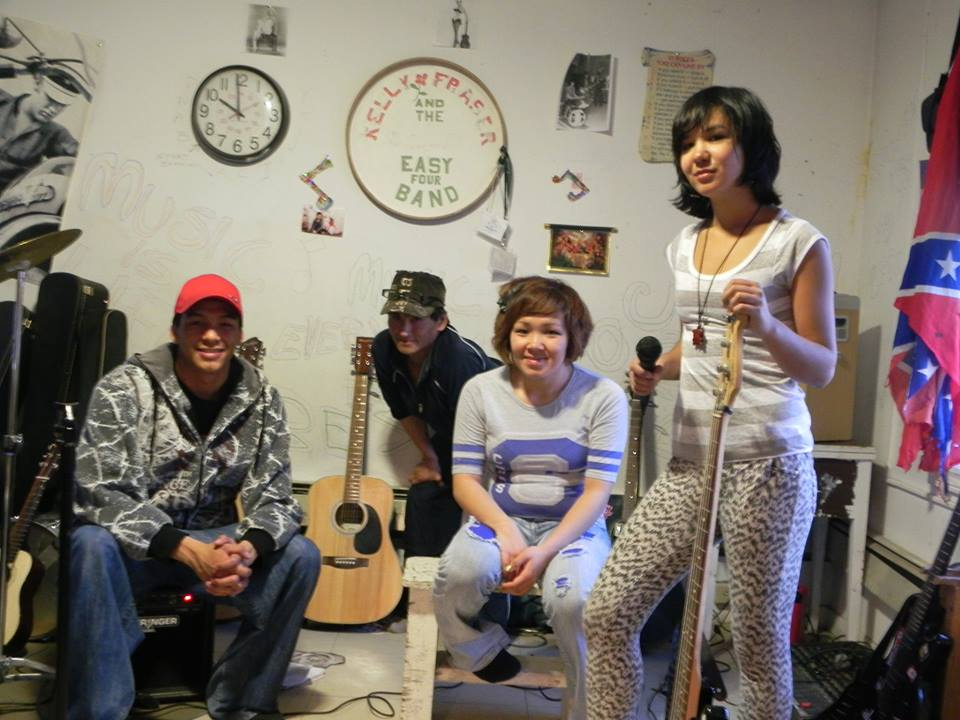
- Kelly Fraser and her band The Easy Four around 2013

Background information
- Born: August 8, 1993; Igloolik, Nunavut, Canada
- Died: December 24, 2019 (aged 26) Winnipeg, Manitoba, Canada
- Genres: Inuit Traditional; pop
- Instruments: Vocals; guitar; keyboards
- Years active: 2010–2019
- Label: Hitmakerz
- Website: https://www.kellyfrasermusic.com/

Kelly Fraser (August 8, 1993 – December 24, 2019) was a Canadian Inuk pop singer and songwriter, whose second album, Sedna, received a Juno Award nomination for Indigenous Music Album of the Year at the Juno Awards of 2018.

== Life and career ==
Born in Igloolik, Nunavut, Fraser moved with her family at a young age to Sanikiluaq. She was educated at Nunavut Sivuniksavut in Ottawa before completing an indigenous studies program at the Nicola Valley Institute of Technology in British Columbia. Nunavut Sivuniksavut launched in 1985 and is Canada's oldest and first Inuit post-secondary program, where Inuit youth learn about the Nunavut Land Claims Agreement.

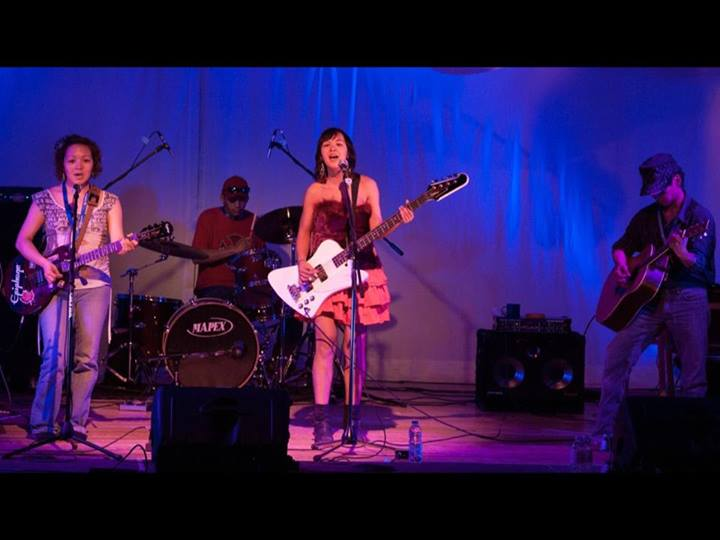
Kelly Fraser and her band on stage around 2013

Fraser first attracted widespread attention in 2013 with a series of Inuktitut covers of pop songs, most notably Rihanna's "Diamonds", on YouTube. She released her debut album, Isuma, in 2014. Her songs include Inuktitut and English language, and musically, combine contemporary pop with traditional Inuit sounds. Fraser was dedicated to sharing Inuit culture with a widespread audience and raising awareness of present-day issues and Inuit rights; many of these themes feature heavily in her music. Her producer reported that she was working on another album, to be called Decolonize, when she died; crowdfunding for the album was underway at that time.

== Death ==
Fraser died at her home in Winnipeg, Manitoba, on December 24, 2019, by suicide. According to her family she had suffered through "childhood traumas, racism and persistent cyberbullying". Several candlelight vigils in her honour were held at The Forks on January 4 and at the Nicola Valley Institute of Technology in Merritt, British Columbia.

== Discography ==
=== Isuma ===
Fraser's first album, released in June 2014, was recorded with her band mates from Sanikiluaq, with seven original and three cover songs. The title means 'think'.

=== Sedna ===
Sedna was released on February 25, 2017, by Nunavut's Hitmakerz record label. The title of the album, known as ᓄᓕᐊᔪᒃ (Nuliaju) in Inuktitut, refers to the story of Sedna, the Inuit goddess of the sea, which Fraser decided to modernize in this album. She said, "The goal of the album is to help heal those suffering from the effects of colonization, including the damaging effects of residential school and forced relocation. There is a great need for Inuit artists to directly speak to those affected from the past."

The album included the song 'Fight for the Right', released as part of the 'no' campaign in the 2016 Nunavut municipal land referendum, which asked voters whether they were willing to allow municipal lands to be sold.
