= Charlie Panigoniak =

Inuk singer-songwriter and guitarist (1946–2019)

- Born: 7 March 1946 near Chesterfield Inlet, Northwest Territories
- Died: 6 March 2019 (aged 72) Rankin Inlet, Nunavut
- Genres: Inuit
- Occupation(s): Singer-songwriter, guitarist

Charlie Panigoniak ONu (ᓵᓕ ᐸᓂᒍᓂᐊᖅ, 7 March 1946 – 6 March 2019), born in Chesterfield Inlet, Northwest Territories in what is now Nunavut, Canada, was an Inuk singer-songwriter and guitarist whose albums reflect on northern life.

He began recording in the early 1970s, including projects for broadcaster CBC Northern Service. His Inuktitut language rendition of "Rudolph the Red-Nosed Reindeer" (ᕈᑕᒥ ᑐᒃᑐᒐᖃᓚᐅᓂᐳᖅ, Rutami tuktugaqalaunipuq) with Lorna Tasseor was featured on the 1996 compilation A Northern Christmas (ᐅᑭᐅᖅᑕᖅᑐ ᖁᕕᐊᓱᒡᕕᒃ, Ukiuqtaqtu quviasugvik).

== Biography ==
Charlie Panigoniak was born on 7 March 1946 in the town of Chesterfield Inlet, Northwest Territories. By the time he was 30, he was already a prominent performer of Inuit music in many different Inuit communities around what is now Nunavut. Panigoniak is an interesting artist because he has taken mainstream music and songs and covered them using his own unique style of music. Perhaps the most well known example of this is Panigoniak's cover of "Rudolph the Red-Nosed Reindeer", a popular children's Christmas song. Panigoniak has collaborated with his partner Lorna Tasseor for the past 30 years. He is not only the lead singer and song writer but also plays guitar and keyboard with Tasseor as an accompanying singer.

Panigoniak was born in the north of Canada. This meant that he was cut off from the majority of the mainstream cultural happenings in Canada and would have been heavily influenced by the traditions of his community. In the late 1950s the Canadian government decided to settle starving inland Inuit in a variety of coastal communities. With these new immigrants to the area came new thoughts and ideas and, perhaps, a potential to hear mainstream Canadian music.

Panigoniak's father gave him his first guitar when the musician was 21. This guitar was made from a tin can. It allowed Panigoniak to become a "skillful manipulator of the country music idiom". In 1967, Panigoniak had to travel to Brandon, Manitoba to receive treatment for tuberculosis. This excursion to a big city not only opened the musician's eyes to new forms of music. It also gave him the opportunity to buy his first real guitar. Since getting that guitar Panigoniak has developed a country folk style of music. His songs often concern his friends, family and everyday occurrences and events from his life. These songs are written in the Inuktitut language. This shows how important traditions and his northern home are to Panigoniak.

While playing at Rankin Inlet, Northwest Territories in 1973 Panigoniak was overheard by Doug Ward. Ward was a producer with CBC and liked Panigoniak's sound so much that he arranged for a recording session in Toronto during the following summer. Panigoniak went on to record 3 records for the CBC Northern Service. These records include two EPs (11 songs) and the LPs Inuktitut Christmas & Gospel Songs (ᖁᕕᐊᓱᒃᕕᒃᓯᐅᑎᑦ ᑐᒃᓯᐊᕈᑎᓪᓗ), My Seasons (ᐱᐅᓯᑲ) and Just for Kids (ᓱᕈᓯᑯᓗᖕᓄᑦ). The children's album was recorded with Tasseor, Panigoniak's "frequent partner" from this point on. This album shows Panigoniak's love of singing for children. Panigoniak has also made two CBC broadcast EPs.

In 2012, he was awarded the territory's highest honour, the Order of Nunavut, along with artist Kenojuak Ashevak and they were both named "ambassadors for our territory and its people". The honour "acknowledges achievement and contribution to the territory, which has either a cultural, social, or economic significance".

Panigoniak died 6 March 2019 at his home in Rankin Inlet, one day prior to his 73rd birthday.

== Bibliography ==
- Whidden, L. (1981). Charlie Panigoniak: Eskimo music in transition. Retrieved 5 October 2008, from http://cjtm.icaap.org/content/9/v9art4.html
