= Twin Flames (band) =

Canadian folk band

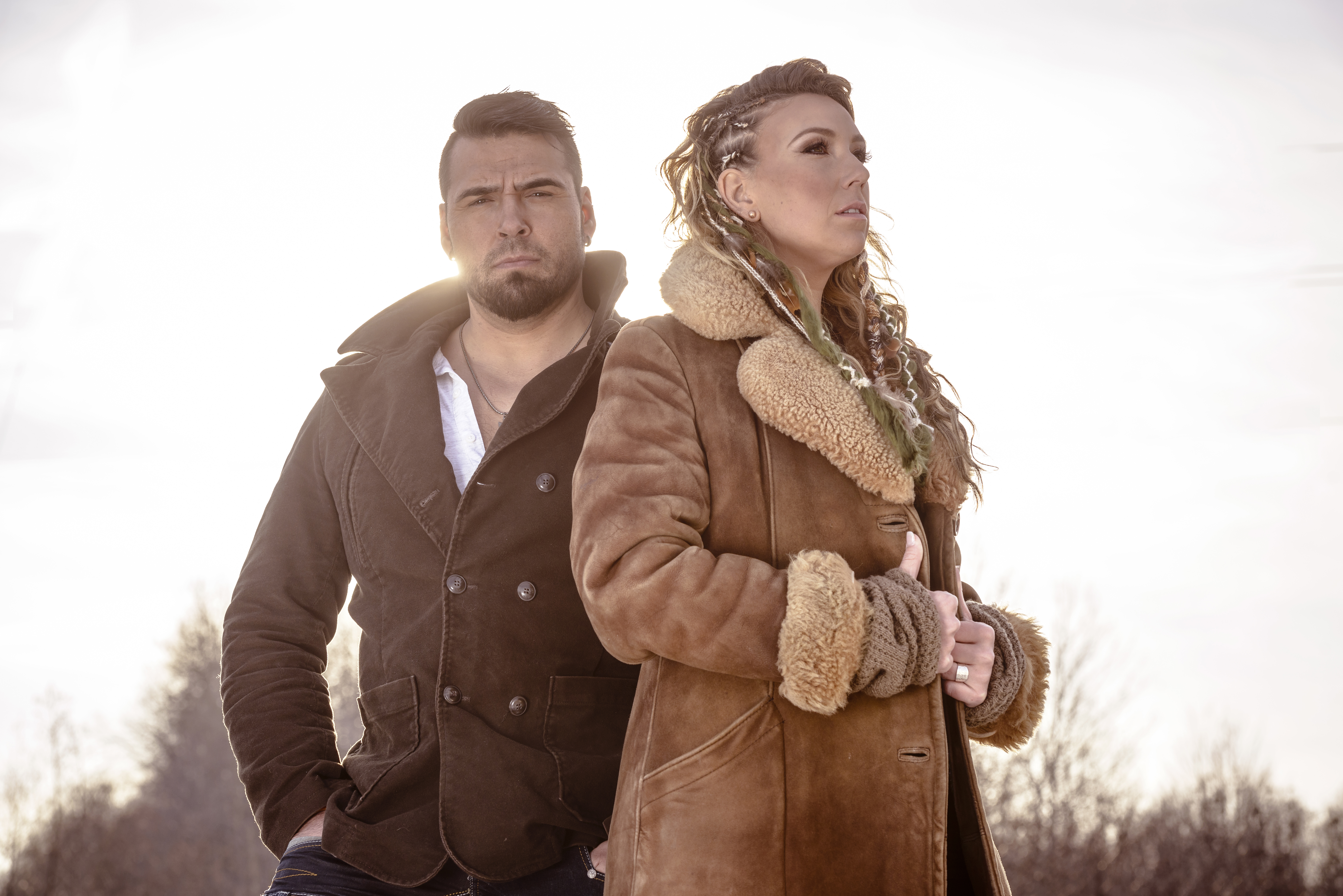

Background information
- Origin: Quebec, Canada
- Genres: Folk
- Instruments: Vocals, guitar, native american flute, Irish hand drum
- Years active: 2015–2025
- Members: Sunchild Deer-Okpik (Jaaji Okpik); Chelsey June
- Past members: Mike Giamberardino; Troy Huizinga; Scott Norris; Jason Watts
- Website: twinflamesmusic.com

Twin Flames was a Canadian folk music duo based in Quebec.

== History ==
The band was formed in 2015, releasing their debut album Jaaji and Chelsey June the same year. Their second album, Signal Fire, followed in 2017.

In 2019, Twin Flames released the song "Human", chosen by UNESCO as the official song to celebrate the International Year of Indigenous Languages. They released Omen in 2020, and in 2023 issued Twin Flames Unplugged Live, a collection of seven re-recorded songs. Their final LP, Hugging the Cactus, was released in 2024.

In June 2025, Sunchild Deer-Okpik, also known as Jaaji, was arrested and charged with seven alleged sexual offences said to have occurred between January and May 2000. The charges include sexual assault, sexual touching of a young person while in a position of authority, and forcible confinement.

In August 2025, the duo announced that they were separating and that Twin Flames had come to an end, concluding nearly a decade of recording and touring together.

== Band members ==
Current members

- Sunchild Deer-Okpik (Jaaji Okpik) – vocals, guitar (2015–2025)
- Chelsey June – vocals, Native American flute, Irish hand drum (2015–2025)

Former members

- Mike Giamberardino – bass, synthesizer, background vocals (2019–2021)
- Troy Huizinga – lead guitar, rhythm guitar, keyboard, bass, synthesizer, background vocals (2019–2022)
- Scott Norris – lead guitar, rhythm guitar, synthesizer, background vocals (2021–2022)
- Jason Watts – drums, background vocals (2019–2022)

== Discography ==
- Jaaji and Chelsey June (2015)
- Signal Fire (2017)
- Omen (2020)
- Twin Flames Unplugged Live (2023)
- Hugging the Cactus (2024)

== Awards and nominations ==
Year	Nominee / work	Award	Result
2016	Canadian Folk Music Awards	Aboriginal Songwriters of the Year	Won
2016	Native American Music Awards	Best Folk Recording	Nominated
2016	Native American Music Awards	Debut Duo of the Year	Nominated
2017	Canadian Folk Music Awards	Aboriginal Songwriters of the Year	Won
2017	Indigenous Music Awards	Best Folk Album	Nominated
2017	Canadian Folk Music Awards	Vocal Group of the Year	Nominated
2017	Canadian Folk Music Awards	World Group of the Year	Nominated
2017	Independent Music Awards	Indigenous Artist/Group of the Year	Nominated
2018	Native American Music Association Awards	Best Folk Recording	Won
2018	Native American Music Association Awards	Duo of the Year	Won
2018	Native American Music Association Awards	Record of the Year	Nominated
2018	Native American Music Association Awards	Song of the Year	Nominated
2018	Native American Music Association Awards	Best Music Video	Nominated
2018	Native American Music Association Awards	Best Americana Recording	Nominated
2018	Native American Music Association Awards	Best Historical/Linguistic Performance	Nominated
2018	Indigenous Music Awards	Best Folk Album	Nominated
2018	Indian Summer Music Awards	Folk Album of the Year	Nominated
2018	Indian Summer Music Awards	Best Native American Vocal	Nominated
2018	Indian Summer Music Awards	Pop Song of the Year	Nominated
2019	Native American Music Association Awards	Best Indie Single of the Year	Nominated
2019	Native American Music Association Awards	Best Concept for a Music Video	Won
2021	Summer Solstice Indigenous Music Awards	Recording Artist of the Year	Nominated
2021	Summer Solstice Indigenous Music Awards	Radio Song/Single of the Year	Won
2021	Summer Solstice Indigenous Music Awards	Pop/Rock/Alternative Album of the Year	Won
2021	Summer Solstice Indigenous Music Awards	Music in the Arts	Won
2022	Native American Music Awards	Best Group/Duo of the Year	Nominated
2022	Native American Music Awards	Pop Recording	Nominated
2022	Native American Music Awards	Best Pop Video	Nominated
2022	Native American Music Awards	Best Contemporary Vocal Video	Nominated
2022	Capital Music Awards	Group of the Year	Won
2022	TD Indigenous Songwriter Award	Songwriter of the Year	Nominated
2022	Canadian Folk Music Awards	Indigenous Songwriter(s) of the Year	Won
2022	Canadian Folk Music Awards	Vocal Group of the Year	Won
2023	Arctic Music Awards	Group of the Year	Won
2023	Arctic Music Awards	Indigenous Group of the Year	Nominated
2023	Arctic Music Awards	Single of the Year	Nominated
2023	Arctic Music Awards	Album of the Year	Nominated
2023	Arctic Music Awards	Music Video of the Year	Nominated
2024	Canadian Folk Music Awards	Vocal Group of the Year	Nominated
2025	Capital Music Awards	Group of the Year	Won
