= Tumasi Quissa =

Tumasi Quissa (born in 1948 at a camp near Akulivik, Quebec, Canada) is an Inuk singer-songwriter and a carver. Tumasi and his brother performed a few songs live on Canadian national television as part of 1981's Canada Day celebrations, and they were such a hit that CBC Northern Service Broadcast Recordings decided to issue a whole LP of their material entitled Better Times (De Meilleurs Jours).
