= Tudjaat =

Canadian musical group

- Origin: Nunavut, Canada
- Genre: Inuit throat singing
- Members: Madeleine Allakariallak; Phoebe Atagotaaluk

Tudjaat were Madeleine Allakariallak and Phoebe Atagotaaluk, two Inuit women from Nunavut, Canada who are known for their recordings and performances of traditional Inuit throat singing.

== History ==
Tudjaat was founded in 1994 after producer Randall Prescott heard Allakariallak perform as part of a backup chorus with Susan Aglukark's third CD. When he learned that Atagotaaluk, her cousin, was also a throat singer, he arranged to have the pair brought together with several backup musicians for a recording session which combined their traditional singing with modern guitar, keyboard, bass and drum music. The result was a six-track CD titled Tudjaat.

Tudjaat features "Kajusita (When My Ship Comes In)", a song written by Allakariallak, Jon Park-Wheeler, and Randall Prescott. The song, which describes the forced exile of a group of Inuit to the High Arctic in the last century, is a tribute to those who suffered and died as a consequence of a government decision.

"Kajusita" won the CD's its producers the 1997 American Indian Film Institute Awards Best Song award, was included on a United Nations compilation CD entitled Here and Now, A celebration of Canadian Music, The Music of The First Peoples and Folk Music, and was made into a music video. Tudjaat was nominated for a Juno Award for Best Music of Aboriginal Canada in 1997, but did not win.

The next year Tudjaat's "Qingauiit", written by Jon Park-Wheeler and Randall Prescott, was included on Putumayo's A Native American Odyssey: Inuit to Inca. Also that year the pair's singing was featured on Robbie Robertson's CD Contact from the Underworld of Redboy. After the short-lived career of Tudjaat, Allakariallak worked for the CBC Northern Service and then in 2005 became a news host on the Aboriginal Peoples Television Network.
