= The Jerry Cans =

Band from Iqaluit

- Also known as: ᐸᐃ ᒑᓚᖃᐅᑎᒃᑯᑦ, Pai Gaalaqautikkut
- Origin: Iqaluit, Nunavut, Canada
- Genres: folk music, indie-rock, Inuit music
- Label: Aakuluk Music
- Members: Andrew Morrison; Brendan Doherty; Gina Burgess; Steve Rigby; Avery Keenainak
- Past members: Nancy Mike

The Jerry Cans (Inuktitut: ᐸᐃ ᒑᓚᖃᐅᑎᒃᑯᑦ, Pai Gaalaqautikkut) are a band from Iqaluit, Nunavut who combine traditional Inuit throat singing with folk music and country rock. Their music is largely written in Inuktitut, the Indigenous language of the Inuit, with lyrics which "reflect the challenges and beauty of life in the Far North". Their 2016 album, Inuusiq/Life, was released on Aakuluk Music, Nunavut's first record label, which the band's members established in 2016 "to support Inuit and Indigenous musicians".

The band consists of vocalist and guitarist Andrew Morrison, vocalist and accordionist Avery Keenainak, violinist Gina Burgess, bassist Brendan Doherty, and drummer Steve Rigby. The band's name derives from Rigby once trying to build a drum set out of old jerrycans.

== Background ==
The band originated as a blues rock trio featuring Morrison, Doherty, and Rigby while the three lived in Peterborough, Ontario, attending post secondary education. After moving to Iqaluit, Nunavut, the group expanded to include Nancy Mike, an accordionist and throat singer originally from Pangnirtung, Nunavut. Later, Burgess, originally from Halifax, Nova Scotia, and also a member of Gypsophilia, joined the band after visiting Iqaluit on a cultural exchange program between the Maritime Conservatory of Performing Arts and the Iqaluit Fiddle Ensemble.

== Career ==
Their debut album, Nunavuttitut, was released in 2012.

The band were locally successful in their early years, but began to attract wider mainstream attention after Tanya Tagaq won the Polaris Music Prize in 2014, increasing the visibility and commercial viability of Inuit throat singing. Their third album Inuusiq/Life, released in 2016, was produced by Michael Phillip Wojewoda. They have toured extensively, including across Canada and festival dates in Australia and New Zealand.

In 2017, the band released an Inuttitut-language cover of The Tragically Hip's "Ahead by a Century". In the same year, they organized the first Nunavut Music Week as a platform to showcase musicians from the territory. They also recorded and performed music for the Aboriginal Peoples Television Network (APTN) children's series Anaana's Tent, including "Naasailu", a counting song; "Uumajut", a song about traditional Inuit food; and "We're Headed to Anaana's Tent", the program's primary theme song.

In January 2020, founding member Nancy Mike left the band. Soon after, they released two new singles, "Atauttikkut" (January 24) and "Havava" (February 14), as a preview of their upcoming album Echoes, which was released on May 15.

In 2024, Morrison released an album, Euphemisms, with the side project Echoes Of. Collaborators on the album included Terry Uyarak, Jace Lasek and James Ungalaq of Northern Haze.

== Aakuluk Music ==
In 2016, the band established the record label Aakuluk Music to release albums by Nunavut-based artists. In addition to the band's own albums, the label has also released music by Aasiva, FxckMr, Northern Haze, Riit, Terry Uyarak, and The Trade-Offs.

== Awards ==
In 2013, Mike won the Canadian Folk Music Award for Aboriginal Songwriter of the Year at the 9th Canadian Folk Music Awards. In 2015, the band garnered two nominations at the 11th Canadian Folk Music Awards, for Aboriginal Songwriter of the Year and Pushing the Boundaries.

The band received Juno Award nominations for Breakthrough Group of the Year and Contemporary Roots Album of the Year at the Juno Awards of 2018. They performed their song "Ukiuq" live at the televised ceremony, with a collective of supporting musicians from Nunavut including Josh Qaumariaq, Avery Keenainak and James Ungalaq.

== Books ==
The Jerry Cans wrote a children's board book in 2017 titled Mamaqtuq! (ISBN 9781772271447) based on their song of the same name. Mamaqtuq! is bilingual, written in Inuktitut and English, and is illustrated by Eric Kim.

== Discography ==
- Nunavuttitut / ᓄᓇᕗᑦᑎᑐᑦ (2012)
- Aakuluk / ᐋᑯᓗᒃ (2014)
- Inuusiq/Life / ᐃᓅᓯᖅ (2016)
- Echoes (2020)
