= Riit =

Canadian Inuk musician

- Born: Rita Claire Mike-Murphy
- Origin: Pangnirtung, Nunavut
- Genre: Inuit music
- Occupations: Musician and television personality
- Label: Six Shooter Records
- Website: Official website

Riit (ᕇᑦ) is the stage name of Rita Claire Mike-Murphy, a Canadian Inuk musician and television personality from Pangnirtung, Nunavut who is most noted as the host of APTN's children's series Anaana's Tent.

As Riit, she released her self-titled debut EP, a collaboration with The Jerry Cans and producer Michael Phillip Wojewoda, in 2017 on Aakuluk Music. In 2019, she released the single "Qaumajuapik", and performed the song live on CBC Radio One's Q in May. Her album Ataataga, produced by Graham Walsh, was released in October 2019 on Six Shooter Records. The album was a Juno Award nominee for Indigenous Music Album of the Year at the Juno Awards of 2020, and was a longlisted nominee for the 2020 Polaris Music Prize. Her song "#uvangattauq" was shortlisted for the 2020 SOCAN Songwriting Prize and was a collaboration with South African-Canadian singer Zaki Ibrahim, who provides the English vocals on the song.

She won the Emerging Talent Award from the Youth Media Alliance in 2019 for her work on Anaana's Tent.

In 2020, she appeared as a duet vocalist on Terry Uyarak's single "Anuri".
