= Inuit throat singing =

Form of musical performance uniquely found among the Inuit

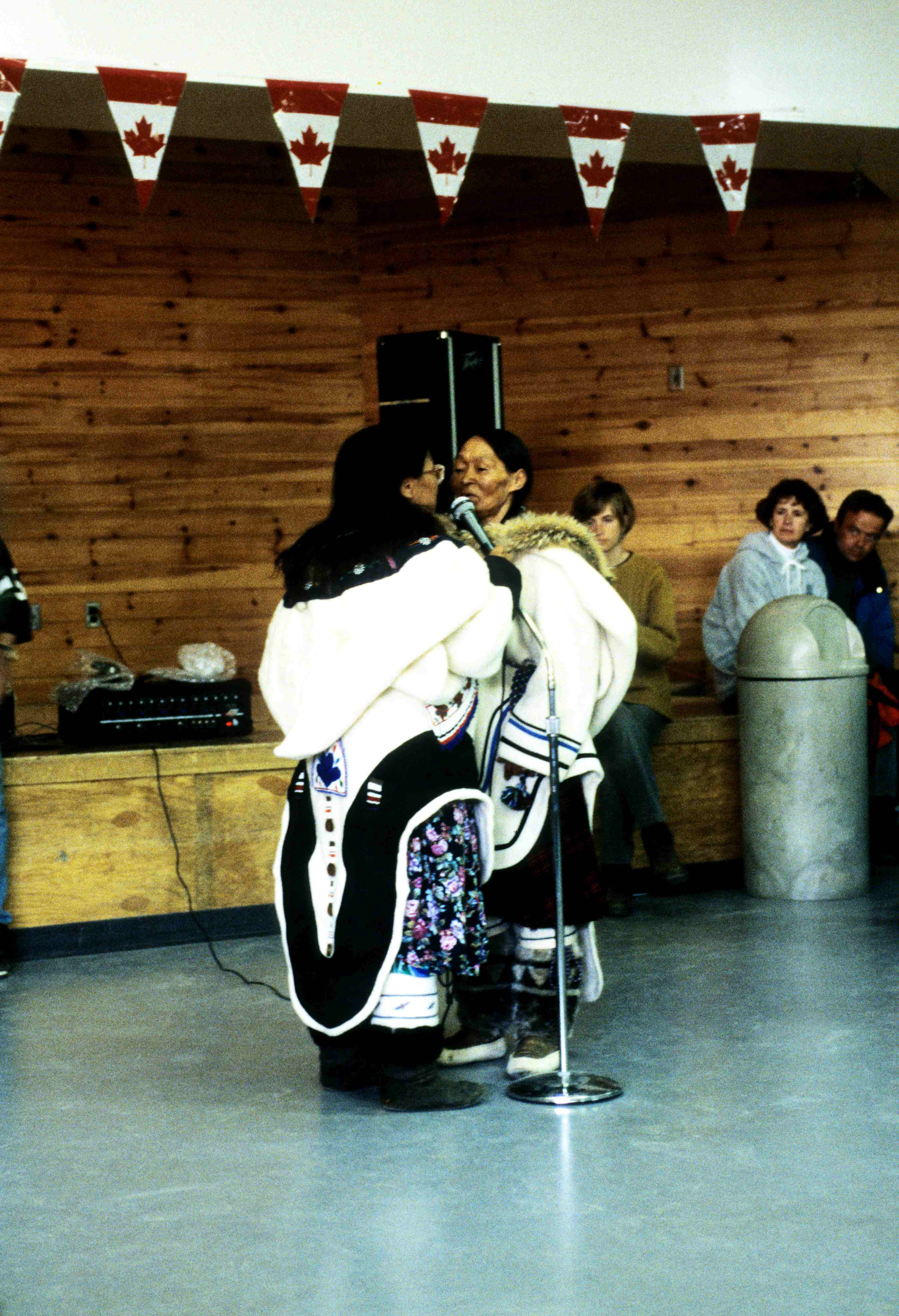
Traditional throat singers

Inuit throat singing, or katajjaq (Inuktitut: ᑲᑕᔾᔭᖅ), is a distinct type of throat singing uniquely found among the Inuit. It is a form of musical performance, traditionally consisting of two women who sing duets in a close face-to-face formation with no instrumental accompaniment, in an entertaining contest to see who can outlast the other; however, one of the genre's most famous practitioners, Tanya Tagaq, performs as a solo artist. Several groups, including Tudjaat, The Jerry Cans, Quantum Tangle and Silla + Rise, blend traditional throat singing with mainstream musical genres such as pop, folk, rock and dance music.

An analogous form called rekuhkara was once practiced among the Ainu of Hokkaidō, Japan.

== Names ==
The name for throat singing in Canada varies with the geography:

- Iirngaaq – some Nunavut communities
- Piqqusiraarniq or Pirkusirtuk – Igloolik and Baffin Island
- Qiarvaaqtuq – Arviat
- Katajjaq or Katadjak – Nunavik and South Baffin
- Nipaquhiit – some Nunavut communities

== History ==
Originally, katajjaq was a form of entertainment among Inuit women while men were away on hunting trips, and it was regarded more as a type of vocal or breathing game in the Inuit culture rather than a form of music. Katajjiniq sound can create an impression of rhythmic and harmonious panting. Inuit throat singing can also imitate wind, water, animal sounds and other everyday sounds.

This playful practice testifies to a long oral tradition of the women of Nunavik, a territory located in the North Québec region. From generation to generation, the Inuit have passed on knowledge of nature and the environment as well as the techniques associated with throat singing. Katajjaniq has rare, even unique, expressive characteristics. Even though Inuit throat singing is no longer performed to hasten the return of hunters, attract animals or influence the natural elements, they still retain some of their original functions, such as entertainment and group cohesion.

Very much alive in the Inuit communities of Quebec, the katajjaniq still marks the high points of Nunavik people since it is present in calendar holidays, cultural celebrations and important political events. A source of great pride and a powerful symbol of identity, the katajjaniq is a distinctive expression of Nunavik culture. The Inuit recognize katajjaniq as part of their cultural heritage.

== Performance ==
Two women face each other usually in a standing position and holding each other's arms. Sometimes they will do some kind of dance movements while singing (e.g., balancing from right to left). One singer leads by setting a short rhythmic pattern, which she repeats leaving brief silent intervals between each repetition. The other singer fills in the gap with another rhythmic pattern. The sounds used include voiced sounds as well as unvoiced ones, both through inhalation or exhalation. The first to run out of breath or be unable to maintain the pace of the other singer will start to laugh or simply stop and will thus be eliminated from the game. It generally lasts between one and three minutes. The winner is the singer who beats the largest number of people.

At one time, the lips of the two women almost touched, so that one singer used the mouth cavity of the other as a resonator, but this is less common in present day. Often, the singing is accompanied by a shuffling in rhythm from one foot to the other. The sounds may be actual words or nonsense syllables or created during exhalation.

The old woman who teaches the children [throat singing songs] corrects sloppy intonation of contours, poorly meshed phase displacements, and vague rhythms exactly like a Western vocal coach.

== Notable performers ==
Notable performers include Tanya Tagaq, who performs in a contemporary style, and The Jerry Cans, who incorporate throat singing by band member Nancy Mike as a musical and rhythmic element in a conventional folk rock sound and style. Traditional performers include Qaunak Mikkigak, Kathleen Ivaluarjuk Merritt, as well as Alacie Tullaugaq and Lucy Amarualik who perform in the Katajjaq style.

== Inuit throat singing in popular culture ==
- In 2005, Tafelmusik Baroque Orchestra recorded The Four Seasons Mosaic CD and DVD documentary. A reinvention of Vivaldi's Four Seasons by Mychael Danna featuring Tafelmusik Baroque Orchestra; Jeanne Lamon, violin; Aruna Narayan, sarangi; Wen Zhao, pipa and throat singers Aqsarniit (Sylvia Cloutier and June Shappa).
- The British ITV documentary Billy Connolly: Journey to the Edge of the World features Billy Connolly in the Canadian Arctic. In the second episode, he visits a pair of women demonstrating the finer points of throat singing.
- The 2012 CBC TV drama series Arctic Air features a theme song written by Tim McCauley and performed by Tanya Tagaq, incorporating elements of traditional Inuit throat singing over a modern dance beat.
- Tanya Tagaq won the 2014 Polaris Music Prize for her album Animism.
- In November 2015, incoming Canadian Prime Minister Justin Trudeau and his cabinet were sworn in by the Governor General. A pair of eleven-year-old Inuit girls, Samantha Metcalfe and Cailyn Degrandpre, performed throat singing at the ceremony.
- In January 2019, performers Eva Kaukai and Manon Chamberland premiered the short film Throat Singing in Kangirsuk (Katatjatuuk Kangirsumi) at the Sundance Film Festival.
- In March 2020, professional singer Caroline Novalinga and her daughter Shina Novalinga gained recognition for videos throat singing on the video sharing app TikTok. They released an album together in June 2021.
- Throat singing duo Iva and Angu received a Juno Award nomination for Traditional Indigenous Artist of the Year at the Juno Awards of 2023 for their album Katajjausiit.

== Recognition ==
In 2014, Nunavik throat singing (katajjaniq) became the first cultural item to be given the intangible cultural heritage designation by the government of the province of Quebec, Canada.

== See also ==
- Akazehe
- Tuvan throat singing
- Throat singing
