= Canadian Folk Music Award for Indigenous Songwriter of the Year =

Annual music award

The Canadian Folk Music Award for Indigenous Songwriter of the Year is a Canadian award, presented as part of the Canadian Folk Music Awards to honour the year's best songwriting by First Nations and Inuit artists. Unlike many songwriting awards, the nomination is given in consideration of all of the songwriting on a whole album rather than singling out individual songs. Awards are also presented for English Songwriter of the Year and French Songwriter of the Year.

The award was formerly presented as Aboriginal Songwriter of the Year, and was renamed from aboriginal to indigenous in 2018.

== 2000s ==
Year	Nominee	Album	Ref
2005; 1st Canadian Folk Music Awards
2005; 1st Canadian Folk Music Awards	No award presented		
2006; 2nd Canadian Folk Music Awards
2006; 2nd Canadian Folk Music Awards	Wayne Lavallee	Green Dress	
2006; 2nd Canadian Folk Music Awards	Digging Roots	seeds	
2006; 2nd Canadian Folk Music Awards	Don Freed	The Valley of Green and Blue	
2006; 2nd Canadian Folk Music Awards	Art Napoleon	Miyoskamin	
2006; 2nd Canadian Folk Music Awards	Laura Vinson	It Reminds Me	
2007; 3rd Canadian Folk Music Awards
2007; 3rd Canadian Folk Music Awards	Sandy Scofield	Nikawiy Askiy	
2007; 3rd Canadian Folk Music Awards	Leela Gilday	Sedzé	
2007; 3rd Canadian Folk Music Awards	Ry Moran	Groundwater	
2007; 3rd Canadian Folk Music Awards	Karen Donaldson Shepherd (The Crow Girls)	Where the Green Grass Grows	
2007; 3rd Canadian Folk Music Awards	Laura Vinson	Mossbag Lullaby	
2008; 4th Canadian Folk Music Awards
2008; 4th Canadian Folk Music Awards	No award presented		
2009; 5th Canadian Folk Music Awards
2009; 5th Canadian Folk Music Awards	Don Amero	Deepening	
2009; 5th Canadian Folk Music Awards	Vince Fontaine, Jay Bodner, Chris Burke-Gaffney (Eagle & Hawk)	Sirensong	
2009; 5th Canadian Folk Music Awards	Violet Naytowhow	Wind of the North	
2009; 5th Canadian Folk Music Awards	Buffy Sainte-Marie	Running for the Drum	
2009; 5th Canadian Folk Music Awards	Tanya Tagaq	Auk/Blood	

== 2010s ==
Year	Nominee	Album	Ref
2010; 6th Canadian Folk Music Awards
2010; 6th Canadian Folk Music Awards	Asani	Listen	
2010; 6th Canadian Folk Music Awards	Eagle and Hawk	The Great Unknown	
2010; 6th Canadian Folk Music Awards	Wayne Lavallee	Trail of Tears	
2010; 6th Canadian Folk Music Awards	Brenda MacIntyre	Medicine Song	
2010; 6th Canadian Folk Music Awards	Tom Racine	Three Mile Junction	
2011; 7th Canadian Folk Music Awards
2011; 7th Canadian Folk Music Awards	Vince Fontaine	Songs for Turtle Island	
2011; 7th Canadian Folk Music Awards	Don Amero	The Long Way Home	
2011; 7th Canadian Folk Music Awards	Robert Davidson, Terri-Lynn Williams-Davidson	New Journeys	
2011; 7th Canadian Folk Music Awards	Janet Panic	Samples	
2011; 7th Canadian Folk Music Awards	Kristi Lane Sinclair	I Love You	
2012; 8th Canadian Folk Music Awards
2012; 8th Canadian Folk Music Awards	No award presented		
2013; 9th Canadian Folk Music Awards
2013; 9th Canadian Folk Music Awards	Nancy Mike (The Jerry Cans)	Nunavuttitut	
2013; 9th Canadian Folk Music Awards	Don Amero	Heart on My Sleeve	
2013; 9th Canadian Folk Music Awards	Vince Fontaine (Indian City)	Supernation	
2013; 9th Canadian Folk Music Awards	Diem Lafortune	Beauty and Hard Times	
2013; 9th Canadian Folk Music Awards	Kristi Lane Sinclair	The Sea Alone	
2014; 10th Canadian Folk Music Awards
2014; 10th Canadian Folk Music Awards	Amanda Rheaume, John MacDonald	Keep a Fire	
2014; 10th Canadian Folk Music Awards	Buffy & Larry	Surrounded	
2014; 10th Canadian Folk Music Awards	Vince Fontaine (Indian City)	Colors	
2014; 10th Canadian Folk Music Awards	Jasmine Netsena	Take You With Me	
2014; 10th Canadian Folk Music Awards	Tanya Tagaq	Animism	
2015; 11th Canadian Folk Music Awards
2015; 11th Canadian Folk Music Awards	Raven Kanatakta and ShoShona Kish (Digging Roots)	For the Light	
2015; 11th Canadian Folk Music Awards	Miranda Currie	Up in the Air	
2015; 11th Canadian Folk Music Awards	The Jerry Cans	Aakuluk	
2015; 11th Canadian Folk Music Awards	Buffy Sainte-Marie	Power in the Blood	
2015; 11th Canadian Folk Music Awards	Laura Vinson and Free Spirit	Warrior	
2016; 12th Canadian Folk Music Awards
2016; 12th Canadian Folk Music Awards	Twin Flames	Jaaji and Chelsey June	
2016; 12th Canadian Folk Music Awards	Digawolf	Great Northern Man	
2016; 12th Canadian Folk Music Awards	Nadia Gaudet and Jason Burnstick	Dream Big, Little One / Fais de beaux rêves, petit ange	
2016; 12th Canadian Folk Music Awards	William Prince	Earthly Days	
2016; 12th Canadian Folk Music Awards	Amanda Rheaume	Holding Patterns	
2017; 13th Canadian Folk Music Awards
2017; 13th Canadian Folk Music Awards	Twin Flames	Signal Fire	
2017; 13th Canadian Folk Music Awards	Desiree Dorion	Tough Street	
2017; 13th Canadian Folk Music Awards	Lisa Muswagon	Buffalo and Rabbits	
2017; 13th Canadian Folk Music Awards	Cindy Paul	The Flight	
2017; 13th Canadian Folk Music Awards	Julian Taylor, Kinnie Starr, John Parente, Bill Bell	Desert Star	
2018; 14th Canadian Folk Music Awards
2018; 14th Canadian Folk Music Awards	Shauit	Apu peikussiak^{u}	
2018; 14th Canadian Folk Music Awards	Tiffany Ayalik, Grey Gritt (Quantum Tangle)	Shelter as we go...	
2018; 14th Canadian Folk Music Awards	Buffy Sainte-Marie	Medicine Songs	
2018; 14th Canadian Folk Music Awards	Dennis Shorty	Gucho Hin	
2018; 14th Canadian Folk Music Awards	Sandra Sutter	Cluster Stars	

== 2020s ==
Year	Nominee	Album	Ref
2020; 15th Canadian Folk Music Awards
2020; 15th Canadian Folk Music Awards	Diyet van Lieshout	Diyet & the Love Soldiers	
2020; 15th Canadian Folk Music Awards	Sugar Plum Croxen, Shelley Hamilton, George Elliott Clarke (The Afro-Métis Nation)	Constitution	
2020; 15th Canadian Folk Music Awards	Jenelle Duval, Danielle Benoit, Stacey Howse (Eastern Owl)	Qama’si	
2020; 15th Canadian Folk Music Awards	Joshua Haulli	Aqqut	
2020; 15th Canadian Folk Music Awards	Mike Paul	Origine	
2021; 16th Canadian Folk Music Awards
2021; 16th Canadian Folk Music Awards	Leela Gilday	North Star Calling	
2021; 16th Canadian Folk Music Awards	Jason and Nadia Burnstick	Kîyânaw	
2021; 16th Canadian Folk Music Awards	A. W. Cardinal	Bare Knuckles & Brawn	
2021; 16th Canadian Folk Music Awards	Riit	ataataga	
2021; 16th Canadian Folk Music Awards	Crystal Shawanda	Church House Blues	
2022; 17th Canadian Folk Music Awards
2022; 17th Canadian Folk Music Awards	Chelsey June & Jaaji	Omen	
2022; 17th Canadian Folk Music Awards	David Laronde	I Know I Can Fly	
2022; 17th Canadian Folk Music Awards	Laura Niquay	Waska Matisiwin	
2022; 17th Canadian Folk Music Awards	Phyllis Sinclair	Ghost Bones	
2022; 17th Canadian Folk Music Awards	Morgan Toney	First Flight	
2023; 18th Canadian Folk Music Awards
2023; 18th Canadian Folk Music Awards	Amanda Rheaume	The Spaces in Between	
2023; 18th Canadian Folk Music Awards	Berk Jodoin	Half Breed	
2023; 18th Canadian Folk Music Awards	ShoShona Kish, Raven Kanatakta Polson-Lahache	Zhawenim	
2023; 18th Canadian Folk Music Awards	Kyle McKearney	Down-Home	
2023; 18th Canadian Folk Music Awards	Adrian Sutherland	When the Magic Hits	
2024; 19th Canadian Folk Music Awards
2024; 19th Canadian Folk Music Awards	Kaeley Jade Wiebe	Turpentine	
2024; 19th Canadian Folk Music Awards	Cynthia Hamar	Joint & Marrow	
2024; 19th Canadian Folk Music Awards	Kyle McKearney	A Traveler's Lament	
2024; 19th Canadian Folk Music Awards	Qattuu	Midnight Sun	
2024; 19th Canadian Folk Music Awards	Geneviève Toupin	Maison vent	
2025; 20th Canadian Folk Music Awards
2025; 20th Canadian Folk Music Awards	Alan Syliboy and the Thundermakers	Marks on the Ground	
2025; 20th Canadian Folk Music Awards	Celeigh Cardinal	Boundless Possibilities	
2025; 20th Canadian Folk Music Awards	Jason Burnstick, Nadia Burnstick	Made of Sin	
2025; 20th Canadian Folk Music Awards	Gabrielle Fontaine (Indian City)	Tomorrow	
2025; 20th Canadian Folk Music Awards	Mimi O'Bonsawin	Live in Concert	
2026; 21st Canadian Folk Music Awards
2026; 21st Canadian Folk Music Awards	Aysanabee	Edge of the Earth	
2026; 21st Canadian Folk Music Awards	PIQSIQ	Legends	
2026; 21st Canadian Folk Music Awards	Asiah Holm	The Mask That You Made	
2026; 21st Canadian Folk Music Awards	Wyatt C. Louis	Chandler	
2026; 21st Canadian Folk Music Awards	Amanda Rheaume	The Truth We Hold	
