= Hill Kourkoutis =

- Born: Hillary Kourkoutis; January 23, 1988; Toronto, Ontario, Canada
- Genres: Rock; pop; alternative; roots; R&B
- Occupations: Record producer; songwriter; audio engineer; mixer; musician; director
- Instruments: Vocals; guitar; bass; keyboards; drums
- Years active: 2000–present
- Website: hillkourkoutis.com

Hill Kourkoutis (born January 23, 1988) is a Canadian record producer, songwriter, audio engineer, multi-instrumentalist, and director. In 2022, she became the first woman to win the Juno Award for Recording Engineer of the Year, having also been the first woman nominated in the category.

Kourkoutis has produced, engineered, or mixed albums for artists including Aysanabee, Digging Roots, SATE, Leela Gilday, Amanda Rheaume, The Cliks, and Martha and the Muffins. Several of these albums have received Juno Awards or nominations: Leela Gilday's North Star Calling (2021) won the Juno Award for Indigenous Artist or Group of the Year, while Digging Roots' Zhawenim (2022) won the Juno Award for Contemporary Indigenous Artist of the Year. Aysanabee's Watin (2022), which Kourkoutis produced, reached the Polaris Music Prize shortlist in 2023 and his album Edge Of The Earth (2025), which Kourkoutis contributed a two songs to won the Alternative Album of the Year and Juno Award for Contemporary Indigenous Artist of the Year.

Earlier in her career, she had a recurring role as drummer Megan on the television series Radio Free Roscoe (2004–2005). As a touring musician, she has performed with Serena Ryder, The Weeknd, and Martha and the Muffins. She also appeared in the house band for the CTV music competition series The Launch (2018–2019).

== Early life and education ==
Kourkoutis was born in Toronto and raised in Greenwood, a small hamlet east of the city. She is of Greek descent; her father's family is from Palaiokomi, her maternal grandfather was from the island of Lefkada and her parents grew up in Athens.

Kourkoutis began guitar lessons at age eight at Durham Music, followed by piano lessons a year later. In sixth grade, she enrolled at Trafalgar Castle School, a private girls' school in Whitby, where she deepened her studies in piano, vocal performance, and music theory through The Royal Conservatory of Music syllabus. While in Grade 7, she formed her first band, The Sirens, with schoolmates including future country singer Meghan Patrick.

At age 16, Kourkoutis was cast in the television series Radio Free Roscoe (2004–2005) after the producers needed a girl who could play drums. The experience of working on a film set sparked her interest in pursuing formal studies in the field. After graduating from Trafalgar Castle, she attended Toronto Metropolitan University (formerly Ryerson University), where she received a Bachelor of Fine Arts with honours in Film Studies.

== Career ==
=== Music production ===
Kourkoutis works primarily out of her studio, The Lair, in Toronto. Her production and engineering work spans multiple genres.

She produced and mixed Leela Gilday's North Star Calling (2019), which was nominated for Juno Award for Contemporary Roots Album of the Year and took the Juno Award for Indigenous Artist or Group of the Year. Her breakthrough came with SATE's The Fool (2021), which earned her the historic Juno nomination and win for Juno Award for Recording Engineer of the Year. The album was also nominated for Alternative Album of the Year and appeared on the 2022 Polaris Music Prize long list.

In 2023, two albums she produced competed against each other in the Juno Award for Contemporary Indigenous Artist of the Year category: Digging Roots' Zhawenim (which won) and Aysanabee's Watin. Watin reached the Polaris Prize shortlist, and its single "Nomads" reached number one on the Canadian alternative rock charts. In 2024, Kourkoutis received a nomination for the Jack Richardson Producer of the Year Award and in 2025 a nomination for Juno Award for Recording Engineer of the Year.

Kourkoutis produced, co-wrote and mixed several songs on Aysanabee's album Edge of the Earth which won two Junos for Alternative Album of the Year and Juno Award for Indigenous Artist or Group of the Year. She also contributed co-production, mixing and co-writing to the song "Ghost" from Lovechild by Sebastian Gaskin which was nominated for Juno Award for Indigenous Artist or Group of the Year.

She has also written songs for artists including Royal Wood, Meghan Patrick, and Martha and the Muffins.

=== Performing and touring ===
Before focusing on production, Kourkoutis performed in several bands, including the alternative pop/rock duo Drowning Girl with David Paoli. She later formed Hill & The Sky Heroes, a collaborative solo project whose sound was described as "alien surf rock." The group released an EP on November 11, 2011 (11EP), followed by the full-length album 11:11 in June 2012, which featured contributions from Serena Ryder, Martha and the Muffins, Donna Grantis, and producer Adrian Eccleston. A trilogy of EPs titled The Great Year followed in 2015.

As a session musician and touring guitarist, she has performed with Serena Ryder, The Weeknd, Martha and the Muffins, Danny Michel, SATE, The Cliks, and Tara Slone. In 2018–2019, she appeared in the house band for the CTV series The Launch, created by Scott Borchetta.

=== Composing for media ===
Kourkoutis has composed music for children's television, including the theme song for Dino Ranch and Remy & Boo and songs for Thomas & Friends: All Engines Go.

In 2025, she was selected as one of the remix artists for the 2026 FIFA World Cup official theme, representing Toronto.

=== Film and television ===
At age 16, Kourkoutis was cast in a recurring role on the television series Radio Free Roscoe (2004–2005), which aired on Noggin in the United States and The Family Channel in Canada. She played Megan, the drummer for the show's fictional band.

She has directed music videos for artists including Serena Ryder, Mother Mother, Sass Jordan, and Alex Cuba.

== Discography ==
=== Selected production credits ===
| Year | Artist | Album | Credits | Notes |
|---|---|---|---|---|
| 2013 | The Cliks | Black Tie Elevator | Producer, engineer, musician, co-writer | |
| 2019 | Leela Gilday | North Star Calling | Producer, mixer, engineer, musician | Juno Award winner; nominated for Contemporary Roots Album of the Year |
| 2019 | Madison Violet | Everything's Shifting | Co-producer, mixer, engineer, musician | |
| 2021 | SATE | The Fool | Producer, mixer, engineer, musician, co-writer | Nominated for Alternative Album of the Year; Polaris Music Prize long list |
| 2021 | Martha and the Muffins | Marthology: In and Outtakes | Co-producer, musician, co-writer | "Act Like A Woman" (co-writer), "Big Day" and "Echo Beach (30th Anniversary Version)" |
| 2022 | Aysanabee | Watin | Producer, mixer, engineer, musician | Nominated for Juno Award for Contemporary Indigenous Artist of the Year; Polaris Music Prize shortlist. "Nomads" #1 on Canadian Alternative Rock Charts. |
| 2022 | Digging Roots | Zhawenim | Co-producer, mixer, engineer, musician, co-writer | Juno Award winner |
| 2022 | Amanda Rheaume | The Spaces in Between | Producer, mixer, engineer, musician, co-writer | |
| 2025 | Sebastian Gaskin | Lovechild | Co-producer, mixer, engineer, musician, co-writer | "Ghost". Nominated for Juno Award for Contemporary Indigenous Artist of the Year |
| 2025 | Aysanabee | Edge Of The Earth | Producer, mixer, engineer, musician, co-writer | "Gone Baby Gone" and "Dream Catcher". Album won Alternative Album of the Year and Juno Award for Contemporary Indigenous Artist of the Year |

=== Selected remixes ===
- Jill Barber – "Girl's Gotta Do (Hill Kourkoutis Remix)" (2018)
- Good Lovelies – "I See Gold (Radio Remix)" (2018)
- FIFA Sound x Hill Kourkoutis – "Toronto Theme (FIFA World Cup 26™️)" (2025)

== Filmography ==
=== Television ===
| Year | Title | Role | Notes |
|---|---|---|---|
| 2004–2005 | Radio Free Roscoe | Megan | Recurring role, 10 episodes |
| 2018–2019 | The Launch | Herself (house band guitarist) | 14 episodes |

=== Selected music videos (as director) ===
- Mother Mother – "Hayloft" (2009)
- Sass Jordan – "Why Did You?" (2009)
- Serena Ryder – "All For Love" (2009)
- Alex Cuba – "If You Give Me Love" (2009)
- Crystal Shawanda – "I'll Be Home for Christmas" (2009)
- Serena Ryder & The Beauties – "Ramblin' Man", "No Air", "The Funeral" (2010)

== Awards and nominations ==
| Award | Year | Category | Nominee/work | Result | Ref |
|---|---|---|---|---|---|
| Juno Awards | 2022 | Recording Engineer of the Year | "Howler" (SATE), "The Drought" (Tania Joy) | Won | |
| Juno Awards | 2024 | Jack Richardson Producer of the Year Award | "Ego Death" (Aysanabee), "Whiskey Bar" (Tafari Anthony) | Nominated | |
| Juno Awards | 2025 | Recording Engineer of the Year | "Ghost" (Sebastian Gaskin), "Should We" (Emi Jeen) | Nominated | |
