= Siibii =

Canadian singer-songwriter

Siibii is a Cree singer-songwriter from Mistissini, Quebec, Canada. They are most noted for their 2025 EP Siibii, which earned them a Juno Award nomination for Contemporary Indigenous Artist of the Year at the Juno Awards of 2026.

Formerly known as Angel Baribeau, Siibii released the EP For Those I Love(d) in 2020, and was a finalist in CBC Music's annual Searchlight competition for unsigned musical artists in 2022. Later that year, they announced that they were changing their legal name to Siibii Petawabano, the family name of their mother, and their performing name to Siibii. They subsequently released "YOY", their first single as Siibii.

They signed to Amanda Rheaume's Ishkode Records in 2025, releasing their self-titled EP that year.

They are non-binary.

In 2026, Siibii was the winner of the RBC Emerging Artist award at the Governor General's Performing Arts Awards.

== Discography ==
=== Extended plays ===
Title	EP details
Siibii	Released: November 14, 2025; Label: Ishkode Records; Format: Digital download

=== Singles ===
==== As lead artist ====
Title	Year	Album/EP
"YOY"	2024	Siibii
"Nightmare"	2024	Siibii
"User"	2025	Siibii
"Stars"	2025	Siibii
"Body to Body" (featuring Aysanabee)	2025	Siibii
"Don't Wake Me Up"	2025	Siibii

==== As featured artist ====
Title	Year	Album/EP
"So Right" (Aspects featuring Siibii)	2025	Non-album single
