= Celeigh Cardinal =

Canadian folk singer-songwriter

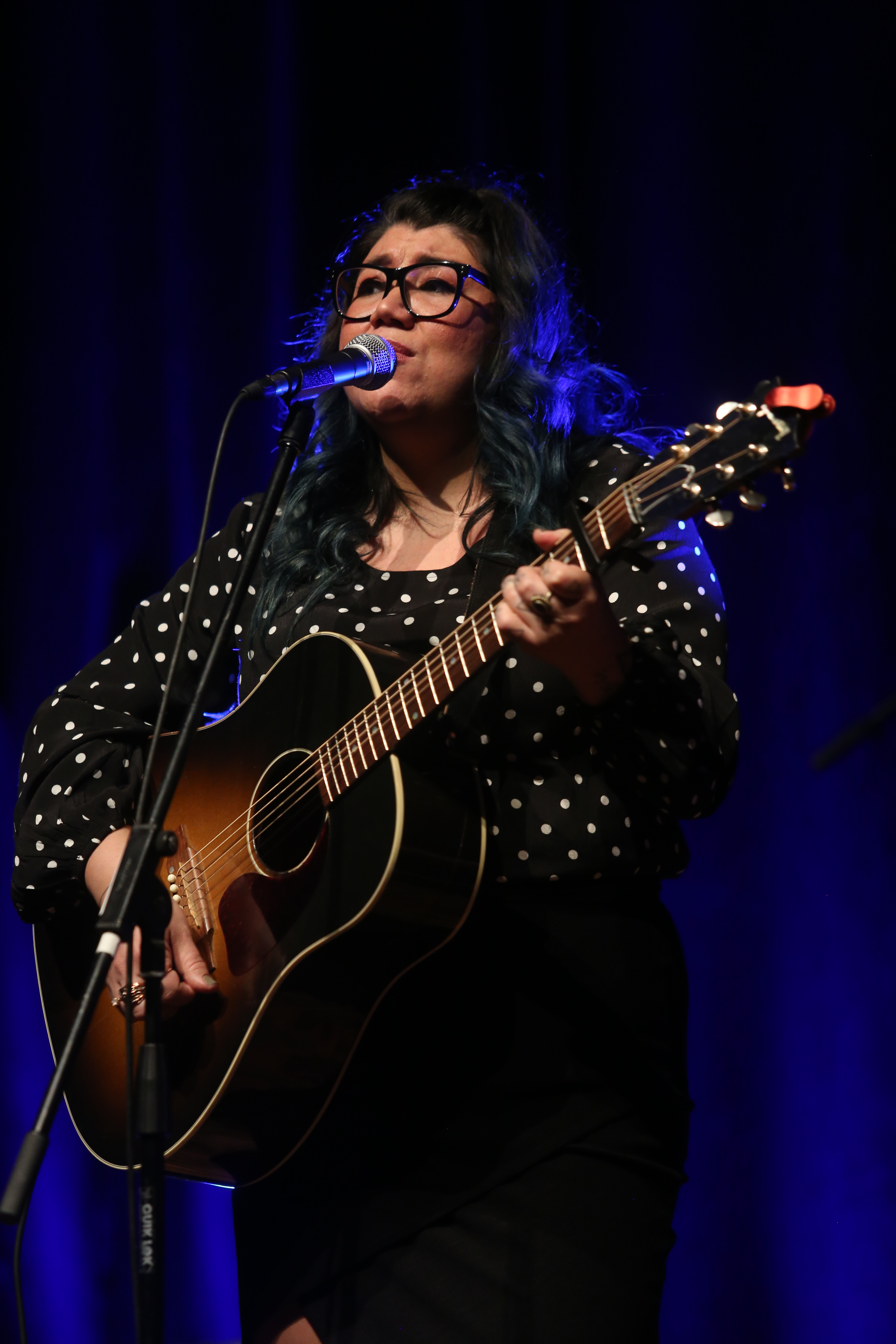
- Cardinal in 2019

Background information
- Origin: Edmonton, Alberta, Canada
- Website: www.celeighcardinal.com

Celeigh Cardinal is a Cree and Métis folk singer-songwriter from Alberta. She is most noted for her 2019 album Stories from a Downtown Apartment, which won the Juno Award for Indigenous Music Album of the Year at the Juno Awards of 2020. On June 25, 2020, the album also earned Cardinal two Western Canadian Music Awards for Songwriter of the Year and Indigenous Artist of the Year.

== Life and career ==
Celeigh has been singing on stages since she was four years old. She started performing professionally at 19. “I grew up singing in church,” she says, “I always knew I wanted to be a singer.”

Based in Edmonton, she released an EP in 2011 before following up with her full-length debut album Everything and Nothing at All in 2017. The album received a nomination for Best Pop Album at the Indigenous Music Awards in 2018, and seven nominations at that year's Edmonton Music Awards. She won two Edmonton Music Awards, for Female Artist and Indigenous Recording. She received a second Indigenous Music Award nomination in 2019, in the category Best Radio Single for her song "There Ain't No Way".

Celeigh Cardinal is currently recording from Maskwacis just south of Edmonton, as a host on the CKUA Radio Network for the show "Full Circle", which celebrates Indigenous music from around the globe.

At the 20th Canadian Folk Music Awards in 2025, she won the award for Indigenous Songwriter of the Year for Boundless Possibilities, in a tie with Alan Syliboy. For the same album, she was nominated for two 2025 Juno Awards, in the Contemporary Indigenous Artist of the Year and Adult Contemporary Album of the Year categories.

== Discography ==
- Everything and Nothing at All (2017)
- Stories from a Downtown Apartment (2019)
- Boundless Possibilities (2024)
