= Alan Syliboy =

Canadian Mi'kmaq artist

Alan Syliboy (born 8 September 1952) is a Mi'kmaw artist, author, and musician from Millbrook First Nation in Nova Scotia, Canada. Syliboy began working in various artistic mediums beginning in the 1970s, including painting, mixed media, illustration and video. He has also published books and created films and music. His work is influenced by Mi’kmaw petroglyphs, particularly those located in Kejimkujik National Park, as well as quillwork and Mi'kmaw traditional oral stories. His work has been exhibited a numerous galleries across Canada and the world. A proponent of making art accessible, particularly within his own community, Syliboy designed T-shirts and paints drums. Syliboy also creates murals, with his work featured in the main terminal at Halifax Stanfield airport. Syliboy presented his portrait of Grand Chief Membertou to Queen Elizabeth II during her visit to Halifax in 2010. The portrait is on permanent display at Government House in Halifax. Syliboy received the Queen's Golden Jubilee Medal in 2002. Sylliboy continues to live in Millbrook First Nation and his studio is based in Truro.

== Early life ==
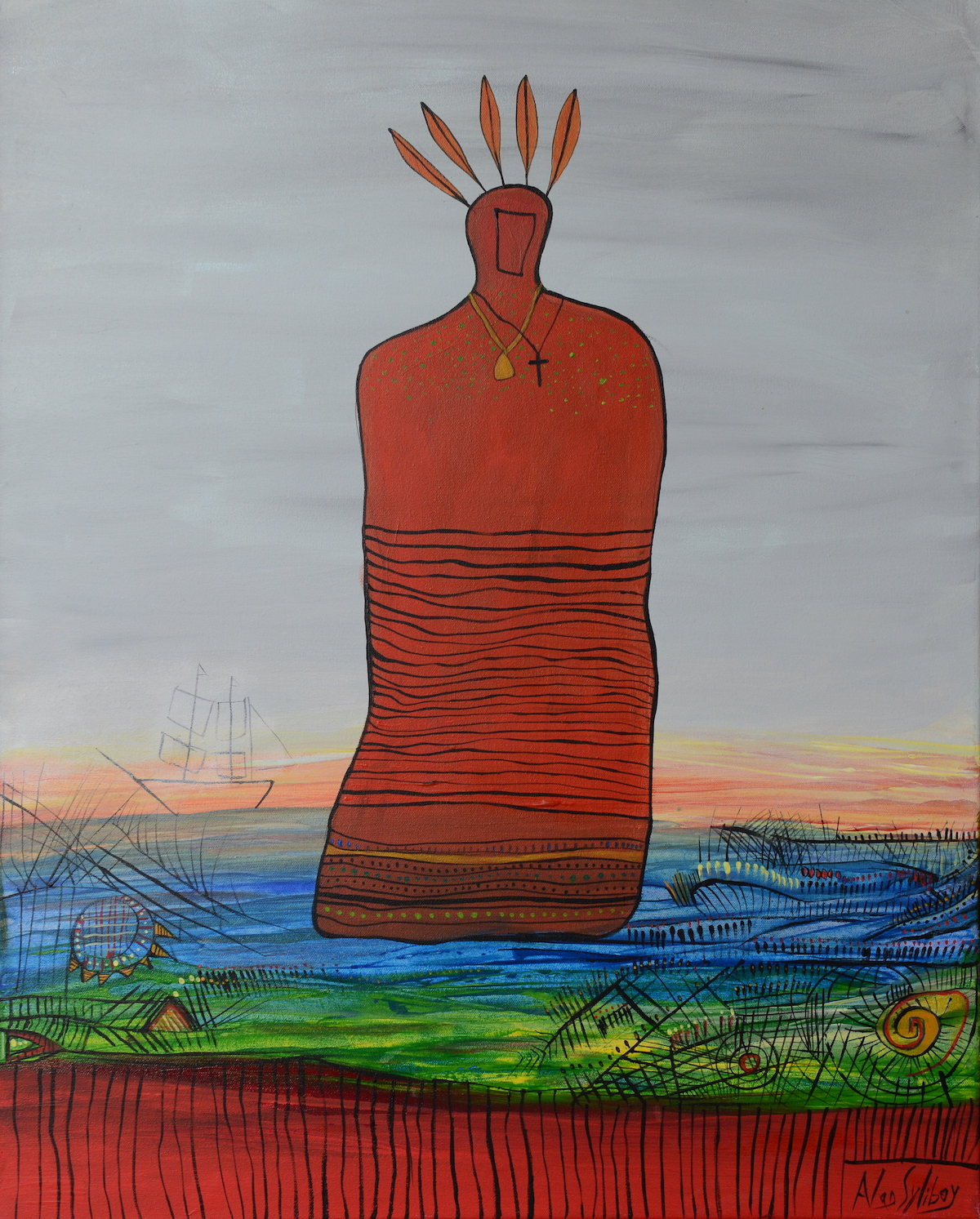
Alan Syliboy's painting of Grand Chief Henri Membertou

Syliboy was born 8 September 1952 in Millbrook First Nation near Truro, Nova Scotia. He often went from Millbrook to Truro with his grandmother to sell baskets. Syliboy began drawing as a child and cites his grandparents as an early influence, encouraging him to become an artist. Syliboy left school in grade nine and was working at his uncle's cabinet shop. He met and was mentored by Wolastoqiyik artist Shirley Bear in the 1970s when she came to Millbrook to host workshops and recruit artists. He credits the project with giving him his first paint set and he studied with her privately in 1972. Although he was interested in pursuing art, it took a him a few years to find his path, later taking up studies at the Nova Scotia College of Art & Design.

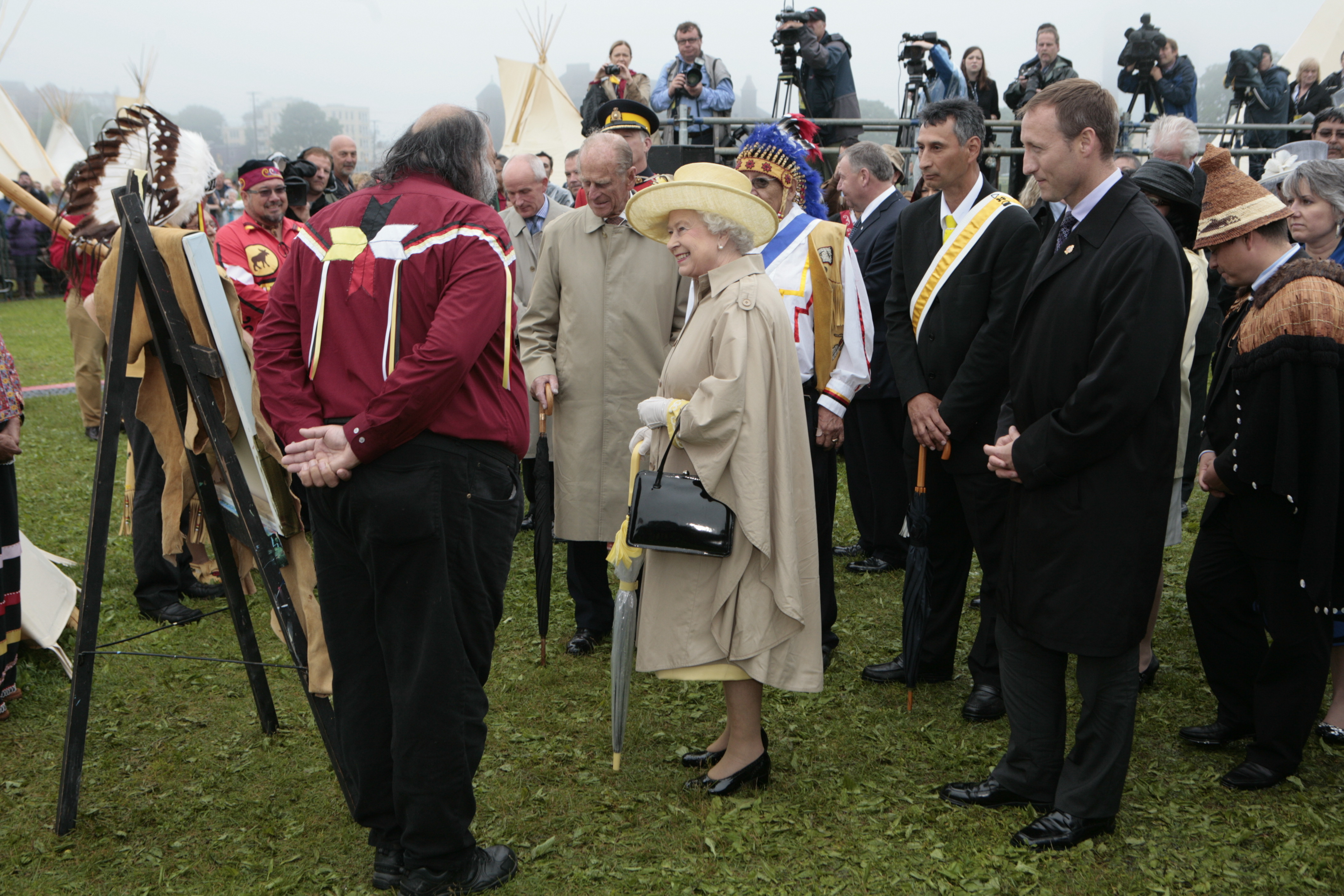
Artist Alan Syliboy presenting his portrait of Grand Chief Membertou to Queen Elizabeth II

== Career ==
Syliboy's art, a butterfly design, was featured on a two-hundred dollar gold coin minted by the Royal Canadian Mint in 1999 as part of a series entitled Celebrating Canadian Native Cultures and Traditions. Syliboy received the Queen's Jubilee Medal in 2002.

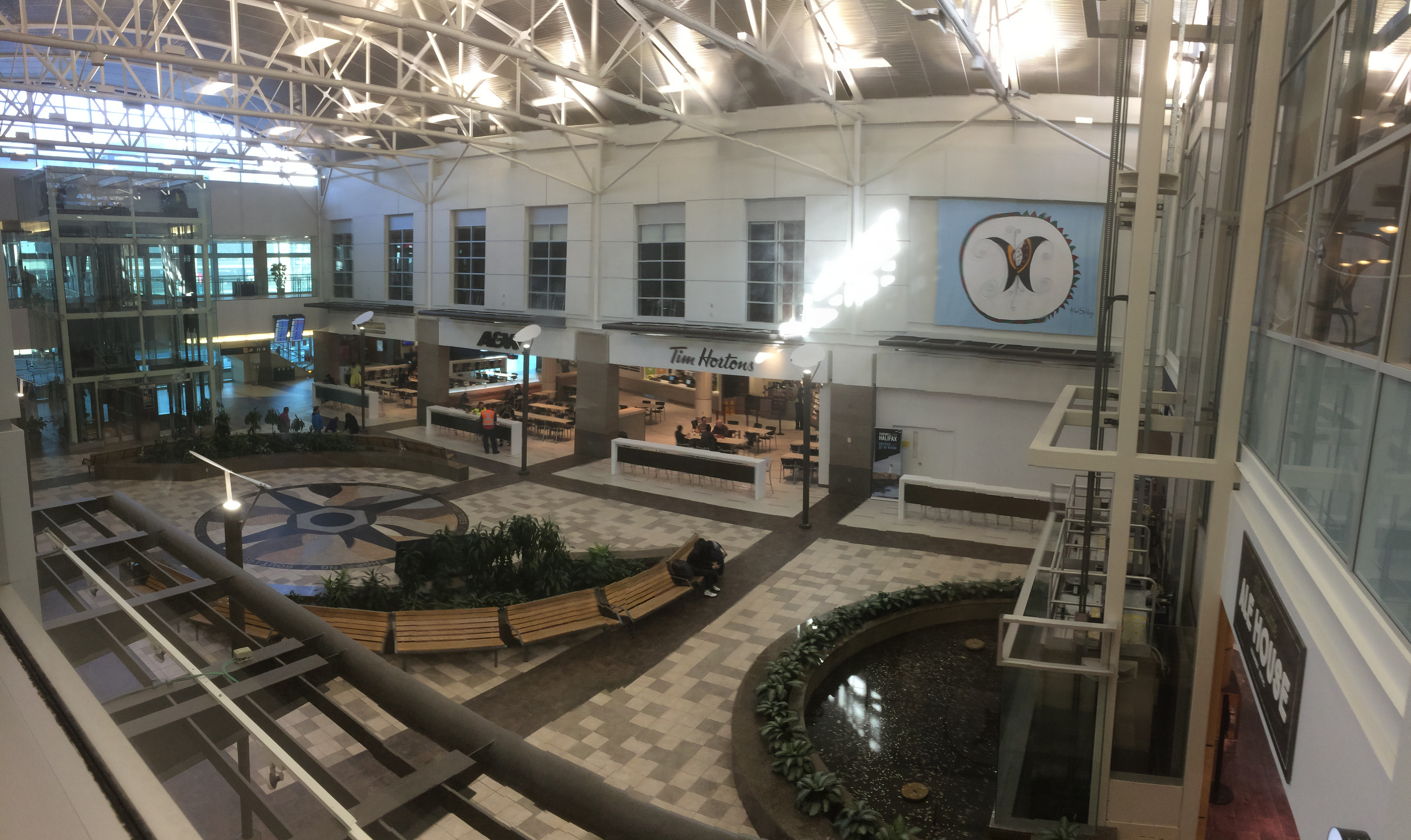
Main lobby of the Halifax Stanfield International Airport featuring a mural by artist Alan Syliboy

Syliboy had a solo exhibition at the Beaverbrook Art Gallery in 2013 called The Thundermaker. Also in 2013, A mural featuring a butterfly, entitled 3D Butterfly, was installed in the main lobby of the Halifax Stanfield International Airport. The work was created through a partnership between the airport and the province of Nova Scotia and painted over three days in August 9–11, 2013. The event was a feature event and live-streamed over Twitter and Facebook. Syliboy stated the butterfly was chosen as the subject because people are always coming and going at airports, and they can be very emotional places. Further, the mural "depicts a butterfly/man and is done with the double curve motif which symbolizes life. The butterfly represents the freedom of the soul to wander and it flies in the ray of Grandfather Sun, the giver of life." Filmmaker Nance Ackerman captured the process and the painting became central to her short film Carry Me Home. The film features music by Jamie Alcorn and performed by Lone Cloud, Syliboy's band. The mural, painted on canvas, toured Nova Scotia in 2015 and was exhibited at St. Francis Xavier University, and Creamery Square, Tatamagouche. The mural has been cited a main attraction of the airport.

In 2017, Syliboy was awarded an honorary doctorate from St. Francis Xavier University.

Syliboy has had his work exhibited across Canada and his work was featured in a major retrospective at the Dalhousie University Art Gallery in 2024.

Syliboy was selected as the winner of the 2024 Portia White Prize, a prize that recognizes the artistic "significant" contribution of a Nova Scotian artist to the province.

At the 20th Canadian Folk Music Awards in 2025, he won the award for Indigenous Songwriter of the Year for Marks on the Ground, in a tie with Celeigh Cardinal. In the same year he contributed a cover of Joel Plaskett's "Nowhere with You", featuring a mix of the original English and translated indigenous language lyrics, to the Plaskett tribute album Songs from the Gang.

In January 2026 an international arrivals area at the Halifax airport opened and featured Syliboy's artwork.
