= Morgan Toney =

Folk singer-songwriter from Nova Scotia, Canada

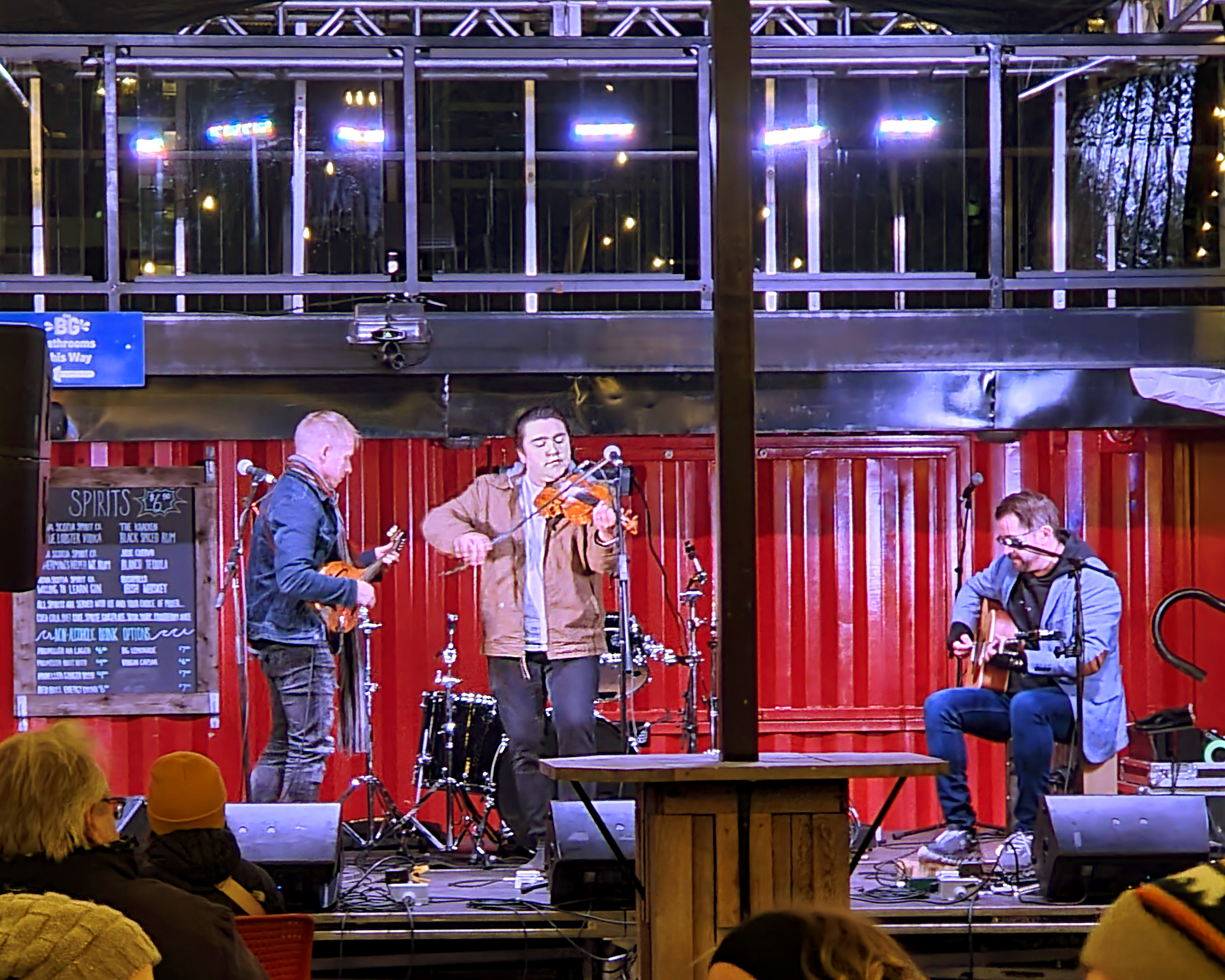
Morgan Toney (centre) performing with musicians

Morgan Toney is a Mi'kmaq folk singer-songwriter and fiddler from Nova Scotia, Canada, whose music blends Celtic folk and traditional Mi'kmaq music. He is a member of the Wagmatcook First Nation.

Toney began his musical career as a drummer, but began learning the fiddle in the late 2010s. He met singer-songwriter Keith Mullins, with whom he planned to record an album but found their plans halted by the COVID-19 pandemic. He made his debut at the virtual edition of the Celtic Colours festival in 2020, sharing the stage with Ashley MacIsaac.

Toney and Mullins then launched a GoFundMe page to assist in the recording of Toney's debut album First Flight, which was released independently in 2021. He received a Canadian Folk Music Award nominee for Indigenous Songwriter of the Year at the 17th Canadian Folk Music Awards in 2022, and First Flight was reissued in March 2022 on Ishkōdé Records, a record label owned and operated by Amanda Rheaume and ShoShonna Kish.

His 2023 album Resilience received a Juno Award nomination for Traditional Roots Album of the Year at the Juno Awards of 2024. At the Juno Awards of 2026, he won the same award for Heal the Divide.
