= Shawnee Kish =

Mohawk singer-songwriter based in what is known as Canada

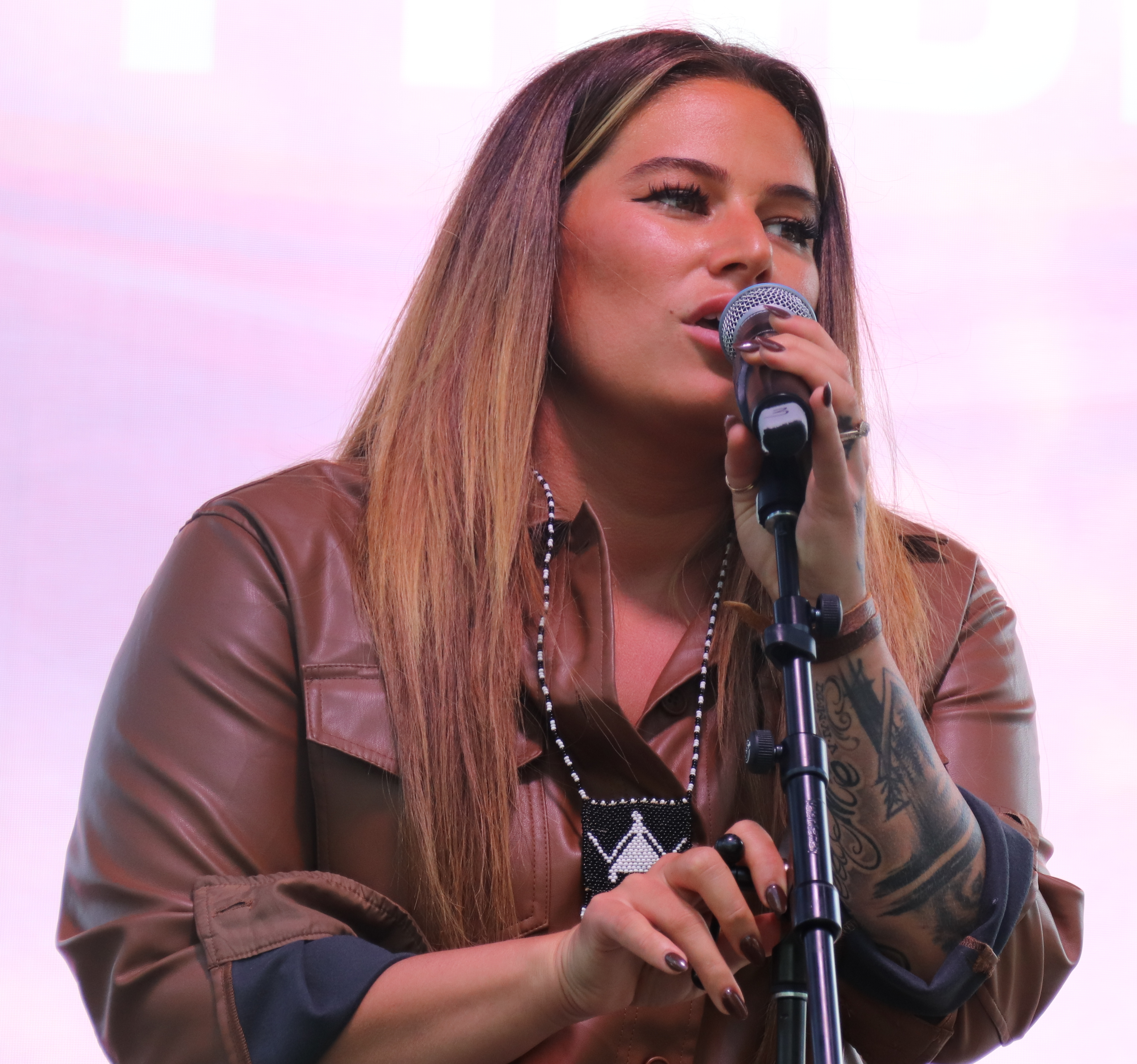

Shawnee Kish is a Mohawk singer-songwriter from Canada. She is most noted as a Juno Award nominee for Contemporary Indigenous Artist of the Year at the Juno Awards of 2022, for her self-titled debut EP.

== Career ==
Originally from Welland, Ontario, she began her career singing Shania Twain songs. She has been based in Edmonton, Alberta as an adult.

She was the winner of CBC Music's Searchlight competition in 2020, and was subsequently one of the winners of the Allan Slaight Juno Master Class program for artist development in 2021.

Her debut EP was released in 2021. In the same year she was the creator of "Music Is My Medicine", a symphonic work which was performed by the National Arts Centre Orchestra for the CBC Gem web series Undisrupted.

In 2023, she participated in an all-star recording of Serena Ryder's single "What I Wouldn't Do", which was released as a charity single to benefit Kids Help Phone's Feel Out Loud campaign for youth mental health. In the same year she released the EP Revolution, which received Juno Award nominations for Contemporary Indigenous Artist of the Year and Adult Alternative Album of the Year at the Juno Awards of 2024.

Her debut album, Chapter One, was released in 2025.

== Personal life ==
She identifies as two-spirit, and married Olympic rugby player Jen Kish in 2021, in a ceremony officiated by Rachel Notley.
