= Dino Ranch =

Canadian animated TV series

- Promotional poster
- Genre: Action-adventure; Comedy; Western
- Created by: Matthew Fernandes
- Voices of: Tyler Nathan; Jacob Soley; Jayd Deroché; Ava Ro; Jacob Mazeral; Elliott Couillard; Scott Gorman; Athena Karkanis; Joshua Graham
- Theme music composer: Serena Ryder; Hill Kourkoutis
- Composer: Lorenzo Castelli
- Country of origin: Canada
- Original language: English
- No. of seasons: 3
- No. of episodes: 65 (130 segments) (list of episodes)

Production
- Executive producers: Arthur Spanos; Matthew Fernandes; Tammy Semen; Jon Rutherford; Bob Higgins; David Fortier; Ivan Schneeberg
- Producers: Anna Keenan; Stephanie Gauthier Watson; Pascale LeBlanc
- Running time: 22 minutes
- Production companies: Jam Filled Entertainment; Industrial Brothers; Boat Rocker Studios

Original release
- Network: CBC Kids
- Release: January 16, 2021 – April 29, 2024

Dino Ranch is a Canadian animated children's television series created by Matthew Fernandes, co-founder and chief creative officer of Industrial Brothers. Dino Ranch follows the adventures of the Cassidy family as they tackle life on the ranch in a fantastical, prehistoric and Wild West-inspired setting where dinosaurs roam.

The series debuted in 2021, on CBC in Canada on January 16, on Disney Junior in the United States on January 18, and later on Disney+ on June 18. The second season of the series premiered on Disney Junior on July 22, 2022, followed by the third and final season on September 11, 2023.

A spin-off series, Dino Ranch: Island Explorers, was released in 2025.

== Premise ==
Dino Ranch is set in a world where humans and dinosaurs live alongside each other. While Dino Ranch is first and foremost a working, self-sustained ranch run by the Cassidy family, it also serves as a dinosaur sanctuary.

== Characters ==
Dino Ranch is operated by the Cassidy family, consisting of Bo and Jane Cassidy and their 3 children, Jon, Min, and Miguel, and dinosaurs.

=== Main ===
- Jon (voiced by Tyler Nathan in Season 1, Jacob Soley in Season 2 and Jayd Deroché in Season 3) is the oldest kid in the Cassidy family, the leader of the three siblings and rides Blitz, the speedy Velociraptor. Jon is an aspiring dino-trainer who is an expert on dinosaurs, and a terrific athlete.
- Min (voiced by Ava Ro) is the middle child in the Cassidy family who is the only member of the trio who is female and rides Clover, the loving Brontosaurus. Min is a dino-doctor in training and uses her medical expertise to help any sick or injured dino who needs Dino Ranch's help. Sometimes Min will be the leader of the Dino Ranchers and the Flyer and Rescue Squad instead of Jon.
- Miguel (voiced by Jacob Mazeral) is the youngest child in the Cassidy family, and rides Tango, the tiny but mighty Triceratops. Miguel is an inventor and loves to build things, especially new inventions he's come up with.
- Blitz (voiced by Joshua Graham) is Jon's best buddy and the fastest Velociraptor around.
- Clover (voiced by Deven Mack) is a bighearted Brontosaurus and Min's dino-doctor assistant.
- Tango (voiced by Athena Karkanis) is a mighty Triceratops who loves to bash things and has incredible strength. She is Miguel's best friend and helps him build things.
- Bo (or "Pa" to the Dino Ranchers) (voiced by Scott Gorman) is the father of Jon, Min, and Miguel, and husband of Jane. He is an expert rancher and tends to the dino herds with his T-Rex, Biscuit.
- Jane (or "Ma" to the Dino Ranchers) (also voiced by Athena Karkanis) is the mother of Jon, Min, and Miguel, and wife of Bo. She is the head dino doctor of the ranch and runs the Hatchery with her Parasaur, Quack.
- Biscuit is Bo's Tyrannosaurus and the lead dinosaur of Dino Ranch.
- Quack is Jane's Parasaurolophus and her dino-doctor assistant.
- Thunderbolt is a Dimorphodon who's as fast as lightning & is Jon and Blitz's flying partner who has a Turbo-Claw.
- Cloud is a gentle Thalassodromeus who is Min and Clover's flying partner who has a Dino Buggy.
- Twister is a mighty Tapejara who is Miguel and Tango's flying partner who wields a Dino-Digger.

=== Recurring ===
- Thunderfoot is a towering Spinosaurus with a big appetite, this dino is the king of the badlands.
- Angus is the Cassidy's tough, yet temperamental field plowing Triceratops.
- Tara Dacktle (voiced by Shechniah Mpulwana) runs the Dino Airport with her dad, Zachary, and Pterodactyl pal, Wilbur. Bold, adventurous, and a bit of a daredevil, Tara's the best Pterodactyl-flyer around for when the Dino Ranchers need a helping hand from the air.
- Wilbur is Tara's high-flying Pterodactyl pal and the head of the Dino Airport's fleet of rescue Pteros. The massive pterosaur is an expert flyer and can transport all of the Dino Ranchers through the sky in his Dino Porter.
- Thundertot is Thunderfoot's child that debuted in the episode "Miguel VS Thunderfoot".
- Boomsy is a baby T-Rex who lives with Tara & her dad at the Dino Airport.
- Zachary Dacktle (or "Captain Dacktle") (voiced by Deven Mack) is Tara's Pterosaur-flying dad; an upbeat and uber-enthusiastic pioneer of Pterosaur flying. Zach is a kind and loving parent, who's also a bit flighty and his head is always in the clouds.

=== Antagonists ===
- Clara Tinhorn (voiced by Samantha Weinstein) is the oldest (despite her stature) sibling and the leader of the raptor-riding Tinhorn Trio, the Dino Ranchers' mischievous rivals. The Trio likes to mess with the Dino Ranchers and their dinosaurs, and pull nasty stunts like taking a wild T-Rex egg.
- Ike Tinhorn (voiced by Jonah Wineberg) is the middle child of the Tinhorn Trio, and likes to challenge Clara's authority.
- Ogie Tinhorn (voiced by Shayle Simons) is the youngest of the Tinhorn Trio, and while he likes to go along with his older siblings' naughty plans, he has a soft heart and occasionally helps the Dino Ranchers do the right thing as well.
- Sonny the Kid (voiced by Ian Ho) is the greatest dino rustling mastermind of all time - or so he likes to say of himself. Sonny is a dinosaur super-fan and loves pulling rustling heists so he can ride on the amazing dinosaurs he admires so much. But while he is an incredible trickster, he's a terrible rider.

== Episodes ==
Season	Segments	Episodes	Originally released	
Season	Segments	Episodes	First released	Last released
1	52	26	January 16, 2021	April 15, 2022
2	52	26	July 22, 2022	July 8, 2023
3	26	13	September 11, 2023	April 29, 2024

== Merchandise ==
Florida-based company Jazwares is Dino Ranch's global master toy partner. Scholastic Corporation has the rights to design and produce a range of English-language consumer products, including readers, sticker story books, novelty items, activity books and audio books.

On August 25, 2021, Boat Rocker announced five new merchandising partnerships for Dino Ranch, including Baby Boom Consumer Products, High Point Design, Kurt S. Adler, Rubies, and Kennedy Publishing.

== Release ==
In Canada, Dino Ranch is aired on CBC Television as well as its streaming website and mobile app CBC Gem. In the United States, the series began showing on Disney Junior and its streaming video website and app DisneyNow in January 2021, followed by Disney+ on 18 June 2021.

The series has subsequently been sold to Super RTL and Toggo Plus (Germany); Gulli, TiJi and Gulli Africa (France); NRK (Norway); YLE (Finland); Sveriges Television (Sweden); Croatian Radiotelevision (Croatia); Telewizja Polska (Poland); and DR (Denmark). On March 3, it was announced that Dino Ranch was also sold to Disney+ in the U.K., Ireland, Australia and New Zealand. In United Kingdom, it debuted on Tiny Pop in 2022. In Africa, it debuted on Boomerang on December 13, 2021. In Brazil, it was broadcast by TV Cultura in 2023.

Dino Ranch premiered on Boomerang Turkey in January 2022, before it also premiered on Cartoon Network on February 7, as part of the Cartoonito block. In the MENA, Dino Ranch premiered on Boomerang in April 2022. In Italy, Dino Ranch premiered on Cartoonito since September 6, 2021, followed by pay-TV channel Boomerang in March 2022.

In Asia, it debuted on Cartoon Network on March 28, 2022, as part of the Cartoonito block while, this show also remained in a dedicated Cartoonito programming section on the regional streaming service HBO GO in Southeast Asia, Hong Kong and Taiwan. In Japan, the show had already premiered on Disney Junior in February 2022. In Spain, the series debuted on Clan in 2022.

Dino Ranch was released on Disney Junior in the US as the number one cable series among kids, boys and girls 2–5. In six weeks after the launch of the official Dino Ranch YouTube channel, it accumulated over three million views.

== Reception ==
Dino Ranch is being adapted into a stage show by Fierylight and Terrapin Station Entertainment.

The series was one of the finalists for the audience-voted Shaw Rocket Fund Kids Choice Award, and Best Pre-School Program or Series at the 9th Canadian Screen Awards in 2021. Dino Ranch's first season was also nominated at the Rockie Awards of the Banff World Media Festival in the Preschool Animation category.

Dino Ranch was featured in Entertainment Weekly in April 2022, under "EW-approved streams for kids."

=== Awards and nominations ===
Awards
Year	Award	Category	Recipients and nominees	Result	Ref.
2022	Canadian Screen Awards	Canadian Screen Award for Best Pre-School Program or Series	Dino Ranch	Nominated	
2022	Canadian Screen Awards	Shaw Rocket Fund Kid's Choice Award	Dino Ranch	Nominated	
2022	Banff World Media Festival	Best Animation: Preschool	Dino Ranch	Nominated	
2022	Cynopsis Media Awards	Best Animation: Preschool	Dino Ranch	Won	
2023	Canadian Screen Awards	Best Writing, Pre-School	Richard Young - Light Touch Tango	Nominated	
2023	Canadian Screen Awards	Shaw Rocket Fund Kid's Choice Award	Dino Ranch	Nominated	
2023	Writers Guild of Canada	WGC Screenwriting Awards - Preschool	Ben Joseph & Mike D'Ascenzo - Wings Over Dino Ranch	Won	
2023	Banff World Media Festival	Best Animation: Preschool	Dino Ranch	Nominated	
2023	GLAAD Award	Outstanding Kids & Family Programming	Adoptasaurus Rex	Won	

== Spin-off ==
A spin-off, Dino Ranch: Island Explorers, was released in 2025. The spin-off follows the original characters as they venture to Dino Island, an exotic island where their uncle lives.

== See also ==
- Firebuds
- Eureka!
