= Berk Jodoin =

Canadian singer-songwriter

Berk Jodoin is a Canadian folk and country singer-songwriter from Leader, Saskatchewan. He is most noted as a Canadian Folk Music Award nominee for Indigenous Songwriter of the Year at the 18th Canadian Folk Music Awards.

Of Métis-Cree descent, Jodoin released his self-titled debut album in 2020, and followed up in 2022 with Half-Breed.
