= Fort Macleod =

Fort Macleod Macleod (1884–1952)
- Town
- Town of Fort Macleod
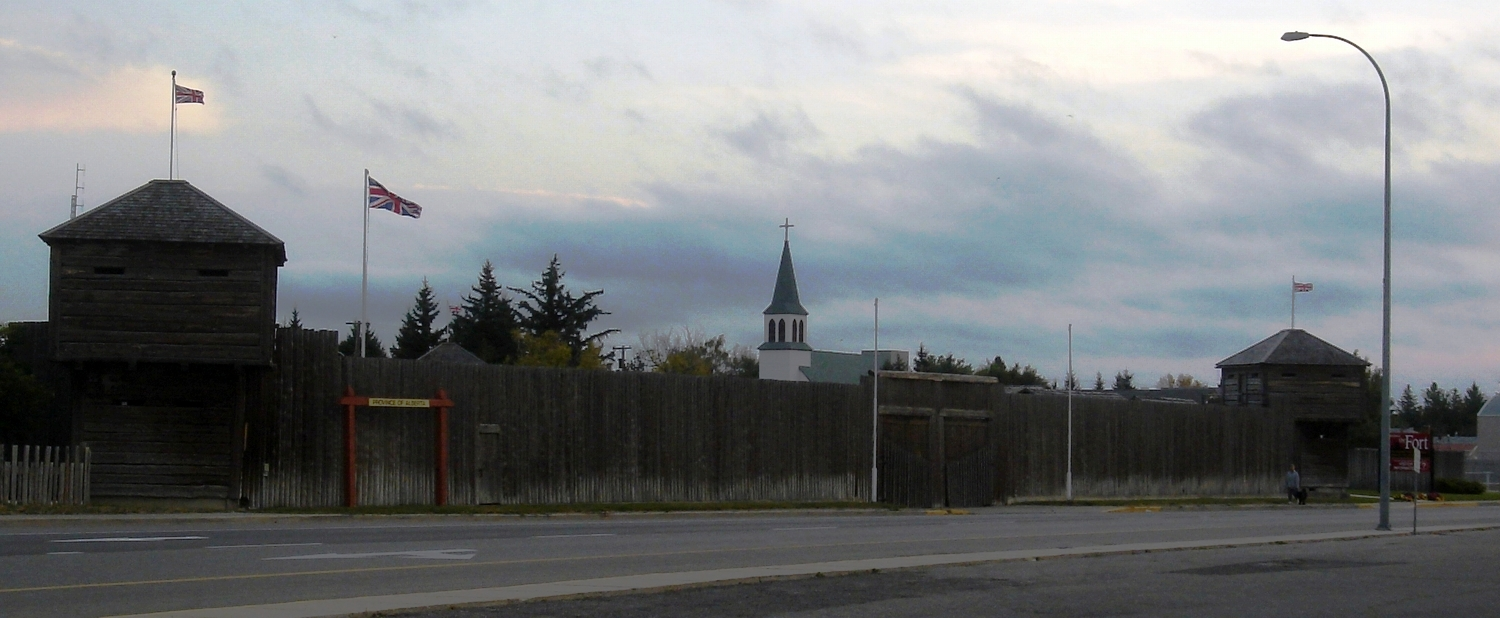
- The NWMP fort in Fort Macleod, which is now a museum

- Location of Fort Macleod in Alberta
- Coordinates: 49°43′32″N 113°23′51″W
- Country: Canada
- Province: Alberta
- Region: Southern Alberta
- Census division: 3
- Municipal district: Municipal District of Willow Creek No. 26
- Public School Authority: Livingstone Range School Division
- Incorporated
  - Town: December 31, 1892 (as Macleod)
  - Name change: April 1, 1952

Government
  - Mayor: Brent Feyter
  - Governing body: Fort Macleod Town Council
  - Elected Council (2025): Christina Gail Fox C. Aaron Poytress Jim Monteith Shawn Patience Jeemeet Patel
  - Manager: Anthony Burdett
  - MP: John Barlow (Foothills)
  - MLA: Chelsae Petrovic (Livingstone-Macleod)

Area (2021)
  - Land: 22.54 km^{2} (8.70 sq mi)
- Elevation: 945 m (3,100 ft)

Population (2021)
  - Total: 3,297
  - Density: 146.2/km^{2} (379/sq mi)
- Time zone: UTC−06:00 (Alberta Time)
- Postal code span: T0L
- Area code: +1-403
- Website: Official website

Fort Macleod (/məˈklaʊd/ mə-KLOWD) is a town in southern Alberta, Canada. It was originally named Macleod to distinguish it from the North-West Mounted Police barracks (Fort Macleod, built 1874) it had grown around. The fort was named in honour of the then Commissioner of the North-West Mounted Police, Colonel James Macleod. Founded as the Municipality of the Town of Macleod in 1892, the name was officially changed to the already commonly used "Fort Macleod" in 1952.

== History ==
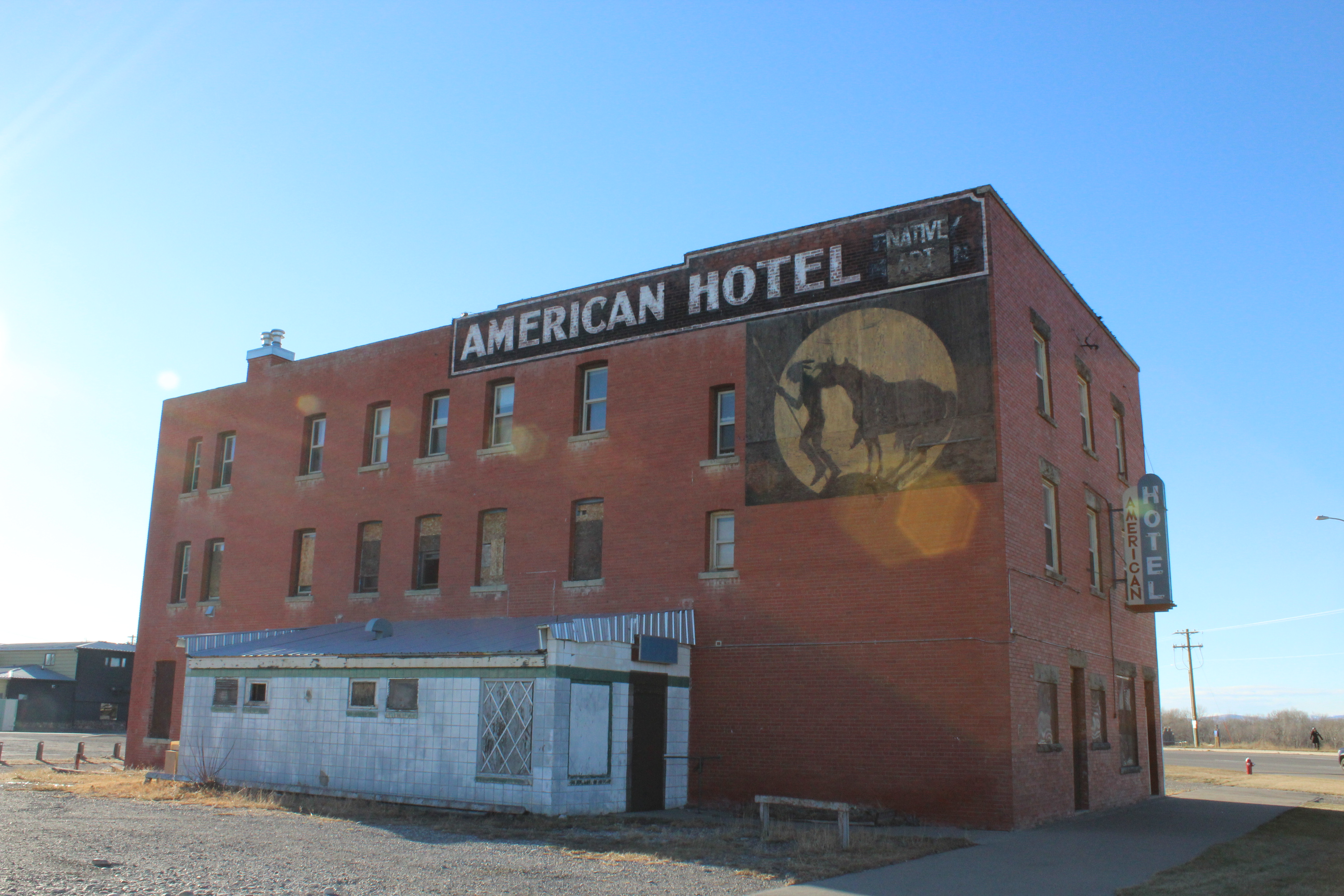
The historic American Hotel

The fort was built as a 70-by-70-metre (230 ft × 230 ft) square on October 18, 1874. The east side held the men's quarters and the west side held those of the Mounties. Buildings such as hospitals, stores and guardrooms were in the south end. Stables and the blacksmith's shop were in the north end.

The town grew on the location of the Fort Macleod North-West Mounted Police (NWMP) Barracks, the second headquarters of the NWMP after Fort Livingstone was abandoned in 1876. Fort Macleod was originally established in 1874 on a peninsula along the Oldman River, then moved in 1884 to the present town location. The Museum of the North-West Mounted Police is located in Fort Macleod.

Once agricultural settlement and the railway came to the region, Macleod boomed. The town became a divisional point for the Canadian Pacific Railway and frontier wood construction began to be replaced by brick and sandstone. In 1906, a fire devastated the downtown and destroyed most of the wooden buildings. From 1906 to 1912, Macleod had its greatest period of growth, as more new brick and stone building replaced the destroyed wooden ones. Then in 1912, the CPR moved the divisional point and 200 jobs to Lethbridge, devastating the local economy. Fort Macleod ceased to grow, and in 1924 was forced to declare bankruptcy. Until the 1970s, the town's economy stagnated and the buildings from the turn-of-the-century remained untouched.

In 1978, Alberta Culture started to inventory the downtown buildings, and in 1982, the downtown became Alberta's first "Provincial Historic Area". As well, Heritage Canada started a Main Street Restoration Project in 1982, aiming to preserve the sandstone and brick buildings, some dating back to 1878.

== Demographics ==
In the 2021 Census of Population conducted by Statistics Canada, the Town of Fort Macleod had a population of 3,297 living in 1,342 of its 1,440 total private dwellings, a change of 11.1% from its 2016 population of 2,967. With a land area of 22.54 km^{2} (8.70 sq mi), it had a population density of 146.3/km^{2} (378.8/sq mi) in 2021.

In the 2016 Census of Population conducted by Statistics Canada, the Town of Fort Macleod recorded a population of 2,967 living in 1,226 of its 1,426 total private dwellings, a −4.8% change from its 2011 population of 3,117. With a land area of 23.41 square kilometres (9.04 sq mi), it had a population density of 126.7/km^{2} (328.3/sq mi) in 2016.

== Geography ==
The town is located in the Municipal District of Willow Creek No. 26, at the intersection of Highway 2 and Highway 3, on the Oldman River. It lies west of the larger community of Lethbridge, near the reserves of the Peigan and Kainai First Nations. It is also located close to the Waterton Lakes National Park.

The town is located 8 kilometres (5.0 mi) north of the McBride Lake Wind Farm, one of the largest wind farms in Alberta. The wind farm has a capacity of 75 megawatts of electricity.

== Climate ==
Fort Macleod experiences a humid continental climate (Köppen climate classification Dfb).

The community enjoys frequent breaks from cold spells in winter when the Chinook wind blows down-slope from the Rocky Mountains. A Chinook on 27 February 1992 caused the temperature to rise to 26.5 °C (80 °F).

The highest temperature ever recorded at Fort Macleod was 102 °F (38.9 °C) on 7 July 1896, 18 July 1910, and 17 July 1919. (Note: A temperature of 109 °F (42.8 °C) was recorded on 21 July 1877, but this value appears to be incorrect given the elevation of Fort Macleod and the irregularity of observations in that year.) The coldest temperature ever recorded was −49 °F (−45.0 °C) on 2 February 1905, 17 December 1924, and 28 January 1929.

Climate data for Fort Macleod, 1971–2000 normals, extremes 1876–present
Month	Jan	Feb	Mar	Apr	May	Jun	Jul	Aug	Sep	Oct	Nov	Dec	Year
Record high °C (°F)	19.8 (67.6)	26.5 (79.7)	27.8 (82.0)	32.2 (90.0)	34.5 (94.1)	38.3 (100.9)	38.9 (102.0)	37.2 (99.0)	36.7 (98.1)	31.0 (87.8)	26.1 (79.0)	25.0 (77.0)	38.9 (102.0)
Mean daily maximum °C (°F)	−1.3 (29.7)	1.9 (35.4)	6.7 (44.1)	12.7 (54.9)	18.0 (64.4)	22.4 (72.3)	25.6 (78.1)	24.8 (76.6)	19.1 (66.4)	14.3 (57.7)	4.2 (39.6)	−0.2 (31.6)	12.4 (54.3)
Daily mean °C (°F)	−7.1 (19.2)	−4.3 (24.3)	0.4 (32.7)	6.0 (42.8)	11.1 (52.0)	15.4 (59.7)	18.0 (64.4)	17.2 (63.0)	11.8 (53.2)	7.2 (45.0)	−1.2 (29.8)	−5.8 (21.6)	5.7 (42.3)
Mean daily minimum °C (°F)	−13 (9)	−10.4 (13.3)	−5.9 (21.4)	−0.8 (30.6)	4.1 (39.4)	8.3 (46.9)	10.4 (50.7)	9.5 (49.1)	4.4 (39.9)	0.0 (32.0)	−6.7 (19.9)	−11.5 (11.3)	−1 (30)
Record low °C (°F)	−45 (−49)	−45 (−49)	−36.7 (−34.1)	−23.3 (−9.9)	−15 (5)	−10 (14)	0.0 (32.0)	−2.2 (28.0)	−17.8 (0.0)	−28 (−18)	−38.9 (−38.0)	−45 (−49)	−45 (−49)
Average precipitation mm (inches)	21.0 (0.83)	17.8 (0.70)	27.5 (1.08)	37.7 (1.48)	57.2 (2.25)	61.2 (2.41)	46.5 (1.83)	50.0 (1.97)	46.2 (1.82)	18.9 (0.74)	20.2 (0.80)	20.9 (0.82)	425.0 (16.73)
Source: Environment Canada

== Sports ==
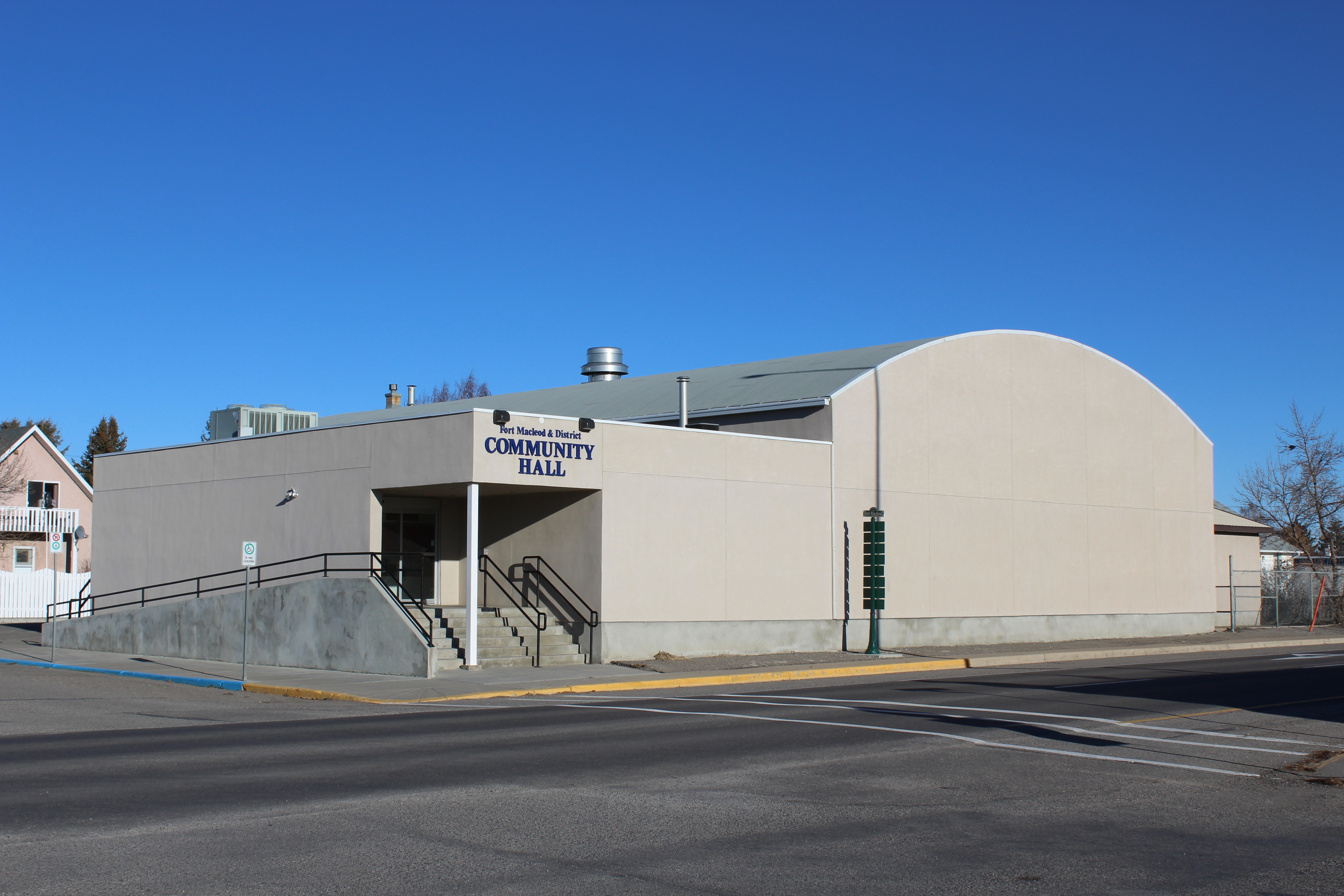
Fort Macleod & District Community Hall

The town is home to the Fort Macleod Mustangs, Senior AA men's hockey team of the Ranchland Hockey League.

== Media ==
Fort Macleod's local weekly newspaper is the Fort Macleod Gazette.

Historical newspapers

- Macleod Advertiser — published May 25, 1909, through September 11, 1913
- Macleod Chronicle — in print approximately July 1908 through June 1909
- Macleod Gazette — early issues were entitled The Macleod Gazette and Alberta Stock Record
- Macleod News — ran from November 2, 1916, through to June 1919
- Macleod Spectator — lasted from April 30, 1912, until October 26, 1916

== Notable people ==
- Henrietta Muir Edwards (1849–1931), women's rights activist
- Frederick Maurice Watson Harvey (1888–1980), Irish-Canadian soldier and rugby union athlete
- Sir Frederick Haultain (1857–1942), former premier of the North-West Territories
- Joni Mitchell (born 1943), singer-songwriter and multi-instrumentalist
- Ryland Moranz (born 1986), musician
- Constantine Scollen (1841–1902), missionary
- John Wort Hannam (born 1968), musician

== Film ==
The 2005 romantic drama film Brokeback Mountain was filmed in part in Fort Macleod. The laundry apartment is located at 2422 Third Avenue, where a sign is posted marking the "passionate reunion" of Jack and Ennis. Passchendaele was also filmed in Fort Macleod's historic downtown, which acted as a stand-in for Calgary circa 1915. Scenes involving the dust storm and Matthew McConaughey's character were also filmed in Fort Macleod in Christopher Nolan's 2014 film Interstellar, where the giant dust clouds were created on location using large fans to blow cellulose-based synthetic dust through the air. Francesco Lucente's motion picture drama Badland was filmed mostly in Fort Macleod. Francesco Lucente lived in Fort Macleod from 1974 to 1978. His father Salvatore Lucente owned the American and Queens Hotels during that time.

The downtown historic buildings were also used in the 2021 film Ghostbusters: Afterlife.

This site was also used as a filming location for 2023 TV Series The Last of Us.

== See also ==
- Alberta Police and Peace Officer Training Centre
- Fort Macleod Airport
- List of communities in Alberta
- List of towns in Alberta
- RCAF Station Fort Macleod
