= Alberta Police and Peace Officer Training Centre =

Proposal in Alberta, Canada (2005–2012)

The Alberta Police and Peace Officer Training Centre was a planned single-site training facility to be built in Fort Macleod, Alberta, by fall of 2010. It was to deliver basic training and professional development for police and peace officers including Sheriffs, special constables, correctional officers, transportation officers, fish and wildlife officers, conservation officers, private investigators and security guards in Alberta. 1,000 peace officers and 400 police officers were to be trained at the facility each year. The project had not yet moved forward when it was cancelled in 2012.

== Bidding process ==
In October 2005, 30 communities put in a bid to be the site of the proposed police college (Airdrie later withdrew its bid, leaving 29 communities in Alberta vying for the college). Ten communities were cut from the list in March 2005, leaving 19 communities. Four months later, in July, it was narrowed down to four communities; Camrose, Fort Macleod, Lac La Biche and Red Deer County, and a four-person selection committee was chosen by the Alberta Government. After visiting each community and considering each of their bids, the committee chose Fort Macleod as the site of the training centre, Gordon MacIvor as the lead in the application and bid.

== Training centre ==
The centre was to be built on 320 acres (1.3 km^{2}) of land in the southeast corner of Fort Macleod. It was expected to include classrooms, a library, a cafeteria, accommodations, indoor and outdoor firing ranges, a driving course and recreational areas. The town was to take care of all utilities on the land, while the college itself was to be built by a public-private partnership (P3), with an expected opening in 2010. The college was expected to provide an economic boom in Fort Macleod.

== Cancellation ==
In August 2012, the Alberta Solicitor General announced that the project had been cancelled by the provincial government. It was felt that the nine-figure cost was not justified, and that the centre would not substantially improve policing quality in the province. The decision was supported by the Chiefs of Police in Alberta's two largest cities, Calgary and Edmonton.

== See also ==
- Peace officer
- Police officer
