= List of Dino Ranch episodes =

The following is a list of episodes from the series Dino Ranch. It debuted on CBC in Canada on January 16, 2021, and on Disney Junior in the United States on January 18, 2021.

The series was renewed for a third season which premiered on September 11, 2023.

== Series overview ==
| Season | Segments | Episodes | Originally released | |
| Season | Segments | Episodes | First released | Last released |
|---|---|---|---|---|
| 1 | 52 | 26 | January 16, 2021 | April 15, 2022 |
| 2 | 52 | 26 | July 22, 2022 | July 8, 2023 |
| 3 | 26 | 13 | September 11, 2023 | April 29, 2024 |

== Episodes ==
=== Season 1 (2021–22) ===
| No. overall | No. in season | Title | Directed by | Written by | Storyboard by | Original release date |
|---|---|---|---|---|---|---|
| 1a | 1a | "Big Jon Big Trouble" | Bill Speers | J.D. Smith | Brad Cayford | January 16, 2021 |
Jon's enthusiasm gets the best of him when he tries to tame a rambunctious little Dinosaur all by himself. Inspired by his hero Bo, he learns that some jobs you just can't do on your own.
| 1b | 1b | "Min's Quest" | Bill Speers | J.D. Smith | Sara Mota | January 16, 2021 |
When Min overcomes adversity to find an elusive flower, she helps to cure an ailing Mother Brontosaurus and learns that perseverance always pays off.
| 2a | 2a | "Stop That Spinosaurus!" | Bill Speers | Craig Martin | Ian Westoby | January 18, 2021 |
When a rampaging dinosaur threatens to cause havoc, thanks to Miguel and his observant nature, Jon learns that sometimes it's better to slow down and think the problem through.
| 2b | 2b | "The Spookasaurus" | Bill Speers | Tom Berger | Chris Land | January 18, 2021 |
When Jon gets spooked by a campfire story about a legendary dinosaur, he doesn't want to admit it to Miguel and Min, then eventually comes clean and learns that his family is there for him whether he's scared or not.
| 3a | 3a | "Jane's Perfect Present" | Bill Speers | Scott McGuirk | Brad Cayford | January 19, 2021 |
After the Jr. Ranchers spend all their time trying to prepare a special surprise birthday gift for Jane, they find out that all she really wanted was to spend the day with them, and learn that spending your time with someone is the best gift of all.
| 3b | 3b | "Pterodactyl-Doodle-Doo" | Bill Speers | Caitlin Langelier | Sara Mota | January 19, 2021 |
When Miguel's creation of a new roost for Pteddy results in some unintended consequences, Miguel and the Jr. Ranchers learn that taking other people's feelings into consideration is the most important part of any good deed.
| 4a | 4a | "The Long Way Home" | Bill Speers | Diana Moore | Ian Westoby | January 25, 2021 |
Jon learns that shortcuts aren't always shorter when the Ranchers get lost in the badlands with the hungry Thunderfoot on their trail.
| 4b | 4b | "Trade in the Shade" | Bill Speers | Rodey Gozum | Perin McLean | January 25, 2021 |
When a Brontosaurus gets between the Jr. Ranchers and their goal to harvest the delicious apples from the orchard, the gang discovers the importance of placing somebody else's needs ahead of their own.
| 5a | 5a | "Small Wonder" | Bill Speers | Naomi Jardine | Brad Cayford | February 1, 2021 |
When a scrappy little compy gets underfoot trying to be just like Blitz, Blitz learns that even the smallest member of the team can make a big difference.
| 5b | 5b | "Dino Check-up Hiccup" | Bill Speers | Jiro C. Okada | Sara Mota | February 1, 2021 |
After Clover accidentally breaks Min's stegoscope and tries to hide the evidence, he learns that he should never be afraid to tell Min the truth when he makes a mistake.
| 6a | 6a | "Tinhorn Trouble" | Bill Speers | Craig Martin | Ian Westoby | February 8, 2021 |
When the Tinhorns trick the Dino Ranchers, Min proves that no matter the circumstances, you should always do the right thing and help.
| 6b | 6b | "Family Comes First" | Bill Speers | Kara Harun & Cheryl Meyer | Perin McLean | February 8, 2021 |
Pitted against the Tinhorns on Rancheroo Day, Jon learns that his family is more important to him than winning.
| 7a | 7a | "Clover's Tiny Problem" | Bill Speers | Tom Berger | Brad Cayford | February 15, 2021 |
When Min dotes on a newly hatched dino, Clover feels jealous, but then learns that no dinosaur can replace him in Min's heart.
| 7b | 7b | "Tango's BFF" | Bill Speers | Scott McGuirk | Sara Mota | February 15, 2021 |
After helping a fellow triceratops named Aroo, Tango becomes attached to her new friend and doesn't want her to rejoin her herd, but learns that it's selfish to keep her from her family.
| 8a | 8a | "Home on the Range" | Bill Speers | Caitlin Langelier | Ian Westoby | March 8, 2021 |
When a little Pachycephalosaurus named Wanda keeps running away from the Ranch, Min, Jon and Miguel discover that she's eager to join to a family that wants to welcome her as one of their own – and are reminded that you don't have to be born into a family to be welcomed into one.
| 8b | 8b | "Miguel's Compy Conundrum" | Bill Speers | Diana Moore | Perin McLean | March 8, 2021 |
After Miguel accidentally causes the ranch to be overrun with Compys, he learns that working hard to correct a mistake can sometimes yield a surprising result.
| 9a | 9a | "The Ten Gallon Trophy" | Bill Speers | Rodey Gozum | Brad Cayford | March 22, 2021 |
When Bopper runs off with Bo's prized Ten Gallon Trophy Hat, Tango believes that she has to be like Blitz and Clover in order to help the gang catch the elusive pachyosaur, then learns that she can help the team best by just being herself.
| 9a | 9b | "Plane Crazy" | Bill Speers | Naomi Jardine | Sara Mota | March 22, 2021 |
When Miguel underestimates his dino pals and gets carried away by his dream of flying, he learns that he needs to believe in his dino-friends as much as he believes in an idea.
| 10a | 10a | "Sneaky Swipers" | Bill Speers | Alan Gregg & Eric Steinhart | Ian Westoby | April 3, 2021 |
When things begin to disappear from Dino Ranch, Blitz and the gang discover the importance of knowing the facts before jumping to conclusions.
| 10b | 10b | "Clover's Height Fright" | Bill Speers | Craig Martin | Sara Mota | April 3, 2021 |
When Pteddy gets stuck atop the Mile High Mesa, Clover must overcome his fear of heights by taking things one step at a time to help his friend.
| 11a | 11a | "The Ballad of Big Jon" | Bill Speers | Caitlin Langelier | Brad Cayford | April 10, 2021 |
Prompted by a western hero, Jon wants to prove he's a real epic hero as well, but learns it's the smaller, more everyday good deeds that really make him a hero to his family.
| 11b | 11b | "One Good Turn" | Bill Speers | Tom Berger | Sara Mota | April 10, 2021 |
A pack of wild raptors go after Min and Jane as they're transporting a precious brontomelon in the medicine wagon, and in the ensuing chase they discover an act of kindness is often returned with kindness.
| 12a | 12a | "Guitar Heroes" | Bill Speers | Ben Joseph | Sara Mota | May 1, 2021 |
The Ranchers need Ogie Tinhorn's help to return a skittish dinosaur to its family, and Jon learns that even 'bad' guys have 'good' hearts.
| 12b | 12b | "Wild Wild Thunderfoot" | Bill Speers | Caitlin Langelier | Sara Mota | May 1, 2021 |
The Tinhorns trap Thunderfoot and the Dino Ranchers need to set him free.
| 13a | 13a | "Lost Dinosaur" | Bill Speers | Naomi Jardine | Sara Mota | May 8, 2021 |
Min spots a rare dinosaur in a hidden forest but later realizes it's very important to always respect nature.
| 13b | 13b | "The Dino Doldrums" | Bill Speers | Naomi Jardine | Sara Mota | May 8, 2021 |
When the Ranch dinos come down with an illness, Blitz learns it's important to admit when he's not feeling well
| 14a | 14a | "Goliath's Little Helper" | Bill Speers | Tom Berger | Sara Mota | June 28, 2021 |
Clover learns that even though he's not strong enough yet to be a barn builder like his grandpa Goliath, his job on the Ranch is just as important.
| 14b | 14b | "Have You Herd?" | Bill Speers | Tom Berger | Sara Mota | June 28, 2021 |
When a quirky little stego finds more joy acting like a compy, Jon & Blitz learn that family can come in all shapes & sizes.
| 15a | 15a | "Treasure Ranch" | Bill Speers | Caitlin Langelier | Sara Mota | July 12, 2021 |
Miguel and the Ranchers must protect the ranch from the Tinhorns from storming the mine and stop himself from getting caught up in the emerald excitement
| 15b | 15b | "Good Neighbors" | Bill Speers | Caitlin Langelier | Sara Mota | July 12, 2021 |
Jon learns that being 'neighborly' means helping everyone in need.
| 16a | 16a | "Blitz Be Gone" | Tom Berger | Caitlin Langelier | Sara Mota | July 26, 2021 |
After avoiding his Dino Dental check-up, Blitz learns that he had nothing to worry about and he's glad that he tried something new.
| 16b | 16b | "Little Big Shot" | Tom Berger | Caitlin Langelier | Sara Mota | July 26, 2021 |
Miguel invents a mechanical lasso but when it malfunctions he learns to keep trying and never give up.
| 17a | 17a | "Pterodackattack!" | Bill Speers | Naomi Jardine | Brad Cayford | July 17, 2021 |
When Miguel builds a dam on the creek to create a dino watering hole, the ranch is suddenly marauded by hungry wild pterodactyls snatching up food!
| 17b | 17b | "Sonny the Kid" | Bill Speers | Caitlin Langelier | Sara Mota | July 17, 2021 |
When the infamous dino rustler Sonny the Kid threatens to ruin her friends big day, Min volunteers to guard the Dino Airport, a task that proves to be easier said than done with all the exciting Opening Day events that keep drawing Min's attention.
| 18a | 18a | "Dino Sore" | Bill Speers | Craig Martin | Ian Westoby | September 24, 2021 |
Jon injures himself rescuing a wild raptor, and in order to reunite it with its family, he must be willing to play a different role and let Miguel and Min take the lead.
| 18b | 18b | "Strife in the Fast Lane" | Bill Speers | Tom Berger | Perin McLean | September 24, 2021 |
Min's excitement to deliver an egg to her friend leads the Dino Ranch gang into a runaway comedy of errors when their hastily repaired egg cart gets away on them.
| 19a | 19a | "Ranch-a-Pal-ooza" | Bill Speers | Ben Joseph | Brad Cayford | October 22, 2021 |
When Min puts her chores off to have fun with Tara, it causes a chain of events that leads to Angus squaring off with a wild spinosaurus.
| 19b | 19b | "Sky's the Limit" | Bill Speers | Caitlin Langelier | Sara Mota and Brad Cayford | October 22, 2021 |
Jon becomes upset when he doesn't take to ptero-flying as quickly as Miguel and Min, and pushes himself to be the best when he tries to fly a delivery through powerful winds.
| 20a | 20a | "Trading Day" | Bill Speers | Jennifer Daley | Ian Westoby | October 29, 2021 |
When the Jr. Ranchers switch up their dino-rides, they have a hard time getting used to each other's dinosaurs.
| 20b | 20b | "It's a Dino Egg-Mergency!" | Bill Speers | Naomi Jardine | Prem Gai S.G. | October 29, 2021 |
When a batch of eggs need to be moved from the Hatchery and start hatching, Min spirals into a frenzy trying to wrangle the rambunctious newborns and keep them safe.
| 21a | 21a | "Family Feud" | Bill Speers | Tom Berger | Brad Cayford | November 19, 2021 |
The Ranchers make trouble for themselves when they bicker and argue on their way to guide Aroo's migrating herd.
| 21b | 21b | "This Ranch Ain't Big Enough" | Bill Speers | Craig Martin | Jeff White | November 19, 2021 |
When a sick Spinosaurus needs to be tended to at the Ranch, Miguel lies to Biscuit to keep the two giants apart.
| 22a | 22a | "Herds of a Feather" | Bill Speers | Caitlin Langelier | Ian Westoby | December 17, 2021 |
After a mixed-up egg delivery by Miguel results in a baby T-Rex hatching at the Dino Airport, Miguel seeks to help the little dinosaur find his place among the airport team.
| 22b | 22b | "Stink to High Noon" | Bill Speers | Ben Joseph | Prem Gai S.G. & Terry Ververgaert | December 17, 2021 |
When Sonny the Kid hides stink weeds all over the Ranch, Jon goes against Min and Miguel's advice and is goaded into a lasso challenge by the outlaw- not realizing that if he loses, Sonny wants Blitz, Tango, and Clover as his prize!
| 23a | 23a | "Calling All Riders!" | Bill Speers | Tom Berger | Brad Cayford | January 14, 2022 |
The Cassidys and Tinhorns face off in a race, but it's only through learning to work together that they're able to finish the race.
| 23b | 23b | "Ridin' Mighty" | Bill Speers | Jennifer Daley | Jeff White | January 14, 2022 |
When the Dino Port calls on the Dino Ranchers to protect an important delivery, Zachary's praise makes Jon so proud that his confidence creates problems for the team.
| 24a | 24a | "Storm-a-Lert" | Bill Speers | Naomi Jardine | Ian Westoby | March 4, 2022 |
In the middle of an approaching storm, Miguel rushes through his important jobs so he can work on his new invention, but needs to make sure one task is finished before he moves on to another
| 24b | 24b | "Adoptasaurus Rex" | Bill Speers | Caitlin Langelier | Paul Bouchard | March 4, 2022 |
Ma and Pa inspire the Ranchers to fight through adversity and give an egg to a pair of male t-rexes who can't have their own.
| 25a | 25a | "The Great Dinosaur Getaway" | Bill Speers | Naomi Jardine | Terry Ververgaert | March 18, 2022 |
When Sonny the Kid rustles Blitz, Tango, and Clover, both the Ranchers and the dinos must have the confidence to work separately in order to be reunited.
| 25b | 25b | "Dino Ranch Rocks" | Bill Speers | Tom Berger | Jeff White | March 18, 2022 |
The Cassidy's party set-up is foiled by the jilted Tinhorns who think they weren't invited.
| 26a | 26a | "Tall in the Saddle Drive" | Michael Helmer | J.D. Smith | Ian Westoby | April 15, 2022 |
When a Brontosaur Leader gets separated from her herd, the Dino Ranchers need to keep the herd from scattering until she can reunite with them and lead the migration.
| 26b | 26b | "Min-Perfection" | Michael Helmer | Caitlin Langelier | Terry Ververgaert | April 15, 2022 |
Min's drive to impress her Ma gets the best of her when she tries to help Quack get over a scare without making a single mistake. Inspired by her hero Jane, she learns that everybody makes mistakes, and she shouldn't be afraid to ask for help when that happens.

=== Season 2 (2022–23) ===
| No. overall | No. in season | Title | Directed by | Written by | Storyboard by | Original release date |
|---|---|---|---|---|---|---|
| 27a | 1a | "Wranglin' Thunderfoot" | Michael Helmer | J.D. Smith | Joseph Bertrand | July 22, 2022 |
When Jon wrongly accuses Thunderfoot of scaring their dino herds, he creates trouble for Thunderfoot and for himself.
| 27b | 1b | "Wings Over Dino Ranch" | Michael Helmer | Ben Joseph & Mike D'Ascenzo | Andrew Dorland | July 22, 2022 |
When the Tinhorn Trio pick a field of glowing moon lilies, they accidentally prevent a flock of pterosaurs from finding their way home at night.
| 28a | 2a | "Bathtime for Bopper" | Michael Helmer | Caitlin Langelier | Jessa Naranjo & Andrew Dorland | July 29, 2022 |
Clover loves being clean and is eager to help Min bathe the dino mites, but stubborn baby Bopper wants to stay dirty.
| 28b | 2b | "Min Flies Solo" | Michael Helmer | Jeff Tran | Naomi Jardine | July 29, 2022 |
When Maggie the pterosaur hurts her wing, Min needs to copy Jon and Miguel's skills in order to help her.
| 29a | 3a | "Tango Dino-Sits" | Michael Helmer & Kyran Kelly | Joseph Bertrand | Caitlin Langelier | August 5, 2022 |
When Tango is asked to babysit the dino mites, she underestimates how big the job will be.
| 29b | 3b | "Fast Friends" | Michael Helmer & Kyran Kelly | J.D. Smith | Andrew Dorland | August 5, 2022 |
Blitz's patience is tested when he and Jon try to train a fast young raptor.
| 30a | 4a | "The Litterhorns" | Michael Helmer | Ben Joseph & Mike D'Ascenzo | Tom Nesbitt & Bradley Cayford | August 13, 2022 |
When Ike Tinhorn decides that it's easier to dispose of their garbage near Crystal Creek, it spoils the drinking water for dinosaurs downstream.
| 30b | 4b | "One Very Special Bronto" | Michael Helmer | Naomi Jardine | Jeff Tran | August 13, 2022 |
When Clover tries to be the Ranch's protector like Biscuit, he fails to notice that a T-Rex needs his help.
| 31a | 5a | "Dino Ranchers- Roll!" | Michael Helmer | Craig Martin | Joseph Bertrand | August 20, 2022 |
When a T-Rex needs to be rescued, Miguel is confident that his untested new Dino Rumbler is up to the task, but Jon and Min are worried that it isn't ready to take on a real dino rescue.
| 31b | 5b | "Risk it for Biscuit" | Michael Helmer & Kyran Kelly | Tom Berger | Andrew Dorland & Bradley Cayford | August 20, 2022 |
Out on a mission together, Jon is so keen to impress Biscuit that he causes problems by jumping too quickly into the lead rather than listening and working as a team.
| 32a | 6a | "Dino-SOAR!" | Michael Helmer | Caitlin Langelier | Glen Kennedy | August 26, 2022 |
When the Jr Ranchers attend the Dinoport's Flyer and Rescue training school, learning to fly new pterosaurs and operate their rescue vehicles, their skills are soon called upon to respond to a real rescue!
| 32b | 6b | "The Flyer and Rescue Squad" | Michael Helmer | Caitlin Langelier | Rajo Zakic & Bradley Cayford | August 26, 2022 |
When Stormwing's arrival causes trouble for the Dinoport, the fledgling Flyer and Rescue Squad take to the sky to complete their first important mission.
| 33a | 7a | "Winging It" | Kyran Kelly | Ben Joseph & Mike D'Ascenzo | Joseph Bertrand | September 3, 2022 |
The Jr Ranchers create a prosthetic for a baby pterosaur with a tiny wing, and help her learn how to fly.
| 33b | 7b | "Eggs on the Edge" | Michael Helmer | Naomi Jardine | Glen Kennedy | September 3, 2022 |
While trying to save pterosaur eggs during a windstorm, a damaged Dino Buggy complicates things for the Flyer and Rescue Squad.
| 34a | 8a | "The Mighty Dino Mites" | Kyran Kelly | Craig Martin | Joseph Bertrand | September 17, 2022 |
When Blitz's favorite stuffy goes missing, the dino mites team up to track down the culprit and save the day.
| 34b | 8b | "Home Sweet Home" | Kyran Kelly | Caitlin Langelier | Andrew Dorland & Bradley Cayford | September 17, 2022 |
When Clover tries to help a wild Rhinorex by bringing her home with him, the lovably messy dinosaur soon causes problems for her new Dino Ranch friends.
| 35a | 9a | "The Creepy Cryosaur" | Michael Helmer | Ben Joseph & Mike D'Ascenzo | Glen Kennedy | October 1, 2022 |
When Clara Tinhorn tries to scare the Jr Ranchers during their pumpkin patch harvest, she gets a taste of her own medicine.
| 35b | 9b | "Jon's Dino Detour" | Michael Helmer | Taylor Annisette | Leisl Adams | October 1, 2022 |
After making a mistake, Jon is so keen on doing a good job that he has trouble seeing that a dinosaur needs his help.
| 36a | 10a | "Miguel VS Thunderfoot" | Kyran Kelly | Maryan Haye | Joseph Bertrand | October 15, 2022 |
When Thunderfoot keeps knocking down a bridge made to help wild dinosaurs, Miguel realizes that the big spinosaur has a hidden reason for wanting the bridge out of the way.
| 36b | 10b | "Light Touch Tango" | Kyran Kelly | Richard Young | Chris Land | October 15, 2022 |
When Tango's usual smash-and-bash approach makes things worse for the day's chores, with help from Miguel's singing she learns how to gently save the day!
| 37a | 11a | "Perky Finds His Purpose" | Michael Helmer & Trevor Deane-Freeman | Naomi Jardine | Leisl Adams | October 29, 2022 |
When Perky stows away on a mission to find two missing Parasaurs, he complicates things when he tries to help the ranchers herd them home, but proves himself in the end.
| 37b | 11b | "Raptor Showdown" | Michael Helmer & Trevor Deane-Freeman | Caitlin Langelier | Glen Kennedy | October 29, 2022 |
Blitz and a pesky microraptor are pitted against one another in a cat and mouse battle of wills, but the tiny dino is a much bigger problem than expected.
| 38a | 12a | "Friendship Clashes" | Kyran Kelly | Ben Joseph & Mike D'Ascenzo | Joseph Bertrand | November 11, 2022 |
When Min and Clover see Clara and her Raptor not getting along, Min invites them to take part in friendship classes to strengthen their trust, communication, and cooperation skills.
| 38b | 12b | "Tango Takes Charge" | Kyran Kelly | Taylor Annisette | Chris Land | November 11, 2022 |
When plowing a new field doesn't go as he wanted, Angus learns that even a stubborn ol' Tritops like himself can learn something new.
| 39a | 13a | "A Dino-Might Night" | Michael Helmer & Trevor Deane-Freeman | J.D. Smith | Leisl Adams | December 3, 2022 |
When Sonny the Kid tries to steal the Cassidy Christmas Tree, he makes amends by helping them save the day - and is rewarded with a Christmas wish come true.
| 39b | 13b | "Luna Sees the Light" | Michael Helmer & Trevor Deane-Freeman | Naomi Jardine | Joseph Bertrand | December 3, 2022 |
When the Dino Ranchers use lights to communicate with a deaf Parasaur, the baby dino uses them to guide her herd to safety in a snowstorm.
| 40a | 14a | "Sonny Daze" | Kyran Kelly | Grant Sauvé | Glen Kennedy & Leisl Adams | December 17, 2022 |
Sonny the Kid gets under Jon's skin when he cheats during a dino tournament.
| 40b | 14b | "Rebel's Wonderful Way" | Kyran Kelly | Richard Young | Chris Land | December 17, 2022 |
When Blitz tries to teach Rebel how to be Dino Rancher, he mistakenly pushes his little student to do things his way and puts Rebel into trouble.
| 41a | 15a | "Rockslide Ravine" | Kyran Kelly | Taylor Annisette | Andrew Dorland & Bradley Cayford | January 7, 2023 |
The Rescue Flyers rally to do a seemingly impossible rescue with the help of their whole family.
| 41b | 15b | "Flying Colors" | Michael Helmer | Richard Young | Rajo Zakic, Joseph Bertrand & Bradley Cayford | January 7, 2023 |
When Jon's pursuit of his stolen Rescue Flyer Badge puts his family into trouble, Jon chooses to save something more important to him than an award.
| 42a | 16a | "Thunderin' Thundertot" | Michael Helmer & Trevor Deane-Freeman | Caitlin Langelier | Soohyun Kim | January 14, 2023 |
When Thundertot crashes Clover and Min's sleepover in the Hatchery, Clover's plans for the night are interrupted by the rambunctious baby spinosaur.
| 42b | 16b | "Clara's Shortcut Rut" | Michael Helmer & Trevor Deane-Freeman | Tom Berger | Leisl Adams | January 14, 2023 |
When Clara Tinhorn takes shortcuts on a Dino Ranch practice course, she lands her brothers in trouble and needs to put those skills to use.
| 43a | 17a | "Little Brother Blues" | Kyran Kelly | Taylor Annisette | Soohyun Kim | February 18, 2023 |
When Miguel and Ogie Tinhorn need to team up to help a baby bronto, the two youngest siblings show that they're the most heroic when they're just being themselves.
| 43b | 17b | "It Takes Two To Tango" | Kyran Kelly | Maryan Haye | Chris Land | February 18, 2023 |
When Aroo pays a surprise visit to Dino Ranch, Tango has so much fun playing with her triceratops friend that she forgets her promise to help Miguel with their chores.
| 44a | 18a | "Birthday Bash-less" | Michael Helmer & Trevor Deane-Freeman | Richard Young | Joseph Bertrand | March 11, 2023 |
When the Jr Ranchers welcome a wild baby triceratops into Tango's birthday celebrations, Tango gets frustrated when her big, loud events must be changed for the little dino.
| 44b | 18b | "Tickle Trouble" | Michael Helmer & Trevor Deane-Freeman | Naomi Jardine | Leisl Adams | March 11, 2023 |
When Clover brings tickly Tickle Bugs onto Dino Ranch, he tries to solve the problem himself AND makes the problem even worse.
| 45a | 19a | "A Pond Farewell" | Kyran Kelly | Caitlin Langelier | Chris Land | April 1, 2023 |
When Flopper the Plesiosaur grows too big for her pond, the Dino Ranchers need to find her a new home, but Jon is having a hard time with his friend moving away.
| 45b | 19b | "Tyrannosaurus Wrecks" | Kyran Kelly | Tom Berger | Evan Perusse | April 1, 2023 |
The Jr Ranchers face a challenge when trying to get a feisty pair of baby T-Rex's to listen and learn how to be Dino Ranch dinos.
| 46a | 20a | "The Dilo Difference" | Michael Helmer & Trevor Deane-Freeman | Taylor Annisette | Joseph Bertrand | April 15, 2023 |
Jon wants to help a Dilophosaurus fit in on the Ranch, but he runs into problems when the other dinosaurs are startled by the excitable little dino's appearance.
| 46b | 20b | "The Odd Partners" | Michael Helmer & Trevor Deane-Freeman | Richard Young | Leisl Adams | April 15, 2023 |
When headstrong Blitz and stubborn Clara Tinhorn get lost in the Hidden Forest, the two must work together to escape while avoiding an angry mama T-Rex looking for her baby.
| 47a | 21a | "Cautious Clover" | Kyran Kelly | Andrea Serralde | Pat Ventura | April 29, 2023 |
After Min nearly comes to harm during a rescue, Clover becomes overly protective.
| 47b | 21b | "Gentle Giselle" | Kyran Kelly | Naomi Jardine | Ian Freedman | April 29, 2023 |
Min and Clover mistakenly think a big, gentle Bronto is clumsy.
| 48a | 22a | "The Power of Two" | Michael Helmer & Trevor Deane-Freeman | Caitlin Langelier | Andy Kelly | May 13, 2023 |
When a trio of Rhinorexes blocks Miguel and Tango's way over a bridge, they'll have to work as a team in a way they've never tried before.
| 48b | 22b | "Min's Dino Mite Mistake" | Michael Helmer & Trevor Deane-Freeman | Tom Berger | Scott Jeralds | May 13, 2023 |
On their first visit to the Dino Port, the excited Dino Mites are harder to control than Min anticipated.
| 49a | 23a | "Supersauruses- Ride!" | Kyran Kelly | Taylor Annisette | Guy Vasilovich | May 27, 2023 |
Seeing how amazing Angus, Biscuit, and Quack are, the Jr Ranchers plan to put them together as a rescue team.
| 49b | 23b | "A Difficult Dino Doctor Day" | Kyran Kelly | Bita Joudaki | Mike Yank | May 27, 2023 |
When Thundertot feels sick, Min & Clover have to take care of her. However, that proves easier said than done.
| 50a | 24a | "Clover Takes Over" | Michael Helmer & Trevor Deane-Freeman | Richard Young | Keith Wagnar | June 10, 2023 |
When Clover's overconfidence jeopardizes a medical air mission, the bronto learns to ask for help.
| 50b | 24b | "You're More Than Your Roar" | Michael Helmer & Trevor Deane-Freeman | Naomi Jardine | Ian Freedman | June 10, 2023 |
When Biscuit gets a case of roaringitis and some egg-stealing Raptors invade the Ranch, Biscuit goes to ridiculous lengths to restore his roar.
| 51a | 25a | "Dino Patient Pileup" | Kyran Kelly | Caitlin Langelier | Pat Ventura | June 24, 2023 |
A large amount of dinos with boo-boos need help at the hatchery.
| 51b | 25b | "Sonny Wings it" | Kyran Kelly | Tom Berger | Scott Jeralds | June 24, 2023 |
Min needs to find a cactus to make a soothing ointment for some wild stegos.
| 52a | 26a | "Twister with a Chance of Thundertot" | Michael Helmer & Trevor Deane-Freeman | Taylor Annisette | Keith Wagnar | July 8, 2023 |
Twister must conquer his preconceptions of Spinosaurs to rescue the baby dino.
| 52b | 26b | "Flight of the Bumbling Ogie" | Michael Helmer & Trevor Deane-Freeman | Richard Young | Guy Vasilovich | July 8, 2023 |
When Miguel tries to teach Ogie how to fly a pterosaur, he keeps changing his lesson plan every time Ogie fails.

=== Season 3 (2023–24) ===
| No. overall | No. in season | Title | Directed by | Written by | Storyboard by | Original release date |
|---|---|---|---|---|---|---|
| 53a | 1a | "Hankie Comes Out of Her Shell" | Bill Speers | Caitlin Langelier | Ian Freedman | September 11, 2023 |
The hatching of a shy baby Ankylosaur sends Jon and Blitz into a scramble.
| 53b | 1b | "Min's Missing Care Case" | Bill Speers | Taylor Annisette | Keith Wagnar | September 11, 2023 |
Min's confidence takes a tumble when she loses her care case on a Dino Doctor mission.
| 54a | 2a | "A Dino Mite Graduation" | Bill Speers | Naomi Jardine | Guy Vasilovich | September 18, 2023 |
The baby Dino Mites aren't ready for Flapsy to move to the Pterosaur Barn.
| 54b | 2b | "Eye in the Sky" | Bill Speers | Matt Wayne | Pat Ventura | September 18, 2023 |
Pteddy's resistance to wearing vision-improving goggles jeopardizes the Dino Ranchers.
| 55a | 3a | "Clash of the Dinos" | Bill Speers | Caitlin Langelier | Ian Freedman | September 25, 2023 |
Jon and Miguel pair up to teach two baby dinos how to share food.
| 55b | 3b | "Steady As We Go" | John Lei | Bita Joudaki | Scott Jeralds | September 25, 2023 |
On a dinosaur drive through the mountains, Jon discovers that the dinos are comically slow.
| 56a | 4a | "No Nest for the Wicked" | Bill Speers | Taylor Annisette | Keith Wagnar | October 2, 2023 |
When Stormwing snatches Pteddy's nest, the Dino Ranchers mount a rescue mission.
| 56b | 4b | "Clara Winhorn!" | John Lei | Tom Berger | Ian Freedman | October 2, 2023 |
Clara Tinhorn lands herself in trouble when she tries to wrangle an angry dinosaur by herself.
| 57a | 5a | "The Sneakasaurus" | Bill Speers | Naomi Jardine | Pat Ventura | October 16, 2023 |
When someone's causing mischief on Dino Ranch, Blitz becomes determined to catch them.
| 57b | 5b | "Sonny's T-Rex Turmoil" | John Lei | Richard Young | Scott Jeralds | October 16, 2023 |
When Sonny the Kid dino-rustles mighty twin t-rexes Beans and Gravy, the Dino Ranchers must get the troublesome twins back before they destroy Sonny's hideout.
| 58a | 6a | "The Bronto Bully" | Bill Speers | Caitlin Langelier | Mike Yank | November 6, 2023 |
Clover has a run-in with a mean, wild dinosaur that takes his toys.
| 58b | 6b | "The Rustler and the Rumbler" | John Lei | Stephanie Kaliner | Guy Vasilovich | November 6, 2023 |
When the Jr. Ranchers return a rehabilitated T-rex to its home, Min doubts her doctoring skills.
| 59a | 7a | "The Yeti-Saurus" | Bill Speers | Tom Berger | Pat Ventura | November 20, 2023 |
The gang investigates a dino up on Blizzard Peak, and Miguel's wild imagination spooks him.
| 59b | 7b | "Wiggle-Tooth Tango" | John Lei | Rodey Gozum | Ian Freedman | November 20, 2023 |
When one of Tango's teeth starts to wiggle, she shies away from all the rough things.
| 60a | 8a | "A Laughing Matter" | Bill Speers | Naomi Jardine | Scott Jeralds | December 4, 2023 |
Jr. ranchers have a laugh.
| 60b | 8b | "Great Minds Think of Ike" | John Lei | Sheila Rogerson | Mike Yank | December 4, 2023 |
Praise goes to Ike's head.
| 61a | 9a | "Grand Ole Tree" | Kervin Faria | Erik Kuska | Ian Freedman | January 8, 2024 |
Tango can't bring herself to say goodbye to Old Shady, the oldest tree on Dino Ranch.
| 61b | 9b | "A Big Friend for Little Sadie" | Matt Wayne | Unknown | TBA | January 8, 2024 |
The Dino Ranchers try to match their friend Sadie with a dinosaur companion.
| 62a | 10a | "The Polka-Dot Parasaur" | Unknown | Unknown | TBA | January 22, 2024 |
A polka-dot parasaur is born on Dino Ranch.
| 62b | 10b | "Dusty the Digging Dino" | Unknown | Unknown | Guy Vasilovich | January 22, 2024 |
A new type of dino causes some upheaval.
| 63a | 11a | "Some Assembly Required" | Matt Wayne | Erik Kuska | Ian Freedman | February 26, 2024 |
Miguel shows Jon and Min the most important part of an inventor's process.
| 63b | 11b | "Angus's Pride and Joy" | Unknown | Unknown | Scott Jeralds | February 26, 2024 |
Angus' love for his new Dino transporter causes complications for the Jr. ranchers.
| 64a | 12a | "The Tricera-Trekkers" | Unknown | Unknown | Pat Ventura | April 15, 2024 |
When Miguel sticks too closely to the rule book, he gets the Tricera-Trekkers in trouble.
| 64b | 12b | "Flapsy Takes Off" | Unknown | Unknown | Mike Yank | April 15, 2024 |
When Miguel takes on teaching Flapsy to fly, he teaches her using other flying methods.
| 65a | 13a | "Grounded!" | Matt Wayne | Brandon Jeffords | Pat Ventura | April 29, 2024 |
| 65b | 13b | "Try, Fly Again" | Kervin Faria | Erik Kuska | Scott Jeralds | April 29, 2024 |
