= 17th Canadian Folk Music Awards =

2022 music awards ceremony

- Date: April 3, 2022
- Location: Charlottetown, Prince Edward Island
- Country: Canada
- Hosted by: Chelsey June, Benoît Bourque
- Website: folkawards.ca

The 17th Canadian Folk Music Awards were presented on April 3, 2022, to honour achievements in folk music by Canadian artists in 2021.

== Nominees and recipients ==
Traditional Album	Contemporary Album
Braden Gates, Kitchen Days; Fred Eaglesmith and Tif Ginn, Alive; Shane Cook and the Woodchippers, Be Here for a While; Grosse Isle, Le bonhomme Sept Heures / The Bonesetter; David Boulanger, Les sessions du Vices & Versa (15th Anniversary)	Allison Russell, Outside Child; Beyries, Encounter; Craig Cardiff, All This Time Running; Rick Fines, Solar Powered Too; David Leask, Voyageur in Song; Rob Lutes, Come Around; Ryland Moranz, XO, 1945; Reney Ray, À l'ouest du réel
Children's Album	Traditional Singer
Splash'N Boots, Heart Parade; Peter Puffin's Whale Tales, Campfire Time!; Garth Prince, Falling in Africa; Penny Pom Pom, Believe in Your Magic; Remy Rodden, Think About the Wild	Ewelina Ferenc, Songs from Home; Ray Schmidt, Sold Out; Pat Chessell, The Road Not Taken; Nicolas Boulerice Maison de pierre / Confiné au voyages; Sophie Lavoie, Le bonhomme Sept Heures / The Bonesetter
Contemporary Singer	Instrumental Solo Artist
Rob Lutes, Come Around; Kelly Bado, Hey Terre; Craig Cardiff, All This Time Running; Denise Flack, Good Water; Terra Spencer, Chasing Rabbits	Cédric Dind-Lavoie, Archives; Dave Clarke, The Healing Garden; Olivier Demers, À l'envers d'un monde; Maneli Jamal, Soul Odyssey; Adam Young, Yearbook
Instrumental Group	English Songwriter
Frank Evans and Ben Plotnick, Madison Archives; Amber and Zebulun, South of North, East of West; Shane Cook and the Woodchippers, Be Here for a While; Bùmarang, Echo Land; Oktopus, Créature	Allison Russell, Outside Child; Scott Cook, Tangle of Souls; Rick Fines, Solar Powered Too; Rob Lutes, Come Around; Noah Reid, Gemini; Ian Tamblyn, A Longing for Innocence
French Songwriter	Indigenous Songwriter
Reney Ray, À l'ouest du réel; Guillaume Beaulac, Guillaume Beaulac; Anne-Sophie Doré-Coulombe, Nos maisons; Émilie Landry, Arroser les fleurs; Flavie Léger-Roy, Les trous dans les coeurs	Chelsey June & Jaaji, Omen; David Laronde, I Know I Can Fly; Laura Niquay, Waska Matisiwin; Phyllis Sinclair, Ghost Bones; Morgan Toney, First Flight
Vocal Group	Ensemble
Twin Flames, Omen; Les Bouches Bées, Les trous dans les cœurs; The Fugitives, Trench Songs; The Gilberts, Tell Me; Whitehorse, Modern Love	Elliott Brood, Keeper; The Fugitives, Trench Songs; The Hello Darlins, Go by Feel; OKAN, Espiral; Whitehorse, Modern Love
Solo Artist	Global Roots Album
Alicia Toner, Joan; Rick Fines, Solar Powered Too; Maneli Jamal, Soul Odyssey; William Prince, Gospel First Nation; Dana Sipos, The Astral Plane; Laura Smith, As Long As I'm Dreaming	Elage Diouf, Wutiko; Eliana Cuevas ft. Aquiles Báez, El Currucha; OKAN, Espiral; Polky, Songs from Home; Gypsy Kumbia Orchestra, VelkomBak
Single of the Year	New/Emerging Artist
William Prince, "Gospel First Nation"; Andrea Bettger, "Yellow Snow"; Big Little Lions, "Never Mind the Weather"; The Deep Dark Woods, "Everything Reminds Me"; The East Pointers feat. Lonely Kid, "Elmira (Remix)"; The Hello Darlins ft. Matt Andersen, "Still Waters"; Rosier, "Pontoise"; Loryn Taggart, "The River"	Allison Russell, Outside Child; The Hello Darlins, Go By Feel; David Lafleche, Everyday Son; Oxlip, Your Mother Was a Peacock; Polky, Songs from Home; Noah Reid, Gemini
Producer	Pushing the Boundaries
Cédric Dind-Lavoie and Corne de brume, Archives; David Travers-Smith, Fernando Rosa and Annabelle Chvostek, String of Pearls; Luke Doucet and Melissa McClelland, Modern Love; Quinn Bachand, Légèrement; Rob Lutes and Rob MacDonald, Come Around	Cédric Dind-Lavoie, Archives; Briga, Territoire; Decoration Day, Makeshift Future; Rosier, Légèrement; Allison Russell, Outside Child; Speaker Face, Crescent
Young Performer
Isabella Samson, If It's Not Forever; The Broken Bridges, The Porch Sessions; Irish Millie, Thirteen; Paige Penney, When All Is Said and Done; Hannah Thomas, Christmas Don't Be Late
