= Sebastian Gaskin =

Sebastian Gaskin is a Cree singer-songwriter from Canada. He is most noted as winner of the Juno Award for Contemporary Indigenous Artist of the Year at the Juno Awards of 2025 for his 2024 single "Brown Man".

A member of the Tataskweyak Cree Nation in Manitoba, his style blends rhythm and blues, rock and pop elements.

Gaskin released his debut single "6 a.m." in 2017, and followed up with the EP Contradictions, in 2019. He was the opening act for a Winnipeg concert by rapper Common that year, with the Winnipeg Free Press praising him as "Post Malone mixed with Frank Ocean, all swag and smooth vocals, hits of hip-hop and rap, rounded out with emotive, thoughtful lyrics", and concluding that he was "on the cusp of becoming something truly exceptional".

He followed up with the single "Snakehold" in 2020, winning the award for R&B Artist of the Year at the 2021 Western Canadian Music Awards.

He signed to Ishkōdé Records in 2023, releasing the singles "Medicine", "Brown Man" and "Ghost" on the label in 2023 and 2024, before releasing the full-length album Lovechild in 2025. "Medicine" won the Vince Fontaine Indigenous Song Award at the 2024 SOCAN Awards, while "Ghost" peaked at #1 on the CBC Music Top 20 in June 2024. He also participated in The Rainbow Collective, a group of Canadian LGBTQ musicians organized by Theo Tams who recorded the charity single "This Little Light" in 2024.

In the same year, Tataskweyak erected a billboard celebrating him as a native of the community.

In addition to Gaskin's 2025 Juno nomination, Hill Kourkoutis received a nod for Recording Engineer of the Year for "Ghost".

He received a second Juno Award nomination for Contemporary Indigenous Artist of the Year at the Juno Awards of 2026, for the album Lovechild. In the same year he appeared as a guest vocalist on "I Know", a single from DJ Shub's album Heritage (Part Two).
