= Garth Prince =

Namibian-Canadian musician

Garth Prinsonsky, known as Garth Prince is a Namibian-Canadian musician and writer. He is most noted for his 2021 album Falling in Africa, which was a Canadian Folk Music Award nominee for Best Children's Album at the 17th Canadian Folk Music Awards in 2022, and won the Juno Award for Children's Album of the Year at the Juno Awards of 2022.

Born in Cape Town, South Africa, and raised in Swakopmund, Namibia, he was a member of the Mascato Youth Choir in childhood, and was later associated with the band Afroshine, best known for their 2008 single "Ti Mama". He moved to Edmonton, Alberta after marrying a Canadian woman he had met while touring Canada, and works primarily as a children's entertainer and educator on African music and culture.

He was the subject of Memoirs of the Motherland, a short documentary film, in 2019.

Falling in Africa was released concurrently with Grazing Back Home, a children's picture book created in collaboration with writer Tololwa M. Mollel and illustrator Jason Blower.

He was a Western Canadian Music Award nominee for Best Children's Entertainer in 2021.
