= Ryland Moranz =

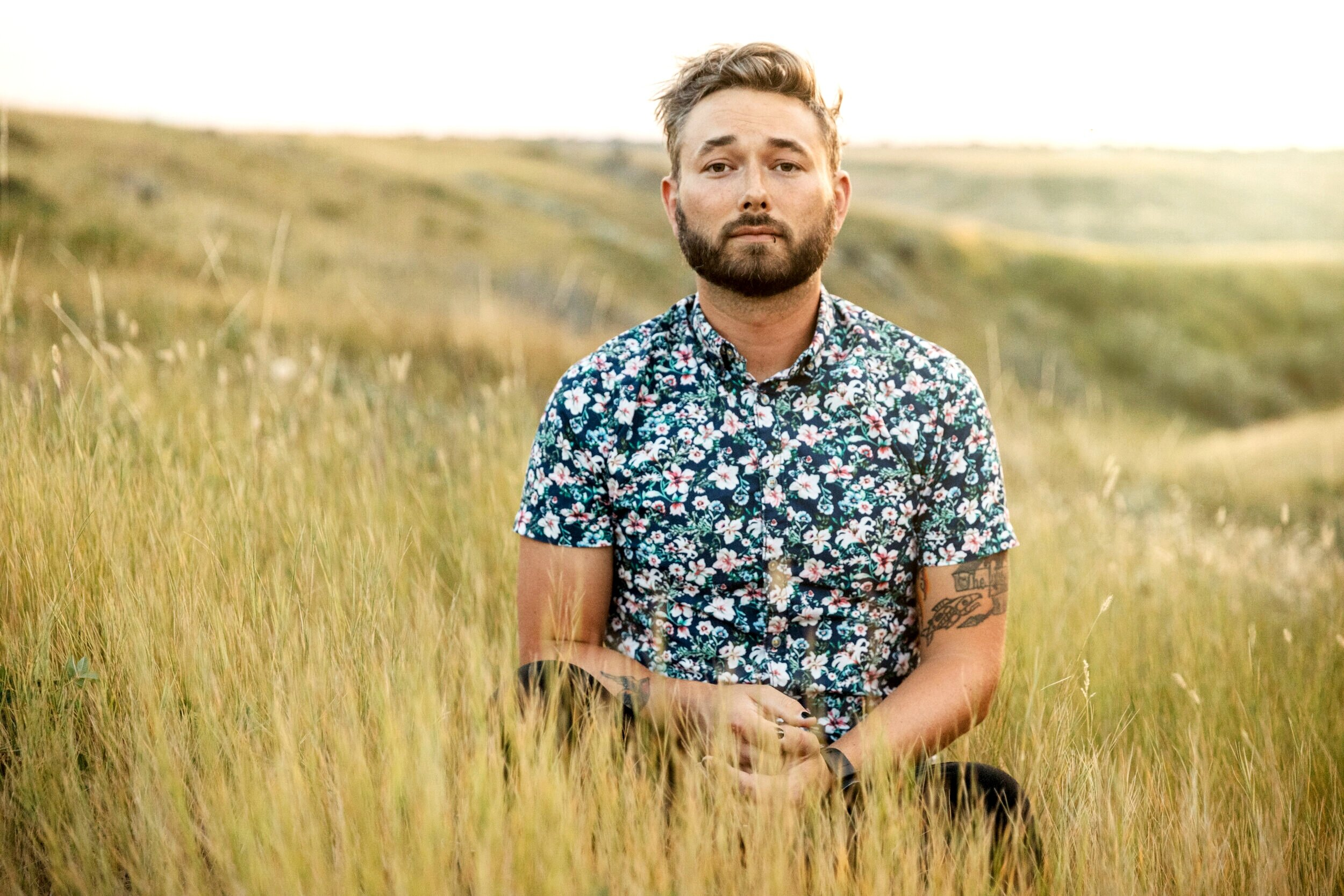

Background information
- Born: Ryland Riel Chambers-Moranz; January 22, 1986 (age 40); Lethbridge, Alberta, CAN
- Origin: Fort Macleod, Alberta, Canada
- Genres: Singer-songwriter, folk, bluegrass, canadiana, classical
- Occupations: Musician, songwriter, producer, audio engineer, audio researcher, poet, visual artist.
- Instruments: Voice, banjo, guitar, mandolin, mandola, piano.
- Works: Better/Worse (2024), XO, 1945. (2021), Hello New Old World (2016)
- Years active: 2015-present
- Labels: Tonic Records, Peace Run Records, Norwegian Blue
- Member of: Moranz & Fremlin, Leeroy Stagger
- Formerly of: the Rebeltone Sound, Sophomore Jakes
- Spinoffs: Barney Bentall, John Wort Hannam, The Blue Wranglers, JJ Shiplett, Wild Honey, CR Avery, The Lucky Ones
- Website: https://www.rylandmoranz.com

Ryland Moranz (born 1986) is a Canadian folk and country singer-songwriter based in Lethbridge, Alberta, whose 2020 album XO, 1945 was a Canadian Folk Music Award nominee for Contemporary Album of the Year at the 17th Canadian Folk Music Awards in 2022.

Originally from Fort Macleod, Moranz studied music at the University of Lethbridge. During his degree he was awarded the Sakamoto Research Prize and Chinook Research Award for his research on analog/digital mixing practices and perception. The findings of this research were published and presented as a conference paper at the AES (Audio Engineering Society) conference in New York, NY in 2019.

He released his debut album Hello New Old World in 2016 on Norwegian Blue Records. He has toured both as a solo artist to support the album, and as a session musician in Leeroy Stagger' and the Rebeltone Sound.

In 2024 Ryland released his third full-length album, Better/Worse which was recorded in Barnhouse Studios in Qualicum, BC. Musicians on the album included Scott Smith (Barney Bentall, Aaron Prichett) on guitar and pedal steel, Erik Nielsen (City & Colour, Deep Dark Woods) on bass and Leon Power (City and Colour, Frazey Foord) on drums. Better/Worse is the third of Ryland's albums to be produced by Leeroy Stagger.

In 2020 Ryland signed to Vancouver-based record label Tonic Records in anticipation of his album "XO, 1945". He has since released "Better/Worse" (2024) and released his first album "Hello New Old World" (2016) on Tonic.

Ryland signed to Australian booking agency Peace Run Records & Agency in 2023 which led to a six-week tour. A two-month followup tour of Australia and New Zealand followed in 2024.

Ryland is a Deering Banjos artist and plays a Deering Eagle II resonator banjo.
