= Amanda Rheaume =

Canadian musician

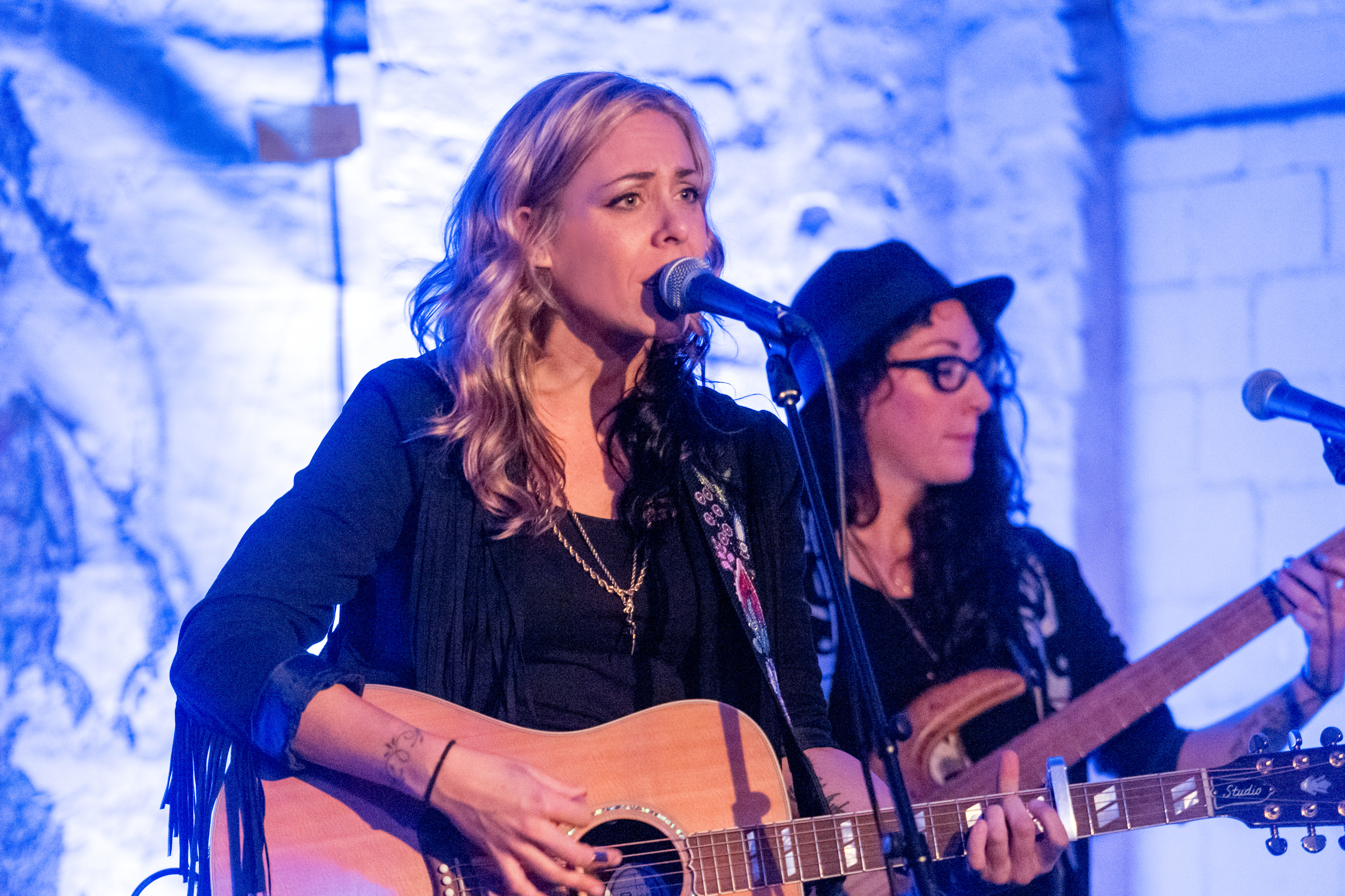
- Amanda Rheaume at Kranhaus Elmshorn, April 2016

Background information
- Birth name: Amanda Rheaume
- Born: May 25, 1982 (age 43); Ottawa, Ontario, Canada
- Origin: Ottawa, Ontario, Canada
- Genres: Americana, folk
- Occupation(s): Singer-songwriter, artist manager, label owner
- Instrument(s): Vocals, guitar, piano
- Years active: 2003–present
- Labels: Universal Music Canada; Ishkōdé Records
- Website: www.amandarheaume.com

Amanda Rheaume (born May 25, 1982) is a Métis folk singer-songwriter from Canada.

Born and raised in Ottawa, Ontario, Rheaume is a member of the Métis Nation of Ontario with Métis roots from Red River and has Objiwe/Anishinaabe ancestors from Lac Seul, Ontario. She is the granddaughter of Eugène Rhéaume, one of Canada's first Métis members of parliament.

== Career ==
Rheaume released a number of EPs, and contributed a song to the 2003 Ottawa compilation Ottawa Indie Vibe, before releasing her full-length debut album Light of Another Day in 2011. She supported the album with her first major national concert tour. She also travelled to Afghanistan on several occasions to perform for servicemen in the Canadian military during the War in Afghanistan,

After delving into her family history in more depth, she began writing songs inspired by her Métis heritage on her 2013 album Keep a Fire. The album won the Canadian Folk Music Award for Aboriginal Songwriter of the Year at the 10th Canadian Folk Music Awards in 2014, and was a Juno Award nominee for Aboriginal Album of the Year at the Juno Awards of 2014.

In 2016 she followed up with Holding Patterns, which was a CFMA nominee for Aboriginal Songwriter of the Year at the 12th Canadian Folk Music Awards in 2016.

In 2018, she performed the songs "Now for Plan A" and "The Stranger" at a Gord Downie tribute concert.

In 2019 she released her fourth album, The Skin I'm In.

In 2021, Rheaume and ShoShonna Kish of the band Digging Roots cofounded Ishkōdé Records, which releases music by Rheaume, Digging Roots, and singer-songwriters Aysanabee and Morgan Toney.

Her 2022 album The Spaces in Between was produced by Hill Kourkoutis. She received her third CFMA nomination for Indigenous Songwriter of the Year at the 18th Canadian Folk Music Awards in 2023.

Rheaume is director of operations for the International Indigenous Music Summit, and project coordinator for the creation of a National Indigenous Music Office.

== Discography ==
=== EPs ===
- Unravelling (2003)
- Even When (2005)
- If You Never Live (2007)
- Kiss Me Back (2009)

=== Albums ===
- Light of Another Day (2011)
- Keep a Fire (2013)
- Holding Patterns (2016)
- The Skin I'm In (2019)
- The Spaces in Between (2022)
- The Truth We Hold (2025)
