= Midnight Shine =

Canadian rock band

- Genres: Roots rock; pop rock
- Label: Midnight Shine Music
- Members: Adrian Sutherland; Stan Louttit; Zach Tomatuk; Charnelle Menow; George Gillies
- Website: midnightshineonline.com

Midnight Shine is a Canadian roots-rock band from Northern Ontario and Manitoba, consisting of lead vocalist/guitarist Adrian Sutherland (Attawapiskat First Nation), bassist/vocalist Stan Louttit (Moose Factory First Nation), guitarist/vocalist Zach Tomatuk (Moose Factory First Nation), and drummer Charnelle Menow (Norway House Cree Nation). They have released three studio albums and three music videos and have been actively touring across Canada since 2016.

== History ==
In 2011, Adrian Sutherland was given the opportunity to open for the band Trooper at their performance in Timmins, Ontario. He recruited three other musicians from the James Bay area to create Midnight Shine.

The band mixes roots, classic, and modern rock, with elements of their Indigenous language, Mushkegowuk Cree. In 2017, original drummer George Gillies departed the band. A year later, they recruited Charnelle Menow from Norway House, Manitoba as replacement.

In 2021, Sutherland released the solo album When the Magic Hits. The album was a Juno Award nominee for Contemporary Indigenous Artist of the Year at the Juno Awards of 2022.

In 2024, Sutherland collaborated with Brazilian actor and singer Rodrigo Massa on "Don Politico", a mixed English-Spanish version of his 2019 single "Politician Man".

In December 2025, he published his first book, The Work of Our Hands: A Cree Meditation on the Real World. The book was a shortlisted finalist for the Governor General's Award for English non-fiction at the 2026 Governor General's Awards.

== Members ==
- Adrian Sutherland – lead vocals, guitar (2011–present)
- Stan Louttit – bass, vocals (2011–present)
- Zach Tomatuk – guitar, vocals (2011–present)
- Charnelle Menow – drums (2018–present)
- George Gillies – drums (2011–2017)

== Discography ==
- Midnight Shine (2013; Midnight Shine Music)
- Northern Man (2014; Midnight Shine Music)
- High Road (2018; Midnight Shine Music)

== Music videos ==
- "I Need Angels" (November 8, 2018)
- "Heart of Gold" (January 8, 2019)
- "Bobcaygeon" (January 14, 2019)
- "Leather Skin" (May 27, 2019)
