= Digging Roots =

Canadian musical duo

- Origin: Toronto, Ontario, Canada
- Genres: Folk rock, First Nations music
- Years active: 2004–present
- Labels: Ishkōdé Records, Universal
- Members: Raven Kanatakta; ShoShona Kish
- Website: diggingrootsmusic.com

Digging Roots is a Canadian musical group consisting of husband and wife duo Raven Kanatakta and ShoShona Kish, whose musical style blends folk-rock, pop, blues, and hip hop. They won the Juno Award for Aboriginal Album of the Year in 2010 for their album We Are....

Kanatakta is originally from Winneway, Quebec, while Kish is from the Batchewana First Nation in Northern Ontario.

== History ==
Formed in 2004, the duo released their first album Seeds in 2006. The album was a nominee for the Aboriginal Album of the Year Juno at the Juno Awards of 2007. They followed with We Are... in 2009, which featured collaborations with Tanya Tagaq, DJ Bear Witness of A Tribe Called Red and Kinnie Starr, who also produced the album. Their third album For the Light was released in 2014.

They won the Canadian Aboriginal Music Award for Best Group in 2007.

In 2016, the band performed at the Salmon Arm Roots & Blues Festival and at the Ottawa Jazz Festival. In 2017, they performed at the National Arts Centre in Ottawa.

In 2018, Shoshona was awarded the Womex 18 Professional Excellence Award while Raven was awarded the Cobalt Award at the 2016 Maple Blues Awards.

After organizing three International Indigenous Music Summits together, Kish partnered with singer-songwriter Amanda Rheaume in 2021 to form Ishkōdé Records. The label releases music by Rheaume, Digging Roots, and singer-songwriters Aysanabee and Morgan Toney.

== Discography ==
=== Studio albums ===
- Seeds (2006)
- We Are (2009)
- For the Light (2014)
- Zhawenim (2022)

=== Singles ===
- Ak47 (2016)
- The Healer (2021)
- Cut My Hair (2021)
- SKODEN (2022)
