= Aysanabee =

Canadian Anisininew singer-songwriter

Aysanabee is an Anisininew singer-songwriter from Canada, whose debut album Watin was released in 2022.

Aysanabee Edmonton Nov 2026

== Background ==
A member of the Sandy Lake First Nation, he was born Evan Pang, with a non-inherited surname his mother chose in an attempt to protect him from anti-indigenous racism by portraying him to the community as Asian instead of indigenous, and raised in Kaministiquia, Ontario, outside of Thunder Bay. He reclaimed his grandfather's surname, Aysanabee, as an adult. He worked for a mining company as a teenager, later studying journalism and working as a digital content creator for CTV News.

He played in various bands as a sideline, and began actively creating his own original music as an outlet during the COVID-19 pandemic. He submitted his music to the International Indigenous Music Summit after making enough money on a cryptocurrency trade to cover the submission fee. He was the first outside artist signed to Ishkōdé Records, a new label launched in 2021 by singer-songwriter Amanda Rheaume and ShoShonna Kish of the band Digging Roots.

== Career ==
Watin was released November 4, 2022. Named for his grandfather's first name, the album features several recordings of his grandfather, recorded in phone conversations during the pandemic, as spoken interludes. The album was preceded by the single "Nomads", which reached #1 on the CBC Music Top 20 and charted on the Canadian rock radio airplay charts, reaching #1 on the Alternative Rock chart in March 2023 and becoming the first indigenous Canadian artist ever to top that chart.

CBC Music named Watin as one of the 22 best Canadian albums of 2022, and "Nomads" as one of the ten best Canadian songs of the year.

Aysanabee was a Juno Award nominee for Contemporary Indigenous Artist of the Year for Watin at the Juno Awards of 2023. He performed "We Were Here (It's in My Blood)" at the live gala on March 13, backed by the traditional indigenous round dance group Northern Cree; he also received praise for his performance outfit, a long jacket designed by Travis Shilling with feathers representing the Canadian Indian residential school gravesites.

Watin was shortlisted for the 2023 Polaris Music Prize.

He followed up in 2023 with the EP Here and Now.

== Discography ==
Year	Album
2022	Watin
2024	Here and Now
2025	Edge of the Earth

== Awards ==
Award	Year	Category	Nominee / work	Result	Ref
Juno Awards	2023	Contemporary Indigenous Artist of the Year	Watin	Nominated	
Juno Awards	2024	Contemporary Indigenous Artist of the Year	Here and Now	Nominated	
Juno Awards	2024	Alternative Album of the Year	Here and Now	Won	
Juno Awards	2024	Songwriter of the Year	"Alone", "Here and Now", "Somebody Else"	Won	
Juno Awards	2026	Alternative Album of the Year	Edge of the Earth	Won	
Juno Awards	2026	Contemporary Indigenous Artist of the Year	Edge of the Earth	Won	
Polaris Music Prize	2023	Album of the Year	Watin	Nominated	
Canadian Folk Music Awards	2026	Indigenous Songwriter of the Year	Edge of the Earth	Won	
Canadian Folk Music Awards	2026	Single of the Year	"Edge of the Earth"	Nominated	
