= Phyllis Sinclair =

Canadian singer-songwriter

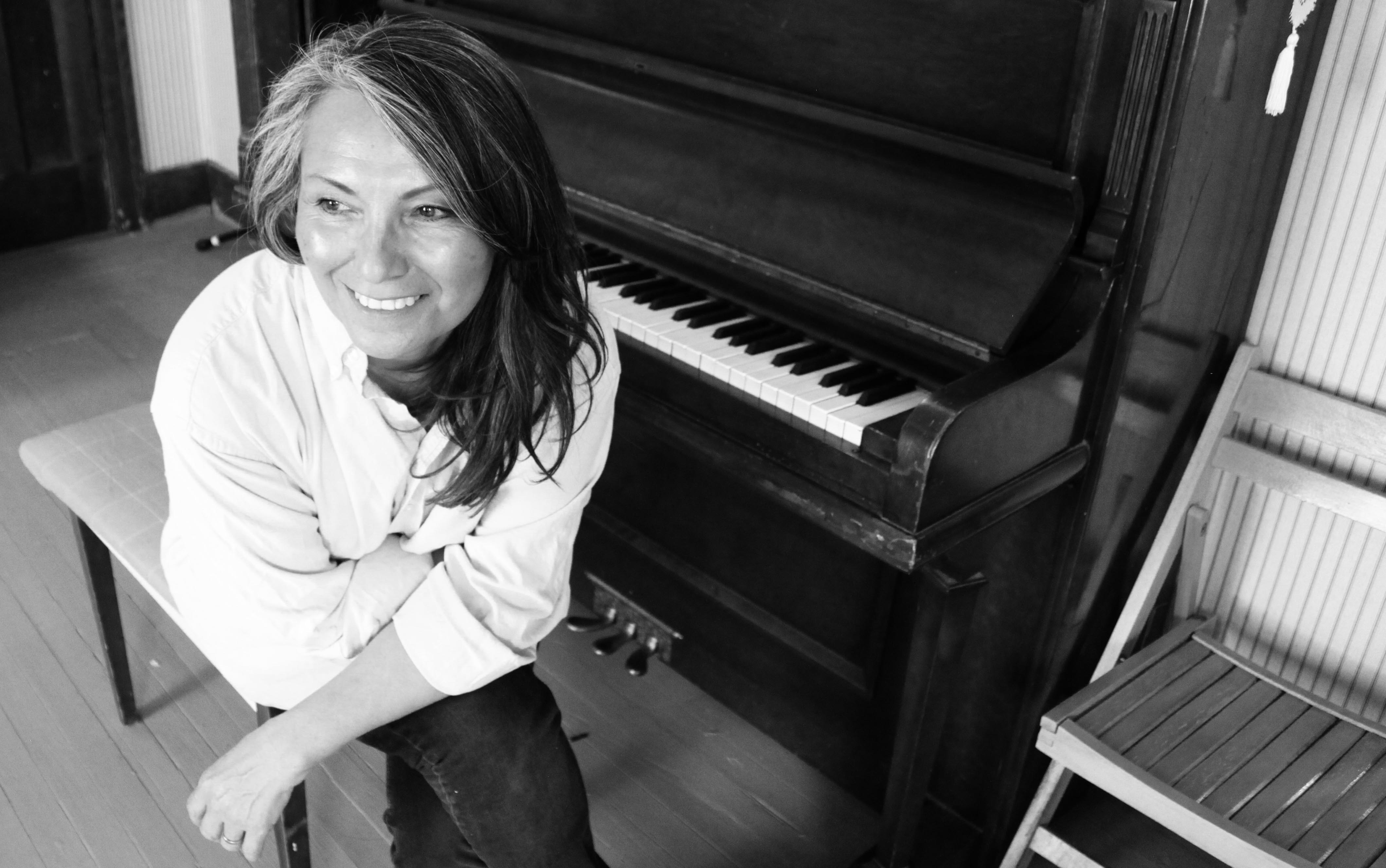

Phyllis Sinclair is a Cree, Canadian folk singer-songwriter. A socially conscious balladeer, UK's Maverick Magazine coined her "The Lady of Conviction". Sinclair's writing is rich in imagery, a continuation of the story-telling tradition of her Cree culture. Her songs are highly influenced by her experience being raised in Winnipeg's inner city in a working-class family.

== Early life ==
Phyllis Virginia Sinclair was born and raised in Churchill, Manitoba. The eldest of three children, she was raised by her Cree grandmother and mother. Her love for music was developed as a child through singing in the church and elementary school choirs, but none more than singing and jigging and at local gatherings where spoons and toe-tapping were often the only available instrument. Legends of Wisakedjak, and her grandmother's haunting high pitched vocalizations at bedtime fired her imagination and her love of story-telling. At the age of 10, her family moved to Winnipeg's inner city where she picked up the guitar and began her first foray into songwriting. As an escape from street life, she sang as soloist, and often with her younger sister and mother at churches, gatherings and local coffee houses. After spending much of her life working as a journalist across Canada, and in the northern British Columbia commercial fishing industry, Sinclair attained her Master of Business Administration degree while starting a solo career in folk music. She quickly made a name for himself after being featured in Canada's Penguin Eggs Magazine for her a cappella sea shanty, North Coast Fisher Wife's Prayer.

== Career ==
In 2006 she released Fence Posts and Stones, an album that planted Phyllis' music firmly on the Canadian folk music scene. From this album her song Hard Time Hannah went to No. 1 on the National Aboriginal Top 30 Countdown. Her second album, Fathomless Tales from Leviathan's Hole, earned her a 2008 Canadian Aboriginal Music Award nomination for Best Folk Acoustic album, and a selection by American music philanthropic music organization Musicians for a Cause to be included in their music awareness campaign to fight Alzheimer's Disease. Her song "The Manicure" was selected out of 350,000 entries world wide. In 2011, Phyllis earned a Canadian Aboriginal Music Award for Best Folk Acoustic Album for her album Dreams of the Washerwomen. This album was chosen by a CBC Radio Canada International as a Best New Recording by a Canadian Artist, and earned her a nomination for Female Artist of the Year by the Aboriginal Peoples Choice Music Awards. Phyllis Sinclair launched her first international tour in Australia in 2010. This tour was followed by her Dreams of the Washerwomen UK Tour in 2011. She has also toured across Canada and parts of the US.

== Discography ==
- Fence Posts and Stones (2006)
- Fathomless Tales from Leviathan's Hole (2008)
- Dreams of the Washerwomen (2011)
- Wishlist (2013)
- Ghost Bones (2021)
- Kiyam (2024)
