= 2011 Juno Cup =

Juno Cup of 2011
	1	2	3	Total
The Rockers	?	?	?	10
NHL Greats	?	?	?	13
- Date: 25 March 2011
- Arena: Ricoh Coliseum (Michael Landsberg host)

The Juno Cup of 2011 was an ice hockey game in Toronto, Ontario on 25 March 2011. It was the eight annual such competition, which is a charitable event held in conjunction with the 2011 Juno Awards.

The NHL Greats, former professional hockey players, won the game 13–10 over The Rockers.

A training camp for the players was held at the Ricoh Coliseum, the game venue, on 8 February 2011.

== Roster ==
Competing teams consist of the NHL Greats (NHL players) and The Rockers (musicians).

=== NHL Greats ===
As of 16 March 2011

- Valeri Bure
- Paul Coffey
- Russ Courtnall
- Troy Crowder
- Brad Dalgarno
- Curtis Joseph
- Derek King
- Gary Leeman
- Mark Napier
- Mike Pelyk
- Gary Roberts

=== Rockers ===
As of 16 March 2011

- Tyler Armes
- Paul Aucoin
- Mike Belitsky
- Barney Bentall
- Dustin Bentall
- Jay Bodner
- DJ Mike Boyd
- George Canyon
- Classified
- Bryan Crouch
- Jim Cuddy
- Sean Dean
- Kathleen Edwards
- Vince Fontaine
- Jon Gallant
- Sarah Harmer
- Rob Higgins (Dearly Beloved)
- Brad Keller (Creaking Tree String Quartet)
- Peter Kesper
- Brian Kobayakawa (Creaking Tree String Quartet)
- Ron MacLean (Hockey Night in Canada)
- Johnny Max (Johnny Max Band)
- Chris Murphy
- Greg Millson
- Kevin Parent
- Andrew Scott
- Menno Versteeg
