= 2009 Juno Cup =

Juno Cup of 2009
	1	2	3	SO	Total
The Rockers	?	?	?	?	12 (SO)
NHL Greats	?	?	?	?	11
- Date: 27 March 2009
- Arena: UBC Thunderbird Arena (Michael Landsberg host)
- City: Vancouver, British Columbia

The 6th Annual Juno Cup game took place at the UBC Thunderbird Arena, Vancouver, British Columbia, Canada on Friday 27 March 2009. That year NHL Greats such as Russ Courtnall, Brad Dalgarno, Mark Napier, Mike Pelyk, Bob Probert and Vancouver Canuck Cliff Ronning laced up against the Rockers. The Rockers gathered an enormous roster with artists such as Barenaked Ladies, Blue Rodeo, Great Big Sea, Kathleen Edwards and Sarah McLachlan.

== Roster ==
NHLers:

- Bob Probert
- Brad Dalgarno
- Cliff Ronning
- Dave Babych
- Garth Butcher
- Gino Odjick
- Greg Adams
- Lanny McDonald
- Mark Napier
- Mike Pelyk
- Russ Courtnall
- Troy Crowder

Rockers:

- Aaron Pritchett
- Alan Doyle (Great Big Sea)
- Barney Bentall
- Brad Keller (Creaking Tree String Quartet)
- Brian Kobayakawa (Creaking Tree String Quartet)
- Cameron Melnyk (State of Shock)
- Captain Scotty (Jeff O'Neil show on 99.3 The Fox)
- Craig Northey (Odds)
- Dustin Bentall
- George Canyon
- Jay Bodner (Eagle & Hawk)
- Jesse Wainwright (State of Shock)
- John Berry
- Jim Cuddy(Blue Rodeo)
- John Dinsmore (NQ Arbuckle & Kathleen Edwards)
- Kathleen Edwards *
- Kevin Parent
- Luke Doucet
- Mark Sasso (Elliott Brood)
- Matthew Barber
- Matt Johnson (54-40)
- Michael Hollett
- Paul Hawley (Hot Hot Heat)
- Peter Kesper (NQ Arbuckle)
- Rob Higgins (Dearly Beloved)
- Sarah McLachlan (2009 Allan Waters Humanitarian Award)
- Sean McCann (Great Big Sea)
- Steve Dawson
- Tyler Stewart (Barenaked Ladies)
- Tyson Yerex (Acres of Lions)
- Vince Fontaine (Eagle & Hawk)
