= Morning Coffee =

Morning Coffee may refer to:

- Morning Coffee (Firefox add-on)
- "Morning Coffee" (song), a 1998 single by J-pop idol group Morning Musume
- "Morning Coffee", a song by Herb Alpert from the 2009 album Anything Goes
- "Morning Coffee", a song by Don Amero from the 2020 extended play The Next Chapter
