= 2010 Juno Cup =

Ice hockey competition

Juno Cup of 2010
	1	2	3	Total
The Rockers	?	?	?	8
NHL Greats	?	?	?	9
- Date: 16 April 2010
- Arena: Jack Byrne Arena (Michael Landsberg host)
- City: Torbay, Newfoundland and Labrador

The Juno Cup of 2010 was an ice hockey game which took place in Torbay, Newfoundland and Labrador on 16 April 2010. This was the seventh annual such competition which is a charitable event held in conjunction with the 2010 Juno Awards in nearby St. John's. Michael Landsberg of TSN was the play-by-play announcer.

The NHL Greats won the game 9–8. Proceeds support the musical education initiative MusiCounts.

== Roster ==
Competing teams consist of the NHL Greats (NHL players) and The Rockers (musicians).

=== NHL Greats ===
- Troy Crowder
- Brad Dalgarno
- Harold Druken
- Andrew McKim
- Mark Napier
- Gary Roberts
- Greg Smyth
- Andy Sullivan

=== Rockers ===
- Paul Aucoin (The Hylozoists)
- Rich Aucoin
- Barney Bentall
- Patrick Birtles (Ten Second Epic)
- Jay Bodner (Eagle & Hawk)
- George Canyon
- Classified
- Evan Cranley (Stars/Broken Social Scene)
- Jim Cuddy (Blue Rodeo) – captain
- Randy Curnew
- Tim D'eon (Wintersleep)
- John Dinsmore (NQ Arbuckle)
- Alan Doyle – coach
- Vince Fontaine (Eagle & Hawk)
- Jonathan Gallant (Billy Talent)
- Rex Goudie
- Allan Hawco (Republic of Doyle)
- Rob Higgins (Dearly Beloved)
- Raven Kanatakta (Digging Roots)
- Pete Kesper (NQ Arbuckle)
- François Lamoureux
- Domenic Mancuso
- Sean McCann (Great Big Sea)
- Greg Millson (Great Lake Swimmers)
- Paul Murphy (Wintersleep)
- Andrew Usenik (Ten Second Epic)
