= Juno Cup =

Canadian yearly ice hockey game

The Juno Cup is a yearly ice hockey game held in conjunction with the Juno Awards, first conducted at the 2004 Juno Awards. The games match National Hockey League alumni with artists and entertainers as a charitable benefit for MusiCounts, a music education charity operated by the CARAS. The Juno Cup has helped raise more than $700,000 for MusiCounts (formerly known as the CARAS Music Education Program) which in turn supported music programs across Canada.

Each game features a team of current or former NHL players (NHL Greats) who competes against a team composed of musicians (The Rockers). The NHL Greats have won each Juno Cup except in 2009, 2019, and 2023. The event was not held in 2020, 2021, 2022, 2024, 2025, and 2026.

== Dates and locations ==
Juno Cup Dates and Locations
Year	Date	City	Venue	Winning team	Score
2004	2 April	Edmonton, Alberta	AgriCom Arena	NHL Greats	12-8
2005	1 April	Selkirk, Manitoba	Selkirk Rec Complex	NHL Greats	6-5
2006	31 March	Halifax, Nova Scotia	Halifax Forum	NHL Greats	12-11
2007	30 March	Prince Albert, Saskatchewan	Art Hauser Centre	NHL Greats	11-9
2008	4 April	Calgary, Alberta	Stampede Corral	NHL Greats	16-5
2009	27 March	Vancouver, British Columbia	UBC Thunderbird Arena	The Rockers	12-11 (SO)
2010	16 April	Torbay, Newfoundland and Labrador	Jack Byrne Arena	NHL Greats	9-8
2011	25 March	Toronto, Ontario	Ricoh Coliseum	NHL Greats	13-10
2012	30 March	Ottawa, Ontario	Nepean Sportsplex	NHL Greats	12-10
2013	19 April	Moose Jaw, Saskatchewan	Mosaic Place	NHL Greats	9-8
2014	28 March	Winnipeg, Manitoba	MTS Iceplex	NHL Greats	10-9
2015	13 March	Hamilton, Ontario	Dave Andreychuk Mountain Arena & Skating Centre	NHL Greats	9-7
2016	1 April	Calgary, Alberta	Max Bell Centre	NHL Greats	12-10
2017	31 March	Ottawa, Ontario	TD Place Arena	NHL Greats	13-12
2018	23 March	Vancouver, British Columbia	Bill Copeland Sports Centre	NHL Greats	OT win
2019	15 March	London, Ontario	Western Fair District Sports Centre	The Rockers	7-5
2023	15 March	Edmonton, Alberta	Downtown Community Arena	The Rockers	4-3
