= Booker T (wrestler) =

American professional wrestler (born 1965)

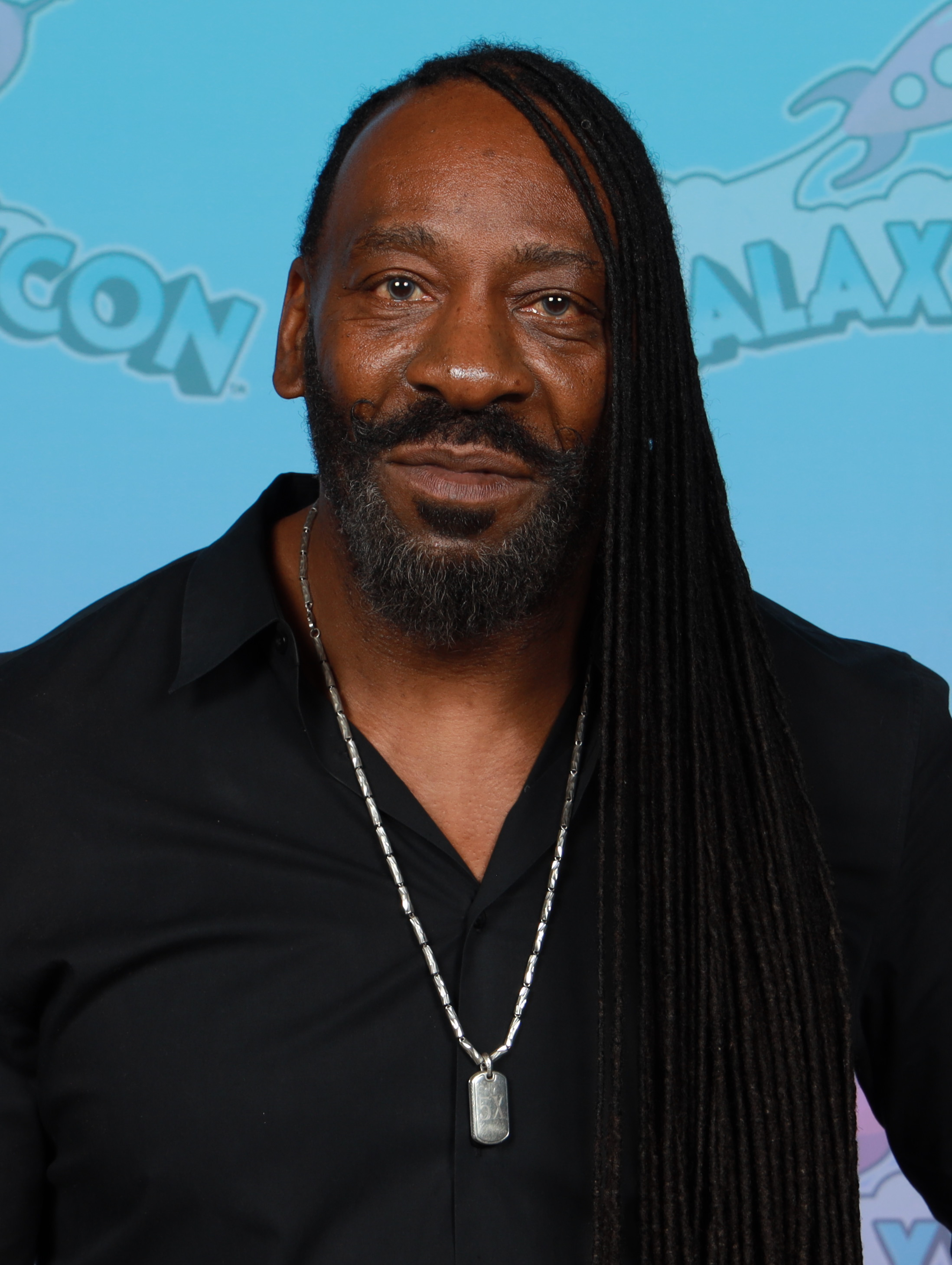
- Booker T in 2025

Personal information
- Born: Booker T. Huffman Jr. March 1, 1965 (age 61) Plain Dealing, Louisiana, U.S.
- Spouses: Levestia Huffman (m. 1996; div. 2001) Sharmell Sullivan (m. 2005)
- Children: 3
- Relative: Stevie Ray (brother)

Professional wrestling career
- Ring name(s): Black Snow; Booker; Booker T GI Bro; King Booker; Kole
- Billed height: 6 ft 3 in (191 cm)
- Billed weight: 256 lb (116 kg)
- Billed from: 110th Street in Harlem, New York; Houston, Texas
- Trained by: Ivan Putski; Scott Casey
- Debut: 1990
- Retired: 2025

Booker T. Huffman Jr. (born March 1, 1965), better known by his ring name Booker T, is an American professional wrestling trainer, color commentator, and retired professional wrestler. He is signed to WWE, where he serves as a color commentator on the NXT brand, as well as premium live events for WWE Radio. He is also the owner and founder of the independent promotion Reality of Wrestling (ROW).

Booker is known for his tenure in World Championship Wrestling (WCW), the World Wrestling Federation/Entertainment (WWF/E), and Total Nonstop Action Wrestling (TNA), holding 35 championships between those organizations. He is the most decorated wrestler in WCW history, having held 21 titles, including a record six WCW World Television Championships (along with being the first African American titleholder), and a record 11 WCW World Tag Team Championships: 10 as one half of Harlem Heat with his brother, Lash "Stevie Ray" Huffman in WCW (most reigns within that company), and one in the WWF with Test. Booker was the final WCW World Heavyweight Champion and WCW United States Heavyweight Champion under the WCW banner.

Booker is an overall six-time world champion in professional wrestling, having won the WCW World Heavyweight Championship five times and WWE's World Heavyweight Championship once. With his fifth WCW Championship win (which occurred in the WWF), Booker T became the second African-American to win a world championship in WWF/E and also the first to be of non-mixed race. He is also the winner of the 2006 King of the Ring tournament, the 16th Triple Crown Champion, and the eighth Grand Slam Champion in WWE history. As the ninth WCW Triple Crown Champion, Booker is one of four men to achieve both the WWE and WCW Triple Crowns, as well as the only to be a Grand Slam Champion for both WWE and WCW. He has headlined multiple pay-per-view events for the WWF/E, WCW and TNA throughout his career.

Booker was inducted into the WWE Hall of Fame on April 6, 2013, by his brother, Lash. Both he and Lash were inducted together into the 2019 class on April 6, 2019, as Harlem Heat, making Booker a two-time Hall of Famer.

Alongside his NXT commentary, Booker also provides alternative commentary on SiriusXM’s WWE Radio channel for pay-per-view events.

== Early life ==
Booker T. Huffman Jr. (Note: Huffman has confirmed in interviews that the "T." in his name does not mean anything, and that the "T." itself is the name. See: "Booker T Plays WikiFact or WikiFiction". Reality of Wrestling. July 10, 2021. Archived from the original on December 21, 2021. "My name is Booker T. Huffman Jr., and the 'T' stands for nothing; it's just 'T', period ... that's been my name since birth."; Oliver, Greg (September 26, 2012). "The book on Booker T ends too early". Slam Wrestling. "His father died shortly after he was born, so Booker T. Huffman Jr. — 'Junior' to his family — is raised by his mother ... ."; "WWE Hall of Famer Booker T Announces Mayoral Run". TheWrap. December 13, 2016. "Booker T's full name is Booker T. Huffman Jr."; "WWE CEO Vince McMahon once used N-word in awkward comedy routine with wrestler Booker T". New York Daily News. July 24, 2015. Archived from the original on July 27, 2015. "... wrestler Booker T. Huffman Jr. ... .") was born on March 1, 1965, in Plain Dealing, Louisiana, though his birthplace is often misidentified as Houston, Texas. He is the youngest of eight children. His father, Booker T. Huffman Sr. died at 60 years old when he was less than a year old. His mother died when he was only 13. He then lived with his 16-year-old sister, then later moved in with his older brother Lash at age 17. In high school, he was a drum major at Jack Yates High School in Houston Texas.

== Professional wrestling career ==
=== Early career (1990–1992) ===
As a single father working at a storage company in Houston, Texas, Huffman was looking to make a better life for himself and his son. His brother Lash suggested that the two check out a new professional wrestling school being opened by Ivan Putski in conjunction with his Western Wrestling Alliance (WWA). His boss at the storage company put up the money to pay for his wrestling lessons. Booker trained under Scott Casey, who helped to turn Booker's background as a gangster and dancer into a wrestling character, teaching him in-ring psychology and ring generalship.

Eight weeks later, Booker debuted as G.I. Bro on Putski's Western Wrestling Alliance Live! program. The character was a tie-in to the raging Gulf War and the WWF's Sgt. Slaughter angle. Even though the WWA met its demise some time later, Booker continued to wrestle on the Texas independent circuit, often with his brother Lash.

=== Global Wrestling Federation (1992–1993) ===
Booker and his brother were spotted by Skandor Akbar, who hired them to work for the Global Wrestling Federation (GWF), where he and Eddie Gilbert were involved. Gilbert teamed Stevie Ray and Booker T together as the Ebony Experience, and they won the GWF Tag Team Championship on July 31, 1992. During their time with GWF, they held the tag title a total of three times. Subsequently, Booker T and Stevie Ray left the GWF to work for World Championship Wrestling (WCW). During that time, they also worked for Network Of Wrestling in Japan.

=== World Championship Wrestling (1993–2001) ===
==== Harlem Heat (1993–1997) ====
Booker T and his brother Stevie Ray signed with World Championship Wrestling (WCW) after Sid Vicious recommended they sign with the company. In August 1993, they debuted as the tag team Harlem Heat, with Booker T renamed Kole and Lash renamed Kane. They debuted as heels and were on Harley Race and Col. Rob Parker's team in the WarGames match at Fall Brawl 1993 on September 19 against Sting, Davey Boy Smith, Dustin Rhodes, and the Shockmaster. They lost the match but were over as heels because of the caliber of faces they wrestled.

In 1994, they acquired the services of Sister Sherri as their manager and changed their names back to Booker T and Stevie Ray, at their request. By the end of 1994, they held the WCW World Tag Team Championship after defeating Stars and Stripes (The Patriot and Marcus Alexander Bagwell) in December. After dropping the title to the Nasty Boys, Harlem Heat regained the belts on June 24, 1995.

Afterward, Harlem Heat got into a feud with Col. Parker's "Stud Stable" of "Dirty" Dick Slater and Bunkhouse Buck. Parker and Sherri were carrying on a love affair and Parker eventually left the Stud Stable in favor of the Heat to be with Sherri. Harlem Heat won the WCW World Tag Team Championship at Fall Brawl 1995, defeating Dick Slater and Bunkhouse Buck. Their third title reign only lasted one day, but the duo regained the tag team title nine days later from the American Males (Buff Bagwell and Scotty Riggs). On the June 24, 1996, Nitro, Harlem Heat defeated Lex Luger and Sting to capture their fifth WCW World Tag Team Championship.

Three days after losing the tag team titles to the Steiner Brothers, Harlem Heat regained the titles back from the Steiners on July 27. On September 23, Booker T and Stevie Ray were defeated by Public Enemy (Rocco Rock and Johnny Grunge) but took the titles back for the seventh time on October 1.

They lost the Tag Team Championship to the Outsiders (Kevin Nash and Scott Hall) on October 27. Subsequently, they fired Col. Parker and beat him up and became full-fledged faces. They then entered into a brief feud against Col. Parker's newest team, the Amazing French Canadians, a feud they won. In 1997, they feuded with Public Enemy (Grunge & Rocco), the Steiners, and the nWo. In fall 1997, they fired Sherri and added a new manager, Jacqueline. They were briefly put out of action by the nWo and returned to feud with the Faces of Fear (Meng and the Barbarian). Stevie then took five months off from WCW to recover from an ankle injury and Jacqueline left for the WWF.

==== World Television Champion (1997–1999) ====
Booker T made the transition into singles action and won the WCW World Television Championship from Disco Inferno on the December 29, 1997, episode of Nitro. Booker T feuded over the title with Perry Saturn and Rick Martel culminating in a gauntlet match at SuperBrawl VIII. Martel, the man that was originally supposed to win the match, went down early due to a knee injury, meaning the finish and the remainder of the match had to be called in the ring.

During spring 1998, Booker T began feuding with Chris Benoit. Benoit cost Booker T the World Television Championship during a match against Fit Finlay. As a result, Booker T and Benoit engaged in a "best-of-seven series" with the winner meeting Finlay for the title. After seven matches and interference from Bret Hart and Stevie Ray, Booker T won the series, and on June 14, regained the Television Championship.

Booker T scored a clean pinfall victory over Bret Hart on the edition of February 22 of Nitro. The following month, he regained the World Television Championship from Scott Steiner, who, in turn, defeated Booker T in the finals of the WCW United States Heavyweight Championship tournament. Booker T lost the World Television Championship to Rick Steiner a month later at Slamboree.

==== Harlem Heat reunion; Misfits in Action (1999–2000) ====
By mid-1999, Booker T had convinced his brother, Stevie Ray, to leave the nWo and reunite Harlem Heat. Harlem Heat defeated Bam Bam Bigelow and Kanyon for the WCW World Tag Team titles at Road Wild. They lost the WCW World Tag Team titles to Barry and Kendall Windham on August 23, but Harlem Heat regained them about a month later at Fall Brawl. When The Filthy Animals were stripped of the WCW World Tag Team belts due to an injury suffered by Rey Mysterio Jr., the title was put up in a three-way dance at Halloween Havoc. Harlem Heat claimed their tenth WCW World Tag Team title defeating Hugh Morrus and Brian Knobs and Konnan and Kidman. By late 1999, a female bodybuilder named Midnight had joined Harlem Heat. Stevie neglected her help and started disputing with Booker over her.

Stevie Ray eventually challenged Midnight in a match that decided whether or not she would stay with Harlem Heat. After being defeated with a surprise small package, Stevie Ray turned on both Booker T and Midnight to form Harlem Heat, Inc. with Big T, Kash, and J. Biggs. Stevie Ray and Big T dubbed themselves Harlem Heat 2000. Throughout this period, Huffman was referred to simply as Booker, as Harlem Heat 2000 won the rights to the name "T" in a match with Big T against Booker on February 20, 2000, at SuperBrawl X. Kidman and Booker T defeated Harlem Heat 2000 (Ray and Big T) at Uncensored 2000.

When Vince Russo and Eric Bischoff formed The New Blood, Huffman eventually completely changed his in-ring persona, helping lead Captain Rection's military-themed Misfits In Action stable as G.I. Bro, reprising his gimmicks from his days in the WWA. He defeated Shawn Stasiak at the Great American Bash in a Boot Camp match. He returned to the Booker T name on the June 19 Nitro, promoting Rection to the status of General and demanding the Misfits start standing up to the New Blood.

==== WCW World Heavyweight Champion (2000–2001) ====
Booker T was elevated to main event status. After WCW booker Vince Russo grew disgruntled with Hulk Hogan's politics, he fired Hogan during the live broadcast of Bash at the Beach on July 9, and announced an impromptu match between Jeff Jarrett and Booker T for the WCW World Heavyweight Championship. Booker T won the match, in the process becoming the second ever African American champion in WCW after Ron Simmons, and the third African American to win a World Heavyweight title. He lost the title to Kevin Nash on August 28 on Nitro. He regained the title a few weeks later in a steel cage match with Nash at Fall Brawl on September 17, but again lost the title, this time to Vince Russo himself in a cage match (Russo was speared out of the cage by Goldberg and won the title), Russo vacated the title and Booker T won it for the third time in a San Francisco 49er Box Match against Jeff Jarrett on the October 2 episode of Nitro.

Booker T's next feud was with Scott Steiner, to whom he eventually lost the title in a Straitjacket steel cage match. Steiner won by TKO when he put an unconscious Booker T into the Steiner Recliner at Mayhem on November 26. Steiner was WCW's longest reigning champion in years, while Booker T was briefly out with an injury. Booker T returned to the roster and defeated Rick Steiner for the WCW United States Heavyweight Championship at Greed on March 18, 2001. This made Booker T the ninth WCW Triple Crown winner. On the final episode of Nitro on March 26, Booker T defeated Scott Steiner to win the WCW World Heavyweight Championship for the fourth time.

According to sports journalist Michael Landsberg, Huffman was salaried at "close to a million dollars a year" in WCW. He won a total of twenty-one titles within the organization, making him the most decorated performer in its history. Booker T was also the reigning WCW United States Heavyweight Champion and WCW World Heavyweight Champion when he accepted a contract with the World Wrestling Federation (WWF).

=== World Wrestling Federation/Entertainment (2001–2007) ===
==== The Alliance (2001–2002) ====
After WCW was bought by the WWF in March, Booker T made his debut at the King of the Ring pay-per-view on June 24 attacking WWF Champion Stone Cold Steve Austin during his match, promptly injuring him in his first move in the WWF. Booker T later turned heel and became a leading member of The Alliance during the Invasion storyline. In his debut match in the WWF, Booker T defended his WCW Championship against Buff Bagwell on the July 2 episode of Raw is War; sports journalist Michael Landsberg reported that many have called this bout "the worst match ever". At Invasion on July 22, The Alliance defeated Team WWF when Austin joined the Alliance. On the July 26 episode of SmackDown!, Booker T gave up his WCW United States Championship and handed it over to Chris Kanyon. He later lost the WCW Championship to Kurt Angle, but he went on to win the title back on the July 30 episode of Raw is War. Booker T kept the title until SummerSlam on August 19, when he lost it to The Rock after feuding with him over the similarity in their gimmicks and their identical finishing moves, the Book End/Rock Bottom. Booker T won the WCW Tag Team Championship for an eleventh time, this time with Test, and he also had a WWF Tag Team Championship reign with Test. At Survivor Series on November 18, Booker T was eliminated third by The Rock after a roll-up and eventually The Alliance was defeated, causing them to disband.

In its aftermath, Booker T remained a heel, and he joined forces with Vince McMahon and The Boss Man in December to feud with Stone Cold Steve Austin. After Booker T cost Austin a match against Chris Jericho for the Undisputed WWF Championship at Vengeance on December 9, Austin gained revenge in a brawl in a supermarket on the December 13 episode of SmackDown!, in which Austin won, assaulting Booker T with food. The brawl cost the company $10,000 to $15,000 in damage. Then the week after Booker T vandalized Austin's truck causing Austin to chase Booker T around a bingo hall and a church.

Booker T's first WrestleMania appearance was at WrestleMania X8 on March 17, 2002, against Edge, a match he lost. They feuded over who would appear in a fictional Japanese shampoo commercial. When the brand extension was introduced in March, Booker T was drafted to the Raw brand. At Insurrextion on May 4, Booker T briefly held the WWF Hardcore Championship twice, defeating Stevie Richards only to lose it to Crash Holly seconds later. Booker T then re-defeated Crash and lost the title to Stevie Richards a few minutes later.

==== Feud with Evolution (2002–2003) ====
Goldust began trying to start a tag team with Booker T, but Goldust kept costing Booker T matches. With the nWo now operating in WWE, Booker T was eventually invited into the nWo. His time there was short-lived, when he was kicked out of the nWo by Shawn Michaels after a superkick from Michaels. Booker T then turned face and found a partnership with Goldust and the pair teamed to battle the nWo. Booker T and Goldust had a WWE Tag Team Championship match against The Un-Americans (Christian and Lance Storm) at SummerSlam on August 25, but The Un-Americans retained after interference from Test. At No Mercy on October 20, Booker T and Goldust battled Chris Jericho and Christian for the World Tag Team Championship, but they lost the match with Jericho using the title belt on Goldust.

Booker T spent the rest of 2002 teaming with Goldust. They won the World Tag Team Championship at Armageddon on December 15 in a Tag Team Elimination match defeating the teams of Christian and Chris Jericho, Lance Storm and William Regal, and the Dudley Boyz. They held the belts for about three weeks, when they lost them to Regal and Storm on the January 6, 2003 episode of Raw. Booker T and Goldust lost the rematch and decided to go their separate ways. The gimmick for Booker T and Goldust was Goldust being a strange, yet dependable ally who Booker T eventually warmed up to after initial skepticism. However, Booker T's popularity had soared and he amicably separated from Goldust, at Goldust's request, in order to pursue the World Heavyweight Championship. On the February 24 episode of Raw, he eliminated The Rock to win a battle royal to become the number one contender to the World Heavyweight Championship at WrestleMania XIX on March 30.

Booker T targeted Evolution after Batista and Randy Orton attacked Booker T's former partner, Goldust. Several weeks before WrestleMania, the incumbent champion and Evolution's leader, Triple H, cut a controversial promo on Booker T. Triple H downplayed Booker T's WCW success, pointing out that the WCW World Heavyweight Championship had been held by non-wrestlers like booker Vince Russo and actor David Arquette, calling WCW and its title "a joke", despite the fact that, as World Heavyweight Champion, Triple H was holding the WCW World Heavyweight Championship's physical belt, the Big Gold Belt, and that Triple H's Evolution stablemate, Ric Flair, had been a multiple-time WCW World Heavyweight Champion. He said that "people like" Booker T would never win world championships in WWE. This promo is often interpreted as racist due to Triple H referencing Booker T's "nappy" hair and implying that Booker T was just in WWE to dance and entertain for "people like" Triple H. During the WrestleMania XIX press conference Michael Cole asked Triple H as to whether he had deliberately cut a racist promo, Triple H claimed this was not the case and that he was just referring to Booker T's criminal past. A week later, Booker T attacked Triple H in the bathroom and laid him out after Triple H had thrown a dollar bill at him, ordering Booker T to get him a towel. However, Booker T lost to Triple H at WrestleMania. For several weeks, he teamed with Shawn Michaels and Kevin Nash in a feud against Triple H, Ric Flair, and Chris Jericho. At Backlash on April 27, Booker T, Michaels and Nash lost to Triple H, Flair and Jericho when Triple H pinned Nash after a sledgehammer shot.

==== Various feuds (2003–2005) ====
Afterward, Booker T set his sights on the newly reactivated Intercontinental Championship. After losing a battle royal for the title at Judgment Day on May 18, Booker T feuded with the champion Christian. After a few matches, Booker T defeated Christian to become the new Intercontinental Champion on the July 7 episode of Raw. About a month later, because of a nagging back injury, Booker T lost the Intercontinental Championship back to Christian at a non-televised house show on August 10. Booker T, meanwhile, was out of action until October.

Booker T returned on the October 20 episode of Raw and subsequently joined Team Austin at Survivor Series on November 16 for a match to determine whether Eric Bischoff or Stone Cold Steve Austin (both co-general managers) would be the sole General Manager of Raw. Team Bischoff won the match. Booker T then feuded with Mark Henry, who eliminated him in the Survivor Series match. Booker T defeated Henry at Armageddon on December 14.

On the February 16, 2004, episode of Raw, Booker T and Rob Van Dam defeated Ric Flair and Batista for the World Tag Team Championship. Booker T and Van Dam held the titles for a month, even defending the belts at WrestleMania XX on March 14 in a Fatal 4-Way tag team match. Eight days later on the March 22 episode of Raw, they lost the World Tag Team Championship back to Ric Flair and Batista. He and Van Dam, never got their rematch due to Van Dam being drafted to SmackDown! that very same night.

On the March 25 episode of SmackDown!, Booker T was "traded" (along with the Dudley Boyz) to the SmackDown! brand in exchange for Triple H, but as part of a new storyline, he appeared unhappy with the move calling SmackDown! "the minor leagues" and even disrespected Eddie Guerrero, the brand's WWE Champion, turning heel in the process. Later on, Booker T bragged about how he was the biggest star on SmackDown! and feuded with The Undertaker. Booker T tried to utilize voodoo magic to try to overcome his "supernatural" foe; however, it did nothing to prevent him from losing to the Undertaker at Judgment Day on May 16.

In mid-2004, Booker T set his sights on the United States Championship along with its champion, John Cena. After Cena got on the bad side of general manager Kurt Angle, he did his best to get the title away from Cena. Cena successfully defended the title at The Great American Bash on June 27 in a four-way elimination match against Booker T, René Duprée, and Rob Van Dam. After Cena was stripped of his title by Angle for "laying a hand" on the general manager on the July 8 episode of SmackDown!, Booker T took advantage of the situation and won an eight-man elimination match to win the vacant United States Championship, thus becoming the one-hundredth United States Champion in history, in a match that also featured Cena, Dupree, Billy Gunn, Charlie Haas, Luther Reigns, Kenzo Suzuki and Van Dam. Booker T won by last eliminating both Cena and Van Dam in the course of less than 10 seconds. After Angle was fired by Mr. McMahon for embellishing his injuries, Theodore Long began his first tenure as SmackDown! General Manager, and booked a best-of-five series of matches for the United States Championship between Booker T and Cena. The first match took place at SummerSlam on August 15 and saw Cena gain the pinfall victory to go up 1–0 in the series. Booker T would bounce back and win the next two matches, on the August 26 edition of SmackDown! and a live event the next night, to take a 2–1 lead. The next match in the series wouldn't come until the September 16 SmackDown!, where Cena won and tied the series at two apiece. The series culminated at No Mercy on October 3, where Cena won the series 3–2, and thusly, the United States Championship.

On the October 21 episode of SmackDown!, SmackDown! General Manager Theodore Long placed Booker T in a six-man tag team match with Rob Van Dam and Rey Mysterio against John "Bradshaw" Layfield (JBL), René Duprée, and Kenzo Suzuki. JBL expected Booker T to betray his partners, but instead Booker T pinned JBL, thus turning face again. Booker T faced JBL for the WWE Championship at the Survivor Series on November 14, but lost after he was hit in the head with the championship belt. The next night, Booker T demanded a rematch, citing Orlando Jordan's interference. He was then joined by Eddie Guerrero and The Undertaker who also wanted a shot at JBL's title, prompting Theodore Long to make a fatal four-way match for the WWE Championship at Armageddon on December 12. Once again, Booker T failed to win the title, as JBL retained it. He then briefly teamed with Eddie Guerrero, at one point challenging Mysterio and Van Dam for the WWE Tag Team Championship, and feuded with Heidenreich.

Booker T won a 30-man Battle Royal dark match at WrestleMania 21 on April 3, 2005, after last eliminating Raw's Viscera and Chris Masters. Subsequently, Booker T was part of the tournament to name a new number one contender for the WWE Championship and made it to the Final Four. After Kurt Angle eliminated Booker T, he returned the favor, costing Angle the match against JBL. The storyline then turned to a sexual nature, as Angle began stalking Booker T's new wife, Sharmell. Booker T defeated Angle at Judgment Day on May 22. On the May 26 episode of SmackDown!, Booker T participated in a "Winners Choice" Battle Royal, with the winner choosing his opponent for the next week. Kurt Angle won and wanted to wrestle Sharmell. Booker T protested, and the match was made into a Handicap match. Angle won by pinning Sharmell in a sexual position. The next week, Booker T gained revenge on Angle, defeating him with a Scissors Kick.

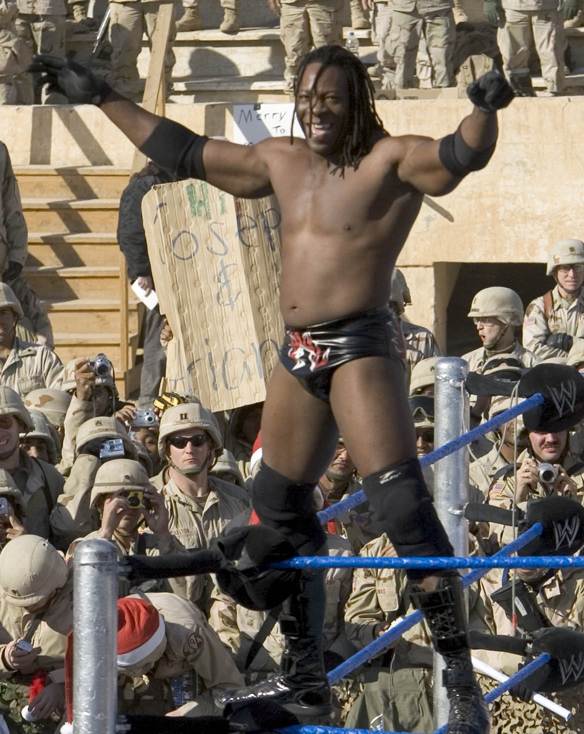
Booker at Tribute to the Troops in 2004

On the June 30 episode of SmackDown!, JBL defeated Christian, The Undertaker, Chris Benoit, Muhammad Hassan, and Booker T in a six-man elimination match for the SmackDown! Championship. During the match, Booker T got specifically involved with Christian. Booker T later defeated Christian at The Great American Bash on July 24.

==== United States Champion (2005–2006) ====
Booker T began teaming with Chris Benoit, eying his United States Championship again. Benoit was allowed to pick his next challenger to see who would face him at No Mercy on October 9, so Booker T, Christian, and Orlando Jordan tried to impress Benoit by winning matches. He instead decided not choose one opponent, so he made it a fatal four-way for No Mercy, where Benoit successfully defended his title. On the October 21 episode of SmackDown!, Booker T defeated Benoit for the United States Championship, due to unseen help from Sharmell. Theodore Long later showed footage of Sharmell interfering in Booker's matches. Booker T went to apologize to Benoit and give him a rematch, but then attacked Benoit, busting him open with the United States title belt and turning heel in the process. Booker T then boasted that he had been fully aware of what Sharmell had been doing and had been playing dumb to fool everyone.

On the November 25 episode of SmackDown!, Booker T defended the United States Championship against Benoit. The match ended when Benoit suplexed Booker T and two referees made a three count on either competitor, claiming that their wrestler had won. Booker T was stripped of the belt by Theodore Long, because of the confusion of who won since they pinned each other at the same time. Long decided to put Benoit and Booker T against each other in a best of seven series, just as the two had in their WCW days. Booker T took an early 3–0 lead; winning the first three matches at Survivor Series on November 27, the November 29 SmackDown! special, and the December 9 episode of SmackDown!. In a must win match during Armageddon on December 18, Benoit was able to defeat Booker T to bring the series to 3–1. At a house show, Booker T was injured, and he did not wrestle again until after the "Best of Seven" series with Benoit was completed. Booker T was scheduled to face Benoit in Match 5 of the Best of Seven Series at the December 30 taping of SmackDown!. At the beginning of the show, general manager Theodore Long said that Booker T would have to forfeit. Both Booker T and Benoit protested, with Benoit not wanting a cheap victory. Booker T managed to persuade Long to allow him to choose a stand-in for the matches. Booker T chose Randy Orton as his replacement. Benoit was able to tie the series 3–3 after beating Orton in two consecutive matches on the December 30 and January 6, 2006, episodes of SmackDown!. Orton, however, was able to defeat Benoit in the final match on the January 13 episode of SmackDown! to win the series and the title for Booker T, who held the title until No Way Out on February 19 where Benoit won it back.

On the February 24 episode of SmackDown!, Booker T and Sharmell provided guest commentary for a match involving The Boogeyman. After defeating his opponents, The Boogeyman dumped a bucket of worms onto the announce table where they were sitting, frightening the two. Over the next few weeks, The Boogeyman would stalk Booker T and Sharmell. Booker T and The Boogeyman were set to face off on the March 18 Saturday Night's Main Event XXXII, but the match was canceled due to Booker T faking a knee injury to escape competition. The feud eventually culminated at WrestleMania 22 on April 2, with Booker T and Sharmell losing to The Boogeyman. The couple received a restraining order against The Boogeyman on the April 7 episode of SmackDown!, ending the feud.

==== King Booker; World Heavyweight Champion (2006–2007) ====
Booker T next entered the 2006 King of the Ring tournament on SmackDown!, advancing through to the finals due to a bye as his semi-final opponent, Kurt Angle, was unable to wrestle. The finals were held at Judgment Day on May 21 where Booker T defeated Bobby Lashley. Upon winning the King of the Ring tournament, Booker T began wrestling as "King Booker" and began acting like he was an actual monarch ruling "The SmackDown! Kingdom". King Booker formed a royal court that included his wife, Queen Sharmell, Sir William Regal, and Sir Finlay, and began including the mannerisms and attire of a stereotypical English-style king as part of the character, all the way down to wearing a crown and cape and speaking in a fake English accent. However, whenever King Booker would get angry he would launch into a tirade in the style of Booker T (an example of this was an episode of SmackDown! where Theodore Long would inform him he would be facing The Undertaker), which lent some comedic aspect to the character; he even went as far as having Lashley kiss his "royal" feet.

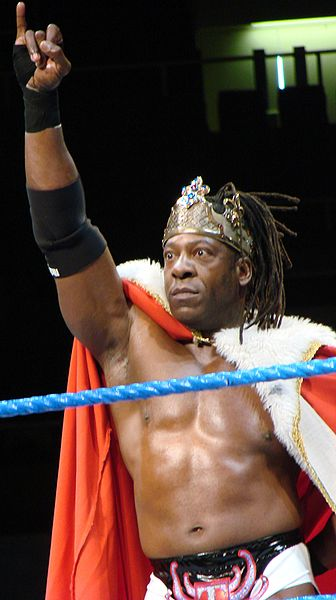
King Booker's signature pose

After gaining his title of King, King Booker continued to feud with Lashley. After Lashley defeated John "Bradshaw" Layfield (JBL) for the United States Championship at the end of May, King Booker began chasing after the title and even resorted to making Lashley kiss his "royal feet" on the June 2 episode of SmackDown!. The feud ended after a steel cage match on the June 30 episode of SmackDown! where Lashley defeated King Booker by escaping the cage to retain the United States Championship.

The next week, King Booker entered a battle royal on SmackDown! with the winner to challenge Rey Mysterio for his World Heavyweight Championship at The Great American Bash on July 23. King Booker won the battle royal and then defeated Mysterio at The Great American Bash to win the World Heavyweight Championship after Chavo Guerrero betrayed Mysterio by hitting him with a steel chair. This was King Booker's first world championship since joining WWE and the win caused him to proclaim himself as the "King of the World". This win would also make King Booker the sixteenth Triple Crown Champion and eighth Grand Slam Champion (under the original format) in the history of the WWE.

After King Booker won the World Heavyweight Championship, he began a rivalry with the returning former champion Batista, who vowed to regain the title he was forced to forfeit due to injury. This rivalry spilled over to real life when the two got into a legitimate fistfight at a SummerSlam pay-per-view commercial shoot, reportedly due to Batista considering himself superior to the rest of the roster due to his quick climb to main event status. According to sources, both men were left bloodied and bruised, however Booker was reportedly praised by many wrestlers in the back for speaking his mind to Batista about his attitude. At SummerSlam on August 20, King Booker lost to Batista by disqualification after Queen Sharmell interfered on his behalf (thus retaining the title), but at No Mercy on October 8, King Booker defeated Batista, Lashley and his own stablemate, Finlay, in a Fatal 4-Way match. Before the match, King Booker assaulted Sir William Regal, resulting in the breakup of the King's Court.

Despite the break-up of his Court, King Booker lost to Batista by disqualification on the October 20 episode on SmackDown!, due to interference from WWE Champion John Cena from Raw and ECW World Champion Big Show, the two of whom King Booker was to face at Cyber Sunday on November 5 in a "champion of champions" match. At Cyber Sunday, the fans voted for the World Heavyweight Championship to be on the line. King Booker retained after defeating Big Show and Cena with help from Kevin Federline.

After Cyber Sunday, the feud between King Booker and Batista continued with Batista unable to wrestle the title from King Booker. Eventually this led to a match at Survivor Series on November 26, where King Booker declared that if Batista failed to defeat him this time, it would be the last World Heavyweight Championship match he would receive as long as King Booker was champion. At Survivor Series, SmackDown! General Manager Theodore Long decided that if King Booker got counted out or disqualified, he would lose the title. Late in the match, Queen Sharmell handed Booker his title belt while referee Nick Patrick was not looking. While she had Patrick distracted, King Booker attempted to hit Batista with the belt. Batista moved out of the way, knocked the belt out of King Booker's hands and hit him in the head with it, and King Booker lost the World Heavyweight Championship to Batista. After losing the title, King Booker feuded alongside former royal court member Finlay against Batista and John Cena, which led up to Armageddon on December 17 where they lost.

While competing in the Royal Rumble match on January 28, 2007, King Booker was eliminated by Kane. A frustrated King Booker returned to the ring illegally and eliminated Kane. This started a short feud between the two resulting in a match at No Way Out on February 18, which Kane won. On the February 23 episode of SmackDown!, King Booker won a Falls Count Anywhere Money in the Bank qualifying match, defeating Kane (with assistance from The Great Khali) and earned himself a spot in the match at WrestleMania 23 on April 1. At WrestleMania, Matt Hardy set up Sharmell for a Twist of Fate during the Money in the Bank match with the briefcase in King Booker's grasp – thus forcing him to choose between a guaranteed title shot and his wife. He chose to defend Sharmell and lost the match. On the April 6 episode of SmackDown!, King Booker attempted to take revenge. However, he lost the match against Matt Hardy, and Sharmell declared her disappointment in him and slapped him. In an attempt to impress Sharmell, King Booker attacked The Undertaker but was Tombstoned on an announcers' table. King Booker was removed from television to deal with a knee injury.

==== WWE Championship pursuit and departure (2007) ====
On the June 11 episode of Raw, both King Booker and Queen Sharmell were drafted to the Raw brand as part of the WWE Draft. He then began a short feud with John Cena over the WWE Championship, and King Booker would wrestle Cena in a Five Pack Challenge along with Bobby Lashley, Mick Foley and Randy Orton at Vengeance: Night of Champions on June 24 for the title in a losing effort. Cena would retain at the event by pinning Foley. On the July 16 episode of Raw, King Booker came to the ring using Triple H's theme music "The King of Kings", even using his video. King Booker declared that neither Triple H nor Jerry Lawler could be known as "The King". King Booker began a feud with Lawler, defeating him on the August 6 episode of Raw where the loser had to crown the winner the next week. When the time came, Lawler refused, declaring that Triple H was still a king and announcing that King Booker would battle Triple H at SummerSlam on August 26. King Booker attacked Lawler, throwing him into the ring post and hitting him with a television monitor. At SummerSlam, King Booker lost to the returning Triple H. On the August 27 episode of Raw, King Booker wrestled against John Cena in a non-title match, which he lost by disqualification when Randy Orton interfered.

In August, he was linked to Signature Pharmacy, a company thought to be distributing performance-enhancing drugs. He was suspended by WWE for violating its Wellness Policy. He denied using any drugs and being a customer of Signature Pharmacy. In October 2007, Booker T requested his and Sharmell's release from their WWE contracts due to the pressure he had in WWE and being burned out, which WWE granted.

=== Total Nonstop Action Wrestling (2007–2010) ===
==== Feud with Bobby Roode (2007–2008) ====
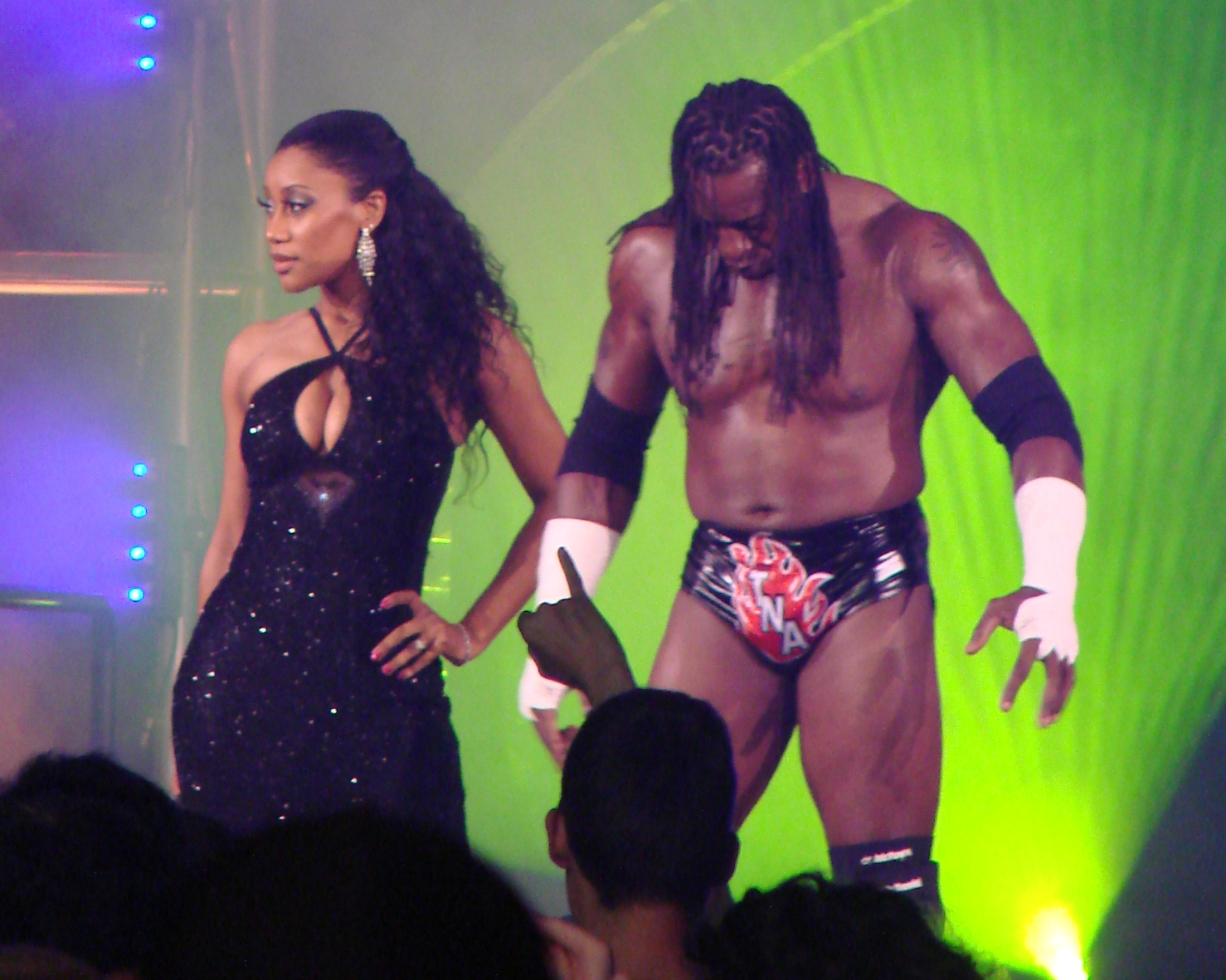
Booker T (right) and Sharmell in TNA

At the Genesis pay-per-view on November 11, Huffman debuted in Total Nonstop Action Wrestling (TNA) as Sting's mystery partner in a tag team match against Kurt Angle and Kevin Nash for the TNA World Heavyweight Championship, reverting to his Booker T character. His wife Sharmell also debuted, interfering in the match on Booker T and Sting's behalf when Karen Angle interfered on behalf of Kurt Angle and Nash.

On the November 29 episode of Impact!, Booker T said he came to TNA to test his skills against the young talent, take TNA to a higher level, and win the TNA World Heavyweight Championship. Robert Roode came to the ring and challenged Booker T to a match, claiming he has been pushed down by washed-up wrestlers and has-beens. Booker T won his Impact! debut match, but afterwards, Christian Cage and Robert Roode beat down Booker T until Kaz made the save. At Turning Point on December 2, Booker T and Kaz defeated Roode and Cage when Booker T pinned Cage. Booker T and Sharmell won a mixed tag team match against Robert Roode and Ms. Brooks at Final Resolution on January 6, 2008. After the match, Roode punched Sharmell in the face, leading to a match at Against All Odds on February 10. While the punch was intended to be a work, Roode had in fact made contact with Sharmell during the punch, dislocating her jaw and causing her to be off television for a few weeks, therefore making it into a shoot. The rivalry, however, went ahead as planned where Booker T and Roode wrestled to a double-countout at Against All Odds, which saw them brawl to the parking lot. Roode defeated Booker T in a strap match at Destination X on March 9 after hitting Booker T with a pair of handcuffs. On a special live episode of Impact!, Booker T and Roode had another outing, this time with the fans being able to vote on the stipulation of the match. At Booker T's request during a pre-match promo, the match became a First Blood Match, beating the Last Man Standing and I Quit stipulations. Booker T would go on to win the match-up. At Lockdown on April 13, Booker T and Sharmell defeated Robert Roode and Payton Banks after Sharmell pinned Banks with a roll-up.

==== Main Event Mafia (2008–2010) ====
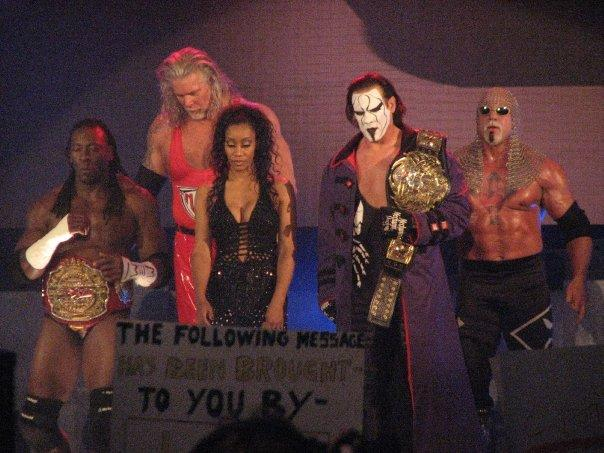
Booker T (left) as part of the Main Event Mafia in TNA. At this time Booker was the TNA Legends (later Television) Champion

Booker T turned heel for the first time in TNA at Sacrifice on May 11 by attacking Christian Cage and Rhino from behind with a steel chair. This came about as a result of losing a tag team match up against Christian Cage and Rhino, with them furthering themselves in the Deuces Wild Tag Team Tournament. Booker T then competed in the King of the Mountain match for the TNA World Heavyweight Championship at Slammiversary on June 8. He was seconds away from winning the match, when Kevin Nash stopped him and performed a Jackknife Powerbomb; Samoa Joe would later go on to win the match. On the next Impact!, Booker T challenged Joe to a title match at Victory Road on July 13, which Joe would later accept. Also around this time he reverted to a gimmick similar to his King Booker gimmick albeit while proclaiming himself a supposed king of Africa. The match at Victory Road ended in a draw after Sharmell replaced the referee and counted after the match was already over. At Hard Justice on August 10, Samoa Joe defeated Booker T after a guitar shot, thus reclaiming physical possession of the title belt, which Booker T had kept after Victory Road. At Bound for Glory IV on October 12, Booker T defeated A.J. Styles and Christian Cage in a Three Way War. Later he introduced the TNA Legends Championship and became the first official champion. Booker T successfully defended the title at Turning Point on November 9 against Cage. At Final Resolution on December 7, Booker T, Kevin Nash, Scott Steiner, and Sting defeated The TNA Front Line (A.J. Styles, Brother Devon, Brother Ray, and Samoa Joe) in an eight-man tag team match to allow Sting to retain his TNA World Heavyweight Championship. At Genesis on January 11, 2009, Booker T, Scott Steiner, and Cute Kip lost a six-man tag team match to Mick Foley, A.J. Styles, and Brother Devon. The next month at Against All Odds on February 8, Booker T defeated Shane Sewell to retain the Legends Championship. Booker T lost the title to A.J. Styles at Destination X on March 15. At Lockdown on April 19, Team Angle (Booker T, Kevin Nash, Kurt Angle, and Scott Steiner) lost to Team Jarrett (A.J. Styles, Christopher Daniels, Jeff Jarrett, and Samoa Joe) in a Lethal Lockdown match. At Sacrifice on May 24, Booker T received a rematch for the Legends Championship, but lost to A.J. Styles in a "I Quit" match.

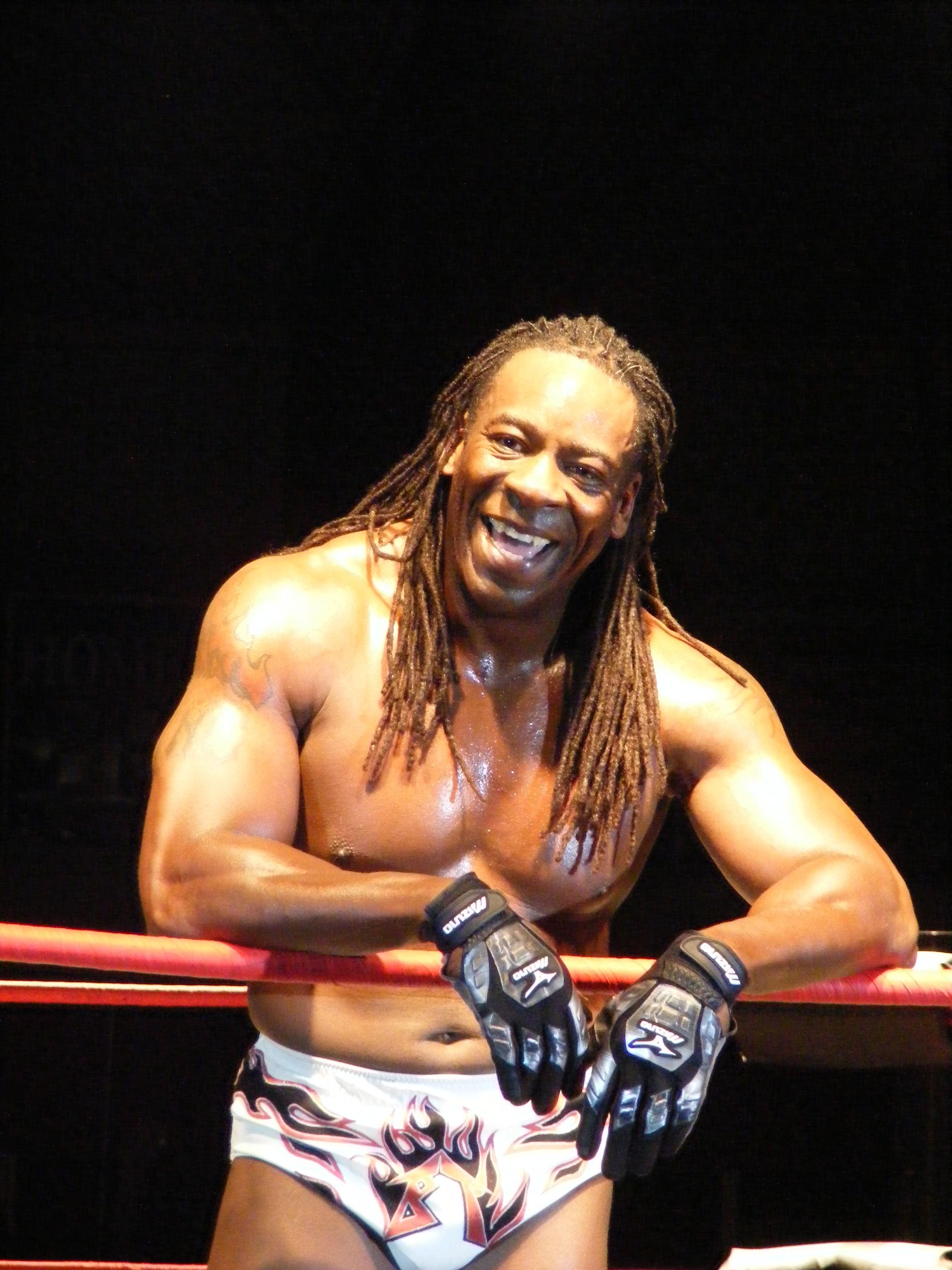
Booker T on Impact! in 2008

Booker T went go on to form the Main Event Mafia's resident tag team with Scott Steiner, and at Victory Road on July 19, Steiner and Booker T defeated Beer Money, Inc. to win the TNA World Tag Team Championship, marking Booker T's 15th World Tag Team title reign overall. Then at Hard Justice on August 16, Booker T and Steiner retained the World Tag Team Championship against Team 3D. Prior to No Surrender, Booker T, Steiner, and British Invasion won a match to gain the man advantage at No Surrender's Lethal Lockdown match against Team 3D and Beer Money, Inc. Even with the advantage, Booker T's team lost at No Surrender on September 20 when James Storm of Beer Money pinned Doug Williams of The British Invasion. At Bound for Glory on October 18, Booker T and Steiner lost the TNA World Tag Team Titles to the British Invasion in a four way Full Metal Mayhem Tag Team match, which also included Team 3D and Beer Money; during the match Booker T was taken out on a stretcher. Afterwards it was reported that Bound for Glory had been Booker T's final appearance with TNA, and his and Sharmell's profiles were removed from the official TNA roster. On May 21, 2010, Booker T made a one night return to TNA at a live event in Lake Charles, Louisiana, replacing A.J. Styles, who was unable to attend the event due to travel issues, and wrestled Rob Van Dam for the TNA World Heavyweight Championship in a losing effort.

=== Puerto Rico and Mexico (2009–2010) ===
Booker T debuted in the International Wrestling Association (IWA) on Histeria Boricua, a special event held on January 6, 2009. There he was booked against Chicano, the incumbent IWA Undisputed Heavyweight Champion. The match was won by Cotto, who reversed a "Book End" attempt and scored a pinfall victory. On July 11, 2010, Booker T was booked by World Wrestling Council in a match against Carlito which also involved Orlando Colón and El Mesias. On September 16, 2010, Booker T made his debut for Mexican promotion Perros del Mal. In the main event of the evening he teamed up with Dr. Wagner Jr. and El Mesías, who represented rival promotion AAA, against El Hijo del Perro Aguayo, Damián 666 and Halloween. After Aguayo pinned El Mesías, Booker turned on Wagner, unmasked him and joined Perros del Mal.

=== Return to WWE (2011–present) ===
==== Color commentator and part-time wrestler (2011–2012) ====
On January 30, 2011, Booker T returned to WWE to take part in the Royal Rumble. Booker T entered the match at number 21 and was eliminated by Mason Ryan. On the February 1 taping of SmackDown, Booker T debuted as the show's new color commentator, working beside Josh Mathews and Michael Cole, replacing Matt Striker. He coached on the returning Tough Enough competition, and at Elimination Chamber he introduced Trish Stratus as a fellow coach. At WrestleMania XXVII Booker T was on commentary during the Jerry Lawler vs. Michael Cole match. He would become involved in the match during the event. After the disqualification win for Cole, Booker T appeared in-ring post match alongside Stone Cold Steve Austin and Lawler and after a Spinaroonie, received a Stone Cold Stunner from Austin. On the June 6 episode of Raw, Booker T wrestled his first match on the brand in four years, gaining a victory against Jack Swagger by count out. On the November 21 episode of Raw, Cody Rhodes threw water in Booker T's face after Rhodes allegedly heard Booker T criticize him, thus starting a conflict between the two. On the November 29 episode of SmackDown Booker T was scheduled to face Rhodes in a match but it did not happen after Rhodes attacked him from behind him during a backstage interview. On the December 9 episode of SmackDown, Rhodes attacked Booker T again while heading to the announcer's table leaving him with paramedics. Later that night, Booker T attacked Rhodes during his match with Daniel Bryan, leading to an Intercontinental Championship match at TLC: Tables, Ladders & Chairs, which Rhodes won. On the December 26 episode of Raw, Booker T defeated Rhodes in a non-title match. On the January 6, 2012, episode of SmackDown, Booker T challenged Rhodes a second time for the Intercontinental Championship, but once again failed to win the title.

Booker T along with fellow commentators Jerry Lawler and Michael Cole all participated in the 2012 Royal Rumble. On the March 26, 2012, episode of Raw, Booker T saved Teddy Long from an attempted attack by Mark Henry, thus becoming the sixth and final member of Team Teddy at WrestleMania XXVIII, where Team Johnny emerged victorious. This was his last official match for the WWE until his Royal Rumble appearance in 2023. On the July 9 episode of Raw, Jerry Lawler won by pinfall against Michael Cole in a WrestleMania XXVII rematch. However, Booker T, who was substituting for Lawler on commentary, threw Cole back into the ring after he tried to escape. This caused the anonymous Raw General Manager to reverse the decision and give Cole the win as a result of a disqualification.

==== SmackDown General Manager and Hall of Fame (2012–2013) ====
On August 3, 2012, Vince McMahon appointed Booker T as the new general manager of SmackDown during Friday Night Smackdown's show. Booker T would quickly add Eve Torres and Theodore Long to his staff, as his assistant and senior adviser respectively.

Booker T was inducted into the WWE Hall of Fame by his brother, Stevie Ray, the night before WrestleMania 29. On the April 19 SmackDown, Booker T became angry with Long for making matches without his consent. Big Show arrived and thanked Long for doing a better job than Booker T, further infuriating him. On the April 22 Raw, upset with Long for making a World Heavyweight Championship match at Extreme Rules, made it a Triple Threat match. Booker T took time off for a torn distal triceps, and had surgery for it on June 12. On the July 19 SmackDown, he returned to continue as SmackDown General Manager, but soon lost the job to Vickie Guerrero, on Vince McMahon's orders.

==== Return to commentary and pre-show panelist (2014–present) ====
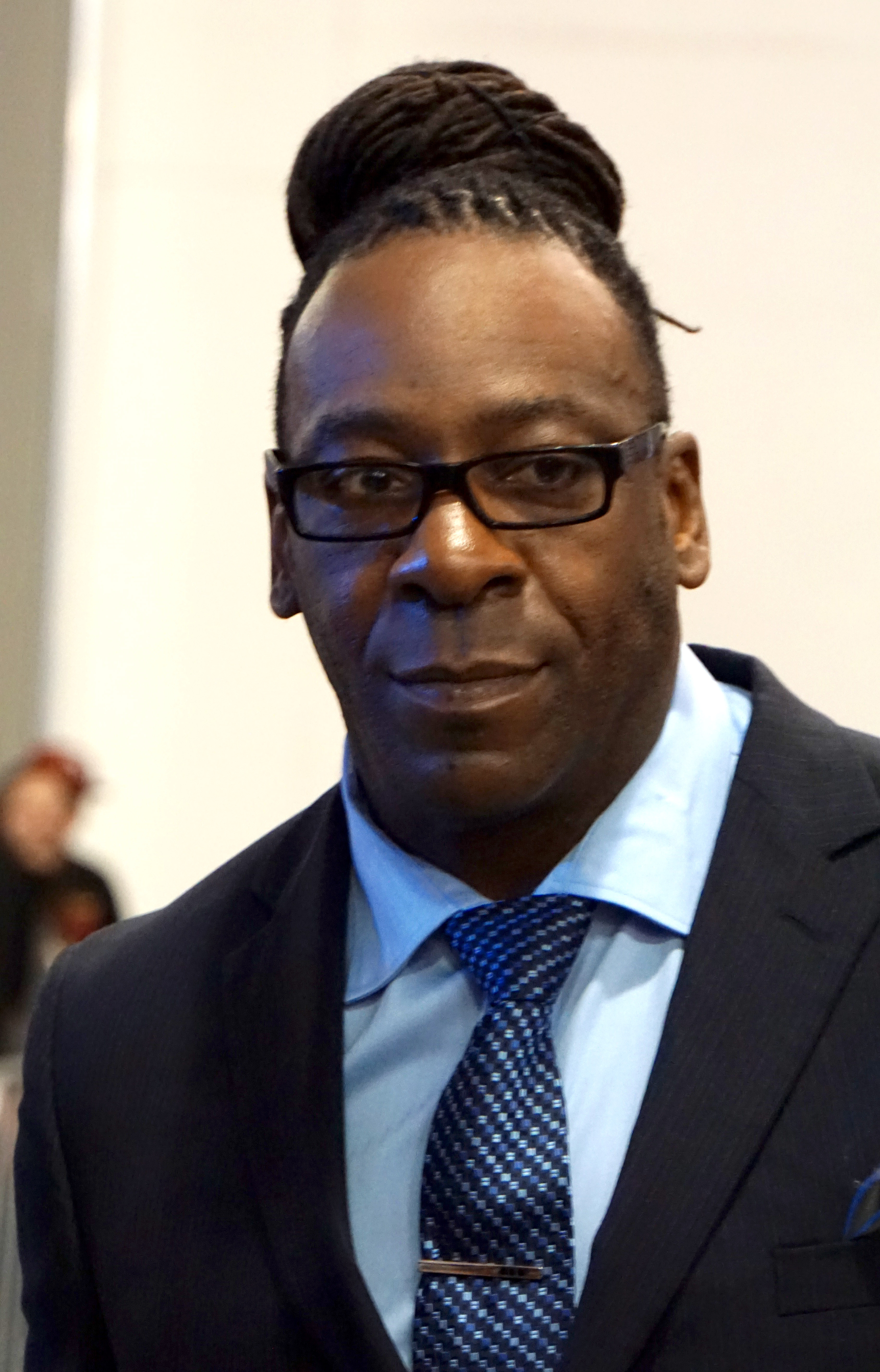
Booker T in March 2015

Since 2014, Booker T has commonly done work on the WWE Network, including the Raw pre-show and also being a part of the "expert panel" on Kickoff shows before each pay-per-view event.

On the 2015 premiere of Raw, Booker T replaced Jerry Lawler, who was suffering from diverticulitis, for commentating. However, it was later announced that Booker would be returning on a full-time basis to take Lawler's place on Raw, with Lawler moving to SmackDown. On the March 30 episode of Raw, Booker, along with JBL and Michael Cole, were injured by Brock Lesnar after Seth Rollins refused Lesnar his WWE World Heavyweight Championship rematch. Booker was replaced by Byron Saxton for commentating as he became a coach for the sixth season of WWE Tough Enough.

On August 6, 2016, Booker T replaced Tommy Dreamer in an intergender tag team match for Dreamer's House of Hardcore promotion. Booker T returned to his old "King Booker" gimmick in a segment with the SmackDown Live Survivor Series tag teams where he gave a motivational speech and convinced Breezango (Tyler Breeze and Fandango) to join the team.

In December 2016, after Jerry Lawler and Lita left the pre-show team, WWE ended their Raw and SmackDown pre-shows leaving Booker T to the WWE pay-per-view pre-shows and other WWE Network specials. Following the 2017 WWE Superstar Shake-up, Booker T replaced David Otunga as color commentator on Raw. On the January 29, 2018, episode of Raw, Booker was replaced on commentary by the returning Jonathan Coachman. On the August 28 episode of SmackDown Live Booker T made a surprise appearance as "King Booker" in the opening segment when he interrupted and joined in on The New Day's "five timers" celebration, following the latter's fifth tag team championship win. To help commemorate the achievement, King Booker acknowledged The New Day's entry into the "five timers' club" and he and The New Day all performed Spinaroonies.

In 2020, Booker made his return by wrestling at his Reality of Wrestling promotion.

On October 6, 2022, WWE announced that they had shuffled their commentary and interview teams, with Booker joining the NXT commentary team alongside Vic Joseph.

Booker returned to the ring in WWE as a surprise entrant in the 2023 Royal Rumble on January 28 but was eliminated by Gunther in 42 seconds, which would mark his final in-ring appearance as he later announced on his podcast that he was retired due to his age and had listed the wrestling attire he wore at the Royal Rumble on eBay.

In January 2025, Booker came out of retirement for Reality of Wrestling against Zilla Fatu in a winning effort.

Since 2026, Booker has provided alternative commentary alongside Vic Joseph on SiriusXM’s WWE Radio channel for pay-per-view events.

== Legacy ==
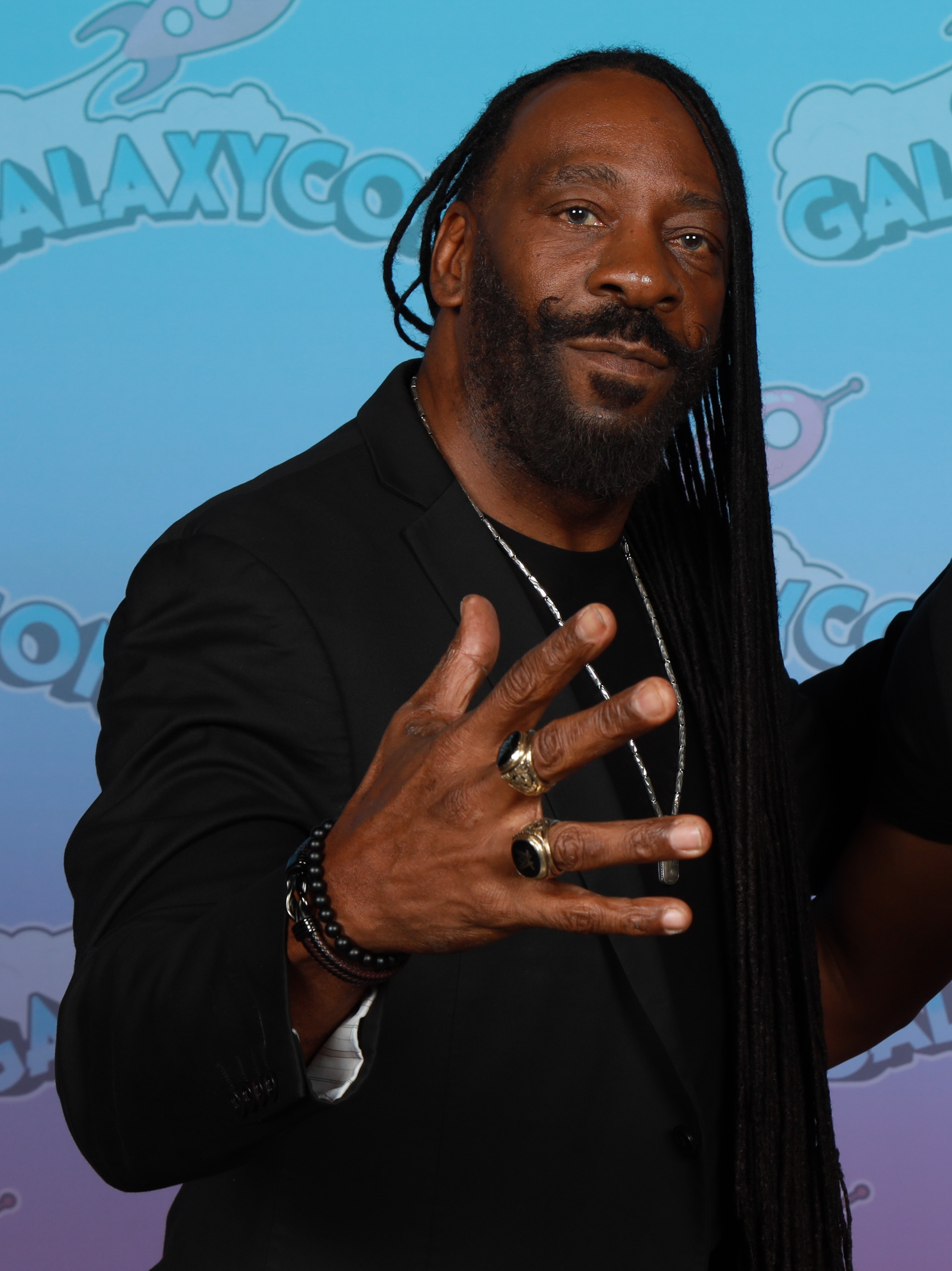
Booker T at GalaxyCon in March 2025

Longtime wrestler Kurt Angle said of Booker T: "He's done it all... he legitimately is one of the top five best of all time." In 2001, sports journalist Michael Landsberg stated that Booker T was considered "one of the best wrestlers alive" and was capable of "any match, any style". Industry veteran John Layfield later described him as "the best acquisition that WWE got when they bought WCW" in 2001.

He was the first African-American WCW World Television Champion. Harlem Heat were recognized by WWE as being, along with The Steiner Brothers, WCW's greatest tag team. Considering both Booker T's WCW and WWF/E accolades, WWE recognizes him as one of the most decorated performers of all time.

With his fifth WCW Championship win (which occurred in the WWF), Booker T became the second African-American to win a world championship in WWF/E (after The Rock) and the first who was not mixed race. Booker T was voted WWE's greatest World Heavyweight Champion in a 2013 viewer poll.

== Other media ==
In 2000, Booker appeared in the film Ready to Rumble as himself. He has appeared in an episode of Charmed season 3 "Wrestling with Demons" alongside Buff Bagwell and Scott Steiner. In 2001, along with several other WWE wrestlers, Booker competed on an episode of The Weakest Link, being eliminated second from the show. He has also appeared on Comedy Central and MTV.

In 2001, Booker appeared in an episode of The Jersey called The Sadie Incident alongside Scott Steiner

On January 13, 2004, the album WWE Originals was released, featuring Booker T performing "Can You Dig It?". On April 21, 2007, Booker began hosting a radio show titled Tea Time with King Booker on KBME 790 AM in Houston. During the week of November 5, 2007, he appeared on Family Feud with several other WWE wrestlers.

On September 1, 2012, Booker released his first autobiography, Booker T: From Prison to Promise, with Medallion Press. Booker T made appearances to promote the book with The Score Television Network with Arda Ocal which aired on August 29, 2012. He conducted a sixteen-page interview with Pro Wrestling Illustrated in the 2012 volume #50 issue.

On March 10, 2015, Booker released his second autobiography, Booker T: Wrestling Royalty with Medallion Press.

In 2015, Booker T started a show on KILT (AM) that is also a podcast on Radio.com called "Heated Conversations – with Booker T". The show is aired on Saturday nights locally in Houston, Texas, and covers subjects from wrestling, MMA, and boxing to many other sports. It has featured the biggest names from the WWE, as well as NBA stars like Dwight Howard.

In February 2019, Booker T sued video game company Activision over the Call of Duty: Black Ops 4 character David "Prophet" Wilkes. The lawsuit claimed that the Black Ops character contained similarities to Booker's GI Bro comic book character.

In 2019, Booker T and his co-host Brad Gilmore joined the Houston ESPN affiliate, ESPN 97.5 KFNC for their weekly show "The Hall of Fame with Booker T and Brad Gilmore".

Booker T has been featured as part of a song named after him by Puerto Rican rapper and singer Bad Bunny.

On May 9, 2022, Booker was the subject of an episode of Biography: WWE Legends.

Booker appeared in a 2023 episode of Pawn Stars in which he was asked to authenticate a pair of boots that he once wore and confirmed that he did; he stated that he donated them to a charity auction to support the victims of Hurricane Harvey.

In June 2024, Booker and Brad Gilmore announced that their radio show The Hall of Fame had signed a deal with Disney and ESPN to broadcast the show on ESPN Radio nationally.

=== Filmography ===
| Year | Title | Role | Notes |
|---|---|---|---|
| 2000 | Ready to Rumble | Self | Acting debut |
| 2001 | Charmed | Thunder | Episode: "Wrestling with Demons" |
| 2001 | The Weakest Link | Self | Episode: "WWF Sueprstars Edition" |
| 2005 | MTV's The 70s House | Self | Episode: "Dodge Ball" |
| 2007 | Family Feud | Self | 4 episodes |
| 2011 | WWE Tough Enough | Self | 11 episodes |
| 2020 | Penance Lane | Shooter | Cameo |
| 2021 | Booker T | Self | Music video |
| 2023 | Pawn Stars | Self | Episode: "May the Miniforce Be With You" |
| 2023–2024 | WWE's Most Wanted Treasures | Self | Host |
| 2025–2026 | WWE LFG | Self | Coach |
| 2026 | Agent of Shadows | The General | Microdrama series |

== Video games ==
WCW video games
| Year | Title | Notes |
|---|---|---|
| 1998 | WCW Nitro | Video game debut |
| 1998 | WCW/nWo Revenge | |
| 1999 | WCW/nWo Thunder | |
| 1999 | WCW Mayhem | |
| 2000 | WCW Backstage Assault | |

WWE video games
| Year | Title | Notes |
|---|---|---|
| 2002 | WWE WrestleMania X8 | |
| 2002 | WWE Road to WrestleMania X8 | |
| 2002 | WWE SmackDown! Shut Your Mouth | Cover athlete |
| 2003 | WWE Crush Hour | |
| 2003 | WWE WrestleMania XIX | |
| 2003 | WWE Raw 2 | |
| 2003 | WWE SmackDown! Here Comes the Pain | |
| 2004 | WWE Day of Reckoning | |
| 2004 | WWE Survivor Series | |
| 2004 | WWE SmackDown! vs. Raw | |
| 2005 | WWE WrestleMania 21 | |
| 2005 | WWE Aftershock | |
| 2005 | WWE Day of Reckoning 2 | |
| 2005 | WWE SmackDown! vs. Raw 2006 | |
| 2006 | WWE SmackDown vs. Raw 2007 | |
| 2007 | WWE SmackDown vs. Raw 2008 | Billed as "King Booker" |
| 2011 | WWE '12 | |
| 2012 | WWE '13 | |
| 2014 | WWE SuperCard | |
| 2014 | WWE 2K15 | Motion capture (Next-gen & PC) |
| 2015 | WWE 2K | |
| 2015 | WWE 2K16 | Motion capture (Next-gen & PC) |
| 2015 | WWE Immortals | |
| 2016 | WWE 2K17 | Motion capture (Next-gen & PC) |
| 2017 | WWE 2K18 | Motion capture |
| 2017 | WWE Champions | |
| 2018 | WWE 2K19 | Motion capture |
| 2019 | WWE 2K20 | Motion capture |
| 2020 | WWE 2K Battlegrounds | |
| 2022 | WWE 2K22 | King Booker and Booker T |
| 2023 | WWE 2K23 | King Booker and Booker T |
| 2024 | WWE 2K24 | |
| 2025 | WWE 2K25 | |
| 2026 | WWE 2K26 | |

TNA video games
| Year | Title | Notes |
|---|---|---|
| 2008 | TNA Impact! | Cover athlete |
| 2008 | TNA Wrestling | Mobile game |

== Personal life ==
=== Relationships and family ===
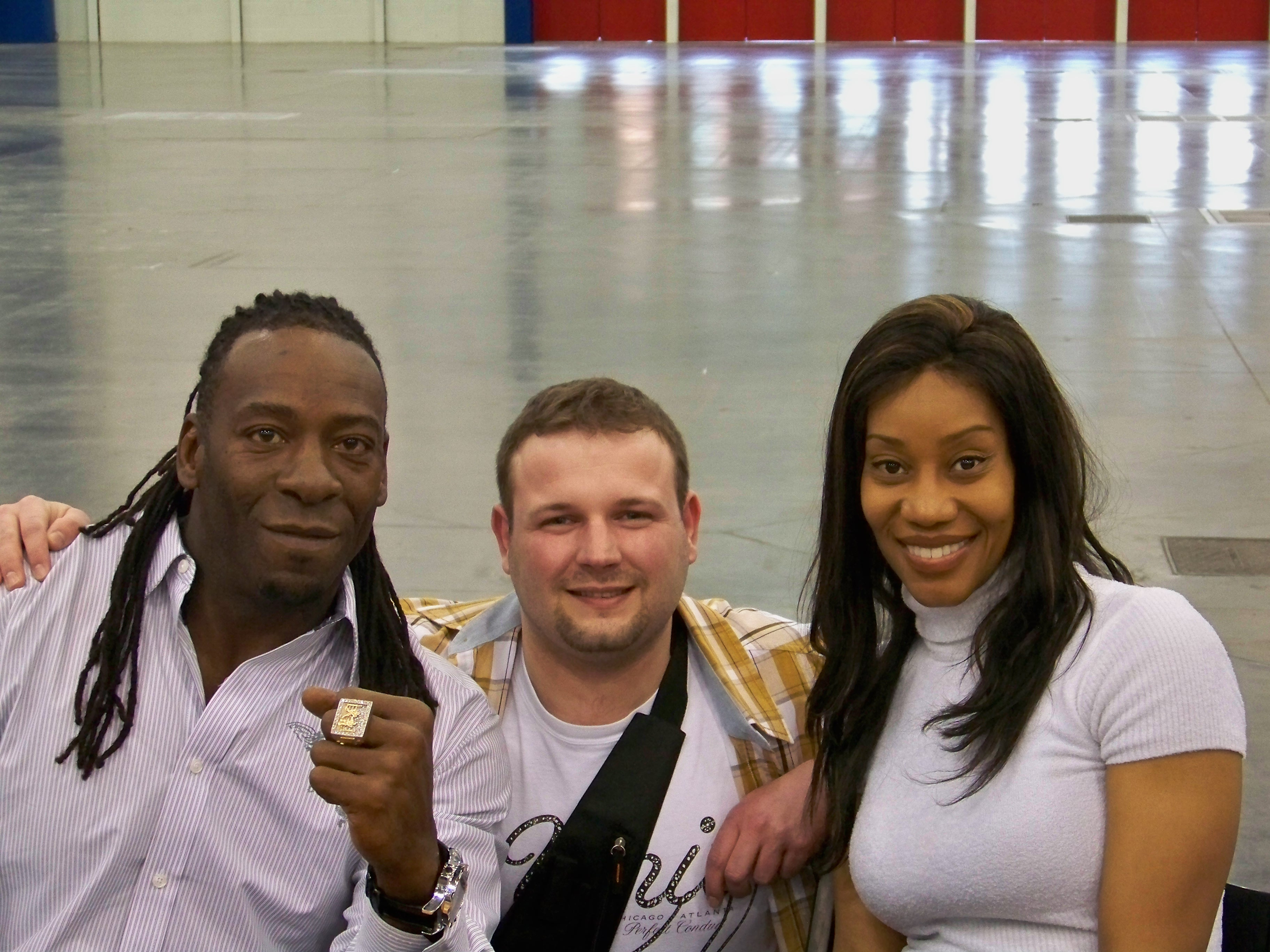
Booker T with his wife Sharmell in 2009

Huffman married his first wife Levestia on May 23, 1996. Booker presented her to the Nitro crowd the night after his WCW World Heavyweight Championship win at Bash at the Beach. Levestia was also used to further the feud between him and Jeff Jarrett when Jarrett hit her in the head with a guitar on Nitro on July 31, 2000. However, they divorced on May 8, 2001.

Huffman has a son, from a previous relationship with a high school girlfriend, named Brandon (born in 1982), with whom he has a strained relationship due to his time spent on the road. Booker married his girlfriend of five years, Sharmell Sullivan, in February 2005. The couple welcomed their twins, a boy named Kendrick and a girl named Kennedy, in 2010. Huffman and his brother Lash opened a wrestling school in Houston in 2005. He is also a fan of Formula One, and was in attendance at the 2012 U.S. Grand Prix as a guest of Lewis Hamilton.

=== Reality of Wrestling ===
In 2005, Huffman started his own wrestling promotion in Houston, Texas, called Pro Wrestling Alliance. In 2012, the promotion rebranded to Reality of Wrestling. After his final 2013 event, Christmas Chaos, ROW was near closing, but Houston business man Hilton Koch, who assisted the event, became a partner with Booker.

On February 21, 2015, Booker T and Stevie Ray reunited as Harlem Heat for one last match in Reality of Wrestling for the promotion's "The Final Heat" event. They defeated the Heavenly Bodies to win the ROW Tag Team Championship. On March 14, the titles were vacated.

In February 2020, Booker T returned to wrestle for the promotion in an eight-man tag team match.

=== Politics ===
On December 10, 2016, Huffman announced that he would be running in the 2019 Houston mayoral election. He was quoted saying that, "2020 is going to be a new era in the city of Houston. We're going to be looked at now from a different perspective. The cool city, 2020 is coming." Huffman was quoted in 2016, stating his focus for the three years leading up to the 2019 election would be concentrated on the city's "homeless, underprivileged, and low income areas." However, in September 2019, Huffman was not among the 12 names listed who applied for the election ballot.

=== Legal issues ===
At age 22, Huffman spent nineteen months in prison after pleading guilty to armed robberies at Wendy's restaurants in Houston. He and his partners wore Wendy's uniforms during the holdups since they had been working there for 2½ years. Because of the gunmen's uniforms and familiarity with the fast food chain's operations, police suspected the robberies were inside jobs—and it did not take long before Huffman and three other men were found. He pled guilty in December 1987 to two aggravated robbery counts and was sentenced to five years in prison. Huffman was released after serving 19 months, and was placed on parole until April 1992.

== Championships and accomplishments ==
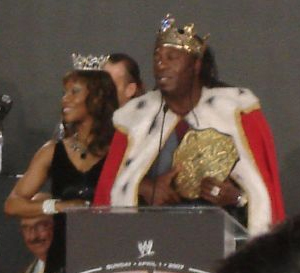
King Booker as World Heavyweight Champion, with his wife Queen Sharmell

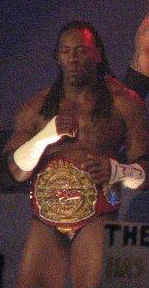
Booker T as TNA Legends Champion

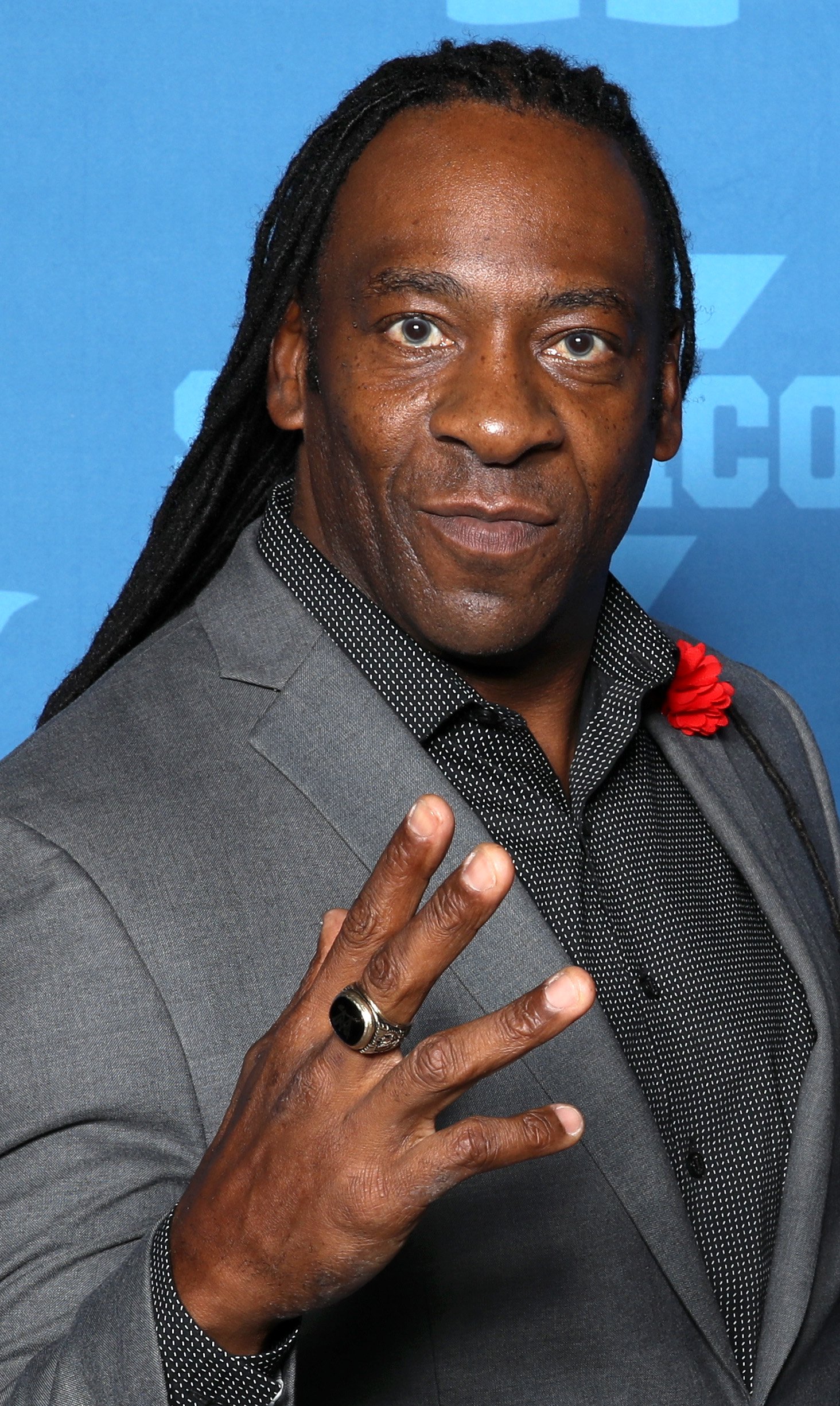
Booker T was inducted twice in the WWE Hall of Fame, individually in 2013 and as part of Harlem Heat in 2019. Pictured in 2018 with his first Hall of Fame ring.

- Cauliflower Alley Club
  - Tag Team Award (2018) – with Stevie Ray
- George Tragos/Lou Thesz Professional Wrestling Hall of Fame
  - Class of 2018
- Global Wrestling Federation
  - GWF Tag Team Championship (3 times) – with Stevie Ray
- Las Vegas Pro Wrestling
  - LVPW UWF Heavyweight Championship (1 time)
- Prairie Wrestling Alliance
  - PWA Heavyweight Championship (1 time)
- Pro Wrestling Illustrated
  - Inspirational Wrestler of the Year (2000)
  - Most Improved Wrestler of the Year (1998)
  - Tag Team of the Year (1995, 1996) with Stevie Ray
  - Stanley Weston Award (2024)
  - Ranked No. 5 of the top 500 wrestlers in the PWI 500 in 2001
- Southern Championship Wrestling Florida
  - SCW Florida Southern Heavyweight Championship (1 time)
- Texas All-Pro Wrestling
  - TAP Heavyweight Championship (1 time)
- Reality of Wrestling
  - ROW Tag Team Championship (1 time) – with Stevie Ray
- Total Nonstop Action Wrestling
  - TNA Legends Championship (1 time, inaugural)
  - TNA World Tag Team Championship (1 time) – with Scott Steiner
  - TNA Year End Awards (2 times)
    - Memorable Moment of the Year (2007)
    - Who To Watch in 2008 (2007)
- World Championship Wrestling
  - WCW World Heavyweight Championship (4 times)
  - WCW World Television Championship (6 times)
  - WCW United States Heavyweight Championship (1 time)
  - WCW World Tag Team Championship (11 times) – with Stevie Ray (10) with Test (1)
  - Ninth WCW Triple Crown Champion
- World Wrestling Federation/World Wrestling Entertainment/WWE
  - World Heavyweight Championship (1 time)
  - WCW Championship (1 time) (Note: Booker T's fifth WCW World Heavyweight Championship win overall and first under the WWF banner, where it was known as the WCW Championship.)
  - WWE Intercontinental Championship (1 time)
  - WWE United States Championship (3 times)
  - WWF Hardcore Championship (2 times)
  - World Tag Team Championship (3 times) – with Test (1), Goldust (1) and Rob Van Dam (1)
  - King of the Ring (2006)
  - Sixteenth Triple Crown Champion
  - Eighth Grand Slam Champion (under original format)
  - WWE Hall of Fame (2 times)
    - Class of 2013 – individually
    - Class of 2019 – as a member of Harlem Heat
- Wrestling Observer Newsletter
  - Most Underrated (2002)
  - Worst Television Announcer (2017, 2023, 2024, 2025)
