= Fontaine (band) =

Canadian folk-rock musical group

Fontaine (Formerly known as Indian City)
- Also known as: Indian City
- Origin: Winnipeg, Manitoba, Canada
- Genres: Folk rock; Indigenous rock
- Years active: 2012–present
- Labels: Rising Sun, Warner Music Canada, Atomic Ranch Records
- Spinoff of: Eagle & Hawk
- Members: Gabrielle Fontaine; Jay Bodner; Rich Reid; Julia Davis; Dave Sikorski
- Past members: Vince Fontaine; Don Amero; Neewa Mason; Pamela Davis; Karen Barg; Jeremy Koz; Gerry Atwell; Marty Chapman; Steve Martens; Buffy Handel; Tik Mason; William Prince; Ray Stevenson
- Website: indiancity.ca

Fontaine (formerly known as Indian City) is an Indigenous-led Canadian folk-rock musical group from Winnipeg, Manitoba. The group was founded in 2012 by Indigenous musician Vince Fontaine and is now led by his daughter, Gabrielle Fontaine. The band blends folk, pop, and roots with Indigenous storytelling and contemporary themes.

The group originally performed under the name Indian City and released four studio albums under that name, including the Juno Award-nominated albums Here & Now (2017) and Code Red (2021). Following Vince Fontaine's death in 2022, the group continued under the leadership of Gabrielle Fontaine, releasing Tomorrow (2024) and Ghosts (2025).

The group originally performed under the name Indian City and released four studio albums under that name, including the Juno Award-nominated albums Here & Now (2017) and Code Red (2021). Following Vince Fontaine's death in 2022, the group continued under the leadership of Gabrielle Fontaine, under their new name Fontaine.

== History ==
=== Formation and Indian City ===
FONTAINE was founded in Winnipeg in 2012 by Indigenous musician and songwriter Vince Fontaine, who was also the founder and leader of the Juno Award-winning Indigenous rock group Eagle & Hawk. The project brought together Indigenous and non-Indigenous musicians to create a collaborative musical collective centred on Indigenous perspectives, contemporary life and reconciliation.

The band's debut album, Supernation, was released in 2012, followed by Colors in 2013. Over the following years, the group developed a rotating collective of musicians and collaborators.

The band's third album, Here & Now, was released in 2017. The album received a Juno Award nomination for Indigenous Music Album of the Year at the 2018 Juno Awards. The album also received numerous Indigenous music awards and nominations.

The band's fourth album, Code Red, was released in 2021. The album included collaborations with artists including Jim Cuddy, Chantal Kreviazuk and Don Amero and explored themes connected to Indigenous values, reconciliation and community. Following its re-release by Warner Music Canada in 2022, Code Red received a Juno Award nomination for Contemporary Indigenous Group of the Year.

Vince Fontaine died suddenly in January 2022. Following his death, the group continued performing and recording with the support of his family and longtime collaborators. His daughter, Gabrielle Fontaine, subsequently assumed leadership of the group.

=== Fontaine era ===
Under Gabrielle Fontaine's leadership, the band continued Vince Fontaine's vision while developing its own contemporary sound and identity. The group released the album Tomorrow in 2024, followed by Ghosts in 2025.

The band's recordings during this period included collaborations with artists such as Julian Taylor, Kelly Bado, Goody Grace, Tom Wilson (musician), Ariel Posen and Don Amero.

In 2026, the group changed its name from Indian City to FONTAINE. The name reflects the band's connection to the Fontaine family and the legacy established by its founder while representing a new generation of the group.

Under the FONTAINE name, the group continues as an Indigenous-led collaborative band combining Indigenous and non-Indigenous musicians. The group's music continues to explore Indigenous identity, contemporary life, resilience, community and reconciliation.

In June 2026, the band performed at the FIFA Fan Festival Vancouver at Hastings Park during the FIFA World Cup 2026. The performance was part of the festival's live music programming, which featured Canadian, Indigenous and international artists. The official FIFA Fan Festival programming listed Indian City for June 21, 2026, reflecting the band's name at the time of the performance.

=== Discography ===
==== Supernation (2012) ====
The band's debut album Supernation was released in August 2012, accompanied by a concert in Winnipeg, Manitoba. Supernation won Best Pop Album, and Amero won Male Entertainer of the Year for both his work with Indian City and his solo album Heart on My Sleeve, at that year's Aboriginal Peoples Choice Music Awards.

==== Colors (2013) ====
They followed up with a second album, Colors, in 2013. In 2015, Indian City released a single, "One Day", which reaches out to those having thoughts of suicide.

==== Here & Now (2017) ====
Here & Now, their third album, was released on 15 February 2017. The song, "Through the Flood", won Best Music video performance from the Native American Music Awards (NAMALIVE). Three of the songs from the album won the Indian Summer Music Awards in 2017: "Tree of Life" as Best Country; "Seasons" as Best Pop; and "Here & Now" as Best Rock. The album was nominated for the 2018 Indigenous Music Album of the Year for the Juno Awards. One of the songs on this album, "Through the Flood", features Don Amero and directly addresses the issues of missing and murdered Indigenous women and girls in Canada. In 2018, the band performed at a concert to raise awareness of the issue.

==== Code Red (2021) ====
Code Red, their fourth album, was released during the fall of 2021. This album featured guest artists Jim Cuddy, Chantal Kreviazuk, and Don Amero. However, in January 2022 their band leader, Vince Fontaine, died from a sudden heart attack. The band decided to continue with Code Red, and the album was re-released by Warner Music Canada on 30 September 2022, the National Day for Truth and Reconciliation. Code Red was nominated for Contemporary Indigenous Artist of the Year at the 2022 Juno Awards.

==== Tomorrow (2024) ====
Following Vinces passing in 2022, the group released a new album Tomorrow on National Indigenous Peoples Day 2024. The album features guest artists Julian Taylor, Kelly Bado, and Goody Grace. The album finished with "Sunrise Song", one of the last songs written by Vince Fontaine. The album received a nomination for Indigenous Songwriter of the Year at the Canadian Folk Music Awards. And nominations for Best Pop, Best Americana, and Best Music Video with the Native American Music Awards, winning Best Americana Recording for Good People (feat. Julian Taylor and Kelly Bado).

==== Ghosts (2025) ====
In 2025, Indian City released Ghosts, an album exploring themes of memory, loss, resilience and the lasting connections between people and community. The album featured collaborations with Canadian musicians including Tom Wilson (musician) and Ariel Posen. The album also included the single Mother, featuring Don Amero. The song was based on unfinished material written by Vince Fontaine and was completed by his daughter Gabrielle. Ghosts continued the band's blend of folk, pop and rock while reflecting on contemporary Indigenous experiences and personal stories.

== See also ==
- Indigenous music of Canada
