= Raquel Cole =

Canadian country singer-songwriter (born 1993)

- Born: Raquel Warchol; March 22, 1993 (age 33)
- Origin: Vernon, British Columbia, Canada
- Genres: Country; country pop
- Occupation: Singer-songwriter
- Instruments: Vocals, guitar, mandolin
- Years active: 2013-present
- Labels: Sakamoto; RHW
- Website: Official website

Raquel Warchol, known professionally as Raquel Cole (born March 22, 1993) is a Canadian country singer and songwriter. As an independent artist, she released two extended plays, Personal Truth and The Essence of Me. Outside of her solo career, she is also part of the Nashville-based independent music trio The Woods.

== Early life ==
Cole grew up in Vernon, British Columbia and began playing the guitar when she was nine years old. Her parents purchased her the guitar as her father was a drummer and wanted someone to play music with. Her father arranged for her to have her first experience in a recording studio at ten years old as he wanted her to have an understanding of the recording process. At twelve years old, she won the "Best New Artist of the Year" at the B.C. Interior Music Awards. Cole credits the music scene in Vernon for inspiring her to be a songwriter and guitar player. She initially was more interested in the soft pop genre of music and was a large fan of Celine Dion growing up, but later became more interested in country music as she began to write songs, citing Keith Urban and Lady A as artists she listened to.

== Career ==
In 2014, Cole was named one of SiriusXM's "Fresh Female Voices" on The Highway. She opened on nine tour dates that fall for Diamond Rio in the southern United States. In 2015, she was named the Discovery Artist by the Canadian Country Music Association. She released her debut extended play Personal Truth in 2018, having recorded the songs in Winnipeg, Manitoba. Her song "Imogene" finished in second place of the Unsigned Only category of the International Songwriting Competition. She released a three-song extended play The Essence of Me in August 2020, after recording this project in Nashville, Tennessee. She received a nomination for "Female Artist of the Year" at the 2020 British Columbia Country Music Awards.

In 2021, Cole was a finalist at the SiriusXM Top of the Country competition. She released her first country radio single "Think About You" in July 2021. The song would enter the Billboard Canada Country chart and peak at number 44. In March 2022, she featured on fellow Canadian country singer Don Amero's single "Let You", which reached the top 30 at Canadian country radio. In October 2022, Cole signed a record deal with Sakamoto Music and released her second country radio single, "Hate That I Need You". Later that month, she opened for The Washboard Union on several of their tour dates in British Columbia. In July 2023, Cole released the song "All to Yourself". At the 2023 BC Country Music Awards, she won the International Achievement Award.

== Discography ==
=== Extended plays ===
| Title | Details |
|---|---|
| Personal Truth | Released: June 1, 2018; Label: RHW Music; Format: Digital download, streaming |
| The Essence of Me | Released: August 14, 2020; Label: RHW Music; Format: Digital download, streaming |
| Fire Child | Released: October 10, 2025; Label: RHW Music; Format: Digital download, streaming |

=== Singles ===
==== As lead artist ====
| Year | Single | Peak chart positions | Album |
| Year | Single | CAN Country | Album |
|---|---|---|---|
| 2021 | "Think About You" | 44 | Non-album singles |
| 2022 | "Hate That I Need You" | — | Non-album singles |
"—" denotes releases that did not chart.

==== Guest singles ====
| Year | Single | Artist | Peak positions | Album |
| Year | Single | Artist | CAN Country | Album |
|---|---|---|---|---|
| 2022 | "Let You" | Don Amero | 28 | Nothing is Meaningless |

=== Music videos ===
| Year | Video | Director |
|---|---|---|
| 2021 | "Think About You" | Zack Knudson |
| 2022 | "Let You" (with Don Amero) | Ryan Nolan |
| 2022 | "Hate That I Need You" | Zack Knudson |
