= Don Amero =

Canadian music artist (born 1980)

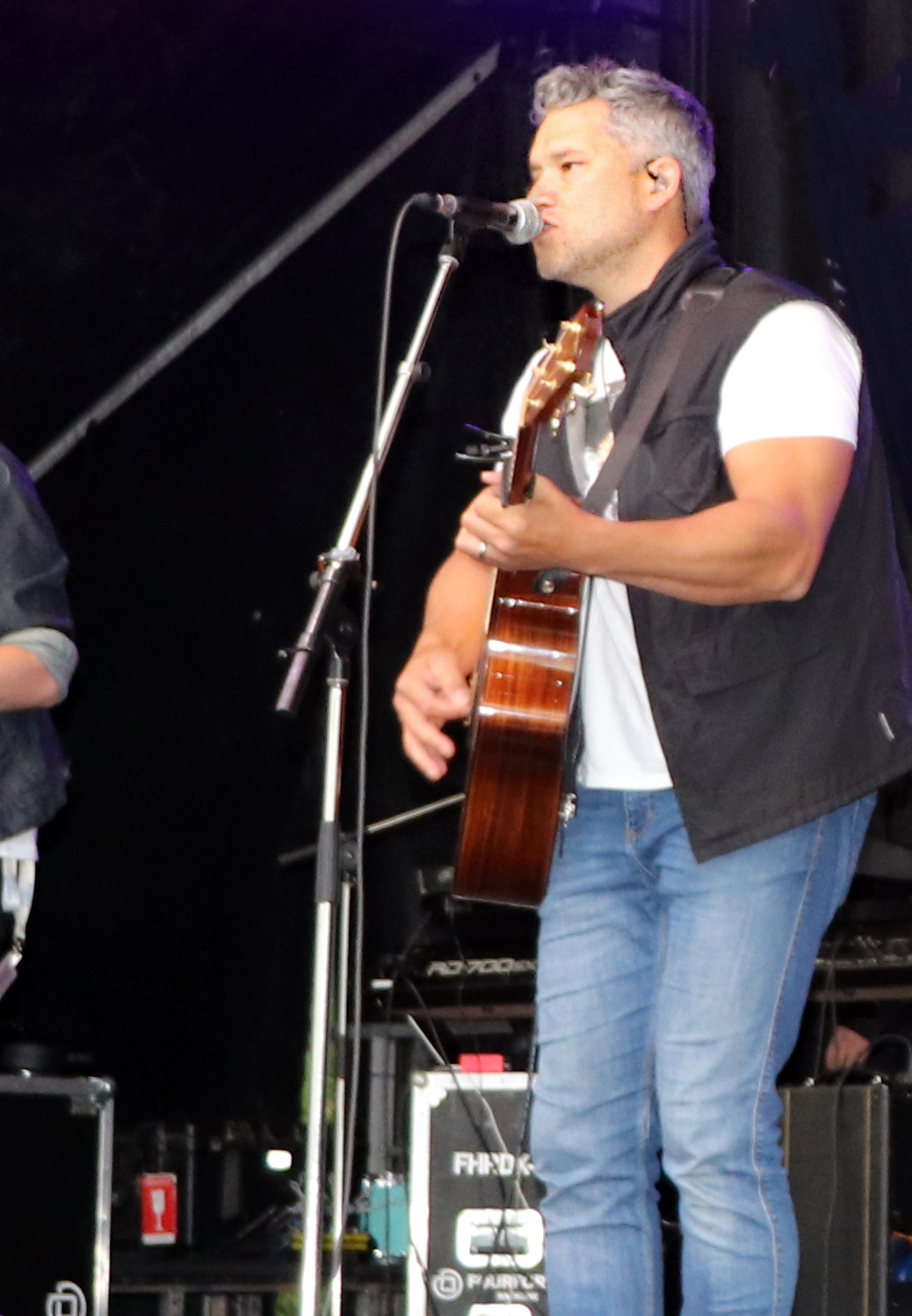
- Amero in 2022

Background information
- Born: September 11, 1980 (age 46); Winnipeg, Manitoba, Canada
- Genres: country, folk
- Years active: 2007-present
- Label: MDM Recordings
- Member of: Indian City
- Website: Official website

Donald Amero (born September 11, 1980) is a Canadian country and folk singer-songwriter from Winnipeg, Manitoba.

Prior to launching his career as a musician, Amero worked as a hardwood flooring installer, and unsuccessfully tried out for Canadian Idol in 2006. He released his debut CD Change Your Life in 2006, and left his flooring job in 2007. The album garnered five Aboriginal Peoples Choice Music Award nominations, for best new artist, songwriter, folk or acoustic CD, album cover and producer/engineer.

His second album, Deepening, followed in 2009. The album again garnered several Aboriginal Peoples Choice nominations, and Amero won the Canadian Folk Music Award for Aboriginal Songwriter of the Year. In 2010, he performed on the bill for APTN's Aboriginal Day Live concert, and released his third album The Long Way Home. The album won the awards for Best Folk Recording at the 2011 Native American Music Awards, and for Best Aboriginal Recording at the Western Canadian Music Awards.

In 2012, he performed at a fundraising benefit concert for indigenous music pioneer Shingoose, and released his fourth album Heart on My Sleeve. He also collaborated with Vince Fontaine of Eagle & Hawk in Indian City, a band whose album Supernation fused traditional First Nations music with experimental rock. Amero won Male Entertainer of the Year, and Supernation won Best Pop Album, at that year's Aboriginal Peoples Choice Music Awards. Heart on My Sleeve garnered Amero his first Juno Award nomination for Aboriginal Album of the Year at the Juno Awards of 2013, won the award for Best Folk/Acoustic Album at the 2013 Aboriginal Peoples Choice Music Awards, and was nominated for a Canadian Folk Music Award.

His fifth album, Refined, was released in 2015. In the same year, he collaborated with country singer Brett Kissel on "Rebuild This Town", a song about cultural reconciliation between Indigenous peoples and other Canadians.

At the Juno Awards of 2016, Refined garnered Juno Award nominations for Aboriginal Album of the Year and Adult Contemporary Album of the Year.

In August 2018, Amero released his sixth album, Evolution, which launched him into the country music genre. In 2019, Amero released the single "Music Lover" to Canadian country radio.

In September 2020, Amero released his extended play The Next Chapter.

== Discography ==
- Change Your Life (2006)
- Deepening (2009)
- The Long Way Home (2010)
- Heart on My Sleeve (2012)
- Refined (2015)
- Evolution (2018)
- Amero Little Christmas (2019)
- The Next Chapter (2020)
- Nothing Is Meaningless (2021)
- Six (2023)

=== Singles ===
Year	Single	Peak positions	Album
Year	Single	CAN Country	Album
2019	"Music Lover"	45	The Next Chapter
2020	"Morning Coffee"	—	The Next Chapter
2020	"Wouldn't Be Home"	—	The Next Chapter
2020	"Wasn’t the Dress"	48	The Next Chapter
2021	"You Can't Always Be 21"	—	Nothing Is Meaningless
2021	"My Poor Mama"	46	Nothing Is Meaningless
2022	"Let You" (feat. Raquel Cole)	28	Nothing Is Meaningless
2022	"Ain't Too Late"	—	Six
2023	"Go Girl"	—	Six
2023	"Wheels Off"	—	Six
2024	"Can't Fix This"	—	Six

== Awards and nominations ==
Year	Association	Category	Nominated work	Result	Ref
2022	Canadian Country Music Association	Album of the Year	Nothing is Meaningless	Nominated	
2023	Canadian Country Music Association	Innovative Campaign of the Year	"Let 'Em Lie" Release Highlights (with Kyle McKearney)	Nominated	
