= WWE Radio =

- Frequency: SiriusXM 93

Programming
- Format: Professional wrestling

Ownership
- Owner: SiriusXM (branding licensed from WWE)

Technical information
- Class: Satellite radio channel

Links
- Website: SiriusXM: WWE Radio

WWE Radio is a satellite radio channel devoted to professional wrestling operated by SiriusXM in partnership with WWE.

The channel launched as a general combat sports channel, Fight Nation, and in March 2023 was announced as carrying audio simulcasts of select UFC events.

On July 1, 2025, SiriusXM relaunched the channel as Pro Wrestling Nation 24/7, built around the existing talk show Busted Open, hosted by Dave LaGreca and a rotation of pro wrestlers including Bully Ray, Mark Henry, and Tommy Dreamer. The channel's boxing show moved to Faction Talk, and mixed martial arts coverage was dropped entirely.

Barely one year later, on July 27, 2026, the channel began a partnership with WWE and adopted its current name, adding broadcasts of WWE's in-house podcasts, and live coverage of WWE premium live events beginning with SummerSlam 2026, with Vic Joseph as the play-by-play commentator and Booker T as the color commentator. As part of the transition, Thunder Rosa, who is contracted to All Elite Wrestling (AEW), left the co-host rotation of Busted Open, which some observers noted had already all but eliminated coverage of AEW programming.

Radio WWF logo

The relaunched channel serves as a spiritual successor to Radio WWF, a syndicated radio program hosted by Jim Ross, Johnny Polo, and Gorilla Monsoon that ran from 1993 to 1994. It featured shows that would cover ongoing WWF storylines and behind the scenes incidents and also provided commentary for two pay-per-views that year, SummerSlam and Survivor Series before going off air right after the 1994 Royal Rumble.
