= Off the Record with Michael Landsberg =

Canadian TV series, 1997–2015

- Also known as: Off the Record
- Genre: Talk show
- Starring: Michael Landsberg
- Country of origin: Canada

Production
- Production locations: 9 Channel Nine Court; Scarborough, Toronto, Ontario
- Running time: 30 minutes

Original release
- Network: TSN
- Release: September 8, 1997 – December 18, 2015

Off the Record with Michael Landsberg, also known as Off the Record or OTR, was a Canadian sports talk show that was hosted by Michael Landsberg. The program aired on TSN from September 8, 1997 to December 18, 2015, making it one of the longest-running sports talk shows on Canadian television.

== History ==
The half-hour show featured guests from various backgrounds, ranging from sports athletes to reporters to political figures or even entertainers, participating as panelists in a round table discussion on notable sports events of the day, with Landsberg serving as the moderator. Occasionally, an episode would feature just one guest in a one-on-one interview with Landsberg, usually from the sports world or WWE personalities. Prior to the second commercial break of the show, a portion of the commercial bumper included a "Quirky Fact" shown on the screen related either to the major sports topic of the day, or in relation to the guest being interviewed by Landsberg. Prior to the third commercial break, a portion of the bumper included Landsberg reading a witty email to the show from a viewer, often in the form of quips directed towards him. However, when there was a one-on-one interview that Landsberg was conducting with someone that was dealing with an issue of seriousness or solemness, this segment would be omitted.

During its initial years, Landsberg would always preface before the discussion with his guest panel or one-on-one guest interview that whatever opinions were stated by his guests on the program would be off the record and could therefore not be used against them. This practice, however, eventually disappeared in later seasons.

In later years, the guest panel segment was sandwiched between the opening "Up Front" segment (where Landsberg would ask a guest one-on-one questions in relation to a sports issue of the day) and the closing "Next Question" segment (where Landsberg would rattle off a series of one-on-one questions that relates to the guest's interests and background).

Clips of Off The Record were featured in the 1998 documentary film Hitman Hart: Wrestling with Shadows.

One of the show's most noted moments occurred in an episode in which Gene Simmons, Thea Andrews and Mark Tewksbury were guests. During the episode, Simmons told Andrews he had slept with 4,500 women, to which Andrews replied she wasn't interested in being 4,501. Tewksbury, in response, offered himself to Simmons instead, to which Simmons declined. Tewksbury would state in a 2012 interview with the National Post that Simmons shook his head at Tewksbury off-camera.

On November 17, 2015, The Globe and Mail (amongst other outlets) reported that Off The Record would be ending its 18-year run as a standalone program. Landsberg remained employed at TSN to produce shorter segments, but many of the show's staff were let go.

On September 10, 2018, Landsberg launched a new radio show with former Toronto Maple Leaf player Carlo Colaiacovo, titled First Up with Landsberg and Colaiacovo, airing weekdays from 6 - 10 a.m. ET on TSN 1050.
