= Vic Joseph =

American professional wrestling commentator (born 1985)

Personal information
- Born: Victor Travagliante; July 8, 1985 (age 41) Cleveland, Ohio, U.S.
- Spouse: McKenzie Mitchell (m. 2022)

Professional wrestling career
- Ring name(s): Vic Joseph; Vic Travagliante
- Billed from: Cleveland, Ohio
- Debut: 2012

Victor Travagliante (born July 8, 1985) is an American professional wrestling commentator. He is signed to WWE, where he works under the ring name Vic Joseph, and serves as the play-by-play commentator on NXT and color commentator on Main Event and play-by-play commentator on WWE LFG and premium live events for WWE Radio.

== Career ==
=== Early years ===
Travagliante grew up in Richfield, Ohio and attended Revere High School. After college he began his broadcasting career signing with CBS and working with an affiliate Cleveland radio station WKRK-FM 92.3 as a sports anchor and reporter. During his time Travagliante covered multiple NBA Finals, the 2016 World Series, NCAA Tournaments and was a reporter on the Cleveland Browns Network. Travagliante interviewed athletes such as LeBron James, Mike Trout, Johnny Manziel and Kobe Bryant. While at WKRK, he started in the wrestling business on the side, serving as a commentator and ring announcer for independent promotions such as Prime Wrestling (PWO), Absolute Intense Wrestling (AIW) and House of Hardcore (HOH).

=== WWE (2017–present) ===
In January 2017, it was announced that Travagliante, under the new ring name Vic Joseph, signed with the WWE. Travagliante would join the commentary team of Main Event beginning on May 24, 2017, replacing Tom Phillips. On June 13, 2017, Joseph announced that he joins as play-by-play commentator for 205 Live, while still also participating on Main Event. On October 17, 2018, Joseph debuted as a play-by-play commentator on NXT UK, alongside Nigel McGuinness and also on 205 Live the next day.

On August 19, 2019, Joseph appeared as a guest commentator on Raw, as part of a commentary team filling in for Corey Graves and Jerry Lawler.

On September 30, 2019, Joseph announced that he is the new play-by-play commentator role on Raw, replacing Michael Cole where he was moved back to Friday Night SmackDown on Fox.

On January 27, 2020, Joseph left the announce team on Raw and was replaced on play-by-play commentary by Tom Phillips, along with his former SmackDown Live commentary team member Byron Saxton. On July 17, 2020, Joseph made his return to the 205 Live broadcast team alongside Drew Gulak to replace Byron Saxton. On August 12, 2020, Joseph joined the NXT commentary team as lead announcer.

On the October 10, 2023 edition of WWE NXT, Joseph’s father died. Despite the personal tragedy Joseph still sat ringside and performed, later noting it was what his late father would have wanted and not wanting to let down the fans.

On February 14, 2025 edition of SmackDown, Joseph filled in for regular commentator Joe Tessitore, who was calling boxing. Joseph has also called matches on all Premium Live Events including WrestleMania.

Since 2026, Joseph has provided alternative commentary alongside Booker T on SiriusXM’s WWE Radio channel for pay-per-view events.

== Personal life ==
Travagliante married interviewer McKenzie Mitchell on September 30, 2022.

Preceded by Tom Phillips	205 Live lead announcer 2017–2019	Succeeded by Tom Phillips
Preceded by Inaugural	NXT UK lead announcer 2018–2019	Succeeded by Tom Phillips
Preceded by Michael Cole	Raw lead announcer 2019–2020	Succeeded by Tom Phillips
Preceded by Mauro Ranallo	NXT lead announcer 2020–present	Succeeded by current
Preceded by Byron Saxton	205 Live lead announcer 2020–2021	Succeeded by Tom Phillips
Preceded by Tom Phillips	205 Live lead announcer 2021–2022	Succeeded by Sudu Shah
