= Derek King =

Canadian ice hockey player and coach

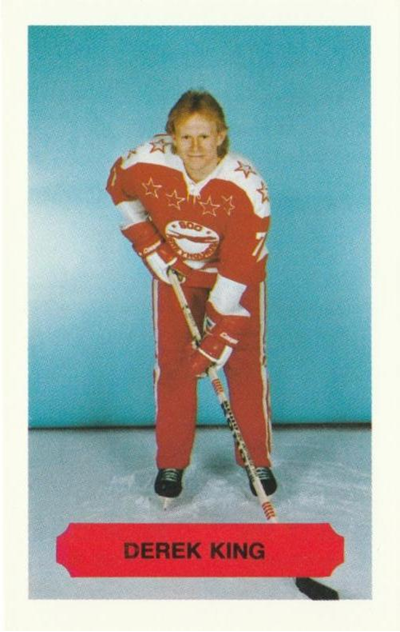
- King for Sault Ste. Marie Greyhounds in 1984
- Born: February 11, 1967 (age 59) Hamilton, Ontario, Canada
- Height: 6 ft 1 in (185 cm)
- Weight: 205 lb (93 kg; 14 st 9 lb)
- Position: Left wing
- Shot: Left
- Played for: New York Islanders; Hartford Whalers; Toronto Maple Leafs; St. Louis Blues; Munich Barons
- Current AHL coach: Hershey Bears
- Coached for: Chicago Blackhawks
- National team: Canada
- NHL draft: 13th overall, 1985; New York Islanders
- Playing career: 1986–2000
- Coaching career: 2009–present

Derek King (born February 11, 1967) is a Canadian former professional ice hockey left winger and current head coach for the Hershey Bears of the American Hockey League. He most recently served as an assistant coach for the Chicago Blackhawks of the National Hockey League. King played 14 seasons in the National Hockey League from 1986–87 until 1999–2000.

== Playing career ==
King was drafted 13th overall by the New York Islanders in the 1985 NHL entry draft. He played 830 career NHL games, scoring 261 goals and 351 assists for 612 points. He was a three-time 30-goal scorer, including one 40-goal season. He scored the last Maple Leafs goal in Maple Leaf Gardens in 1999.

== Coaching career ==
On August 21, 2009, King was named the assistant coach of the Toronto Maple Leafs AHL affiliate the Toronto Marlies. In 2014, he was promoted to associate coach.

On July 28, 2015, King was named assistant coach of the Owen Sound Attack of the Ontario Hockey League. However, he left the Attack on October 28, 2015.

On July 7, 2016, King was named an assistant coach with the Rockford IceHogs of the American Hockey League, the minor league affiliate of the Chicago Blackhawks. On November 6, 2018, King was named the interim head coach of the IceHogs when head coach Jeremy Colliton was promoted to the Blackhawks. King was named the permanent head coach of the IceHogs at the end of the 2018–19 season.

On November 6, 2021, King was named interim head coach of the Chicago Blackhawks of the National Hockey League to replace the dismissed Colliton, who led the team to a 1–9–2 start to the 2021–22 season.

On November 7, 2021 King earned his first win as an NHL head coach as the Chicago Blackhawks defeated the Nashville Predators by a score of 2–1 in overtime in his head coaching debut.

On June 27, 2022, King was replaced as head coach of the Blackhawks by former Montreal Canadiens assistant and longtime NHL defenseman Luke Richardson, but rehired 14 days later as an assistant coach.

On August 4, 2025 the Hershey Bears announced King as the 29th head coach in franchise history, replacing Todd Nelson who left the organization after winning two Calder Cup titles in his 3 year tenure.

== Career statistics ==
=== Regular season and playoffs ===
			Regular season					Playoffs
Season	Team	League	GP	G	A	Pts	PIM	GP	G	A	Pts	PIM
1982–83	Hamilton Mountain A's	OPJHL	8	1	2	3	0	—	—	—	—	—
1983–84	Hamilton Mountain A's	OPJHL	37	10	14	24	142	—	—	—	—	—
1984–85	Sault Ste. Marie Greyhounds	OHL	63	35	38	73	106	16	3	13	16	11
1985–86	Sault Ste. Marie Greyhounds	OHL	25	12	17	29	33	—	—	—	—	—
1985–86	Oshawa Generals	OHL	19	8	13	21	15	6	3	2	5	13
1986–87	Oshawa Generals	OHL	57	53	53	106	74	17	14	10	24	40
1986–87	New York Islanders	NHL	2	0	0	0	0	—	—	—	—	—
1987–88	Springfield Indians	AHL	10	7	6	13	6	—	—	—	—	—
1987–88	New York Islanders	NHL	55	12	24	36	30	5	0	2	2	2
1988–89	Springfield Indians	AHL	4	4	0	4	0	—	—	—	—	—
1988–89	New York Islanders	NHL	60	14	29	43	14	—	—	—	—	—
1989–90	Springfield Indians	AHL	21	11	12	23	33	—	—	—	—	—
1989–90	New York Islanders	NHL	46	13	27	40	20	4	0	0	0	4
1990–91	New York Islanders	NHL	66	19	26	45	44	—	—	—	—	—
1991–92	New York Islanders	NHL	80	40	38	78	46	—	—	—	—	—
1992–93	New York Islanders	NHL	77	38	38	76	47	18	3	11	14	14
1993–94	New York Islanders	NHL	78	30	40	70	59	4	0	1	1	0
1994–95	New York Islanders	NHL	43	10	16	26	41	—	—	—	—	—
1995–96	New York Islanders	NHL	61	12	20	32	23	—	—	—	—	—
1996–97	New York Islanders	NHL	70	23	30	53	20	—	—	—	—	—
1996–97	Hartford Whalers	NHL	12	3	3	6	2	—	—	—	—	—
1997–98	Toronto Maple Leafs	NHL	77	21	25	46	43	—	—	—	—	—
1998–99	Toronto Maple Leafs	NHL	81	24	28	52	20	16	1	3	4	4
1999–2000	Toronto Maple Leafs	NHL	3	0	0	0	2	—	—	—	—	—
1999–2000	St. Louis Blues	NHL	19	2	7	9	6	—	—	—	—	—
1999–2000	Grand Rapids Griffins	IHL	52	19	30	49	25	17	7	8	15	8
2000–01	Grand Rapids Griffins	IHL	76	32	51	83	19	10	5	5	10	4
2001–02	München Barons	DEL	60	19	26	45	22	9	2	4	6	4
2002–03	Grand Rapids Griffins	AHL	59	13	28	41	20	15	4	10	14	6
2003–04	Grand Rapids Griffins	AHL	77	9	21	30	19	4	0	2	2	0
NHL totals			830	261	351	612	417	47	4	17	21	24

=== International ===
Year	Team	Event	GP	G	A	Pts	PIM
1992	Canada	WC	6	1	1	2	6

== NHL head coaching record ==
Team	Year	Regular season						Postseason			
Team	Year	G	W	L	OTL	Pts	Finish	W	L	Win%	Result
CHI	2021–22	70	27	33	10	(64)	7th in Central	—	—	—	Missed playoffs

Awards and achievements
Preceded by Brad Dalgarno	New York Islanders first-round draft pick 1985	Succeeded by Tom Fitzgerald
Sporting positions
Preceded by Jeremy Colliton	Head coach of the Chicago Blackhawks (interim); 2021–2022	Succeeded by Luke Richardson
