= Morning Coffee (Firefox extension) =

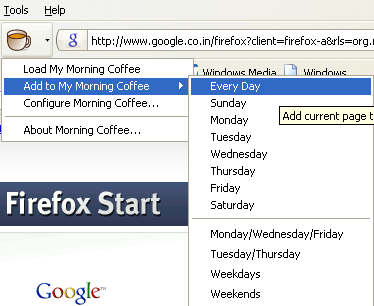
- Developer: Shane "SJML" Liesegang
- Final release: 1.38 / May 18, 2014; 12 years ago
- Type: Mozilla extension
- License: MPL
- Website: shaneliesegang.com/projects/coffee.php

Morning Coffee is a discontinued Firefox addon that assists its Firefox user in opening daily routine websites. Users can configure Morning Coffee with several presets, each of which consists of a collection of URLs. These presets are named after days of the week. Upon order, Morning Coffee can open all URLs within a certain preset in separate tabs. The same effect can be achieved by Firefox bookmarking system, and the ability to open multiple web pages as home pages. However, Morning Coffee can be configured to close all tabs before opening a preset, or randomize the order of the tabs. Morning Coffee's ability to open the correct daily preset instead of home pages remained in the experimental stage.

Morning Coffee is not compatible with Firefox 57 and later.

Replacement: addons.mozilla.org/en-US/firefox/addon/morning-coffee-quantum/
