= The Next Chapter (EP) =

EP by Don Amero
- Released: September 25, 2020
- Genre: Country
- Length: 20:31
- Label: MDM Recordings

Don Amero chronology
Amero Little Christmas (2019)	The Next Chapter (2020)	Nothing Is Meaningless (2021)

Singles from The Next Chapter
- 1. "Music Lover" Released: June 28, 2019; 2. "Morning Coffee" Released: January 17, 2020; 3. "Wouldn't Be Home" Released: May 1, 2020; 4. "Wasn't the Dress" Released: September 4, 2020

The Next Chapter is an extended play by Canadian country artist Don Amero. It was released on September 25, 2020 through MDM Recordings. It features the singles "Music Lover", "Morning Coffee", "Wouldn't Be Home", and "Wasn't the Dress".

== Track listing ==
Adapted from Spotify.
No.	Title	Writer(s)	Length
1.	"Wouldn't Be Home"	Preston Brust; Benjy Davis; Chris Lucas	2:50
2.	"Morning Coffee"	Andrew Albert; Sarah Emily Berrios; Connie Harrington	3:28
3.	"Wasn't the Dress"	Corey Crowder; Michael Hobbs; Jared Mullins	2:49
4.	"Music Lover"	Kelly Archer; Adam Hambrick; Joe Don Rooney	3:21
5.	"One That You Want Back"	Crowder; Josh Jerkins	3:05
6.	"Everybody Wants Something"	Rodney Clawson; Marv Green; Eric Paslay	3:17
7.	"On Down the Road"	Don Amero; Craig Monday	1:39
Total length:			20:31

== Charts ==
=== Singles ===
Year	Single	Peak chart positions
Year	Single	CAN Country
2019	"Music Lover"	45
2020	"Morning Coffee"	66
2020	"Wouldn't Be Home"	103
2020	"Wasn't the Dress"	48
"—" denotes releases that did not chart
