= Eagle & Hawk =

Canadian First Nations rock group

- Origin: Winnipeg, Manitoba, Canada
- Genres: Indigenous rock; roots rock
- Years active: 1994–present
- Label: Rising Sun
- Members: Jay Bodner; Neewa Mason; Lawrence "Spatch" Mulhall; Rich Reid
- Past members: Vince Fontaine; Troy Westwood
- Website: eagleandhawk.com

Eagle & Hawk is a Canadian First Nations rock group based in Winnipeg, Manitoba, active since 1994. They are most noted for winning the Juno Award for Best Music of Aboriginal Canada Recording in 2002 for their album On and On. The band had numerous members throughout its history, with guitarist Vince Fontaine as the primary and constant member.

== History ==
The band was formed in 1994 by Vince Fontaine and Troy Westwood. Their debut album The Dream was released in 1997. However, Westwood left the band that year as he was unable to balance the band's touring commitments against his work as a football player for the Winnipeg Blue Bombers. He was replaced by Jay Bodner, who remained the band's lead singer for the rest of its career, although Westwood remained an occasional guest collaborator.

Other musicians associated with the band have included keyboardists Gerry Atwell, Jaylene Johnson, Will Bonness, and Rena Semenko; bassists Randy Booth, Jeff Monkman, Clint Adams, Lawrence "Spatch" Mulhall, D.J. St. Germain, and Tik Mason; and drummers Mike Bruyere, Brent Fitz, Steve Broadhurst, Kevin Radomsky, Marty Chapman, and Rich Reid.

The band released 10 albums throughout its career.

In addition to their Juno Award win, the band won three awards, for best songwriter, best rock album for Mother Earth and best song for "Sundancer", at the Canadian Aboriginal Music Awards in 2004. The band garnered two further Juno Award nominations for Aboriginal Recording of the Year, in 2004 for Mother Earth and in 2006 for Life Is. They also won awards from the Western Canadian Music Awards, the Native American Music Awards, the Aboriginal Peoples Choice Music Awards, and the Indian Summer Music Awards.

In 2011, Fontaine collaborated with Don Amero, William Prince, Pamela Davis, and Neewa Mason in Indian City, a project whose 2012 album Supernation fused traditional aboriginal music with experimentally tinged folk rock. Amero won Male Entertainer of the Year, and Supernation won Best Pop Album, at that year's Aboriginal Peoples Choice Music Awards.

Although the band have not recorded a new album since 2010's The Great Unknown, they continued to perform occasional live dates, including a 2012 benefit concert for musician Shingoose following his stroke.

Fontaine died of a heart attack on January 11, 2022, at the age of 60. The death was announced by his niece, provincial MLA Nahanni Fontaine.

== Discography ==
- The Dream (1997)
- Indian City (1999)
- Eagle & Hawk (2000)
- On and On (2002)
- The Red (2003)
- Mother Earth (2004)
- Life Is... (2005)
- Red Road Stories (2007)
- Sirensong (2008)
- The Great Unknown (2010)
- 20 Years Best of (2018)
- Liberty (2019)
- Sundancer 21 (2020)
- Code Red (2021)

== See also ==
- Indigenous music of Canada
