= Brad Dalgarno =

Canadian ice hockey player (born 1967)

- Born: August 11, 1967 (age 58) Vancouver, British Columbia, Canada
- Height: 6 ft 3 in (191 cm)
- Weight: 215 lb (98 kg; 15 st 5 lb)
- Position: Right wing
- Shot: Right
- Played for: New York Islanders
- NHL draft: 6th overall, 1985; New York Islanders
- Playing career: 1986–1996

Bradley William Dalgarno (born August 11, 1967) is a Canadian former professional ice hockey right wing. He was drafted in the first round, sixth overall, by the New York Islanders of the National Hockey League (NHL) in the 1985 NHL entry draft.

Dalgarno played three seasons of junior hockey in the Ontario Hockey League with the Hamilton Steelhawks. He spent his entire professional career in the Islanders organization. In his NHL career, he appeared in 321 games. He scored 49 goals and added 71 assists. He appeared in 27 playoff games, scoring two goals and recording four assists.

== Career statistics ==
			Regular season					Playoffs
Season	Team	League	GP	G	A	Pts	PIM	GP	G	A	Pts	PIM
1983–84	Markham Waxers	OJHL	40	17	11	28	59	—	—	—	—	—
1983–84	Orillia Travelways	OJHL	4	1	1	2	6	—	—	—	—	—
1984–85	Hamilton Steelhawks	OHL	66	23	30	53	86	—	—	—	—	—
1985–86	Hamilton Steelhawks	OHL	54	22	43	65	79	—	—	—	—	—
1985–86	New York Islanders	NHL	2	1	0	1	0	—	—	—	—	—
1986–87	Hamilton Steelhawks	OHL	60	27	32	59	100	—	—	—	—	—
1986–87	New York Islanders	NHL	—	—	—	—	—	1	0	1	1	0
1987–88	New York Islanders	NHL	38	2	8	10	58	4	0	0	0	19
1987–88	Springfield Indians	AHL	39	13	11	24	76	—	—	—	—	—
1988–89	New York Islanders	NHL	55	11	10	21	86	—	—	—	—	—
1990–91	New York Islanders	NHL	41	3	12	15	24	—	—	—	—	—
1990–91	Capital District Islanders	AHL	27	6	14	20	26	—	—	—	—	—
1991–92	New York Islanders	NHL	15	2	1	3	12	—	—	—	—	—
1991–92	Capital District Islanders	AHL	14	7	8	15	34	—	—	—	—	—
1992–93	New York Islanders	NHL	57	15	17	32	62	18	2	2	4	14
1992–93	Capital District Islanders	AHL	19	10	4	14	16	—	—	—	—	—
1993–94	New York Islanders	NHL	73	11	19	30	62	4	0	1	1	4
1994–95	New York Islanders	NHL	22	3	2	5	14	—	—	—	—	—
1995–96	New York Islanders	NHL	18	1	2	3	14	—	—	—	—	—
NHL totals			321	49	71	120	332	27	2	4	6	37

Preceded by Duncan MacPherson	New York Islanders first-round draft pick 1985	Succeeded by Derek King
