= Michael Landsberg =

Canadian sports journalist (born 1957)

- Born: July 22, 1957 (age 69); Canada
- Occupations: Sports journalist, radio host

Michael Elliott Landsberg MSM (born July 22, 1957) is a Canadian sports journalist and the former host of TSN's, First Up with Landsberg and Colaiacovo, and former host of TSN's Off the Record with Michael Landsberg from 1997 to 2015.

== Broadcasting career ==
Landsberg was with TSN since the network's inception in 1984, where he started his national career as an anchor on TSN's SportsDesk, broadcasting more than 5,000 episodes. Landsberg hosted TSN's 30-minute daily sports debate program Off the Record from 1997 to 2015, one of Canada's longest running talk shows. Previously the co-host of TSN 1050's Naylor & Landsberg in the morning, he formerly hosted TSN's First Up with Landsberg and Colaiacovo with former Toronto Maple Leafs player Carlo Colaiacovo.

Landsberg covered figure skating at the 1988 Winter Olympics in Calgary, and has also covered Canadian college football and horse racing. He also hosted the network's coverage of the Dubin Inquiry.

Twice nominated for the Gemini Award for Best Host or Interviewer in a Sports Program or Sportscast, Landsberg was the Whistler Host for Olympic Daytime on CTV during the Vancouver 2010 Olympic Winter Games.

During the London 2012 Olympic Games, he anchored TSN's Olympic Daytime.

Landsberg left TSN in July 2021.

== Personal life ==
Landsberg has generalized anxiety disorder and depression. Landsberg is a supporter for mental health awareness and is trying to popularize the hashtag #sicknotweak in tribute to his mental illness. Landsberg has since transformed #sicknotweak from a trending topic to a movement with the launch of sicknotweak.com – a forum for those suffering from depression and a resource for those supporting a loved one who needs help. He has visited different schools in Canada to promote awareness of depression, and to help those who have it.

Landsberg has been an ambassador for Bell Let's Talk, an initiative focused on raising awareness and encouraging dialogue about mental health, since the initiative launched in 2011. Landsberg is Jewish.

== Awards ==
In 2012, the Canadian Alliance on Mental Illness and Mental Health named Landsberg one of its Champions of Mental Health.

Landsberg's documentary, Darkness and Hope: Depression, Sports and Me earned a Canadian Screen Award nomination in 2013.

For his longstanding dedication to promoting mental health awareness, Landsberg was honoured with the Humanitarian Award at the 2015 Canadian Screen Awards.

In 2017, he was awarded a Meritorious Service Medal (Civil Division) for his mental health advocacy, presented by the Governor General of Canada David Johnston, at an Investiture Ceremony held at Rideau Hall on 9 March 2017.
