= 2015 in Canadian music =

This is a summary of the year 2015 in the Canadian music industry.

== Events ==
- March 10 – Rapper Shad is announced as the new host of CBC Radio One's daily arts and culture magazine show Q
- March 15 – Juno Awards of 2015
- March 29 – Chad VanGaalen wins the Prism Prize for his music video for Timber Timbre's song "Beat the Drum Slowly".
- April – East Coast Music Awards
- April 12 – Kevin Bazinet wins the third season of La Voix.
- June 16 – Prelimimary longlist for the 2015 Polaris Music Prize is announced.
- July 9 – Dear Rouge (English) and Antoine Corriveau (French) are announced as the winners of the 2015 SOCAN Songwriting Prize.
- July 16 – Shortlist for the Polaris Music Prize is announced.
- September 21 – Buffy Sainte-Marie wins the Polaris Music Prize for her album Power in the Blood.
- November 8 – 11th Canadian Folk Music Awards

== Bands formed ==
- Saint Asonia

== Albums released ==
=== # ===
- 2Frères, Nous autres

=== A ===
- The Acorn, Vieux Loup – May 19
- Bryan Adams, Get Up! – October 16
- Bernard Adamus, Sorel Soviet So What
- a l l i e, Moonlust
- Marie-Pierre Arthur, Si l'aurore – February
- Astral Swans, All My Favorite Singers Are Willie Nelson

=== B ===
- BADBADNOTGOOD with Ghostface Killah, Sour Soul – February 17
- Barenaked Ladies, Silverball – June 2
- Alexis Baro, Guilty Pleasure
- Eric Bearclaw, Strains
- Justin Bieber, Purpose
- Big Brave, Au De La
- The Blue Stones, Black Holes - October 20
- Philippe Brach, Portraits de famine
- Braids, Deep in the Iris – April 28
- Dean Brody, Gypsy Road – April 21
- Michael Jerome Browne, Sliding Delta
- Burnstick, Dream Big, Little One / Fais de beaux rêves, petit ange
- Spencer Burton, Some That Were, Some That Are and Some That Will Be

=== C ===
- Kathryn Calder, Kathryn Calder
- Cancer Bats, Searching for Zero – March 10
- Cannon Bros., Dream City
- Alessia Cara, Four Pink Walls – August 28
- Casper Skulls, Lips & Skull
- Chic Gamine, Light a Match
- Ramon Chicharron, Uepaje
- Annabelle Chvostek, Be the Media – April 30
- Cindy Lee, Act of Tenderness
- Cindy Lee, Malenkost
- City and Colour, If I Should Go Before You – October 9
- Tom Cochrane, Take It Home – February 10
- Cœur de pirate, Roses – August 28
- Concealer, feted:fetid
- Louis-Jean Cormier, Les Grandes artères – March 23
- Corridor, Le Voyage Éternel

=== D ===
- Danko Jones, Fire Music – February 6
- Thomas D'Arcy, Fooled You Twice
- Dear Rouge, Black to Gold
- The Dears, Times Infinity Volume One – September 25
- Mac DeMarco, Demos Volume One – January 20
- Destroyer, Poison Season – August 28
- Devours, Avalon
- Digawolf, Great Northern Man
- Dilly Dally, Sore
- Alan Doyle, So Let's Go
- Drake, If You're Reading This It's Too Late – February 14

=== E ===
- Eccodek, Remixing in Tongues
- The Elwins, Play for Keeps – February 24
- Exco Levi, Country Man – March 17

=== F ===
- Michael Feuerstack, The Forgettable Truth – February 17
- Flying Hórses, Tölt
- Foxtrott, A Taller Us
- Jeanick Fournier, Mes coups de cœur
- Fresh Snow, WON
- Lily Frost, Too Hot for Words

=== G ===
- Galaxie, Zulu – February 24
- Godspeed You! Black Emperor, Asunder, Sweet and Other Distress – March 31
- The Golden Dogs, 3 1/2 – February 17
- Grand Analog, Roll Dub Soul Rap – October 8
- Great Lake Swimmers, A Forest of Arms – April 21
- Grimes, Art Angels

=== H ===
- Half Moon Run, Sun Leads Me On – October 23
- Harrison, Colors
- Ron Hawkins and the Do Good Assassins, Garden Songs – February 3
- Hayden, Hey Love – March 24
- Hedley, Hello
- Hello, Blue Roses, WZO – February
- The High Dials, In the AM Wilds – February 3
- Hilotrons, To Trip with Terpsichore
- Hollerado, 111 Songs – March 24
- Andrew Hyatt, Never Back Down

=== J ===
- Tobias Jesso Jr., Goon – March 17
- Carly Rae Jepsen, E•MO•TION – August 21
- Lyndon John X, Escape from the Mongoose Gang

=== K ===
- k-os, Can't Fly Without Gravity – September 4
- Andy Kim, It's Decided – February 24
- The King Khan & BBQ Show, Bad News Boys
- Brett Kissel, Pick Me Up – September 11
- Koriass, Petit love
- Diana Krall, Wallflower – February 2
- Nicholas Krgovich, On Cahuenga

=== L ===
- Jean Leloup, À Paradis City
- Library Voices, Lovish
- Limblifter, Pacific Milk – April 7

=== M ===
- Majical Cloudz, Are You Alone?
- Catherine Major, La maison du monde
- Dan Mangan + Blacksmith, Club Meds – January 13
- Cory Marks, This Man – May 26
- Kalle Mattson, Avalanche
- Mauno, Rough Master
- Michelle McAdorey, Into Her Future – October 30
- Linda McRae, Shadow Trails
- Shawn Mendes, Handwritten
- Metric, Pagans in Vegas – September 18
- METZ, METZ II
- Ariane Moffatt, 22h22
- The Most Serene Republic, Mediac – November 13

=== N ===
- Laura Niquay, Waratanak
- Safia Nolin, Limoilou

=== O ===
- Lindi Ortega, Faded Gloryville – August 7

=== P ===
- Dorothea Paas, Calm Your Body Down
- Philémon Cimon, Les femmes comme des montagnes
- Joel Plaskett, The Park Avenue Sobriety Test – March 3
- William Prince, Earthly Days
- Purity Ring, Another Eternity – March 3

=== R ===
- Rah Rah, Vessels – March
- Rattlesnake Choir, The Prospector's Curse
- Lee Reed, The Butcher, the Banker, the Bitumen Tanker
- Sam Roberts Band, Counting the Days – April 18
- Benjamin Dakota Rogers, Strong Man's Address to the Circus Crowd

=== S ===
- Buffy Sainte-Marie, Power in the Blood – May 12
- Natasha St-Pier, Mon Acadie – October 2
- Samantha Savage Smith, Fine Lines – January 27
- Ivana Santilli, Late Night Light – March 10
- Saint Asonia, Saint Asonia (album) – June 31
- Sarahmée, Légitime
- Lorraine Segato, Invincible Decency
- Ron Sexsmith, Carousel One – March 31
- Silverstein, I Am Alive in Everything I Touch - May 19
- Siskiyou, Nervous – January 20
- Zal Sissokho, Marcus Viana and Ibrahima Gaye, Famalé
- Slim Twig, Thank You for Sticking with Twig – August 7
- Les Sœurs Boulay, 4488 de l'amour
- Jeffery Straker, North Star Falling

=== T ===
- Three Days Grace, Human – March 31
- Tire le coyote, Panorama
- Al Tuck, Fair Country
- Twin Flames, Jaaji and Chelsey June

=== V ===
- Rosie Valland, Partir avant
- Chad VanGaalen and Seth Smith, Seed of Dorzon – September 18
- Jennie Vee, Spying – October 15
- Viet Cong, Viet Cong – January 20
- Vile Creature, A Steady Descent Into the Soil
- Vision Eternel, Echoes from Forgotten Hearts – February 14

=== W ===
- The Wainwright Sisters (Martha Wainwright and Lucy Wainwright Roche), Songs in the Dark – November 13
- Patrick Watson, Love Songs for Robots
- The Weather Station, Loyalty – May 5
- The Weeknd, Beauty Behind the Madness – August 28
- The Wet Secrets, Tyranny of Objects
- Whitehorse, Leave No Bridge Unburned – February 17
- Hawksley Workman, Old Cheetah

=== Y ===
- Yoan, Yoan – March 25
- Yukon Blonde, On Blonde – June 16

== Top hits on record ==
The lists are updated weekly through Nielsen Soundscan.

=== Albums ===
Rank	Artist	Album	Peak position	Sales	Certification
1	Yoan	Yoan	1	90,000	Gold
2	Mumford & Sons	Wilder Mind	1	40,000	TBA
3	Drake	If You're Reading This It's Too Late	1	37,000	TBA
4	Various Artists	Fifty Shades of Grey: Original Motion Picture Soundtrack	1	26,200	Gold
5	Kendrick Lamar	To Pimp a Butterfly	1	21,000	TBA
6	Jean Leloup	À Paradis City	1	21,000	Gold
7	Madonna	Rebel Heart	1	20,400	TBA
8	Florence and the Machine	How Big, How Blue, How Beautiful	1	19,000	TBA
9	Of Monsters and Men	Beneath the Skin	1	16,000	TBA
10	Various Artists	La Voix III	1	15,300	TBA

=== Singles ===
Rank	Artist	Song	Album	Peak position	Sales	Certification
1	Wiz Khalifa featuring Charlie Puth	"See You Again"	Furious 7: Original Motion Picture Soundtrack	1	117,000	3× Platinum
2	Rihanna, Kanye West and Paul McCartney	"FourFiveSeconds"	TBA	3	34,000	TBA
3	Taylor Swift featuring Kendrick Lamar	"Bad Blood"	1989	1	24,000	TBA
4	Mumford & Sons	"Believe"	Wilder Mind	11	19,000	TBA
5	David Guetta featuring Nicki Minaj, Bebe Rexha and Afrojack	"Hey Mama"	Listen	9	TBA	Platinum
6	Deorro featuring Chris Brown	"Five More Hours"	TBA	57	TBA	Platinum
7	Maroon 5	"Sugar"	V	3	TBA	Platinum
8	Carly Rae Jepsen	"I Really Like You"	Emotion	14	TBA	Gold
9	Ed Sheeran	"Photograph"	x	38	TBA	Gold
10	Ellie Goulding	"Love Me like You Do"	Fifty Shades of Grey: Original Motion Picture Soundtrack	3	TBA	Gold

=== Canadian Hot 100 Year-End List ===
No.	Artist(s)	Title
1	Mark Ronson featuring Bruno Mars	"Uptown Funk"
2	Ed Sheeran	"Thinking Out Loud"
3	Omi	"Cheerleader"
4	Wiz Khalifa featuring Charlie Puth	"See You Again"
5	Maroon 5	"Sugar"
6	Taylor Swift	"Blank Space"
7	Hozier	"Take Me to Church"
8	The Weeknd	"Can't Feel My Face"
9	Major Lazer and DJ Snake featuring MØ	"Lean On"
10	Walk the Moon	"Shut Up and Dance"
11	Taylor Swift featuring Kendrick Lamar	"Bad Blood"
12	Jason Derulo	"Want to Want Me"
13	Ellie Goulding	"Love Me like You Do"
14	Andy Grammer	"Honey, I'm Good."
15	Skrillex and Diplo featuring Justin Bieber	"Where Are Ü Now"
16	Ed Sheeran	"Photograph"
17	Taylor Swift	"Shake It Off"
18	The Weeknd	"The Hills"
19	Justin Bieber	"What Do You Mean?"
20	Fetty Wap	"Trap Queen"
21	X Ambassadors	"Renegades"
22	Rihanna, Kanye West and Paul McCartney	"FourFiveSeconds"
23	Rachel Platten	"Fight Song"
24	David Guetta featuring Nicki Minaj, Bebe Rexha and Afrojack	"Hey Mama"
25	Adele	"Hello"
26	Taylor Swift	"Style"
27	Shawn Mendes	"Stitches"
28	Sam Smith	"I'm Not the Only One"
29	The Weeknd	"Earned It"
30	Selena Gomez featuring ASAP Rocky	"Good for You"
31	R. City featuring Adam Levine	"Locked Away"
32	Fifth Harmony featuring Kid Ink	"Worth It"
33	Sam Hunt	"Take Your Time"
34	Meghan Trainor	"Lips Are Movin"
35	Elle King	"Ex's & Oh's"
36	Meghan Trainor	"All About That Bass"
37	Vance Joy	"Riptide"
38	Sia	"Elastic Heart"
39	Taylor Swift	"Wildest Dreams"
40	Shawn Mendes	"Something Big"
41	Maroon 5	"Animals"
42	Silentó	"Watch Me (Whip/Nae Nae)"
43	Drake	"Hotline Bling"
44	Nick Jonas	"Jealous"
45	Pitbull and Ne-Yo	"Time of Our Lives"
46	Lillywood and Robin Schulz	"Prayer in C"
47	Shawn Hook	"Sound of Your Heart"
48	Ella Henderson	"Ghost"
49	George Ezra	"Budapest"
50	Tove Lo	"Talking Body"
51	Flo Rida featuring Sage the Gemini and Lookas	"G.D.F.R."
52	One Direction	"Drag Me Down"
53	AronChupa	"I'm an Albatraoz"
54	Demi Lovato	"Cool for the Summer"
55	Tove Lo	"Habits (Stay High)"
56	Macklemore & Ryan Lewis featuring Eric Nally, Melle Mel, Kool Moe Dee and Grandmaster Caz	"Downtown"
57	Ariana Grande	"One Last Time"
58	Calvin Harris featuring Ellie Goulding	"Outside"
59	Mr Probz	"Waves"
60	Alessia Cara	"Here"
61	Ariana Grande and The Weeknd	"Love Me Harder"
62	Sia	"Chandelier"
63	Selena Gomez	"The Heart Wants What It Wants"
64	Sam Smith	"Stay with Me"
65	Calvin Harris and Disciples	"How Deep Is Your Love"
66	Fetty Wap featuring Remy Boyz	"679"
67	Justin Bieber	"Sorry"
68	Walk off the Earth	"Rule the World"
69	Imagine Dragons	"I Bet My Life"
70	Jessie J, Ariana Grande and Nicki Minaj	"Bang Bang"
71	Coleman Hell	"2 Heads"
72	Ed Sheeran	"Don't"
73	Pharrell Williams	"Happy"
74	John Legend	"All of Me"
75	DJ Snake and AlunaGeorge	"You Know You Like It"
76	Rihanna	"Bitch Better Have My Money"
77	Magic!	"No Way No"
78	Charlie Puth featuring Meghan Trainor	"Marvin Gaye"
79	Hailee Steinfeld	"Love Myself"
80	Jocelyn Alice	"Jackpot"
81	Scott Helman	"Bungalow"
82	Kelly Clarkson	"Heartbeat Song"
83	James Newton Howard featuring Jennifer Lawrence	"The Hanging Tree"
84	Maroon 5	"This Summer's Gonna Hurt like a MotherFucker"
85	Little Big Town	"Girl Crush"
86	Pitbull featuring Chris Brown	"Fun"
87	Natalie La Rose featuring Jeremih	"Somebody"
88	Carly Rae Jepsen	"I Really Like You"
89	Luke Bryan	"Kick the Dust Up"
90	Keith Urban	"John Cougar, John Deere, John 3:16"
91	Magic!	"Let Your Hair Down"
92	Sam Hunt	"House Party"
93	Zedd featuring Selena Gomez	"I Want You to Know"
94	Magic!	"Rude"
95	Francesco Yates	"Better to Be Loved"
96	Meghan Trainor	"Dear Future Husband"
97	Calvin Harris featuring John Newman	"Blame"
98	Sam Smith	"Lay Me Down"
99	Mumford & Sons	"Believe"
100	Nick Jonas	"Chains"

== Deaths ==
- June 8 – Archie Alleyne, 82, jazz drummer
- November 19 – Ron Hynes, 64, singer-songwriter

Preceded by 2014 in Canadian music	Canadian music 2015	Succeeded by 2016 in Canadian music
