= 2016 in Canadian music =

The following is a list of notable events and releases that happened in 2016 in music in Canada.

== Events ==
- April 3 – Juno Awards of 2016
- April 17 – Final concert by the influential folk-rock band Spirit of the West.
- April – East Coast Music Awards
- May 15 – Prism Prize presented.
- May 24 – The Tragically Hip announce that lead singer Gord Downie has been diagnosed with inoperable brain cancer.
- June 15 – Preliminary longlist for the 2016 Polaris Music Prize is announced.
- July – SOCAN Songwriting Prize is presented.
- July 14 – Shortlist for the Polaris Music Prize is announced.
- July 22 – The Tragically Hip play the first date of their Man Machine Poem Tour in Victoria, British Columbia.
- August 20 – The Canadian Broadcasting Corporation broadcasts The Tragically Hip's concert at the K-Rock Centre in their hometown of Kingston, which may be the band's last-ever live concert due to Gord Downie's cancer diagnosis, as a live cross-platform broadcast on CBC Television, CBC Radio One, CBC Radio 2, CBC Music and YouTube.
- September 19 – Kaytranada's album 99.9% is named the winner of the Polaris Music Prize.
- December 3 – 12th Canadian Folk Music Awards

== Bands disbanded ==
- Nomeansno
- Spirit of the West

== Albums released ==
=== A ===
- Aerialists, Aerialists
- AHI, We Made It Through the Wreckage
- Alaskan Tapes, We All Speak in Poems
- Altameda, Dirty Rain
- Ammoye, Enter the Warrioress
- Amylie, Les Éclats
- Matt Andersen, Honest Man – February 26
- Ancient Shapes, Ancient Shapes
- Tafari Anthony, Die for You
- Anvil, Anvil Is Anvil – February 26

=== B ===
- Badbadnotgood, IV – July 8
- Jason Bajada, Volcano – February 12
- Matthew Barber and Jill Barber, The Family Album – April 1
- Alexis Baro, Sugar Rush
- Bobby Bazini, Summer Is Gone
- Bear Mountain, BADU – September 9
- Daniel Bélanger, Paloma - November 25
- Art Bergmann, The Apostate – May 13
- The Besnard Lakes, A Coliseum Complex Museum – January 22
- Black Mountain, TBA
- Blackburn Brothers, Brothers in This World
- Jean-Michel Blais, Il
- Bleu Jeans Bleu, Franchement wow
- Blue Moon Marquee, Gypsy Blues
- Blue Rodeo, 1000 Arms – October 28
- Will Bonness, Halcyon
- Brasstronaut, Brasstronaut – November 11
- Alysha Brilla, Human
- Jim Bryson, Somewhere We Will Find Our Place – February 12
- Basia Bulat, Good Advice – February 12
- The Burning Hell, Public Library – April 1

=== C ===
- Brendan Canning, Home Wrecking Years – August 12
- Charlotte Cardin, Big Boy
- Jazz Cartier, Hotel Paranoia
- Tanika Charles, Soul Run – May 10
- Classified, Greatful – January 15
- Ora Cogan, Shadowland
- Leonard Cohen, You Want It Darker
- Jason Collett, Song and Dance Man – February 5
- Antoine Corriveau, Cette chose qui cognait au creux de sa poitrine sans vouloir s'arrêter
- Crown Lands, Mantra
- Lori Cullen, Sexsmith Swinghammer Songs

=== D ===
- The Damn Truth, Devilish Folk
- Dead Obies, Gestamtkunstwerk – March 4
- Del Barber & the No Regretzkys, The Puck Drops Here
- Art d'Ecco, Day Fevers
- Devours, Late Bloomers
- Céline Dion, Encore un soir – August 26
- The Dirty Nil, Higher Power – February 26
- Gord Downie, Secret Path – October 18
- Drake, Views – April 29

=== E ===
- Earle and Coffin, Live at the Citadel House
- Micah Erenberg, Poor Mic's Toe

=== F ===
- The Flatliners, TBA
- Luca Fogale, Safety
- Fond of Tigers, Uninhabit – October 7
- Fresh Snow, ONE

=== G ===
- The Garrys, Warm Buds
- Karina Gauvin, Divine Karina – February 12
- Hannah Georgas, For Evelyn
- Matthew Good, I Miss New Wave: Beautiful Midnight Revisited – December 2
- Aaron Goodvin, Aaron Goodvin
- Great Lake Swimmers, Swimming Away

=== H ===
- Harrison, Checkpoint Titanium
- Ron Hawkins, Spit Sputter and Sparkle – March 25
- Tim Hecker, TBA
- Angela Hewitt, Domenico Scarlatti Sonatas – February 12
- The Hidden Cameras, Home on Native Land
- Matt Holubowski, Solitudes
- Holy Fuck, TBA

=== I ===
- Ice Cream, Love, Ice Cream

=== J ===
- Sammy Jackson, Take Me Back
- July Talk, Touch – September 9
- Junior Boys, Big Black Coat – February 5

=== K ===
- Kaytranada, 99.9% – May 6
- Aidan Knight, Each Other – January 22
- Koriass, Love Suprême
- Chantal Kreviazuk, Hard Sail – July 17
- Nicholas Krgovich, The Hills
- Patrick Krief, Automanic – September 30

=== L ===
- Land of Talk, TBA
- k.d. lang with Neko Case and Laura Veirs, case/lang/veirs
- Salomé Leclerc, Live au Treatment
- Little Scream, TBA
- Les Louanges, Le Mercure

=== M ===
- The Maddigans, No Place Like Here – April 4
- Ria Mae, Ria Mae – June 3
- Magic!, Primary Colours – July 1
- Majid Jordan, Majid Jordan – February 5
- Kate Maki, Head in the Sand – May 20
- Dan Mangan, Unmake – June 17
- Carolyn Mark, Come! Back! Special!
- Shawn Mendes, Illuminate
- Dylan Menzie, Adolescent Nature
- Millimetrik, Fog Dreams
- Ryland Moranz, Hello New Old World

=== N ===
- Nap Eyes, Thought Rock Fish Scale
- Sarah Neufeld, The Ridge – February 26

=== O ===
- The Oot n' Oots, Songs and Tales from the Great Blue Whale
- Karim Ouellet, Trente – March 11

=== P ===
- Dorothea Paas, No Loose Ends
- PartyNextDoor, PartyNextDoor 3 – August 12
- Philémon Cimon, Psychanalysez-vous avec Philémon Cimon
- Lido Pimienta, La Papessa
- Plants and Animals, Waltzed in from the Rumbling – April 29
- Protest The Hero, Pacific Myth – November 18

=== R ===
- Radio Radio, Light the Sky – February 19
- Allan Rayman, Hotel Allan
- Corin Raymond, Hobo Jungle Fever Dreams
- Amanda Rheaume, Holding Patterns
- River Tiber, Indigo - June 24
- Benjamin Dakota Rogers, Whisky & Pine
- Royal Canoe, Something Got Lost Between Here and the Orbit
- Rum Ragged, Rum Ragged
- Justin Rutledge, East – September 30
- Serena Ryder, Utopia

=== S ===
- Sam Roberts Band, Terraform – October 28
- John K. Samson, Winter Wheat – October 21
- SATE, RedBlack&Blue
- Ségala, Plato Hess
- Andy Shauf, The Party – May 20
- Mike Shabb, Sewaside LP
- Crystal Shawanda, Fish Out of Water
- Shotgun Jimmie, Field of Trampolines
- Simple Plan, Taking One for the Team – February 19
- Dallas Smith, Side Effects - September 2
- So Loki, V
- Solids, Else
- Souldia, Sacrifice
- John Southworth, Small Town Water Tower
- Rae Spoon, Armour – February 19
- Frederick Squire, Spooky Action at a Distance – May 27
- The Strumbellas, Hope – February 5
- Sussex, Parade Day
- Suuns, Hold/Still

=== T ===
- Tanya Tagaq, Retribution – October 21
- Tasha the Amazon, Die Every Day
- Tegan and Sara, Love You to Death – June 3
- Tory Lanez, I Told You – August 19
- The Tragically Hip, Man Machine Poem – June 17
- A Tribe Called Red, We Are the Halluci Nation
- Tuns, Tuns – August 26

=== U ===
- Un Blonde, Good Will Come to You

=== V ===
- Mathew V, Sounds
- Rosie Valland, Nord-Est
- Venetian Snares, Traditional Synthesizer Music – February 20
- Lindy Vopnfjörð, Frozen in Time – October 28

=== W ===
- Martha Wainwright, Goodnight City
- Frank Walker, Nocturnal
- Dawn Tyler Watson, Jawbreaker!
- Weaves, Weaves
- The Weeknd, Starboy – November 25
- White Lung, Paradise
- WHOOP-Szo, Citizen's Ban(ne)d Radio
- Wild Rivers, Wild Rivers
- Wintersleep, The Great Detachment – March 4
- Woodpigeon, TROUBLE
- Royal Wood, Ghost Light
- Donovan Woods, Hard Settle, Ain't Troubled – February 26
- Roy Woods, Nocturnal – December 23
- Roy Woods, Waking at Dawn – July 1

=== Y ===
- Ken Yates, Huntsville
- You Say Party, You Say Party – February 12
- Your Boy Tony Braxton, Adult Contempt – July 15

=== Z ===
- The Zolas, Swooner – March 4

== Year-End List ==
№	Artist(s)	Title
1	Justin Bieber	"Sorry"
2	Justin Bieber	"Love Yourself"
3	Sia featuring Sean Paul	"Cheap Thrills"
4	Drake featuring Wizkid and Kyla	"One Dance"
5	Mike Posner	"I Took a Pill in Ibiza"
6	Twenty One Pilots	"Stressed Out"
7	Lukas Graham	"7 Years"
8	The Chainsmokers featuring Daya	"Don't Let Me Down"
9	Adele	"Hello"
10	The Chainsmokers featuring Halsey	"Closer"
11	Calvin Harris featuring Rihanna	"This Is What You Came For"
12	Fifth Harmony featuring Ty Dolla Sign	"Work from Home"
13	Rihanna featuring Drake	"Work"
14	Justin Timberlake	"Can't Stop the Feeling!"
15	DNCE	"Cake by the Ocean"
16	Desiigner	"Panda"
17	Flo Rida	"My House"
18	Major Lazer featuring Justin Bieber and MØ	"Cold Water"
19	Justin Bieber	"What Do You Mean?"
20	Zayn	"Pillowtalk"
21	G-Eazy and Bebe Rexha	"Me, Myself & I"
22	Twenty One Pilots	"Heathens"
23	Shawn Mendes	"Treat You Better"
24	The Chainsmokers featuring Rozes	"Roses"
25	Drake	"Hotline Bling"
26	Drake featuring Rihanna	"Too Good"
27	Alessia Cara	"Wild Things"
28	Twenty One Pilots	"Ride"
29	Adele	"Send My Love (To Your New Lover)"
30	Ariana Grande	"Into You"
31	DJ Snake featuring Justin Bieber	"Let Me Love You"
32	The Weeknd featuring Daft Punk	"Starboy"
33	Meghan Trainor	"Me Too"
34	Charlie Puth featuring Selena Gomez	"We Don't Talk Anymore"
35	Pink	"Just Like Fire"
36	The Weeknd	"Can't Feel My Face"
37	Kungs vs. Cookin' on 3 Burners	"This Girl"
38	Rihanna	"Needed Me"
39	The Weeknd	"The Hills"
40	Selena Gomez	"Hands to Myself"
41	Ariana Grande	"Dangerous Woman"
42	Meghan Trainor	"No"
43	Shawn Mendes	"Stitches"
44	Selena Gomez	"Same Old Love"
45	Zara Larsson and MNEK	"Never Forget You"
46	Ruth B	"Lost Boy"
47	Meghan Trainor featuring John Legend	"Like I'm Gonna Lose You"
48	DJ Snake featuring Bipolar Sunshine	"Middle"
49	Nick Jonas featuring Tove Lo	"Close"
50	Gnash featuring Olivia O'Brien	"I Hate U, I Love U"
51	Flume featuring Kai	"Never Be like You"
52	Major Lazer and DJ Snake featuring MØ	"Lean On"
53	Kiiara	"Gold"
54	Coleman Hell	"2 Heads"
55	Ariana Grande featuring Nicki Minaj	"Side to Side"
56	Charlie Puth	"One Call Away"
57	Alan Walker	"Faded"
58	Coldplay	"Adventure of a Lifetime"
59	Fetty Wap featuring Remy Boyz	"679"
60	Major Lazer featuring Nyla and Fuse ODG	"Light It Up"
61	One Direction	"Perfect"
62	Sia featuring Kendrick Lamar	"The Greatest"
63	Kent Jones	"Don't Mind"
64	Lil Wayne, Wiz Khalifa and Imagine Dragons featuring Logic, Ty Dolla Sign and X Ambassadors	"Sucker for Pain"
65	Florida Georgia Line	"H.O.L.Y."
66	Drake	"Controlla"
67	The Weeknd	"In the Night"
68	Selena Gomez	"Kill Em with Kindness"
69	Daya	"Hide Away"
70	Taylor Swift	"Wildest Dreams"
71	X Ambassadors	"Renegades"
72	Future featuring The Weeknd	"Low Life"
73	Adele	"When We Were Young"
74	Fifth Harmony featuring Fetty Wap	"All in My Head (Flex)"
75	James Bay	"Let It Go"
76	Drake featuring The Throne	"Pop Style"
77	The Strumbellas	"Spirits"
78	Ellie Goulding	"On My Mind"
79	Alessia Cara	"Here"
80	R. City featuring Adam Levine	"Locked Away"
81	Martin Garrix and Bebe Rexha	"In the Name of Love"
82	Tory Lanez	"Luv"
83	Wiz Khalifa featuring Charlie Puth	"See You Again"
84	Jonas Blue featuring Dakota	"Fast Car"
85	DRAM featuring Lil Yachty	"Broccoli"
86	Shawn Mendes and Camila Cabello	"I Know What You Did Last Summer"
87	Ariana Grande	"Focus"
88	Hailee Steinfeld and Grey featuring Zedd	"Starving"
89	Coleman Hell	"Fireproof"
90	Magic! featuring Sean Paul	"Lay You Down Easy"
91	Hedley	"Lose Control"
92	Skrillex and Diplo featuring Justin Bieber	"Where Are Ü Now"
93	Belly featuring The Weeknd	"Might Not"
94	Hedley	"Hello"
95	Elle King	"Ex's & Oh's"
96	Keith Urban	"Wasted Time"
97	Omi	"Cheerleader"
98	OneRepublic	"Wherever I Go"
99	Silentó	"Watch Me (Whip/Nae Nae)"
100	Calvin Harris and Disciples	"How Deep Is Your Love"

== Deaths ==
- January 3 – Paul Bley, jazz pianist
- January 14 – René Angélil, 73, entertainment manager (Celine Dion)
- February 3 – Brad Kent, musician (D.O.A., Avengers)
- February 6 – Gilles Brown, singer
- February 15 – Vanity, 57, singer
- March 9 – Ray Griff, 75, country music singer and songwriter
- March 30 – Howard Cable, conductor, composer and arranger
- April 3 – Don Francks, 84, jazz vocalist and actor
- April 27 – Philip Kives, founder of K-tel
- June 4 – Bobby Curtola, 73, singer
- June 8 – Brian Rading, 69, bassist Five Man Electrical Band
- June 21 – Pierre Lalonde, singer and television host
- July 4 – William Hawkins, songwriter and poet
- July 9 – Geneviève Castrée, musician and comic book artist
- July 29 – Lucille Dumont, singer
- July 31 – Penny Lang, folk musician
- September 3 – Raymond Daveluy, composer and organist
- October 29 – Paul Demers, singer-songwriter
- November 7 – Leonard Cohen, singer-songwriter
