= 2014 in Canadian music =

This is a summary of the year 2014 in the Canadian music industry.

== Events ==
- March 23 – Arcade Fire's video for "Afterlife", directed by Emily Kai Bock, wins the 2014 Prism Prize.
- March 30 – Juno Awards of 2014
- April – 2014 East Coast Music Awards
- June 19 – Prelimimary longlist for the 2014 Polaris Music Prize is announced.
- July 15 – Shortlist for the Polaris Music Prize is announced.
- September 22 – Tanya Tagaq wins the Polaris Music Prize for her album Animism.
- November 29 – 10th Canadian Folk Music Awards

== Bands on hiatus ==
- Hedley
- Crystal Castles

== Bands reformed ==
- Stereos
- The Smalls

== Albums released ==
=== A ===
- Alvvays, Alvvays – July 22
- Matt Andersen, Weightless – January 28
- Jann Arden, Everything Almost – April 29
- Arkells, High Noon – August 5
- Rich Aucoin, Ephemeral – September 9
- Austra, Habitat (EP) – June 17
- Ayrad, Ayrad – October 28

=== B ===
- Philippe B, Ornithologie, la nuit – April
- BadBadNotGood, III – May 6
- Bahamas, Bahamas Is Afie – August 19
- Del Barber, Prairieography – February 4
- Jill Barber, Fool's Gold – June 17
- Matthew Barber, Big Romance – May 27
- The Barr Brothers, Sleeping Operator – October 7
- Barzin, To Live Alone in That Long Summer – February 24
- Bobby Bazini, Where I Belong – May 10
- The Beaches, Heights
- Bend Sinister, Animals – March 11
- Ridley Bent, Wildcard
- Art Bergmann, Songs for the Underclass – August 26
- Bidiniband, The Motherland – May 29
- Big Brave, Feral Verdure
- Big Wreck, Ghosts – June 10
- Billy Talent, Hits – November 4
- The Birthday Massacre, Superstition – November 11
- Blackie and the Rodeo Kings, South – January 14
- Blue Moon Marquee, Lonesome Hearts and Last Dollar
- Blue Rodeo, A Merrie Christmas to You – November 4
- Isabelle Boulay, Merci Serge Reggiani
- Philippe Brach, La foire et l'ordre
- Buck 65, Neverlove – September 30
- Buck 65 with Jorun Bombay, Laundromat Boogie – September 29
- Mariel Buckley, Motorhome
- T. Buckley, Nowhere Fast
- Spencer Burton, Don't Let the World See Your Love
- Matthew Byrne, Hearts and Heroes

=== C ===
- Steph Cameron, Sad-Eyed Lonesome Lady
- Paul Cargnello, The Hardest Part Is You May Never Know
- Caribou, Our Love – October 7
- Jennifer Castle, Pink City – September 2
- Chic Gamine, Christmas, Vol. 1
- Chromeo, White Women – April
- Cœur de pirate, Trauma: Chansons de la serie tele Saison 5 – January 14
- Adam Cohen, We Go Home – September 16
- Leonard Cohen, Popular Problems – September 23
- Cold Specks, Neuroplasticity – August 26
- Antoine Corriveau, Les Ombres longues
- Cousins, The Halls of Wickwire – May 13
- Rose Cousins, Stray Birds – September 2
- Devin Cuddy, Kitchen Knife
- Amelia Curran, They Promised You Mercy – November 4

=== D ===
- Danko Jones, Garage Rock – April 8
- deadmau5, (1<2) – June 17
- Death From Above 1979 – The Physical World – September 9
- Tony Dekker, Sings 10 Years of Zunior – August 5
- Mac DeMarco, Salad Days – April 1
- Devours, 24th & Main
- Digging Roots, For the Light
- Celine Dion, Céline une seule fois / Live 2013 – May 16
- Dirty Beaches, Stateless – November 4
- Down With Webster, Party For Your Life – January 28
- Gordon Downie and The Sadies, And the Conquering Sun – April 15
- Kevin Drew, Darlings – March 18
- Victoria Duffield, Accelerate – June 3
- Marc Dupré, Là dans ma tête
- Durham County Poets, Chikkaboodah Stew

=== E ===
- Eccodek, Singing in Tongues
- Thompson Egbo-Egbo, Short Stories
- Elephant Stone, The Three Poisons – August 26
- Elliott Brood, Work and Love – October 21
- Quique Escamilla, 500 Years of Night

=== F ===
- Christine Fellows, Burning Daylight – September 23
- Michael Feuerstack, Singer Songer – April 29
- Serge Fiori, Serge Fiori – March 11
- Jeremy Fisher, The Lemon Squeeze – May 13
- Frazey Ford, Indian Ocean – October 14
- Fucked Up, Glass Boys – June 3

=== G ===
- Gob, Apt. 13 – August 26
- Jenn Grant, Clairvoyant – May 9
- Jenn Grant, Compostela – October 21
- Emm Gryner, Torrential – April 8

=== H ===
- Kevin Hearn, Days in Frames – November 25
- Ryan Hemsworth, Alone for the First Time – November 4
- Hey Rosetta!, Second Sight – October 21
- The Hidden Cameras, Age – January 21
- Matt Holubowski, Ogen, Old Man

=== I ===
- In-Flight Safety, Conversationalist – September 9
- Brandon Isaak, Here on Earth

=== J ===
- jacksoul, Greatest Hits – November 25
- Junia-T, Eye See You

=== K ===
- Mo Kenney, In My Dreams
- Khotin, Hello World
- Kiesza, Sound of a Woman – October 21
- Diana Krall, Wallflower – September 9
- Nicholas Krgovich, On Sunset
- Kyprios, Midnight Sun

=== L ===
- Lisa LeBlanc, Highways, Heartaches and Time Well Wasted – November 4
- Salomé Leclerc, 27 fois l'aurore
- Catherine Leduc, Rookie
- Library Voices, For John
- Lights, Little Machines – September 23
- Lowell, I Killed Sara V – February
- Lowell, We Loved Her Dearly – September

=== M ===
- Madchild, Switched On
- Magic!, Don't Kill the Magic – July 1
- Jay Malinowski & the Deadcoast, Martel – February 11
- Marie-Mai, M – May 12
- John Mann, The Waiting Room
- Kalle Mattson, Someday, The Moon Will Be Gold – February 11
- Eamon McGrath, Exile, Part 2 – March 11
- Jon McKiel, Jon McKiel
- Sarah McLachlan, Shine On – May 6
- The Meligrove Band, Bones of Things – November 18
- Patrice Michaud, Le Feu de chaque jour
- Millimetrik, Lonely Lights (LP), Remixed Lights (EP)
- Moist, Glory Under Dangerous Skies – October 7
- Monogrenade, Composite – February 4
- Mother Mother, Very Good Bad Thing – November 4
- Mounties, Thrash Rock Legacy – March 4
- Miranda Mulholland, Whipping Boy

=== N ===
- The New Mendicants, Into the Lime – January 28
- The New Pornographers, Brill Bruisers – August 26
- Justin Nozuka, Ulysees – April 15
- NQ Arbuckle, The Future Happens Anyway – April 29

=== O ===
- The OBGMs, The OBGMs
- Oh Susanna, Namedropper – October 7
- Old Man Luedecke, I Never Sang Before I Met You – February 4
- The Olympic Symphonium, Chance to Fate – March 18
- Orange O'Clock, Crazy Carnival

=== P ===
- The Pack A.D., Do Not Engage – January 28
- Owen Pallett, In Conflict – May 13
- Pascale Picard Band, All Things Pass – April 18
- Philémon Cimon, L'Été
- Pink Mountaintops, Get Back – April 29
- Dany Placard, Santa Maria
- The Provincial Archive, It's All Shaken Wonder
- PS I Love You, For Those Who Stay – July 22

=== R ===
- Radio Radio, Ej feel zoo – March 18
- Raised By Swans, Öxnadalur – November 1
- Alyssa Reid, Timebomb – February 11
- Reuben and the Dark, Funeral Sky
- Alejandra Ribera, La Boca – February 4
- The Road Hammers, Wheels – June 1
- Sam Roberts Band, Lo-Fantasy – February 11
- Benjamin Dakota Rogers, Wayfarer
- The Rural Alberta Advantage, Mended with Gold – September 30
- Rush, R40 – November 11
- Justin Rutledge, Daredevil – April 22

=== S ===
- Julien Sagot, Valse 333
- Sargeant X Comrade, Salvage the Soul
- Saukrates, Amani – September 23
- Sea Oleena, Shallow
- Crystal Shawanda, The Whole World's Got the Blues
- Skinny Puppy, The Greater Wrong of the Right (reissue) – January 28
- Sloan, Commonwealth – September 9
- Dallas Smith, Lifted - November 25
- Dallas Smith, Tippin' Point (EP) – March 4
- Meaghan Smith, Have a Heart
- Solids, Blame Confusion
- Solvent, New Ways: Music from "I Dream of Wires" – February 11
- Souldia, Krime grave
- John Southworth, Niagara
- The Stanfields, For King and Country
- Stars, No One Is Lost – October 14
- Jeffery Straker, Live with CBC Radio
- Sunparlour Players, The Living Proof – April 8
- Swollen Members, Brand New Day – June 17

=== T ===
- Tanya Tagaq, Animism – May 27
- The Tea Party, The Ocean at the End – June 24
- Thee Silver Mt. Zion Memorial Orchestra, Fuck Off Get Free We Pour Light on Everything – January 21
- Theory of a Deadman, Savages – July 29
- Thus Owls, Turning Rocks – April 8
- Timber Timbre, Hot Dreams – April 1
- Tokyo Police Club, Forcefield – March 25
- The Tragically Hip, Fully Completely (reissue) – November 17
- The Trews, The Trews – April 22

=== U ===
- Ubiquitous Synergy Seeker, Advanced Basics – February 11
- Un Blonde, Tenet

=== V ===
- Rosie Valland, Rosie Valland
- Chad VanGaalen, Shrink Dust – April 29
- Various Artists, Native North America, Vol. 1 – November 25
- Roch Voisine, My Very Best – February 11

=== W ===
- Rufus Wainwright, Vibrate: The Best of Rufus Wainwright – March 4
- Wake Owl, The Private World of Paradise – March 4
- Weaves, Weaves EP
- Bry Webb, Free Will – May 20
- The Wet Secrets, Free Candy – February 4
- Whitehorse, Éphémère sans repère – April 1
- WHOOP-Szo, Qallunaat/Odemin
- Royal Wood, The Burning Bright – March 4
- The Wooden Sky, Let's Be Ready – September 2

=== Y ===
- Nikki Yanofsky, Little Secret – May 6
- You+Me, rose ave. – October 14
- Neil Young, A Letter Home – April 19

=== Z ===
- Zeus, Classic Zeus – September 2

== Top hits on record ==
The lists are updated weekly through Nielsen Soundscan.

=== Albums ===
==== Top 10 Canadian albums ====
Rank	Artist	Album	Peak position	Sales	Certification
1	Bobby Bazini	Where I Belong	1	102,000	Gold
2	Serge Fiori	Serge Fiori	1	99,000	Gold
3	Nickelback	No Fixed Address	2	80,000	Platinum
4	Leonard Cohen	Popular Problems	1	68,000	Gold
5	Sarah McLachlan	Shine On	1	45,000	Gold
6	Bryan Adams	Tracks of My Years	1	40,000	Gold
7	Isabelle Boulay	Merci Serge Reggiani	N/A	40,000	Gold
8	Marie-Mai	M	2	40,000	Gold
9	Various Artists	Just the Hits 2014	N/A	40,000	Gold
10	Various Artists	La Voix II	2	40,000	Gold

==== Top 10 International albums ====
Rank	Artist	Album	Peak position	Sales	Certification
1	Taylor Swift	1989	1	314,000	TBA
2	Ed Sheeran	x	1	240,000	3× Platinum
3	Sam Smith	In the Lonely Hour	2	160,000	2× Platinum
4	Coldplay	Ghost Stories	1	117,000	Platinum
5	One Direction	Four	1	98,000	Platinum
6	Pink Floyd	The Endless River	1	89,000	Platinum
7	Ariana Grande	My Everything	1	80,000	Platinum
8	The Black Keys	Turn Blue	1	80,000	Platinum
9	Maroon 5	V	1	80,000	Platinum
10	Pharrell Williams	G I R L	2	80,000	Platinum

=== Singles ===
==== Top 10 Singles ====
Rank	Artist	Song	Album	Peak position	Sales	Certification
1	Mark Ronson featuring Bruno Mars	"Uptown Funk"	Uptown Special	1	560,000	7× Platinum
2	Hozier	"Take Me to Church"	Hozier	2	480,000	6× Platinum
3	Meghan Trainor	"All About That Bass"	Title	1	480,000	6× Platinum
4	Ed Sheeran	"Thinking Out Loud"	x	2	400,000	5× Platinum
5	Sam Smith	"Stay with Me"	In the Lonely Hour	1	320,000	4× Platinum
6	Ariana Grande featuring Iggy Azalea	"Problem"	My Everything	3	240,000	3× Platinum
7	Calvin Harris	"Summer"	Motion	3	240,000	3× Platinum
8	Iggy Azalea featuring Charli XCX	"Fancy"	The New Classic	1	240,000	3× Platinum
9	Jessie J featuring Ariana Grande and Nicki Minaj	"Bang Bang"	Sweet Talker	3	240,000	3× Platinum
10	Ariana Grande featuring Zedd	"Break Free"	My Everything	5	160,000	2× Platinum

==== Canadian Hot 100 Year-End List ====
No.	Artist(s)	Title
1	Pharrell Williams	"Happy"
2	John Legend	"All of Me"
3	OneRepublic	"Counting Stars"
4	Pitbull featuring Kesha	"Timber"
5	Magic!	"Rude"
6	Katy Perry featuring Juicy J	"Dark Horse"
7	Meghan Trainor	"All About That Bass"
8	Sam Smith	"Stay with Me"
9	Taylor Swift	"Shake It Off"
10	A Great Big World and Christina Aguilera	"Say Something (A Great Big World song)"
11	Iggy Azalea featuring Charli XCX	"Fancy"
12	Lorde	"Team"
13	Nico & Vinz	"Am I Wrong"
14	Bastille	"Pompeii"
15	Calvin Harris	"Summer"
16	Eminem featuring Rihanna	"The Monster"
17	Imagine Dragons	"Demons"
18	Ariana Grande featuring Iggy Azalea	"Problem"
19	Jason Derulo featuring 2 Chainz	"Talk Dirty"
20	Passenger	"Let Her Go"
21	Avicii	"Wake Me Up"
22	Hedley	"Crazy for You"
23	Maroon 5	"Maps"
24	American Authors	"Best Day of My Life"
25	Avicii	"Hey Brother"
26	Sia	"Chandelier"
27	Kongos	"Come with Me Now"
28	OneRepublic	"Love Runs Out"
29	Kiesza	"Hideaway"
30	Jessie J, Ariana Grande and Nicki Minaj	"Bang Bang"
31	Ed Sheeran	"Sing"
32	One Direction	"Story of My Life"
33	Ariana Grande featuring Zedd	"Break Free"
34	Glenn Morrison featuring Islove	"Goodbye"
35	Lorde	"Royals"
36	Milky Chance	"Stolen Dance"
37	Charli XCX	"Boom Clap"
38	Disclosure featuring Sam Smith	"Latch"
39	Iggy Azalea featuring Rita Ora	"Black Widow"
40	Katy Perry	"Roar"
41	Tove Lo	"Habits (Stay High)"
42	Hedley	"Anything"
43	Ellie Goulding	"Burn"
44	Lady Gaga featuring R. Kelly	"Do What U Want"
45	Justin Timberlake	"Not a Bad Thing"
46	DJ Snake and Lil Jon	"Turn Down for What"
47	Clean Bandit featuring Jess Glynne	"Rather Be"
48	Nicki Minaj	"Anaconda"
49	Drake featuring Majid Jordan	"Hold On, We're Going Home"
50	Katy Perry	"Birthday"
51	Down with Webster	"Chills"
52	Hedley	"Heaven In Our Headlights"
53	Shawn Mendes	"Life of the Party"
54	Enrique Iglesias featuring Descemer Bueno and Gente de Zona	"Bailando"
55	Chromeo	"Jealous (I Ain't with It)"
56	Ed Sheeran	"Don't"
57	Virginia to Vegas featuring Alyssa Reid	"We Are Stars"
58	Coldplay	"A Sky Full of Stars"
59	Capital Cities	"Safe and Sound"
60	Maroon 5	"Animals"
61	Katy Perry	"This Is How We Do"
62	Miley Cyrus	"Wrecking Ball"
63	Sam Smith	"I'm Not the Only One"
64	Mr Probz	"Waves"
65	Katy Perry	"Unconditionally"
66	deadmau5 featuring Colleen D'Agostino	"Seeya"
67	Jason Derulo featuring Snoop Dogg	"Wiggle"
68	Rixton	"Me and My Broken Heart"
69	Vance Joy	"Riptide"
70	Florida Georgia Line featuring Luke Bryan	"This Is How We Roll"
71	Bruno Mars	"Young Girls"
72	Magic!	"Don't Kill the Magic"
73	John Newman	"Love Me Again"
74	Pitbull featuring John Ryan	"Fireball"
75	Luke Bryan	"Play It Again"
76	Robin Thicke featuring T.I. and Pharrell	"Blurred Lines"
77	Imagine Dragons	"Radioactive"
78	Aloe Blacc	"The Man"
79	Idina Menzel	"Let It Go"
80	Florida Georgia Line	"Dirt"
81	Calvin Harris featuring John Newman	"Blame"
82	Lady Antebellum	"Bartender"
83	Hozier	"Take Me to Church"
84	Kristina Maria	"Move Like a Soldier"
85	Macklemore & Ryan Lewis featuring Schoolboy Q and Hollis	"White Walls"
86	The Chainsmokers	"Selfie"
87	Zedd featuring Hayley Williams	"Stay the Night"
88	Kenny Chesney	"American Kids"
89	Michael Jackson and Justin Timberlake	"Love Never Felt So Good"
90	Adventure Club featuring The Kite String Tangle	"Wonder"
91	Serena Ryder	"Fall"
92	Jason Aldean	"Burnin' It Down"
93	Beyoncé featuring Jay-Z	"Drunk in Love"
94	Eric Church	"Give Me Back My Hometown"
95	Paramore	"Ain't It Fun"
96	Classified featuring B.o.B	"Higher"
97	Dierks Bentley	"Drunk on a Plane"
98	Luke Bryan	"Drink a Beer"
99	Demi Lovato featuring Cher Lloyd	"Really Don't Care"
100	Alyssa Reid	"Satisfaction Guaranteed"

== Deaths ==
- February 25 – Angèle Arsenault, singer-songwriter
- February 26 – Georges Hamel, country music singer and songwriter
- March 23 – Dave Brockie, heavy metal singer (Gwar)
- March 25 – Bill Merritt, rock bassist and festival director, director of the Winnipeg Folk Festival, co-founder of the Winnipeg International Children's Festival
- March 29 – Dave Gregg, punk guitarist (D.O.A.)
- May 10 – Nash the Slash (Jeff Plewman), progressive rock musician

Preceded by 2013 in Canadian music	Canadian music 2014	Succeeded by 2015 in Canadian music
