= 2017 iHeartRadio MuchMusic Video Awards =

Edition of music award ceremony

2017 iHeartRadio Much Music Video Awards
- Date: June 18, 2017
- Location: 299 Queen Street West, Toronto
- Country: Canada
- Hosted by: Alessia Cara; Joe Jonas
- Website: http://mmva.muchmusic.com

Television/radio coverage
- Network: Much; CTV; Vrak

The 2017 iHeartRadio Much Music Video Awards (or simply the iHeartRadio MMVAs) were held on June 18, 2017, outside 299 Queen Street West in Toronto, Canada. It was hosted by Joe Jonas and Alessia Cara. Initial announcements were made on April 26, 2017. This is the final ceremony to be held in June and on Father's Day.

Highlights of the broadcast included a red carpet ceremony where Marianas Trench marked their 10th and final year at the MMVAs by arriving covered in dozens of colourful balloons. Lead singer Josh Ramsay emerged from a cardboard cake dressed in a faux whip cream bikini.

During the opening monologue Joe Jonas, who hosted the show eight years earlier with the Jonas Brothers, referenced the pending legalization of marijuana in Canada saying, "This time next year it will be completely legal for Canadians to be blem for real,'' referring to the Drake song "Blem" which uses slang for getting high.

The broadcast also had recurring themes of diversity and acceptance brought up by numerous presenters and winners. When indigenous group A Tribe Called Red won video of the year for "R.E.D.'' guest rapper Narcy spoke out about representation. He told the crowd,

To all the black, brown, indigenous, immigrant, international kids out there: believe in your dreams, make it happen.

== Performances ==
Artist(s)	Song(s)
Pre-show
Jessie Reyez	"Figures"
Kardinal Offishall	DJ
Main show
Camila Cabello	"I Have Questions" "Crying in the Club"
DNCE	"Kissing Strangers"
Julia Michaels	"Issues"
Arkells	"Knocking At the Door"
Iggy Azalea	"Switch"
Post Malone	"White Iverson" "Congratulations"
Imagine Dragons	"Believer" "Thunder"
Jazz Cartier	"Tempted" "Red Alert"
Niall Horan	"This Town" "Slow Hands"
Lorde	"Green Light" "Perfect Places"

== Presenters ==
- KJ Apa
- Nikki Bella
- Lilly Singh (IISuperwomanII)
- Brandon Flynn
- Hedley
- Shay Mitchell
- Bea Miller
- Martha Hunt
- 4YallEntertainment
- Keke Palmer
- Shenae Grimes-Beech
- Serena Ryder
- Jus Reign
- Tyler Oakley
- Dove Cameron
- Tatiana Maslany
- Tyler Shaw
- Shawn Hook
- Scott Helman
- Massari
- Torrance Coombs
- Kat Graham
- David Mazouz
- Lights
- Carly Rae Jepsen

== Winners & nominees ==
Wildcard nominees were announced on May 3, 2017. The full list of nominees was published on May 18, 2017.

=== Video of the Year ===
A Tribe Called Red (featuring Yasiin Bey, Narcy & Black Bear) — "R.E.D."

- Kaytranada (featuring Anderson .Paak) — "Glowed Up"
- Pup — "Sleep in the Heat"
- Shawn Mendes — "Mercy"
- Coleman Hell — "Fireproof"

=== Best Post-Production ===
Sleepy Tom (featuring Tonye) — "Seeing Double" (Post-production: Matt Bilewicz, Zhargal Sambuev, Farah Yusuf, Sean Evans, Ryan Ruskay & Fezz Stenton)

- Darcys — "Miracle" (Post-production: Common Good)
- Somewhere Else (featuring Majid Jordan) — "Move Together" (Post-production: Helmi)
- Zeds Dead (featuring Rivers Cuomo & Pusha T) — "Too Young" (Post-production: James Wright, Tine Kluth & Chris Ullens)
- Cœur de pirate — "Undone" (Post-production: Alain Loiselle, Jérôme Cloutier, Bruno de Coninck Julien Delorme, Andrew Ludovico, Lucy Rybicka & Josh Sherrett)

=== Best EDM/Dance Video ===
Grimes (featuring Janelle Monáe) — "Venus Fly"

- MSTRKRFT — "Runaway"
- Grandtheft (featuring Delaney Jane) — "Easy Go"
- DJ Shub (featuring Northern Cree Singers) — "Indomitable"
- A Tribe Called Red (featuring Yasiin Bey, Narcy & Black Bear) — "R.E.D."

=== Best Director ===
A Tribe Called Red (featuring Black Bear) — "Stadium Pow Wow" (Director: Kevan Funk)

- Zeds Dead (featuring Twin Shadow) — "Stardust" (Director: Adam Beck)
- Wintersleep — "Spirit" (Director: Michael LeBlanc)
- Grimes (featuring Janelle Monáe) — "Venus Fly" (Director: Claire Boucher)
- CRi (featuring Ouri) — "Rush" (Director: Didier Charette)

=== Best Pop Video ===
Shawn Mendes — "Mercy"

- SonReal — "No Warm Up"
- Coleman Hell — "Fireproof"
- Hedley — "Can't Slow Down"
- Grimes (featuring Janelle Monáe) — "Venus Fly"

=== Best Rock/Alternative Video ===
The Tragically Hip — "In a World Possessed by the Human Mind"

- Pup — "Sleep in the Heat"
- Wintersleep — "Spirit"
- July Talk feat. Tanya Tagaq — "Beck + Call"
- Arkells — "Knocking at the Door"

=== Best Hip Hop Video ===
Tasha the Amazon — "Picasso Leaning"

- TassNata (featuring Rich Kidd & Tona) — "Let's Go"
- Sean Leon — "81"
- Jazz Cartier — "Red Alert / 100 Roses"
- Derek Wise — "Disconnected"

=== Best MuchFACT Video ===
River Tiber — "Acid Test"

- Pup — "Sleep in the Heat"
- Majid Jordan — "Small Talk"
- CRi (featuring Ouri) — "Rush"
- dvsn — "With Me / Do It Well"

=== iHeartRadio International Artist of the Year ===
Lorde

- Katy Perry
- Kendrick Lamar
- Ed Sheeran
- Future

=== Most Buzzworthy International Artist or Group ===
Ed Sheeran

- Kendrick Lamar
- Lady Gaga
- Lorde
- Iggy Azalea

=== Most Buzzworthy Canadian Artist ===
Drake

- Justin Bieber
- Shawn Mendes
- The Weeknd
- Alessia Cara

=== iHeartRadio International Duo or Group of the Year ===
Imagine Dragons

- Migos
- The Chainsmokers
- Twenty One Pilots
- DNCE

=== Best New Canadian Artist ===
PARTYNEXTDOOR

- Jessie Reyez
- Charlotte Day Wilson
- Daniel Caesar
- dvsn

=== iHeartRadio Canadian Single of the Year ===
Drake (featuring Wizkid & Kyla) — "One Dance"

- The Weeknd (featuring Daft Punk) — "Starboy"
- Alessia Cara — "Scars to Your Beautiful"

=== Best New International Artist ===
Camila Cabello

- Lil Yachty
- Niall Horan
- Post Malone
- Chance the Rapper

=== Fan Fave Video ===
Arkells — "Knocking at the Door"

- Zeds Dead (featuring Rivers Cuomo & Pusha T) — "Too Young"
- A Tribe Called Red (featuring Yasiin Bey, Narcy & Black Bear) — "R.E.D."
- Jessie Reyez — "Shutter Island"
- Grimes (featuring Janelle Monáe) — "Venus Fly"

=== Fan Fave Artist or Group ===
Justin Bieber

- The Weeknd
- Drake
- Shawn Mendes
- Alessia Cara

=== Fan Fave International Artist or Group ===
Niall Horan

- Ed Sheeran
- Katy Perry
- Lorde
- Beyoncé

=== Fan Fave Much Creator ===
YouTwoTV

- AmandaRachLee
- Jaclyn Forbes
- Candace Leca
- Mike on Much
