= 2016 iHeartRadio MuchMusic Video Awards =

Annual edition of the awards show

2016 iHeartRadio Much Music Video Awards
- Date: June 19, 2016
- Location: 299 Queen Street West, Toronto, Canada
- Country: Canada
- Hosted by: Gigi Hadid
- Preshow hosts: Chloe Wilde; Jus Reign; Jillea
- Website: http://mmva.muchmusic.com

Television/radio coverage
- Network: Much, CTV, Vrak

The 2016 iHeartRadio Much Music Video Awards (commonly referred to as the iHeartRadio MMVAs) were held on June 19, 2016 outside 299 Queen Street West in Toronto, Ontario, and hosted by Gigi Hadid.

The 2016 edition was co-branded with iHeartRadio, an online radio service with no Canadian terrestrial presence; earlier in the year, sister division Bell Media Radio had reached a licensing agreement to operate a Canadian version of the service owned by U.S. radio conglomerate iHeartMedia. The co-branding was meant to "further elevate the MMVAs internationally" as part of efforts to bring Bell-owned content into the U.S. via iHeartRadio.

During the broadcast several artists paused to acknowledge the Orlando nightclub shooting that had taken place a week earlier, including singer Nick Jonas who dedicated his award to those involved.

== Performances ==
Artist(s)	Song(s)
Pre-show
Coleman Hell	"2 Heads"
Ruth B	"Lost Boy"
Main show
Macklemore & Ryan Lewis with Lilly Singh and Amber Rose	"Dance Off"
Alessia Cara	"Wild Things"
Hailee Steinfeld; Shawn Hook	"Sound of Your Heart" "Rock Bottom" (medley)
Hedley	"Lose Control"
Tegan and Sara	"Boyfriend"
James Bay	"Let It Go"
Desiigner	"Panda"
Shawn Mendes	"Treat You Better"
July Talk	"Push + Pull"
Nick Jonas	"Close" (Live from Queen Street West)
Fifth Harmony	"Work from Home"

== Presenters ==
- Amber Rose
- Lilly Singh (IISuperwomanII)
- SonReal
- Hailey Baldwin
- Alx Veliz
- Sofia Carson
- Lucy Hale
- Shay Mitchell
- Ashley Benson
- Nash Grier
- Jus Reign
- Marianas Trench
- Robbie Amell
- Scott Helman
- Shemar Moore
- Tyler Posey
- Bethany Mota

== Nominees ==
The full list of nominees were announced on May 18, 2016.

=== Video of the Year ===
- Alessia Cara – "Here"
- Belly (featuring The Weeknd) – "Might Not"
- Drake – "Hotline Bling"
- Grimes – "Flesh without Blood"
- Shawn Mendes & Camila Cabello – "I Know What You Did Last Summer"

=== Best Post Production ===
- Kaytranada – "Lite Spots"
- Majid Jordan – "Every Step Every Way"
- Naturally Born Strangers – "Jameson Ave"
- Pup – "Dark Days"
- Purity Ring – "Heartsigh"

=== Best EDM/Dance Video ===
- DVBBS – "White Clouds"
- Grandtheft (featuring Lowell) – "Quit This City"
- Keys N Krates (featuring Katy B) – "Save Me"
- Thugli – "Sic Em"
- Zeds Dead (featuring Memorecks) – "Collapse 2.0"

=== Best Director ===
- Drake – "Hotline Bling" (Director: Director X)
- Grimes – "Flesh without Blood" (Director: Claire Boucher)
- Majid Jordan – "Something About You" (Director: Common Good)
- Kalle Mattson – "Avalanche" (Director: Philip Sportel)
- Young Empires – "The Gates" (Director: Amos LeBlanc)

=== Best Pop Video ===
- Alessia Cara – "Here"
- Coleman Hell – "2 Heads"
- Hedley – "Lose Control"
- Shawn Hook – "Relapse"
- Shawn Mendes & Camila Cabello – "I Know What You Did Last Summer"

=== Best Rock/Alternative Video ===
- City and Colour – "Wasted Love"
- Metric – "The Shade"
- Monster Truck – "Don't Tell Me How to Live"
- The Sheepdogs – "I'm Gonna Be Myself"
- The Strumbellas – "Spirits"

=== Best Hip-Hop Video ===
- Belly (featuring The Weeknd) – "Might Not"
- Drake – "Hotline Bling"
- Jazz Cartier – "The Valley/Dead or Alive"
- John River – "Get Down"
- SonReal – "Whoa Nilly"

=== Best MuchFACT Video ===
- Belly (featuring The Weeknd) – "Might Not"
- Humans – "Water Water"
- Majid Jordan (featuring Drake) – "My Love"
- SonReal – "Whoa Nilly"
- Young Empires – "The Gates"

=== iHeartRadio International Artist of the Year ===
- Adele – "Hello"
- James Bay – "Let It Go"
- Nick Jonas – "Close"
- Rihanna – "Work"
- Selena Gomez – "Hands to Myself"
- Sia – "Cheap Thrills"
- Taylor Swift – "Bad Blood"
- Zayn – "Pillowtalk"
- Ariana Grande – "Dangerous Woman"
- Kanye West – "Only One"

=== Most Buzzworthy Canadian ===
- Alessia Cara – "Here"
- Drake – "Hotline Bling"
- Justin Bieber – "What Do You Mean?"
- Shawn Mendes – "Stitches"
- The Weeknd – "Can't Feel My Face"

=== Most Buzzworthy International Artist or Group ===
- Adele – "Hello"
- Fifth Harmony – "Work from Home"
- Hailee Steinfeld – "Rock Bottom"
- Macklemore & Ryan Lewis – "Downtown"
- Nick Jonas – "Close"
- Rihanna – "Work"
- Selena Gomez – "Hands to Myself"
- Sia – "Cheap Thrills"
- Taylor Swift – "Bad Blood"
- Zayn – "Pillowtalk"

=== Best New Canadian Artist ===
- Alessia Cara – "Here"
- Coleman Hell – "2 Heads"
- Dan Talevski – "Knock Me Off My Feet"
- Jazz Cartier – "Wake Me Up When It's Over"
- Ria Mae – "Clothes Off"

=== iHeartRadio International Duo or Group ===
- Coldplay – "Adventure of a Lifetime"
- Disclosure – "Magnets"
- Fifth Harmony – "Work from Home"
- Jack Ü – "Where Are Ü Now"
- Macklemore & Ryan Lewis – "Downtown"
- Major Lazer – "Powerful"
- One Direction – "Drag Me Down"
- Tame Impala – "Let It Happen"
- The Chainsmokers – "Roses"
- Twenty One Pilots – "Stressed Out"

=== iHeartRadio Canadian Single of the Year ===
- Alessia Cara – "Here"
- Coleman Hell – "2 Heads"
- Justin Bieber – "Sorry"
- Shawn Mendes – "Stitches"
- The Weeknd – "Can't Feel My Face"

=== Fan Fave Video ===
- Alessia Cara – "Here"
- Drake – "Hotline Bling"
- Shawn Mendes & Camila Cabello – "I Know What You Did Last Summer"
- Grimes – "Flesh without Blood"
- Hedley – "Lose Control"

=== Fan Fave Artist or Group ===
- Drake
- Justin Bieber
- Shawn Mendes
- The Weeknd
- Alessia Cara

=== Fan Fave International Artist or Group ===
- Adele
- Zayn
- Taylor Swift
- Macklemore & Ryan Lewis
- Fifth Harmony

=== Fan Fave Vine Musician ===
- Ruth B
- Marks Records
- Jeffrey Miller
- Rajiv Dhall
- Kenzie Nimmo
