= Can't Slow Down (Hedley song) =

Single by Hedley

from the album Hello
- Released: August 25, 2016
- Recorded: Studio City, CA (Van Howes Studio)
- Genre: Electropop
- Length: 3:36
- Label: Universal Canada
- Songwriters: Jacob Hoggard; Jarrett Holmes; Brian Howes
- Producers: Brian Howes; Jacob Hoggard; Jason "JVP" Van Poederooyen; Jarrett Holmes (add'l)

Hedley singles chronology
"Lose Control" (2016)	"Can't Slow Down" (2016)	"Love Again" (2017)

Music video
- "Can't Slow Down" on YouTube

"Can't Slow Down" is a song recorded by Canadian pop rock band Hedley for their sixth studio album Hello (2015). It was written by lead singer Jacob Hoggard with Jarrett Holmes and Brian Howes, and was produced by Howes, Hoggard, and Jason "JVP" Van Poederooyen with additional production from Holmes. The song was first released to digital retailers on October 2, 2015 as the record's first promotional single and was later serviced to radio on August 25, 2016 as the fourth and final official single.

Upon its initial release, "Can't Slow Down" entered the Canadian Hot 100 at number 94. After its release as a single, it reached a new peak of 43 and has also impacted multiple airplay charts. It has been described as the band's "most personal" song to date.

== Content ==
"Can't Slow Down" is an electropop song with a "chilled vibe" and "deeply personal" lyrics that describe "the dark side of fame." Inspired by Hoggard's struggle to balance his personal relationships with his celebrity status, the song is "the most personal, honest look at the realities of life in the fast lane," according to a statement Hoggard made to Postmedia Network. Toronto Paradise magazine labelled the song a "stand out track" on the album for being highly produced without coming across as "too try hard."

== Commercial reception ==
"Can't Slow Down" debuted at number 94 on the Canadian Hot 100 chart dated October 24, 2015 from digital sales and streaming following the song's promotional release. Following its release as a single, the song reached a new peak of 43 on the chart dated January 21, 2017. It has surpassed the peak position of previous single "Lost Control" at adult contemporary radio, reaching 11 on the Canada AC chart and earning the band their second AC top-20 from Hello. "Can't Slow Down" has also reached 11 and 8 on the Canada CHR/Top 40 and Canada Hot AC airplay charts, respectively, so far.

== Music video ==
An audio visualizer for the song was uploaded to the band's Vevo account on October 2, 2015 accompanying the song's digital release. The official music video for "Can't Slow Down", co-directed by Jacob Hoggard and Matt Leaf, premiered August 31, 2016. Hoggard told ET Canada that the video represents "a contrast between two worlds" and that this duality is meant to convey "what life can be like being pulled from opposite ends, needing to be a lot of different things a lot of the time." This video marks the third collaboration between Hoggard and Leaf, following the videos for "Heaven in Our Headlights" and "Hello". An acoustic video for the song premiered September 23, 2016.

== Awards and nominations ==
Awards and nominations for "Can't Slow Down"
Year	Organization	Award	Result	Ref(s)
2017	MuchMusic Video Awards	Best Pop Video of the Year	Nominated	

== Credits and personnel ==
Credits adapted from Hello album liner notes.

Recording

- Recorded and mixed at Van Howes Studio (Studio City, CA)
- Mastered at Sterling Sound (New York City, NY)

Personnel

- Vocals – Jacob Hoggard
- Background vocals – Chris Crippin, Brian Howes, Tommy Mac, Dave Rosin
- Guitars – Jacob Hoggard, Brian Howes, Dave Rosin
- Bass – Tommy Mac
- Drums – Chris Crippin
- Piano – Jacob Hoggard
- Keyboards – Jacob Hoggard, Jason "JVP" Van Poederooyen
- Programming – Jacob Hoggard, Jason "JVP" Van Poederooyen
- Percussion – Jacob Hoggard
- Production – Jacob Hoggard, Brian Howes, Jason "JVP" Van Poederooyen
  - Additional production – Jarrett Holmes
- Songwriting – Jacob Hoggard, Jarrett Holmes, Brian Howes

== Charts ==
=== Weekly charts ===
Weekly chart performance for "Can't Slow Down"
Chart (2015–17)	Peak position
Canada (Canadian Hot 100)	43
Canada AC (Billboard)	11
Canada CHR/Top 40 (Billboard)	11
Canada Hot AC (Billboard)	8

=== Year-end charts ===
Year-end chart performance for "Can't Slow Down"
Chart (2017)	Position
Canada AC (Mediabase)	28
Canada CHR/Top 40 (Mediabase)	41
Canada Hot AC (Mediabase)	14

== Release history ==
Country	Date	Format	Label	Ref.
Canada	October 2, 2015	Digital download	Universal Canada	
Canada	August 25, 2016	Radio airplay	Universal Canada	
