= Lovish =

Studio album by Library Voices
- Released: November 6, 2015
- Recorded: An old funeral home
- Genre: Indie pop, indie rock
- Length: 42:23
- Label: Nevado Music
- Producer: Library Voices

Library Voices chronology
For John (2014)	Lovish (2015)

Lovish is the third full-length studio album by Regina, Saskatchewan indie pop collective Library Voices. The album was released on November 6, 2015 as their second on Toronto-based independent label Nevado Music. Lovish continues a guitar-heavy, more traditional rock sound that the band used on 2014's For John EP and moves further away from the synthpop of earlier releases.

== About ==
Library Voices' first two albums, 2010's Denim on Denim and 2011's Summer of Lust, garnered the band acclaim for its "exuberant and lushly arranged pop music." The band changed direction with 2014's For John EP, which focused on a guitar-driven rock sound as a tribute to a deceased friend. With Lovish, Library Voices again emphasised guitars but continued to use keyboards and horns to mellow out their pop sound. Prior to recording the album, guitarist and generally lead vocalist Carl Johnson was assaulted and seriously beaten after leaving a club in Regina, suffering severe head injuries and mild brain damage. After extensive recovery, Johnson was able to participate on seven of the songs, with guitarist Brennan Ross singing on the other four.

== Critical and popular reception ==
Jedd Beaudoin of PopMatters gave Lovish seven out of ten stars, finding the band's new sound "a welcome change that suggests greater nuance from a band that has yet to fully capitalize on its commercial potential" and compliments the writing, instrumentation and the hooks in the songs, but noted the last songs were not as strong as the start of the record. The Spill Magazine's Robert Defina called Lovish "darker and far more honest record than its predecessors" and also complemented the instrumentation of the album, noting that "most prominent is a horn section that unexpectedly backs a few tracks but elevates them beyond their simple structures." Overall Defina said that the album "is not the strongest of its kind, but it’s a damn good effort". Laura Stanley of Exclaim! said, "this is Library Voices saying goodbye to their old ways and celebrating their renewed and more powerful sound, even when they're channelling softness."

Lead single "Oh Donna" peaked at number three on CBC Radio 3's Top 30 in November 2015, and "Hey! Adrienne" debuted at number three on the same chart in February 2016.

== Track listing ==
No.	Title	Length
1.	"Oh Donna"	3:56
2.	"Sunburnt in L.A."	3:52
3.	"Slacker"	2:54
4.	"Zzyzx"	3:38
5.	"Hey! Adrienne"	2:44
6.	"The Wild Roar of Love"	4:00
7.	"Escape Artist"	3:57
8.	"Fangs of Love"	2:57
9.	"Death By Small Talk"	4:17
10.	"Bored in Berlin"	3:23
11.	"Every Night"	6:50
Total length:		42:23

== Personnel ==
- Carl Johnson (lead vocals, guitar)
- Michael Dawson (electronics)
- Brennan Ross (lead vocals, guitar, vocals)
- Paul Gutheil (saxophone, percussion, vocals)
- Amanda Scandrett (vocals, keyboards)
- Michael Thievin (drums and percussion)
- Ethan Anderson (bass)
