= Hunting Ghosts (& Other Collected Shorts) =

EP by Library Voices
- Released: August 15, 2008
- Genre: Indie pop
- Length: 20:54
- Label: Young Soul
- Producer: Orion Paradis and Library Voices

Library Voices chronology
Hunting Ghosts (& Other Collected Shorts) (2008)	Denim on Denim (2010)

Hunting Ghosts (& Other Collected Shorts) is the debut release from Regina, Saskatchewan indie pop collective Library Voices. The six-song studio extended play (EP) was released on August 15, 2008 on Young Soul Records. Recorded with up to as many as ten musicians, Hunting Ghosts is described as musically similar to styles of eighties synth pop containing varied influence from pop/punk, indie rock, new age and jazz. Lyrically, the album contains many references to twentieth century authors, situations, and quotations. Hunting Ghosts was nominated for Independent Album of the Year for 2009's Western Canada Music Awards.

== Critical reception and themes ==
Pras Rajagoparan of Exclaim! said Hunting Ghosts sounds like a "multi-decade mash-up of pop styles feels warm, inviting and unrehearsed" and characterized the band's self-described "pop as fuck" sound as "an affable collection of songs that could more accurately be termed 'twee as fuck.'" The New Yorker's Shoko Wagner found that the album "may well appeal to indie music fans with a taste for the lighthearted, and, of course, hip bookworms who can appreciate the group’s eclectic assortment of literary shout-outs," noting literary references in titles like "Kundera On The Dance Floor" and "Things We Stole From Vonnegut's Grave," nods to Milan Kundera and Kurt Vonnegut, respectively. Lyrics also refer to works by said authors, such as The Unbearable Lightness of Being and Slaughterhouse-Five, as well as Franz Kafka.

== Track listing ==
All songs by Library Voices.

No.	Title	Length
1.	"Step Off The Map & Float"	4:10
2.	"Kundera On The Dance Floor"	2:20
3.	"Things We Stole From Vonnegut's Grave"	3:39
4.	"Love In The Age Of Absurdity"	4:00
5.	"The Lonely Projectionist"	4:29
6.	"Hunting Ghosts"	3:16
Total length:		20:54

== Personnel ==
- Carl Johnson (lead vocals, guitar)
- Michael Dawson (guitar, theremin, synths, organ, various others, vocals)
- Brennan Ross (guitar, vocals)
- Eoin Hickey-Cameron (bass guitar)
- Paul Gutheil (saxophone, trumpet, vocals)
- Amanda Scandrett (vocals, keyboards)
- Michael Thievin (drums)
- Karla Miller (microkorg, vocals)
