= Lose Control (Hedley song) =

Single by Hedley

from the album Hello
- Released: March 4, 2016
- Recorded: Studio City, CA (Van Howes Studio)
- Genre: Electropop
- Length: 3:46
- Label: Universal Canada
- Songwriters: Jacob Hoggard; Jarett Holmes; Brian Howes; Jason Van Poederooyen
- Producers: Brian Howes; Jacob Hoggard; Jason "JVP" Van Poederooyen

Hedley singles chronology
"Hello" (2015)	"Lose Control" (2016)	"Can't Slow Down" (2016)

Music video
- "Lose Control" on YouTube

"Lose Control" is a song recorded by Canadian pop rock band Hedley for their sixth studio album Hello (2015). It was written by lead singer Jacob Hoggard with Jarett Holmes, Brian Howes, and Jason "JVP" Van Poederooyen, and was produced by all but Holmes. "Lose Control" was released March 4, 2016, through Universal Music Canada as the album's third official single.

"Lose Control" reached a moderate peak of 37 on the Canadian Hot 100, providing the band their second consecutive top-40 single off Hello, and also reached the top 20 on two airplay formats. In September 2016, it was certified Platinum by Music Canada.

== Release ==
"Lose Control" was serviced to radio on March 4, 2016, as the third single from their sixth studio album, Hello. On May 6, it was announced that the song earned a nomination for Fan Fave Video at the 2016 iHeartRadio MuchMusic Video Awards. Following the group's performance at the award show, the song was re-serviced to radio.

== Chart performance ==
"Hello" debuted at number 89 on the Billboard Canadian Hot 100 chart dated April 16, 2016. The song peaked at number 37 on the Canadian Hot 100 chart dated July 30, 2016. "Lose Control" peaked at numbers 21, 10, and 7, respectively, on the Canada AC, Canada CHR/Top 40, and Canada Hot AC airplay charts. In September 2016, "Lose Control" was certified Platinum by Music Canada, indicating sales of over 80,000.

== Music video ==
A video for "Lose Control" was directed by Lisa Mann, Samy Inayeh and premiered March 21, 2016. Compared to the video for Taylor Swift's 2014 hit "Shake It Off", the video finds the members of Hedley surrounded by female dancers who use the men as props in their ballet-style performances.

== Live performances ==
The band performed "Lose Control" on June 19, 2016, at the 2016 iHeartRadio Much Music Video Awards.

== Awards and nominations ==
Awards and nominations for "Lose Control"
Year	Organization	Award	Result	Ref(s)
2016	MuchMusic Video Awards	Best Pop Video of the Year	Nominated	
2016	MuchMusic Video Awards	Fan Fave Video of the Year	Nominated	

== Credits and personnel ==
Credits adapted from Hello album liner notes.

Recording

- Recorded and mixed at Van Howes Studio (Studio City, CA)
- Mastered at Sterling Sound (New York City, NY)

Personnel

- Vocals – Jacob Hoggard
- Background vocals – Chris Crippin, Brian Howes, Tommy Mac, Dave Rosin
- Guitars – Jacob Hoggard, Brian Howes, Dave Rosin
- Bass – Tommy Mac
- Drums – Chris Crippin
- Piano – Jacob Hoggard
- Keyboards – Jacob Hoggard, Jason "JVP" Van Poederooyen
- Programming – Jacob Hoggard, Jason "JVP" Van Poederooyen
- Percussion – Jacob Hoggard
- Production – Jacob Hoggard, Brian Howes, Jason "JVP" Van Poederooyen
- Songwriting – Jacob Hoggard, Jarett Holmes, Brian Howes, Jason "JVP" Van Poederooyen

== Charts ==
=== Weekly charts ===
Weekly chart performance for "Lose Control"
Chart (2016)	Peak position
Canada (Canadian Hot 100)	37
Canada AC (Billboard)	21
Canada CHR/Top 40 (Billboard)	10
Canada Hot AC (Billboard)	7

=== Year-end charts ===
Year-end chart performance for "Lose Control"
Chart (2016)	Position
Canada (Canadian Hot 100)	91

== Certifications and sales ==
Certifications and sales for "Lose Control"
Region	Certification	Certified units/sales
Canada (Music Canada)	Platinum	80,000^{‡}
^{‡} Sales+streaming figures based on certification alone.
