= Rajiv Dhall =

American singer-songwriter

Rajiv Dhall ਰਾਜੀਵ ਢੱਲ
- Born: Rajiv Dhall; 1992 (age 33–34); Cincinnati, Ohio, U.S.
- Occupations: Singer, songwriter, musician, producer
- Years active: 2011–present

Rajiv Dhall (born 1992) is an American singer-songwriter and multi-instrumentalist. On December 18, 2010, he started uploading videos to his YouTube channel "TwentyForSeven" which had over 1,000,000 subscribers and over 120 million views.

== Biography ==
Rajiv Dhall was born the son of Indian Punjabi-origin father and Caucasian mother. He attended Plymouth-Canton Educational Park. While Dhall was in high school, he and his friends formed the emo-pop outfit TwentyForSeven (consisting of Dhall, (vocals/guitar), Matt Pastor (bass/keys/vocals), Blake Hayes (guitar/vocals), Tony Bastianelli (Synth/Programming) and Corey DeLuca (drums)) and spent several years fronting the band with some success.

== Career ==
His band appeared on E's, Opening Act competition in 2012 and as a surprise, they got a chance to be the opening act for Gym Class Heroes.

He later started uploading solo cover songs to YouTube which eventually gave him a large online following. In 2015, he released his version of the One Direction song "Just Can't Let Her Go", which entered the Top 200 of the iTunes songs chart.

After his success on YouTube, his friend Andrew Bazzi introduced him to Vine, a short-form video sharing service where users can share six-second-long looping video clips. He was nominated for "Best Vine Musician" in the Seventh Annual Shorty Awards, losing out to Shawn Mendes. He was also nominated for the 2015 MTV Woodie Awards.

In 2016, he was nominated for the 2016 iHeartRadio Much Music Video Awards in the "Fan Fave Vine Musician" category and he won.

He also made videos showcasing the top songs of 2012, 2013, 2015, 2016, 2017, 2018 and 2020.

== Awards and nominations ==
Year	Ceremony	Award	Nominated	Result
2015	7th Annual Shorty Awards	Vine Musician	Rajiv Dhall	Nominated
2016	iHeartRadio Much Music Video Awards	Fan Fave Vine Musician	Rajiv Dhall	Won
