= Summer of Lust =

Studio album by Library Voices
- Released: August 23, 2011
- Genre: Indie pop
- Length: 32:44
- Label: Nevado Records
- Producer: Orion Paradis and Library Voices

Library Voices chronology
Denim on Denim (2010)	Summer of Lust (2011)	For John (2014)

Summer of Lust is the second full-length album by Regina, Saskatchewan indie pop collective Library Voices. The album was released on August 23, 2011 as the first for the band on Toronto-based independent label Nevado Records. The first single from the album, "Generation Handclap," peaked at number 23 on AMC's Canada Alternative Rock chart.

== Critical reception ==
Alex Young of Consequence of Sound gave the album a B and a positive review, stating that Summer of Lust "provides everything you could hope for from indie pop: heartfelt lyrics, oddly titled songs...and big instrumentation, featuring keyboards, horns, and strings" and complementing the size of the band, for this album it was seven members, saying that "the other instruments differentiate Library Voices from their contemporaries." Jedd Beaudoin of PopMatters gave the album seven out of ten stars, saying that "The outfit’s literate, dance-inducing songs are informed by ‘60s pop but aren’t wholly married to that time; there are also elements of loud ‘80s rock meant for stadiums, and some that should have been in stadiums."

== Track listing ==
No.	Title	Length
1.	"Intro"	0:05
2.	"If Raymond Carver Was Born in the 90's"	3:03
3.	"Generation Handclap"	3:58
4.	"Reluctant Readers Make Reluctant Lovers"	3:04
5.	"Que Sera Sarah"	2:45
6.	"Traveller's Digest"	3:16
7.	"Be My Juliette Gréco, Paris 1949"	3:04
8.	"The Prime Minister's Daughter"	3:03
9.	"Me, Myself, and ID"	3:12
10.	"Anthem for a New Canadia"	3:15
11.	"Regina I Don't Want to Fight"	3:32
12.	"Outro"	0:20
Total length:		32:44

== Personnel ==
- Carl Johnson – lead vocals, guitar
- Michael Dawson – guitar, theremin, synths, organ, various others, vocals
- Brennan Ross – guitar, vocals
- Eoin Hickey-Cameron – bass guitar
- Paul Gutheil – saxophone, percussion, vocals
- Amanda Scandrett – vocals, keyboards
- Michael Thievin – drums and percussion
