= For John =

EP by Library Voices
- Released: June 14, 2014
- Studio: Soulsound Studios, Regina, Saskatchewan
- Genre: Indie rock
- Length: 30:38
- Label: Prairie Shag Recordings
- Producer: Orion Paradis and Library Voices

Library Voices chronology
Summer of Lust (2011)	For John (2014)	Lovish (2015)

For John is the second extended play album from Regina, Saskatchewan indie pop collective Library Voices. The album was released on June 14, 2014 on the band's own Prairie Shag Recordings. For John is a radical departure in style and sound for Library Voices. Previous albums featured clean production with a heavy emphasis on synthpop, whereas For John is stripped down, lo-fi guitar rock in style of early FM radio.

== About ==
For John is a tribute to John Farrell, a Buffalo, New York disc jockey and influential supporter of FM album-oriented rock music in the Buffalo area during the 1970s, who died in March 2013. Farrell was an early and avid proponent of Library Voices; he did not drive a car but would take a bus from Buffalo to locations across southern Ontario to see the band perform. On hearing of Farrell's death, the band's lyricist Michael Dawson said that he and songwriter Carl Johnson "instinctively wanted to release some material dedicated to and inspired by John."

== Critical and popular reception ==
Two tracks from the album charted on CBC Radio 3's Top 30: "Windsor Hum" spent three weeks at number one in the winter of 2014, and "John Farrell Buffalo" reached number three and spent several weeks on the chart in the fall of 2014.

Noting the radical change from the Library Voices' previous work, Noah Siegel of New Canadian Music said the album "could be from an entirely different act altogether. Gone are the potent hooks and shimmering, glossy production, swapped for hazy vocals, fuzzy guitars, and a lo-fi sheen" and found that For John "all works though, still replete with their signature clever lyrics, and as a neat slice of Canadiana rock." Exclaim!'s Peter Sanfilipo found variety in the songs, saying "Like changing frequencies on a wood-paneled broadband radio, the collective jumps from one style to another" and finding that "Each song is catchy and heartfelt".

== Track listing ==
No.	Title	Length
1.	"Some Mezcal Morning"	5:55
2.	"Space Age"	2:34
3.	"Antimatters of the Heart"	5:00
4.	"John Farrell Buffalo"	6:07
5.	"Snowshoe Training Might Save Your Life"	4:12
6.	"Use Your Allusion I & II"	3:19
7.	"Windsor Hum"	3:22
Total length:		30:38

== Personnel ==
- Carl Johnson (lead vocals, guitar)
- Michael Dawson (electronics)
- Brennan Ross (guitar, vocals)
- Eoin Hickey-Cameron (bass guitar)
- Paul Gutheil (saxophone, percussion, vocals)
- Amanda Scandrett (vocals, keyboards)
- Michael Thievin (drums and percussion)
