= The Maddigans =

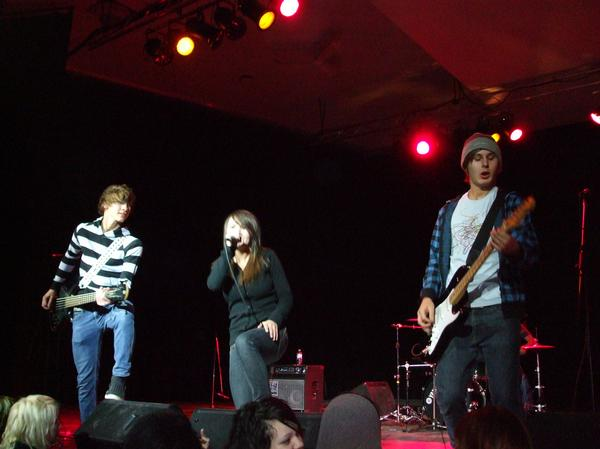
- The Maddigans performing live in 2008

Background information
- Origin: Edmonton, Alberta, Canada
- Genres: Pop rock; pop punk
- Years active: 2008–present
- Label: Independent
- Members: Trisha Watson; Benn Kimmis; Seb Sanders; Mike Hawman
- Past members: Thaddeus Lake; Alex Porro; Eric Paone; Kevin Vos
- Website: Official page on Facebook

The Maddigans are a Canadian pop rock band from Edmonton, Alberta. The band are best known for their DIY touring schedule, including playing 19 countries without a booking agent. They have also released 3 EPs and one studio album.

== History ==
The Maddigans formed in 2008 in Edmonton, Alberta, consisting of Trisha Watson on vocals, Benn Kimmis on drums and Eric Paone on guitar. All of the members had been friends since junior high school and had performed in other bands together.

The band released their debut EP Say It Loud in 2009. They later added bassist Thaddeus Lake to the band and began to tour alongside western Canadian bands such as The Kick Off, The Perfect Trend, and Acres of Lions. In 2010 they released another EP Way To Start This and toured across Canada with Everyone Everywhere. During this tour Eric Paone left the band. Later that year the band added guitarist Seb Sanders as a replacement.

In 2011, the band toured the US for the first time and played Canadian Music Week in Toronto. This was followed by Ontario dates with Set It Off. In November that year, bassist Thaddeus Lake was killed in a car accident by a drunk driver.

In 2012, the band released their EP Love Vs Passion, their first with Sanders. It was dedicated it to their former bassist Thaddeus Lake. By this time the band had already done 8 Canadian tours and 2 US tours, covering "more kilometers than any [other] Edmonton band over the last 5 years". The release was immediately followed by their first UK tour. The band would go on to tour the UK 6 times and Europe twice over the next 2 years. In 2016, they added Mike Hawman to the band as a bassist. They also released their first album No Place Like Here, which was debuted on Alternative Press. Three songs from the release received regular airplay on Idobi Radio.

== Style ==
Circuit Sweet described the band as having a "weighty mix of pop punk and pop rock".

== Band members ==
Current

- Trisha Watson – lead vocals
- Benn Kimmis – drums
- Seb Sanders – guitars, backing vocals
- Mike Hawman – bass

Former

- Thaddeus Lake – bass
- Alex Porro – bass
- Eric Paone – lead guitar
- Kevin Vos – bass

Touring

- Michael Racioppo – bass

== Discography ==
=== Studio albums ===
List of studio albums
| Title | Album details |
|---|---|
| No Place Like Here | Released: April 4, 2016; Format: CD, CS, DL, LP; Label: Self-released |

=== Extended plays ===
List of extended plays
| Title | Album details |
|---|---|
| Love Vs Passion | Released:September 9, 2012; Label: Self-released; Format: CD, DL |
| Way To Start This | Released: July 1, 2010; Label: Self-released; Format: CD, DL |
