= Denim on Denim (album) =

Studio album by Library Voices
- Released: April 13, 2010
- Studios: Soulsound Studios, Regina, SK
- Genre: Indie pop
- Length: 43:55
- Label: Young Soul
- Producers: Orion Paradis and Library Voices

Library Voices chronology
Hunting Ghosts (& Other Collected Shorts) (2008)	Denim on Denim (2010)	Summer of Lust (2011)

Denim on Denim is the second release and first full-length album by Regina, Saskatchewan indie pop collective Library Voices. The album was released on April 13, 2010 on Young Soul Records. Denim on Denim was recorded with up to eight different musicians playing in band, and continued the guitar-and-keyboards synthpop sound of their first release, 2008's Hunting Ghosts (& Other Collected Shorts) EP. Denim on Denim was nominated for Independent Album of the Year in the 2010 Western Canadian Music Awards.

== Critical reception ==
Josh Lucas of Vancouver's The Georgia Straight compared Library Voices's sound on the album to The New Pornographers, describing it as "giddy indie pop layered with electric guitars, analogue keyboards, and multipart vocal harmonies" and said that the band "knows its way around a hook but isn’t afraid to offset its bubblegum sweetness with unexpected bursts of noise" on the record. Exclaim!'s Jessica Lewis made similar observations, saying that on Denim on Denim Library Voices "employ the usual rock band system, but the touch of horns, emphasis on the drums and quirky, mellow lyrics work well for them," and Mike Angus of Vue Weekly agreed with both, saying that "the album is still teeming with keys, horns, synths and shimmering tremolo guitars over fuzzed out feedback loops."

== Track listing ==
No.	Title	Length
1.	"Drinking Games"	4:37
2.	"Insider Trading (On Outsider Art)"	3:23
3.	"Haunt This House"	4:23
4.	"Party Like It's 2012"	3:18
5.	"Write Me A Myth"	2:46
6.	"Bookish"	2:47
7.	"Bodies Of Fiction"	3:42
8.	"Model City"	2:25
9.	"End Times"	4:12
10.	"Family Night"	3:39
11.	"Balloon Menagerie"	3:58
12.	"Hello Cruel World"	4:39
Total length:		43:55

== Personnel ==
- Carl Johnson (lead vocals, guitar)
- Michael Dawson (guitar, theremin, synths, organ, various others, vocals)
- Brennan Ross (guitar, vocals)
- Eoin Hickey-Cameron (bass guitar)
- Paul Gutheil (saxophone, percussion, vocals)
- Amanda Scandrett (vocals, keyboards)
- Michael Thievin (drums and percussion)
- Karla Miller (microkorg, vocals)
