= Flesh Without Blood =

Single by Grimes

from the album Art Angels
- Released: October 26, 2015
- Recorded: 2015
- Genre: Pop
- Length: 4:24
- Label: 4AD
- Songwriter(s): Grimes
- Producer(s): Grimes

Grimes singles chronology
"Entropy" (2015)	"Flesh Without Blood" (2015)	"Kill V. Maim" (2016)

Music video
- "Flesh Without Blood" on YouTube

"Flesh Without Blood" is a song by Canadian singer, songwriter and music producer Grimes, released on October 26, 2015, as the lead single from her fourth studio album, Art Angels (2015). The same day, Grimes released the "Flesh Without Blood/Life in the Vivid Dream" video to YouTube, a double music video featuring "Flesh Without Blood" and "Life in the Vivid Dream", another song on Art Angels.

== Background ==
Grimes revealed via her Twitter account that "Flesh Without Blood" is a song about a platonic friendship she had with a woman. Grimes noted how, prior to stating her authorial intent, the press had assumed that the song was about a heterosexual relationship. She saw this as an example of how "the press genders my lyrics" and said that she no longer writes songs about love. She also described it as a song about "being really disappointed with someone who you really once truly admired".

One of the characters from the music video for "Flesh Without Blood" is named Rococo Basilisk, a reference to the thought experiment Roko's basilisk and the Rococo art movement. Grimes said that the character was "doomed to be eternally tortured by an artificial intelligence, but she's also kind of like Marie Antoinette."

== Critical reception ==
Billboard ranked "Flesh Without Blood" at number 15 on its year-end list for 2015, writing:

There were several otherworldly pop bangers on Grimes' Art Angels, but we're glad she decided to let this stratospheric kiss-off kick off the album cycle. [Grimes] kept us guessing in the album's long gestation period, sharing "Go," an EDM banger she'd written for Rihanna, and then admitting she'd scrapped an entire album's worth of material. In the end, she delivered the pop some of her fans were craving, without sacrificing the weirdness that made her a cult star. "Flesh Without Blood" is that in a nutshell––a sky-scraping hook pulled out of unintelligible vocals, served over an underbelly of humming guitar.

Rolling Stone ranked "Flesh Without Blood" at number 15 on their year-end list of the 50 best songs of 2015. The Village Voice ranked "Flesh Without Blood" at number 12 on their annual year-end critic's poll. Time named "Flesh without Blood" the 10th best song of 2015. Pitchfork Media named "Flesh Without Blood" the 7th best song and 18th best music video of 2015. The song also came in at #71 on the annual Triple J Hottest 100 for 2015.

== Charts ==
=== Weekly charts ===
Chart (2015–2016)	Peak position
Belgium (Ultratip Bubbling Under Flanders)	84
Canada Rock (Billboard)	46
UK Indie (OCC)	27
US Hot Dance/Electronic Songs (Billboard)	18
US Hot Rock & Alternative Songs (Billboard)	23

=== Year-end charts ===
Chart (2016)	Position
US Hot Dance/Electronic Songs (Billboard)	95

== Uses in media ==
This song was used in the Mr. Robot Season 4 Episode 3 "403 Forbidden".
