= Hello (Hedley album) =

Studio album by Hedley
- Released: November 6, 2015
- Recorded: 2014–15
- Studios: Van Howes Studio (Los Angeles, CA); The Synagogue (Los Angeles, CA)
- Genres: Pop rock; electropop
- Length: 40:23 (standard); 50:27 (deluxe)
- Label: Universal Music Canada
- Producers: Jacob Hoggard; Brian Howes; Jon Levine; Jason Van Poederooyen; Nolan Sipe

Hedley chronology
Wild Life (2013)	Hello (2015)	Cageless (2017)

Singles from Hello
- 1. "Lost in Translation" Released: September 8, 2015; 2. "Hello" Released: October 9, 2015; 3. "Lose Control" Released: March 4, 2016; 4. "Can't Slow Down" Released: August 25, 2016

Hello is the sixth studio album recorded by Canadian pop rock band Hedley. It was released via Universal Music Canada on November 6, 2015. It debuted atop the Billboard Canadian Albums Chart, becoming the group's first chart-topper, and has since spawned two top-40 singles, "Hello" and "Lose Control".

== Background ==
Following their Wild Live tour, a headlining tour in support of their fifth studio album Wild Life, the group began taking ideas and concepts of what they had on the road and turned it into an album. The album's main theme is about not losing hope and to keep moving forward, a message lead singer Jacob Hoggard finds, "almost as a necessity." Songs such as the title track, "Back to Basics" and "Very First Time" follow this theme, according to guitarist Dave Rosin. Spending nine months writing the album, Hoggard described Hello as an honest record, finding him in a vulnerable place and the group stepping outside of their comfort zone. He also said writing the album was "that light bulb moment" and hoped that it would connect with people. Musically, the album is described as electropop, long departing from their pop punk roots presented on their earlier records.

In support the album, the band embarked on the Hello World Tour across Canada from April to May 2016, with support from Carly Rae Jepsen and Francesco Yates. The tour was a success, selling just under 125,000 tickets for the 27 concert dates, with an estimated gross of $7.5 million.

== Composition and release ==
Jacob Hoggard is credited as a writer, record producer, and creative director for the album. Other producers include Brian Howes and Jason Van Poederooyen. Canadian songwriter Ryan Stewart, known for his work with Carly Rae Jepsen and Suzie McNeil, also co-wrote five tracks on the album.

The album became available for pre-order on iTunes on September 8, 2015, in conjunction with the digital release of "Lost in Translation". Ahead of the album's release, the group released an album trailer in September 2015. The group also performed the title track at the We Day event in early October 2015. Hello was released in digital and physical formats, in both a standard and deluxe edition, and was also available as a vinyl box set. All versions were scheduled for release in Canada on November 6, 2015, via Universal Music Canada. The album was released in the US through Capitol Records on November 6, 2015. The album debuted at number one on the Canadian Albums Chart and sold 14,500 copies in its first week.

== Singles ==
"Lost in Translation" was released on September 8, 2015, as the lead single from the album. It was released to radio on September 15. The song failed to enter the Billboard Canadian Hot 100, becoming their first single to miss the chart since it was established in 2007. It has, however, impacted the Canada CHR/Top 40 and Canada Hot AC airplay charts monitored by Billboard through Nielsen BDS Radio, reaching number 31 and number 47, respectively.

The title track, "Hello", was released October 9, 2015, as the second official single. It was promoted to Canadian adult contemporary radio on October 12, in lieu of "Lost in Translation" as the lead single for that format. The song peaked at number 20 on the Billboard Canadian Hot 100. It also reached number 9 on the Canada AC chart, number 8 on the Canada CHR/Top 40 and number 2 on the Canada Hot AC chart.

"Lose Control" was serviced to Canadian radio on March 4, 2016, as the album's third official single. The song peaked at number 37 on the Canadian Hot 100. It also peaked at numbers 21, 10, and 7, respectively, on the Canada AC, Canada CHR/Top 40, and Canada Hot AC airplay charts.

"Can't Slow Down" was released to iTunes on October 2, 2015, as the first promotional single from the album. An official audio visualizer was uploaded to the band's Vevo account on the same day. On August 25, 2016, it was serviced to radio as the record's fourth official single. The song reached number 43 on the Canadian Hot 100. It also peaked at number 11 on both the Canada AC and Canada CHR/Top 40 charts and at number 8 on the Canada Hot AC chart.

== Critical reception ==
The album was met with positive reviews from music critics. Keith Sharp of The Music Express stated, "The record production is spot on with current recording trends melding hook-filled lyrics with dance-oriented arrangements in a format that is irresistible to modern day radio formats." Though he found that the lyrics were "nothing profound," he said "Hedley has a way of connecting with their audience and this 6th release is just another positive step along the way towards achieving mass appeal." Jenia Schukov of Confront Magazine wrote, "this band prides themselves in doing things differently. Each album holds a distinctly different sound and explores a wide variety of genres. This is no different for their sixth studio album Hello."

== Track listing ==
Hello – Standard edition
No.	Title	Writer(s)	Producer(s)	Length
1.	"Lost in Translation"	Jacob Hoggard, Jarett Holmes, Alleson Sheldan	Brian Howes, Hoggard, Jason "JVP" Van Poederooyen, Jarett Holmes^{[a]}	2:48
2.	"Hello"	Hoggard, Howes, Poederooyen	Hoggard, Howes, Poederooyen	4:11
3.	"Quit"	Hoggard, Howes, Poederooyen	Hoggard, Howes, Poederooyen	3:30
4.	"Can't Slow Down"	Hoggard, Holmes, Howes	Hoggard, Howes, Poederooyen, Holmes^{[a]}	3:36
5.	"Very First Time"	Hoggard, Ryan Stewart	Hoggard, Howes, Poederooyen	3:46
6.	"I Will"	Hoggard, Stewart	Hoggard, Howes, Poederooyen	3:51
7.	"Man Killer"	Hoggard, Jon Levine, Anjulie Persaud	Hoggard, Levine	3:37
8.	"Lose Control"	Hoggard, Holmes, Howes, Poederooyen	Hoggard, Howes, Poederooyen	3:46
9.	"Alive"	Hoggard, Stewart	Hoggard, Nolan Sipe	3:59
10.	"Back To Basics"	Hoggard, Sipe, Stewart	Hoggard, Sipe	3:35
11.	"The Knife"	Hoggard, Holmes, Sheldan	Hoggard, Howes, Poederooyen	3:44
Total length:				40:23

Hello – Deluxe edition (bonus tracks)
No.	Title	Writer(s)	Length
12.	"Sympathy"	Hoggard, Matt Squire, Steve Tippeconnic	3:04
13.	"Kids"	Hoggard, Holmes, Howes	3:24
14.	"Fighting Chance"	Hoggard, Sipe, Stewart	3:36
Total length:			50:27

Notes

- ^{^[a]} signifies an additional record producer

== Credits and personnel ==
Credits adapted from Hello album liner notes.

Hedley

- Vocals, acoustic guitar, piano, keyboards, percussion – Jacob Hoggard
- Guitars, background vocals – Dave Rosin
- Bass, background vocals – Tommy MacDonald
- Drums, background vocals – Chris Crippin

Recorded and engineered at

- Vancouver, British Columbia (Kaplankrunch Studios)
- Studio City, Los Angeles, CA (Van Howes Studios, The Synagogue)

Mixed at

- New York City, NY (Sterling Sound)

Performance credits

- Additional vocals – Allie Sheldan (Track 1)
- Background vocals – Brian Howes (Tracks 1–6, 8)
- Guitar – Brian Howes
- Piano, clavinova – James Jannetty
- Bass, drum programming, keyboards, keyboard programming, piano, Rhodes, wurli – Jon Levine
- Keyboards – Jason Van Poederooyen
- Guitar – Jon Sosin
- Keyboards – Ryan Stewart

Production

- A&R – Shawn Marino, Darren Gilmore
  - Booking – The Feldman Agency
- Art director – Garnet Armstrong
- Creative director – Jacob Hoggard
- Engineers – Ben Kaplan, Jason Van Poederooyen, Nolan Sipe
  - Assistant engineer – Dan Piscina
- Manager – Dale Matheson Carr-Hilton Labonte LLP
  - Managing organization – Watchdog Management
- Mastering – Ted Jensen
- Mixer – Jason Van Poederooyen
- Record producers – Jacob Hoggard, Brian Howes, Jon Levine, Jason Van Poederooyen, Nolan Sipe
  - Additional producers – Jarett Holmes
- Programming – Jacob Hoggard
  - Additional programming – Jason Van Poederooyen
- Songwriters – Jacob Hoggard, Jarett Holmes, Brian Howes, Jon Levine, Anjulie Persaud, Jason Van Poederooyen, Alleson Sheldan, Nolan Sipe, Ryan Stewart
- Photographer – Raina + Wilson
- Photo illustration – Brad Pickard

== Charts ==
=== Weekly charts ===
Weekly chart performance for Hello
Chart (2015)	Peak position
Canadian Albums (Billboard)	1

=== Year end charts ===
Year-end chart performance for Hello
Chart (2016)	Position
Canadian Albums (Billboard)	35

== Certifications ==
Certifications and sales for Hello
Region	Certification	Certified units/sales
Canada (Music Canada)	Platinum	80,000^{‡}
^{‡} Sales+streaming figures based on certification alone.
