= Hello (Hedley song) =

Single by Hedley

from the album Hello
- Released: October 9, 2015
- Recorded: Studio City, CA (Van Howes Studio)
- Genre: Pop rock
- Length: 4:11
- Label: Universal Canada
- Songwriters: Jacob Hoggard; Brian Howes; Jason Van Poederooyen
- Producers: Brian Howes; Jacob Hoggard; Jason "JVP" Van Poederooyen

Hedley singles chronology
"Lost in Translation" (2015)	"Hello" (2015)	"Lose Control" (2016)

Music video
- "Hello" on YouTube

"Hello" is a song recorded by Canadian pop rock band Hedley for their sixth studio album of the same name (2015). It was written and produced by lead singer Jacob Hoggard with Brian Howes and Jason "JVP" Van Poederooyen. "Hello" was released October 9, 2015, through Universal Music Canada as the album's second official single.

"Hello" placed in the top 10 on multiple adult and pop radio formats, including a career-high peak of two on the Billboard Canada Hot AC airplay chart. The song peaked at 20 on the Billboard Canadian Hot 100, the group's only top-20 single from Hello.

== Background ==
After the release of 2013's Wild Life, which produced four consecutive top-40 singles, Hedley returned to the studio to record new music in 2014. They had been writing for nine months when they came up with the idea for "Hello", and "all of a sudden we thought, 'Oh man, we've got to share this," Hoggard said in an interview with CBC. They credit the song with inspiring the feel of the album.

On September 8, 2015, Hello was made available for pre-order and "Lost in Translation" was released as the lead single. The song performed poorly, becoming the group's first promoted single to not enter the Canadian Hot 100 since the chart's 2007 inception, and stalled in the mid-30s on the pop charts. A month later, on October 9, 2016, the band ceased promotion of "Lost in Translation" and released "Hello" as the second single.

== Composition and lyrics ==
"Hello" was written and produced by Jacob Hoggard, Brian Howes and Jason Van Poederooyen. The track is described as pop rock, with its lyrics being intimate and personal. The song is about wishing you could have a do over and make things right, offering a sign of hope and redemption.

== Chart performance ==
"Hello" debuted at number 46 on the Billboard Canadian Hot 100 chart dated October 31, 2016 and was the week's highest debut. The same week, the song debuted at number 22 on the Canadian Digital Songs component chart and was likewise the highest debut. The song peaked at number 20 on the Canadian Hot 100 chart dated November 28, 2016; it was the week's greatest gainer in digital sales and reached its peak position of 6 on the Digital Songs chart. "Hello" reached a peak position of two on the Billboard Canada Hot AC chart dated March 5, 2016. It also peaked at number 9 and 8, respectively, on the Canada AC and Canada CHR/Top 40 airplay charts.

== Music video ==
The accompanying music video for "Hello" was co-directed by Jacob Hoggard and Matt Leaf, and premiered October 28, 2015 through MTV Canada. It features a love story between two elementary school kids and also contains shots of the band performing inside a school gymnasium.

== Live performances ==
"Hello" served as the set opener for Hedley's 2016 Hello World Tour.

== Credits and personnel ==
Credits adapted from Hello album liner notes.

Recording

- Recorded and mixed at Van Howes Studio (Studio City, CA)
- Mastered at Sterling Sound (New York City, NY)

Personnel

- Vocals – Jacob Hoggard
- Background vocals – Chris Crippin, Brian Howes, Tommy Mac, Dave Rosin
- Guitars – Jacob Hoggard, Brian Howes, Dave Rosin
- Bass – Tommy Mac
- Drums – Chris Crippin
- Piano – Jacob Hoggard
- Keyboards – Jacob Hoggard, Jason "JVP" Van Poederooyen
- Programming – Jacob Hoggard, Jason "JVP" Van Poederooyen
- Percussion – Jacob Hoggard
- Production – Jacob Hoggard, Brian Howes, Jason "JVP" Van Poederooyen
- Songwriting – Jacob Hoggard, Brian Howes, Jason "JVP" Van Poederooyen

== Charts ==
=== Weekly charts ===
Weekly chart performance for "Hello"
Chart (2015–16)	Peak position
Canada (Canadian Hot 100)	20
Canada AC (Billboard)	9
Canada CHR/Top 40 (Billboard)	8
Canada Hot AC (Billboard)	2

=== Year-end charts ===
Year-end chart performance for "Hello"
Chart (2016)	Position
Canada (Canadian Hot 100)	94
