= Fresh Snow =

Canadian instrumental post-rock band

Fresh Snow are a Canadian instrumental post-rock band from Toronto, Ontario. They are most noted for their 2013 album I, which was a longlisted nominee for the 2014 Polaris Music Prize.

Formed in 2010, the band consists of guitarist and keyboardist Tim Condon, bassist and keyboardist Andy Lloyd, guitarist Brad Davis and drummer Jon Maki. They first united to play a show at Duffy's Tavern in Toronto; the following year they released their first recording, a 7" split single with METZ. Strongly influenced by krautrock, the band took their name from Neu!'s song "Neuschnee 78".

They released I in 2013, and followed up with the EP WON in 2015 and their second full-length album ONE in 2016.
