= Library Voices =

Canadian indie pop band

- Origin: Regina, Saskatchewan, Canada
- Genres: Indie pop
- Years active: 2008–present
- Label: Nevado Records
- Members: Paul Gutheil; Ethan Anderson; Michael Dawson; Carl Johnson; Brennan Ross; Amanda Scandrett; Mike Thievin
- Website: www.libraryvoices.com

Library Voices are a Canadian indie pop band from Regina, Saskatchewan. Formed in 2008 as a ten-piece group of musician friends, they have released two EPs and three full-length albums. The current band members include Paul Gutheil, Ethan Anderson, Michael Dawson, Carl Johnson, Brennan Ross, Amanda Scandrett, and Mike Thievin.

The band features such instruments as horns, strings, and an accordion.

== Reception ==
The band was noticed by The New Yorker and by Spin. The alternative newsweekly Now, in a favourable review of the band's EP Hunting Ghosts (& Other Collected Shorts), described the track "Step Off the Map & Float" as "the EP's clear standout, one of the year's catchiest and cutest indie rock singles." Vue Weekly wrote, "there's a curious pop-anthem flavouring to Hunting Ghosts that makes the sound gel more than you might expect." The Calgary Herald's critic wrote of the band's album, prior to its release, "Even in its current rough, unfinished form, it's obvious Library Voices have come up with one of 2009's finest records of the year."

Their EP was nominated for Independent Album of the Year at the 2009 Western Canadian Music Awards, and their album Denim on Denim was nominated for the same award in 2010. Their second full-length album, 2011's Summer of Lust, was preceded by the lead single "The Prime Minister's Daughter", which responded to Prime Minister Stephen Harper's controversial assertion that "ordinary people don't care about the arts" by imagining a future scenario in which his daughter Rachel falls in love with a musician.

== Discography ==
=== Albums ===
- 2008: Hunting Ghosts (& Other Collected Shorts) (EP)
- 2010: Denim on Denim
- 2011: Summer of Lust (August 2011)
- 2014: For John (EP)
- 2015: Lovish

=== Singles ===
Year	Song	Chart peak	Album
Year	Song	CAN Alt	Album
2011	"Generation Handclap"	23	Summer of Lust
"—" denotes a release that did not chart.
