= Art Angels =

2015 studio album by Grimes

Studio album by Grimes
- Released: November 6, 2015
- Recorded: 2013–2015
- Genres: Synth-pop; dance-pop; art pop; indie pop; electropop
- Length: 49:37
- Label: 4AD
- Producer: Grimes

Grimes chronology
Visions (2012)	Art Angels (2015)	Miss Anthropocene (2020)

Singles from Art Angels
- 1. "Flesh Without Blood" Released: October 26, 2015; 2. "Kill V. Maim" Released: March 4, 2016

Art Angels is the fourth studio album by Canadian musician Grimes. It was digitally released on November 6, 2015, through 4AD, and in physical formats on December 11. Boucher began planning the record in 2013 as the follow-up to her third studio album, Visions; however, for unknown reasons, she scrapped most of the material from these sessions and began a new set of recordings in 2014. The track "Realiti", which came from the earlier recordings, was released as a demo in early 2015.

Art Angels has been described as being more accessible than Boucher's previous albums while retaining her experimental influences. The album features guest appearances by Taiwanese rapper 潘PAN and American singer Janelle Monáe. The album spawned two singles—"Flesh Without Blood" and "Kill V. Maim"—as well as music videos for several tracks. Art Angels sold 11,000 copies in its first week, peaking at number 36 in the United States. The album was released to widespread critical acclaim and was ranked by several publications as one of the best albums of 2015.

== Background ==
Boucher's constant touring in 2013 for her 2012 album, Visions, almost led to a physical collapse by the end of the year, bringing her to a point where she recalled "putting a hand up and grabbing a piece of [her] hair, and [she] could just pull [her] hair out". She also became tired of how the music industry ignored her technical abilities, who would focus on her being a "female musician" and having a "girly voice"; she responded to these generalisations with "yeah, but I'm a producer and I spend all day looking at fucking graphs and EQs and doing really technical work". When media outlets began running her Tumblr posts as headlines, she wrote a post on her blog about her misrepresentation in the media and the sexism she had faced in the music industry, declaring "i dont want my words to be taken out of context. i dont want to be infantilized because i refuse to be sexualized [...] im tired of the weird insistence that i need a band or i need to work with outside producers [sic]". Being in an "unstable" and "beyond exhausted" state, along with her frustration toward the media, caused her to consider ending the Grimes project and solely writing songs for other artists, or at least putting her life in the public eye on hold. Her experiences, however, eventually began to strengthen her conviction in her being a solo artist. In a 2015 feature by The Fader, Boucher stated that while working in music studios "there [were] all these engineers [that didn't let her] touch the equipment [...] and then a male producer would come in, and he'd be allowed to do it". These incidents, which she described as sexist, left her "disillusioned with the music industry" and made her "realize what [she] was doing is important".

== Recording and production ==
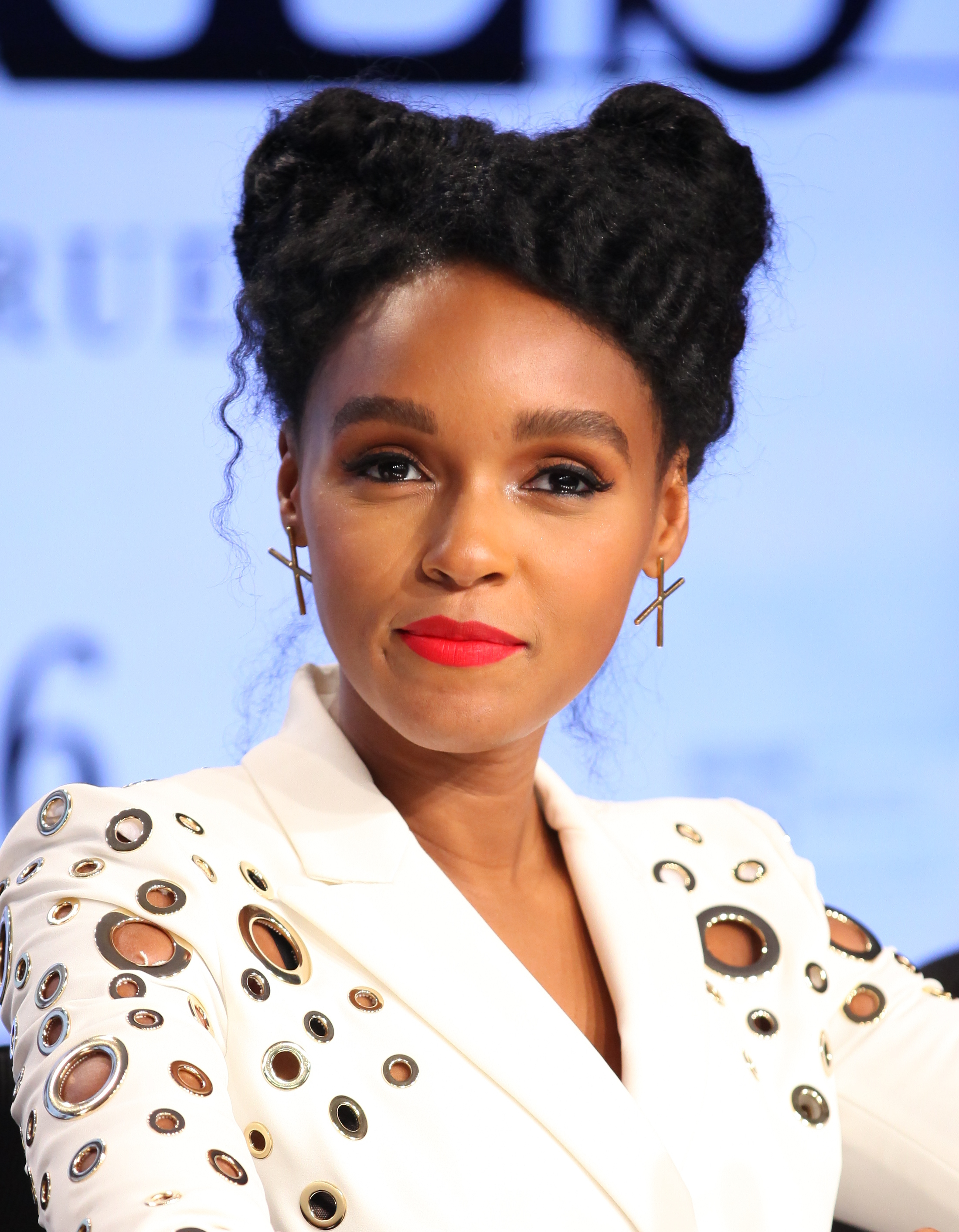
American singer Janelle Monáe contributed vocals to the track "Venus Fly".

"Laughing and Not Being Normal"
"Laughing and Not Being Normal" epitomises Boucher's use of real instruments on Art Angels—including the violin—which she learned to play while recording the album.

"Scream"
"Scream" features lead vocals from Taiwanese rapper 潘PAN and additional screaming from Boucher.

"Flesh Without Blood"
One of the less experimental pop songs on Art Angels, "Flesh Without Blood" is the album's lead single and highest-charting song.

Musically, the album has been described as pop, synth-pop, dance-pop, art pop, indie pop, and electropop. Rolling Stone described the album as a "[move toward] an off-kilter guitars-and-beats sound," and also stated that the album "uses rock sounds in a really different context." Boucher produced and engineered all of the tracks on the album alone. She began using Ableton Live after recording Visions entirely in GarageBand and also learned how to play the guitar, drums, keys, ukulele, and violin to explore new musical directions on Art Angels. Realizing it was "too much pressure" to pay per hour to work in a professional studio, the album was recorded by Boucher in her home studio in Los Angeles, California.

By 2014 Boucher had produced "hundreds of songs" for her next album, most of which were not included on Art Angels. She described the recording of these tracks as "this period where I had no way of dealing with anything, so I was writing these really depressing songs, and nothing was fun at all". Aside from the tracks being too gloomy, Boucher also rejected the tracks she had made during this time because they were not enough of a sonic departure from Visions. Boucher's 2014 single "Go", recorded during these sessions, was originally written for the Barbadian singer Rihanna; however, after Rihanna turned down the track, Boucher released it as a "surprise" under her Grimes alias. The negative response to the single from fans, who believed Boucher was "pandering to the radio", led media outlets to report that this was the reason she had started over the recording of her new album. Boucher stated this was false and commented that "Go" and the other tracks she had cut were not from a complete album; they were only songs which had not made it onto Art Angels. She later stated that she would consider releasing the archived material for free sometime in the future.

== Release ==
On March 8, 2015, Boucher released a music video for the demo version of her song "Realiti" as a gift to her fans. "Realiti" was produced during the scrapped recording sessions for Art Angels and not intended to be included on the final version of her fourth album. Boucher stated that the demo version which she released was "not mixed or mastered" as she had "lost the [song's] Ableton file". Despite Boucher regarding the demo as "a bit of a mess", "Realiti" was well received by critics and fans, which led her to consider including a new version of the song on the final release of Art Angels. When the track listing for Art Angels was announced, a new version of "Realiti" appeared on the CD and digital release and the demo version was included as a bonus track on the CD edition only.

Boucher shared the title and cover artwork for Art Angels on social media networks on October 19, 2015 and announced that a new music video would be released the following week. On October 26, 2015, Boucher revealed that her new album would be available digitally on November 6, 2015, with releases in physical formats on December 11 in the same year. To accompany the announcement, Boucher released her self-directed "Flesh Without Blood/Life in the Vivid Dream" music video, a digital single for "Flesh Without Blood" and individual artwork for each track on Art Angels. "Scream" was released as a promotional single on October 29, 2015. Boucher also directed a video for "Kill V. Maim" with her brother Mac Boucher which was released on January 19. "Kill V. Maim" was released on March 4, 2016 as the second single from Art Angels. On May 9, 2016, Boucher released another co-directed music video for "California", using an alternate mix of the song. On October 5, 2016, Boucher released self-directed music videos for four songs from the album: "Butterfly", "World Princess Part II", "Scream", and "Belly of the Beat", as part of The Acid Reign Chronicles, a long form video project shot on her phone while on tour. On February 2, 2017, Boucher released a music video for "Venus Fly", starring the song's featured artist Janelle Monáe along with Boucher, who also directed the video.

Art Angels debuted at number one on Billboard's Top Alternative Albums chart with first-week sales of 11,000 copies, earning Boucher her first number one on the chart. As of February 2016, the album had sold 50,000 copies in the United States. The album also peaked at numbers two and 36 on the Independent Albums and Billboard 200 charts, respectively. The album debuted at number 31 on the UK Albums Chart, selling 2,964 copies in its first week. Upon the album's release on CD five weeks later, it re-entered the UK chart at number 59 with 4,193 copies sold.

== Critical reception ==
Professional ratings
Aggregate scores
Source	Rating
AnyDecentMusic?	8.0/10
Metacritic	88/100
Review scores
Source	Rating
AllMusic	4/5 stars
The A.V. Club	A−
The Daily Telegraph	5/5 stars
Exclaim!	5/5 stars
The Independent	4/5 stars
The Line of Best Fit	6/10
NME	4/5
Pitchfork	8.5/10
Rolling Stone	3.5/5 stars
Spin	8/10

Art Angels received widespread acclaim from critics. At Metacritic, which assigns a normalized rating out of 100 to reviews from mainstream publications, the album received an average score of 88, based on 32 reviews. Corbin Reiff from The A.V. Club called it "slick and gritty, fun and funny, and horrifying and grotesque all at once" and said "it will also make you shake your ass like nothing else". He also highlighted the track "Kill V. Maim" as holding "the full weight of Grimes' abilities as both a producer and singer". In Billboard, Rob Tannenbaum praised Art Angels as "a marvel of meticulous, even obsessive home-studio recording, uncompromised by bandmates or collaborators". Clash magazine's Maya Rose Radcliffe deemed it "the truest representation of Grimes we've heard yet: Art Angels is boundary pushing, it's listenable and it's Boucher's most ambitious and most consistent work to date" and commended the production of the album as the "one thing that does tie it all together". Although referring to Art Angels as "simultaneously [Boucher's] most accessible and her least personal body of work", Consequence also said it exemplified her artistry, being "performative, maximalist, joyful, and broad".

DIY's El Hunt found Art Angels "impossible to resist", possessing an "instant, limb-grabbing appeal". Cam Lindsay from Exclaim! said it was "worth every second of the wait" and hailed the album as "a complete record that's everything pop should be in 2015: utterly uncompromising, imaginative and, somehow, universally accessible". Writing for NME, Barry Nicholson dismissed notions that Boucher had "sacrificed some of what made her seem so alien when 4AD debut Visions emerged" by "embracing the pop orthodoxy", and commented that "she's still laughing and not being normal, only this time, it's all the way to the bank". Reviewing for Pitchfork, Jessica Hopper deemed the album "evidence of Boucher's labor and an articulation of a pop vision that is incontrovertibly hers, inviting the wider world in", while calling Boucher "a human zeitgeist, redrawing all the binaries and boundaries by which we define pop music and forcing us to come along".

In a less enthusiastic review for The Observer, Kitty Empire stated "packed as it is with all this goodness, Art Angels fails to comprehensively blow your mind" and "ultimately, Grimes has not reinvented the pop wheel, she's just driven it off road a little". Similarly, The Line of Best Fit gave the album an average review and wrote that "on Art Angels, we hear that high art experimentation fall into mainstream territory with only fleeting moments of brilliance". In an interview with Cultured magazine in April 2019, Grimes called the album "a piece of crap", stating: "I feel like people really misread it and it feels like a stain on my life."

=== Year-end and decade-end lists ===
Art Angels was voted by Robert Christgau the fifth best album of 2015 in his ballot for The Village Voice's annual Pazz & Jop critics poll.

Publication	Accolade	Rank	Ref.
The A.V. Club	The 15 Best Albums of 2015	4	
Billboard	The 25 Best Albums of the Year	3	
Consequence of Sound	The 50 Best Albums of 2015	3	
Exclaim!	Exclaim!'s Top 20 Pop & Rock Albums	1	
Fact	The 50 Best Albums of 2015	5	
The Guardian	The 100 Best Albums of the 21st Century	46	
The New York Times	The Best Albums of 2015 (by Jon Pareles)	3	
NME	NME's Albums of the Year 2015	1	
Paste	The 50 Best Albums of 2015	24	
Pitchfork	The 50 Best Albums of 2015	3	
Pitchfork	The 200 Best Albums of the 2010s	11	
Rolling Stone	Rob Sheffield's Top 20 Albums of 2015	2	
Slant Magazine	The 25 Best Albums of 2015	3	
Spin	The 50 Best Albums of 2015	26	
Spin	The 25 Best Pop Albums of 2015	5	
Stereogum	The 50 Best Albums of 2015	1	
Stereogum	The 100 Best Albums Of The 2010s	3	

== Track listing ==
All tracks are written by and produced by Grimes, except where noted.

No.	Title	Writer(s)	Length
1.	"Laughing and Not Being Normal"		1:48
2.	"California"		3:18
3.	"Scream" (featuring 潘PAN)	Grimes; Pan Wei-Ju	2:20
4.	"Flesh Without Blood"		4:25
5.	"Belly of the Beat"		3:26
6.	"Kill V. Maim"		4:06
7.	"Artangels"		4:07
8.	"Easily"		3:03
9.	"Pin"		3:32
10.	"Realiti"		5:07
11.	"World Princess Part II"		5:06
12.	"Venus Fly" (featuring Janelle Monáe)	Grimes; Monáe	3:46
13.	"Life in the Vivid Dream"		1:28
14.	"Butterfly"		4:13
Total length:			49:57

CD edition bonus track
No.	Title	Length
15.	"Realiti" (demo)	4:20

Japanese edition bonus track
No.	Title	Length
16.	"Go" (BloodPop Remix)	3:23

Notes

- "Laughing and Not Being Normal" is stylised in lowercase.
- "Scream" is stylised in all caps.
- "Realiti" is stylised as "REALiTi". It is excluded from vinyl pressings.

Sample credits

- "Butterfly" contains a sample from "Penguin Dancer" co-written by Masayoshi Takanaka and Shu Suzuki.

== Personnel ==
Credits adapted from the liner notes of Art Angels.

- Grimes – vocals, guitars, violin, production, engineering
- Mark "Spike" Stent – mixing
- Geoff Swan – mixing assistance
- Tom Coyne – mastering
- Randy Merrill – mastering

== Charts ==
=== Weekly charts ===
Chart (2015–2016)	Peak position
Australian Albums (ARIA)	30
Belgian Albums (Ultratop Flanders)	82
Canadian Albums (Billboard)	16
Dutch Albums (Album Top 100)	84
Greek Albums (IFPI)	52
Irish Albums (IRMA)	31
Irish Independent Albums (IRMA)	4
Japanese Albums (Oricon)	114
New Zealand Albums (RMNZ)	28
Scottish Albums (Official Charts)	40
UK Albums (Official Charts)	31
UK Independent Albums (Official Charts)	6
US Billboard 200	36
US Top Alternative Albums (Billboard)	1
US Independent Albums (Billboard)	2

=== Year-end charts ===
Chart (2016)	Position
US Independent Albums (Billboard)	34

== Certifications ==
Region	Certification	Certified units/sales
United Kingdom (BPI)	Silver	60,000^{‡}
^{‡} Sales+streaming figures based on certification alone.

== Release history ==
Region	Date	Format	Label	Ref.
Various	November 6, 2015	Digital download; streaming	4AD	
Canada	November 6, 2015	Digital download; streaming	Eerie Organization; Crystal Math	
Various	December 11, 2015	CD; LP; cassette	4AD	
