= Fireproof (Coleman Hell song) =

Single by Coleman Hell

from the album Summerland
- Released: April 29, 2016
- Genre: EDM; folk
- Length: 2:51
- Label: 604; Columbia
- Songwriters: Coleman Hell; Robert Benvegnu
- Producers: Coleman Hell; La+ch

Coleman Hell singles chronology
"2 Heads" (2015)	"Fireproof" (2016)	"Devotion" (2016)

Music video
- "Fireproof" on YouTube

"Fireproof" is a song by Canadian singer-songwriter and musician Coleman Hell. It was released on April 29, 2016, as the second single from his debut studio album, Summerland. The song was a commercial success in Canada, peaking at number 30 on the Canadian Hot 100, as well as reaching the top ten on the Canada CHR/Top 40 Airplay chart. It was certified 2× Platinum by Music Canada in February 2018.

== Background and release ==
Following the success of his breakthrough single "2 Heads", Coleman Hell signed with Columbia Records and announced that a new single would be released sometime in February 2016, in support of his forthcoming debut studio album, scheduled for release later on in the year. In April 2016, Hell revealed "Fireproof" as the next single, released on April 29.

== Composition ==
"Fireproof" was written and produced by Coleman Hell and La+ch, with additional writing from Robert Benvegnu. Musically, the song is described as a blend of EDM with roots and folk, incorporating finger-picked banjo and a harmonica, backed by electronic beats.

== Music video ==
The music video for "Fireproof" was released on September 8, 2016, and was directed by Peter Huang.

== Personnel ==
Credits for "Fireproof" adapted from album's liner notes.

- Coleman Hell – performer, composer, lyricist, producer
- La+ch – keyboards, programming, producer
- Harpdog Brown – harmonica
- Robert Benvegnu – composer
- Jason Dufour – engineer
- Joe Zook – mixing
- Ted Jensen – mastering
- Paul Hammond – assistant engineer

== Charts ==
=== Weekly charts ===
Weekly chart performance for "Fireproof"
Chart (2016)	Peak position
Canada Hot 100 (Billboard)	30
Canada AC (Billboard)	26
Canada CHR/Top 40 (Billboard)	8
Canada Hot AC (Billboard)	13
Canada Rock (Billboard)	46

=== Year-end charts ===
Year-end chart performance for "Fireproof"
Chart (2016)	Position
Canada (Canadian Hot 100)	89

== Certifications ==
Certifications and sales for "Fireproof"
Region	Certification	Certified units/sales
Canada (Music Canada)	2× Platinum	160,000^{‡}
^{‡} Sales+streaming figures based on certification alone.
