= Benjamin Dakota Rogers =

Canadian folk singer-songwriter

- Born: May 16, 1996 (age 29)
- Origin: Mount Pleasant, Brant County, Ontario
- Genres: Folk; Blues; Country
- Occupations: singer-songwriter, violinist, guitarist
- Years active: 2014–present
- Website: www.benjamindakotarogers.com

Benjamin Dakota Rogers is a Canadian folk singer-songwriter. He is most noted for his 2023 album Paint Horse, for which he was a Juno Award nominee for Traditional Roots Album of the Year at the Juno Awards of 2024.

He was previously a two-time Canadian Folk Music Award nominee for Young Performer of the Year, receiving nods at the 10th Canadian Folk Music Awards in 2014 for his debut album Wayfarer, and at the 11th Canadian Folk Music Awards in 2015 for Strong Man's Address to the Circus Crowd.

== Discography ==
- Wayfarer (2014)
- Strong Man’s Address to the Circus Crowd (2015)
- Whisky & Pine (2016)
- Better by Now (2019)
- Paint Horse (2023)
- This Ol' Way (2025)
