= Devours =

Canadian electronic musician

- Also known as: the Golden Age of Wrestling
- Born: Jeff Cancade; 1984
- Origin: Nanaimo, British Columbia, Canada
- Genres: Electronic pop, synth pop, hyperpop
- Occupations: Singer-songwriter, producer, composer
- Years active: 2013-present
- Labels: Artoffact Records, Locksley Tapes, INTRASET, surviving the game, Mint Records

Jeff Cancade, known by the stage name Devours, is a queer Canadian underground electronic musician and record producer based out of Vancouver. They (Note: Cancade uses all pronouns. This article uses they/them for consistency.) also release ambient music using the project name The Golden Age Of Wrestling.

Devours has released 5 full-length albums including the 2024 Polaris Music Prize longlisted album Homecoming Queen. The Golden Age Of Wrestling has released 4 full length albums, including 2024's Scorpion Deadlock which was released by 604 Records' ambient imprint label INTRASET.

Cancade is the owner of the independent record label surviving the game which has released music for both of Cancade's music projects Devours and The Golden Age Of Wrestling.

== Career ==
Originally from Nanaimo, British Columbia, Cancade launched the music project Devours after moving to Vancouver, British Columbia and coming out as gay.

Devours released their debut mixtape Dignity in 2013, before following up with the full-length mixtape 21st & Main in 2014. They then released their first official EP Avalon in 2015, and debut full-length album Late Bloomer on April 15, 2016, via the independent label Locksley Tapes.

In 2018, Devours signed to Artoffact Records, releasing their second album Iconoclast on that label in March 2019. The album was preceded by the advance single "Curmudgeon", and supported with a regional tour of British Columbia and the Pacific Northwest region of the United States.

Devours has been described as "a pseudo-goth, synth-heavy electronic project that occupies a uniquely experimental, queer niche in Vancouver" by The Globe and Mail.

In November 2019, Cancade released the debut single for The Golden Age Of Wrestling. The project's debut album "Tombstone Piledriver" launched in May 2020. The 'glambient' solo project features Cancade with a macho alter ego persona.

In 2021, Cancade launched surviving the game, an independent record label for their music projects, announced before the release of Devours' 3rd full length album Escape from Planet Devours.

Outside of Devours and The Golden Age Of Wrestling, Cancade has also composed music for television and film. Their Devours' 2023 album Homecoming Queen was a longlisted nominee for the 2024 Polaris Music Prize.

Beginning in 2025 with the release of Sports Car Era, Devours has been accompanied on drums by former Japandroids drummer David Prowse during some live shows.

On October 14, 2026 it was announced that Devours had signed with Vancouver-based independent record label Mint Records and will be releasing their next album through the label in 2027.

== Personal life ==
Cancade is genderqueer, and is comfortable with all pronouns.

== Discography ==
Released as "Devours"

- Dignity (2013)
- 21st & Main (2014)
- Avalon (2015)
- Late Bloomer (2016)
- Iconoclast (2019)
- Escape from Planet Devours (2021)
- Homecoming Queen (2023)
- Sports Car Era (2025)

Released as "The Golden Age Of Wrestling"

- Tombstone Piledriver (2020)
- Crossface Chicken Wing (2022)
- Scorpion Deathlock (2024)
- Sweet Chin Music (2026)
