= 2 Heads =

Single by Coleman Hell

from the EP Coleman Hell and the album Summerland
- Released: February 4, 2015
- Length: 3:32
- Label: 604; Columbia
- Songwriters: Coleman Hell; Robert Benvegnu
- Producers: Coleman Hell; La+ch

Coleman Hell singles chronology
| "You Are My Summer" (2014) | "2 Heads" (2015) | "Fireproof" (2016) |

Music video
- "2 Heads" on YouTube

"2 Heads" is a song by Canadian singer-songwriter and musician Coleman Hell. It was released on February 4, 2015, as the lead single from his debut studio album Summerland. It was also included in his self-titled EP released on October 23, 2015. The song was a commercial success in both Canada and the United States, reaching to the top twenty on the Canadian Hot 100 and the and US Hot Rock & Alternative Songs chart. It was certified 5× Platinum by Music Canada and Gold by the Recording Industry Association of America.

== Background ==
After spending a couple of years performing at different venues in Toronto at open mic nights, in hopes of getting noticed, he released the single "2 Heads" on February 4, 2015. The song began receiving radio airplay and was labelled as his "breakthrough" single, which led to him signing with Columbia Records.

== Composition ==
"2 Heads" was written by Coleman Hell and Robert Benvegnu, while production was handled by Coleman Hell and La+ch. Musically, the song is described as EDM and dance, featuring a "plucky banjo and dusty vocals."

On the making of the song, Hell stated, "You need something that's reactive, a really good piece of content whether it's a catchy song, really moving song or crazy video but you need something that provokes a reaction." He also said the song was written about going through a breakup.

== Critical reception ==
Mike Bell of Calgary Herald stated, "The word ubiquitous doesn't even seem to do it justice as the catchy, banjo-fuelled dance floor fave [...] So upbeat and infectious an earworm it is that you'd be forgiven for glossing over the fact it's about heartbreak and disillusionment.

== Chart performance ==
"2 Heads" debuted at number 84 on the Canadian Hot 100. It peaked at number 15 on the chart. The song reached the Canada AC, Canada CHR/Top 40, Canada Hot AC and Canada Rock airplay charts at numbers 7, 4, 3 and 9, respectively. It also reached number five on the US Alternative Airplay chart, spending over 20 weeks on the chart, as well as number 11 on the US Hot Rock & Alternative Songs.

== Awards and nominations ==
Awards and nominations for "2 Heads"
| Year | Organization | Award | Result | Ref(s) |
|---|---|---|---|---|
| 2016 | Canadian Radio Music Awards | Best New Group or Solo Artist: AC | Nominated | |
| 2016 | Canadian Radio Music Awards | Best New Group or Solo Artist: CHR | Nominated | |
| 2016 | Canadian Radio Music Awards | Best New Group or Solo Artist: Modern Rock | Won | |

== Music video ==
The music video for "2 Heads" was released on July 16, 2015 with British-Canadian production designer Danielle Sahota playing Coleman Hell's love interest runaway bride.

== Track listing ==
Digital download
| No. | Title | Length |
|---|---|---|
| 1. | "2 Heads" | 3:32 |

Digital download – remix
| No. | Title | Length |
|---|---|---|
| 1. | "2 Heads" (Your Turn remix) | 3:35 |

== Personnel ==
Credits for "2 Heads" adapted from album's liner notes.

- Coleman Hell – performer, composer, lyricist, producer
- La+ch – keyboards, programming, producer
- Robert Benvegnu – composer
- Michah Dowbak – engineer
- Gene Grimaldi – mastering

== Charts ==
=== Weekly charts ===
Weekly chart performance for "2 Heads"
| Chart (2015–16) | Peak position |
|---|---|
| Canada Hot 100 (Billboard) | 15 |
| Canada AC (Billboard) | 7 |
| Canada CHR/Top 40 (Billboard) | 4 |
| Canada Hot AC (Billboard) | 3 |
| Canada Rock (Billboard) | 9 |
| Sweden Heatseeker (Sverigetopplistan) | 13 |
| US Hot Rock & Alternative Songs (Billboard) | 11 |
| US Rock & Alternative Airplay (Billboard) | 8 |

=== Year-end charts ===
Year-end chart performance for "2 Heads"
| Chart (2015) | Position |
|---|---|
| Canada (Canadian Hot 100) | 71 |
| US Hot Rock Songs (Billboard) | 37 |
| US Rock Airplay (Billboard) | 36 |
| Chart (2016) | Position |
| Canada (Canadian Hot 100) | 54 |
| US Hot Rock Songs (Billboard) | 87 |

== Certifications ==
Certifications and sales for "2 Heads"
| Region | Certification | Certified units/sales |
|---|---|---|
| Canada (Music Canada) | 5× Platinum | 400,000^{‡} |
| United States (RIAA) | Gold | 500,000^{‡} |
^{‡} Sales+streaming figures based on certification alone.
