= Coleman Hell =

Canadian musician (born 1989)

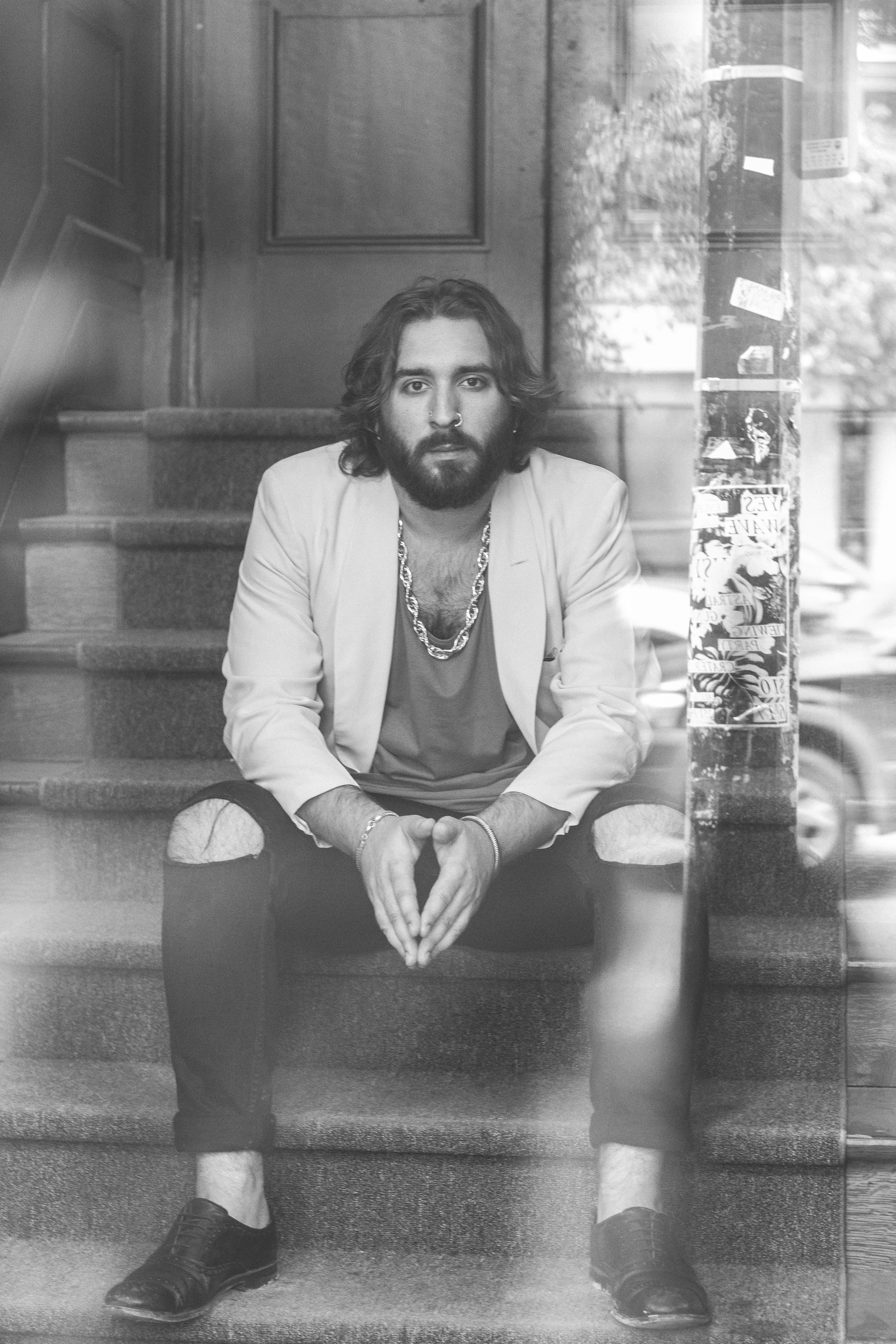
- Hell in 2016 Photograph by Mary Rose

Background information
- Born: Coleman Richard Hell; April 25, 1989 (age 37); Thunder Bay, Ontario, Canada
- Genres: Hip Hop; Indietronica; indie pop; folktronica; EDM
- Occupations: Singer-songwriter; musician; producer
- Instruments: Vocals; keyboards; programming
- Years active: 2012–present
- Labels: Columbia; 604 (Canada)
- Formerly of: Burnz N Hell
- Website: colemanhell.com

Coleman Richard Hell (born April 25, 1989) is a Canadian musician from Thunder Bay, Ontario. He released his breakthrough single, "2 Heads", in February 2015. His debut full-length album, Summerland, was released on October 14, 2016, by 604 Records and Columbia Records.

== Early life ==
Coleman Hell was born and raised in Thunder Bay, Ontario. His mother worked at a record store, where he was exposed to music from Prince and David Bowie, who he attributed to as musical influences. He attended Lakehead University to finish his honours. He later moved to Toronto, explaining that he felt like he "didn't belong and it was hard" for his music to have an impact.

== Career ==
Coleman Hell was briefly a part of the hip-hop duo Burnz N Hell, a musical project he co-formed with Joey Burnz while in high school. The duo spent a year performing live alongside LMFAO, Classified and Swollen Members, among many more, before releasing their first CD Picking Up Girls Is Easy. The duo went viral in 2010, after releasing "Hometown", a tribute to the city they were raised in. After Hell left, he moved to Toronto, where he co-founded the Toronto-based artist collective Sideways, which includes La+ch, Shan Vincent De Paul and Michah. He began performing at a number of different venues in the city on open mic nights, in hopes of getting noticed while also recording his own music. Coleman Hell released his debut single "Glow" in 2012, before releasing a free mixtape called Stark Raving in 2013. It was produced by Coleman Hell, Rob Benvegnu, Michah Dowbak and Brendon McDonald. He released a music video to "Glow". After releasing his second single "You Are My Summer" in 2014, he began receiving favorable attention for his music on Hype Machine and garnered a significant boost in Spotify streams. He signed with 604 Records and released an EP titled Vena on December 9, 2014.

On February 4, 2015, Hell released his breakthrough single "2 Heads". The song peaked at number 15 on the Canadian Hot 100. It also reached number five on the US Alternative Airplay chart, spending over 20 weeks on the chart, as well as number 11 on the US Hot Rock & Alternative Songs. It was certified 5× Platinum by Music Canada and Gold by the Recording Industry Association of America. The success of the song led to him signing with Columbia Records towards the end of 2015. He released the promotional single "Take Me Up" and was featured on Grey's Anatomy. On October 23, 2015, he released a self-titled six track EP, including the song "2 Heads". He earned a nomination for Breakthrough Artist of the Year at the 2016 Juno Awards. "2 Heads" was also nominated for Best New Group or Solo Artist: AC and Best New Group or Solo Artist: CHR and won Best New Group or Solo Artist: Modern Rock at the Canadian Radio Music Awards.

He toured with Robert DeLong in 2015, and Twenty One Pilots and Ria Mae, in 2016. He returned to Thunder Bay, to record his debut album to get "back in touch with the elements." He released a follow-up single titled "Fireproof" on April 29, 2016. He also performed at a handful of festivals in the summer including the Pemberton Music Festival and Calgary Stampede. His debut studio album, Summerland, was released on October 14, 2016. "Devotion" was released on December 16, 2016, as the album's third single. It reached number 23 on the Canadian Albums Chart. The album was nominated at the 2017 Juno Awards for Pop Album of the Year.

On January 31, 2018, he released his first single in two years titled "Manic". The song opens up about his struggles with depression and bipolar disorder. Despite the success of "2 Heads", he experienced a "weird middle ground where you want to move but you can't. It's something I've felt so many times: lying in my bed and feeling so low I can't get up. I want to, but I can't muster the strength." Though he never intended on releasing the song, he felt that "the longer it sat with him, the more he felt there could be value in revealing his struggles." Along with it being inspired by a personal experience, he also said the song was inspired by Lil Uzi Vert's "XO Tour Llif3". He began releasing singles frequently within the upcoming months with "Killer" released on April 24, and "Hold On Me" on May 23. He also began working on his second studio album, with the title revealed to be Topanga, inspired by Topanga Canyon in California. Recorded around the area, Hell felt that the change of scenery "was kind of what initiated things." "Real Me", "Left on Read", "Video", "Twenties", "Mixtape" and "Killer" were confirmed tracks to appear on the album.

In March 2020, Hell announced that the album would be released sometime in the fall, releasing "Show 'Em" as the intended lead single on March 27, in promotion of the album. It was later added to the deluxe edition of the album. On November 9, he released "Real Me" as the lead single from the album. On October 29, 2021, Hell released his second studio album, Topanga, with a deluxe edition of the album released on December 10. His third studio album, Joyride!, was released on May 24, 2024. He performed at the Wake the Giant festival in September 2024.

== Discography ==
=== Studio albums ===
List of studio albums, with selected chart positions and certifications
Title	Album details	Peak chart positions	Certifications
Title	Album details	CAN	Certifications
Summerland	Released: October 14, 2016; Label: 604, Columbia; Formats: CD, digital download	13	MC: Gold
Topanga	Released: October 29, 2021; Label: 604, sideways; Formats: Digital download	—	
Joyride	Released: May 24, 2024; Label: 604, sideways; Formats: Digital download	—	
"—" denotes a release that did not chart.

=== Extended plays ===
List of extended plays, with selected chart positions
Title	Album details	Peak chart positions
Title	Album details	CAN
Vena	Released: December 9, 2014; Label: 604; Formats: Digital download	—
Coleman Hell	Released: October 23, 2015; Label: Columbia, sideways; Formats: CD, digital download	49
"—" denotes a release that did not chart.

=== Mixtapes ===
List of mixtapes with selected details
Title	Album details
807 & Heartbreak (with Burnz N Hell)	Released: 2010; Format: CD
Stark Raving	Released: 2013; Format: Digital download, streaming

=== Singles ===
List of singles as lead artist, with selected chart positions and certifications, showing year released and album name
Title	Year	Peak chart positions								Certifications	Album
Title	Year	CAN	CAN AC	CAN CHR	CAN HAC	CAN Rock	SWE Heat.	US Alt	US Rock	Certifications	Album
"Glow"	2012	—	—	—	—	—	—	—	—		Non-album singles
"You Are My Summer"	2014	—	—	—	—	—	—	—	—		Non-album singles
"2 Heads"	2015	15	7	4	3	9	13	11	5	MC: 5× Platinum; RIAA: Gold	Summerland
"Fireproof"	2016	30	26	8	13	46	—	—	—	MC: 2× Platinum	Summerland
"Devotion"	2016	94	24	28	20	—	—	—	—	MC: Gold	Summerland
"Manic"	2018	—	—	—	—	—	—	—	—		Topanga (Deluxe)
"Killer"	2018	—	—	—	—	—	—	—	—		Topanga (Deluxe)
"Hold on Me"	2018	—	—	—	—	—	—	—	—		Topanga (Deluxe)
"Love Is Blind"	2018	—	—	—	—	—	—	—	—		Non-album single
"Shadows of Your Love"	2019	—	—	—	—	—	—	—	—		Topanga (Deluxe)
"Sadstreet Boys"	2019	—	—	—	—	—	—	—	—		Topanga (Deluxe)
"Left on Read"	2019	—	—	—	—	—	—	—	—		Non-album singles
"Polite"	2019	—	—	—	—	—	—	—	—		Non-album singles
"Get to Know Ya"	2019	—	—	—	—	—	—	—	—		Non-album singles
"Show 'Em"	2020	—	—	—	—	—	—	—	—		Topanga (Deluxe)
"Real Me"	2020	—	—	—	—	—	—	—	—		Topanga
"Come Over"	2020	—	—	—	—	—	—	—	—		Non-album singles
"Hurt" (with La+ch)	2021	—	—	—	—	—	—	—	—		Non-album singles
"Topanga"	2021	—	—	—	—	—	—	—	—		Topanga
"Dancing Around It"	2022	—	—	—	—	—	—	—	—		Joyride!
"Man I Used to Be"	2022	—	—	—	—	—	—	—	—		Joyride!
"Bet!"	2022	—	—	—	—	—	—	—	—		Joyride!
"Save Yourself"	2022	—	—	—	—	—	—	—	—		Joyride!
"Better Days" (with Jocelyn Alice)	2022	—	—	—	—	—	—	—	—		Joyride!
"Good Mood"	2023	—	—	—	—	—	—	—	—		Joyride!
"Motorcycle" (with La+ch)	2023	—	—	—	—	—	—	—	—		Joyride!
"Move" (with Adventure Club)	2025	—	—	—	—	—	—	—	—		Non-album single
"—" denotes singles that did not chart or was not released in that territory.

==== Promotional singles ====
List of promotional singles by Coleman Hell
Year	Title	Album
"Take Me Up"	2015	Coleman Hell
"Thumbalina"	2015	Coleman Hell
"Flowerchild"	2016	Summerland

== Tours ==
Headlining

- North American Fall Tour (2015)
- Canadian Winter Tour (2016)

As a support act

- North American Spring Tour (Twenty One Pilot) (2016)

Festivals

- Pemberton Music Festival (2016)
- Calgary Stampede (2016)
- Firefly Music Festival (2016)
- Wake the Giant Festival (2019, 2024)
