= Cambridge Bay =

Cambridge Bay Iqaluktuuttiaq ᐃᖃᓗᒃᑑᑦᑎᐊᖅ
- Hamlet
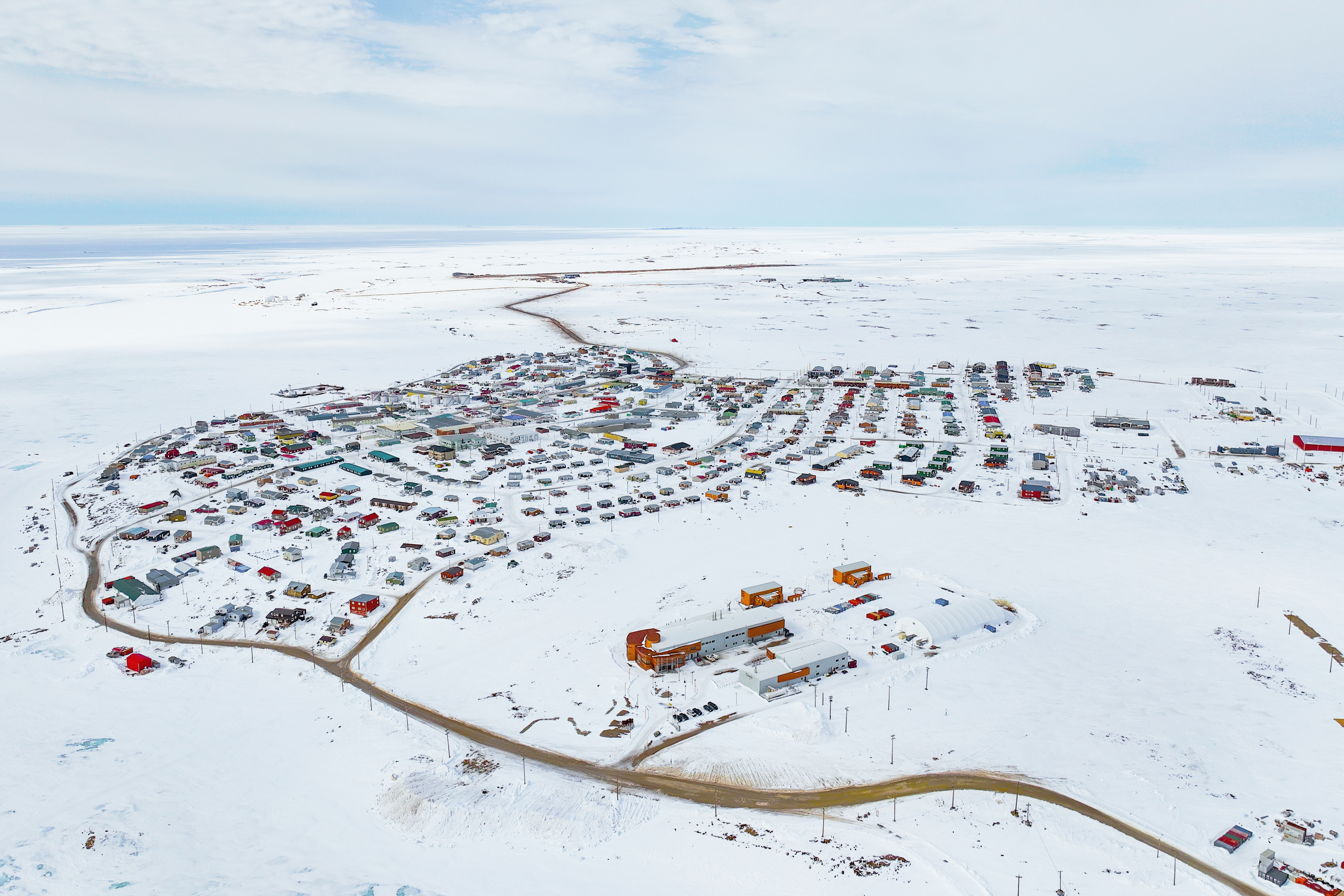
- Southwest-facing aerial view (2023)

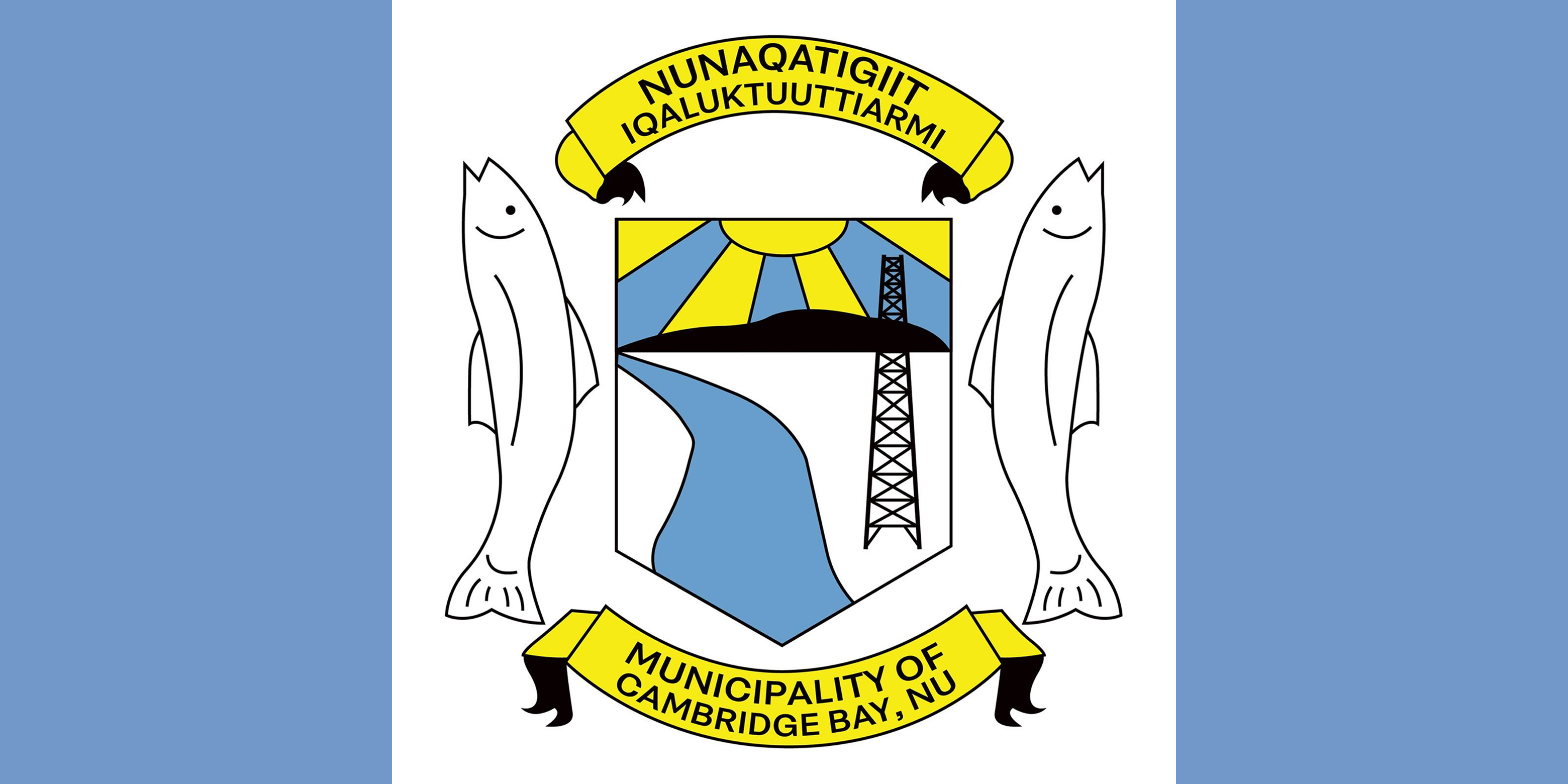
- Flag Coat of arms
- Nickname: Cam Bay
- Location within Nunavut Location within Canada
- Coordinates: 69°06′50″N 105°03′10″W
- Country: Canada
- Territory: Nunavut
- Region: Kitikmeot
- Electoral district: Cambridge Bay
- Settled: 1921
- Incorporated (hamlet): 1 April 1984

Government
  - Mayor: Wayne Gregory
  - Senior Administrative Officer: Jim MacEachern
  - MLA: Fred Pedersen

Area (2021)
  - Total: 195.70 km^{2} (75.56 sq mi)
  - Population Centre: 0.85 km^{2} (0.33 sq mi)
- Elevation: 31 m (102 ft)
- Highest elevation: 183 m (600 ft)
- Lowest elevation: 0 m (0 ft)

Population (2021)
  - Total: 1,760
  - Density: 8.99/km^{2} (23.3/sq mi)
  - Population Centre: 1,403
  - Population Centre density: 1,652.9/km^{2} (4,281/sq mi)
- Time zone: UTC−07:00 (MST)
  - Summer (DST): UTC−06:00 (MDT)
- Postal code: X0B 0C0
- Area code: 867
- Telephone exchange: 983
- GNBC Code: OADAD
- NTS Map: 77D2 Cambridge Bay
- Website: Official site

Cambridge Bay (Inuinnaqtun: Iqaluktuuttiaq Inuktitut: ᐃᖃᓗᒃᑑᑦᑎᐊᖅ; 2021 population 1,760; population centre 1,403) is a hamlet located on Victoria Island in the Kitikmeot Region of Nunavut, Canada. It is the larger of the two settlements on Victoria Island, the other being Ulukhaktok in the Northwest Territories. Cambridge Bay is named for Prince Adolphus, Duke of Cambridge, while the traditional Inuinnaqtun name for the area is Ikaluktutiak (old orthography) or Iqaluktuuttiaq (new orthography) meaning "good fishing place".

The traditional language of the area is Inuinnaqtun and is written using the Latin alphabet rather than the syllabics of the Inuktitut writing system. Like Kugluktuk, Bathurst Inlet and Umingmaktok, syllabics are rarely seen and used mainly by the Government of Nunavut.

Cambridge Bay is the largest stop for passenger and research vessels traversing the Arctic Ocean's Northwest Passage, a disputed area which the Government of Canada claims are Canadian Internal Waters, while other nations state they are either territorial waters or international waters.

== History ==
=== Pre-history ===
The first known people to occupy the area were the Pre-Dorset people, somewhere around 1800 BCE, about 4,000 years ago, and were seal and caribou hunters. The next group to enter the area were a Paleo-Eskimo peoples known as the Dorset, who arrived approximately 500 CE. They were the first known people to have fished for the Arctic char. The last of the Paleo-Eskimo people, who appeared here about 800 CE, were the Tuniit, and evidence of their living quarters can be seen close to Cambridge Bay. The Tuniit, who were known to the Inuit as giants, were taller and stronger than the Inuit, but were easily scared off.

The next group to arrive were the Thule people, ancestors of the modern Inuit, who arrived in the area around 1250 CE from present day Alaska. The Thule people built food caches and stone houses in the area and were noted for their sophisticated tools. Although there is no positive evidence it is suspected that the Thule may have interacted with the Tuniit.

About 500 years ago, around 1500 CE, the modern Inuit made an appearance. Like the Thule they made use of caches, hunted caribou and fished for char. They also hunted seal from the ice in winter and returned to the land in spring. They were also known to make use of inukhuk and built igluit. Although they had no collective name, the various groups of Inuit that made use of native copper for tools have since become known as Copper Inuit and are the same people that Vilhjalmur Stefansson called the Blond Eskimos. The main groups that lived or interacted in the Cambridge Bay area were the Ekalluktogmiut (Iqaluktuurmiutat or Ikaluktuurmiut), Ahiagmiut (Ahiarmiut), the Killinirmuit and the Umingmuktogmiut.

=== European history ===
The first Europeans to reach Cambridge Bay were overland Arctic explorers led by Thomas Simpson in 1839; they were searching for the Northwest Passage and had crossed the sea ice on foot. Another overland expedition led by John Rae reached Cambridge Bay in 1851, and the first ship to reach the bay was HMS Enterprise under Richard Collinson who wintered there in 1852–1853. Both Rae and Collinson were searching for Franklin's lost expedition. Collinson's ship came from the west, having entered the Canadian Arctic via the Bering Strait. This was the furthest east any large ship travelled from the Bering Strait until Henry Larsen's west–east sailing of the Northwest Passage aboard St. Roch in 1941.

Cambridge Bay was the site of Royal Canadian Mounted Police (RCMP) and Hudson's Bay Company (HBC) outposts established during the 1920s. Although at this point most Inuit would have continued the traditional lifestyle, and only visited the area rather than live there permanently. The HBC opened a post here in 1921, later than in most places, and built at the site now called the "old town".

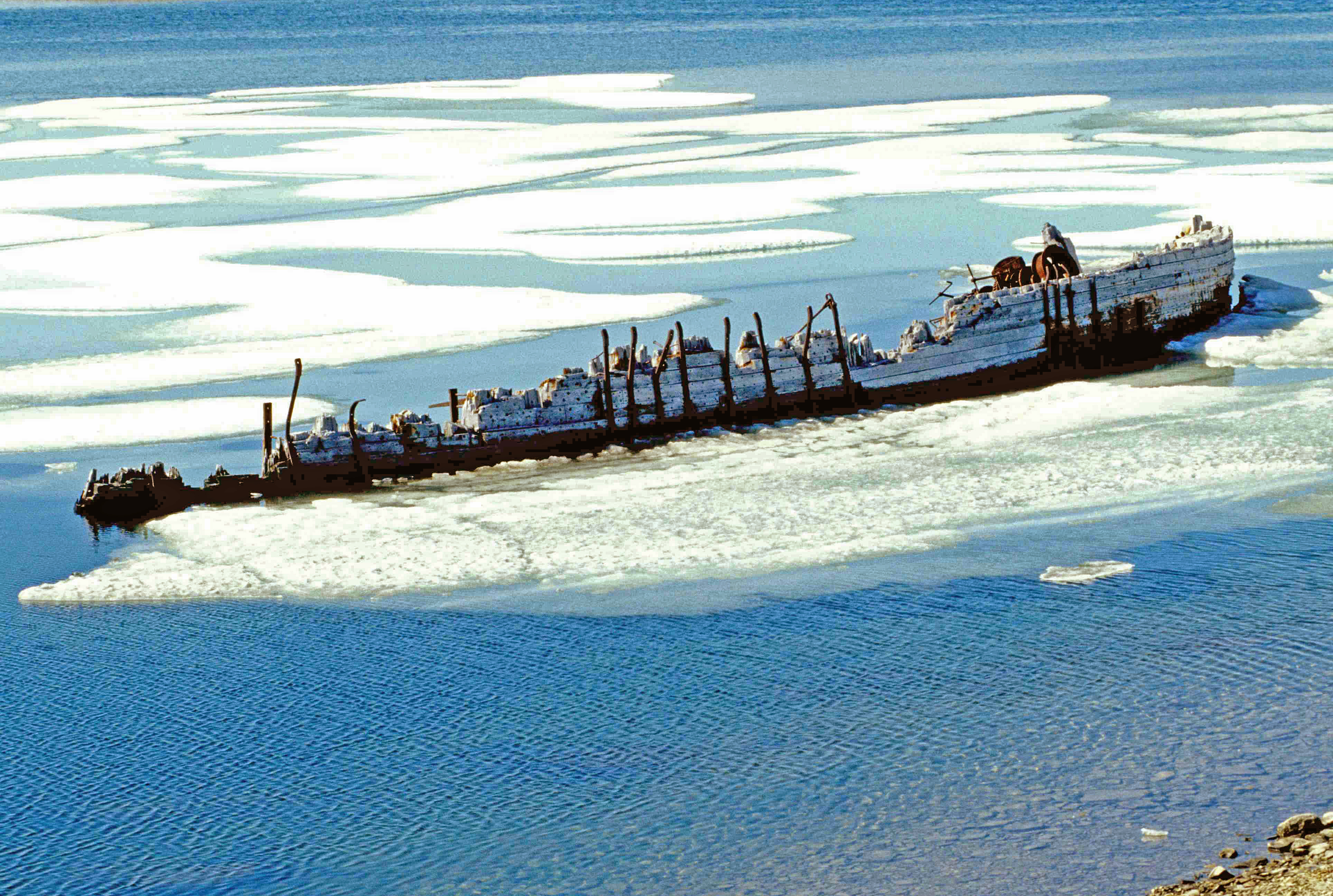
Roald Amundsen's ship Maud at Cambridge Bay prior to being salvaged. This was not the ship in which Amundsen was the first to sail the Northwest Passage; that was the Gjøa.

In 1925 the HBC purchased the historic ship Maud, which they renamed the Baymaud, from the creditors of Norwegian explorer, Roald Amundsen. The ship sailed to the Arctic in 1926 but it became stuck in the winter ice at Cambridge Bay. The Maud was later anchored near the shore and used for various purposes, including the first ever radio weather reports from the Arctic coast. In 1930 the ship sank and, although some material was removed at the time, the ship remained visible for 86 years. A Norwegian plan to salvage the ship and return it to Norway, though initially denied an export permit, was granted on appeal, and was to be carried out in 2014 but was delayed to 2015 due to ice conditions preventing the arrival of salvage equipment until late in the open water season. The planned salvage of 2015 was also delayed, however during the summer of 2016 the Maud was raised and prepared for return to Norway during the summer of 2017, where she will be displayed at a museum in Vollen, Asker.

=== Post-WW2 ===
In 1947, following World War II, the Cambridge Bay LORAN Tower was built near the previous location of Cambridge Bay. The construction of the LORAN tower involved hiring Inuit who, after the tower was complete, remained in the area. The tower was demolished 5 August 2014.

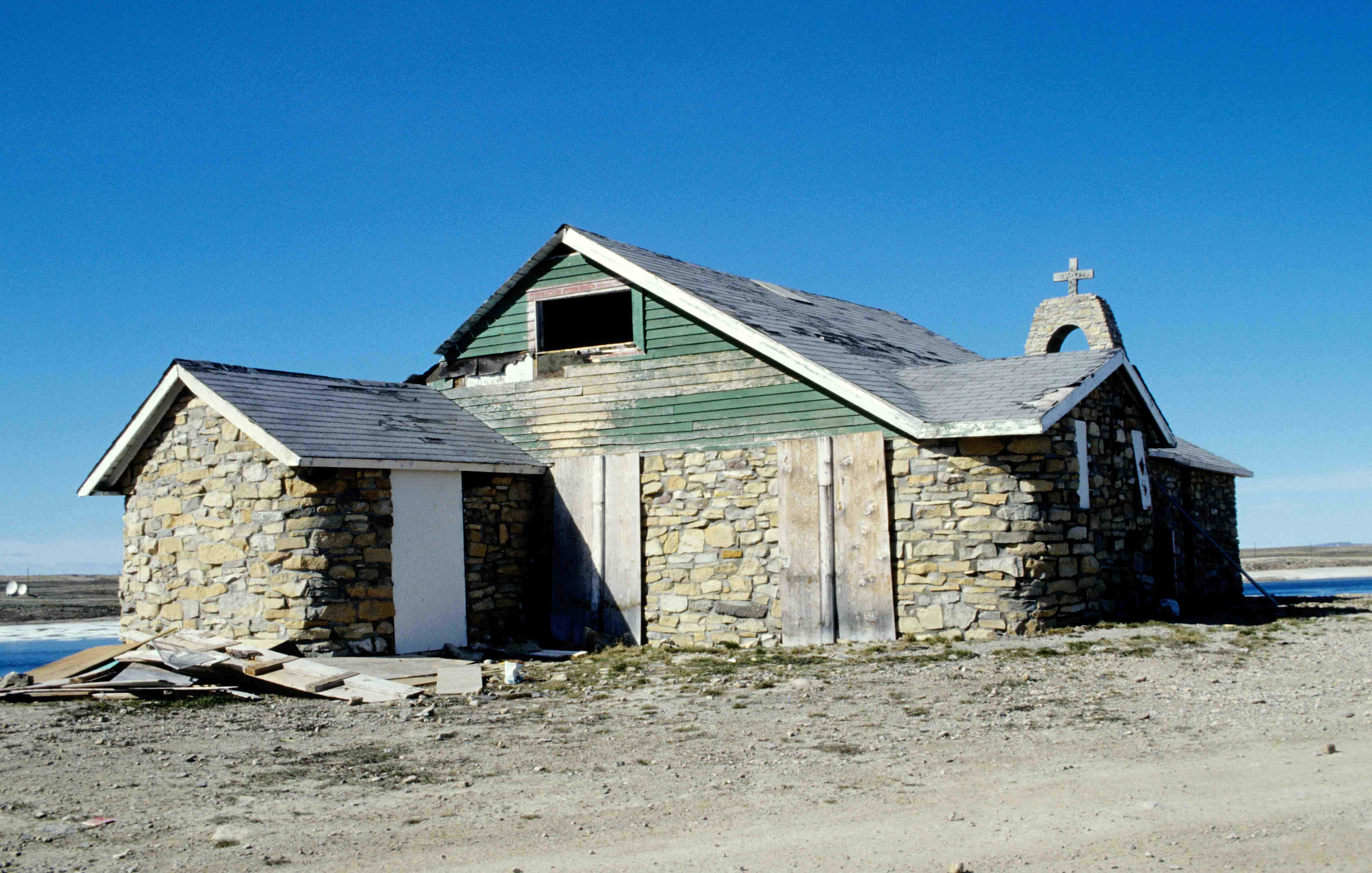
The old stone church in 1998

In 1954 construction was completed on the Roman Catholic Church. The church, Cambridge Bay's first, was constructed from local material using seal oil and sand as mortar, and was used for services until the 1960s. On 27 April 2006, a large portion of the church, which had been designated a heritage site by the Hamlet Council, was destroyed by a fire which the RCMP said was deliberate.

A Distant Early Warning Line site was established in 1955 and about 200 Inuit were hired to help in the construction. The military presence and the services and economy this represented acted as a magnet for Inuit who had previously used the area as a temporary site for meeting, hunting, fishing and trade, and a permanent community was soon established across the bay in its current location. Unlike the majority of the DEW Line radar sites which were abandoned or automated, this site which changed in 1989, known as CAM-MAIN, remains a staffed operation with about 18 people as part of NORAD's North Warning System.

Originally part of the Fort Smith Region, Northwest Territories, Cambridge Bay became the administrative centre for the Kitikmeot Region, Northwest Territories, and remained so for the new Kitikmeot Region after the 1999 division of the Northwest Territories. In 1982 a division plebiscite was held. Although about 80% of the population then living in what is now Nunavut voted in favour of division, Cambridge Bay was one of only two communities to vote against division. Kugluktuk, then called Coppermine, was the other.

=== 21st century ===
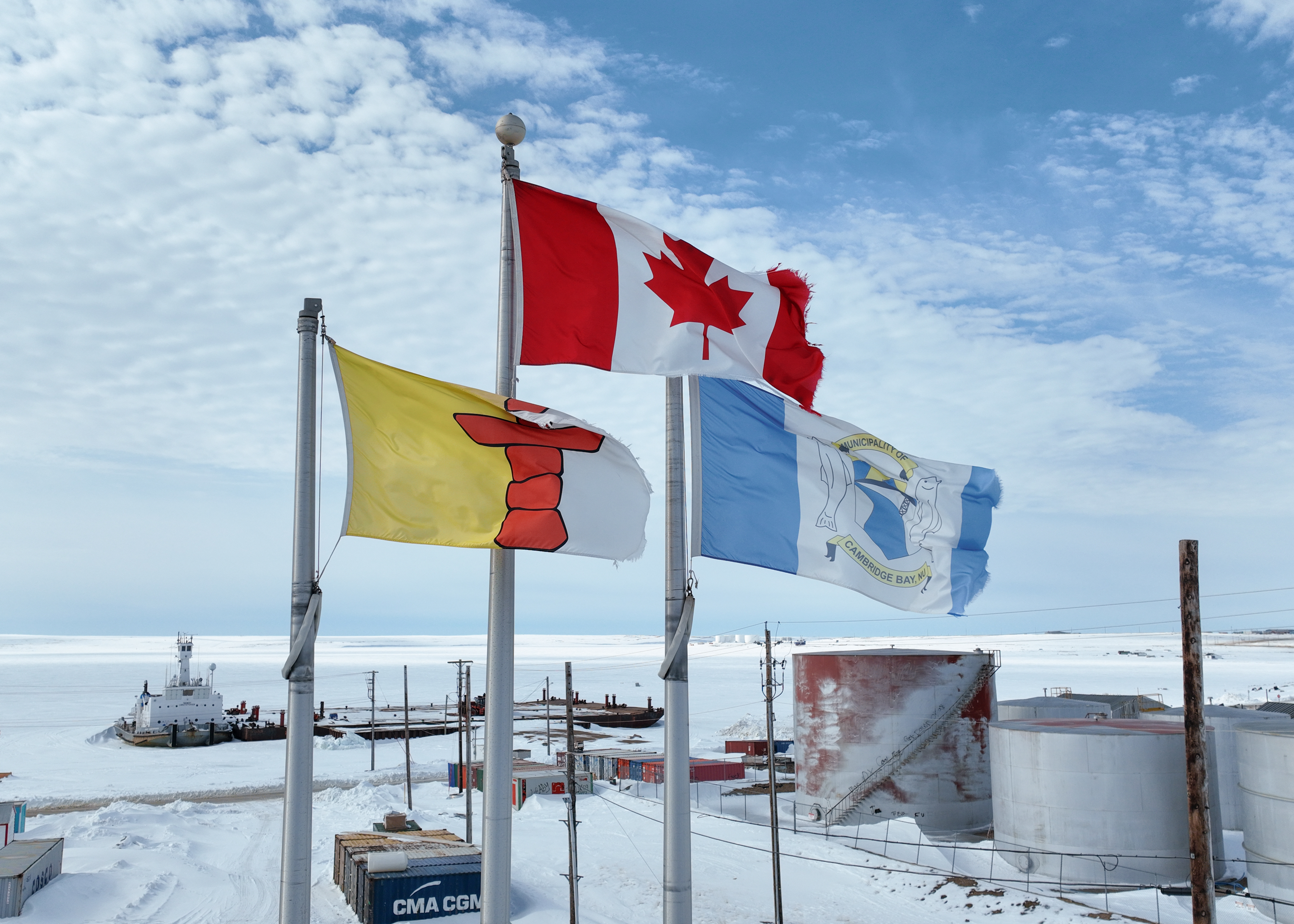
Flags waving in Cambridge Bay

The Kitikmeot Regional Health Centre (Inuktitut: ᕿᑎᕐᒥᐅᓂ ᐊᕕᒃᓯᒪᓂᕐᒥ ᐋᓐᓂᐊᕐᕕᒃ) opened in November 2005 to replace a wellness center that was converted into a hostel. The old facility was temporarily reactivated for medical use in 2007 after a fire at the new building.

Cambridge Bay is the location of the Canadian High Arctic Research Station (CHARS) campus as announced by Prime Minister Stephen Harper on 24 August 2010. This multidisciplinary station is operated year-round by Polar Knowledge Canada, a federal agency. It is a keystone of Canada's Northern Strategy. Its mandate is stated:

To be a world-class research station in Canada's Arctic that is on the cutting edge of Arctic issues. The Station will anchor a strong research presence in Canada's Arctic that serves Canada and the world. It will advance Canada's knowledge of the Arctic in order to improve economic opportunities, environmental stewardship, and the quality of life of Northerners and all Canadians.

— Aboriginal Affairs and Northern Development Canada

== Geography ==
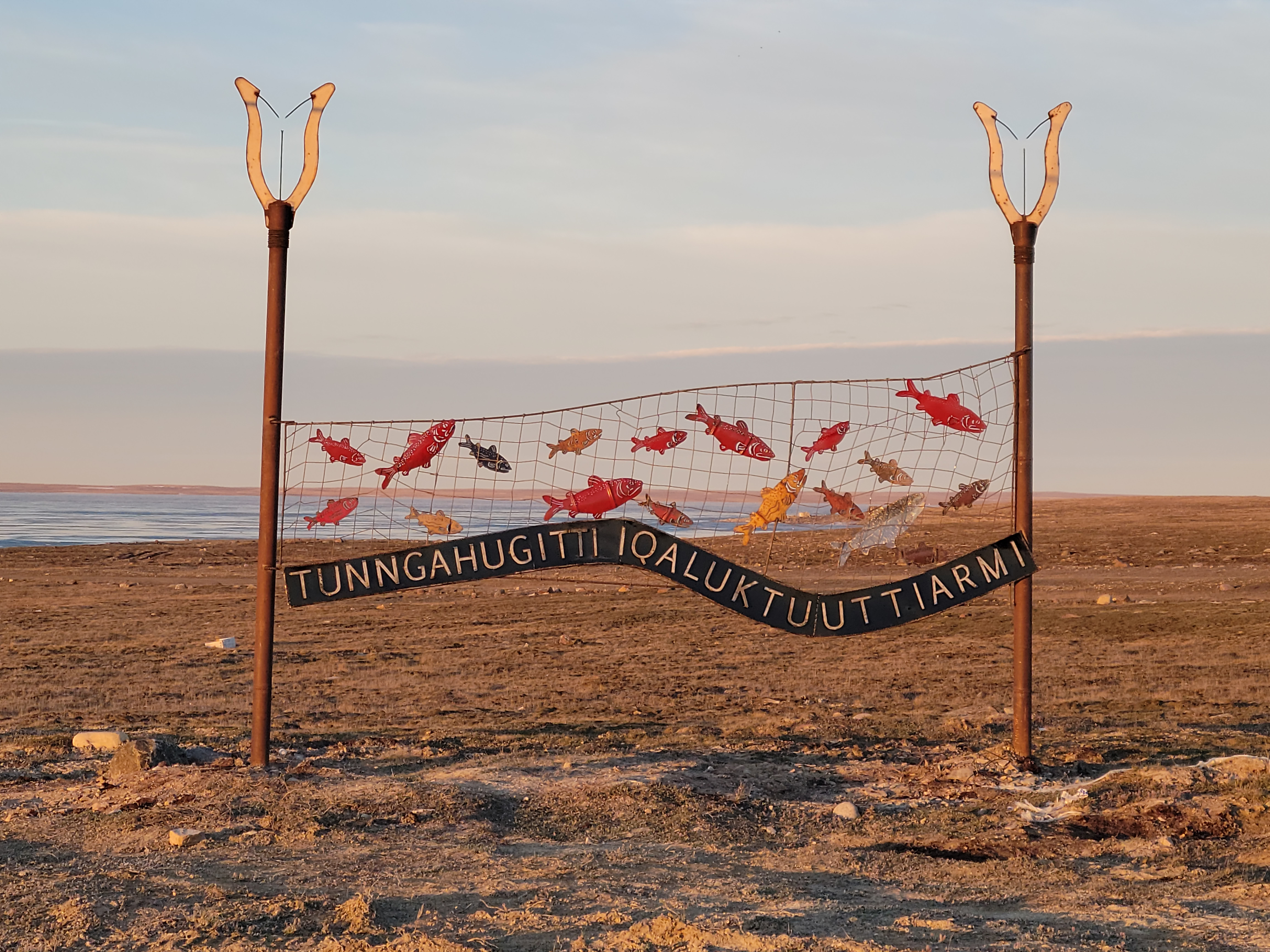
Tunngahugitti Iqaluktuuttiarmi – Welcome to Cambridge Bay

Situated between Dease Strait and Queen Maud Gulf on the southeast coast of Victoria Island (Kitlineq), part of the Arctic Archipelago, Cambridge Bay is a transportation and administrative centre for the Kitikmeot Region. To the north of the community is Tahiryuaq (also spelt Tahikyoak and formerly Ferguson Lake) which flows into Wellington Bay via the Ekalluk River. The Ekalluk River is both an important commercial fishing and archaeological area, and of particular importance is the short section of the river known as Iqaluktuuq.

About 37 km (23 mi) west of the community lie the Finlayson Islands which were surveyed by Sir Richard Collinson on board HMS Enterprise during his search for the lost expedition of Sir John Franklin.

The area was a traditional hunting and fishing location and archaeological sites are often found. The barren-ground caribou, muskox, Arctic char, lake trout and ringed seal were the primary prey, and remain important food sources. Situated east of Cambridge Bay is Ovayok Territorial Park, which includes the large esker known as Uvayuq, formerly Ovayok or Mount Pelly.

=== Climate ===
Cambridge Bay has a polar climate, no month having an average temperature of 10 °C (50 °F) or higher, and is listed as ET on the Köppen climate classification. It has never recorded a temperature above freezing between 31 October and 19 April. Summers are typically cool and rainy, with pleasant days and chilly nights. Winters are cold, dark, and long, with October being the snowiest month. Snowfall and frosts are possible all year round, though rare during July. Rainfall is usually limited to the summer months of June to September, when the temperature rises above freezing for a few months before dipping back down for another nine months of winter. Average high temperatures reach freezing around June 1 and drop below freezing around September 24. Springs are typically sunny but still very chilly. Autumns are short and crisp, with more frequent cloud cover starting to appear during August and with September being almost constantly cloudy.

The sun is continuously below the horizon, polar night, from approximately 30 November to 11 January and above the horizon, midnight sun, 19 May to 22 July.

Climate data for Cambridge Bay (Cambridge Bay Airport) WMO ID: 71925; coordinates 69°06′29″N 105°08′18″W; elevation: 31.1 m (102 ft); 1991–2020 normals (Note: Climate data 1991–2020 is a composite also recorded at Cambridge Bay GSN; WMO ID: 71288; coordinates 69°06′29″N 105°08′18″W; elevation: 18.7 m (61 ft) and Cambridge Bay Airport at WMO ID: 71925; coordinates 69°06′29″N 105°08′14″W; elevation: 31.1 m (102 ft))
Month	Jan	Feb	Mar	Apr	May	Jun	Jul	Aug	Sep	Oct	Nov	Dec	Year
Record high humidex	−5.0	−9.7	−4.1	3.9	10.5	25.3	30.8	28.6	16.3	5.8	−0.6	−3.5	30.8
Record high °C (°F)	−4.9 (23.2)	−9.4 (15.1)	−4.0 (24.8)	6.1 (43.0)	11.5 (52.7)	23.6 (74.5)	28.9 (84.0)	26.1 (79.0)	16.4 (61.5)	6.9 (44.4)	0.0 (32.0)	−3.4 (25.9)	28.9 (84.0)
Mean daily maximum °C (°F)	−27.7 (−17.9)	−28.6 (−19.5)	−24.9 (−12.8)	−16.2 (2.8)	−5.2 (22.6)	6.0 (42.8)	13.3 (55.9)	10.3 (50.5)	2.6 (36.7)	−6.6 (20.1)	−17.5 (0.5)	−24.3 (−11.7)	−9.9 (14.2)
Daily mean °C (°F)	−31.2 (−24.2)	−32.1 (−25.8)	−28.8 (−19.8)	−20.7 (−5.3)	−8.9 (16.0)	3.0 (37.4)	9.4 (48.9)	7.4 (45.3)	0.5 (32.9)	−9.5 (14.9)	−21.1 (−6.0)	−27.8 (−18.0)	−13.3 (8.1)
Mean daily minimum °C (°F)	−34.6 (−30.3)	−35.6 (−32.1)	−32.7 (−26.9)	−25.1 (−13.2)	−12.6 (9.3)	0.0 (32.0)	5.4 (41.7)	4.3 (39.7)	−1.7 (28.9)	−12.3 (9.9)	−24.7 (−12.5)	−31.3 (−24.3)	−16.7 (1.9)
Record low °C (°F)	−52.8 (−63.0)	−50.6 (−59.1)	−48.3 (−54.9)	−42.8 (−45.0)	−35.0 (−31.0)	−17.8 (0.0)	−8.2 (17.2)	−8.9 (16.0)	−17.2 (1.0)	−33.0 (−27.4)	−43.9 (−47.0)	−49.4 (−56.9)	−52.8 (−63.0)
Record low wind chill	−73.4	−72.6	−69.8	−60.1	−43.2	−29.2	−7.9	−18.1	−28.6	−49.4	−60.7	−66.3	−73.4
Average precipitation mm (inches)	5.6 (0.22)	5.9 (0.23)	9.2 (0.36)	6.9 (0.27)	6.7 (0.26)	16.4 (0.65)	28.0 (1.10)	23.5 (0.93)	18.4 (0.72)	14.8 (0.58)	8.9 (0.35)	6.2 (0.24)	150.4 (5.92)
Average rainfall mm (inches)	0.0 (0.0)	0.0 (0.0)	0.0 (0.0)	0.0 (0.0)	0.8 (0.03)	11.4 (0.45)	28.0 (1.10)	22.4 (0.88)	13.2 (0.52)	0.9 (0.04)	0.0 (0.0)	0.0 (0.0)	76.7 (3.02)
Average snowfall cm (inches)	6.3 (2.5)	5.5 (2.2)	8.1 (3.2)	7.5 (3.0)	6.4 (2.5)	3.4 (1.3)	0.2 (0.1)	1.8 (0.7)	5.4 (2.1)	16.6 (6.5)	10.9 (4.3)	7.4 (2.9)	79.4 (31.3)
Average precipitation days (≥ 0.2 mm)	8.4	7.5	11.7	7.9	6.9	9.4	11.1	12.3	12.0	13.8	10.8	8.6	120.5
Average rainy days (≥ 0.2 mm)	0.0	0.0	0.0	0.0	0.8	6.5	10.4	11.8	6.8	0.83	0.0	0.0	37.2
Average snowy days (≥ 0.2 cm)	8.0	6.2	10.0	7.5	6.2	3.5	0.2	0.8	5.7	13.1	10.2	8.4	79.9
Average relative humidity (%) (at 1500 LST)	66.4	66.4	68.7	73.9	82.8	78.0	68.0	73.4	82.2	86.2	75.8	68.6	74.2
Source: Environment and Climate Change Canada (June maximum

== Demographics ==
In the 2021 Canadian census conducted by Statistics Canada, Cambridge Bay had a population of 1,760 living in 571 of its 701 total private dwellings, a change of −0.3% from its 2016 population of 1,766. With a land area of 195.78 km^{2} (75.59 sq mi), it had a population density of 9.0/km^{2} (23.3/sq mi) in 2021.

The median age of the population in 2021 was 30.4 and 76.1% of the people were over 15. Both of these figures are slightly higher than the numbers for Nunavut as a whole (25.6 and 67.5%). In 2021, 82.4% (Nunavut: 85.2%) of the population were listed as Indigenous and 17.6% (Nunavut: 14.8%) as non-Aboriginal. Of the total population 79.5% (Nunavut: 83.7%) were Inuit, 0.9% (Nunavut: 0.3%) Métis and 0.6% (Nunavut: 0.5%) First Nations.

Federal census population history of Cambridge Bay
Year	Pop.	±%
1976	616	—
1981	815	+32.3%
1986	1,002	+22.9%
1991	1,116	+11.4%
1996	1,351	+21.1%
2001	1,309	−3.1%
2006	1,477	+12.8%
2011	1,608	+8.9%
2016	1,766	+9.8%
2021	1,760	−0.3%
Source: Statistics Canada

Panethnic groups in Cambridge Bay (2001–2021)
Panethnic group	2021		2016		2011		2006		2001	
Panethnic group	Pop.	%	Pop.	%	Pop.	%	Pop.	%	Pop.	%
Indigenous	1,450	83.09%	1,465	84.44%	1,290	81.39%	1,215	82.37%	1,035	79.01%
European (Note: Statistic includes all persons that did not make up part of a visible minority or an indigenous identity.)	215	12.32%	225	12.97%	260	16.4%	235	15.93%	260	19.85%
African	35	2.01%	20	1.15%	10	0.63%	10	0.68%	20	1.53%
Southeast Asian (Note: Statistic includes total responses of "Filipino" and "Southeast Asian" under visible minority section on census.)	20	1.15%	10	0.58%	15	0.95%	20	1.36%	0	0%
South Asian	20	1.15%	10	0.58%	0	0%	10	0.68%	0	0%
Latin American	10	0.57%	0	0%	0	0%	0	0%	0	0%
East Asian (Note: Statistic includes total responses of "Chinese", "Korean", and "Japanese" under visible minority section on census.)	0	0%	10	0.58%	0	0%	10	0.68%	0	0%
Middle Eastern (Note: Statistic includes total responses of "West Asian" and "Arab" under visible minority section on census.)	0	0%	10	0.58%	0	0%	0	0%	0	0%
Other / multiracial (Note: Statistic includes total responses of "Visible minority, n.i.e." and "Multiple visible minorities" under visible minority section on census.)	20	1.15%	0	0%	0	0%	10	0.68%	0	0%
Total responses	1,745	99.15%	1,735	98.24%	1,585	98.57%	1,475	99.86%	1,310	100.08%
Total population	1,760	100%	1,766	100%	1,608	100%	1,477	100%	1,309	100%
Note: Totals greater than 100% due to multiple origin responses

== Canadian High Arctic Research Station campus ==
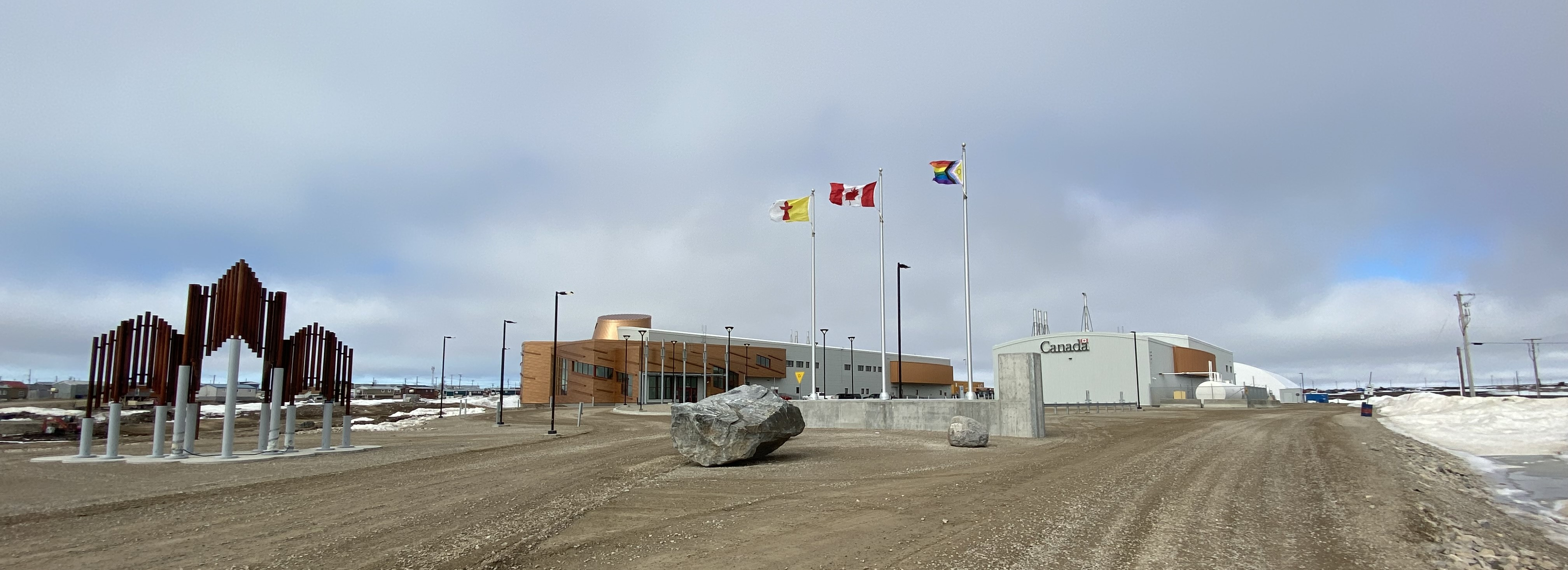
CHARS in 2023

The Canadian High Arctic Research Station (CHARS) is a research facility located in Cambridge Bay. It is operated by Polar Knowledge Canada, and supports a wide range of research needs, such as environmental monitoring or genetic testing. Its location was chosen after a feasibility study that also included Pond Inlet and Resolute as potential locations. Construction of the campus was announced in 2012 by former Prime Minister Stephen Harper. Construction began in August of 2014 and finished on August 21, 2019. In 2016, the campus received more than 600 job applications.

== Education ==
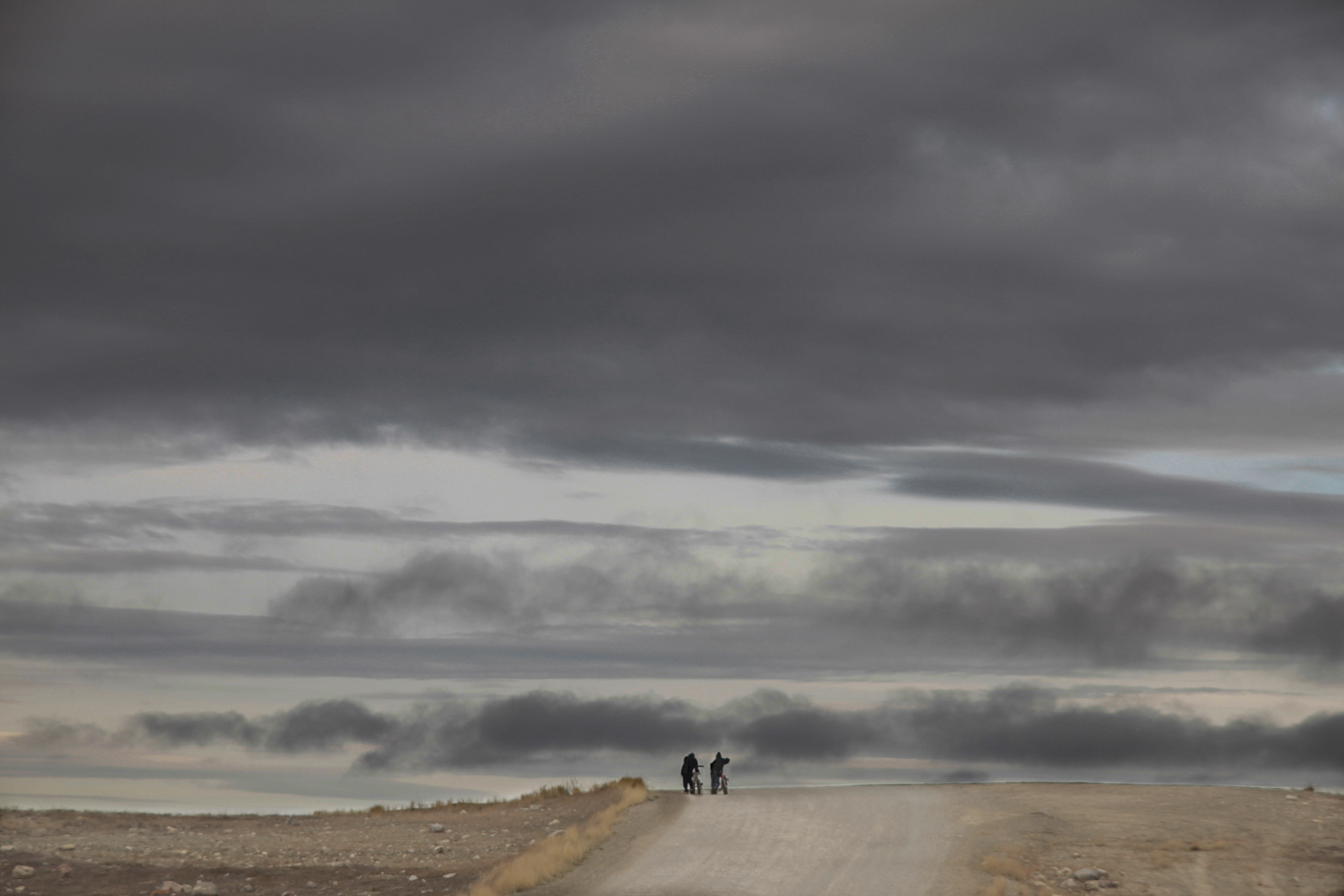
On the road to Mt Pelly, 2011

Several educational services are available, including daycare, preschool, Kullik Ilihakvik (elementary school) named for the traditional stone lamp the qulliq, Killinik High School, and a public library and museum located in the high school. The community is also the regional centre for the Kitikmeot Campus of Nunavut Arctic College who oversee the Cambridge Bay Community Learning Centre. Courses range from Adult Basic Education to the Nunavut Teacher Education Program (NTEP), which, in partnership with the University of Regina, is able to offer a Bachelor of Education.

== Land claims ==
The Kitikmeot Inuit Association, Nunavut Impact Review Board, and Nunavut Planning Commission have offices in Cambridge Bay, as well as the Lands and Resources Department of Nunavut Tunngavik Incorporated.

== Religion ==
There are three churches in Cambridge Bay: St. George's Anglican Church, which is part of the Diocese of Arctic, Our Lady of the Arctic Roman Catholic Church, which is part of the Diocese of Mackenzie–Fort Smith, and the Glad Tidings Pentecostal Church.

== Economy and infrastructure ==
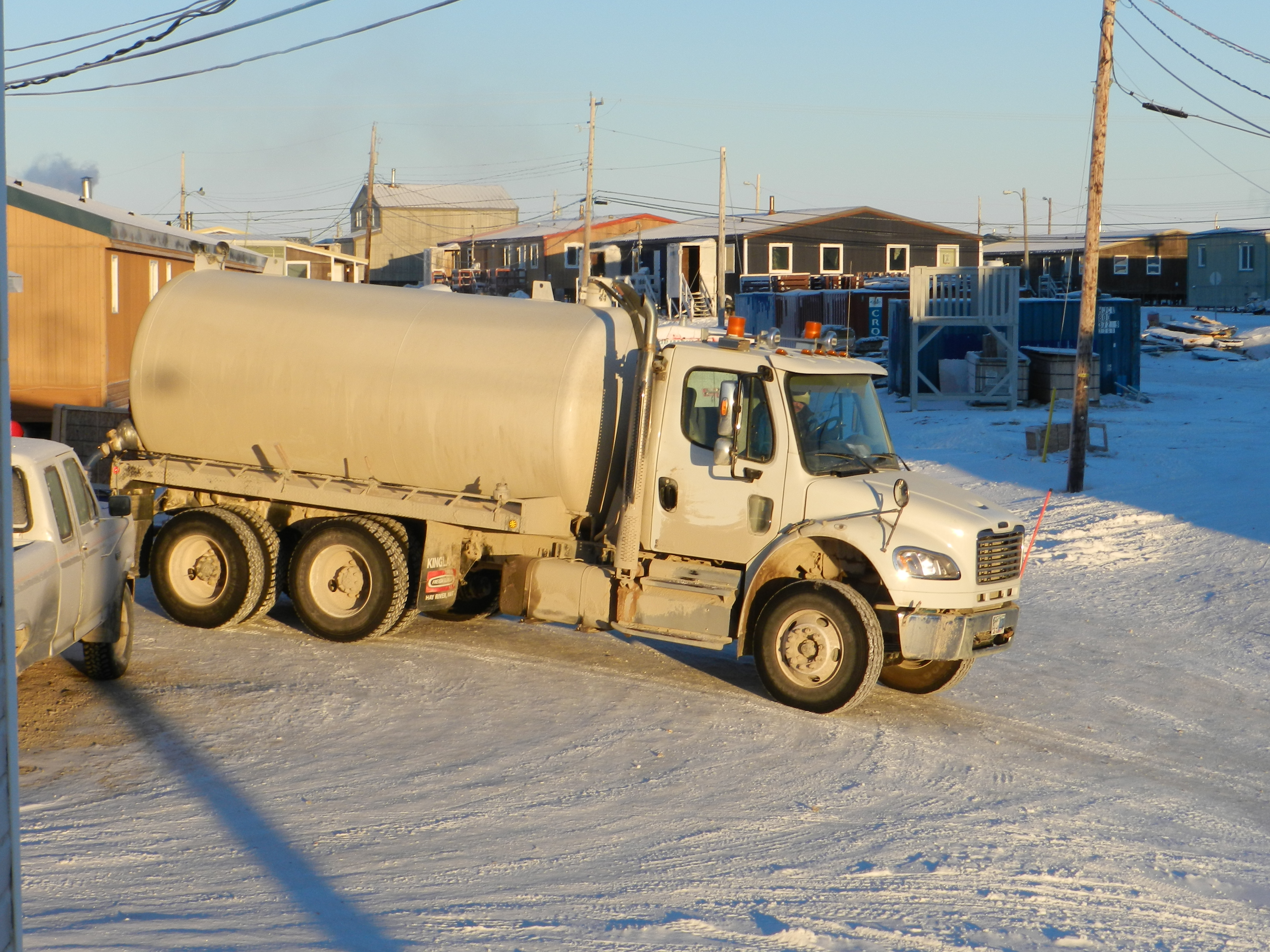
A honeywagon (vacuum truck) in Cambridge Bay

There are several businesses in the community. These include a Northern Store (which includes a Quick Stop, selling KFC and Pizza Hut products), the Ikaluktutiak Co-operative, part of the Arctic Co-operatives Limited, a branch of the Royal Bank of Canada and a stand-alone Canada Post postal service. Other community businesses include Jago Services, plumbing and electrical, Qillaq operates construction services, mechanics shop, heating fuel and gasoline sales as well as a service garage. Kalgen's operates the Dis & Dat Convenience Store and a separate Dis & Dat Hardware Division (formerly Kitikmeot Supplies), a hardware store. Kalvik Enterprises and Nanook Woodworking, both construction companies and Inukshuk Enterprises, a general contractor, who also operate a service garage and a convenience store. The Canadian High Arctic Research Station also provides some local employment.

There is a modern health centre, the Kitikmeot Regional Health Centre, in the community that opened in 2005. It provides facilities that were previously unavailable in the region, however certain procedures still require a trip to Yellowknife or Edmonton. In 2010, the birthing centre was opened in the same building and included local midwives. In 2017, the long term residential care unit was opened upstairs at the Kitikmeot Regional Health Centre. There is a RCMP detachment here, and the Kitikmeot Law Centre has its offices in the community. The hotels include the Umingmak Lodge Bed and Breakfast, the Arctic Islands Lodge, run by the Co-op and the Green Row operated by Inukshuk Enterprises.

Phone service is provided by Northwestel, a division of BCE Inc. and, with their companion Bell Mobility, also handle cell phone coverage. Buildings in Cambridge Bay, like in most Nunavut communities, have water and sewage tanks that require regular services by truck. These services along with garbage pick-up are done by the Hamlet.

== Media ==
=== Radio ===
Frequency	Call sign	Branding	Format	Owner	Notes
FM 97.7	CFBI-FM	–	Community radio	Cambridge Bay Communications Society	Broadcasts programming in English and Inuinnaqtun
FM 101.9	CFFB-1-FM	CBC Radio One	Talk radio, public radio	Canadian Broadcasting Corporation	Rebroadcaster of CFFB (Iqaluit)
FM 105.1	CBIN-FM	CBC Radio One	Talk radio, public radio	Canadian Broadcasting Corporation	Rebroadcaster of CHAK (Inuvik)

Cambridge Bay is served by two CBC Radio One rebroadcasters to allow residents to hear Inuvialuktun language programming, which is the language spoken in Cambridge Bay, that is aired in the afternoons by CHAK.

=== Television ===
- Channel 9 – CBENT, CBC North went dark 31 July 2012
- Channel 51 is a local channel run by the Kitikmeot Inuit Association featuring local and territorial films, videos and documentaries.

Cable television is available from the local Co-op and satellite television from either Shaw Direct or Bell Satellite TV.

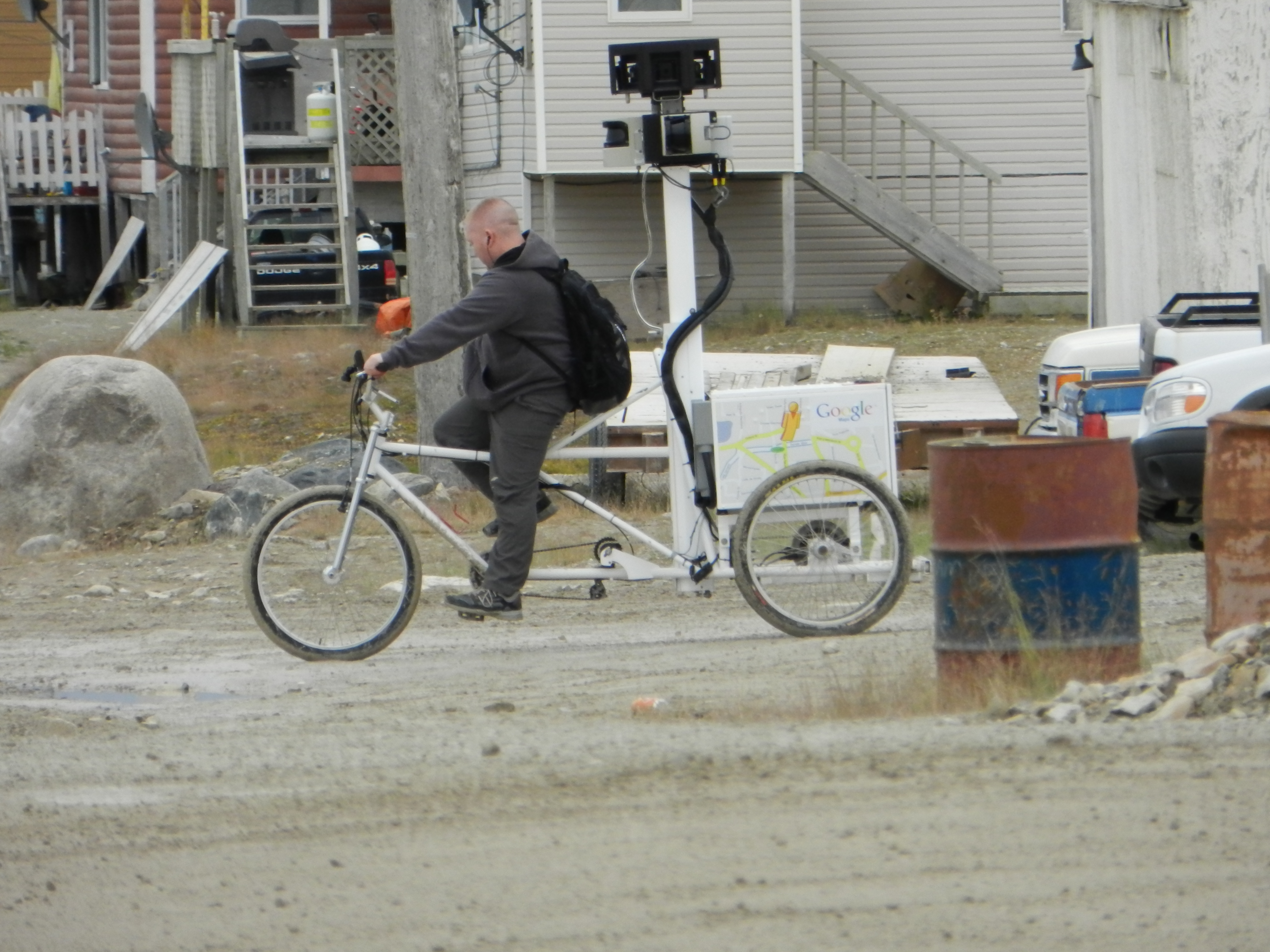
Google Trike in Cambridge Bay, Nunavut, August 2012

=== Internet services ===
- Northwestel High Speed Internet, DSL
- Qiniq is a broadband Internet service provider for Nunavut. The community has been served by the Qiniq network since 2005. Qiniq is a fixed wireless service to homes and businesses, connecting to the outside world via a satellite backbone. The Qiniq network is designed and operated by SSi Canada. In 2017, the network was upgraded to 4G LTE technology, and 2G-GSM for mobile voice.
- Starlink, a satellite internet constellation operated by SpaceX, providing satellite Internet access

== Transportation ==
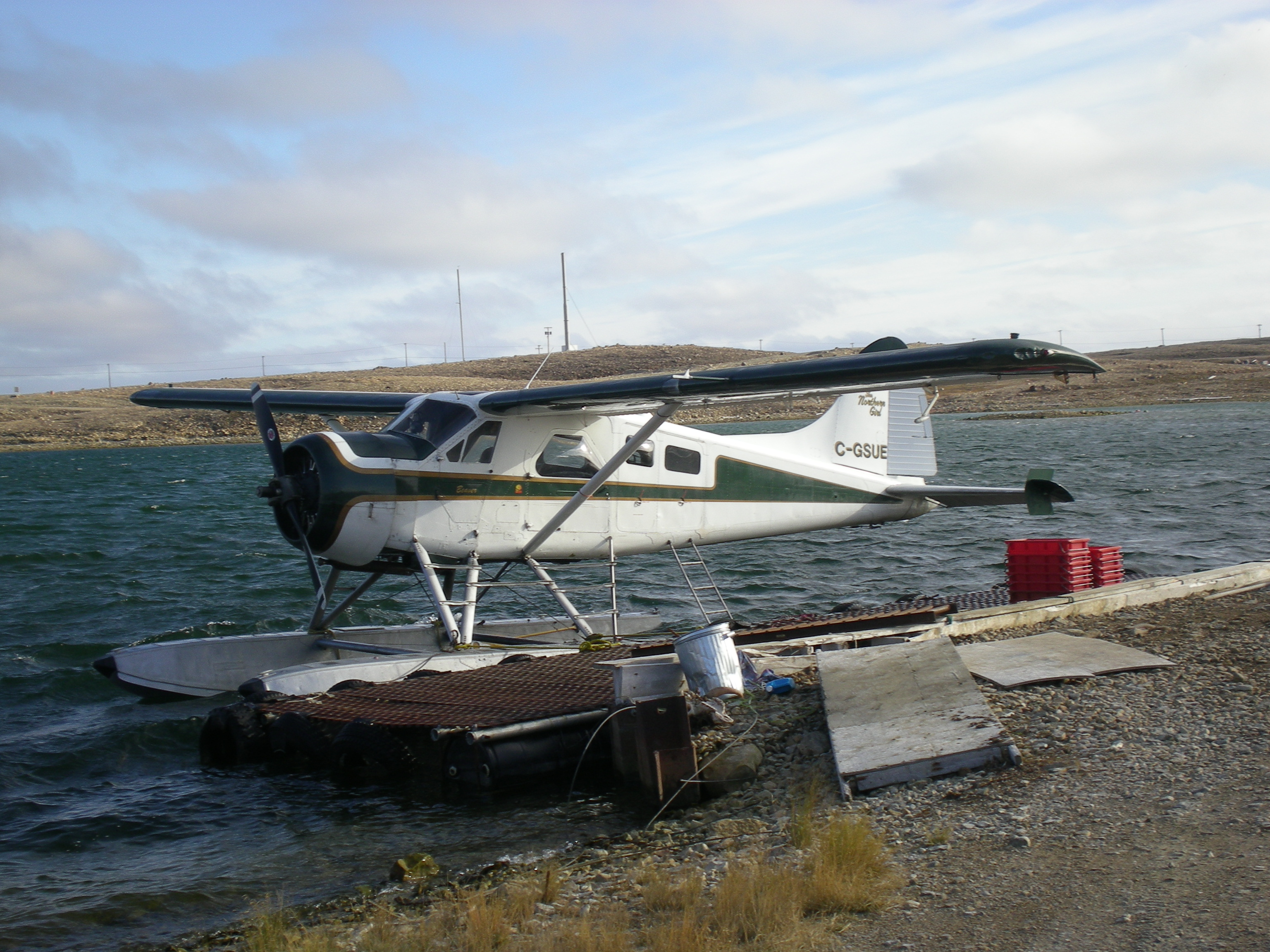
DAL Aviation de Havilland Beaver

Although Cambridge Bay lies on the Northwest Passage, there are no passenger ships other than tourist cruises. Cargo shipping lines include NEAS (from Nunavut and Nunavik) and Nunavut Sealink and Supply, Arctic Co-operatives Limited, Desgagnes Transarctik, the Qikiqtaaluk Corporation, Sakku Investments Corporation and the Kitikmeot Corporation provide an annual sealift of food and supplies to the community. Marine Transportation Services, a subsidiary of the Northwest Territories government, provided similar sealifts until 2021, when they ended their service due to low customer demand.

The only passenger services are through the Cambridge Bay Airport, from which daily air service to Yellowknife and other Kitikmeot Region communities are offered by Canadian North.

Charter and MEDIVAC (air ambulance) services are provided by Keewatin Air. Former MEDIVAC operator Adlair Aviation still operates charters in the region. In the summer floatplane charters are provided by DAL Aviation from the Cambridge Bay Water Aerodrome.

In 2012, the roads of Cambridge Bay were imaged for Google Street View by a tricycle fitted with a camera system. While Cambridge Bay had no cars at the time (only snowmobiles, ATVs, SUVs, buses and trucks), Google responded to a proposal by Cambridge Bay resident Chris Kalluk to include Arctic communities in Street View in order to educate the rest of the world.

== Notable residents ==
- Stephen Angulalik, an Ahiarmiut fur trader and trading post operator at Kuugjuaq (Perry River).
- Bill Lyall, was a member of the 8th Northwest Territories Legislative Assembly from 1975 to 1979, he was later awarded the Order of Canada for his work with the Arctic Cooperative
- Helen Maksagak, the first woman and the first Inuk to be Commissioner of the Northwest Territories (1995–1999) and the first Commissioner of Nunavut (1999–2000), she was awarded the Order of Canada for her work.
- Kelvin Ng, won the 1995 election and the first Nunavut election in 1999 representing the Cambridge Bay riding.
- Red Pedersen, worked with Stephen Angulalik while at Perry River and was elected in both the 1993 NWT election and the 1997 NWT election.
- Keith Peterson, was the current member of Legislative Assembly of Nunavut having won in the 2004 election and was acclaimed in the 2008 election. Peterson was the longest serving Minister of Finance, and was Minister of Health and Social Services. He retired in 2017.
- Tanya Tagaq (Tanya Tagaq Gillis), an Inuk throat singer and painter She has performed at Folk on the Rocks in 2005, 2010 and 2015, toured with Björk and released six albums and an EP, Sinaa, Auk/Blood, Anuraaqtuq, Animism (Juno Awards winner in 2015 for Aboriginal Album of the Year and 2014 Polaris Music Prize winner), Retribution, Toothsayer, and Tongues.
- Kane Tologanak, elected to represent the Central Arctic in the 1979 election.

== See also ==
- List of municipalities in Nunavut
- Royal eponyms in Canada
- Marten Hartwell and the Inuk who saved him, David Pisurayak Kootook
