= Festival Distribution =

Festival Distribution was a Canadian independent record label and music distributor, specializing in folk, blues and world music artists. The company was formed in 1993 when it purchased the music distribution arm of the Vancouver Folk Music Festival. At its zenith, there were over 3,000 titles offered.

The distribution company marketed the music from many important Canadian artists including Stan Rogers, Connie Kaldor, Roy Forbes, Eileen McGann (musician), Kobo Town, and Kiran Ahluwalia. The company's imprint Jericho Beach Music is still active with releases by James Keelaghan, Alpha Yaya Diallo, The Wailin' Jennys, Kim Barlow, e.s.l., Ndidi Onukwulu and Geoff Berner in the active catalogue.

Festival was also the Canadian distributor for American and international labels in the genres, including Righteous Babe, Red House, Hightone, Delmark, Waterlily Acoustic, Moment and Music for Little People.

The distribution operation closed its doors in 2008 owing to the general downturn in the market for physical CDs.
