= Albert Edward Bay =

Bay in Nunavut, Canada

- Location in Nunavut
- Location: Eastern Victoria Island
- Coordinates: 69°34′N 103°10′W
- River sources: Ekalluk River
- Basin countries: Canada
- Settlements: Uninhabited

Albert Edward Bay is a bay on the southeast side of Victoria Island in the Arctic Archipelago. It faces Victoria Strait to the east. There are several islands in the bay, the largest of which is Admiralty Island at its mouth. Its north side is the Collinson Peninsula.

It is part of the Kitikmeot Region, Nunavut, Canada and is named in honour of King Edward VII. The first European to see it was John Rae in 1851, followed by some of Richard Collinson's men two years later. It is the ancestral home of the Ekalluktogmiut group of Copper Inuit who lived along the Ekalluk River.
