= Jeannie Ehaloak =

Canadian Inuk politician

The Honourable Jeannie Ehaloak MLA
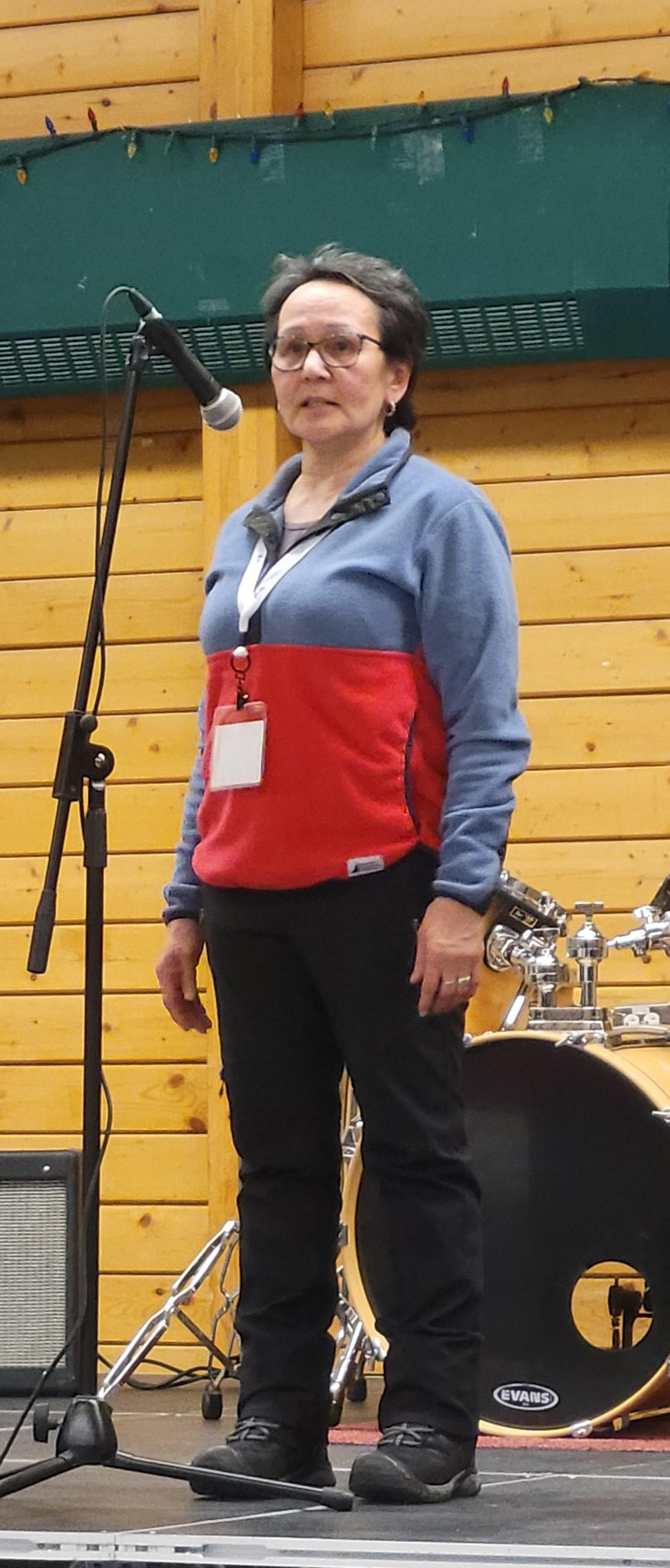

Member of the Legislative Assembly of Nunavut
- In office October 30, 2017 – September 20, 2021
- Preceded by: Keith Peterson
- Succeeded by: Pamela Gross
- Constituency: Cambridge Bay

Mayor of Cambridge Bay, Nunavut
- In office 2011–2017
- Preceded by: Syd Glawson
- Succeeded by: Joe Ohokannoak (acting)

Jeannie Hakongak Ehaloak is a Canadian Inuk politician, who was elected to the Legislative Assembly of Nunavut in the 2017 general election. She represented the electoral district of Cambridge Bay from 2017 to 2021.

Prior to her election to the legislature, Ehaloak served as mayor of Cambridge Bay.

== Early life ==
At four years old, Ehaloak was forcibly relocated by the Canadian government to Indian residential school in Inuvik.

== Career ==
Ehaloak was a hamlet councillor for Cambridge Bay and worked in Nunavut Tunngavik Incorporated before running for mayor in 2011.

Ehaloak ran for the Cambridge Bay riding in the 2017 Nunavut general election and won. After the victory, she vacated her mayor position. She was assigned to three portfolios and became the Minister of Justice, Minister responsible for Qulliq Energy Corporation and Minister responsible for Status of Women. After a cabinet shuffle in November 2020, she retained her responsibility as Minister for Qulliq Energy Corporation and also became the Minister of Community and Government Services. She was defeated by Pam Gross in the 2021 Nunavut general election.

She became the director for communications for Polar Knowledge Canada in 2022.
