= Tahiryuaq =

Lake in Nunavut, Canada

- Ferguson Lake
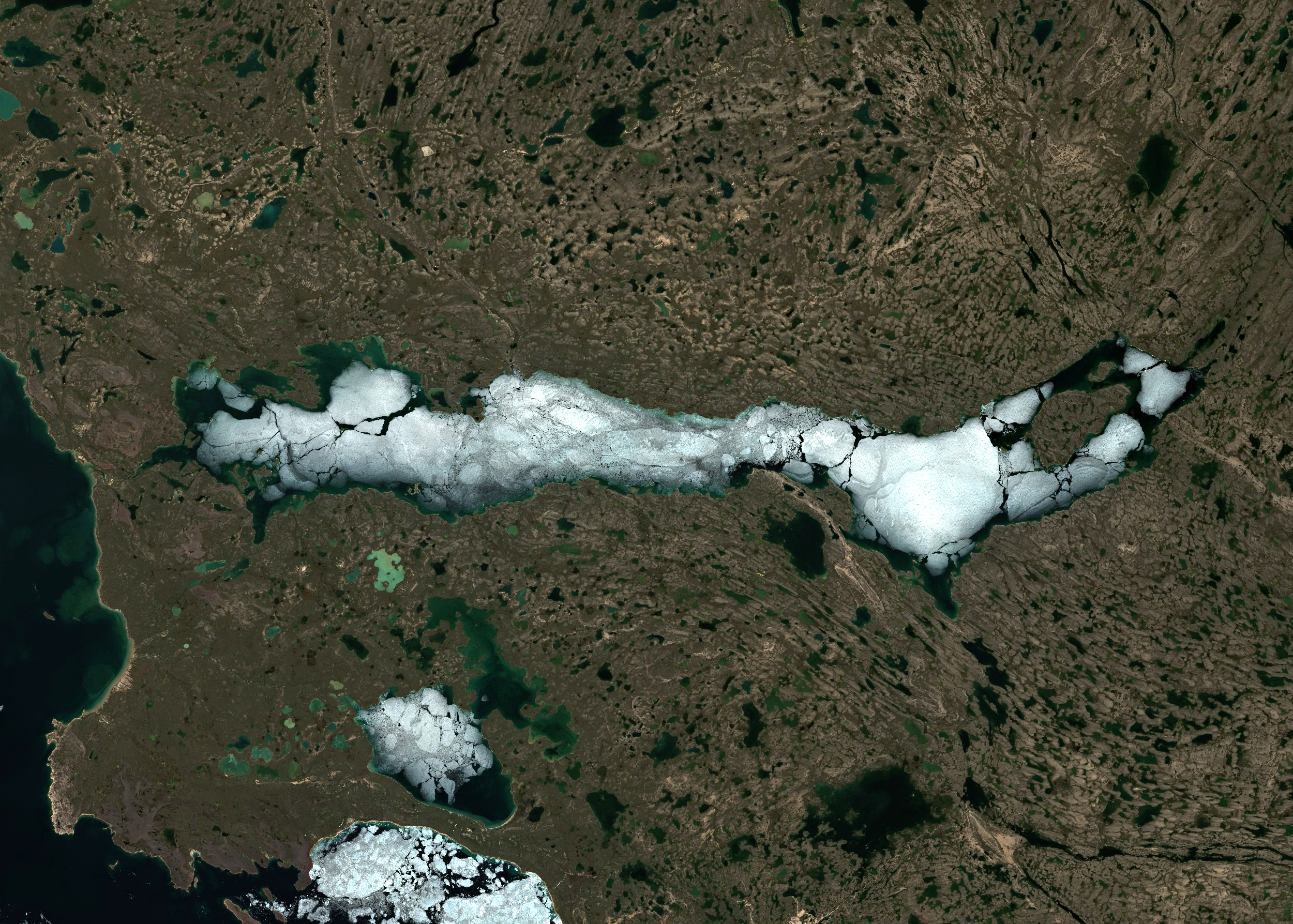
- Sentinel-2 image (2022)

- Location in Nunavut Tahiryuaq (Canada)
- Location: southern Victoria Island, in Kitikmeot, Nunavut
- Coordinates: 69°25′16″N 105°16′03″W
- Primary outflows: Ekalluk River
- Basin countries: Canada
- Surface area: 588 km^{2} (227 sq mi)
- Surface elevation: 11 m (36 ft)
- Islands: 8 km × 4 km (5.0 mi × 2.5 mi)
- Settlements: Cambridge Bay, 50 km (31 mi) south

Tahiryuaq, formerly Ferguson Lake, (Inuinnaqtun: Tahikyoak) is located on southern Victoria Island in the Kitikmeot Region of Nunavut, in northern Canada. It drains westward into Iqaluktuuq (meaning "place of big fish") which is a segment of the Ekalluk River, 8.0 km (5 mi) from the northeastern side of Wellington Bay (Ekaloktok), on Dease Strait, Arctic Ocean Ferguson Lake was the namesake of Constable Ferguson, a Royal Canadian Mounted Police member, but is now known by the original name of Tahiryuaq

Tahiryuaq has been characterized as "polar semi-desert". Its flora includes willow-sedge meadows, dryas uplands, and raised beaches. The narrow land area between Wellington Bay and Tahiryuaq funnels migrating Dolphin-Union caribou herd, making them easy prey for Inuit hunters. Muskox, Arctic hare, and ptarmigan also inhabit the area. The lake itself contains Arctic char (iqalukpiit) and lake trout (ihuurayuit). These were the principal food sources for Copper Inuit who were predated by people of the Dorset culture through the Thule culture as evidenced by Canadian Arctic archaeological sites on the banks of the lake, its river, and about 1 km north on the bay (Cadfael site).

== See also ==
- List of lakes of Nunavut
- List of lakes of Canada
