= Tanya Tagaq =

Canadian Inuk throat singer

Tanya Tagaq CM
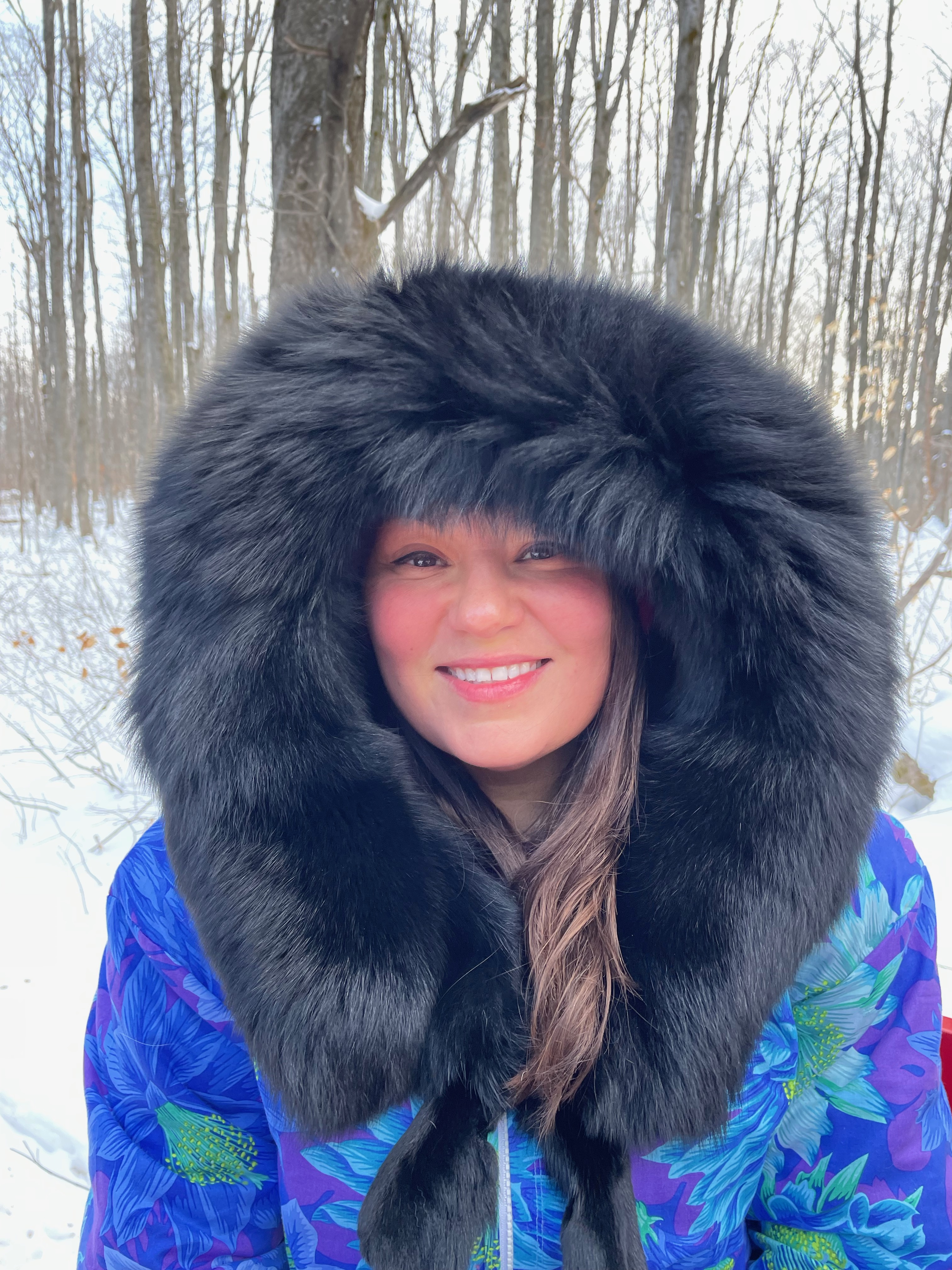
- Tagaq in 2021

Background information
- Born: Tanya Tagaq Gillis; May 5, 1975 (age 51)
- Origin: Cambridge Bay, Nunavut, Canada
- Genres: A cappella; throat singing; folk
- Occupations: Singer; songwriter; novelist; visual artist
- Years active: 2002–present
- Labels: Jericho Beach; Six Shooter; Ipecac
- Website: tanyatagaq.com

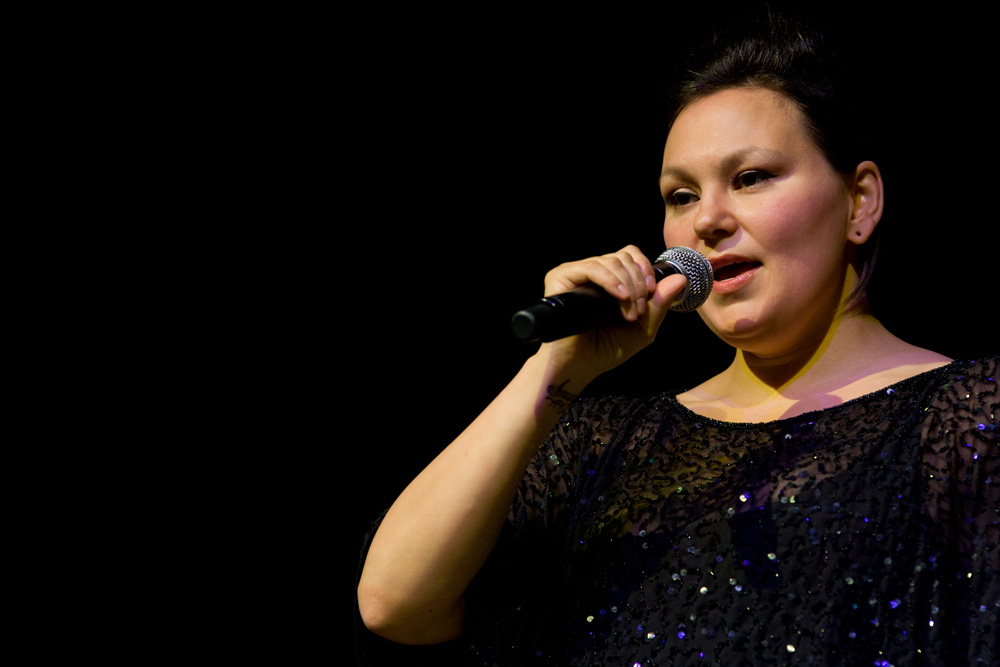
Tanya Tagaq, Moers Festival 2012

Tanya Tagaq CM (Inuktitut syllabics: ᑕᓐᔭ ᑕᒐᖅ, born Tanya Tagaq Gillis, May 5, 1975), also credited as Tagaq, is a Canadian Inuk throat singer, songwriter, novelist, actor, and visual artist from Cambridge Bay (Iqaluktuuttiaq), Nunavut, in Northern Canada.

== Early years ==
At the age of 15, after attending school in Cambridge Bay, Tagaq went to Yellowknife, Northwest Territories, to attend Sir John Franklin High School where she first began to practice throat singing. During this time Tagaq, like most other students from the central Arctic, lived at Akaitcho Hall, the residential facility for Sir John Franklin High School. She later studied visual arts at the Nova Scotia College of Art and Design and while there developed her own solo form of Inuit throat singing, which is normally done by two women. Her decision to go solo was a pragmatic one: she did not have a singing partner.

== Career ==
Tagaq was a popular performer at Canadian folk festivals, such as Folk on the Rocks in 2005, and first became widely known both in Canada and internationally for her collaborations with Björk, including concert tours and the 2004 album Medúlla. She has also performed with the Kronos Quartet and Shooglenifty and has been featured on the Aboriginal Peoples Television Network.

In 2005, her CD entitled Sinaa (Inuktitut for "edge") was nominated for five awards at the Canadian Aboriginal Music Awards. At the ceremony on 25 October 2005, the CD won awards for Best Producer/Engineer, Best Album Design and Tagaq herself won the Best Female Artist award. Sinaa was nominated for the 2006 Juno Awards as the Best Aboriginal Recording.

Although primarily known for her throat singing, Tagaq is also an accomplished artist and her work was featured on the 2003 Northwestel telephone directory.

Her 2008 album Auk/Blood (ᐊᐅᒃ Inuktitut syllabics) features collaborations with Mike Patton, among others. In 2011, she released a live album titled Anuraaqtuq. It was recorded during Tagaq's performance at the Festival International de Musique Actuelle in Victoriaville.

In 2012, Tagaq performed the theme music for the CBC television show Arctic Air.

Tagaq released her third album, Animism, on May 27, 2014, on Six Shooter Records. The album was a shortlisted nominee for the 2014 Polaris Music Prize, her first nomination for that award, and won the $30,000 award on September 22, 2014. The album also won the Juno Award for Aboriginal Recording of the Year at the Juno Awards of 2015, and was nominated for Alternative Album of the Year.

Her fourth album Retribution was released in October 2016. Her show in Toronto in November was sold out.

In May 2018, Tagaq announced her first book, a blend of fiction and memoir titled Split Tooth, which was published in September 2018 by Penguin Random House. The book was named as a longlisted nominee for the 2018 Scotiabank Giller Prize and was shortlisted for the 2019 Amazon.ca First Novel Award.

Her fifth album Tongues, released in 2022, was inspired by Split Tooth and was recorded mostly before the COVID-19 pandemic with New York poet Saul Williams as producer. However, the album was placed on hold for over a year. During that time, mixer Gonjasufi reworked the album to give it a "grimier" sound.

Tagaq appeared in the fourth season of True Detective. This was her first performance as an actor.

In 2025, she appeared in the television series North of North as the goddess Nuliajuk.

Saputjiji was shortlisted for the 2026 Polaris Music Prize.

== Collaborations ==
In 2005, Tagaq collaborated with Okna Tsahan Zam, a Kalmyk Khoomei throat singer, and Wimme, a Sami yoiker from Finland, to release the recording Shaman Voices.

She began collaborating with the Kronos Quartet in 2005. Since then, they have performed together at venues across North America, from the January 2006 debut of the project Nunavut at the Chan Centre for the Performing Arts in Vancouver, British Columbia, through to the New York's Spring for Music Festival at Carnegie Hall presentation of composer Derek Charke's 13 Inuit Throat Song Games (2014). In 2015, Tagaq was commissioned to write a piece for the Kronos Quartet's Fifty for the Future project.

In 2012, Toronto International Film Festival commissioned Tagaq to create a live soundscape for Nanook of the North, as part of the festival's film retrospective First Peoples Cinema: 1500 Nations, One Tradition. Tagaq collaborated with composer Derek Charke, percussionist Jean Martin and violinist Jesse Zubot, and the work was performed at the 2012 TIFF and Under the Radar Festival at New York's Public Theater, 2016, amongst other places. Despite some of the film's more stereotyped depictions of Inuit lives in 1922, Tagaq also found the film the perfect source material: "There are moments in the movie where … my ancestors, they're so amazing." She said to CBC news. "They lived on the land and I just still can't believe that. Growing up in Nunavut and just the harshness of the environment itself, the ability for people to be able to survive with no vegetation, and just the harshest of environments, it's just incredible to me."

Tagaq collaborated with composer Christos Hatzis, author Joseph Boyden and the Winnipeg Symphony Orchestra on the score for the Royal Winnipeg Ballet's Going Home Star: Truth and Reconciliation (2015), which won a 2017 Juno Award for Classical Album of the Year – Large Ensemble.

In 2017, Tagaq and Buffy Sainte-Marie collaborated on the single "You Got to Run (Spirit of the Wind)", which appeared on Sainte-Marie's album Medicine Songs. The song was inspired by George Attla, a champion dog sled racer from Alaska. Tagaq has also appeared as a guest vocalist on songs by July Talk ("Beck + Call") and Weaves ("Scream").

In 2022, Tagaq and Chelsea McMullan collaborated on the documentary film Ever Deadly.

In 2025, Tagaq appeared as a guest musician on The Great Lakes Suite, an album by Canadian indie rock band Rheostatics.

== Activism ==
Tagaq supports Indigenous land rights.

Tagaq advocates for traditional Inuit sealing and the use of seal meat in Inuit cuisine. She was one of several activists to post images of sealskin and seal meat on Twitter in 2014 in protest of a campaign against sealing by Ellen DeGeneres and the Humane Society of the United States. During her Polaris Music Prize acceptance speech in 2014, she encouraged people to wear and eat seal, and shouted, "Fuck PETA". Subsequently, Tagaq tweeted, "I had a scrolling screen of 1200 missing and murdered indigenous women at the Polaris gala but people are losing their minds over seals." In 2016, Tagaq reported that she had been banned from Facebook for posting a photo of a sealskin coat.

The Aboriginal Peoples Television Network named Tagaq one of the 16 Indigenous "movers and shakers to watch in 2016." The list praised Tagaq's activism "to expose hard truths about systemic racism in governments, missing and murdered Indigenous women and proudly supporting the practices and preservation of her culture such as seal hunting."

In 2020, Tagaq provided narration in the music video for "End of the Road", a protest song about the issue of missing and murdered Indigenous women by the rock band Crown Lands.

== Awards and recognition ==
- 2006 Juno Awards, nominee: Aboriginal Recording of the Year, Sinaa
- 2009 Juno Awards, nominee: Aboriginal Recording of the Year and Instrumental Album of the Year, Auk/Blood
- 2014 Polaris Music Prize, winner: Animism
- 2014 Canadian Folk Music Pushing the Boundaries Award
- 2015 Juno Awards, nominee: Alternative Album of the Year, Animism
- 2015 Juno Awards, winner: Aboriginal Recording of the Year, Animism
- 2015 Western Canadian Music Award, winner: Aboriginal Recording of the Year, Spiritual Recording of the Year and World Recording of the Year.
- December 2016, Member of the Order of Canada recipient.
- 2017 Juno Awards, winner: Classical Album of the Year - Large Ensemble, Going Home Star
- 2019 Indigenous Voices Award for prose published in English, Split Tooth
- 2023 Gordon Burn prize, nominee: Split Tooth

== Discography ==
List of studio albums, with awards and nominations
Title	Album details	Nominations and awards
Sinaa	Released: 2005; Label: Jericho Beach Music; Producers: Juan Hernández, Björk, Tanya Tagaq (executive producer)	Shortlisted for Aboriginal Recording of the Year, 2006 Juno Awards
Auk/Blood (ᐊᐅᒃ)	Released: 2008; Label: Jericho Beach Music; Label: Ipecac Recordings (United States)	
Animism	Released: May 27, 2014; Label: Six Shooter Records; Producer: Jesse Zubot	Winner of the 2014 Polaris Music Prize; Winner of the Juno Award for Aboriginal Album of the Year; Shortlisted nominee for Juno Award for Alternative Album of the Year.
Retribution	Released: October 21, 2016; Label: Six Shooter Records	Longlisted for 2017 Polaris Prize; Nominated for a 2018 Juno Award for Alternative Album of the Year.
Toothsayer	EP, 5 titles, 24 minutes; Released: March 1, 2019; Label: Six Shooter Records	
Tongues	Released: 2022; Label: Six Shooter Records	
Saputjiji	Released: March 6, 2026; Label: Six Shooter Records	

List of live albums
Title	Album details
Anuraaqtuq	Released: 2011; Label: Les Disques VICTO

=== Collaborations ===
- Going Home Star (2015)

== See also ==
- Indigenous Canadian personalities
- Sounds from the Ground
