= Keith Peterson =

Canadian politician

Member of the Nunavut MLA for Cambridge Bay
- In office February 16, 2004 – November 21, 2017
- Preceded by: Kelvin Ng
- Succeeded by: Jeannie Ehaloak

Personal details
- Born: February 2, 1956 (age 70) Whitehorse, Yukon
- Party: Non-partisan consensus government

Alan Keith Peterson (born February 2, 1956) was born in Whitehorse, Yukon, Canada and lives in Cambridge Bay, Nunavut. He was the [Member of the Nunavut MLA] for the electoral district of Cambridge Bay having won the seat in the 2004 Nunavut general election. He was re-elected in the 2008 and 2013 elections.

Between November 2008 and November 2017 he served nine years as the Finance Minister and Financial Management Board Chairman while serving concurrent terms as Minister of Justice / Attorney General for almost five years; Minister of the Nunavut Workers Safety & Compensation Commission for five years; and Health Minister for two years. During his terms as the Minister of Finance and the Minister of Justice, Peterson also held responsibility for the Public Service Act (Human Resources); Nunavut Liquor Commission; Nunavut Liquor Licensing Board; RCMP; Nunavut Corrections Services; Nunavut Legal Services Board; and the Labour Standards Board. He was Nunavut's first Minister of Democratic Institutions. Peterson was also Minister Responsible for the Qulliq Energy Corporation for one year.

Peterson is Canada's longest-serving finance minister.

Peterson decided not to run in the 2017 election.

Peterson has resided permanently in Cambridge Bay since 1973. Peterson attended F.H. Collins Secondary School in Whitehorse and graduated from Sir John Franklin High School in Yellowknife, Northwest Territories. He holds a Bachelor of Commerce degree from the University of Alberta in Edmonton.

Before becoming a MLA in the Legislative Assembly of Nunavut Peterson was a two-term mayor of Cambridge Bay, between January 2000 and December 2003. From March 2000 until December 2003 he served as the Kitikmeot director on the Nunavut Association of Municipalities (NAM). He was subsequently elected by the Nunavut mayors as vice-president, and then president of the NAM. He was involved with municipal governments since first being elected in 1984 serving as either a councillor or as deputy mayor.

During the 1980s Peterson was employed by the Government of the Northwest Territories (GNWT) in the Department of Economic Development and Tourism, delivering government business programs and services to individuals and businesses in the Kitikmeot.

In 1991, Peterson was instrumental in establishing and managing the Kitikmeot Regional Community Economic Development Organization, an Inuit community economic development organization (CEDO). This organization later became the Kitikmeot Economic Development Commission. The organization helps Kitikmeot Inuit and communities with business and training initiatives. In 1994 the Nunavut Inuit CEDO's created the Nunavut CEDO to represent them on pan-territorial and national CEDO issues. He played a key role in establishing the Nunavut CEDO and managed this organization until 2002.

In 1991, Peterson was appointed to the Kitikmeot Corporation board of directors and served as Secretary-Treasurer and Director until 2002. The Kitikmeot Corporation is the wholly owned Inuit Birthright development corporation of the Kitikmeot Inuit Association. They invest land claims payments in business ventures to create economic wealth for Kitikmeot Inuit. From 1991 until 2004 Peterson provided political, social and business advice to the Kitikmeot Inuit Association. He was the KIA's lead negotiator for benefits agreements with Northwest Territories and Nunavut based mines, including Echo Bay Mines (Lupin Mine), Tahera Diamonds (Jericho Diamond Mine), Miramar Gold Mine (until he was elected MLA), BHP Ekati (Ekati Diamond Mine), and Diavik Diamond Mine. He was a member of the NWT Business Credit Corporation for six years from 1993 to 1999, ending when Nunavut was created.

He is a past chairman of the Kitikmeot Law Centre; he was an appeals chairman for the GNWT and Union of Northern Workers; and is a former president of Local X007 for the Kitikmeot.
