= Toothsayer =

EP by Tanya Tagaq
- Released: March 1, 2019
- Genre: Inuit throat singing
- Length: 25:01
- Label: Six Shooter
- Producer: Jean Martin

Tanya Tagaq chronology
Retribution (2016)	Toothsayer (2019)

Singles from Toothsayer
- 1. "Snowblind" Released: January 16, 2019

Professional ratings
Aggregate scores
Source	Rating
Metacritic	86/100
Review scores
Source	Rating
NOW	4/5 stars
Pitchfork	7.6/10

Toothsayer is an EP album by Canadian Inuk musician Tanya Tagaq. It was released on March 1, 2019 through Six Shooter Records.

== Track listing ==
No.	Title	Length
1.	"Icebreaker"	6:45
2.	"Snowblind"	3:50
3.	"Toothsayer"	4:21
4.	"Submerged"	5:28
5.	"Hypothermia"	4:32
