= Ernie Bernhardt =

Canadian politician

MLA for Kitikmeot, NT
- In office 1991–1993
- Preceded by: new district
- Succeeded by: Kelvin Ng

Personal details
- Born: 1944 (age 81–82)
- Party: non-partisan consensus government

Ernest Bernhardt (born c. 1944) is a former territorial level politician in Canada.

== Early life ==
Bernhardt was born in or around 1944. He lost his mother at 10 months old, and his siblings and a nun cared for him afterwards. His father was a hunter and trapper. Bernhardt had to attend an Immaculate Conception Indian Residential School in Aklavik, Northwest Territories, then moved at age 15 to Akaitcho Hall residential school in Yellowknife in 1959 and Grandin College in Fort Smith at age 18. He learned trapping muskrat from the boy scouts group during his time at the Immaculate Conception school. He sold thousands of dollars' worth of muskrats he trapped; the school and the church took all the money he made. He also learned oil painting and boxing at the school. While at Grandin College, he applied to study in Kugluktuk to be with his father.

He learned Arctic sports from Edward Lennie and later was hired to be the coordinator for the sport. He performed the one-handed leg-kick at the 1976 Summer Olympics in Montreal. He coached Arctic sports for Kugluktuk High School.

== Political career ==
Bernhardt was first elected to the Northwest Territories Legislature in the Kitikmeot district in the 1991 Northwest Territories general election, defeating Kelvin Ng and three others. He resigned mid-term in 1993 which Ng won in the subsequent by-election. Bernhardt faced off Ng again in the same district in the 1995 Northwest Territories general election but was defeated by Ng.

In November 2009, Bernhardt was acclaimed as mayor of Kugluktuk, saying that he wished to maintain a "unified municipal council." Bernhardt was sworn in on December 7, 2009.

== Personal life ==
Bernhardt is married to his wife Beatrice. He has an older sister, Wilma. As of May 2022, he resides in Yellowknife.

Legislative Assembly of the Northwest Territories
Preceded by New District	MLA Kitikmeot; 1991-1993	Succeeded by Kelvin Ng
