= Solids (band) =

Solids were a Canadian punk rock band from Montreal, Quebec, active in the 2010s.

Consisting of singer and guitarist Xavier Germain Poitras and drummer Louis Guillemette, the duo released their sole full-length album Blame Confusion on Fat Possum Records in 2014. The album was longlisted for the 2014 Polaris Music Prize.

They subsequently added Guillaume Chiasson as a second guitarist, and followed up in 2016 with the EP Else.

Their only further recording after Else was a cover of Daniel Johnston's "Silly Love", which they had recorded in 2010 but did not release until 2019, when they released it to Bandcamp as a charity single the day after Johnston's death.
