= Ekalluk River =

River in Nunavut, Canada

- Location within Nunavut Location within Canada

Location
- Country: Canada

Physical characteristics
- Source
  - location: Tahiryuaq
  - coordinates: 69°24′N 106°18′W
- Mouth
  - location: Wellington Bay; Albert Edward Bay
  - elevation: Sea level

The Ekalluk River (variations: Ekalluktok, Ekaluktuuk, Ekaluk) is a river in the Kitikmeot Region, Nunavut, Canada. It is located in central through southeastern Victoria Island. Its source is Tahiryuaq (Ferguson Lake); it flows west to Wellington Bay and east to Albert Edward Bay. Nearby lakes include Keyhole Lake, Kitigaq, and Surrey Lake. The closest community is Cambridge Bay.

The people of the Ekalluk River area are called Ekalluktogmiut, a geographically defined Copper Inuit subgroup.

== Iqaluktuuq ==
"There is a huge Arctic char run in the (Iqaluktuuq) river in August, and in fall, large caribou herds migrate southward across this river. Because of these resources, everyone who has ever lived there has been drawn to this one tiny area like a magnet. There is nothing like it for hundreds of kilometres." (Max Friesen, University of Toronto archaeologist, 2005)

—

The short span of the Ekalluk River that flows west from Tahiryuaq into eastern Wellington Bay is named Iqaluktuuq (Inuinnaqtun, meaning 'place of big fish'). Having been inhabited for the last 4,000 years by Tuniit and Inuit, it is an important Nunavut archaeological area. The Iqaluktuuq is a source of char-fishing and caribou-hunting for local residents.

The people of Iqaluktuuq are called Iqaluktuurmiut.

== See also ==
- List of rivers of Nunavut
