= Freedom Writers (band) =

Freedom Writers are a Canadian hip hop collective from Toronto, Ontario, whose debut album Now was a longlisted nominee for the 2014 Polaris Music Prize.

The members of the collective are rappers Theo 3, Tona, Adam Bomb, Frankie Payne and Progress, and producer Big Sproxx.

They released Now in 2013, and followed up with Again in 2017.

Several of the members have also recorded and performed as solo artists, and Adam Bomb and Tona have been associated with Naturally Born Strangers.
