= Qikiqtagafaaluk =

Island off the coast of Canada

- Location within Nunavut Location within Canada

Geography
- Location: Victoria Strait
- Coordinates: 69°29′08″N 101°08′56″W
- Archipelago: Arctic Archipelago
- Area: 171 km^{2} (66 sq mi)
- Length: 24.9 km (15.47 mi)
- Width: 9–18 km (5.6–11.2 mi)

Administration
- Canada
- Nunavut: Nunavut
- Region: Kitikmeot

Demographics
- Population: Uninhabited
- Ethnic groups: Inuit

Qikiqtagafaaluk, formerly Admiralty Island, is an uninhabited, irregularly shaped Arctic island in the Kitikmeot Region of Nunavut, Canada. It is located in the Victoria Strait, south of Victoria Island's Collinson Peninsula.
