= CFBI-FM =

- Cambridge Bay, Nunavut; Canada
- Frequency: 97.7 MHz

Ownership
- Owner: Cambridge Bay Communications Society

History
- First air date: August 14, 2001

Technical information
- Licensing authority: CRTC
- ERP: 31 watts
- HAAT: 28.7 metres (94 ft)
- Transmitter coordinates: 69°07′05″N 105°03′27″W

Links
- Website: cfbiradio.com

CFBI-FM is a Canadian radio station, broadcasting at 97.7 FM in Cambridge Bay, Nunavut. The station airs a community radio format with programming in both English and Inuinnaqtun.
