= Pam Gross =

Canadian politician

The Honourable Pamela Gross
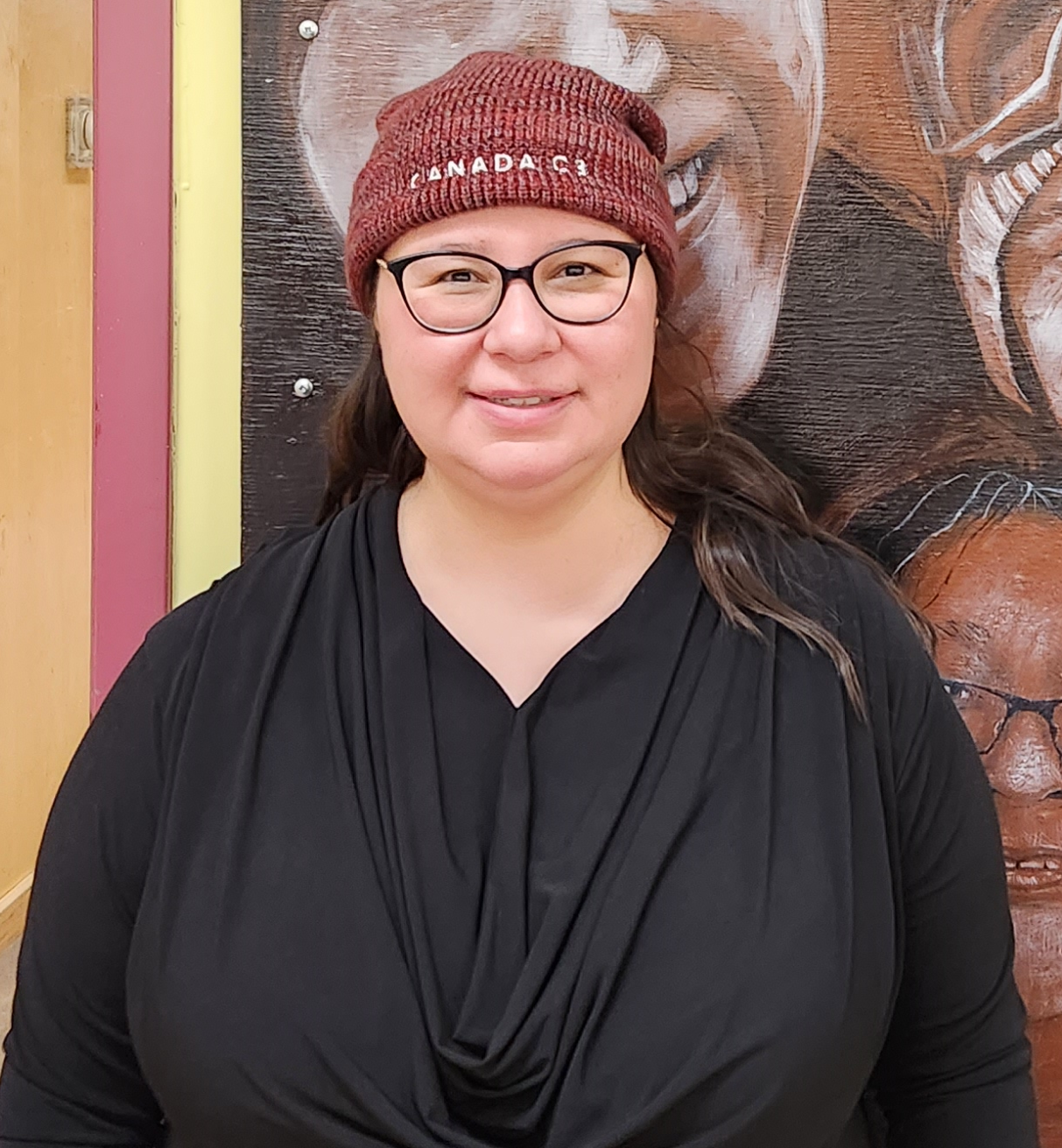
- Gross in 2023

Deputy Premier of Nunavut
- In office November 20, 2021 – November 20, 2025
- Premier: P.J. Akeeagok
- Preceded by: David Akeeagok
- Succeeded by: George Hickes

Member of the Legislative Assembly of Nunavut for Cambridge Bay
- In office November 19, 2021 – October 27, 2025
- Preceded by: Jeannie Ehaloak
- Succeeded by: Fred Pedersen

Personal details
- Born: Yellowknife, Northwest Territories, Canada
- Party: non-partisan consensus government

Pamela Hakongak Gross, usually known as Pam Gross is a Canadian Inuk politician, who was elected to the Legislative Assembly of Nunavut in the 2021 Nunavut general election. She represented the electoral district of Cambridge Bay until her defeat in 2025. In 2021, she became the deputy premier of Nunavut. In April 2026, she was named the CEO of the Kitikmeot Inuit Association.
