= Kelvin Ng =

Canadian politician

MLA for Kitikmeot, Northwest Territories
- In office 1993–1999
- Preceded by: Ernest Bernhardt
- Succeeded by: riding dissolved

MLA for Cambridge Bay, Nunavut
- In office 1999–2004
- Preceded by: riding created
- Succeeded by: Keith Peterson

Personal details
- Born: November 10, 1958 (age 67) Vancouver, British Columbia
- Party: non-partisan consensus government

Kelvin Ng (born November 10, 1958) is a former territorial and municipal level politician in Canada who was elected in both the Nunavut Legislature and Northwest Territories Legislature.

== Early life ==
Ng grew up in Vancouver and studied accounting at Vancouver City College. He moved to Cambridge Bay, Nunavut in 1978 to work for Hudson's Bay Company.

== Political career ==
Ng began his political career on the municipal level. He has served on municipal council between 1979 and 1987 and as Mayor of Cambridge Bay from 1988 to 1993.

Ng first ran in territorial election against Ernie Bernhardt for the Kitikmeot electoral district but was defeated by Bernhardt in the 1991 Northwest Territories general election. Ng won in the 1993 by-election to fill the vacancy for Kitikmeot after a mid-term resignation by Bernhardt. Bernhardt and Ng faced each other again in this district in the 1995 Northwest Territories general election. He defeated Bernhardt and was re-elected. Ng served one term in the Northwest Territories Legislature, becoming a cabinet minister for health and social services in the government. His district was abolished in 1999 when Nunavut was created from the Northwest Territories.

Ng ran for a seat to the Legislative Assembly of Nunavut in the first general election held in 1999. Ng won the Cambridge Bay electoral district, and was appointed to the cabinet as the first Minister of Finance for the territory. He served one term before retiring in 2004 at the dissolution of the legislature to devote more time to his family.
