= Sinaa =

Studio album by Tagaq
- Released: 2005
- Recorded: 2004/2005
- Genre: A Cappella; Inuit throat singing folk music
- Length: 41:14
- Label: Jericho Beach Music
- Producer: Juan Hernández, Björk, Tanya Tagaq (executive producer)

Tagaq chronology
Sinaa (2005)	Auk/Blood (2008)

Sinaa is the first full-length studio album from Inuk throat singer Tagaq. The album was released in 2005 on her official website and later in stores. The album is mainly all vocals with some instruments in the background. The album is mainly composed of Tanya's vocals and other throat singers like Felipe Ugarte.

Björk performs on the track "Ancestors", which also appears on her own album Medúlla.

The album was nominated for Aboriginal Recording of the Year at the 2006 Juno Awards, but did not win.

== Track listing ==
No.	Title	Length
1.	"Sila"	3:28
2.	"Still"	3:11
3.	"Qimmiruluapik"	2:02
4.	"Qiujaviit"	3:04
5.	"Surge"	3:24
6.	"Ancestors"	4:08
7.	"Uvinik"	2:54
8.	"Illunikavi"	3:02
9.	"Seamless"	3:01
10.	"Origin"	2:42
11.	"Suluk"	3:50
12.	"Breather"	5:27

Track 12's run time is listed as above on the back cover, but the track on the CD is 10:35, consisting of "Breather," followed by 4:31 of silence, and then a 37-second piece including the voice of her baby daughter Naia.
