= Spring Breakup (band) =

- Origin: Whitehorse, Yukon, Canada
- Genres: Folk
- Years active: 2009–present
- Label: Label Fantastic!
- Members: Mathias Kom; Kim Barlow
- Website: springbreakupmusic.com

Spring Breakup is a Canadian folk duo consisting of Juno-nominated banjo player Kim Barlow, and Mathias Kom of The Burning Hell. The duo formed in the winter of 2009 in Whitehorse, Yukon, Canada. Most of Spring Breakup's songs are about romantic breakups. Their album It's Not You, It's Me was released 1 February 2011 on Guelph's Label Fantastic!.

== Discography ==
=== Albums ===
- Spring Breakup (2009)
- It's Not You, It's Me (2011)

== See also ==
- Music of Canada
- List of bands from Canada
- List of Canadian musicians
