= Finlayson Islands =

Canadian archipelago

- Location within Nunavut Location within Canada

Geography
- Location: Dease Strait
- Coordinates: 69°4′59″N 105°58′0″W
- Archipelago: Canadian Arctic Archipelago
- Area: 8 km^{2} (3.1 sq mi)
- Highest elevation: 160 ft (49 m)
- Highest point: Unnamed

Administration
- Canada
- Territories: Nunavut
- Region: Kitikmeot

Demographics
- Population: uninhabited

The Finlayson Islands are a string of Canadian arctic islands in Nunavut, Canada. The group lies in Dease Strait, approximately 19 kilometres (12 mi) from Cape Alexander, south of Victoria Island and north of the mainland's Kent Peninsula. The community of Cambridge Bay is approximately 23 mi (37 km) to the east.

An early survey was made by Sir Richard Collinson on board the Enterprise during his search for Sir John Franklin's lost expedition. Collinson noted the islands to be a basalt ridge running south-southeast. The largest measures 2 sq mi (5.18 km^{2}) long by .75 sq mi (1.94 km^{2}) wide.

Colonies of Thayer's gull and glaucous gull are located on one of the larger islands.

== See also ==
- List of islands of Canada
