= Wellington Bay =

Bay in Nunavut, Canada

- Location within Nunavut
- Location: Dease Strait
- Coordinates: 69°20′N 106°35′W
- River sources: Ekalluk River; Halokvik; Paliryuak
- Ocean/sea sources: Arctic Ocean
- Basin countries: Canada
- Settlements: Uninhabited

Wellington Bay is an Arctic waterway in Kitikmeot Region, Nunavut, Canada. It is located in Dease Strait, off southern Victoria Island. It is about 65 km (40 mi) northwest of the community of Cambridge Bay.

It is one of several Canadian landforms named in honour of Arthur Wellesley, 1st Duke of Wellington.

== Geography ==
There are several small islands within the bay. Several rivers flow into it including the Ekalluk River, Paliryuak (Surrey River), and Halokvik River (Halovik or Thirty-Mile River).

== Fauna ==
Commercial fishing activities include Arctic char.
