= Ndidi Onukwulu =

Canadian singer

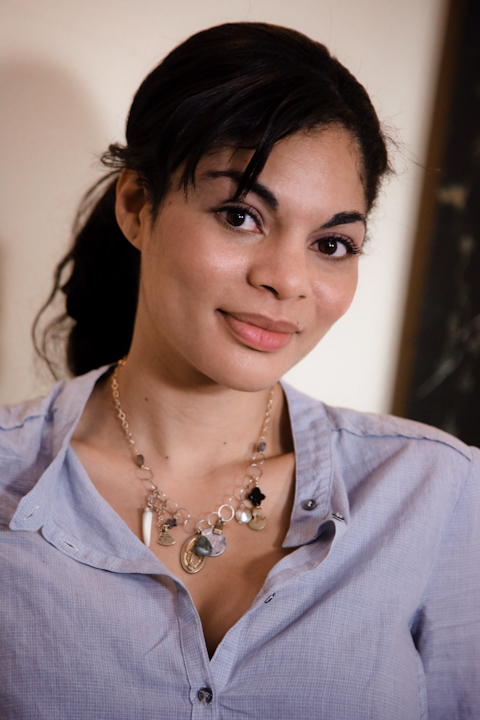
- Onukwulu in Paris

Background information
- Also known as: Ndidi O
- Born: 1988 (age 36–37)
- Genres: Blues; rock; electric blues; country; gospel
- Occupations: Musician; singer-songwriter
- Instruments: Vocals; guitar; piano
- Years active: 2005 – present
- Website: http://www.ndidio.ca/

Ndidi Onukwulu (born 1988) is a Canadian singer-songwriter born in British Columbia. Although her style is often classified as jazz and blues, Onukwulu combines several musical genres in her songs including surf music, electric blues, gospel, and country. She has frequently toured across Canada and Europe in support of her records.

== Life ==
Born in 1988, Onukwulu lacked any interest in music while young. She did not consider a career as a singer until her friends heard her sing in her early adult years. She moved to New York City, where she sang on the open-mic circuit. During her time in New York, she met several hip-hop and blues musicians who influenced her atypical style. Next Onukwulu moved to Toronto where she first became a member of a rock band. Later, she joined the electronica group Stop Die Resuscitate. Eventually, Onukwulu moved back to a more definitively blues style and began performing at prominent venues including Massey Hall in Toronto. In January 2006 Onukwulu, aged 18, released her first album No, I Never. The album release was followed by a tour that garnered positive buzz in the Canadian blues community.

Following a bad break-up in December 2006, Onukwulu spent 2007 composing new music. In addition to drawing on the experiences of her relationship, she found inspiration by visiting cemeteries and imagining stories for the deceased people whose graves she visited. Onukwulu united the ideas of death and the end of relationships to create the eclectic music featured on her second album The Contradictor. This album introduced the more diverse styles for which she is now known. The album got its name from the contradiction between the upbeat music and its more serious themes, in addition to elements of the singer's own personality. The Contradictor, released on June 17, 2008, was produced by Steve Dawson under the indie record label Jericho Beach Music. She then went on to Europe, where she signed a deal with Universal Jazz and Classics France and went on to write and record two additional albums The Escape (2011) and Dark Swing (2014).

== Discography ==
Album	Release date	Song title
No I Never	January 2, 2006	"Horn Blower"
		"Water"
		"Wicked Lady"
		"Hey There"
		"Hush"
		"Weight"
		"May Be the Last Time, I Don't Know"
		"Seen You Before"
		"Old Heart"
		"Home"
		"Long Way Home"
Saturday Night Blues: 20 Years	November 28, 2006	"Come on Home"
The Contradictor	June 17, 2008	"SK Final"
		"The Lady and E"
		"Forever SZ"
		"Almost JD"
		"Goodnight JF"
		"Move Together"
		"No Everybody"
		"Her House is Empty KH"
		"Boogie MB"
		"Cry All Day"
		"Rise"
		"He Needs Me"
The Escape	May 2011	"The Whisper" (single)
		"On The Metro"
		"Around The Corner"
		"Kissing on a Bridge"
		"Crossing The Line"
		"Old Road"
		"The Escape"
		"Little Dream"
		"Waiting for a Sign"
		"It Isn't You"
		"Heart of Steel"
		"Under The Sky"
Dark Swing	February 2014	"How Long"
		"Engine Gone Cold"
		"Once Again"
		"Sit Down"
		"Love And Laughter"
		"Don't Come Around Here"
		"Sugarman"
		"Last of the Pure"
		"Why Can't You Be Mine"
		"Dark Swing"
These Days	March 16, 2018	"Hands High"
		"What I Want"
		"No Mercy"
		"Baby Please"
		"Maybe"
		"Before You"
		"Lament"
		"Death Letter"
		"Daggers"
		"Rise Up"
		"Don't"
		"Bring Me Back"
These Days	March 16, 2018	"Hands High"
		"What I Want"
		"No Mercy"
		"Baby Please"
		"Maybe"
		"Before You"
		"Lament"
		"Death Letter"
		"Daggers"
		"Rise Up"
		"Don't"
Simple Songs For Complicated Times	April 19, 2024	"Get Gone"
		"Oh Death"
		"Light On"
		"So Cold"
		"Don't Come Back"
		"In May"
		"Change This Life"
		"Too Late"
		"Grief"
		"Working Girl"
		"Worth"

== See also ==
- Madagascar Slim
- Vancouver Folk Music Festival
