= Derek Charke =

Canadian classical composer and flutist

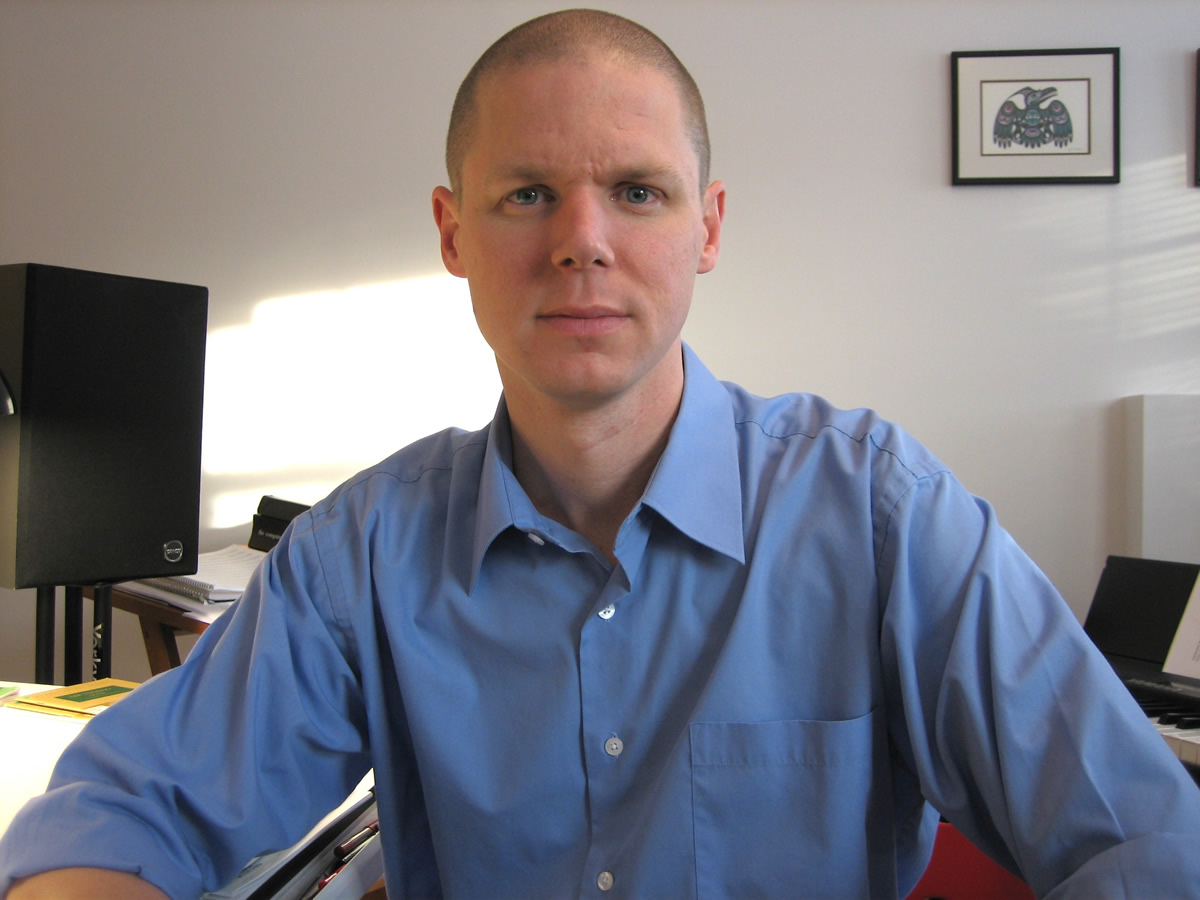
Derek Charke in 2009

Derek Charke (/tʃɑːrk/; born 1974) is a Canadian classical composer and flutist.

== Career ==
In 2012, Derek Charke won the Juno Award for Classical Composition of the Year for his work, "Sepia Fragments." The following year Charke's work, "Between the Shore and the Ships" received an ECMA for Classical Composition of the Year. Derek's compositions increasingly pair electroacoustic elements—many of which are derived from environmental sounds—with acoustic instruments. Ecological sound as an artistic statement on environmental issues has become an impetus for many works, and his interest in the Arctic has like-wise played a role in many of his compositions. His music bridges a divide between this play of pure sound, collecting natural and environmental sound, and a continuation of the Western "classical" tradition—albeit with contemporary and popular influences.

Derek Charke earned his bachelor's degree in composition at the University of North Texas, a master's degree in composition from the Royal Academy of Music, a master's degree in flute and a doctorate degree in composition from the University at Buffalo. While at Buffalo he studied composition with David Felder and flute with Cheryl Gobbetti Hoffman. Previous composition teachers included Louis Andriessen, Steve Martland and Cindy McTee.

Charke is currently an associate professor of music theory and composition at Acadia University School of Music in Nova Scotia, Canada. Charke is also co-director of the Acadia New Music Society, and he actively performs as both a soloist and new music improvisor on the flute. In addition to his responsibilities as a full professor at Acadia University, Charke is an associate composer of the Canadian Music Centre (CMC).

To date, Charke has received numerous awards and commissions, including a BMI student composer award for his work Xynith, the Outstanding Undergraduate Award in Composition from the University of North Texas, and an honorable mention from the Kubik Prize for his composition What do the Birds Think? Charke has been commissioned by ensembles such as Duo Turgeon, the Kronos Quartet, the Toronto Symphony Orchestra, the Winnipeg Symphony Orchestra, and the St. Lawrence String Quartet. Dr. Charke and his wife currently live in Kentville, Nova Scotia.

== Discography ==
- 2010 – Sea to Sea (St. Lawrence String Quartet Centrediscs / Centredisques CD-CMCCD 16310) (Includes Sepia fragments)
- 2011 – A Canadian Music Sampler: Centrediscs 30 Years (Centrediscs / Centredisques CD-CMCCD 17311) (Includes Sepia fragments)
- 2012 – ...Between the Shore and the Ships... (Centrediscs / Centredisques CD-CMCCD 17912) (Includes Blizzard; Between the Shore and the Ships)
- Anderson, Chenoa. Krishna's Flute. Brent Lee, Derek Charke, Ian Crutchley, Keith Hamel, John Oliver, & W.L. Altman. Earsay Productions, 2014. CD.
- Charke, Derek. In Sonorous Falling Tones. Derek Charke (soloist) and WIRED! Ensemble. Mark Hopkins. Centrediscs, CD-CMCCD 23917, 2017. CD.
- Charke, Derek., et al. Kitchen Party. Derek Charke & Mark Adam. Centrediscs, 2014. CD.
- Charke, Derek. Live Wired. NBG Ensemble and Acadia University Wind Ensemble. Mark Hopkins. Canadian Music Centre Distribution Service, CD-ANMS 001, 2015. CD.
- Charke, Derek. Tundra Songs. Tanya Tagaq & Kronos Quartet. Centrediscs, CD-CMCCD 21015, 2015. CD.
