= Animism (album) =

Studio album by Tanya Tagaq
- Released: May 27, 2014
- Genre: Inuit throat singing
- Length: 49:02
- Label: Six Shooter Records
- Producer: Jesse Zubot

Tanya Tagaq chronology
Anuraaqtuq (2011)	Animism (2014)	Retribution (2016)

Professional ratings
Review scores
Source	Rating
PopMatters	8/10 stars
The Quietus	Positive
Songlines	4/5 stars
The Skinny	2/5 stars
Clash	7/10

Animism is the third studio album by Canadian Inuk musician Tanya Tagaq, released May 27, 2014 on Six Shooter Records. The album won the 2014 Polaris Music Prize on September 22, 2014, and the Juno Award for Aboriginal Album of the Year at the Juno Awards of 2015. It was also a shortlisted nominee for the Juno Award for Alternative Album of the Year, but did not win.

Tagaq has described the album as more consciously political than her earlier work. The political themes culminate in the album's final track, "Fracking", in which Tagaq vocalizes the Earth's cries of pain as it is subjected to hydraulic fracturing. Cyborg Feminist writer Donna Haraway discussed the album in her work Staying With The Trouble where she argued that Animism "embraced oppositions and conflicts, not to purify them, but to live inside complexities of shared flesh."

The album was produced by Jesse Zubot, and features musical contributions from percussionist Jean Martin and opera singer Anna Pardo Canedo. In addition to the album's Juno Award nominations, Zubot was a nominee for Producer of the Year for the album tracks "Caribou" and "Uja".

"Caribou" is a cover of a song by noted American alternative rock band Pixies.

== Track listing ==
No.	Title	Writer(s)	Length
1.	"Caribou"	Charles Thompson	4:53
2.	"Uja"	Tanya Tagaq Gillis; Jesse Zubot; Jean Martin; Michael Red	2:49
3.	"Umingmak"	Tagaq; Zubot; Martin; Red	3:56
4.	"Genetic Memory"	Tagaq; Zubot; Red	1:36
5.	"Rabbit"	Tagaq; Zubot; Martin; Red	4:05
6.	"Tulugak"	Tagaq; Zubot; Martin	8:57
7.	"Howl"	Tagaq; Zubot; Red	3:10
8.	"Flight"	Tagaq; Anna Pardo Canedo	4:40
9.	"Fight"	Tagaq; Zubot; Martin; Red	3:29
10.	"Damp Animal Spirits"	Tagaq; Zubot; Martin	7:23
11.	"Fracking"	Tagaq; Zubot	4:02

Six Shooter also released a single-LP edition on coloured vinyl, consisting of tracks 1, 3, 5, 6, 2, 7, 10 and 11, in that order, with four songs on each side.
