= Jericho Beach Music =

- Parent company: Festival Distribution
- Founded: 1997
- Founder: Jack Schuller
- Distributor: Festival Distribution
- Genre: World music, folk, jazz
- Country of origin: Canada
- Location: Vancouver, British Columbia
- Official website: maplemusic.com

Jericho Beach Music is a record label in Vancouver, British Columbia that specializes in world music, folk, and jazz. It was named after Jericho Beach in Vancouver. The label was formed in 1997 and released its first album, Compadres by James Keelaghan and Oscar Lopez. It is an imprint of Festival Distribution.

== Roster ==
- Kim Barlow
- Geoff Berner
- Eric Bibb
- Lache Cerce
- Alpha Yaya Diallo
- Digging Roots
- e.S.L.
- David Francey
- Martyn Joseph
- James Keelaghan
- Khac Chi Ensemble
- Ndidi Onukwulu
- Po' Girl
- Silk Road Music
- Tanya Tagaq
- The Wailin' Jennys

== See also ==
- List of record labels
