= Auk/Blood =

Studio album by Tanya Tagaq
- Released: 2008
- Genre: Inuit throat singing
- Length: 52:13
- Label: Ipecac Recordings (CD) (IPC-107)
- Producer: Tagaq

Tanya Tagaq chronology
Sinaa (2005)	Auk/Blood (2008)	Anuraaqtuq (2011)

Professional ratings
Review scores
Source	Rating
PopMatters	6/10

Auk/Blood (Inuktitut syllabics: ᐊᐅᒃ) is an album by Tanya Tagaq, released in 2008 by Ipecac Recordings.

== Track listing ==
All tracks written by Tagaq.

1. "Fox - Tiriganiak" – 3:45
2. "Fire - Ikuma" – 5:07
3. "Growth" – 5:27
4. "Gentle" – 4:52
5. "Tategak" – 5:41
6. "Force" – 3:22
7. "Growl" – 2:27
8. "Want" – 3:11
9. "Hunger" – 6:33
10. "Burst" – 3:25
11. "Blood - Auk" – 3:23
12. "Construction" – 2:10
13. "Sinialuk" – 2:50

== See also ==
- ᐃᑯᒪ, transliterates to "Ikuma" or "fire".
