= 2014 Polaris Music Prize =

Annual Canadian music award ceremony

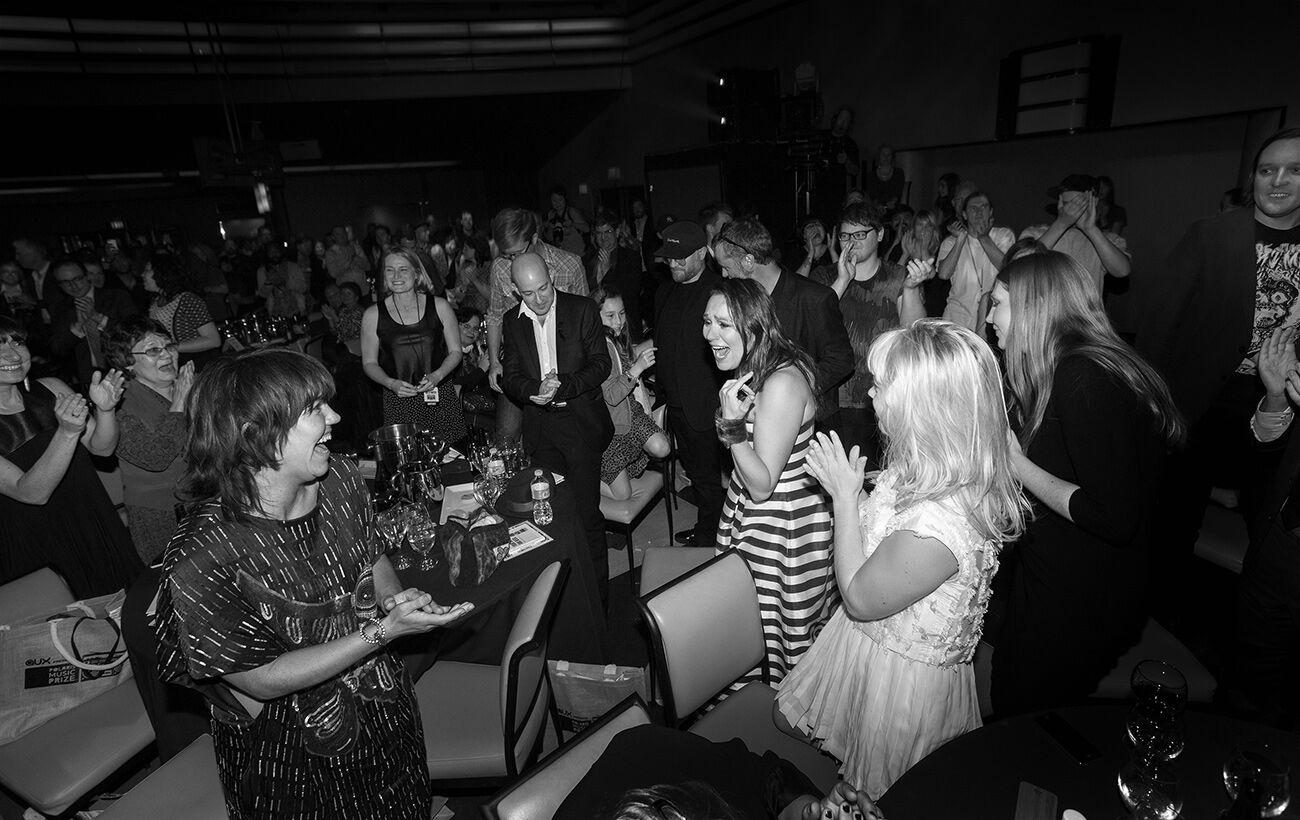
Tanya Tagaq wins 2014 Polaris Prize

The 2014 edition of the Canadian Polaris Music Prize was presented on September 22, 2014, at The Carlu event theatre in Toronto, Ontario. Actor Jay Baruchel was the host of the ceremony.

The grand jury for the 2014 award consisted of Adam Bowie of The Daily Gleaner, Lorraine Carpenter of CultMTL, Stephen Cooke of the Chronicle-Herald, Jessica Émond-Ferrat of Métro's Montreal edition, Luke Fox of Exclaim!, Melody Lau of Much, Julia LeConte of NOW, Stephanie McKay of the Saskatoon Star-Phoenix, Mark Teo of Aux, and freelance music journalists Liisa Ladouceur and Alan Ranta.

Tanya Tagaq won the award for her album Animism. During the gala before the award winner was announced, Tagaq had given what was widely considered the standout performance of the evening, performing in front of a scrolling list of names of missing and murdered Indigenous women, and garnering the event's only standing ovation.

== Shortlist ==
The ten-album shortlist was announced on July 15.

- Tanya Tagaq, Animism
- Arcade Fire, Reflektor
- Basia Bulat, Tall Tall Shadow
- Mac DeMarco, Salad Days
- Drake, Nothing Was the Same
- Jessy Lanza, Pull My Hair Back
- Owen Pallett, In Conflict
- Shad, Flying Colours
- Timber Timbre, Hot Dreams
- Yamantaka // Sonic Titan, UZU

== Longlist ==
The prize's preliminary 40-album longlist was announced on June 19 at the Sled Island festival in Calgary, Alberta. Nominations were announced by Dan Boeckner of Wolf Parade, Mark Sasso of Elliott Brood, broadcaster Dave Hodge and Calgary mayor Naheed Nenshi.

On June 24, the prize committee amended the longlist to include Greg MacPherson's album Fireball, announcing that the album had made the Top 40 in the voting but was erroneously omitted due to a tabulation error. The committee opted not to drop another album from the longlist to compensate for MacPherson's addition, and went into the second round of voting with a 41-album longlist.

- Arcade Fire, Reflektor
- AroarA, In the Pines
- Austra, Olympia
- Philippe B, Ornithologie, la nuit
- BadBadNotGood, III
- Basia Bulat, Tall Tall Shadow
- Chromeo, White Women
- Cousins, The Halls of Wickwire
- Cowboy Junkies, The Kennedy Suite
- The Darcys, Warring
- Dead Obies, Montréal $ud
- Mac DeMarco, Salad Days
- DIANA, Perpetual Surrender
- Drake, Nothing Was the Same
- Freedom Writers, NOW
- Fresh Snow, I
- Frog Eyes, Carey's Cold Spring
- Gorguts, Colored Sands
- Tim Hecker, Virgins
- Jimmy Hunt, Maladie d'amour
- Jessy Lanza, Pull My Hair Back
- Greg MacPherson, Fireball
- Kalle Mattson, Someday, The Moon Will Be Gold
- Moonface, Julia with Blue Jeans On
- Mounties, Thrash Rock Legacy
- Odonis Odonis, Hard Boiled Soft Boiled
- Owen Pallett, In Conflict
- Pink Mountaintops, Get Back
- PUP, PUP
- The Sadies, Internal Sounds
- Shad, Flying Colours
- Shooting Guns, Brotherhood of the Ram
- Solids, Blame Confusion
- Rae Spoon, My Prairie Home
- The Strumbellas, We Still Move On Dance Floors
- Tanya Tagaq, Animism
- Thus Owls, Turning Rocks
- Timber Timbre, Hot Dreams
- Chad VanGaalen, Shrink Dust
- Bry Webb, Free Will
- Yamantaka // Sonic Titan, UZU
