= Kim Barlow =

Canadian folk singer and musician

- Born: March 10, 1969 (age 57); Montreal, Quebec
- Genres: Folk
- Occupations: Singer, songwriter
- Instruments: Cello, clawhammer banjo, guitar
- Years active: 1999–present
- Labels: Caribou, Jericho Beach
- Website: kimbarlow.ca

Kim Barlow (born March 10, 1969) is a Canadian folk singer and musician.

== Biography ==
Barlow was born in Montreal, Quebec, and raised in rural Nova Scotia, she is of Anglo-Quebecker descent. She studied classical guitar at Florida State University before moving to the Yukon in the 1990s. In 2013 she left the Yukon so she could move back to Nova Scotia.

== Music career ==
Kim Barlow has released on the independent record label Caribou Records in Whitehorse, Yukon and on Jericho Beach Music in Vancouver. Her album Saplings (2010) was produced with Jean Martin of Barnyard Records in Toronto and Bob Hamilton at Old Crow Recording in Whitehorse.

She has toured across Canada and internationally as a solo artist and as part of the Pan Canadian New Folk Ensemble tour with Christine Fellows and Old Man Luedecke. She frequently collaborates with Mathias Kom of The Burning Hell in the side project Spring Breakup.

Her second album, Gingerbread, was a nominee for Roots and Traditional Album of the Year (Solo) at the Juno Awards of 2003.

In 2009, she recorded "Dawson City" for CBC Radio 2's Great Canadian Song Quest.

== Discography ==
- Humminah (Caribou, 1999)
- Gingerbread (Caribou, 2001)
- Luckyburden (Caribou, 2004)
- Champ (Jericho Beach, 2007)
- Saplings (2010)
- How To Let Go (2018)
