= Ekalluktogmiut =

Subgroup of Copper Inuit

The Ekalluktogmiut (also spelt Iqaluktuurmiutat and Ikaluktuurmiut) were a geographically defined Copper Inuit subgroup in Canada's Nunavut territory. They were located along the Ekalluk River near the center of Victoria Island, Albert Edward Bay in western Victoria Strait, and Denmark Bay. According to the Arctic explorer Vilhjalmur Stefansson, the Ekalluktogmiut winter hunt on Dease Strait.
