= Polar Knowledge Canada =

Department of the government of Canada

- Savoir polaire Canada
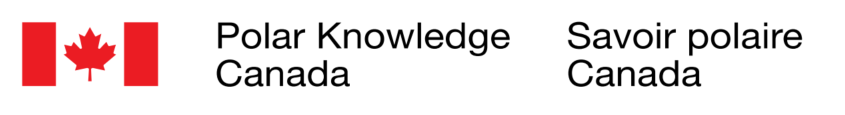

Departmental corporation overview
- Formed: June 1, 2015; September 9, 1991 (historic)
- Jurisdiction: Canada
- Headquarters: Cambridge Bay, Nunavut, Canada
- Employees: ~90
- Ministers responsible: Rebecca Alty, Minister of Crown–Indigenous Relations; Rebecca Chartrand, Minister of Northern and Arctic Affairs
- Departmental corporation executive: Jennifer C. Hubbard, President and CEO
- Parent department: Crown–Indigenous Relations and Northern Affairs Canada
- Website: www.canada.ca/en/polar-knowledge.html

Polar Knowledge Canada is a departmental corporation of the Government of Canada under the Crown–Indigenous Relations and Northern Affairs Canada (CIRNAC) portfolio.

It is responsible for monitoring, promoting, and disseminating knowledge of the polar regions (both Arctic and Antarctic), contributing to public awareness of the importance of polar science to Canada, enhancing Canada's international profile as a circumpolar nation, and recommending polar science policy direction to government.

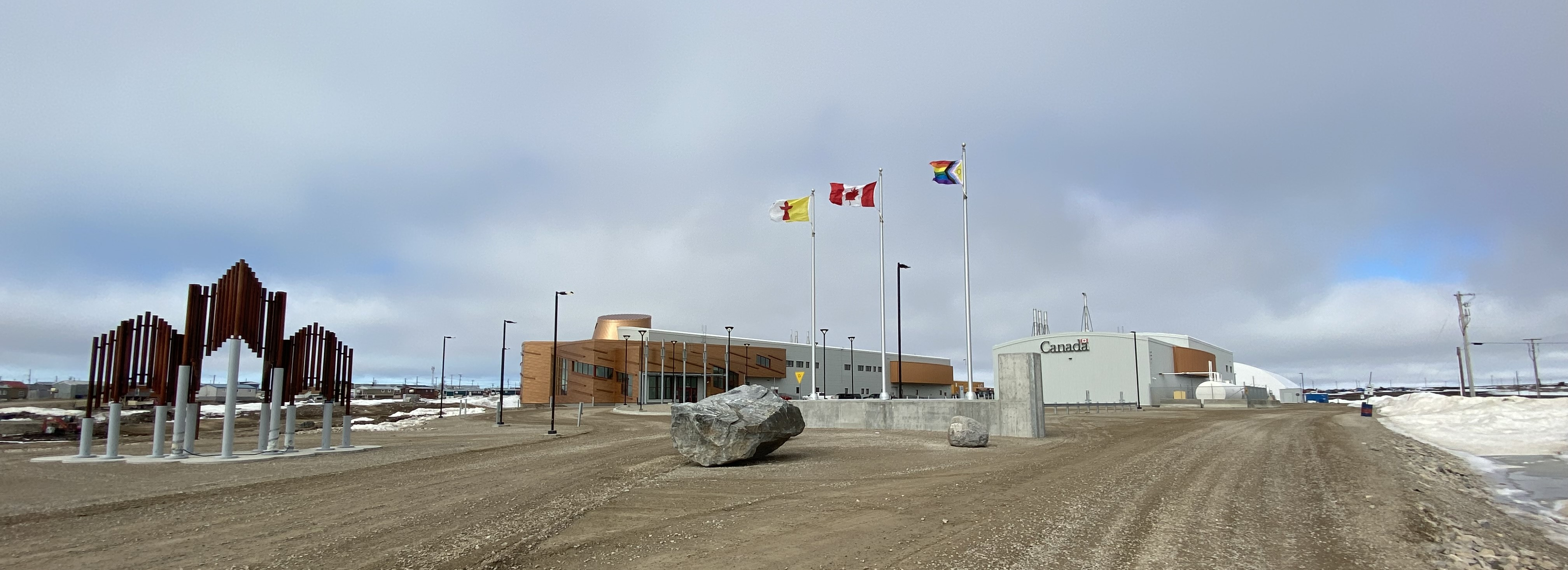
Canadian High Arctic Research Station

The organization was established when the former Canadian Polar Commission, formed in 1991, and the Arctic Science and Technology Directorate within CIRNAC that is responsible for Canadian High Arctic Research Station was merged into one unit under the Canadian High Arctic Research Station Act on June 1, 2015. Its main office is at the Canadian High Arctic Research Station in Cambridge Bay, Nunavut, which opened in August 2019.

== History ==
The Canadian Polar Commission was established on February 1, 1991 under the Canadian Polar Commission Act. The first meeting of the Commission was held in Yellowknife, Northwest Territories in November 1991. It later travelled to Nunavik and Nunavut to meet community representatives. From these meetings, the Commission identified long-term goals of the organization to monitor scientific research in polar science, monitor and report on research into northern economic development, promotion for the integration of traditional knowledge into polar research, communicate with the public about polar issues and conduct research projects on northern science, economics and social development.
