= E.S.L. (band) =

Canadian folk pop band

e.s.l.
- E.S.L. in 2016

Background information
- Origin: Vancouver, British Columbia
- Genre: Folk pop
- Years active: 2005–present
- Labels: Coax, Jericho Beach
- Members: Tess Kitchen; Diona Davies; Joy Mullen
- Past members: Cris Derksen; Marta Jaciubek-McKeever
- Website: eslband.wordpress.com

E.S.L. is a Canadian folk pop band from Vancouver, British Columbia. The current lineup is Marta Jaciubek-McKeever (previously of Fan Death), Diona Davies (of Geoff Berner's band and previously of Po' Girl), Tess Kitchen and Joy Mullen. The members have varied backgrounds that include playing with the "Vancouver Symphony Orchestra, punk bands, pop bands, hip hop and beyond."

Formed in 2005, the band features piano, violin, trumpet and drums, and all other members provide harmonies to lead singer Jaciubek-McKeever. The group released a full-length album, Eye Contact, in 2008. In May 2016, they released an EP, Heart Contact, to positive review. The CBC called the EP, "as big and small as the world, a comfort and a wonder to tuck inside one's self and share with everybody you know." And Ride the Tempo noted the group's "musicianship is impeccable throughout."

e.s.l. has performed at many notable Canadian festivals. 2012 saw the group perform at Vancouver Folk Music Festival alongside Dan Mangan and The Head and the Heart with a performance that "had the audience star-struck as they collaborated in a surreal way that included rapping about being baked, a shirt coming off and a cover of Rocky Raccoon."
