= Retribution (Tanya Tagaq album) =

Studio album by Tanya Tagaq
- Released: October 21, 2016
- Genre: Inuit throat singing
- Length: 47:28
- Label: Six Shooter Records

Tanya Tagaq chronology
Animism (2014)	Retribution (2016)

Retribution is the fourth studio album by Canadian Inuk musician Tanya Tagaq, which was released on October 21, 2016 on Six Shooter Records.

"Rape Me" is a cover of a song by American grunge band Nirvana. The album also features a collaboration with rapper Shad on the track "Centre", and Inuk artist Laakuluk Williamson Bathory on the track "Retribution".

The album was a longlisted nominee for the 2017 Polaris Music Prize.

Professional ratings
Aggregate scores
Source	Rating
Metacritic	80/100
Review scores
Source	Rating
Exclaim!	9/10
The Guardian	4/5 stars
Pitchfork	8.2/10
Rolling Stone	4/5 stars
Vice (Expert Witness)	A−

== Track listing ==
No.	Title	Writer(s)	Length
1.	"Ajaaja"	Tanya Tagaq Gillis, Roman Komangapik, Jesse Zubot	2:55
2.	"Retribution"	Tagaq, Jean Martin, Bernard Falaise, Zubot	7:57
3.	"Nacreous"	Tagaq, Radik Tyulyush, Christine Duncan, Zubot	4:01
4.	"Aorta"	Tagaq, Zubot, Martin	3:37
5.	"Centre"	Tagaq, Shadrach Kabango, Zubot, Martin, Falaise	3:51
6.	"Summoning"	Tagaq, Martin, Falaise, Zubot, Duncan	8:57
7.	"Cold"	Tagaq, Zubot, Tyulyush, Martin, Duncan	6:35
8.	"Sivulivinivut"	Tagaq, Zubot, Martin, Falaise	1:49
9.	"Sulfur"	Tagaq, Martin, Falaise, Zubot, Duncan	3:00
10.	"Rape Me"	Kurt Cobain	4:46
