= Collinson Peninsula =

Peninsula in Nunavut, Canada

Coordinates: 70°00′N 101°10′W

The Collinson Peninsula is located on eastern Victoria Island in Canada's Nunavut territory. The Storkenson Peninsula lies to the north, while M'Clintock Channel is to the east.

It is named after Richard Collinson, officer of the Royal Navy, and Arctic explorer who voyaged through this area in 1853.
