= Slingshot Professionals =

Studio album by Kelly Joe Phelps
- Released: 2003
- Recorded: Phase 1 Studios in Toronto, Canada; The Factory in Vancouver, British Columbia; Flora in Seattle, WA
- Genre: Blues, Americana, folk
- Length: 51:47
- Label: Rykodisc
- Producer: Lee Townsend

Kelly Joe Phelps chronology
Beggar's Oil (2002)	Slingshot Professionals (2003)	Tap the Red Cane Whirlwind (2005)

Slingshot Professionals is an album by American blues singer and guitarist Kelly Joe Phelps, released in 2003.

== History ==
Slingshot Professionals was Phelps' first album with producer Lee Townsend. Phelps is joined by guitarist Bill Frisell and bassist Keith Lowe on two tracks: "Not So Far to Go" and "Cardboard Box of Batteries," and the rest of the album features bassist Andrew Downing, as well as fiddler Jesse Zubot and guitarist Steve Dawson. Petra Haden (daughter of jazz musician Charlie Haden) whose album Townsend was producing at the time, harmonizes on one song.

== Reception ==
Professional ratings
Review scores
Source	Rating
AllMusic	4/5 stars
Uncut	4/5 stars

Music critic Mark Allan wrote in his AllMusic review that the album was "well worth a listen". Uncut wrote, "The transformation from revivalist bluesman to contemporary singer-songwriter, which began on 1999's Shine Eyed Mister Zen, continues apace on his fifth album. His songs are now mini stories, sans verse-chorus-bridge restraints, populated by seekers of truth and peddlers of dreams."

== Track listing ==
All songs written by Kelly Joe Phelps.

1. "Jericho" – 6:29
2. "Window Grin" – 3:50
3. "Slingshot Professionals" – 5:07
4. "Not So Far to Go" – 5:16
5. "It's James Now" – 4:22
6. "Waiting for Marty" – 5:05
7. "Knock Louder" – 4:24
8. "Cardboard Box of Batteries" – 5:18
9. "Circle Wars" – 7:05
10. "Rusting Gate" – 4:51

== Personnel ==
- Kelly Joe Phelps – vocals, guitar, harmonica
- Andrew Downing – acoustic bass
- Steve Dawson – Weissenborn lap steel guitar
- Bill Frisell – electric guitar
- Chris Gestrin – organ, piano, accordion
- Scott Amendola – drums, percussion, talking drum
- Petra Haden – background vocals
- Keith Lowe – acoustic bass
- Jesse Zubot – mandolin, violin

Production notes:

- Produced by Lee Townsend.
- Engineered by Tucker Martine and Shawn Pierce.
- Edited and mixed by Shawn Pierce
- Assistant engineers - Sheldon Zaharko and Greg Kolchinsky
- Mastered by Greg Calbi
- Design by Chris Pew
