= Doug Cox (musician) =

Canadian multi-instrumentalist and composer

- Born: Alberta
- Genre: Blues
- Occupation: Musician
- Instruments: Dobro; slide guitar
- Labels: NorthernBlues; Black Hen
- Website: dougcox.org

Doug Cox (born in 1962 or 1963) is a multi-instrumentalist, composer and music programmer, and is currently signed to Toronto's NorthernBlues Music.

He is well known for his skills on the dobro and slide guitar. Cox is the first person from Canada to perform in the Dobrofest.

In 2004, Cox collaborated with Todd Butler and produced the CD, Dobro and Guitar, which received a nomination from the Western Canadian Music Awards for "best roots music". The CD was also named "CD of the year" at the Vancouver Island Music Festival.

Cox teamed with Indian veena player Salil Bhatt on two albums: Slide to Freedom in 2011 and Slide to Freedom 2 in 2012. At times they were accompanied by John Boutté (vocals), Ramkumar Mishra (tabla), Vishwa Mohan Bhatt (veena), and Dinah D (bass).

Cox currently resides on Vancouver Island, Canada.

== Discography ==
=== Solo albums ===
- 1993: Canadian Borderline (Malahat Mountain)
- 1996: Bone Bottle Brass Steel (Malahat Mountain)
- 1999: Life Is So Peculiar (Ragged Pup / Cordova Bay)
- 2009: Without Words (Black Hen)

=== With Todd Butler ===
- 2002: Live Blues (Pacific Music)
- 2004: Dobro and Guitar (Pacific Music)

=== With Sam Hurrie ===
- 2004: Hungry Ghosts (NorthernBlues)
- 2007: Blues from the Forbidden Plateau (Snoozeyouloseblues)
- 2017: Old Friends (Black Hen)

=== With Salil Bhatt and Ramkumar Mishra ===
- 2007: Slide To Freedom (NorthernBlues)
- 2008: Slide To Freedom 2 (NorthernBlues)

=== With Bettysoo ===
- 2011: Across The Borderline: Lie To Me (self-released)
- 2012: Across The Borderline: More Lies (self-released)

=== As producer ===
- 2009: Corinne West - The Promise (Make Records)
- 2011: Slide to Freedom - 20,000 Miles (NorthernBlues)
- 2015: James Burton, Albert Lee, Amos Garrett, and David Wilcox - Guitar Heroes (Stony Plain)

=== Also appears on ===
- 2000: Sheila Ryan - Samrad Linn (self-released)
- 2001: Michael Messer - King Guitar (Catfish)
- 2010: Leela Gilday - Calling All Warriors (Big Soul)
- 2011: The Mighty Popo - Gakondo (Borealis)
- 2012: Linda McRae - Rough Edges & Ragged Hearts (42 RPM)
- 2014: Linda McRae - Fifty Shades of Red (Borealis Records)

== Music Instruction ==
=== Books ===
- 1998: Blues Dobro book, CD (Centerstream) ISBN 1574240552
- 1999: Slide Guitar and Open Tunings (Centerstream) ISBN 1574240684
- 2000: Understanding Roots Guitar: An Overview of North American Folk Styles book, CD (Centerstream)
- 2005: Backup Dobro: Exploring the Fretboard (Centerstream) ISBN 1574241427

=== DVDs ===
- 2000: Understanding Roots Guitar: An Overview of North American Folk Styles (Centerstream)
- 2004: More Dobro: A Lesson in Lap-Style Dobro Playing (Centerstream)
- 2005: Understanding Slide Guitar with Doug Cox (Mel Bay)
