= Scream (1996 soundtrack) =

Soundtracks to the 1996 film Scream

The music to the 1996 slasher film Scream directed by Wes Craven featured two albums released in order to promote the film. An original soundtrack to the film featuring several songs as heard in the film, released by TVT Records on December 17, 1996. Marco Beltrami's score for the film was released along with Scream 2, in a double-disc album in July 1998. The soundtrack and score received acclaim from critics.

== Soundtrack ==
Scream: Music from the Dimension Motion Picture

Soundtrack album by Various artists
- Released: December 17, 1996
- Recorded: 1993–1996
- Genre: Alternative rock
- Length: 46:30
- Label: TVT
- Producers: Marco Beltrami; Tony Cohen; Kelley Deal; Ed Gerrard; Tim Harper; Timothy London; Tim Patalan; Jefferey Rabhan; Chris Randall

Scream: Music from the Dimension Motion Picture is the original soundtrack to the film released on December 17, 1996, by TVT Records. It featured 11 songs—most of which appeared in various scenes in the film—in addition to a cue from Beltrami film's score. The soundtrack was not as successful, failing to chart on the US Billboard 200.

=== Background ===
"School's Out" by Alice Cooper appeared in the film following the closure of Woodsboro high school, but in the album, the original song was replaced by its cover performed by The Last Hard Men. The acoustic cover of Blue Öyster Cult's "Don't Fear the Reaper", performed by Gus Black, is plays softly in the background while Sidney and Billy discuss their relationship. The original song was featured in the soundtrack to John Carpenter's Halloween, a film to which Scream makes repeated homage. Analyst Jeff Smith describes the musical choice as:

An ironic comment on the brutality we have just seen in the opening sequence. More importantly, however, the allusion to the Blue Öyster Cult classic recasts the song's title by literalizing its meaning. While the title itself invokes the Reaper as a popular symbol for death, the film presents us with an actual person, who not only dresses as the Grim Reaper but also unleashes homicidal vengeance on the other characters of the film. The irony here, of course, is that Billy himself proves to be one of the film's dual slashers and is, in fact, the "Reaper" to be feared.

The song "Red Right Hand" by Nick Cave and the Bad Seeds, heard in the first film, is also used in the forthcoming instalments (excluding Scream 4). Nick Cave performs a version of the track written specifically for Scream 3 in that film. An alternate version of the music video "Drop Dead Gorgeous" by Republica, featuring clips from the film, was shown on music networks such as MTV. Although the song can be heard in the film, it is only included on the European edition of the soundtrack album. The song was also used in one of the film's television commercials.

=== Track listing ===
Scream: Music from the Dimension Motion Picture
No.	Title	Writer(s)	Producer(s)	Length
1.	"Youth of America" (Birdbrain)	Ammo	Tim Patalan; Ammo	3:03
2.	"Whisper" (Catherine)	Keith Brown; Kerry Brown; Mark Rew	Catherine	3:12
3.	"Red Right Hand" (Nick Cave and the Bad Seeds)	Nick Cave; Mick Harvey; Thomas Wydler	Tony Cohen; The Bad Seeds	6:11
4.	"(Don't Fear) The Reaper" (Gus)	Donald Roeser	Christopher Thorn; Gus	4:47
5.	"Artificial World (Interdimensional Mix)" (Julee Cruise with The Flow)	Julee Cruise; Louis Tucci; Supa D.J. Dmittry; D.J. Silver	The Flow	5:08
6.	"Better Than Me" (Sister Machine Gun)	Chris Randall	Chris Randall	4:01
7.	"Whisper to a Scream (Birds Fly)" (Soho)	Ian McNabb	Timothy London	5:26
8.	"First Cool Hive" (Moby)	Richard Hall	Moby	5:16
9.	"Bitter Pill" (The Connells)	Peele Wimberley	Tim Harper; The Connells	3:41
10.	"School's Out" (The Last Hard Men)	Alice Cooper; Michael Bruce; Glen Buxton; Dennis Dunaway; Neal Smith	Kelley Deal	2:17
11.	"Trouble in Woodsboro" / "Sidney's Lament"	Marco Beltrami	Marco Beltrami	3:28
Total length:				46:30

Scream: Music from the Dimension Motion Picture – European edition
No.	Title	Writer(s)	Length
12.	"Drop Dead Gorgeous" (Republica)	Saffron; Tim Dorney; Andy Todd; Johnny Male	4:30
Total length:			51:00

=== Charts ===
Chart (1997–98)	Peak position
New Zealand Albums (RMNZ)	29

== Score ==
Marco Beltrami's score for Scream was released along with the score for Scream 2 on July 14, 1998, in a double CD edition. It consisted of only six tracks with a runtime of only 12 minutes, compared to over an hour of music made for the film. Some reviewers felt the restricted runtime was a result of the high cost of releasing a composer's music commercially, combined with Varèse Sarabande's unwillingness to pay. However, on June 6, 2011, the complete score—consisting of 25 tracks, with a runtime of 63 minutes—was released as a part of the score's "deluxe edition" pressed to 2,000 copies.

=== Release history ===
Scream and Scream 2's score were released in vinyl in September 2016 in bone white and splatter-colored editions, and was again re-issued on a red-colored vinyl disc in July 2019. Beltrami's score for the first four films of the franchise has been issued in a box set on January 7, 2022, coinciding the fifth instalment's release and in vinyl box set on June 10, 2022.

=== Track listing ===
Original release
No.	Title	Length
1.	"Sidney's Lament"	1:37
2.	"Altered Ego"	2:47
3.	"Trouble In Woodsboro"	1:49
4.	"A Cruel World"	1:53
5.	"Chasing Sidney"	1:27
6.	"NC-17"	3:03
Total length:		12:36

Complete score
No.	Title	Length
1.	"Dimension Logo"	0:18
2.	"The Cue From Hell"	10:33
3.	"Trouble In Woodsboro"	1:51
4.	"Sid's House"	1:12
5.	"Red Herring"	2:13
6.	"Killer Calls Sidney"	2:52
7.	"Chasing Sidney"	1:29
8.	"Cell Phone"	1:00
9.	"Backdoor Gail"	0:48
10.	"Schoolyard 2"	1:17
11.	"Sid's Doubt"	1:23
12.	"Bathroom"	2:57
13.	"Mr. Himbry Gets It"	2:11
14.	"Sheriff And Dewey"	1:21
15.	"Tatum's Torture"	2:46
16.	"Sidney Wants It"	3:07
17.	"Dewey And Gail"	1:57
18.	"Off To See Himbry"	0:41
19.	"Killer Stabs Billy"	2:49
20.	"Randy Almost Gets It"	2:33
21.	"Gail Crashes The Van"	1:33
22.	"They're Crazy"	9:42
23.	"Sid Stabs Billy"	4:24
24.	"Billy's Back"	0:52
25.	"End Credits"	1:39
Total length:		63:28

Alternate cues
No.	Title	Length
1.	"Sid's Window"	0:26
2.	"Gut Someone"	0:13
3.	"Sid Looks"	0:16
4.	"Billy Looks"	0:24
5.	"Billy to Cell"	0:34
6.	"Killer Calls Again"	0:35
7.	"Bang Into Billy"	0:12
8.	"Girl Talk"	0:54
9.	"Video Store"	0:45
10.	"Why She's Here"	0:16
11.	"Billy Sting"	0:13
12.	"Prescott's Car"	0:29
13.	"Hairbrush"	0:38
14.	"The Cue from Hell (Orchestra Only)"	6:18
Total length:		12:13

=== Reception ===
The score to Scream received generally positive reviews, with Mikael Carlsson labeling it as "some of the most intriguing horror scores composed in years". Christian Clemmensen of Filmtracks.com claimed the scores had "cult status", awarding it 3 stars out of 5. He also called the "haunting" vocals of "Sidney's Lament" as the "voice of the franchise", which had been used in the forthcoming sequels. AllMusic said that the score "perfectly captured the post-modern, hip scare-ride of the Scream movies", also giving it 3 stars out of 5. James Southall of Movie Wave commented that the score is "less likely to become one of Beltrami's finest scores" but "one of his most important, considering the impact it had on his career", writing "There are certainly some wonderful aspects to it, it's fascinating to hear the early development of ideas which would become trademarks of the composer, and indeed it's impressive to hear the scale of music he was able to write on such a small budget."

== See also ==
- Music of the Scream franchise
