= Ram Kumar =

Ram Kumar or Ramkumar may refer to:

- Ramkumar (born 1968), Indian actor
- Ram Kumar (artist) (1924–2018), Indian artist
- Ram Kumar (basketball) (born 1964), Indian basketball player
- Ram Kumar (politician) (born 1957), Indian politician
- Ramkumar Bohra, Indian filmmaker
- Ramkumar Chattopadhyay, Indian singer, composer and music director
- Ramkumar Ganesan (born 1955), Indian film producer and actor
- Ramkumar Mishra, Indian classical musician
- Ramkumar Mukhopadhyay (born 1956), Indian writer in Bengali
- Ramkumar Ramanathan, Indian tennis player
- Ramkumar Singh, Indian screenwriter
- Ramkumar Toppo, Indian politician
- Ramkumar Verma, Indian poet

== See also ==
- Ram (disambiguation)
- Kumar (disambiguation)
- Ram Kumar Dwivedi, a village in the Pali district of Rajasthan, India
- Ram Kumar Caroli, Ramkumar Bohra
- Ram Kumar Kashyap, Indian politician
- Ram Kumar Sharma, Indian politician
- Ram Kumar Verma, Indian politician
