= Let's Be Nice =

1997 album by Birdbrain

Studio album by Birdbrain
- Released: February 18, 1997
- Recorded: 1997 Long View Farms North Brookfield, Massachusetts
- Genre: Post-grunge
- Length: 42:48
- Label: TVT Records
- Producer: Tim Patalan

Birdbrain chronology
Bliss (1995)	Let's Be Nice (1997)

Professional ratings
Review scores
Source	Rating
Allmusic	3/5 stars

Let's Be Nice is the second album by Boston post-grunge band Birdbrain released on February 18, 1997, on TVT Records. The album features their song "Youth of America" that was featured in the films Scream, and Masterminds. It received positive reviews, but failed to launch the band into the mainstream. "(She's Always) Glowing" was later featured on the TVT compilation Got TVT?.

== Singles ==
The only single released from the album was "Youth of America", which had been released from the album the year before. A video was released for the song which contained parts of the film Scream.

== Track listing ==
All music is composed by Joey Ammo, except where noted.

Side one
No.	Title	Writer(s)	Length
1.	"Youth of America"		3:00
2.	"Talk About Me"		2:56
3.	"(She's Always) Glowing"		3:50
4.	"Inside Out"		2:13
5.	"Get It On"		4:01
6.	"Grey"		3:27
7.	"Queen Bitch"	David Bowie	2:56
8.	"My Gun"		2:33
9.	"Tell Me"		2:35
10.	"Jesus Wept"		3:16
11.	"High"		4:36
12.	"The Ballad of Johnny Love"		7:25
Total length:			42:48

== Personnel ==
- Joey Ammo – vocals, guitar, production
- Mikel Benway – drums, vocals
- Joe McCarthy – bass guitar
- Tim Patalan – production
- Jack Joseph Puig – mixing
- Bob Ludwig – mastering
