= Western Bell =

Studio album by Kelly Joe Phelps
- Released: March 17, 2009
- Recorded: June 2008 at Hop Walter, Vancouver, Washington
- Genre: Country blues, folk, Americana, new acoustic, instrumental
- Length: 45:13
- Label: Black Hen
- Producer: Kelly Joe Phelps

Kelly Joe Phelps chronology
Tunesmith Retrofit (2006)	Western Bell (2009)	Magnetic Skyline (2010)

Western Bell is an album by American blues singer and guitarist Kelly Joe Phelps, released 2009. Unlike his previous albums, Western Bell is entirely instrumental. After five discs on Rykodisc and one for Rounder, Phelps joined Black Hen Music, a small independent record label founded in Vancouver, British Columbia.

== Reception ==
Professional ratings
Review scores
Source	Rating
Allmusic	4/5 stars
BBC Music	(no rating)
No Depression	(Favorable)
PopMatters	8/10 stars

Music critic Thom Jurek praised the release in his Allmusic review, writing "Phelps has, on Western Bell, offered listeners a complete synthesis of his musical vision as a guitarist... Phelps infuses his own music with such comfort, space, and gentleness in his playing that what comes out is his own inviting but subjective history of blues as it has evolved in his spirit... Western Bell is among the most unique acoustic guitar recordings out there today... Cryptic, hushed, confoundingly beautiful, this is a brilliant, deeply moving work by an artist who has created a new language on the acoustic guitar, culled from the discontinued speech fragments of American music's own mysterious past." Chris Jones of the BBC wrote: "... while Phelps' lyrical work may sometimes be a little too intense for its own good, you find yourself missing his rasp. Such technically dazzling stuff can often be hard to really love, and it is a little over-egged. But when it's properly balanced with the glow of familiar chord progressions as on the appropriately-named 12-string track, Hometown With Melody, it's simply wonderful. One for fans."

Steve Pick of No Depression praised the Phelps' change in direction, writing "... often exquisite, and always intriguing, that his commercial divergence is our gain... Western Bell may be something more for those who miss the late, great John Fahey, or who wish Leo Kottke would drop his microphone and just play. There is definitely a sense of connection to those prior masters of acoustic guitar with folk and modernist ideas."

PopMatters critic Alan Ranta praised the album within the small niche of solo guitar: "In a world adequately full of praise for the likes of Leo Kottke and John Fahey, surely there is room for Washington’s Kelly Joe Phelps. His eighth album of solo acoustic guitar improvisation should be enough to land him status in the company of legends, if he isn’t there already... there is something undeniably moving about Western Bell... Phelps speaks directly to your soul. If that isn’t the stuff of legends, I don’t know what is."

== Track listing ==
All songs written by Kelly Joe Phelps.

1. "Western Bell" – 3:08
2. "Sovereign Wyoming" – 3:58
3. "Blowing Dust 40 Miles" – 4:46
4. "American Exchange Hotel" – 2:27
5. "Hometown with Melody" – 4:19
6. "Hattie's Hat" – 4:27
7. "The Jenny Spin" – 4:47
8. "Murdo" – 4:41
9. "East to Kansas" – 3:56
10. "Blue Daughter Tattoo" – 4:47
11. "Little Family" – 3:57

== Personnel ==
- Kelly Joe Phelps - 6 and 12-string guitars, lap steel guitar, bells

Production notes:

- Produced and engineered by Kelly Joe Phelps
- Cover photograph, graphics, and layout by Anthony Saint James
