= Brother Sinner and the Whale =

Studio album by Kelly Joe Phelps
- Released: August 21, 2012
- Genre: Country blues, folk, Americana, gospel
- Length: 51:06
- Label: Black Hen
- Producer: Kelly Joe Phelps

Kelly Joe Phelps chronology
| Magnetic Skyline (2010) | Brother Sinner and the Whale (2012) |

Brother Sinner and the Whale is an album by American blues singer and guitarist Kelly Joe Phelps, released in 2012. It was recorded in mono with only voice and guitar.

== Reception ==
Professional ratings
Review scores
| Source | Rating |
|---|---|
| Allmusic | 4/5 stars |

Music critic Thom Jurek praised the release in his Allmusic review, writing "...it's the originals, all rooted in country and blues gospel, that embrace with unflinching honesty a return to Phelps' evangelical roots, but he's older, wiser, repentant. His bottleneck slide playing and fingerpicking finesse are deft and fluid as ever. His writing is tight, full of solid melodies, beautiful couplets, biblical poetry, and lithe passages where lyrics and guitars blur and intertwine seamlessly... No matter your spiritual beliefs, it's difficult to fault Phelps for such a warm, inviting, and brave recording. If conviction and quality are the measure of a songwriter and musician, the songs and performances on Brother Sinner & the Whale are the very measure of both."

== Track listing ==
All songs written by Kelly Joe Phelps unless otherwise noted.

1. "Talkin' to Jehovah" – 4:36
2. "Goodbye to Sorrow" – 3:28
3. "Hope in the Lord to Provide" – 5:45
4. "Pilgrim's Reach" – 4:29
5. "Spit Me Outta the Whale" – 4:05
6. "Sometimes a Drifter" – 4:52
7. "Hard Time They Never Go Away" – 4:43
8. "I've Been Converted" (Traditional) – 3:09
9. "The Holy Spirit Flood" – 4:58
10. "Down to the Praying Ground" – 4:35
11. "Guide Me, O Thou Great Jehovah" – 3:27
12. "Brother Pilgrim" – 2:59

== Personnel ==
- Kelly Joe Phelps – vocals, guitar

Production notes:

- Steve Dawson – producer, engineer, mixing, mastering
- John Rummen – artwork
