= Black Hen Music =

Canadian independent record label

- Founded: 1995
- Founder: Steve Dawson
- Distributors: Fontana North (Can); Continental Record Services (Eur); Burnside (US)
- Genre: Acoustic
- Country of origin: Canada
- Location: Vancouver, British Columbia and Nashville, TN
- Official website: www.blackhenmusic.com

Black Hen Music is a Canadian independent record label founded in Vancouver, British Columbia in 1995. The music label was established by record producer and musician Steve Dawson of the band Zubot and Dawson. Black Hen Music began releasing albums in 1996 and is distributed in Canada by Fontana North, in Europe and the UK by Continental Record Services, and in the US by Burnside Distribution.

== Awards ==
Black Hen artists have received the following awards and nominations:

- 5 Juno Awards
- 11 Juno Nominations
- 1 Maple Blues Award
- 3 Canadian Folk Music Awards
- 1 SOCAN #1 Award
- 1 Grand Prix de Jazz de Montreal
- 8 Western Canadian Music Awards
- 24 Western Canadian Music Award nominations
- 2 Canadian Independent Music Awards

== Roster ==
- Coco Love Alcorn
- Geoff Berner
- Bottleneck
- Jim Byrnes
- Steve Dawson
- The Deep Dark Woods
- Andrew Downing
- Great Uncles of the Revolution
- John Wort Hannam
- Paul Humphrey
- Shuyler Jansen
- Old Man Luedecke
- Cara Luft
- Big Dave McLean
- Linda McRae
- Kelly Joe Phelps
- Tim Posgate
- Don Rooke
- The Sojourners
- Chris Tarry
- David Wall
- Jenny Whiteley
- Joey Wright
- Zubot and Dawson

== See also ==
- List of record labels
