= Tunesmith Retrofit =

Studio album by Kelly Joe Phelps
- Released: August 1, 2006
- Recorded: at The Factory Studios, Vancouver by Steve Dawson & Sheldon Zaharko
- Genre: Acoustic blues, Americana, contemporary folk, folk revival
- Length: 44:56
- Label: Rounder
- Producer: Steve Dawson, Kelly Joe Phelps

Kelly Joe Phelps chronology
Tap the Red Cane Whirlwind (2003)	Tunesmith Retrofit (2006)	Western Bell (2009)

Tunesmith Retrofit is an album by American blues/folk singer and guitarist Kelly Joe Phelps, released in 2006. It was his first recording on the Rounder label after five releases with Rykodisc. It reached #5 on the Billboard Top Blues Albums charts.

== Reception ==
Professional ratings
Review scores
Source	Rating
AllMusic	4/5 stars

Music critic Thom Jurek praised the release in his AllMusic review, calling it "... another side of Phelps to be sure, as a songwriter who understands the actual music of poetry and creates a loose, coarse weave that allows the listener room to inhabit and live inside his songs. His rhythm is true, his words are impure, his songs are nearly glorious. Once more, Phelps shatters expectations and conjures something truly original and brave in the process."

Russell Hall of No Depression wrote "Few songwriters wear the mantle of troubadour as unassumingly as Kelly Joe Phelps. Eschewing the cloying introspection that tends to prevail among the coffeehouse crowd, Phelps writes snapshot vignettes borne from short-story traditions and delivers them in sturdy acoustic settings drawn from folk, free jazz, and country blues. Tunesmith Retrofit is leaner and more spartan than 2003’s Slingshot Professionals, putting the light squarely on his songwriting."

== Track listing ==
All songs written by Kelly Joe Phelps.

1. "Crow's Nest" – 4:51
2. "The Anvil" – 3:35
3. "Spanish Hands" – 4:10
4. "Plumb Line" – 3:01
5. "Scapegoat" – 1:39
6. "Big Shakey" – 4:49
7. "Tight to the Jar" – 5:43
8. "MacDougal" – 3:20
9. "Loud as Ears" – 4:01
10. "Red Light Nickel" – 3:59
11. "Handful of Arrows" – 3:31
12. "Tunesmith Retrofit" – 2:10

== Personnel ==
- Kelly Joe Phelps - vocals, guitar, banjo, melodica
- Steve Dawson - tremolo Weissenborn, pedal steel guitar
- Chris Gestrin - pump organ, Wurlitzer, piano, melodica (6)
- Keith Lowe - acoustic bass
- John Raham - drums
- Jesse Zubot - fiddle

Production notes:

- Produced by Kelly Joe Phelps and Steve Dawson
- Engineered & Mixed by Steve Dawson and Sheldon Zaharko
- Mastered by Steve Fallone
- Liner Note text and Photography by Anthony Saint James
