= Long View Farm Studios =

Former music recording studio in North Brookfield, Massachusetts, US

Coordinates: 42.294476°N 72.088331°W

Long View Farm Studios was a music recording studio located in North Brookfield, Massachusetts, that was founded in 1974 by Gilbert Scott Markle, a professor at Clark University, on his farm property.

It was the location of recordings by many well-known musicians and bands, and it was used by the Rolling Stones as a rehearsal studio in 1981.

Markle died on March 20, 2015, at the age of 74.

== Recordings ==
=== Albums/EPs ===
- American Garage – Pat Metheny Group
- As Daylight Dies – Killswitch Engage
- Beggar's Oil – Kelly Joe Phelps
- Break the Cycle – Staind
- Cerulean – The Ocean Blue
- Children of Chaos – Soulidium
- The Devil and God Are Raging Inside Me – Brand New
- Feed My Soul – The Holmes Brothers
- Freeze Frame – J. Geils Band
- Get Some – Snot
- Home – Sevendust
- I Against I – Bad Brains
- It's Blitz! – Yeah Yeah Yeahs
- LCD Soundsystem – LCD Soundsystem
- Let's Be Nice – Birdbrain
- Love Stinks – J. Geils Band
- Lunch for the Sky – Socratic
- Mind on the Moon – Snow
- Misery Is a Butterfly – Blonde Redhead
- Pain Makes You Beautiful – The Judybats
- Pandora's Box – Aerosmith
- Plans – Death Cab for Cutie
- Right Back – Long Beach Dub All Stars
- Sky Like a Broken Clock – Kelly Joe Phelps
- Slip – Quicksand
- Sound of Silver – LCD Soundsystem
- Stain – Living Colour
- Sunburn – Fuel
- Super Taranta! – Gogol Bordello
- Until the End – Kittie
- Visual Lies – Lizzy Borden
- Voices – Matchbook Romance
