= Steve Dawson (Canadian musician) =

Canadian guitarist

- Instruments: Guitar, Weissenborn lap steel guitar
- Formerly of: Zubot and Dawson

Steve Dawson is a Canadian guitarist, singer, and music producer. Dawson has produced albums by Jim Byrnes, Kelly Joe Phelps, Old Man Luedecke, The Sojourners, and The Deep Dark Woods. He has won two Juno Awards. He frequently collaborates with keyboardist Chris Gestrin, bassist Keith Lowe and drummer Geoff Hicks. He has been a member of the duo Zubot & Dawson, and of the group The Great Uncles of the Revolution.

== Career ==
In 2001, Dawson came together with Jesse Zubot, Kevin Turcotte, and Andrew Downing to release an album, Great Uncles of the Revolution Stand Up!, which won a Western Music Award. In 2002, The Great Uncles of the Revolution performed at the Montreal Jazz Festival, and were presented with the Grand Prix de Jazz de Montreal.

Dawson also won the Independent Canadian Music Award for Roots Album Of The Year twice, in 2000 and 2002.

Dawson continued to perform with the Great Uncles and with the duo Zubot & Dawson, who won a 2003 Juno Award for Roots/Traditional Group Album with their recording Chicken Scratch.

A second Great Uncles of the Revolution album, Blow the House Down, won a 2004 Juno Award for Contemporary Jazz Album of the Year. In 2007, 2008, and 2009 Dawson was named Producer of the Year at the Western Canadian Music Awards.

In 2005, 2006, and 2010 he won the Canadian Folk Music Award. Dawson's album Nightshade appeared in Acoustic Guitar magazine's “Top 10 Guitar Albums of the Year - 2011”.

In 2012, Dawson released his album, Nightshade, through the label Black Hen Music.
