= Tender Is the Night (disambiguation) =

Tender Is the Night is a 1934 novel by F. Scott Fitzgerald.

Tender Is the Night may also refer to:

== Film and television ==
- Tender Is the Night (film), a 1962 film adaptation of the novel
- Tender Is the Night, a 1985 TV mini-series adaptation of the novel

== Music ==
- "Tender Is the Night", a 1961 song by Tony Bennett on the 1962 album I Left My Heart in San Francisco
  - Also used in the 1962 film Tender Is the Night
- Tender Is the Night (Johnny Mathis album), 1964
- Tender Is the Night (Old Man Luedecke album), 2012
- "Tender Is the Night", a 1983 song by Jackson Browne
- "Tender", a 1999 song by Blur, the first line of which is "Tender is the night..."
