= John Wort Hannam =

- John Wort Hannam performing in 2025

Background information
- Born: Saint Helier, Jersey
- Origin: Fort Macleod, Alberta, Canada
- Years active: 1998 - Present

John Wort Hannam is a Canadian folk musician, from Fort Macleod, Alberta. He is known for his story telling through music. Themes which are central to his music include life in Western Canada, and the human experience as seen through the eyes of working folk.

== Early life ==
Hannam was born in Jersey, Channel Islands.

== Career ==
Hannam was a full-time public school teacher until 2000. He has performed at festivals in Canada, the United States, Great Britain and Australia and he appeared at the 2006 Smithsonian Folklife Festival in Washington, D.C. In addition to singing, John plays guitar, tenor guitar and harmonica.

In 2010 Hannam was presented with a Canadian Folk Music Award.

He has also performed with T. Buckley in a duo called The Woodshed.

== Awards ==
- 2007 New Folk Winner Kerrville Folk Festival
- 2007 Songwriting Competition Calgary Folk Music Festival
- 2006 Best Performance Calgary Folk Music Festival
- 2005 CBC Galaxie Rising Star Award Edmonton Folk Music Festival
- 2005 NCRA 2005 Dig Your Roots Songwriting Competition.
- 2004 Songwriting Competition Calgary Folk Music Festival

== Discography ==
- Queen's Hotel Sept. 15, 2009. Released on independent label Black Hen Music
- Two Bit Suit April 10, 2007. Released on independent label Black Hen Music
- Dynamite and ‘dozers. June 16, 2004
- Pocket full of holes. July 17, 2002
