= Birdbrain (band) =

American band

- Origin: Boston, Massachusetts, U.S.
- Genres: Alternative rock Post-grunge
- Years active: 1992–1997
- Label: TVT Records
- Past members: Joey Ammo; Mike Benway; Joe McCarthy Jr. James Dennis; Francisco Barrientos; Lance Cole

Birdbrain was an American post-grunge band, formed in Boston, Massachusetts, by neighborhood friends in 1992 and dissolved in 1997. They had some success with their song "Youth of America", which appeared in the 1996 film Scream, as well as a contribution to the soundtrack for the 1995 film The Last Supper with a cover of Paul McCartney's "Jet". They were formed by guitarist/singer/songwriter Joey "Ammo" (Amicangelo) and drummer Mike Benway and signed to TVT Records in 1995. In their time, they produced two CD albums, and two film soundtrack song contributions. They broke up in 1997.

== History ==
The Boston band was formed in the early 1990s after a chance meeting in a Roslindale, MA, bar, between Ammo and Benway. They rented a rehearsal studio, began funding some recording projects and started setting up bookings. Eventually they hired local manager Jeff Hudson.

Hudson successfully shopped the recordings to contacts at TVT Records in 1995 with their tape "Princess", their contribution to Boston Rock n' Roll Anthology Vol. 18, as well as the release of their self-produced, full-length album, Bliss, and soon they had a recording contract.

Founding bassist Frank Barrientos left the band, replaced by guitarist/bassist/backing vocalist James Dennis. Joseph McCarthy Jr. was soon added on bass, and vocals. Dennis moved from bass to guitar, his forte. The new quartet went on tour in support of a TVT re-vamping of Bliss. Hudson was fired as manager and was replaced by the TVT nominee, Camille Barbone.

Bliss was not as successful as they had hoped. Dennis left amid rising tension in the wake of his expanding creative influence over Birdbrain's sound, with the band again as they were originally -- a rock trio: Benway on drums and backup vocals, Ammo, vocals, rhythm and lead guitar, and McCarthy on bass.

Benway had negotiated initial contract support from TVT to start a second album late in 1996. They had a slew of songs ready to choose from and the label poured over $200,000 into the production, well beyond the $30,000 required by the contract.

The trio spent weeks in pre-production and recording at the spa-like Long View Farm Studios (MA). They rented a good deal of equipment, hired producer Tim Patalan and got mixing and post-production work from Jack Joseph Puig at Electric Lady Studios (NY), as well as mastering with Howie Weinberg. This plush treatment was largely due to the intense advocacy of A&R Tom Sarig (Sarig moved on to a successful national A&R post the next year.)

By February 1997, Let's Be Nice was finished. On top of a disappointing performance from manager Barbone and no record distribution in place, Ammo having problems with illness -- Benway refused to tour, all resulting in substantial conflict. Barbone began working secretly to secure trademarks for Ammo and to develop a paper trail to create the appearance that Benway had resigned. This business maneuvering ran to artistic matters when Barbone recruited her former client for the tour, metal drummer Lance Cole, who can be seen "stick-synching" to Benway's tracks in the video for "Youth of America". The band toured a year later. Cole never recorded with the band, and never truly gelled with Ammo and McCarthy.

The ensuing tour was cut short by low morale over Benway's banishment and Ammo's continuing problems with medical issues, as well as alcohol and drug addiction throughout. Barbone resigned, and TVT dropped the band. Finally things had hit rock bottom and they disbanded in 1997.

The band had some success with Let's Be Nice, especially with the single "Youth of America", which was featured in the 1996 horror film Scream; TVT promoted the song as the single and lead track on the soundtrack album. The label had negotiated to have the band's logo included on all print advertising for the film, but Barbone countermanded this, feeling it was risky. One year later, the song was featured in the film Masterminds.

Let's Be Nice was nominated for Best Indie Album in the 1997 Boston Music Awards. Barbone attended the ceremony representing another band that had also been nominated. Ammo had been naturally invited. Benway had harangued the organizers to get his ticket. Thus all three of them, Benway, Ammo, and Barbone, sat in the audience while Paula Cole, who swept the awards that year, attributed her success to her drummer's influence.

Years later, TVT Records went on to be sold in its entirety to digital media outlet The Orchard.

Benway lives a successful personal life.

== Members ==
- Joey Ammo (Amicangelo) – vocals, guitar
- Joseph McCarthy Jr. – bass guitar
- Mike Benway – drums

== Discography and videography ==
Albums

- Bliss - 1995 (TVT Records)
- Let's Be Nice - 1997 (TVT Records)

Singles

- "Confession" - 1995 (TVT Records)
- "Roslindale" - 1996 (TVT Records)
- "Glue/Jet" - 1996 (TVT Records)
- "Youth of America" - 1997 (TVT Records)

Demo tapes

- Princess - 1993

Compilation appearances

- Got TVT? 1997 (TVT Records)
- Boston Rock n' Roll Anthology Vol. 18

Soundtrack appearances

- The Last Supper - 1995
- Scream - 1996
- Masterminds - 1997

Music videos

- "Confession" - 1995
- "Youth of America" - 1997
