= Soulidium =

American hard rock band

- Origin: Tampa, Florida, United States
- Genres: Alternative metal; hard rock
- Years active: 2006–2017, 2022–Present
- Labels: Dark Empire Entertainment, KnightVision, Adrenaline, Soulidium
- Members: Michael McKnight; Jerry “Shadow” Morte; Ilyn Nathaniel; Danny Cayocca
- Past members: AJ Maldonado; Eric Beausoleil; Jake Jaden; Chris Polidoro (touring); Jadis Lucien (touring); Spyder Zero Prime
- Website: soulidium.com

Soulidium is an American hard rock band formed in Tampa, Florida, United States, in 2006, currently consisting of frontman Michael McKnight, guitarist Jerry Morte, bassist Ilyn Nathaniel, and drummer Danny Cayocca. Under their original line-up, the band released their debut album, Children of Chaos in mid-2007. The band has toured many well-known bands, including Sevendust, Alice in Chains, Limp Bizkit, Alter Bridge, Puddle of Mudd, Hellyeah, Black Light Burns and Nonpoint. Numerous years after entering into a period of inactivity while attempting to release their sophomore album, initially titled "Fly 2 the Sun, around mid-2011, it was finally released, now re-titled "Awaken" in late 2015. The band had disbanded in 2017, but has reunited in 2022 and is currently working on a new album titled "Revolution" with several guest artists and collaborations that will be joining for several new singles and videos to be released before the album debuts in 2025

== History ==
=== Formation, Children Of Chaos (2006–2009) ===
Soulidium was formed in late 2006, by vocalist Michael McKnight. Guitarist AJ Maldonado would be the next member to join the band after seeing an ad posted by McKnight on Myspace. Soon to follow was guitarist Eric Beausoleil who AJ recommended to McKnight. After months of searching, drummer Danny Cayocca was found in Springfield, Missouri. Bassist and final member to join was Jake Jaden.

The same year, the band began recording their debut album, Children of Chaos, which was released on June 19, 2007. The song from their album, Trapped appears in the soundtrack for the film Saw IV, released on October 23, 2007. It was recorded entirely at Long View Recording Studio in Massachusetts. The album featured string work by American Grammy Award-winning keyboardist, composer, arranger and record producer Jeff Bova, whose credits include Celine Dion, Michael Jackson, Blondie, and Eric Clapton and mastering by the Grammy Award-winning Bob Ludwig, whose credits include Jimi Hendrix, Paul McCartney, Madonna, Rolling Stones, and Nirvana The album was well received by fans and critics alike and was considered an overall success. Later in 2007, a devastating fire and clash over the band’s direction split up the original lineup and led McKnight to immediately begin replacing members and forming a new lineup. In 2008, to prepare for touring, McKnight recruited guitarists Shadow Morte and Chris Polidoro and bassist Jadis Lucien. After switching through a few drummers, Danny Cayocca returned to the band on May 20, 2008. In 2008, American guitar manufacturer Dean Guitars sponsored and added Soulidium to their artist roster.

=== Awaken (2009–2017) ===
After finishing a second tour with Sevendust, along with Nonpoint and Alter Bridge that began July 29, Soulidium has begun work on writing their second album. Recording began in early 2009 with the band as a 3-piece. In December 2009, Soulidium released a demo preview of one of the songs from their upcoming album titled "S.O.A." to their MySpace page. In February 2010, the band released another demo preview of one of the songs from their upcoming album titled "Sacrificing You" to their MySpace page. In March 2010, Soulidium recruited guitarist Spyder Zero Prime and bassist Ilyn Nathaniel to complete the band's lineup as it will appear on the second album. On April 24, 2010 during the 98RockFest the group debuted live a new track titled "Reluctant Goodbye".

Sevendust singer Lajon Witherspoon has joined Soulidium on their upcoming radio single "Fly 2 The Sun" which was recorded by Producer Shawn Grove, (Dashboard Confessional, Matchbox 20, Sevendust), at Jan Smith Studios in Atlanta, GA. Michael McKnight has titled the new upcoming album "Fly 2 The Sun". Soulidium originally announced on their official website that a limited edition EP would first be released in late 2011, however a release date for the full LP will be announced pending the outcome of current negotiations with label interests.

In October 2010, the band uploaded a video to their official YouTube channel featuring a documentary-styled presentation of the making of their upcoming album, along with a live version of "Sacrificing You", which is also off the upcoming album.

In December 2010, Soulidium was named by Red Bull as being one of the top 5 upcoming bands to watch in 2011. The article compared Soulidium's live shows to those of "Rob Zombie, Marilyn Manson and Nine Inch Nails". The article goes on to define the bands fascination with vampires by stating "The Tampa-based quintet has a fascination with vampires, but not in a Twilight kind of way. Instead, the hard rock collective draws their inspiration from the sophistication of the creatures and incorporates that element into their records and live performance."

The album finished recording in June 2011 and was slated for release in August 2012. That release date was, however, canceled with the band under discussions for the album to have a major label release.

In October 2015, after years of inactivity, the band regrouped and announced the arrival of their second album, now re-titled "Awaken", which was released on October 30.

=== Revolution (since 2022) ===
In 2022 Michael McKnight officially rejoined with Soulidium bandmates Danny Cayocca, Jerry “Shadow” Morte, and Ilyn Nathaniel. A new album titled "Revolution" is to be released in 2023 through Dark Empire Entertainment.

A new single titled Phantom in the Wire is to be released on July 29, 2023.

== Musical style and influences ==
Michael McKnight referenced musical figures including Trent Reznor, Soundgarden, and Marilyn Manson as influencing the band and their music. Commenting on influences, McKnight wrote, "I believe that music, film, & video are siblings. Visual and audio work together to entertain, inspire, and move the spirit. Our vision for Soulidium was that we would follow no rules. We wanted to penetrate all realms where emotion is born, and that is why we choose to do this on our own before going to the right label for support. We wanted to prove that we had what people wanted before our dreams got stamped out by a suit who was tainted by the "safe & generic way" to bring it. It's hard to argue with happy fans who love what we do."

== Band personnel ==
=== Current ===
- Michael McKnight - lead vocals (2006–2017; 2022–present)
- Jerry “Shadow” Morte - guitar (2008–2015; 2022–present)
- Ilyn Nathaniel - bass (2010-2015; 2022–present)
- Danny Cayocca - drums (2006–2007; 2008–2015; 2022–present)

=== Former members ===
- AJ Maldonado - guitar (2006–2007)
- Eric Beausoleil - guitar (2006–2007)
- Jake Jaden - bass (2006–2007)
- Chris Polidoro - guitar (touring member) (2008–2009)
- Jadis Lucien - bass (touring member) (2008–2009)
- Spyder Zero Prime - guitar (2010–2012)

== Discography ==
=== Albums ===
- Children of Chaos (2007)
- Awaken (2015)
- Revolution (2023)

=== DVDs ===
- Dark of Night (2009)

=== Singles ===
- "Trapped"
- "The Light"
- "Live Forever"
- "Fly 2 the Sun"
- "Phantom in the Wire"

=== Soundtracks ===
Year	Title	Album
2007	"Trapped"	Saw IV Soundtrack
