= Kevin Turcotte =

Canadian trumpet player

Kevin Turcotte is a trumpet player based in Toronto, Ontario, Canada. Turcotte is also on faculty at York University.

== Early life and education ==
Turcotte grew up in Sudbury, Ontario, He is a graduate of the University of Toronto, attended Humber College for one year and has participated in multiple summer jazz workshops at the Banff School of Fine Arts.

== Career ==
Turcotte has performed and recorded with Mike Murley, Rob McConnell and The Boss Brass, Dave Young, Rich Brown, Michael Occhipinti, Andrew Downing, Barry Elmes, Jean Martin Trio, and Barry Romberg (his playing was praised for its intuitiveness on All About Jazz).

Turcotte was a member of the first jazz band to perform live on the Junos. (Juno Awards of 1993) They were introduced by Celine Dion and the band included PJ Perry (1993 Juno winner), Ed Bickert, Rick Wilkins, Don Thompson, Oliver Jones and Rob McConnell. He was also a member of Memo Acevedo's Jazz Cartel when they hosted the first Latin Jazz Summit at Massey Hall in Toronto allowing him the opportunity to play with Johnny Pacheco, Tito Puente and Gonzalo Rubalcaba.

In 2001 Turcotte joined the group Great Uncles of the Revolution. Their album Stand Up won a West Coast Music Award. Their second album, bLOW tHE hOUSE dOWN, for which Turcotte composed two of the tracks, won a 2004 Juno Award as Contemporary Jazz Album of the Year.

In 2002, Turcotte was named trumpeter of the year in Canada's inaugural National Jazz Awards. (an award he would go on to win at least 10 more times) while that summer, the Uncles would be awarded the Grand Prix du Jazz at the Montreal International Jazz Festival.

In 2004 he and drummer Jean Martin created and improvised a live 60 minute set of duo music for the TVO film series "Duos:The Jazz Sessions" by filmmaker Daniel K. Berman at the Du Maurier Theatre Centre in Toronto. Martin and Turcotte are also featured in a Trio with Justin Haynes called "Get Together Weather"https://www.allaboutjazz.com/get-together-weather-jean-martin-page-music-review-by-glenn-astarita

In 2014, Turcotte provided the trumpet tracks for Chet Baker's (Ethan Hawke) performances in the biographic film Born to Be Blue about the late American jazz musician. David Braid's soundtrack with Turcotte would go on to win Canadian Screen Awards for best soundtrack and original song.

In 2016 Turcotte played on the soundtrack to the critically acclaimed video game Cuphead which received praise for its art style, gameplay, soundtrack, and being one of the hardest video games ever created.

In 2020, Turcotte was member of the John Clayton led Keorner Hall Orchestra that performed the World Premiere of Oscar Peterson's "Africa Suite". He was featured with the rhythm section consisting of Christian McBride, Benny Green and Lewis Nash.
