= Beggar's Oil =

EP by Kelly Joe Phelps
- Released: January 2002
- Genre: Blues, country blues, folk
- Label: Rykodisc
- Producer: George Howard

Kelly Joe Phelps chronology
Sky Like a Broken Clock (2001)	Beggar's Oil (2002)	Slingshot Professionals (2003)

Beggar's Oil is an EP by American blues singer and guitarist Kelly Joe Phelps, released in 2002.

== History ==
Beggar's Oil was recorded at Long View Farms from Feb 6 - Feb 13, 2001, during the same sessions that produced Sky Like a Broken Clock. Phelps' first releases were essentially his voice and the voice of his slide guitar. He assembled a band and put aside the slide guitar to focus on his fingerpicking style.

"Lass of Loch Royale (If I Prove False to Thee)" was recorded live at the Kuumbwa Jazz Center in Santa Cruz, CA on November 20, 1999. The title track is the same as found on Sky Like a Broken Clock.

== Reception ==
Professional ratings
Review scores
Source	Rating
AllMusic	3/5 stars

Music critic Chris Jones of the BBC Folk/Country Reviews wrote, "Simply, this record brings us true tales from the barren outposts of the human heart. A genuine original."

== Track listing ==
All songs written by Kelly Joe Phelps except "Lass of Loch Royale (If I Prove False to Thee)" (Traditional).

1. "Beggar's Oil"
2. "Tommy"
3. "Don Quixote's Windmill"
4. "Frankenstein Party of Three: Your Table is Ready"
5. "Beggar's Oil" (band arrangement)
6. "Lass of Loch Royale (If I Prove False to Thee)"

== Personnel ==
- Kelly Joe Phelps - vocals, guitar, resonator guitar, slide guitar
- Larry Taylor - bass
- Billy Conway - drums, percussion
- Tom West - Hammond organ
- Dinty Child - pump organ, accordion
- David Henry - cello
- Jim Fitting - harmonica

== Production ==
- Produced by George Howard
- Engineered by David Henry
- Mixed by George Howard and David Henry
- Mastered by Jeff Lipton
- Track 6 recorded by Dave Nielsen and mixed by Julie Rix
