= Roll Away the Stone (album) =

Studio album by Kelly Joe Phelps
- Released: August 26, 1997
- Recorded: 1996
- Genres: Gospel blues, country blues
- Length: 58:16
- Label: Rykodisc
- Producer: "...a mystery..."

Kelly Joe Phelps chronology
| Lead Me On (1994) | Roll Away the Stone (1997) | Shine Eyed Mister Zen (1999) |

Roll Away the Stone is an album by American blues singer and guitarist Kelly Joe Phelps, released in 1997. It was his first release on the Rykodisc label and reached No. 10 on the Billboard Top Blues Albums charts.

Phelps' notes state "All songs recorded in my used to be a hotel now it's an apartment building apartment, between airplane take-offs and police sirens, deep in the winter of 1996, except "Cypress Grove" and "Go There" which were recorded in an empty house in Northeast Portland. Same Winter. Dave Schiffman engineered "Cypress Grove". Dale Lawrence supplied the house. Mixed at The Digs by Craig Carothers. Mastered by Toby Mountain at Northeastern Digital, Southboro, MA. Production remains a mystery..."

== Reception ==
Professional ratings
Review scores
| Source | Rating |
|---|---|
| AllMusic | 4/5 stars |
| The Penguin Guide to Blues Recordings | 3/4 stars |

Writing for AllMusic, music critic D. Elaine McDonald stated: "Phelps continues to grow as both a musician and songwriter, and his interpretations of classic blues songs show increased imagination. Although it's based in classic blues, this music doesn't sound ancient — it sounds vital and alive, like any great music should." Thom Owen of No Depression wrote, "Phelps began his musical career playing jazz, and those roots are evident in his introspective, sandpapery vocals on Roll Away The Stone... The three traditional songs here would be at home on Phelps’ first record. He sticks to a simple and respectful reading of these numbers, relying on their timelessness and his silken voice for effect."

== Track listing ==
All songs written by Kelly Joe Phelps except as noted.

1. "Roll Away the Stone" – 4:50
2. "Sail the Jordan" – 6:01
3. "When the Roll Is Called Up Yonder" (James Milton Black) – 5:52
4. "Hosanna" – 8:46
5. "Without the Light" – 4:44
6. "Footprints" (Traditional) – 4:35
7. "Go There" – 4:17
8. "See That My Grave Is Kept Clean" (Blind Lemon Jefferson, Lewis) – 6:50
9. "Cypress Grove" (Skip James) – 6:42
10. "That's Alright" (Traditional) – 3:25
11. "Doxology" (Traditional) – 2:14

== Personnel ==
- Kelly Joe Phelps – vocals, 6- and 12-string lap slide guitars, 6-string conventional guitar
