= Tap the Red Cane Whirlwind =

Live album by Kelly Joe Phelps
- Released: February 1, 2005
- Recorded: 2004
- Genre: Blues, country blues
- Label: Rykodisc
- Producer: Lee Townsend

Kelly Joe Phelps chronology
Slingshot Professionals (2003)	Tap the Red Cane Whirlwind (2005)	Tunesmith Retrofit (2006)

Tap the Red Cane Whirlwind is an album by American blues singer and guitarist Kelly Joe Phelps. It reached number 11 on the Billboard Top Blues Albums.

== History ==
Tap the Red Cane Whirlwind is a collection of solo live performances from engagements at McCabe's, Santa Monica, California and Freight and Salvage, Berkeley, California in 2004.

In an interview regarding his first live release, Phelps said, "My passion lies in performing live, in the sense of 'no net' string grabbing and 'lord knows what' singing and flying by my seat and watching the songs come alive (hopefully) in a way that I could have never predicted beforehand. I've wanted to have a recorded representation of that for some time..."

== Reception ==
Professional ratings
Review scores
Source	Rating
AllMusic	4.5/5 stars
Minor 7th	(no rating)
No Depression	(Favorable)
PopMatters	5/10 stars

Music critic Thom Jurek praised the release in his AllMusic review, writing "Phelps is a dynamite guitarist who adds, subtracts, and morphs figures onto the original fingerstyle lines, and uses his voice to offer evidence of the timelessness of the lyric. And as moving and virtuosic as these two performances are, it's his own songs that offer the true prize of this collection... if there is one recording that captures the sum of the magic, power, and poetry that is Kelly Joe Phelps, this one's it." Fred Kraus of Minor 7th wrote: "His slices-of-life verses provide character insight without being self-confessional, and just enough detail to be recognizable without being self-focused. His observations are such that they open up our world rather than reduce it. Phelps definitely has it going on."

David Greenberger of No Depression praised the album with reservations, writing "After exploring the studio possibilities with a shifting but sympathetic group of players, Phelps turns, on this record, to a form that has been his mainstay: live, solo performance... His music is so tied to a sound that the songs can roll into one another, as well as disappear into themselves. Granted, some of those issues can be chalked up to creative subtleties, but there are times when you just want him to change registers and head into the truly unknown. That said, Phelps is a riveting performer, integrating his singing into his playing with results that exude fully committed emotional character... Phelps’ singing goes down so smooth I just want him to even let out a cough to rough up the flow at some point."

PopMatters critic Robert R. Calder is equally equivocal, giving the album 5 of 10 stars: "He seems hardly to have combined verbal inspiration into any very conventional sort of song.... In some respects Phelps lets himself off easy. The lack of straight sequential meanings simply spreads words and phrases across the virtuoso guitar music... The result is probably good in parts, but I wonder how the real oddness of some lyrics might disquiet listeners after a little longer than a critic can allow himself/herself to relisten to a review copy before writing. There's a cause of disquiet at odds with the gentle and often beautiful music. I'll declare no conclusion but advise potential listeners that they might find something incoherent and unlikeable. It's worth suggesting that while there's impressive evidence here that Kelly Joe Phelps is an exceptionally talented musician, guitarist, and performer, he has perhaps not distinguished himself in words."

== Track listing ==
All songs by Kelly Joe Phelps unless otherwise noted.

1. "Hard Time Killing Floor Blues" (Skip James) – 9:46
2. "Not So Far to Go" – 7:35
3. "Jericho" – 8:46
4. "Fleashine" – 6.44
5. "Cardboard Box of Batteries" – 6:29
6. "Gold Tooth" – 8:56
7. "Tommy" – 6:47
8. "I Am the Light of the World" (Reverend Gary Davis) – 6:28
9. "Waiting for Marty" – 6:26

== Personnel ==
- Kelly Joe Phelps - vocals, guitar

Production:

- Engineered and mixed by Shawn Pierce
- Mastered by Greg Calbi
- Photography by Michael "Mick" Wilson
- Design by Gwen Terpstra
