= Corinne West =

American singer-songwriter (born 1970)

- Born: Corinne Marie Brondino; 1970 (age 55–56); Los Angeles, United States
- Genres: Folk, Americana
- Occupations: Singer-songwriter, guitarist
- Instrument: Acoustic guitar
- Label: Make (Note: Make Records is West's private label based in California – Alameda (2009) and Larkspur (2015). It is not affiliated with Make Records, LLC, based in Rancho Palos Verdes that was established in 2016 as a California entity by Aaron Michael Smart.)
- Website: corinnewest.com

Corinne West (born 1970) is an American singer-songwriter and acoustic guitarist. She was born and raised in California.

== Biography ==
At 15, while in school at Claremont High, West left home with guitar in hand to travel across America in a converted school bus. She sang in hard rock bands in Los Angeles when she was a teenager. West studied theater while enrolled at Feather River College in her mid-twenties. She restored antique biplane wings, worked as a stonemason in the rural mountains of California, and opened a fine art business in fused-glass and metal in Quincy, located in the Sierra Nevada mountains, with David Duskin (born 1974), a blacksmith.

She is known for her singing and original songwriting which is based in Americana music. Her songwriting has met with much critical acclaim and secured her a position as a finalist in the 2005 New Folk competition at the Kerrville Folk Festival. In July 2006, West was featured in an interview on the BBC Radio 2 program, Bob Harris Country, which led to a tour of England and Ireland in early 2007.

West's debut CD, Bound For the Living, was released in 2004. Her second album, Second Sight, which followed it in 2007, featured a number of notable guests, including dobro player Jerry Douglas, mandolinist Mike Marshall, and Darol Anger on fiddle. In 2009 she released a third CD, The Promise, which she co-produced with Doug Cox and recorded in Canada.

West has toured extensively, which have included performances at acclaimed festivals and clubs through the United States and abroad. In 2010 and 2011 she toured extensively as a duo with fellow songwriter and guitarist Kelly Joe Phelps. The pair released a CD in 2010 entitled Magnetic Skyline.

In 2013, West began touring with her newly formed band featuring Pam Delgado (née Pamela Denise Delgado; born 1964) and Jeri Jones (née Jeri Ellen Jones; born 1958) from Blame Sally.

== Discography ==
- Bound for the Living, Make Records, (2004); OCLC 318080794
- Second Sight, Make Records (2007)
- The Promise, Make Records (2009); OCLC 767690887
- Magnetic Skyline, with Kelly Joe Phelps, Make Records (2010); OCLC 669772713, 937814189, 842802210
- Starlight Highway, Make Records (2015); OCLC 967975431

== Collaborators ==
- Doug Cox and recorded in Canada
- Kelly Joe Phelps

== Family ==
West was born in Los Angeles to Jim Donald Brondino (born 1942), an educator, and Jeanne Marie Anderson, an author (maiden; born 1942). They divorced in 1983. West has a younger brother, Darin Brondino. Corinne – under her birth surname, on November 3, 1999, in Quincy – married artist David Urquhart Duskin (born 1974).
