= Sky Like a Broken Clock =

Studio album by Kelly Joe Phelps
- Released: July 10, 2001
- Recorded: February 6–13, 2001, Long View Farm
- Genre: Blues, country blues
- Label: Rykodisc
- Producer: George Howard

Kelly Joe Phelps chronology
| Shine Eyed Mister Zen (1999) | Sky Like a Broken Clock (2001) | Beggar's Oil (2002) |

Sky Like a Broken Clock is an album by American blues singer and guitarist Kelly Joe Phelps, released in 2001. It reached No. 8 on the Billboard Top Blues Albums charts.

== History ==
Sky Like A Broken Clock was recorded live in the studio with no overdubs. It is Phelps' first record to feature no traditional material, only his own original compositions. Phelps' first releases were essentially his voice and the voice of his slide guitar. He assembled a band and put aside the slide guitar to focus on his fingerpicking style for this release.

== Reception ==
Professional ratings
Review scores
| Source | Rating |
|---|---|
| AllMusic | 3/5 stars |
| The Penguin Guide to Blues Recordings | 2/4 stars |

Music critic Travis Draeset wrote in his AllMusic review "The result is a set of low-key, abstract story-songs about voodoo, sin, and prostitution, with "Worn Out," the album's closer, having a lullaby-like quality. Phelps' guitar work on this album is fairly straightforward (unfortunately not featuring his signature acoustic slide)."

Buzz McClain of No Depression noted the spontaneity of the recording, writing "The result is understandably raw and primitive, evocative and emotionally effective, made the more so by Phelps’ weary voice and his precise fingerpicking, which is every bit as impressive as his slide... This is a mature piece of art, made all the more poignant by the pick-up nature of an ensemble that, somehow, sounds strikingly seasoned."

PopMatters critic Fred Kovey is equivocal, writing: "Phelps does everything right, but it isn’t quite enough. His style of Blues and Celtic influenced singer-songwriting has become so identified with adult contemporary that just being good isn’t enough to pull the casual fan from his torpor... Phelps is an excellent guitar player. More than anything else, his skill with an acoustic six string is what makes him special. But to appreciate his guitar playing you’ll have to listen to the songs over and over; fans may want to, but I doubt the same is true of casual listeners... It offers the pleasure of viewing a master craftsman at work, but that pleasure isn’t quite enough."

== Track listing ==
All songs written by Kelly Joe Phelps.

1. "Taylor John" – 5:43
2. "Clementine" – 6:10
3. "Sally Ruby" – 4:08
4. "Beggar's Oil" – 3:24
5. "Flash Cards" – 5:51
6. "Gold Tooth" – 6:49
7. "Tommy" – 5:28
8. "Fleashine" – 5:31
9. "Mr. My Go" – 6:52
10. "Worn Out" – 5:07

== Personnel ==
- Kelly Joe Phelps - vocals, guitar
- Larry Taylor - bass
- Billy Conway - drums, percussion
- Tom West - Hammond organ
- Dinty Child - pump organ, accordion
- David Henry - cello
- Jim Fitting - harmonica

== Production ==
- Produced by George Howard
- Mixed by George Howard and David Henry
- Mastered by Jeff Lipton
