= Youth of America (Birdbrain song) =

- The cover of the Youth of America single

Single by Birdbrain

from the album Let's Be Nice
- A-side: "Youth of America"
- B-side: "-"
- Released: 1997
- Recorded: February 1997
- Genre: Post-grunge
- Length: 3:03
- Label: TVT Records
- Songwriter(s): Joey Ammo
- Producer(s): Tim Patalan

Birdbrain singles chronology
""Glue/Jet""	"Youth of America"

"Youth of America" is Birdbrain's final and most successful single. It was the first single from their 1997 album Let's Be Nice, and was featured in the hit film Scream. It can also be heard in the movie Masterminds starring Patrick Stewart and Vincent Kartheiser.

== Music video ==
The video features parts of Scream, along with footage of the band driving in a van, and playing at the scene of a murder.
