= Bliss (Birdbrain album) =

Studio album by Birdbrain
- Released: August 15, 1995
- Recorded: 1995 Newbury sound, Boston, Massachusetts.
- Genre: Post-grunge
- Length: 45:27
- Label: TVT Records
- Producer: Joey Ammo, James Dennis

Birdbrain chronology
| Princess | Bliss (1995) | Let's Be Nice (1997) |

Professional ratings
Review scores
| Source | Rating |
|---|---|
| Allmusic | link |

Bliss is Birdbrain's debut studio album. It was recorded in 1995 at Newbury Sound, Boston, Massachusetts and released by TVT Records on August 15, 1995. Before Bliss, the band's only other releases was a demo tape, the song "Violence" on an anthology of Boston rock. It was their only album to have James Dennis on it. Despite a tour and promotion from TVT, the album was not successful. After the tour, on the eve of starting pre-production for the second album "Let's Be Nice" guitarist James Dennis was driven from the band over creative differences.

== Track listing ==
All songs written by Joey Ammo, except where noted.

1. "Confession" - 4:58
2. "Drown" - 3:56
3. "Hometown" - 4:05
4. "Roslindale" - 5:03
5. "Booga" (Ammo, James Dennis) - 3:25
6. "Gash" - 3:04
7. "Circlejerk" - 2:40
8. "Soundking" - 3:51
9. "Friends" - 6:31
10. "Pervert" (Ammo, Berzerk) - 0:51
11. "Jena" - 3:47
12. "Roses" - 8:02

== Personnel ==
- Joey Ammo (Amicangelo) (Vocals, guitar, production)
- James Dennis (Guitar, vocals, production)
- Joseph McCarthy Jr. (Bass, vocals)
- Mike Benway (Drums)
- Frankie Butkus (Engineering)
- Alan Pahanish (Percussion)
- Billy Sheerin (Additional guitar)

== Singles ==
- "Confession"
- "Roslindale"

== Music videos ==
"Confession" was the only music video made for the album.
