= Lead Me On (Kelly Joe Phelps album) =

Studio album by Kelly Joe Phelps
- Released: May 1994
- Recorded: Dead Aunt Thelma's
- Genre: Blues, country blues
- Length: 70:22
- Label: Burnside

Kelly Joe Phelps chronology
Lead Me On (1994)	Roll Away the Stone (1997)

Lead Me On is the debut album by American blues singer and guitarist Kelly Joe Phelps. It is his first release on the Burnside label before moving to Rykodisc Records.

== Reception ==
Professional ratings
Review scores
Source	Rating
AllMusic	4/5 stars
The Penguin Guide to Blues Recordings	3/4 stars

AllMusic critic Roch Parisien wrote: "This is the real deal — Phelps performs with the full authority and authenticity of the Delta blues tradition without ever once sounding like a Folkways museum piece."

== Track listing ==
All songs written by Kelly Joe Phelps except as noted.

1. "I've Been Converted" (Traditional) – 6:16
2. "Hard Time Killin' Floor Blues" (Skip James) – 5:24
3. "Where Do I Go Now" – 5:33
4. "Love Me Baby Blues" (Joe Calicott) – 4:41
5. "Lead Me On" – 4:46
6. "Jesus Make Up My Dying Bed" (Traditional) – 5:17
7. "Leavin' Blues" (Herman Johnson) – 5:54
8. "Marking Stone Blues" – 4:58
9. "The Black Crow Keeps Flying" – 4:17
10. "I'd Be a Rich Man" – 4:44
11. "Someone to Save Me" – 6:35
12. "Motherless Children" (Traditional)– 7:24
13. "Fare Thee Well" – 4:33

== Personnel ==
- Kelly Joe Phelps – vocals, guitar, stomp box
- Engineered by Mike Moore
- Executive producer – Terry Carrier
- Photos by James Rexroad, Project 47
