= Children of Chaos (Soulidium album) =

Children Of Chaos

Studio album by Soulidium
- Released: June 19, 2007
- Recorded: 2006–2007, Tampa, Florida
- Studio: Long View Farm, North Brookfield, Massachusetts
- Genre: Nu metal
- Length: 42:44
- Label: KnightVision Music/Adrenaline
- Producer: Danny Bernini; Michael McKnight; Bob Ludwig; Jeff Bova; Bonnie Milner

Soulidium chronology
Children Of Chaos (2007)	Awaken (2015)

Singles from Children Of Chaos
- 1. "The Light" Released: 2007; 2. "Trapped" Released: 2007; 3. "Drama" Released: 2008

Children Of Chaos is the debut album by American alternative metal band Soulidium. The album was released in 2007. The song "Trapped" was also featured on the Saw IV soundtrack. A follow-up to this album, Fly 2 The Sun, is set to release on August 20, 2011.

== Track listing ==
No.	Title	Writer(s)	Length
1.	"Soulidification Sequence"	Michael McKnight	0:20
2.	"Trapped"	McKnight, Aj Maldonado	3:41
3.	"The Light"	McKnight, Aj Maldonado, Eric Beausoleil, Danny Cayocca	3:58
4.	"Live Forever"	McKnight, Jake Jaden	3:49
5.	"Drama"	McKnight, Aj Maldonado, Cayocca	3:46
6.	"About You"	McKnight, Aj Maldonado, Beausoleil, Cayocca, Jaden	5:20
7.	"Easy Kind of Girl"	McKnight, Beausoleil	4:13
8.	"Waiting"	McKnight, Aj Maldonado, Beausoleil	3:24
9.	"Crucify"	McKnight, Aj Maldonado	3:25
10.	"Jaded Messiah"	McKnight, Aj Maldonado	4:00
11.	"The Big Time"	McKnight, Aj Maldonado, Beausoleil, Cayocca	3:22
12.	"Slowly We Die"	McKnight, Aj Maldonado, Beausoleil	3:45

== Reception ==
=== Critical ===
- 411Mania
- CD Universe (4.8/5)
- Hard Rock Hideout

== Personnel ==
Soulidium

- Michael McKnight - Vocals/Songwriting
- AJ Maldonado - Guitar
- Eric "Monsieur" Beausoleil - Guitar
- Jake Jaden - Bass
- Danny Cayocca - Drums

Production

- Danny Bernini - producer
- Michael McKnight - producer
- Bob Ludwig - mastering
- Jeff Bova - strings
- Bonnie Milner - vocal production
