= Awaken (Soulidium album) =

Studio album by Soulidium
- Released: October 30, 2015
- Recorded: 2009–2011
- Studio: Jan Smith Studios, Atlanta, Georgia
- Genre: Alternative metal, hard rock
- Length: 47:12
- Label: Independent
- Producer: Shawn Grove, Toby Wright, Michael McKnight

Soulidium chronology
Children of Chaos (2007)	Awaken (2015)

Singles from Awaken
- 1. "Fly 2 the Sun" Released: May 1, 2011; 2. "Calling" Released: October 25, 2015

Awaken is the second and final studio album by American rock band Soulidium. It is the first release since their 2007 debut, Children of Chaos. A demo EP of Fly 2 the Sun (the album's original name) was originally scheduled to be released on August 20, 2011, but was canceled upon the band entering discussions for a major label release. After years of delay, the album was self-released on October 30, 2015.

== Background ==
Since 2007's Children of Chaos, frontman Michael McKnight had been working on music for a second album. Band members AJ Maldonado, Eric Beausoleil, Jake Jaden, and Danny Cayocca all either quit or were kicked out of the band for various reasons following the band's debut release. This led to McKnight replacing the former members with touring members Jadis Lucien and Chris Polidoro, both of whom were replaced before writing or releasing any media with the band. Guitarist Shadow Morte joined the band in 2008 and former drummer Danny Cayocca came back to the band in 2008, creating an incomplete three-piece band. In 2010, Michael McKnight found bassist Ilyn Nathaniel and second guitarist Spyder Zero Prime to complete the lineup and allow the band to begin recording a second album.

The band recorded from late 2010 until early 2011 for the unnamed album at Jan Smith Studios in Atlanta, Georgia, with many of the tracks being completed in Red Rooms Studio in Tampa, FL. The track "Fly 2 The Sun" was tracked by Danny Cayocca in his personal studio, vocals being completed in Atlanta, GA. In December 2010, McKnight confirmed the title of the album to be "Fly 2 The Sun" and a tentative release date of early 2011. During touring in 2010 at the 98Rockfest in Tampa, Soulidium played alongside Sevendust where Michael McKnight reunited with frontman Lajon Witherspoon. Soulidium had previously played 45 dates with Sevendust during the summer of 2008 where Michael McKnight had originally met Lajon Witherspoon. The two agreed to work together and McKnight traveled to Georgia to record the album's title track.

Recording concluded in June 2011 after Soulidium had worked with producer Shawn Grove, who has worked with bands like Sevendust, Dashboard Confessional, and Matchbox Twenty, and producer Toby Wright, who has worked with Alice In Chains, Metallica, and Korn. Commenting on the album, Sevendust frontman and featured artist Lajon Witherspoon called the album, "The key to the box". Michael McKnight stated about the album that, "I think [a lot] of fans are going to really enjoy the hell out of what we have coming. I'm really proud of the band and everyone who's contributed to it. We can't wait to release it."

The band released the single, "Fly 2 the Sun" in May 2011. Any donation of $1 or more earned the single via email. The band announced on their website plans to release a limited edition EP on August 20, 2011 before releasing a full LP. However, the band entered discussions to sign with a major record label and therefore canceled the EP. Preorders for the EP will now be substituted for the full album upon release.

== Track listing ==
All tracks are written by Michael McKnight, except where noted.

No.	Title	Writer(s)	Length
1.	"Calling"		3:22
2.	"Fields of Fire"		3:57
3.	"Fly to the Sun" (feat. Lajon Witherspoon)		3:18
4.	"The Devil's On His Way"		4:59
5.	"Sacrificing You"		3:59
6.	"Taking Over"		4:39
7.	"Sons of Anarchy"		3:12
8.	"Run Like Hell" (Pink Floyd cover)	David Gilmour, Roger Waters	4:23
9.	"Betrayed"		3:29
10.	"A Reluctant Goodbye"		4:04
11.	"Shattered Man"		3:57
12.	"The End"		4:23

== Personnel ==
Soulidium

- Michael McKnight – Vocals
- Shadow Morte – Guitar
- Ilyn Nathaniel – Bass
- Danny Cayocca – Drums
- Spyder Zero Prime – Guitar

Additional musicians

- Lajon Witherspoon – Vocals on "Fly 2 the Sun"

Production

- Produced, mixed, and mastered by Shawn Grove and Toby Wright
- David Bolt – artwork
