= Magnetic Skyline =

Studio album by Kelly Joe Phelps, Corinne West
- Released: September 27, 2010
- Recorded: March 18 and June 7, 2010
- Genre: Americana, folk
- Length: 34:50
- Label: Make Records
- Producer: Paul Harvey, Kelly Joe Phelps, Corinne West

Kelly Joe Phelps chronology
Western Bell (2009)	Magnetic Skyline (2010)	Brother Sinner and the Whale (2012)

Corinne West chronology
The Promise (2009)	Magnetic Skyline (2010)

Magnetic Skyline is an album by American musicians Kelly Joe Phelps and Corinne West, released in 2010. Most of the songs were released previously on West's solo albums.

== Critical reception ==
Music critic Andrew Mueller wrote in his BBC review of the album "West and Phelps are a natural, effortless pairing... Phelps’ parts lend the songs a depth—in many meanings of the word—somewhat lacking from their original incarnations... If Magnetic Skyline should prove a one-off, it’ll be no less enduringly treasurable. It would be a shame, however, if its creators did not pursue this partnership further."

== Track listing ==
All songs by Corinne West unless otherwise noted.

1. "Whiskey Poet" – 4:41
2. "Mother To Child – 4:29
3. "Horseback In My Dreams" (Joe Tomaselli) – 4:21
4. "Road to No Compromise" – 4:23
5. "Lily Ann" – 3:22
6. "Lady Luck" – 4:41
7. "Amelia" (Tomaselli) – 3:53
8. "River's Fool" – 5:00

== Personnel ==
- Kelly Joe Phelps – vocals, guitar
- Corinne West – vocals, guitar

Production notes:

- Paul Harvey – producer
- Kelly Joe Phelps – producer
- Corinne West – producer
- Marc Broer – engineer
- Dann Michael Thompson – engineer, mixing
- Martijn Van Waveren – engineer
