= Fond of Tigers =

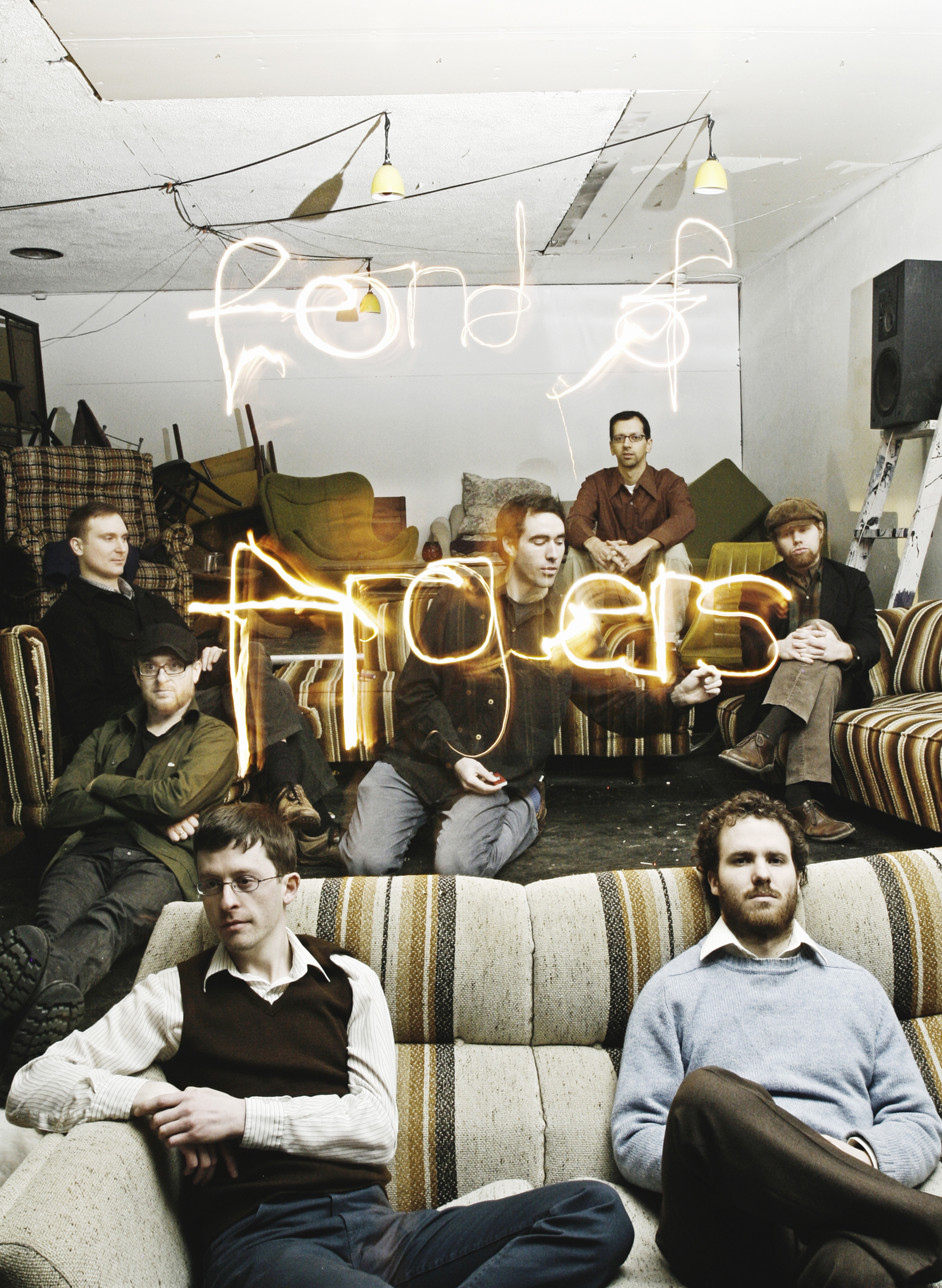

Background information
- Origin: Vancouver, BC, Canada
- Genres: Post-rock
- Years active: 2000–present
- Spinoffs: Limbs of the Stars
- Members: Stephen Lyons Morgan McDonald JP Carter Dan Gaucher Skye Brooks Shanto Acharia Jesse Zubot
- Website: fondoftigers.com

Fond of Tigers is a Canadian seven-piece post-rock instrumental band from Vancouver. An article in Exclaim! describes the band's sound: "with cacophonous explosions of percussion and guitar underlying wild strains of trumpet and violin, only to drop out for unexpected, ambient glimmers of a once-roaring piece."

== History ==
The group began in 2000 as a solo project of guitarist Stephen Lyons. After Lyons' indie rock group Beauventure disbanded, Lyons performed solo, and soon began playing along with tape loops and recorded sounds.

In 2003, the project expanded to become a full band. Band members include Stephen Lyons on guitar, JP Carter on trumpet, Morgan McDonald on piano, Jesse Zubot on violin, Shanto Acharia on bass, and Skye Brooks and Dan Gaucher on drums. In June 2006, they released the debut album, a thing to live with. Their second album, Release the Saviours, was released on November 27, 2007.

Fond of Tigers' third album, Continent & Western was released on September 21, 2010; it appeared on the !Earshot National Top 50 Chart soon after, and it won a Juno Award for best instrumental album in 2011. The albums were released on Vancouver-based label Drip Audio, operated by Jesse Zubot. Their third album, Continent & Western was a co-release with Offseason Records.

The band has performed at festivals such as the Vancouver Jazz Festival and the Festival International de Musique Actuelle de Victoriaville, the Guelph Jazz Festival, Hillside Festival, PuSh Festival, the Sled Island Music Festival, and Sappyfest.

After a hiatus of several years, in 2016 the band reconvened and released an album, Uninhabit, once again through Drip Audio, in conjunction with Offseason Records. In 2017, they were nominated for a Western Canadian Music Award.

Lyons also leads Limbs of the Stars, which features Acharia and Brooks.

== Collaborations ==
Fond of Tigers has collaborated with Swedish musician Mats Gustafsson and Toronto's Sandro Perri.
