= Old Man Luedecke =

Canadian singer-songwriter

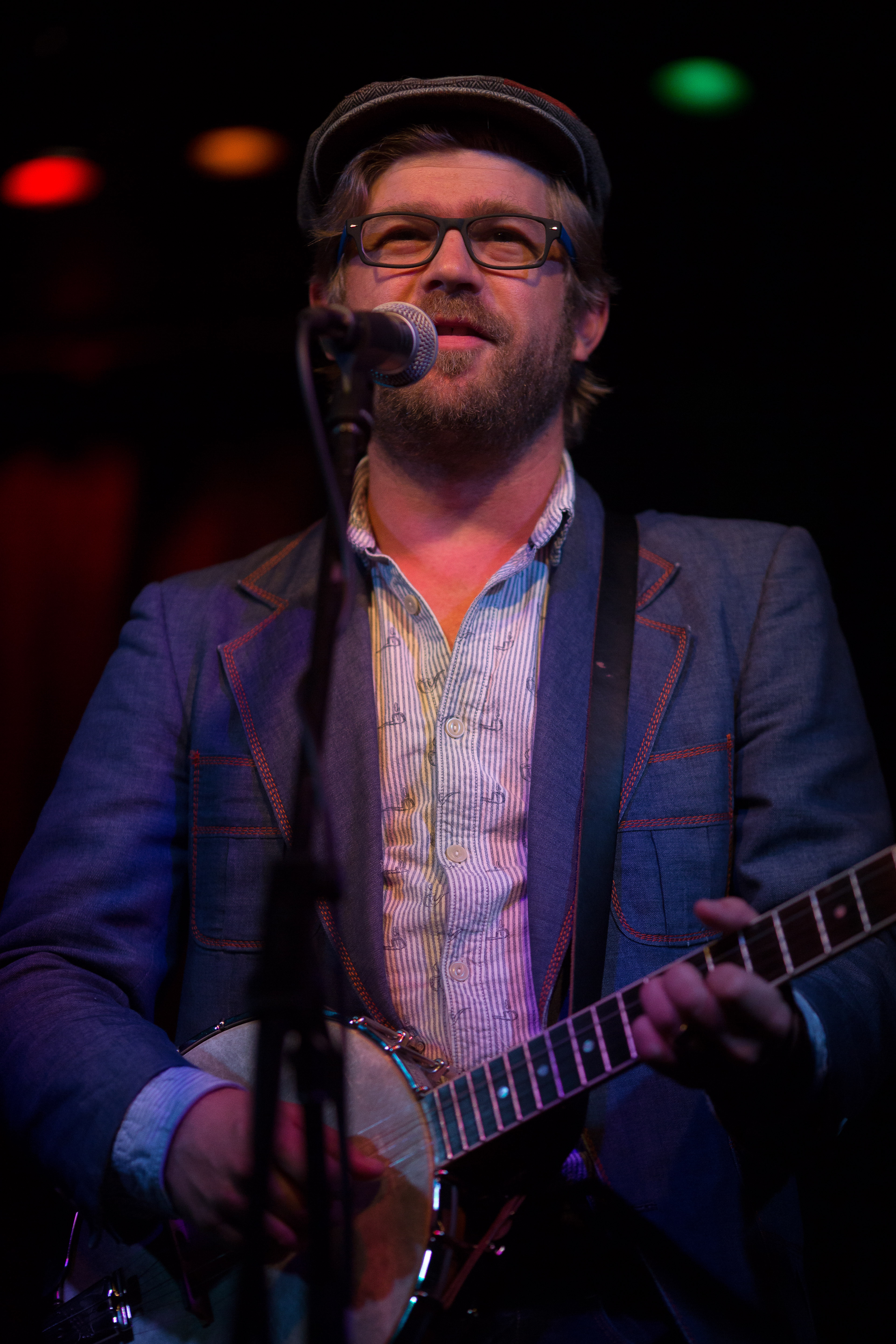
- Luedecke in November 2013

Background information
- Born: Christopher Rudolf Luedecke
- Origin: Chester, Nova Scotia, Canada
- Genres: Bluegrass; alternative country; folk
- Occupations: Singer-songwriter; musician
- Instrument: Banjo
- Labels: Black Hen Music; True North Records; Outside Music
- Members: Chris Luedecke
- Website: www.OldManLuedecke.com

Old Man Luedecke (/ˈluːdəkə/) is the recording name of Canadian singer-songwriter and banjo player Christopher “Chris” Rudolf Luedecke of Chester, Nova Scotia. He is most noted as a two-time Juno Award winner for Roots & Traditional Album of the Year – Solo, winning at the Juno Awards of 2009 for Proof of Love and at the Juno Awards of 2011 for My Hands are on Fire and Other Love Songs.

In 2012 Tender is the Night was released and picked up a Juno nomination as well as "Folk Album of the Year" from Music Nova Scotia.

Luedecke has also toured as a member of The Pan-Canadian New Folk Ensemble with Kim Barlow and Christine Fellows.

In 2019 he recorded an album, Easy Money, at Montreal's hotel2tango studio with local musicians Howard Bilerman and Afie Jurvanen and two Nashville-based recording artists, Tim O'Brien and Fats Kaplin.

His 2024 song "She Told Me Where to Go" appears in the soundtrack of the video game Pacific Drive.

== Discography ==
- Mole in the Ground (2003, out of print)
- Hinterland (2006, Black Hen Music)
- Proof of Love (2008, Black Hen Music)
- My Hands Are on Fire and Other Love Songs (2010, Black Hen Music)
- Tender Is the Night (2012, True North Records)
- I Never Sang Before I Met You (2014, True North)
- One Night Only! Live at the Chester Playhouse (2018, True North)
- Domestic Eccentric (2015, True North)
- Easy Money (2019, True North)
- She Told Me Where to Go (2024, Outside)
