= Salil Bhatt =

Indian slide guitar player

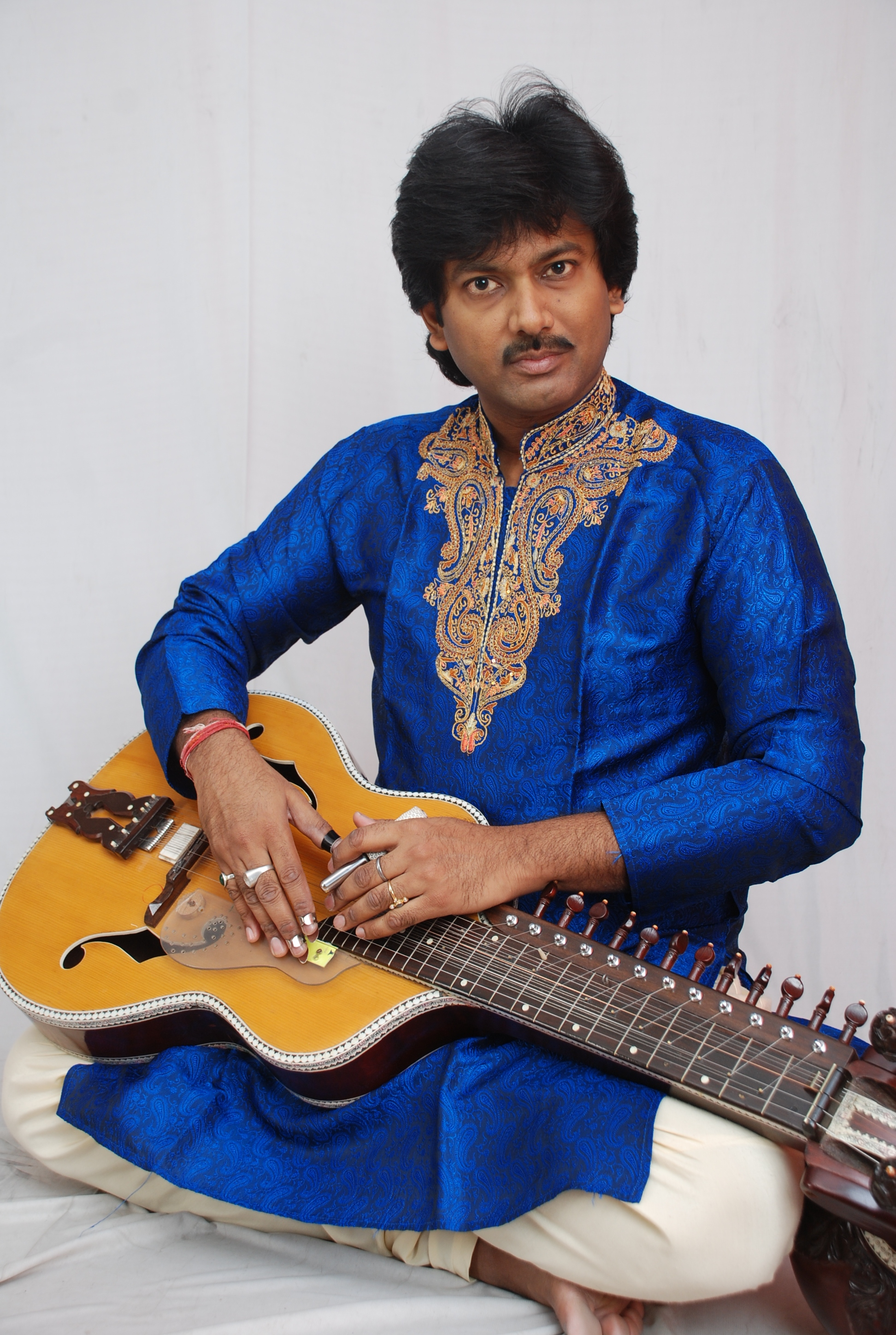
- Salil Bhatt with Satvik Veena

Background information
- Also known as: S. Bhatt
- Origin: Jaipur, Rajasthan, India
- Genre: Indian classical music
- Occupation: Satvik Veena Player
- Instrument: Satvik Veena
- Years active: 1985-present
- Website: Official site

Salil Bhatt is an Indian Satvik Veena player. and creator of Satvik Veena. He is the son of the Mohan Veena creator, player and Grammy Award winner, PadmaBhushan Vishwa Mohan Bhatt.

His latest album, Slide to Freedom 2 – Make a Better World, was nominated for a Canadian Juno Award.

== Discography ==
- Strings of Freedom
- Revitalise
- Swar Shikhar
- Sopaan
- Slide to Freedom (Part I & II)
- Out of the Shadows
- Mumbai to Munich
- Revival of Gavati
- Relax
- Karnatikas Veena Jugal-Bandi
- Mohan's Veena
