= Ram Kumar Dwivedi =

Village in Rajasthan, India

Ram Kumar Dwivedi is a small village of Pali district, Rajasthan, India.
