= Shine Eyed Mister Zen =

Studio album by Kelly Joe Phelps
- Released: July 13, 1999
- Recorded: The Barley Cap, Portland, Oregon
- Genre: Blues, country blues
- Length: 57:47
- Label: Rykodisc
- Producer: Kelly Joe Phelps

Kelly Joe Phelps chronology
Roll Away the Stone (1997)	Shine Eyed Mister Zen (1999)	Sky Like a Broken Clock (2001)

Shine Eyed Mister Zen is the third album by American blues artist Kelly Joe Phelps, released in 1999.

Shine Eyed Mister Zen was recorded at Phelps' home with all the tracks recorded in single takes. The title relates to Phelps' own description of his way of playing.

== Reception ==
Professional ratings
Review scores
Source	Rating
Allmusic	4/5 stars
Freight Train Boogie	4/5 stars
The Graham Weekly Album Review	(favorable)
No Depression	(favorable)
The Penguin Guide to Blues Recordings	3/4 stars

Writing for Allmusic, music critic Michael Gallucci called the album "an accomplished serving of country blues that combines the sweet and sour power of his guitar playing with the equally bittersweet charge of Phelps' wearied voice... A mystical and unaffected recording." Jim Merkel of No Depression magazine wrote "Phelps’ songwriting also deserves notice. One would be hard-pressed to tell the originals interspersed among the traditional blues tunes here without looking at the credits. He also can take an old warhorse such as “Goodnight Irene” and strip away its tired reputation to reveal its underlying sense of quiet defeatism... Although subtle and compact, his playing never sacrifices fiery tension." While praising the album, George Graham wrote "Sonically this album is respectable but could be improved upon. It's a bit odd in stereo, with the vocals slightly off to the left and the guitar tending toward the right, instead of having the guitar miked in stereo to give it some depth. The guitar sound, though pleasing, could have been a bit richer and warmer. The dynamic range is decent, though some compression was applied which is audible in spots detracting from the subtleties of this all-acoustic performance." Bill Frater of Freight Train Boogie wrote "This is peerless music that one hears with one's soul as much as with one's ears."

== Track listing ==
All songs written by Kelly Joe Phelps except as noted.

1. "The House Carpenter" (Traditional) – 6:43
2. "River Rat Jimmy" – 3:32
3. "Hobo's Son" – 4:07
4. "Katy" – 6:13
5. "Wandering Away" – 5:05
6. "Dock Boggs Country Blues" (Dock Boggs) – 6:23
7. "Capman Bootman" – 4:55
8. "Train Carried My Girl from Town" (Frank Hutchinson) – 4:25
9. "Piece by Piece" – 6:30
10. "Many a Time" – 4:15
11. "Goodnight Irene" (Lead Belly,) – 5:39

== Personnel ==
- Kelly Joe Phelps – vocals, guitar
- Dave Mathis – harmonica on "Piece By Piece"

== Production ==
- Engineered and mixed by Riley Wilson
- Mastered by Toby Mountain, Northeastern Digital Recording, Southborough, MA
