= Tender Is the Night (Old Man Luedecke album) =

Studio album by Old Man Luedecke
- Released: November 13, 2012
- Genre: Folk
- Length: 35:49
- Label: True North
- Producer: Tim O'Brien

Old Man Luedecke chronology
My Hands Are on Fire (2010)	Tender Is the Night (2012)

Professional ratings
Aggregate scores
Source	Rating
Metacritic	70/100
Review scores
Source	Rating
Now	4/5 stars

Tender Is the Night is the fifth studio album by Canadian musician Old Man Luedecke. It was released in November 2012 under True North Records.

== Track listing ==
All tracks are written by Old Man Luedecke

No.	Title	Length
1.	"Kingdom Come"	3:24
2.	"Jonah & the Whale"	2:57
3.	"Tortoise and the Hare"	2:36
4.	"Tender Is the Night"	2:36
5.	"Broken Heart Buddy"	2:48
6.	"Little Stream of Whiskey"	2:41
7.	"A&W Song"	2:00
8.	"I'm Fine"	2:49
9.	"Song For Ian Tyson"	3:24
10.	"This May Hurt a Bit"	2:39
11.	"Can't Count Tears in the Ocean"	3:18
12.	"Roll in My Sweet Baby's Arms"	1:59
13.	"Long Suffering Jesus"	2:38

iTunes Deluxe Edition
No.	Title	Length
14.	"Delia and Wilhelmina" (Featuring Lake of Stew)	3:26
15.	"Phone Is Tapped" (Featuring Lake of Stew)	2:24
16.	"Too Much Too Late" (Featuring Lake of Stew)	2:52
17.	"Sleeping In" (Featuring Lake of Stew)	4:18
18.	"Monsanto Jones" (Featuring Lake of Stew)	3:07
19.	"Tap Water" (Featuring Lake of Stew)	4:45
20.	"Biscuit Crumb Ditty" (Featuring Lake of Stew)	2:53

== Personnel ==
- Mike Bub - bass
- Kenny Malone - percussion
- Tim O’Brien - mandolin, fiddle, vocals, bouzouki, guitar
- Chris Luedecke - vocals, banjo, guitar
