= Zubot and Dawson =

Canadian folk duo from Vancouver

Zubot and Dawson were a folk duo from Vancouver, British Columbia, Canada, that consisted of Jesse Zubot on fiddle and Steve Dawson on guitar. They played largely folk-inspired acoustic music and released three albums. They toured both North America and Europe. In 2003 they won a Juno Award for the album Chicken Scratch.

== History ==
Dawson attended Berklee School of Music and began to work together with Jesse Zubot as the Spirit Merchants, which involved had a constantly changing rhythm section. With a changing focus, Zubot and Dawson reduced the project to a duo, using their own names, with a more acoustic focus. In order to have their material released, Dawson set up his own label, Black Hen. Their first album, Strang was a reference to a self-proclaimed genre, while their album Tractor Parts: Further Adventures In Strang (2000), was nominated for a Juno Award in 2001. They released their final album Chicken Scratch in 2002, which received the 2003 Juno Award for Roots & Traditional Album of the Year for a Group. The duo ceased to function as Dawson preferred to focus on his production work and reduce his travel commitments and Zubot wanted to stretch out musically into other genres as well as concentrate on album production and film scoring.

== Members ==
Zubot plays fiddle and mandolin as well as electric mandolin while Dawson plays acoustic, tremolo acoustic, National tricone and Weissenborn Hawaiian guitar. While the group started as a duo, other players were added over the years. Andrew Downing joined Zubot and Dawson as a double bass player. Elliot Polsky joined the group as percussion player. The group also occasionally features musical friends such as Bob Brozman and Kelly Joe Phelps.

Dawson and Zubot both participate in the project Great Uncles of the Revolution.

== Discography ==
Albums

- 1998: Strang (Black Hen Music)
- 2000: Tractor Parts: Further Adventures in Strang (Black Hen Music)
- 2002: Chicken Scratch (True North)
