= Great Uncles of the Revolution =

Canadian bluegrass/jazz band

Great Uncles of the Revolution is a Canadian band that consists of Jesse Zubot, a violinist/mandolinist, and Steve Dawson, a guitarist/dobro player. Their musical style draws on contemporary bluegrass and jazz.

== History ==
In 2001, the band released an album, Great Uncles of the Revolution Stand Up!. Jazz trumpeter Kevin Turcotte plays on the album, along with bassist Andrew Downing, who composed much of the music. The album won a 2002 West Coast Music Award.

The Great Uncles performed at the Festival International de Jazz de Montréal in 2002, winning the Grand Prix de Jazz. In 2003, the Great Uncles performed in western Canada, and worked on a follow-up album. The result, bLOW tHE hOUSE dOWN won a 2004 Juno Award as Contemporary Jazz Album of the Year. Two of the songs on the album were composed by Turcotte.

The group continued to perform occasionally for several more years, although its members were busy with other musical collaborations.
