= Ramkumar Mishra =

Pandit Ramkumar Mishra
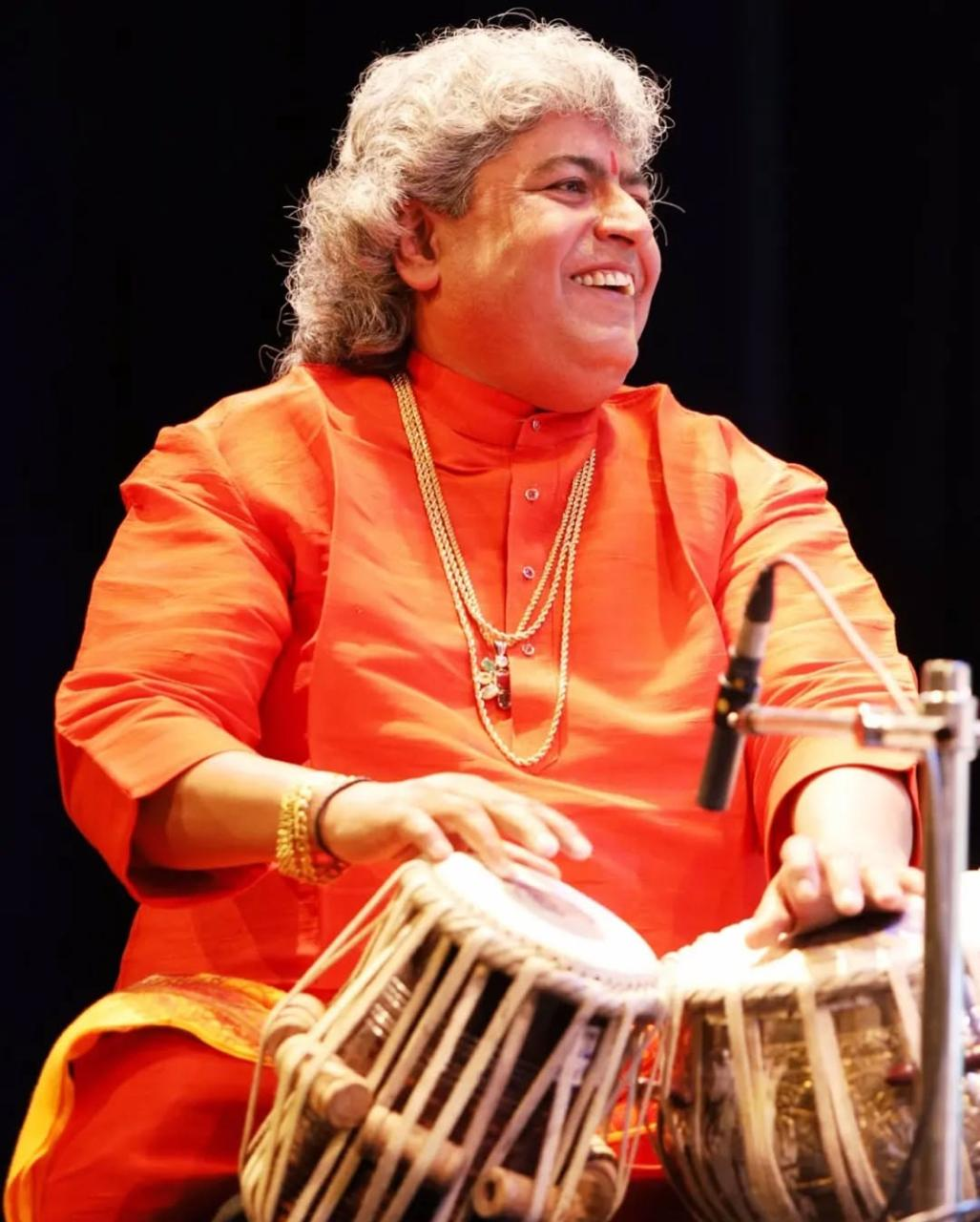
- Pt. Ramkumar Mishra performing at a classical concert

Background information
- Born: June 16, 1964 (age 62); Varanasi, Uttar Pradesh
- Genre: Hindustani classical music
- Occupation: Tabla Maestro
- Instrument: Tabla
- Years active: 1984–present

Pt. Ramkumar Mishra (born 16 June 1964) is an Indian tabla player of the Banaras gharana. Known for his mastery of traditional compositions and improvisational skill, he has performed at leading classical music festivals and concerts in India and abroad.

== Early life and training ==
Pt. RamKumar Mishra was born in Ning, Varanasi, Uttar Pradesh, into a family of musicians. His grandfather, Pandit Anokhe Lal Mishra was a famous tabla maestro, and his father, Pandit Chhannulal Mishra, is among the noted Indian Classical singer in India who has achieve global recognition.

He began training in tabla at an early age under his grand father and maternal uncle Vijay Shankar Mishra. Later, he absorbed the stylistic features of the Banaras gharana through advanced mentorship, which shaped his distinctive clarity of bols various 'tasks' and rhythmic variations setting him apart as a living legend.

== Career ==
Pandit Ramkumar Mishra has performed widely across India and abroad appearing at festivals such as the Dover Lane Music Conference, the Sawai Gandharva Bhimsen Mahotsav, and the Tansen Samaroh.

Internationally, he has toured in Europe, the United States, and the Middle East. In 2015, he conducted seminars and concerts in Athens, Greece, organized by the Hellenic–Indian Society for Culture and Development (EL.IN.E.P.A.).

His playing is noted for intricate rhythmic improvisation and adaptability across vocal, instrumental, and dance accompaniment. He has also contributed to recordings and live albums of Hindustani classical music.

== Teaching and mentorship ==
Mishra has trained numerous students in India and abroad through workshops, residencies, and private tutelage. He has collaborated with cultural institutions including Sangeet Natak Akademi’s outreach initiatives and independent gurukuls. Several of his disciples are now active as performers and teachers of the Banaras gharana style.

== Awards and recognition ==
Mishra has been honoured with several awards for his contribution to Indian classical percussion, including:

- Yash Bharti Award (Uttar Pradesh government, year)
- Tabla Shiromani Award (institution, year)
- Taal Mani Award (Sur Singar Samsad, year)
- Laya Bhaskar Award (institution, year)
- Brahmanaad Lifetime Achievement Award (year)

== Personal life ==
Pt Ramkumar Mishra currently lives in Delhi where he continues to perform and mentor students. He is actively involved with cultural foundations that promote Hindustani classical music and has uphold the Banaras gharana tradition. His son Rahul Mishra is famous tabla player with a rich lineage and upholding the family traditions of classical music.

== See also ==
- Chhannulal Mishra
- Tabla

== Life and career ==
Pandit Ramkumar Mishra is the grandson of Pandit Anokhelal Mishra from Banaras gharana and son of Pandit Chhannulal Mishra. Pandit Ramkumar was initiated into tabla playing by his mother, Smt. Manorama Mishra, daughter of Pandit Anokhelal Mishra, and, thereafter, received his tutelage under another renowned tabla player, Pandit Chhote Lal Mishra, his maternal uncle.

Some of the awards he has received are:

- Taal Mani Award.
- Haridas, Mumbai.
- Laya Bhaskar, Natraj Cultural Centre, Melbourne, Australia.
- Tabla Shiromani, Government of Bihar.
- Award from Darwin, Australia.
