= Jesse Zubot =

Canadian musician

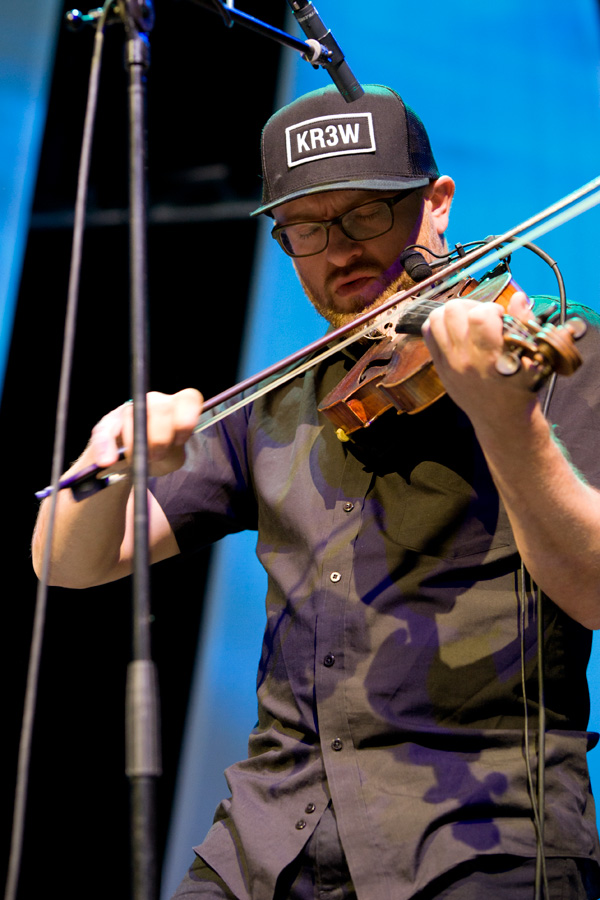
- Jesse Zubot, Moers Festival 2012

Background information
- Born: Leader, Saskatchewan, Canada
- Instruments: Violin; viola; mandolin; guitar
- Member of: Zubot and Dawson, Great Uncles of the Revolution
- Website: jessezubot.com

Jesse Zubot is a Canadian musician primarily known for his violin playing. Zubot also works as a composer, producer and recording engineer.

== History ==
Zubot's acoustic-instrumental group Zubot and Dawson won a Juno Award in 2003 for Roots & Traditional Group Album of the Year. Zubot was also a member of Great Uncles of the Revolution in this era.

Since 2003, Zubot has toured with Tanya Tagaq, Dan Mangan, 7-piece art-rock ensemble Fond of Tigers, Stars, Hawksley Workman, Ndidi Onukwulu, Jim Byrnes, Kelly Joe Phelps and others. Zubot is a member of the seven-piece post-everything ensemble Fond of Tigers.

Since the early 2000s Zubot has spent time working in the improvised and creative music scenes with artists such as Evan Parker, Jean Martin, François Houle, Joe Fonda, Mats Gustafsson, Orkestra Rova, Dylan van der Schyff, Tony Wilson, Fred Frith, Peggy Lee, David Tronzo, Gerry Hemingway, Henry Kaiser, Matthew Bourne, Nels Cline, Humcrush, and others.

Zubot created Drip Audio in 2005. Drip Audio is a record label from the Vancouver underground scene and now includes creations by musicians from Toronto, Montreal, Los Angeles, New York and London.

Zubot has produced recordings for artists Tanya Tagaq, Alpha Yaya Diallo, Inhabitants, Ndidi Onukwulu, Fond of Tigers, Viviane Houle, Tony Wilson, Copilots, The Sands, and others. He has appeared as a session musician on recordings by Destroyer, Stars, Dan Mangan, Justin Rutledge, Mother Mother, Amy Millan, Tanya Tagaq, Louise Burns, Veda Hille, Alan Doyle, Kelly Joe Phelps, Frog Eyes, Kathryn Calder, Alpha Yaya Diallo, Long John Baldry, Joe Keithley, Raffi, Jadea Kelly, Secret Mommy and The Be Good Tanyas.

Zubot's score for Benoît Lachambre & Su-Feh Lee's Body Scan was presented, with the piece, at the Centre Pompidou in Paris (March, 2009). Zubot has composed pieces for both the Winnipeg Symphony Orchestra and Symphony Nova Scotia, as well as scores for numerous films and television series.

A live album by Tagaq, called Anuraaqtuq, featuring Zubot on violin and viola, was released in the fall of 2011 on Victo Records. This concert was recorded at The Festival International de Musique Actuelle de Victoriaville in 2010.

== Discography ==
- 1998: Zubot & Dawson - Strang (Black Hen Music)
- 2000: Zubot & Dawson - Further Adventures in Strang: Tractor Parts (Black Hen Music)
- 2001: Great Uncles of the Revolution - Stand Up (Black Hen Music)
- 2002: Zubot & Dawson - Chicken Scratch (True North Records)
- 2003: Great Uncles of the Revolution - Blow The House Down (Black Hen Music)
- 2005: Zubotta (Drip Audio)
- 2005: LaConnor (Drip Audio)
- 2006: Fond of Tigers - A Thing to Live With (Drip Audio)
- 2006: Jesse Zubot - Dementia (Drip Audio)
- 2007: ZMF Trio - Circle The Path (Drip Audio)
- 2007: Tony Wilson 6tet - Pearls Before Swine (Drip Audio)
- 2007: Fond of Tigers - Release the Saviours (Drip Audio)
- 2009: Gord Grdina's East Van Strings - The Breathing of Statues (Songlines)
- 2010: Fond of Tigers - Continent & Western (Drip Audio)
- 2010: The Element Choir - At Rosedale United (Barnyard Records)
- 2011: Tanya Tagaq - Anuraaqtuq (Victo Records)
- 2012: Gordon Grdina's Haram - Her Eyes Illuminate (Songlines)
- 2014: Tanya Tagaq - Animism (Six Shooter Records)
- 2014: Hector and the Search For Happiness (Original Motion Picture Soundtrack) - Various Artists (Varèse Sarabande Records)
- 2015: Dan Mangan + Blacksmith - Club Meds (Arts & Crafts)
- 2015: Tony Wilson 6Tet - A Day's Life (Drip Audio)
- 2016: Fond of Tigers - Uninhabit (Drip Audio/Offseason Records)

== Awards ==
Award	Date of ceremony	Category	Work	Result	Ref(s)
Canadian Screen Awards	2015	Best Original Score	Hector and the Search for Happiness with Dan Mangan	Nominated	
Canadian Screen Awards	2017	Best Original Score	Two Lovers and a Bear	Nominated	
Canadian Screen Awards	2023	Best Original Song	"You Are My Bones" — Bones of Crows with Marie Clements, Wayne Lavallee	Nominated	
Canadian Screen Music Awards	2023	Best Original Song	"You Are My Bones" — Bones of Crows with Marie Clements, Wayne Lavallee	Won	
Canadian Screen Music Awards	2024	Best Original Score for a Documentary Feature Film	Resident Orca with Josh Zubot	Nominated	
Canadian Screen Music Awards	2024	Best Original Score for a Dramatic Series or Special	Bones of Crows with Wayne Lavallee	Nominated	
Juno Awards	2015	Producer of the Year	"Caribou", "Uja" — Animism by Tanya Tagaq	Nominated	

== See also ==
- Music of Canada
- List of Canadian musicians
