= Masterminds (1997 film) =

1997 film by Roger Christian

- Theatrical release poster
- Directed by: Roger Christian
- Screenplay by: Floyd Byars
- Story by: Floyd Byars; Alex Siskin; Chris Black
- Produced by: Floyd Byars; Robert Dudelson
- Starring: Patrick Stewart; Vincent Kartheiser; Brenda Fricker; Brad Whitford; Matt Craven
- Cinematography: Nic Morris
- Edited by: Robin Russell
- Music by: Anthony Marinelli
- Production companies: Columbia Pictures; Pacific Motion Pictures
- Distributed by: Sony Pictures Releasing
- Release date: 22 August 1997
- Running time: 105 minutes
- Country: United States
- Language: English
- Box office: $1.8 million

Masterminds is a 1997 American action comedy film directed by Roger Christian, written by Floyd Byers and starring Patrick Stewart, Vincent Kartheiser, Brenda Fricker, Brad Whitford, and Matt Craven. It tells the story of a computer engineering prodigy who matches wits with a security consultant who has taken over his stepsister's school as a ransom is demanded for their release.

== Plot ==
Oswald "Ozzie" Paxton is a computer engineering prodigy and expert hacker whose actions often have his father Jake threatening to send him to military school if he does not shape up. One day, he begins an unauthorized download of a soon-to-be-released movie. His download is interrupted when his younger stepsister Melissa Randall enters his room without permission. The resulting squabble between them results in Jake and Melissa's mother Helen intervening. In the process, Jake discovers the illicit download and Helen punishes Ozzie, making him take Melissa to her private school Shady Glen.

He takes her there by skateboard where they run into Principal Claire Maloney and security consultant Rafe Bentley where it was revealed that Maloney previously expelled Ozzie which she explained to Bentley why security measures were taken after the "science room burnout" that Ozzie caused. Before he can get out of the school, Bentley and his crew of "security guards" use a variety of firearms and tranquilizer dart guns to subdue several staff members, lock down the school, and hold the children hostage. Bentley has planned stages of a ransom scheme involving their parents' corporations. Ozzie attempts to alert Melissa to the danger. She does not believe him and he is subsequently chased by one of the gunmen. Using a bunsen burner and a vial of acid, he is able to subdue his pursuer. He subsequently begins wreaking havoc with Bentley's computerized security system.

The police make several attempts to breach the school's perimeter only to run into automatic gunfire, rocket launchers, and mines. As a concession, Bentley releases most of the children, but keeps the ten richest like Melissa and demands a very large ransom for their return. Ozzie locates ten of the eleven children and rescues them, but Melissa has been taken by Bentley. He then places an improvised time bomb at the bottom of the school's indoor pool. He attempts to stop the ransom payment, but finds out too late that the man designated to deliver it named Foster Deroy was actually Bentley's confederate. Bentley ties Ozzie to a chair and leaves with his men, keeping Melissa as an insurance policy. They intend to escape through the sewer pipes using ATVs.

While Ozzie is struggling to free himself, the bomb explodes, flooding the school's lower levels and neutralizing nearly everyone there. Ozzie and his friend K-Dog seize an abandoned ATV and pursue Bentley. They rescue Melissa, but Bentley escapes with the ransom. However, Ozzie is able to blow the whistle on Deroy with a little help from Maloney who also witnessed Rafe's actions. Through his cellphone, the police trace Rafe's employer to the CEO of a rival corporation named Larry Millard, who masterminded the plot so that the money used for the bidding would be given to terrorists so he could win a bidding war against the corporation run by Miles Lawrence that is employing Jake.

Soon afterward, Bentley sees a light at the end of the tunnel only to discover that the light leads to a sewage reclamation plant. The money begins to sink into the sewage as police officers arrive to arrest him.

== Cast ==
- Patrick Stewart as Rafe Bentley, a security consultant who takes over Shady Glen.
- Vincent Kartheiser as Oswald "Ozzie" Paxton, a computer-engineering prodigy and hacker who matches wits with Rafe.
- Brenda Fricker as Claire Maloney, the principal of Shady Glen.
- Brad Whitford as Miles Lawrence, the CEO of a company that Rafe demands a ransom from after he previously fired Rafe for embezzlement.
- Matt Craven as Jake Paxton, a businessman and the father of Ozzie.
- Annabelle Gurwitch as Helen Randall, Ozzie's stepmother.
- Jon Abrahams as "K-Dog", Ozzie's friend
- Katie Stuart as Melissa Randall, Ozzie's stepsister.
- Michael MacRae as Foster Deroy, the CFO of Miles' company and an ally of Rafe.
- Callum Keith Rennie as Ollie, one of Rafe's minions.
- Earl Pastko as Captain Jankel
- Jason Schombing as Marvin
- Michael David Simms as Colonel Duke
- David Paul Grove as "Ferret", one of Rafe's minions.
- Pamela Martin as TV Reporter
- Teryl Rothery as Ms. Saunders
- Vanessa Morley as Gabby Lawrence, the daughter of Miles who attends Shady Glen.
- Jay Brazeau as Eliot, the gate guard at Shady Glen.
- Michael Benyaer as Taxi Driver
- Jim Byrnes as Larry Millard (uncredited), the CEO of a company that is the rival of Miles' company.

== Production ==
On site locations included Hatley Castle in Colwood, British Columbia, as well as locations in Victoria and Vancouver. While on-site filming took place in British Columbia, Canada, studio filming took place in Shepperton Studios in England.

== Performance ==
In a release from Studio Briefing, Masterminds was listed as a box office flop for the Labor Day box office weekend, grossing only $1.8 million.

== Reception ==
On Rotten Tomatoes the film has an approval rating of 19% based on reviews from 16 critics.

Roger Ebert of the Chicago Sun-Times panned the film, saying "all of the pieces have been assembled from better films, but then there are few worse films to borrow from" but had some praise for Stewart "the sole remaining interest comes from the presence of Stewart."
