= Kelly Joe Phelps =

American musician and songwriter (1959–2022)

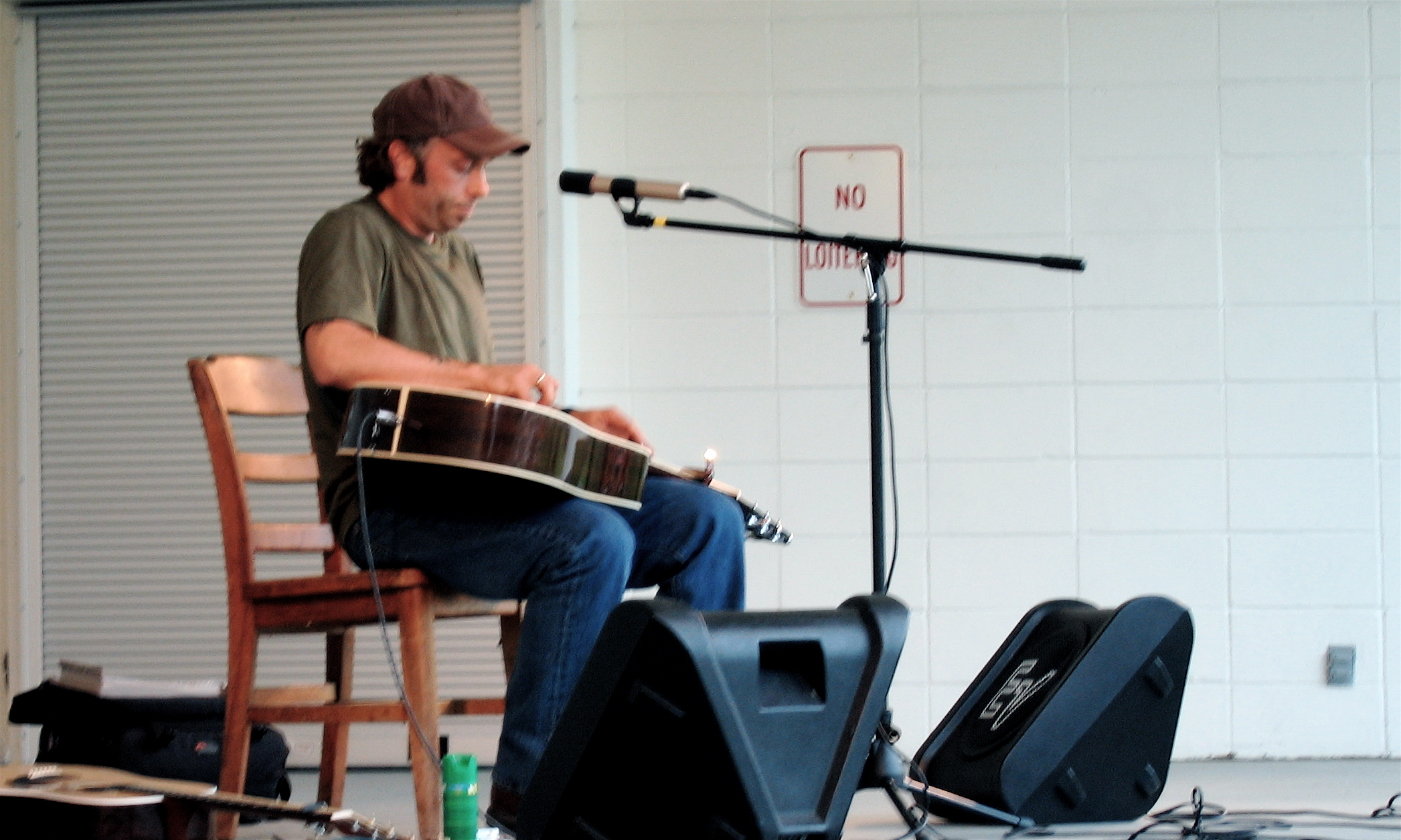

Background information
- Born: October 5, 1959; Sumner, Washington, U.S.
- Died: May 31, 2022 (aged 62) Iowa, U.S.
- Genres: Blues, folk, Americana, gospel
- Occupations: Musician, singer, songwriter
- Instruments: Acoustic guitar, slide guitar
- Labels: Burnside, Rykodisc, Rounder, Black Hen
- Website: www.kellyjoephelps.net

Kelly Joe Phelps (October 5, 1959 – May 31, 2022) was an American musician and songwriter. His music has been characterized as a mixture of delta blues and jazz.

== Career ==
Kelly Joe Phelps grew up in Sumner, Washington, a blue-collar farming town. He learned country and folk songs, as well as drums and piano, from his father. He began playing guitar at age twelve.

Phelps concentrated on free jazz and took his cues from musicians like Ornette Coleman, Miles Davis, and John Coltrane. He spent 10 years playing jazz, mostly as a bass player. He refers to his "conversion" to a blues musician when he began listening to acoustic blues masters like Mississippi Fred McDowell and Robert Pete Williams. He initially gained notice for his solo lapstyle slide guitar, which he played by laying the instrument flat and fretting it with a heavy steel bar. Inspired by the birth of his daughter Rachel in 1990, Phelps began writing songs. He began singing and released his critically praised debut, Lead Me On, in 1995.

In 2005, Phelps released a live album, Tap the Red Cane Whirlwind, which he followed a year later with the studio album Tunesmith Retrofit. In 2009, he released an album of instrumentals titled Western Bell. Following that release, he began recording and touring with the American singer-songwriter Corinne West. In January 2013, he announced a hiatus from touring due to ulnar neuropathy in his right hand and arm.

Phelps is featured in the 2011 book I'll Be Here in the Morning: The Songwriting Legacy of Townes Van Zandt. In 2017, he was profiled in the UK music blog the Immortal Jukebox.

Phelps died in Iowa on May 31, 2022.

== Influence ==
Devonian folk duo Show of Hands recorded a cover of Phelps' "Tommy" for their album Country Life (2003), with a new arrangement by singer Steve Knightley. Singer and guitarist Danny Jones of the band McFly has cited Phelps as an influence. The outro of McFly's "Don't Know Why", from Wonderland (2005), was inspired by Phelps, and Jones has cited Roll Away the Stone as one of his 'desert island' CDs, as well as his favourite obscure album. Speaking to The Guardian, Jones described Phelps as "the most talented guitar player I've ever seen."

== Discography ==
- Lead Me On, (Burnside, 1994)
- Roll Away the Stone, (Rykodisc, 1997)
- Shine Eyed Mister Zen, (Rykodisc, 1999)
- Sky Like a Broken Clock, (Rykodisc, 2001)
- Beggar's Oil (Rykodisc, 2002)
- Slingshot Professionals, (Rykodisc, 2003)
- Tap the Red Cane Whirlwind, (Rykodisc/True North, 2005)
- Tunesmith Retrofit, 2006 (Rounder, 2005)
- Western Bell, (Black Hen, 2009)
- Magnetic Skyline with Corinne West (Make, 2010)
- Brother Sinner and the Whale, (Black Hen, 2012)
- Roll Away the Blues: The Very Best of, (Nascente, 2013)

=== With others ===
- Various Artists: Hear the Angels Sing: Greetings from Rykodisc (Rykodisc)
- Paul Curreri: Songs for Devon Sproule (City Salvage)
- Zubot and Dawson: Chicken Scratch (True North)
- Jay Farrar: Sebastopol (Artemis)
- Rory Block: I'm Every Woman (Rounder)
- Linda Tillery and the Cultural Heritage Choir: Say Yo' Business (Earthbeat)
- Tim O'Brien: The Crossing (Alula)
- Greg Brown: Slant 6 Mind (Red House)
- Greg Brown: Further In (Red House)
- Tony Furtado: Roll My Blues Away (Rounder)
- Tony Furtado Band (Cojema Music)
- Martin Simpson: Cool & Unusual (Red House)
- Louise Taylor: Ride (Signature)
- Bo Ramsey: In the Weeds (Trailer)
- Townes Van Zandt: The Highway Kind (Normal)

== See also ==
- List of contemporary blues musicians
- List of blues musicians
- List of singer-songwriters
