= Vancouver Folk Music Festival =

Canadian music festival

Coordinates: 49.272°N 123.192°W

- Genre: folk, world, singer-songwriter, bluegrass, hip hop
- Dates: third weekend of July
- Locations: Jericho Beach, Vancouver, BC, Canada
- Years active: 1978–present
- Website: thefestival.bc.ca

The Vancouver Folk Music Festival (VFMF), founded in 1978, is an outdoor multistage music festival, located at Jericho Beach Park on the west side of Vancouver, British Columbia. It takes place annually on the third weekend of July, drawing over 30,000 attendees each year.

The festival has attracted artists from across the world, including Adam Cohen, Ani Difranco, Utah Phillips, Pete Seeger, Tuvan throat singers, Sarah Harmer, Veda Hille, Feist, K'naan, and Ferron, among many others.

== History ==
The Vancouver Folk Music Festival was founded in 1978 by Mitch Podolak and Colin Gorrie, who also helped establish the Winnipeg Folk Festival; Ernie Fladell and Frances “Frannie” Fitzgibbon, employees at the City of Vancouver's social planning department; and Gary Cristall, who coordinated the event. The inaugural festival took place from August 11 through 13, 1978 in Stanley Park, and an estimated 10,000 people were in attendance. Performers included Mary McCaslin and Jim Ringer, Odetta, Stan Rogers. Leon Redbone, Leon Bibb, and John Hammond.

In 1979, the event was changed to take place the third weekend of July at Jericho Beach. Late in the year, the Vancouver Folk Music Festival Society was established as a non-profit organization and given control of future versions of the festival. In early years, the organization operated a dedicated record label called Festival Records.

== Previous Lineups ==
=== 2023 Lineup ===
The 46th annual festival was held July 14–16, 2023.

- American Beauties
- Jill Barber
- Blick Bassy
- Tré Burt
- Jim Byrnes
- Las Cafeteras
- Calexico
- Celeigh Cardinal
- Joachim Cooder
- Steve Dawson and the Hooded Mergansers
- Maya de Vitry
- Krystle dos Santos
- Ferron
- Derek Gripper
- Joe Henry
- The High Bar Gang
- Rich Hope
- Melón Jiménez & Lara Wong
- Kalàscima feat. Andrea Ramolo
- Kayhan Kalhor Trio
- Amythyst Kiah
- Albert Lee
- Don McGlashan w/ Anita Clark
- Ruth Moody
- Namgar
- Aoife O'Donovan
- Susan O'Neill
- Samantha Parton
- Jocelyn Pettit & Ellen Gire
- William Prince
- Cláudio Rabeca Quartet w/ Serena Eades
- Rum Ragged
- San Pedro Cinco
- Ruby Singh and The Future Ancestors
- The Sojourners
- Tiny Habits
- True Loves
- Twin Flames
- Cedric Watson & Jourdan Thibodeaux

=== 2019 Lineup ===
The 42nd annual festival was held July 19–21, 2019.

- Aerialists
- Black String
- Danny Boudreau Band
- Basia Bulat
- Matthew Byrne
- Celeigh Cardinal
- Andrew Collins Trio
- Copperhead
- The Dardanelles
- Steve Dawson
- Desirée Dawson Trio
- Brother Tito Deler
- Dwayne Dopsie & The Zydeco Hellraisers
- Bobby Dove
- Ramblin' Jack Elliott
- Mike Farris & The Fortunate Few
- Luca Fogale
- Front Country
- Amos Garrett & Julian Kerr
- Raine Hamilton String Trio
- The Hamiltones
- David Hidalgo
- Zaki Ibrahim
- Illiteratty
- Kirchen, Cox and McRae
- Kitty And The Rooster
- La Mexcalina
- Joey Landreth
- Larkin Poe
- Le Vent du Nord
- George Leach Band
- Locarno
- Lonesome Ace Stringband
- Los Pachamama y Flor Amargo
- Corb Lund
- Don McGlashan
- Pablo Mendéndez & Mezcla
- Midnight Shine
- Irish Mythen
- Namgar
- Oktopus
- Marin Patenaude
- The Rad Trads
- Rebirth Brass Band
- John Reishman And The Jaybirds
- Riit
- Sam Roberts Band
- Pharis and Jason Romero
- Lucy Rose
- Rosie & the Riveters
- Ruby & Smith
- Sarah Shook & the Disarmers
- Vivek Shraya/Too Attached
- Son of James
- Nano Stern Trio
- Tal National
- Emily Triggs
- Tsatsu Stalqayu
- Sunny War

=== 2018 Lineup ===
The 41st annual festival was held July 13–16, 2018.

- Art Bergmann
- Wallis Bird
- Mariel Buckley
- Steph Cameron
- Neko Case
- Ry Cooder feat. the Hamilton's
- Joachim Cooder
- Rodney Crowell
- Alex Cuba
- DakhaBrakha
- Dálava
- Darlingside
- Guy Davis
- The Dead South
- Las Estrellas de Vancouver
- Mick Flannery
- Dori Freeman
- Gamelan Bike Bike
- Ilaria Graziano e Francesco Forni
- Gordon Grdina's Haram
- Jimmy "Duck" Holmes
- Iskwé
- Kacy & Clayton
- Martin Kerr
- Ezra Kwizera
- Grant Lawrence and Friends
- Little Miss Higgins
- John Lowell Band
- A Familia Machado
- James McMurtry
- Mike Munson
- Murfitt and Main
- Dawn Pemberton
- Petunia and the Vipers
- Carole Pope
- Les Poules a Colin
- Professor Banjo & Estro Jennies
- Quantum Tangle
- Ranky Tanky
- Steve Riley & Mamou Playboys
- Archie Roach
- Small Glories
- Son de Madera
- Jayme Stone's Folklife
- Leonard Sumner
- Three Women and the Truth
- Viper Central
- Skye Wallace
- Wazimbo and Banda Kakana
- Donovan Woods

=== 2017 Lineup ===
The 40th annual festival was held July 13–16, 2017.

- C.R. Avery
- Bahamas
- Barenaked Ladies
- Blick Bassy
- Begonia
- The Belle Game
- Blind Pilot
- Bob Bossin
- Billy Bragg & Joe Henry
- Jim Bryson
- Jim Byrnes
- Choir! Choir! Choir!
- Chouk Bwa Libète
- Cold Specks
- Shawn Colvin
- Delgres
- Cris Derksen
- Alpha Yaya Diallo
- Kathleen Edwards
- Ellika Solo Rafael
- Ramy Essam
- Ferron & her All Star Band
- Roy Forbes
- The Funk Hunters
- Rhiannon Giddens
- Ganga Giri
- Noah Gundersen
- Hillsburn
- Matt Holubowski
- ILAM
- Emmanuel Jal
- Eilen Jewell
- Jonah Blacksmith
- Si Kahn
- Korrontzi
- Jim Kweskin & Meredith Axelrod
- The Mae Trio
- Mbongwana Star
- Paul McKenna
- Mélisande
- Tift Merritt
- Katie Moore and Andrew Horton
- Jake Morley
- Native North America: A Gathering of Indigenous Trailblazers
- Nive Nielsen & The Deer Children
- Aoife O'Donovan & Noam Pikelny
- Grace Petrie
- Leonard Podolak
- The Revivalists
- Archie Roach
- Nell Robinson & Jim Nunally Band
- RURA
- Clinton & Lorna St. John
- John K. Samson & The Winter Wheat
- La Santa Cecilia
- Andy Shauf
- Nick Sherman
- Gabrielle Shonk
- Sidestepper
- The Slocan Ramblers
- The Sojourners
- Tomato Tomato
- True Blues feat. Corey Harris & Alvin Youngblood Hart
- Will Varley
- Leif Vollebekk
- Luke Wallace
- Wesli

=== 2016 Lineup ===
The 39th annual festival was held July 15–17, 2016.

- Jojo Abot
- Ajinai
- Elida Almeida
- The Americans
- Faris Amine
- Geoff Berner
- The Bills
- Birds of Chicago
- Hayes Carll
- Martin and Eliza Carthy
- Bruce Cockburn
- The Crooked Brothers
- Élage Diouf
- Mike Edel
- Emilie and Ogden
- Lee Fields and the Expressions
- Dominique Fricot
- Martin Harley
- The Harpoonist & the Axe Murderer
- Les Hay Babies
- Jolie Holland and Samantha Parton
- I Draw Slow
- Hubby Jenkins
- Kaumakaiwa Kanaka‘ole with Shawn Pimental
- Shane Koyczan and The Short Story Long
- Lakou Mizik
- Land of Talk
- Lisa LeBlanc
- Leftover Salmon
- Terra Lightfoot
- Little Scream
- Lord Huron
- Betsayda Machado y La Parranda el Clavo
- Mandolin Orange
- Mexican Institute of Sound
- Moulettes
- Nahko and Medicine for People
- Flávia Nascimento
- The New Pornographers
- Les Noces Gitanes
- Cian Nugent
- Lisa O'Neill
- Oh Pep!
- Oysterband
- Chris Pureka
- The Ragpicker String Band
- Karim Saada
- San Fermin
- Sarah Jane Scouten
- Ten Strings and a Goat Skin
- Trad.Attack!
- Twin Bandit
- Henry Wagons
- The Wainwright Sisters
- M. Ward
- Lucy Ward
- The Weather Station
- Yemen Blues with Ravid Kahalani
- The Young’uns

=== 2015 Lineup ===
The 38th annual festival was held July 17–19, 2015.

- 100 Mile House
- Ross Ainslie and Jarlath Henderson
- Annie Lou
- Matthew Barber and Jill Barber
- Beans on Toast
- Lurrie Bell
- Blind Pilot
- Breabach
- Basia Bulat
- Bustamento
- Sousou and Maher Cissoko
- Adam Cohen
- Diyet
- Cécile Doo-Kingué
- The Down Hill Strugglers
- Frazey Ford
- Fortunate Ones
- La Gallera Social Club
- Mary Gauthier
- Jenn Grant
- Ash Grunwald
- I'm With Her
- The Jerry Cans
- Angélique Kidjo
- Bassekou Kouyaté & Ngoni Ba
- Pokey LaFarge
- Sam Lee (folk musician) and Friends
- The Lowest Pair
- Lucius
- Bongeziwe Mabandla
- Mama Kin
- Matuto
- Rory McLeod
- Melbourne Ska Orchestra
- Old Man Luedecke
- The Once
- Lindi Ortega
- Parsonsfield
- Perch Creek
- Grace Petrie
- Phosphorescent
- Les Poules à Colin
- Rising Appalachia
- The Sadies
- Said the Whale
- Scarlett Jane
- Shtreiml & Ismail Fencioglu
- Son Little
- Söndörgö
- The Strumbellas
- Tanga
- Richard Thompson
- Trampled By Turtles
- Ivan Tucakov and Tambura Rasa
- The Wilderness of Manitoba
- Marlon Williams
- Hawksley Workman
- Jasper Sloan Yip

=== 2014 Lineup ===
The 37th annual festival was held July 18–20, 2014.

- Banda Kakana
- Andrew Bird and the Hands of Glory
- Born Ruffians
- Brasstronaut
- David Bridie
- The Carper Family
- The Como Mamas
- Rose Cousins
- The Casey Driessen Singularity
- Dulsori
- Quique Escamilla
- Alejandro Escovedo and the Sensitive Boys
- Fish and Bird
- Flying Mountain
- Ashleigh Flynn & the Back Porch Majority
- Beppe Gambetta
- Geoumungo Factory
- Eliza Gilkyson
- Great Lake Swimmers
- Grievous Angels
- James Hill
- The Honeycutters
- The Howlin' Brothers
- Tamar Ilana & Ventanas
- Iskwew Singers
- Stephen Kellogg
- Roger Knox
- Seun Kuti and Egypt 80
- Mary Lambert
- Jon Langford and Jean Cook
- Amos Lee
- Lemon Bucket Orkestra
- Lost Bayou Ramblers
- Jay Malinowski & The Deadcoast
- La Manta
- Samantha Martin & Delta Sugar
- Tift Merritt
- Mokoomba
- Leo Moran and Anthony Thistlethwaite
- The Nautical Miles
- Oh My Darling
- Ozomatli
- Pacifika
- Karine Polwart
- Alejandra Ribera
- Jenny Ritter
- David Rovics
- Noura Mint Seymali
- Langhorne Slim & the Law
- Leonard Sumner
- Oliver Swain's Big Machine
- Riccardo Tesi & Banditaliana
- Les Tireux D'Roches
- Typhoon
- Foy Vance
- Suzie Vinnick
- Wagons
- Leo "Bud" Welch
- Josh White Jr.
- Wintersleep
- Frank Yamma

=== 2013 Lineup ===
The 36th annual festival was held July 19–21, 2013.

- Lena Anderssen
- Sam Baker
- Del Barber
- Black Prairie
- Bon Debarras
- Dalannah Gail Bowen
- Briga
- The Brothers Comatose
- Jeffery Broussard & the Creole Cowboys
- Brown Bird
- Jason Burnstick
- The Cat Empire
- Tim Chaisson
- Cold Specks
- Debo Band
- Delhi 2 Dublin
- DeVotchKa
- Joaquin Diaz
- The Raghu Dixit Project
- Maria Dunn
- Kathleen Edwards
- Steve Earle & The Dukes
- Elephant Revival
- Hannah Georgas
- Sarah Lee Guthrie and Johnny Irion
- Habadekuk
- Hanggai
- Hayden
- Hazmat Modine
- Hurray for the Riff Raff
- Reid Jamieson
- Anthony Joseph and the Spasm Band
- The Alan Kelly Gang
- Mo Kenney
- Kaki King
- Aidan Knight
- Kobo Town
- The Latchikós
- The Littlest Birds
- Mamselle
- Natalie Maines
- Maria in the Shower
- Danny Michel
- Nomadic Massive
- Jerron "Blind Bow" Paxton
- Phildel
- Martha Redbone Roots Project
- Pharis and Jason Romero
- Justin Rutledge
- Stefano Saletti and Piccola Banda Ikona
- The Shirleys
- Sierra Leone's Refugee All Stars
- moira smiley & VOCO
- Kinnie Starr
- Jayme Stone
- Stringband
- Vancouver Chinese Music Ensemble
- Tinpan Orange
- Los Vega
- The Waterboys
- Loudon Wainwright III
- Sara Watkins
- Whitehorse
- The Wooden Sky
- Fatma Zidan
- Laetitia Zonzambé

=== 2012 Lineup ===
The 35th annual festival was held July 13–15, 2012.

- The Atomic Duo
- The Barr Brothers
- Geoff Berner
- Mark Berube
- Besh o droM
- Bette and Wallet
- Blitz the Ambassador
- Bombolessé
- Bryan Bowers
- Canailles
- The Cave Singers
- Chatham County Line
- The Johnny Clegg Band
- Amelia Curran
- Dala
- Kat Danser
- Ani DiFranco
- Colleen Eccleston
- Ramblin' Jack Elliott
- e.s.l.
- David Essig
- Mike Farris & the Cumberland Saints
- Fearing & White
- Roy Forbes
- Jaron Freeman Fox and the Opposite of Everything
- Tret Fure
- Los Gaiteros de San Jacinto
- Leela Gilday
- Good for Grapes
- The Head and the Heart
- Hey Rosetta!
- Veda Hille
- H'Sao
- Jaffa Road
- Martyn Joseph
- K'naan
- Murray McLauchlan
- Dan Mangan
- Marley's Ghost
- Emel Mathlouthi
- Minor Empire
- Mrigya
- Holly Near
- The Once
- evalyn parry
- Pied Pumkin
- Possessed by Paul James
- River City Extension
- Alejandra Robles
- Serena Ryder
- Shakura S'Aida
- Silk Road Music
- Sidi Touré
- Wake Owl
- Cedric Watson et Bijou Créole
- Wazimbo
- Ken Whiteley and the Levy Sisters
- Lucinda Williams
- The Wood Brothers
- Royal Wood

=== 2011 Lineup ===
The 34th annual festival was held July 15–17, 2011.

- Freshlyground
- Justin Townes Earle
- Gillian Welch
- James Cotton Superharp
- Tim Robbins and the Rouges Gallery Band
- Ti-Coca and Wanga Neges
- Rosanne Cash
- The Jayhawks
- La-33
- Josh Ritter and the Royal City Band
- Tinariwen
- Emmanuel Jal
- Beats Antique
- The Duhks
- Buck 65
- Jim Bryson and The Weakerthans
- C.R. Avery
- Pokey LaFarge and the South City Three
- Elliott BROOD
- Kathryn Calder
- The Burning Hell
- David Wax Museum

=== 2010 Lineup ===
The 33rd annual festival was held July 16–18, 2010. Artists included:

- Gadelle
- Shane Koyczan and the Short Story Long
- The Avett Brothers
- Calexico
- Sarah Harmer
- Naomi Shelton and the Gospel Queens
- Brett Dennen
- Natacha Atlas
- Ricky Skaggs and Kentucky Thunder

=== 2009 Lineup ===
The 32nd annual festival was held on July 17–19, 2009.

- Los De Abajo
- Justin Adams and Juldeh Camara
- Matt Anderson
- Darol Anger, Mike Marshall with Vasen
- Arrested Development
- Bellowhead
- Geoff Berner
- Mark Berube and the Patriotic Few
- The Blue Voodoo
- Bop Ensemble
- The Breakmen
- Basia Bulat
- CaneFire
- Eliana Cuevas
- The Ebony Hillbillies
- Tony McManus
- Jorge Miguel Flamenco
- Los Misioneros del Norte
- Mr. Something Something
- Matabaruka
- Idy Oulo
- Jonathan Edwards
- Joel Fafard
- Roy Forbes
- Fito Garcia Afro-Cuban Bass Ensemble
- Amos Garrett Acoustic Trio with Doug Cox
- Doug Cox
- Liza Garza
- Dick Gaughan
- Great Lake Swimmers
- HAPA
- Corey Harris
- Veda Hille
- Iron and Wine
- James Keelaghan
- Labess
- Patty Larkin
- Anne Loree
- Dan Mangan
- Pacifika
- Steven Page
- The Paperboys
- The Proclaimers
- Joe Pug
- Lester Quitzau
- Kate Reid
- Sara Renelik
- The Reverend Peyton's Big Damn Band
- Rock Plaza Central
- Zal Idrissa Sissokho and Buntalo
- Mavis Staples
- Tarhana
- Shari Ulrich
- Umalali
- Suzie Vinnick and Rick Fines
- Vishten
- VOC Soul Gospel Choir
- The Weakerthans
- Cheryl Wheeler
- Women in Docs
- Jamyang Yeshi
- d'bi. young

=== 2008 Lineup ===
The 31st annual festival was held from July 18–20, 2008. Artists included:

- Michael Franti & Spearhead
- Master Musicians of Jajouka
- Ozomatli
- Aimee Mann
- Kiran Ahluwalia
- Etran Finatawa
- Markus James and the Wassonrai and Eneida Marta.

=== 2007 Lineup ===
The 30th annual festival was held from July 13–15, 2007.

- Rani Arbo and Daisy Mayhem
- The Be Good Tanyas
- Geoff Berner
- Bitch and the Exciting Conclusion
- Jim Byrnes, Steve Dawson and The Soujourners with the House Band
- Carolina Chocolate Drops
- Liz Carroll & John Doyle
- Cornerstone
- Toumani Diabate's Symmetric Orchestra
- Kellylee Evans
- The Fugitives
- Mike Ford
- David Francey
- Ganga Giri
- Hip Hop Hope
- Jamaica to Toronto
- Jam Camp
- Martyn Joseph
- Andrea Koziol
- Kutapira
- The Life and Times of Ginger Goodwin
- Los Munequitos de Matanzas
- Dougie MacLean
- Mihirangi
- Sarah Jane Morris
- Geoff Muldaur
- Mushfiq Ensemble
- Next...The Collaboratory
- Nucleus
- Oh Susanna
- Old Man Luedecke
- Ndidi Onukwulu
- Utah Phillips
- Po' Girl
- Salt
- Karen Savoca
- Adham Shaikh's Dreamtree Project
- Adrian Sherwood
- Songs of the Pacific Northwest
- Tanya Tagaq
- Tapia eta Leturia
- 30 Years in 60 Minutes with Timothy Wisdom
- The Truckers Memorial
- Twilight Circus Dub Sound System
- Under the Volcano – Rhyme and Resist!
- Vancouver International Bhangra Celebration
- The Wailin' Jennys
- Hawksley Workman
- You Are Here (with Rae Spoon)

=== 2006 Lineup ===
The 29th annual VFMF was held from July 14–16, 2006.

- A Bhangra Celebration
- Afrodizz
- Angela Harris
- Beats Without Borders
- Bethany and Rufus
- Big Bass Theory
- Clifton Joseph
- Collaboratory 2.9
- Dan Bern
- Dubblestandart
- Dyad
- Eliza Gilkyson
- Erynn Marshall and Chris Coole
- Feist
- Ga Gi
- Ganga Giri
- Hamell on Trial
- Ivan Coyote and The Word on The Beach
- Jacob Cino and Third Eye Tribe
- James Keelaghan
- Jane Siberry
- Kelly Joe Phelps
- Lal
- Leaky Heaven Circus presents Giant Consortium
- Lillian Allen
- Linda Tillery and Nina Gerber
- Mihirangi
- Najma Akhtar
- Ndidi Onukwulu featuring Madagascar Slim
- no luck club
- Nucleus
- Ray Wylie Hubbard
- Ridley Bent
- Ruthie Foster
- Salt
- Sisters Euclid
- Supergenerous
- Tanya Tagaq
- The Angel Brothers feat. Sandhya Sanjana
- The Grande Mothers
- The Mammals
- The Mighty Popo with Urunana rw'abadatana
- The New Lost City Ramblers
- Tim Readman & Shona Le Mottée
- Utah Phillips
- Vishwa Mohan Bhatt & Salil Bhatt
- Zar

=== 1978 Lineup ===
The 1st annual festival was held August 11–13, 1978.

- David Amram
- Alistair Anderson
- Edmond and Quentin Badoux
- Jon Bartlett & Rika Ruebsaat
- Peter Bellamy
- Leon Bibb
- Ken Bloom
- Roy Bookbinder
- Bryan Bowers
- John Allan Cameron
- Diane Campbell
- Margaret Christl
- Bruce Cockburn
- Andy Cohen
- Don Cullen
- David Essig
- Mimi Fariña
- Frank Ferrel & Bertram Levy
- Cathy Fink & Duck Donald
- Flying Mountain
- Paddy Graber
- Amos Garrett & Geoff Muldaur
- Al Grierson
- Wendy Grossman
- Peter Gzowski
- Bob Hadley
- Barry Hall
- John Hammond
- Larry Hanks
- Tommy Hawkins
- Heartland
- John Hiatt
- Lou Killen
- Vera Johnson
- Tam Kearney and Jim Strickland
- Tex Konig
- Alain Lamontagne
- Mountain Dance Theatre
- Debby McClatchy
- Mary McCaslin
- Robbie McNeill
- Dale Miller
- Rick Neufeld
- No Comhaile
- Odetta
- Original Sloth Band
- Robert Paquette
- Colleen Peterson
- Faith Petric
- U. Utah Philips
- Pied Pear
- Red Clay Ramblers
- Leon Redbone
- J. Rider Riley
- Jim Ringer
- Gamble Rogers
- Stan Rogers
- Bob Ruzicka
- Claudia Schmidt
- Len Udow
- Rosalie Sorrels
- Mike Seeger & Alice Gerrard
- Roosevelt Sykes
- Phil Thomas
- Jay & Lyn Ungar
- Jud Strunk
- Tam Lin
- Graham Townsend
- Valdy
- Peter Paul Van Camp
- Rick Van Krugel
- Josh White Jr.
- David Wiffen
- Kate Wolf
- Winston Wuttunee
- Robin Williamson & His Merry Band
- Western Broom and Wooden Ware
