= Fraser Union =

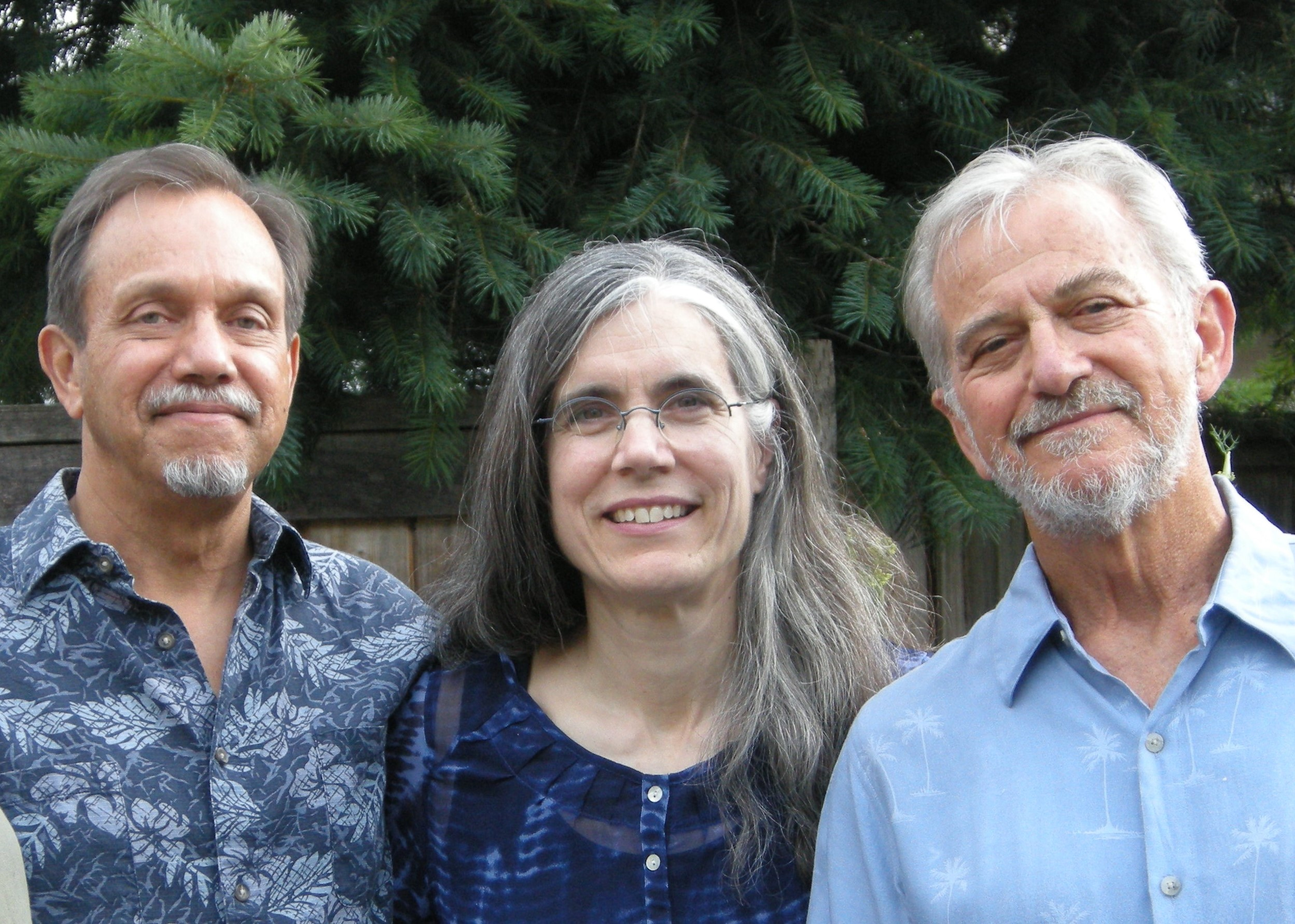
Fraser Union 2022: Barry Truter, Kathy Griffin, and Roger Holdstock

Fraser Union is a Vancouver-based Canadian folk music group, formed in 1983. CBC Radio helped bring early national attention to them on the Max Ferguson Show. For four decades their music has most often told stories of Canadian working people. Their focus on labour and progressive issues drew them into collaboration with Tom Wayman, Kate Braid and the Vancouver Industrial Writers' Union. Together they produced Split/Shift: songs and poems of the workplace. Fraser Union's festival performances include the 2007 Vancouver Folk Music Festival, where they presented a stage titled "Songs of the Pacific Northwest" dedicated to the work of British Columbia folk song collector Philip J. Thomas. In 2008, they returned to the Vancouver Folk Music Festival to do the same for the legendary Utah Phillips. They have also performed at Vancouver Island MusicFest, ArtsWells, Filberg Festival, and the Princeton Traditional Music Festival, among others throughout British Columbia. In addition to festivals, they perform regularly in folk clubs, and in concerts to benefit social causes.

Their group name derives from the intersecting references to the Fraser River, Simon Fraser University, Fraser Street, etc., all significant to the band's location in Vancouver. By the time of their first, self-titled, recording in 1988 they were a male quartet: Roger Holdstock, Henk Piket, Dan Kenning, and Barry Truter, all of whom met through and were presidents of the Vancouver Folk Song Society. From 1987 until 2008, the quartet remained the same until Dan Kenning retired, leaving the trio to carry on until 2018 when they were joined by Kathy Griffin. At the dawn of 2023, Fraser Union is once again a trio, Barry Truter, Kathy Griffin, and Roger Holdstock, as they prepare to release a new EP.

== Discography ==
- 1988 Fraser Union
- 1989 Split Shift
- 1991/2003 Hello, Stranger
- 2000 From There to Here
- 2006 This Old World
- 2009 B.C. Songbook
- 2023 Bridging the Gap (ep)
