= Interstellar Rodeo =

Former annual music event

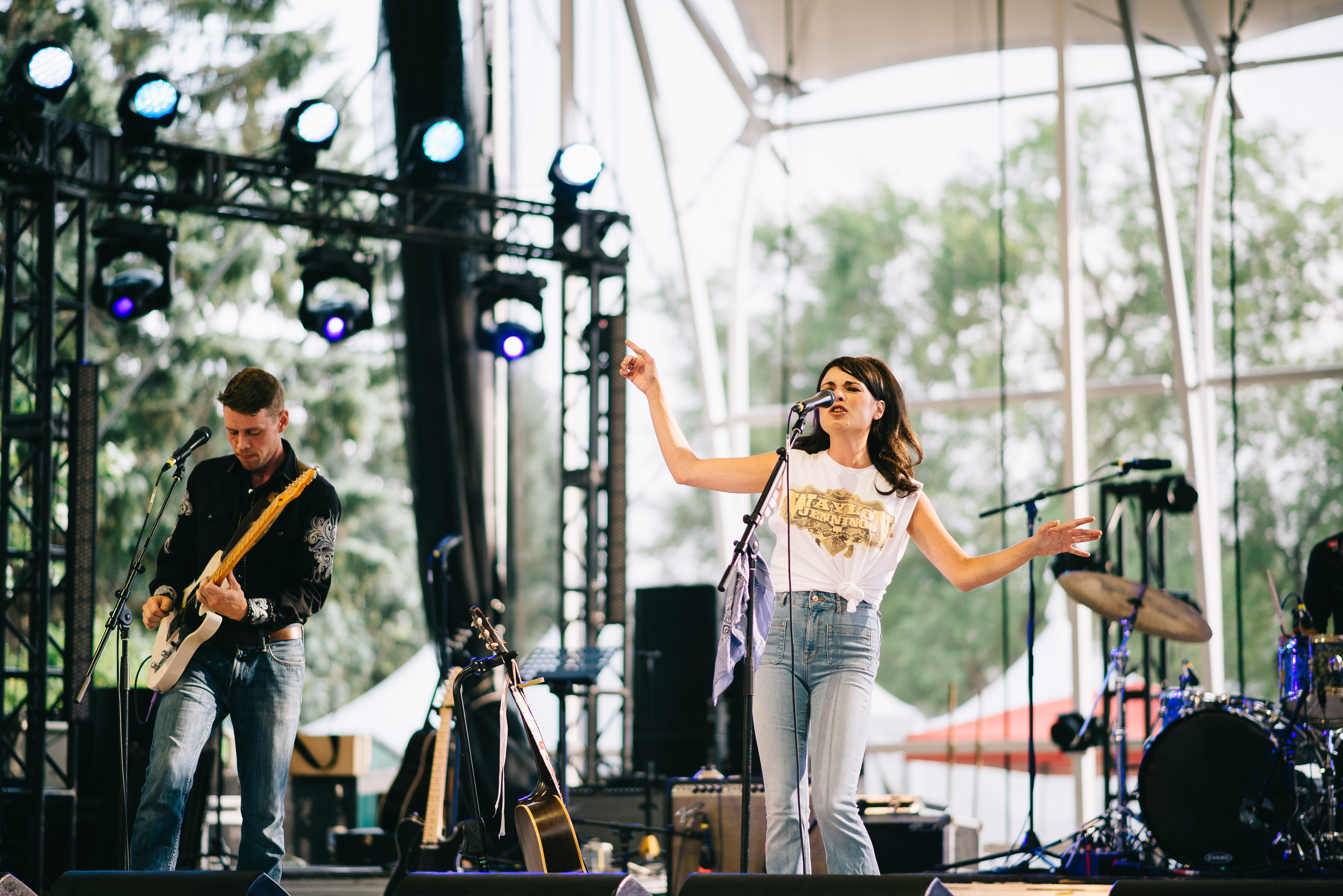
- Whitney Rose performing at Interstellar Rodeo 2017 in Edmonton
- Genre: Folk and rock music
- Locations: Heritage Amphitheatre, Hawrelak Park, Edmonton, Alberta, Canada; 53.527°N 113.547°W
- Years active: 2012 – 2019
- Founders: Shauna de Cartier of Six Shooter Records
- Website: interstellarrodeo.com

Interstellar Rodeo was an annual three-day outdoor music event held the last weekend of July in Edmonton, Alberta, Canada, established in 2012 and held at the Heritage Amphitheatre within Hawrelak Park. From 2015 to 2017, Six Shooter Records also had an Interstellar Rodeo in Winnipeg, Manitoba. The final Edmonton Interstellar Rodeo was in 2019.

The festival showcased performers from numerous genres. Performers included Blue Rodeo, Randy Newman and Hawksley Workman in 2012, and Alabama Shakes, Steve Earle and the Dukes, Sarah Harmer, Serena Ryder and Shout Out Out Out Out in 2013.

== History ==
Interstellar Rodeo was established in 2012 by Shauna de Cartier of Six Shooter Records. The event took place annually during the last weekend of July at the Heritage Amphitheatre at Hawrelak Park in the North Saskatchewan River Valley. The amphitheatre features covered seating with uncovered grassed areas beyond. Interstellar Rodeo featured artist-wine pairings.

In 2019, festival passes cost between 149 and 279 dollars.

In 2014, Interstellar Rodeo was shut down for one day due to poor weather. The 2019 Festival was shut down for approximately one hour on July 27 due to severe thunderstorms in eastern Alberta. In late 2019, de Cartier announced the festival would be going on hiatus and not returning for summer 2020.

== Interstellar Rodeo Winnipeg ==
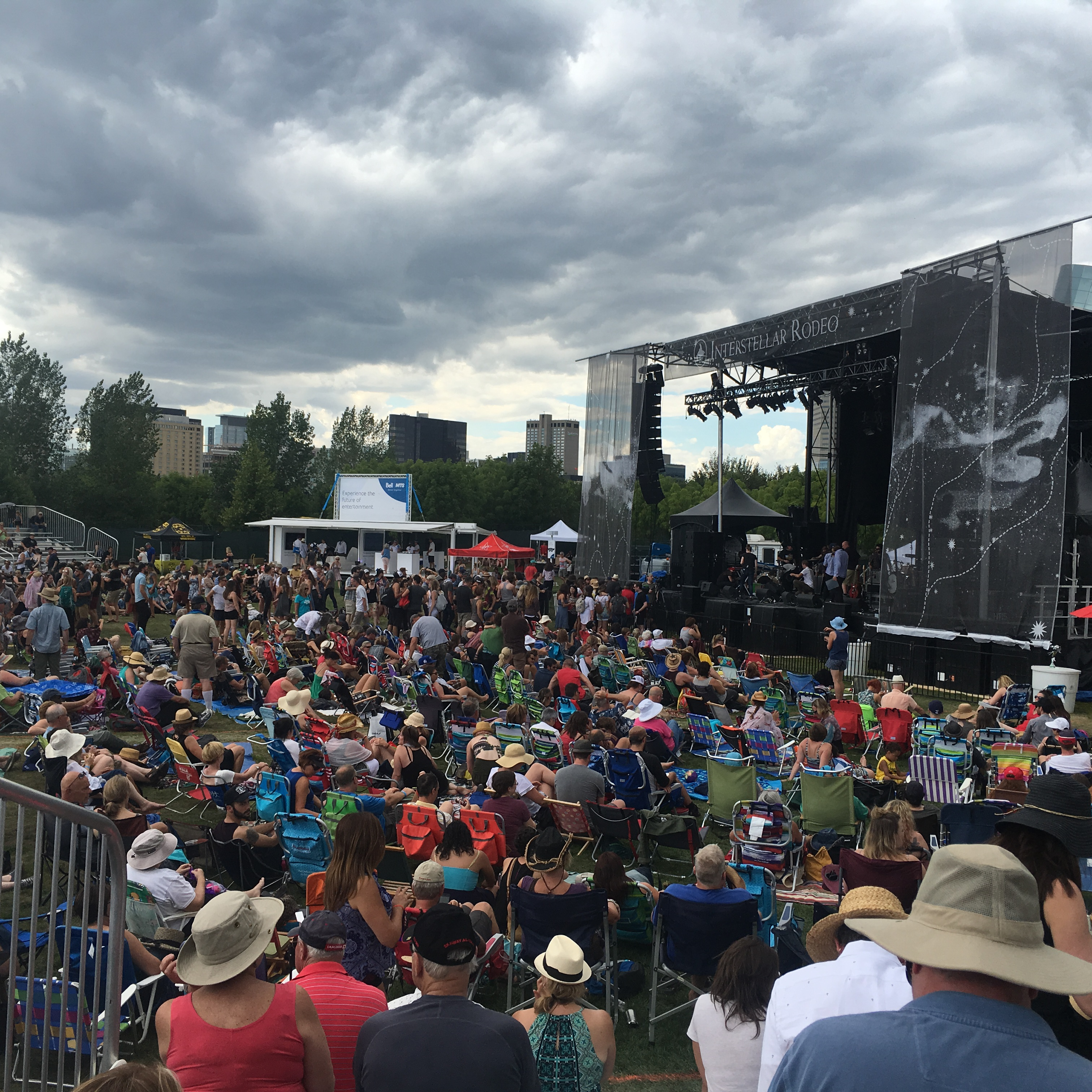
2016 Interstellar Rodeo at The Forks

From 2015 to 2017, Interstellar Rodeo expanded to Winnipeg, Manitoba. The Winnipeg festival took place at The Forks in mid-August. The festival line-up typically featured some overlap with the Edmonton festival but with the addition of Manitoba-based artists such as Leonard Sumner. The festival dropped out of Winnipeg due to financial concerns from competing with free concert series in Winnipeg such as the Canada Summer Games concerts in 2017.

=== Performers ===
2015

- Sinéad O'Connor
- Dwight Yoakam
- Blue Rodeo
- Vance Joy
- Steve Earle and The Dukes
- Sharon Jones and The Dap-Kings
- July Talk
- Hawksley Workman
- Tanya Tagaq
- Justin Townes Earle
- Rhiannon Giddens
- The Lone Bellow
- Black Joe Lewis
- Elliott Brood
- NQ Arbuckle
- Amelia Curran
- Jason Plumb & The Willing

2016

- Blond(e) Goth
- The Strumbellas
- Nathaniel Rateliff & The Night Sweats
- NQ Arbuckle
- Serena Ryder
- The Wet Secrets
- Thao & The Get Down Stay Down
- Leonard Sumner
- Skydiggers
- Fantastic Negrito
- Sykamore
- Margo Price
- Joe Nolan
- Wilco
- Henry Wagons
- Sam Outlaw
- Begonia
- Wintersleep
- Lee Fields & The Expressions
- Henri Herbert
- Whitehorse
- Del Barber
- Case/Lang/Veirs

2017

- Aloe Blacc
- Sarah Slean
- Danny Michel
- The Dead South
- Yola Carter
- Shakey Graves
- Beck
- Broken Social Scene
- Father John Misty

== List of artists ==
2012 (July 27–29)

- The Beauties
- Alejandro Escovedo and The Sensitive Boys^{1}
- Blue Rodeo
- Richard Buckner
- Cadence Weapon
- Carolina Chocolate Drops
- Jenn Grant
- Randy Newman
- Michael Rault Band
- Jason Plumb and The Willing
- Shakura S'Aida
- The Sojourners
- Wagons
- Gillian Welch^{1}
- Whitehorse (featuring Melissa McClelland and Luke Doucet)
- Hawksley Workman

^{1}Sinéad O'Connor, originally booked, was unable to perform due to illness and was replaced by Alejandro Escovedo and The Sensitive Boys and Gillian Welch.

2013 (July 26–28)

- Alabama Shakes
- C.R. Avery
- Del Barber
- Amelia Curran
- The Deep Dark Woods
- Steve Earle and The Dukes
- Elliott Brood
- John Fullbright
- The Good Lovelies
- Sarah Harmer
- Interstellar All-Stars, featuring Jim Cuddy, Danny Michel and Quique Escamilla
- Jr. Gone Wild
- Danny Michel with The Garifuna Collective
- Mike Plume
- Serena Ryder
- Rachel Sermanni
- Shout Out Out Out Out
- Skydiggers
- Kurt Vile
- M. Ward
- Chris Wynters and Scott Peters

== See also ==
- List of festivals in Edmonton
- List of festivals in Alberta
- List of music festivals in Canada
