= C.R. Avery =

C.R. Avery may refer to:

- C.R. Avery, Canadian musician, poet, and member of Tons of Fun University
- C. R. Avery, the pen name of American actress Jane Cowl (1883–1950)
