= Alejandra Robles =

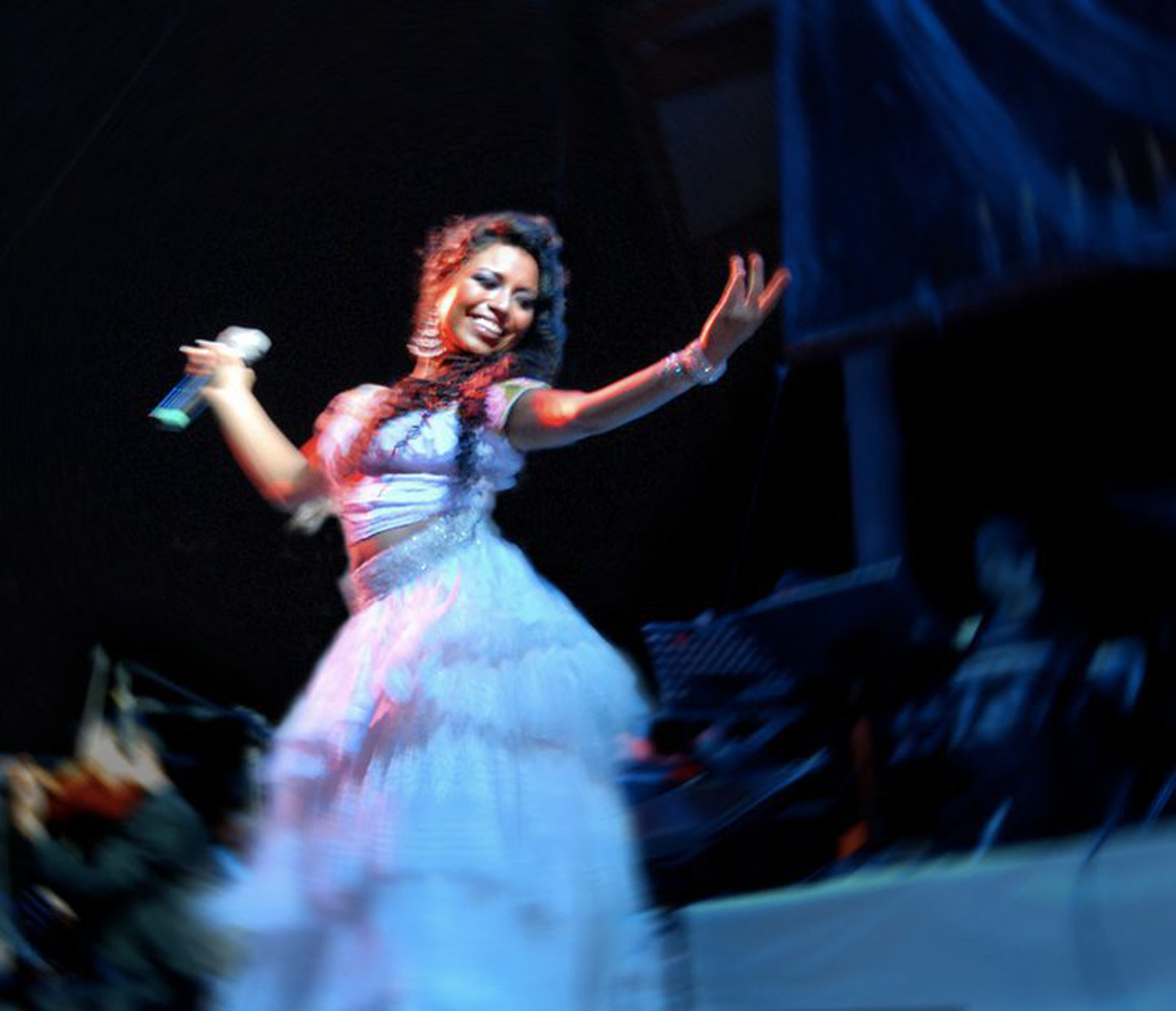
- Robles performing at the London Sunfest music festival in 2012

Background information
- Also known as: La Morena, La Sirenita
- Born: November 28, 1978 (age 47)
- Origin: Puerto Escondido, Oaxaca, Mexico
- Genres: World music
- Occupation: Singer
- Years active: 2001
- Label: Independent

Alejandra Robles Suastegui (born in Puerto Escondido, Oaxaca, Mexico – November 28, 1978) is a Mexican dancer and singer of traditional music. Her musical style represents her Afro-Mexican roots and that of the indigenous peoples of Latin America, in addition to the regional music of Mexico, Colombia and the Caribbean. Her style is based on the sounds of the coast of Oaxaca, Guerrero and Veracruz.

== Biography ==
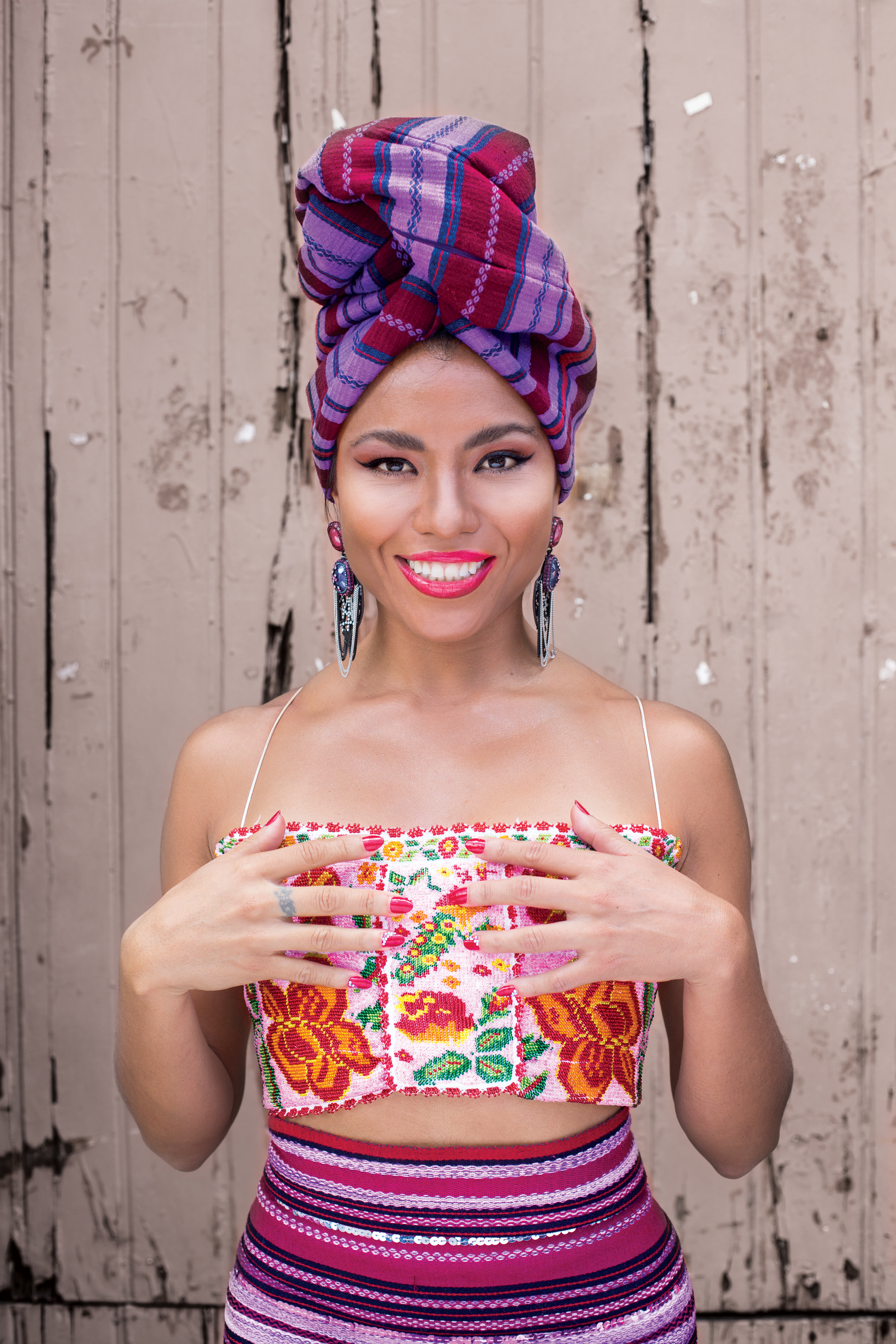

She was born in Puerto Escondido, in the Costa Chica region of Oaxaca state. From a very young age, she showed interest in music and dance, especially the sounds of the coasts by Guerrero and Oaxaca. At the age of 15 years she began studying contemporary song and dance at the School of Fine Arts of Oaxaca.

In 2000, she travelled to Paris, France, to attend the 12th Paris Conservatory of Music; Madame Sulle was her teacher. On her return to Mexico she majored in opera at the Universidad Veracruzana School of Music. There she studied with Benito Navarro (tenor), Guadalupe Colorado (soprano), Cecilia Ladron de Guevara (mezzo-soprano), and Victor Manuel Filobello (tenor), with whom she continues to study classical singing. Meanwhile, she studies dancing (both African and tap) with Rubi Oseguera.

In 2012, she performed alongside the traditional Colombian group, Los Gaiteros de San Jacinto at the Vancouver Folk Music Festival. She also performed in a Jam session with Wazimbo, and Sidi Touré.

== Discography ==
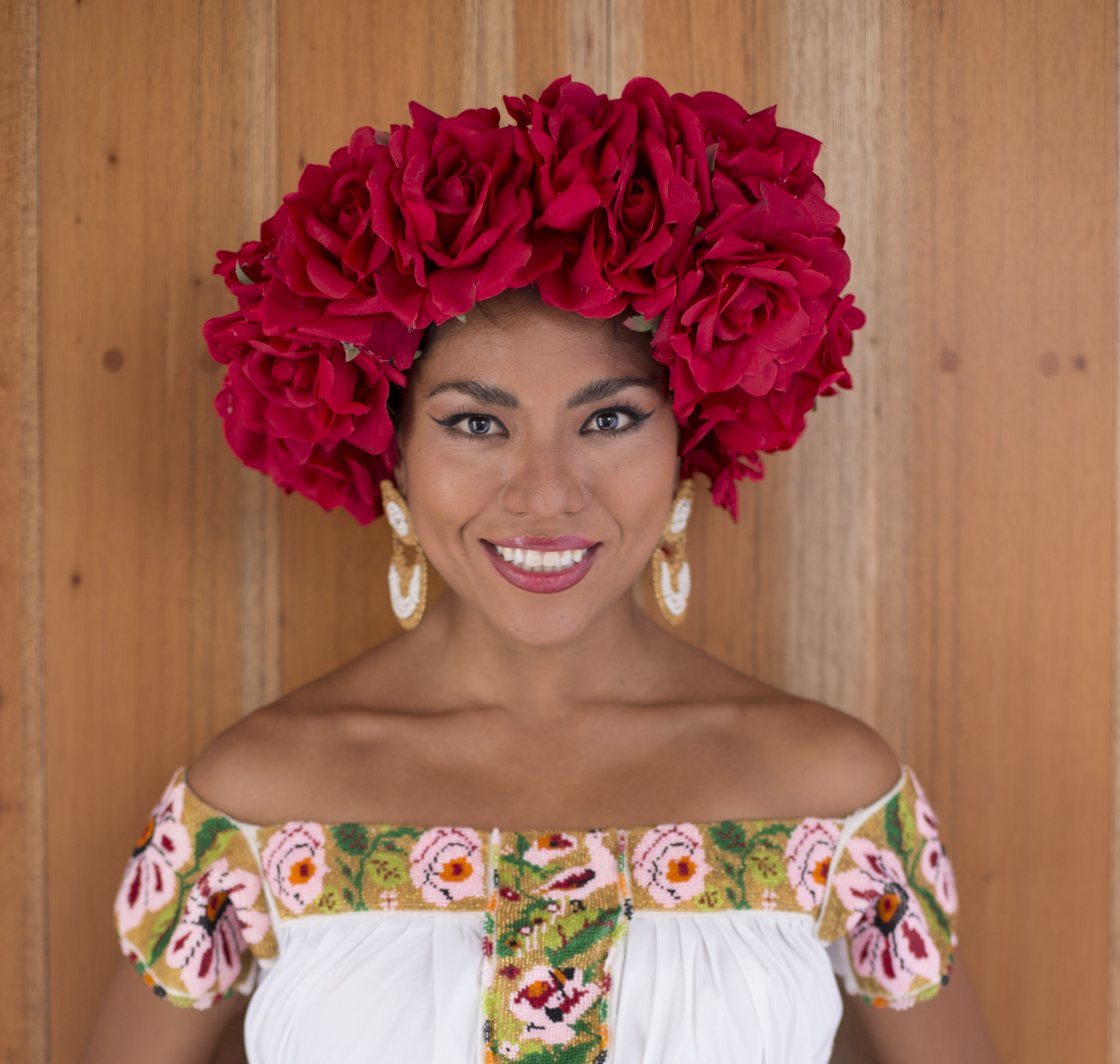

- 2005: La Malagueña
- 2008: La Morena

== Compilations ==
- 2003: "1er. Festival Cultural del Sotavento" – La Bruja & El Cascabel
- 2007: "FAOT 2007" – El Pescador
- 2009: "Armonía en el Zócalo" – "Pinotepa"

== Collaborations ==
- 2008: "Puño de Tierra" – Eugenia León "Sol Redondo" with Vanessa Bauche, Ma. Inés Ochoa and Ernesto Anaya
- 2008: "La Morena" – Armando Manzanero "Adoro", Eugenia León "La Llorona", Ramón Gutiérrez "La Morena" & Abel Bosmenier "El Cascabel"
- 2009: "Huapangueando" – Ernesto Anaya "La Pasión"
- 2010: "Que 20 años no es nada!" – "Como Se Pueda" Feat. Banda de Texcoco
- 2010: "XXV Aniversario" – Orquesta Primavera "Pinotepa"
- 2010: "Cine" – Eugenia León "Ando Borracho"
- 2011: "Mexicolombia" – Carlos Cuevas Cerón "La Llorona"

== Live! ==
- 2008: "Eugenia Leon presents: Puño de Tierra" – Sol Redondo – Teatro Metropolitan – Mex. DF
- 2009: "Festival Humánitas 2009" with Alejandro Flores from Cafe Tacvba – La Huazanga – Oaxaca
- 2009: "Ernesto Anaya presents: Huapangueando" – La Pasión & El Llorar – Teatro de la Ciudad – Mex. DF
- 2010: "Alejandra Robles presents: La Morena!" with Orquesta Primavera – CaSa San Agustín Etla, Oaxaca
- 2010: "Festival Humánitas 2010" with Armando Manzanero – Adoro & De Nagazi – Oaxaca
- 2011: "Concierto por Chacahua" with Orquesta Primavera – Teatro Macedonio Alcala, Oaxaca

== Videos ==
- 2008 "La Morena" Documental with Armando Manzanero, Eugenia León & Pepe Torres
- 2008 "Festival Humánitas" 3 Video Spots Fiestas de Mayo en Oaxaca
- 2009 "Por la Igualdad" Video Conapred & Segob México
- 2010 "La Transformación del Cine en Música" Documental Eugenia León from "Cine" Cd
