= Mighty Mike McGee =

American poet

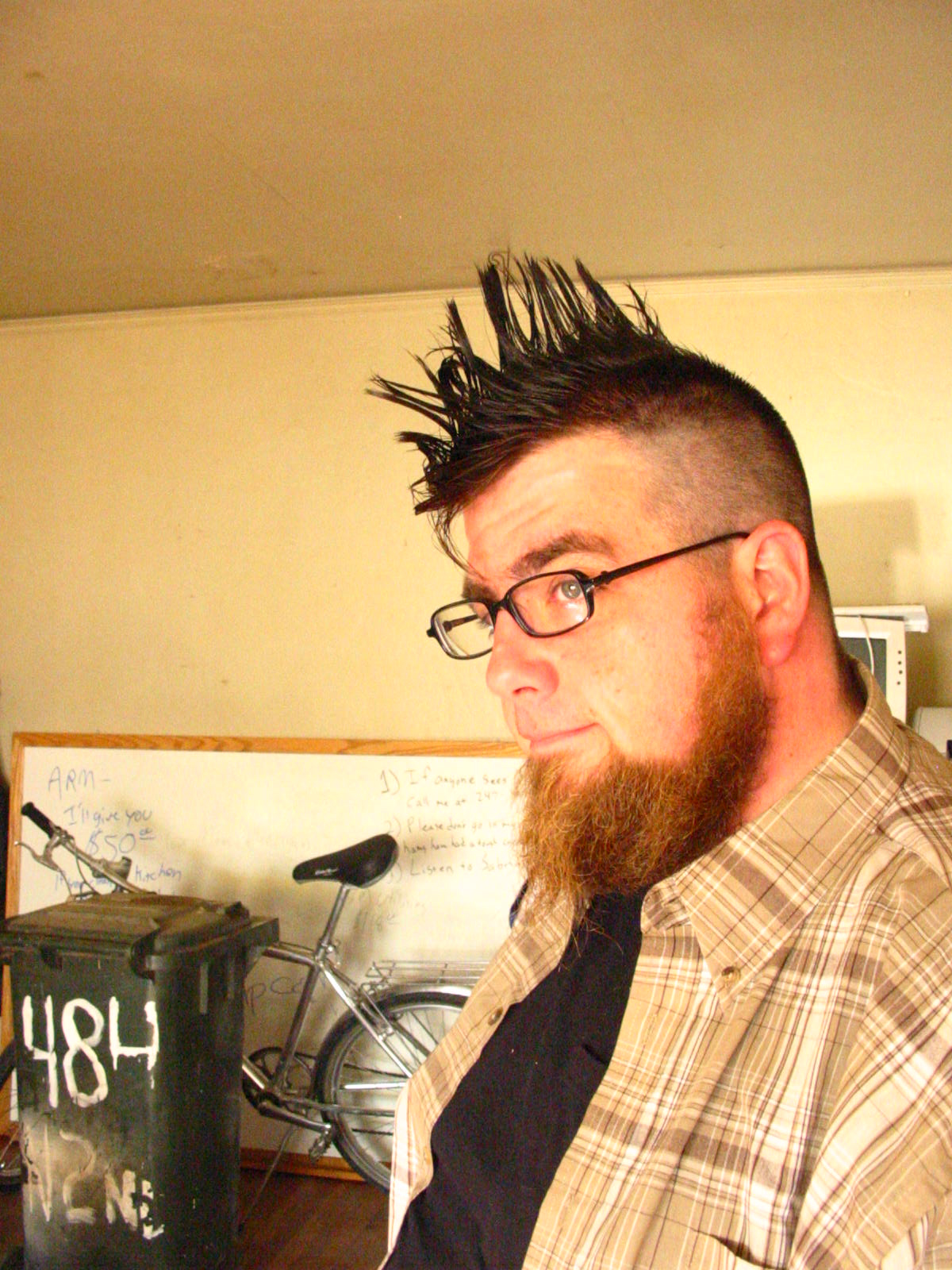
Mike McGee, November 18, 2005

Michael Matthew McGee (born January 12, 1976), more commonly known as Mighty Mike McGee, is an American slam poet.

== Biography ==
McGee is the oldest of eight children from several marriages. He has spent most of his life in and around San Jose, California, where he started his career in spoken word, poetry slam and performance poetry in 1998. He is a contemporary of Jack McCarthy and Buddy Wakefield.

McGee is the first slam poet to win both the American National Poetry Slam Individual Grand Championship (2003) and the Individual World Poetry Slam Championship (2006). From late 2007 to December 2008, he hosted the San Jose Poetry Slam, with Co-Slam Master Christopher Bundy.

In 1999, McGee helped form Bleeding Edge Spoken Word, under the directorship of his then-roommate. Over two and a half years, the two released 33 compilations of contemporary American spoken word. Although the label is now defunct, McGee started his own imprints – 3XMsound and 3XMpress, in 2001 – in order to produce and release his own CDs and chapbooks.

In 2001, after three years of competing at the San José Poetry Slam, McGee earned a spot on the slam team and went to his first National Poetry Slam held that August in Seattle, Washington. He then returned to the National Poetry Slam with the same team in 2003 and 2004.

In 2003, McGee co-founded the Vancouver, British Columbia-based "talk-rock" trio Tons of Fun University with Shane Koyczan and C. R. Avery. Their debut was before a crowd of 15,000 at the Vancouver Folk Music Festival, July 2004. The trio has since toured extensively throughout Canada, performing primarily in music festivals.

In 2005, McGee performed a revised version of his popular poem "Like" on a fifth season episode of Russell Simmons Presents Def Poetry on HBO.

From 2018–2019, McGee was named Santa Clara County Poet Laureate.

== Poetry slam titles ==
- Individual World Poetry Slam Champion, 2006
- International World Poetry Slamionship, 2006 (2nd)
- National Poetry Slam Individual Grand Champion, 2003
- San Jose Poetry Slam Grand Champion, 2003 and 2004
- San Francisco Poetry Slam Grand Champion, 2003

== Discography ==
- The Them They're Talking About (Tons of Fun University EP), 2005, Mother Press Media
- Happy Is The New Sad (guest on track 6, Delta Activity's album), 2005
- New High Score: Best of Urbana Compilation, 2005, The Wordsmith Press
- Live In Denver, 2004, 3XMsound
- For Mayor (Best of), 2003, 3XMsound
- Miscellaneous, 2003, 3XMsound
- Is Beautiful, 2001, 3XMsound (discontinued)
- Mighty, 2000, Bleeding Edge Spoken Word/3XMsound (discontinued)

== Filmography ==
- Ill List Volume 1, 2004, Word Groove, Inc.
- 2003 National Poetry Slam, 2004, Word Groove, Inc.
- Russell Simmons' Present Def Poetry Jam (Season 5, Episode 34)
