= To This Day =

2011 poem by Shane Koyczan

- by Shane Koyczan
- Language: English
- Subject: Bullying
- Genre: Spoken word poem
- Lines: 192

"To This Day" is a 2011 spoken word poem written by Shane Koyczan. In the poem, Koyczan talks about bullying he and others received during their lives and its deep, long-term impact.

Koyczan first came to international notice when he read his poetry at the 2010 Vancouver Olympics' Opening Ceremony.

The poem was first released on Koyczan's 2012 album "Remembrance Year".

Every school was a big top circus tent and the pecking order went from acrobats to lion tamers from clowns to carnies; all of these were miles ahead of who we were we were freaks lobster claw boys and bearded ladies; oddities juggling depression and loneliness playing solitaire spin the bottle trying to kiss the wounded parts of ourselves and heal; but at night while the others slept we kept walking the tightrope it was practice and yeah some of us fell. But I want to tell them that all of this shit is just debris, leftover when we finally decide to smash all the things we thought we used to be, and if you can’t see anything beautiful about yourself, get a better mirror, look a little closer, stare a little longer, because there’s something inside you that made you keep trying despite everyone who told you to quit. You built a cast around your broken heart and signed it yourself. You signed it “They were wrong”. Because maybe you didn’t belong to a group or a clique, maybe they decided to pick you last for basketball or everything. Maybe you used to bring bruises and broken teeth to show and tell but never told, because how can you hold your ground if everyone around you wants to bury you beneath it? You have to believe that they were wrong! They have to be wrong... Why else would we still be here?

— from "To This Day"

== Animated film ==
An animated film for "To This Day" was released onto YouTube on February 19, 2013. It features the work of 12 animators, supported by 80 artists.

The video is part of the To This Day project and was released to mark Pink Shirt Day, an anti-bullying initiative. The project aims to highlight the deep and long-term impact of bullying on the individual and help schools engage better with bullying and child suicide.

== Reception ==
The video received 1.4 million hits in the first two days and currently has over 25 million.

Reception for the poem has been overwhelmingly positive, receiving coverage on CBS and CBC News. Koyczan was chosen to read the poem and show to film at the TED conference, California, in 2013, accompanied by violinist Hannah Epperson. After the video's release Koyczan received hundreds of letters from people that have experienced bullying.

In 2013, Koyczan commented:

My hope is [that it] would reach some of the people who were just out there looking for something to get them through another day. When I wrote the poem two years ago and people started coming to me because they just needed to talk after hearing it, I realized this is not a Canadian problem or an American problem, it’s everywhere...I believe the bullies must be forgiven. That’s how we heal.

Koyczan describes how, following torment at school, he became a bully himself around the age of 14, an image of the thing he hated. He says that keeping communication channels open and clear between parents and their children will help address bullying issues. He commented that he hopes the poem and the project will promote a connectivity between those who have suffered from bullying, that they might feel less isolated. The project aims to help schools engage better with bullying and child suicide.

The books has since been published by Annick Press as a graphic novel, entitled "To This Day: For the Bullied and Beautiful".
