= The Honeycutters =

American country band

Amanda Anne Platt & The Honeycutters
- Origin: Asheville, North Carolina, United States
- Genres: Alternative country; Americana; country
- Years active: 2007-present
- Labels: Organic Records, Mule Kick Records
- Members: Amanda Anne Platt; Rick Cooper; Evan Martin; Matt Smith; Kevin Williams
- Website: www.honeycutters.com

Amanda Anne Platt & The Honeycutters is an Americana band based in Asheville, North Carolina in the United States.

== Background ==
The Honeycutters was founded in 2007 by Amanda Anne Platt and former guitarist Peter James based around Platt's songwriting. Originally called the Bee's Knees, the band derived its current name from a Tow truck company in Asheville, NC. They released their first studio album, Irene, in 2009. The band has performed throughout the United States, Canada, The Netherlands, Germany, and the UK, including the Vancouver Folk Music Festival, Rochester International Jazz Festival, Folk Alliance International, AmericanaFest, MerleFest, and Mountain Stage. In 2016, they were featured on NPR's World Cafe: Sense of Place Asheville.

== Band members ==
- Amanda Anne Platt: vocals, acoustic guitar, songwriting
- Rick Cooper: bass, vocals
- Evan Martin: drums, vocals
- Matt Smith: pedal steel guitar, electric guitar
- Kevin Williams: keyboards, vocals

== Discography ==
=== Albums ===
Title	Details
Irene	Released: May 1, 2009; Label: self-released
When Bitter Met Sweet	Released: May 1, 2012; Label: self-released
Me Oh My	Released: April 21, 2015; Label: Organic Records
On The Ropes	Released: May 20, 2016; Label: Organic Records
Amanda Anne Platt & The Honeycutters	Released: June 9, 2017; Label: Organic Records
Live at the Grey Eagle	Released: May 24, 2019; Label: Organic Records
Christmas on a Greyhound Bus (EP)	Released: November 22, 2019; Label: Organic Records
The Devil and the Deep Blue Sea	Released: February 25, 2022; Label: Organic Records
The Ones That Stay	Released: August 9, 2024; Label: Mule Kick Records

== Music videos ==
Year	Title
2015	"Jukebox"
2017	"Birthday Song"
2021	"New York"

== Album reviews ==
=== When Bitter Met Sweet (2012) ===
CD Review: The Honeycutters ~ 'When Bitter Met Sweet' (Folk Alley)

=== Me Oh My (2015) ===
The Honeycutters - Me Oh My (No Depression)

Album Review – The Honeycutters' 'Me Oh My' (Country Perspective)

The Honeycutters - Me Oh My (American Roots UK)

Best Country Music Albums of 2015 (The Telegraph)

=== On The Ropes (2016) ===
The Honeycutters Emerge as Clear Contenders (No Depression)

The Honeycutters continue to climb the 'Ropes' of musical success (The Daily Times)

The Honeycutters Mine Classic Country with 'On The Ropes' (Album Review) (Glide Magazine)

The Honeycutters Fight Back With The Barn Burning Title Track Of Their Upcoming Release, "On The Ropes" (Elmore Magazine)

Top 10 Country Albums Of 2016 (Your Life In A Song)

=== Amanda Anne Platt & The Honeycutters (2017) ===
An Open Letter to Amanda Anne Platt & The Honeycutters (No Depression)

Album review: 'Amanda Anne Platt & the Honeycutters' (MountainXpress)

ALBUM REVIEW: AMANDA ANNE PLATT & THE HONEYCUTTERS (SELF-TITLED) (Country Exclusive)

AMANDA ANNE PLATT & THE HONEYCUTTERS (SELF-TITLED) (Folk Radio UK)

Amanda Anne Platt & the Honeycutters - Amanda Anne Platt & the Honeycutters : Organic Records (Three Chords and the Truth UK)

Review: Amanda Anne Platt & The Honeycutters (Americana Music Show)

Amanda Anne Platt and the Honeycutters "Amanda Anne Platt and the Honeycutters" (Organic, 2017) (Americana UK)

AMANDA ANNE PLATT & THE HONEYCUTTERS – Amanda Anne Platt & The Honeycutters (Organic Records OR 16902) (Folking.com)

=== Live at the Grey Eagle (2019) ===
Song Premiere: Amanda Anne Platt’s “Low Road” From “Live At The Grey Eagle” (Americana Highways)

Amanda Anne Platt & The Honeycutters Offer Up More Than Just Another Road Song With "18 Wheels" (Pop Matters)

AMANDA ANNE PLATT & THE HONEYCUTTERS Live At The Grey Eagle (Take Effect)

Amanda Platt & Honeycutters - Live at the Grey Eagle – 2019 (Organic) (Country Standard Time)

=== Christmas on a Greyhound Bus (EP) (2019) ===
AMANDA ANNE PLATT & THE HONEYCUTTERS BRING THEIR ROOTS COUNTRY STYLE TO CHRISTMAS (Country Music News International)

Song Premiere: Amanda Anne Platt’s “Christmas On A Greyhound Bus” (Americana Highways)

EP review: ‘Christmas on a Greyhound Bus’ by Amanda Anne Platt & The Honeycutters (Mountain Xpress)

Amanda Anne Platt & The Honeycutters “Christmas On A Greyhound Bus” (Organic Records, 2019) (Americana UK)

=== Singles (2020-2021) ===
Song Premiere: Amanda Anne Platt & the Honeycutters, "Desert Flowers" (Folk Alley)

Song Premiere: Amanda Anne Platt And The Honeycutters “There May Come A Day” (Americana Highways)

Hear It First: Amanda Anne Platt & the Honeycutters, "New York" and "Open Up Your Door" (Folk Alley)

Daily Discovery: Amanda Anne Platt & The Honeycutters Cultivate Classic Country Vibes On New Double-Single (American Songwriter)

=== The Devil and the Deep Blue Sea (2022) ===
ALBUM REVIEW: Amanda Anne Platt and The Honeycutters Cover Vast Ground on ‘The Devil and The Deep Blue Sea’ (No Depression)

Interview: Amanda Anne Platt Of The Honeycutters Talks New Double Album ‘The Devil & The Deep Blue Sea’ (Music Mecca)

Epic Americana Anthems and Sobering Narratives From Amanda Anne Platt & the Honeycutters (New York Music Daily)

Album Review: Amanda Anne Platt and the Honeycutters — The Devil and the Deep Blue Sea (Musoscribe)

Amanda Anne Platt: Bad Poetry (The Bluegrass Standard)
