= Laetitia Zonzambé =

Central African pop musician

- Citizenship: Central African Republic
- Occupation: Singer

Laetitia Zonzambé is a pop music star in Central African Republic. Her career has been supported by Alliance Française and the United Nations Development Programme.

Her songs and music, based on traditional African elements with European and Caribbean influences, have attracted the attention of fans in Africa and abroad, mainly among Africans in France. She sings mostly in her home nation’s lingua franca, Sango and in tribal languages such as Yakoma. Zonzambé performs in a soulful style and demonstrates this throughout her oeuvre, such as in her cover of Otis Redding’s Fa-Fa-Fa-Fa-Fa (Sad Song) in Fafa.
