= Ragpicker String Band =

Folk-blues trio

The Ragpicker String Band is a Memphis, Tennessee-based folk-blues trio consisting of Rich DelGrosso (mandolin), Mary Flower (guitar), and Martin Grosswendt (multiple instruments). They released their self-titled debut album in 2015 on Yellow Dog Records. The album was mixed by Stuart Sullivan at Wire Recording in Austin, Texas, and produced by Mark "Kaz" Kazanoff. It was nominated for Best Acoustic Album of the Year at the 2016 Blues Music Awards.

== Reviews ==
Robert Christgau gave The Ragpicker String Band an A− grade, highlighting the band's cover of "Google Blues" and praising DelGrosso's mandolin playing. Mark Thompson of Blues Blast magazine also reviewed the album favorably, writing, "the Ragpicker String Band delivers a treasure-trove of originals and covers that hark back to a by-gone era, yet sound totally modern in their expert hands." Cam Hayden of CKUA Radio Network named the album one of his five favorite albums of 2015.

== Discography ==
- The Ragpicker String Band (Yellow Dog, 2015)
