= Vancouver Folk Song Society =

Canadian organization that promotes folk music and organizes amateur singing events

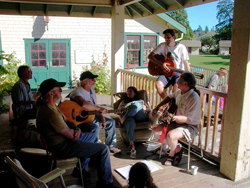
VFSS music retreat.

The Vancouver Folk Song Society is a nonprofit organization that promotes folk music in the Vancouver, British Columbia, area. The society was founded in 1959 as the Folk Song Circle. The VFSS is not primarily a venue for concerts by professional performers, but a place where everyone is encouraged to participate in music.

The society meets twice monthly at the Friends Meeting House in south Vancouver for music events and holds an annual folk music retreat outside of the city.

== Goals ==
The VFSS is dedicated to promoting the singing, study, and enjoyment of folk music. Its main focus is on participatory music, i.e., music that is shared between equals rather than music performed by a highly accomplished performer for a passive audience. Most events are informal and encourage participation by everyone.

== Style ==
The VFSS has always been a haven for traditional ballads and songs from Canada, the United States, and the British Isles, but has also welcomed a wide range of music, including instrumental music from diverse folk traditions.

Most events are acoustic (no amplification or microphones) and a cappella singing (without the accompaniment of musical instruments) makes up a significant part of the music. Most singers encourage the group to sing along and harmonize on choruses of well-known songs and the general atmosphere is one of encouragement and sharing a common love of folk music.

== History ==
In 1959, a group of friends in Vancouver, British Columbia, began meeting regularly to sing folk songs and share traditional music. This original group included Al Cox, Phil Thomas, Rolf Ingelsrud, and Hilda Thomas.

Their meeting venue for many years was the YMCA on Alma Street and the group was informally known as the “Alma Y Folk Circle.” Although the group was always focused on participatory music, it did host concerts by folk artists such as Roy Bailey and Kevin Burke.

For several years, from 1977 onward, the society ran the Green Cove Coffee House. In the 1970s, the VFSS became involved with publishing, putting out the periodical Come All Ye from 1972 to 1977, and The Canada Folk Bulletin from 1978 to 1980.

50th anniversary concert, October, 2009.

The society's involvement with political events such as peace rallies and labour strikes began early and, while rising and falling with the political tides and the interests of the members at any given time, this social consciousness has remained a constant thread throughout the group's history.

In 2011, the society established its own YouTube channel, vanfolksongs, with the goal of posting videos filmed at their events.

The VFSS celebrated its 60th anniversary in 2019.

== Radio ==
The VFSS produced a radio program titled Folk Circle for the radio station CFRO-FM beginning in 1975 and running through the late seventies.

== Shanty singing ==
The Shanty Crew was an offshoot of the VFSS from 1984 until 2004. For two decades, they performed sailors’ working songs at the Vancouver Maritime Museum, welcomed crowds at the Richmond Tall Ships Festival, and appeared at Vancouver's Cityfest and Seattle's Folklife Festival. The Crew recorded a CD titled Blow the Man Down: Tall Ships in the Fraser, complete with detailed historical notes on local maritime history.

In 2009, members of the VFSS formed a new shanty group, The Lazy Jacks, to carry on this tradition of singing maritime music.
