= Shane Koyczan =

Canadian spoken word poet, writer, and member of the group Tons of Fun University

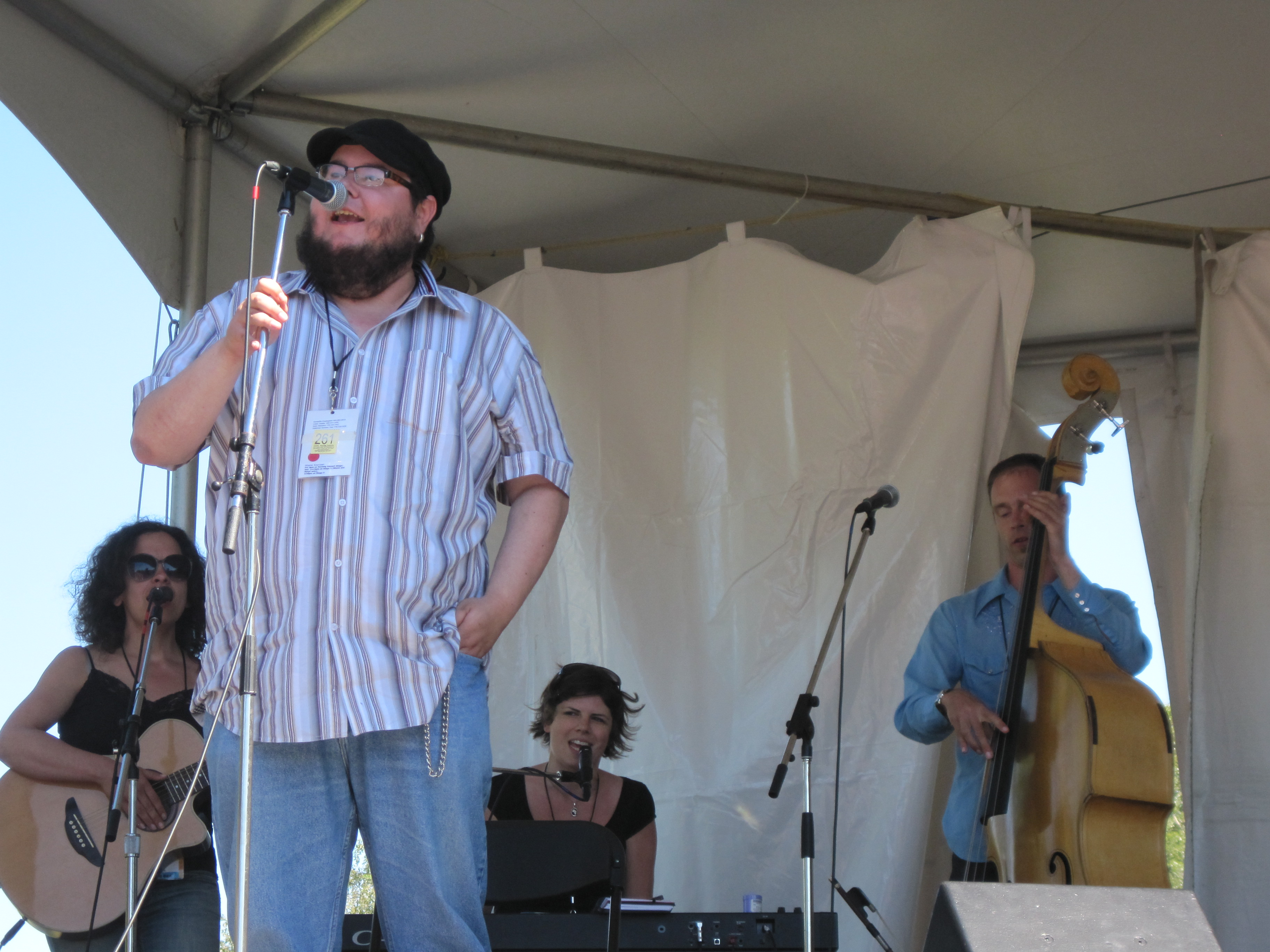
- Shane Koyczan
- Born: Shane L. Koyczan; 22 May 1976 (age 50); Yellowknife, Northwest Territories, Canada
- Occupations: Poet and writer
- Known for: Spoken word poems
- Website: shanekoyczan.com

Shane L. Koyczan /ˈkɔɪˌzæn/ (born 22 May 1976), is a Canadian spoken word poet, writer, and member of the group Tons of Fun University. He is known for writing about issues like bullying, cancer, death, and eating disorders. He is most famous for the anti-bullying poem "To This Day" which has over 25 million views on YouTube.

== Background ==
Koyczan was born in Northwest Territories, to a Canadian Indigenous father and a French mother. He grew up in Penticton, British Columbia. In 2000, he became the first Canadian to win the Individual Championship title at the beach National Poetry Slam. Together with American slam poet Mighty Mike McGee and fellow Canadian C. R. Avery, he is a co-founder of Vancouver, British Columbia spoken word, "talk rock" trio, Tons of Fun University (T.O.F.U.). In August 2007 Shane Koyczan and his work were the subject of an episode of the television documentary series Heart of a Poet, produced by Canadian filmmaker Maureen Judge for broadcaster Bravo!.

Koyczan has published several books, including poetry collection Visiting Hours, Stickboy, a novel in verse, Our Deathbeds will be Thirsty, To This Day: For the Bullied and Beautiful and A Bruise on Light. Visiting Hours was selected by both the Guardian and Globe and Mail for their 2005 Best Books of the Year lists.

Koyczan's "We Are More" and Ivan Bielinski's "La première fois", commissioned by the Canadian Tourism Commission, were unveiled at Canada Day festivities on Parliament Hill in Ottawa on 1 July 2007. Koyczan performed a variation on his piece at the Opening Ceremony of the 2010 Winter Olympics in Vancouver.

Koyczan also collaborated on Vancouver-based musician Dan Mangan's Roboteering EP on the track Tragic Turn of Events – Move Pen Move.

In 2012, Shane Koyczan released a full-length digital album entitled "Remembrance Year", which "tackles abuse with courage and displacement with inspiration", in collaboration with the folk instrumentation of his band, The Short Story Long.

In February 2013, Koyczan released an animated video of his spoken word poem "To This Day" on YouTube and at the TED Conference. The poem focused on the subject of bullying that Koyczan and others had received during their life and its lasting effects. "To This Day" went viral shortly after its release, with the video receiving over 20 million views as of January 2017, prompting many viewers to send Koyczan letters thanking him for publishing the poem.

He has described himself as an 'okay atheist'.

== Bibliography ==
- I'm Calling You a Friend
- Help Wanted
- I Drew That For You
- Visiting Hours (2005, Mother Press Media; ISBN 978-0-9738131-0-4)
- the Stickboy (2008, House of Parlance Media ISBN 978-0-9738131-6-6)
- Our Deathbeds will be Thirsty (2012, House of Parlance Media)
- To This Day: For the Bullied and Beautiful (2014, Annick Press, ISBN 9781554516391)
- A Bruise on Light (2014, Stickboy Press, ISBN 9780991971831)
- The Basement In My Attic (2019, Stickboy Press)

== Discography ==
- Perfect (2000)
- 2nd Time Around
- Visiting Hours
- American Pie Chart (2004)
- The Them They're Talking About (2005) - With Tons of Fun University
- A Pretty Decent Cape in My Closet (2008) - With The Short Story Long
  - includes "The Crickets Have Arthritis"
- Hard to Tell (2009) - With Tons of Fun University
- Shut Up And Say Something (2009)
- Remembrance Year (2011) - With The Short Story Long
- Silence is a Song I Know All the Words To (2014)
- Debris (2015) - With The Short Story Long

== Filmography ==
- The 2000 National Poetry Slam Finals (2000, The Wordsmith Press)
- To This Day Project (2013) – spoken word poem
- Shut Up and Say Something (2017, dir. Melanie Wood), which won the "Most Popular Canadian Documentary" award at the 2017 Vancouver International Film Festival.
