= Quique Escamilla =

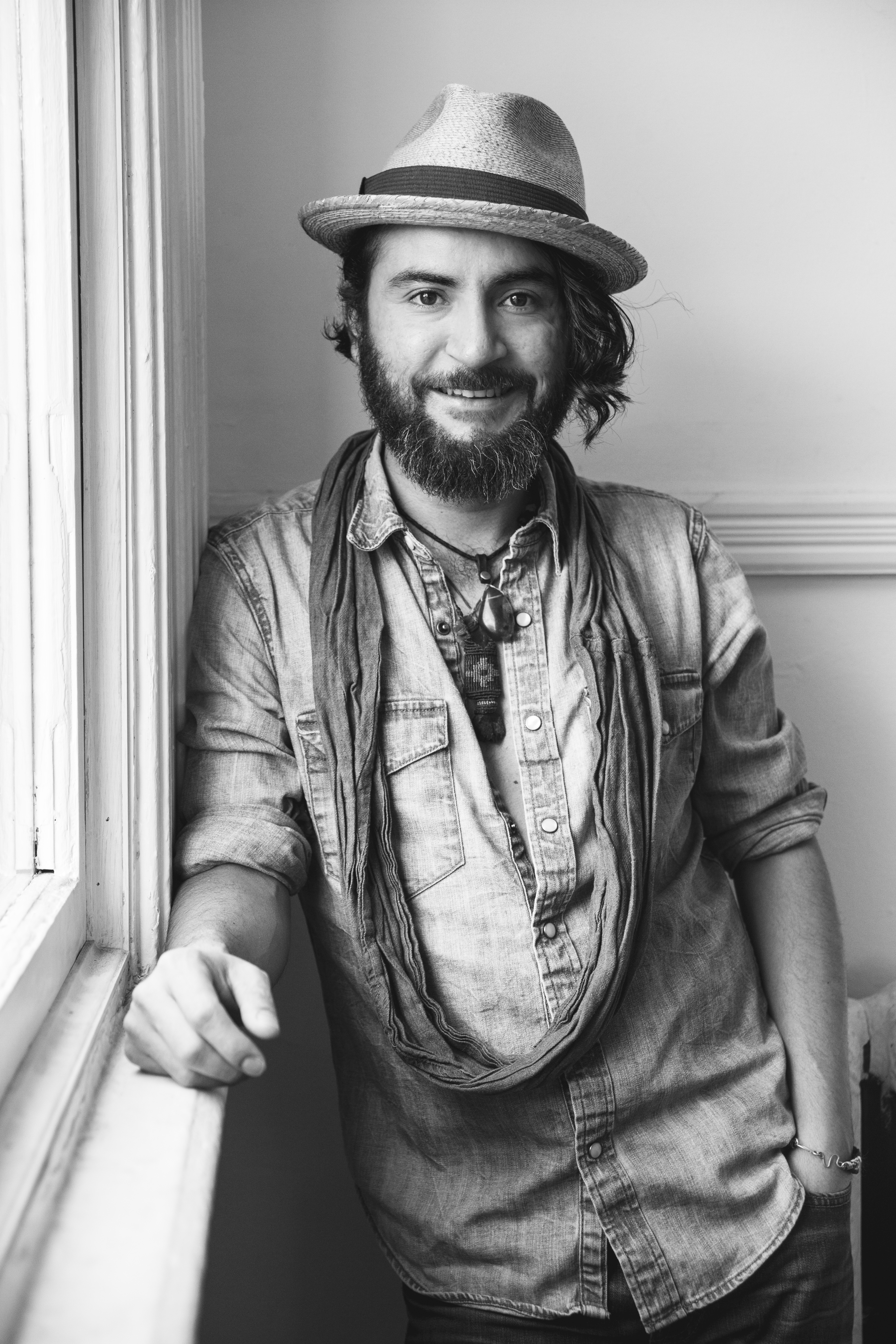
- Toronto

Background information
- Born: December 18, 1980 (age 45); Tuxtla Gutiérrez, Chiapas, Mexico
- Genres: Folk, Rock, World
- Occupations: Musician singer-songwriter producer
- Instruments: Electric guitar, voice, drums, bass
- Years active: 1994–present
- Website: quiqueescamilla.com

Quique Escamilla (born December 18, 1980) is a Mexican Mayan-Zapotec born and raised in Chiapas. He is a multi-instrumentalist musician, singer-songwriter, producer, who won the Juno Award for World Music Album of the Year at the Juno Awards of 2015 with his first full-length and self-produced album, 500 Years of Night.

Escamilla also won a Canadian Folk Music Award for World Music Solo Artist of the Year at the 10th Canadian Folk Music Awards in 2014.

== Early years ==
Born and raised in Tuxtla Gutiérrez, Chiapas, Mexico, Escamilla began playing and making music in the early 1990s as a teenager. He first learned to sing traditional Mexican ballads his mother taught him as a young kid. Eventually he taught himself how to play guitar and formed his first rock band at 14 years old, which covered punk rock and heavy metal songs. In his early twenties he became interested in playing all kinds of music, from blues, reggae, jazz, to pop and world music. He moved and lived in Mexico City for a couple of years before moving to Canada in December 2007—settling in Toronto, Ontario.

== Career ==
He recorded, mixed, mastered and produced his self-titled debut EP in his Toronto bedroom. That EP was released in Toronto, along with a live concert recorded by CBC Radio One's Canada Live at Lula Lounge in January 2012. The recording from this concert was featured on CBC's Big City Small World.

He followed up with a studio production on 500 Years of Night in April 2014. Such album represented a political statement from Escamilla. At his live shows, he has stated his support towards the oppressed indigenous people who struggle against racism in his "homeland of Chiapas, the rest of Mexico, and across the Americas". His album's commentary also sounds strongly influenced by the message and struggle of the Zapatista Army of National Liberation (EZLN). Its booklet included a powerful photo collection of the Chiapas' movement, taken by the renowned Mexican photographer, Marco Antonio Cruz—winner of the Grange Prize in Canada and photography director of the political magazine Proceso in Mexico City.

Escamilla has toured extensively across Canada since 2012. At the 2013 Interstellar Rodeo, he performed with Jim Cuddy and Danny Michel as part of a one-off supergroup billed as the Interstellar All-Stars. In 2016 he debuted in Europe doing four consecutive tours the same year, including Italy, France, Spain, Belgium, and the Netherlands.

He has performed and appeared at international music conferences such as Folk Alliance International in Kansas City, US (2015 and 2016), Mundial Montreal (2012), and the World Music Expo (2016), in Santiago de Compostela, Spain.

He performed for the first time at the Montréal International Jazz Festival in July 2016.

In September 2018, he debuted in Chicago at the renowned Jay Pritzker Pavilion in Millennium Park, as part of the Chicago World Music Festival.

In November 2018, Quique Escamilla headlined his first show at Koerner Hall of the Royal Conservatory Museum in Toronto. He presented Day of the Dead: Heroes, a multi-disciplinary show created and curated by Escamilla himself, that included elements of theatre, dance, story-telling, gastronomy and music. The venue and stage were transformed into a portal between life and death while using traditional Mexican “Day of the Dead” decorations and altar installations. While committed to support socio-political causes throughout his music, Quique dedicated his performance and this special occasion to remember and honour some departed world figures who have fearlessly fought or given their lives to stand up for either justice, freedom, peace or equality such as Martin Luther King Jr., Emiliano Zapata, Malcolm X, Ché Guevara, Salvador Allende and Nelson Mandela; as well as modern-day activists who were and continue to be persecuted or murdered for defending their ancestral land and human rights such as Berta Cáceres and Julián Carrillo.

In more recent years, he has appeared at major, international folk, blues and jazz festivals, sharing stages with world-class artists of diverse genres such as Los Lobos, Michael Franti, Gustavo Santaolalla, Cyril Neville and the Royal Southern Brotherhood, Mokoomba, Calypso Rose, Bonnie Raitt, Serena Ryder, Ron Sexsmith, Kobo Town, Alabama Shakes, Alex Cuba, Buffy Sainte-Marie, Fred Penner, Los Texmaniacs and Puerto Candelaria.

His second full-length album Encomienda was released in February, 2019. It was nominated for Best Solo World Music Album of the Year at the Canadian Folk Music Awards in 2020.

In September 2021, Quique Escamilla created and directed the first edition of Tlalli, a festival dedicated to honouring and celebrating a multi-millenary-old connection that exists among the wide family of Indigenous Peoples across the Americas: from Guaranís in Brazil, Incas in Perú, Aztecs in México, to Six Nations in Canada and beyond.

== Discography ==
- Quique Escamilla (2012) – Self-released.
- 500 Years of Night (2014) – Lulaworld Records
- Encomienda (2019) — Copal Records.

== Awards and nominations ==
Year	Nominee / work	Award	Result
2015	500 Years of Night	Juno Awards: World Music Album of the Year	Winner
2014	500 Years of Night	Canadian Folk Music Awards: World Solo Artist of the Year	Winner
2020	Encomienda	Canadian Folk Music Awards: World Solo Artist of the Year	Nominated

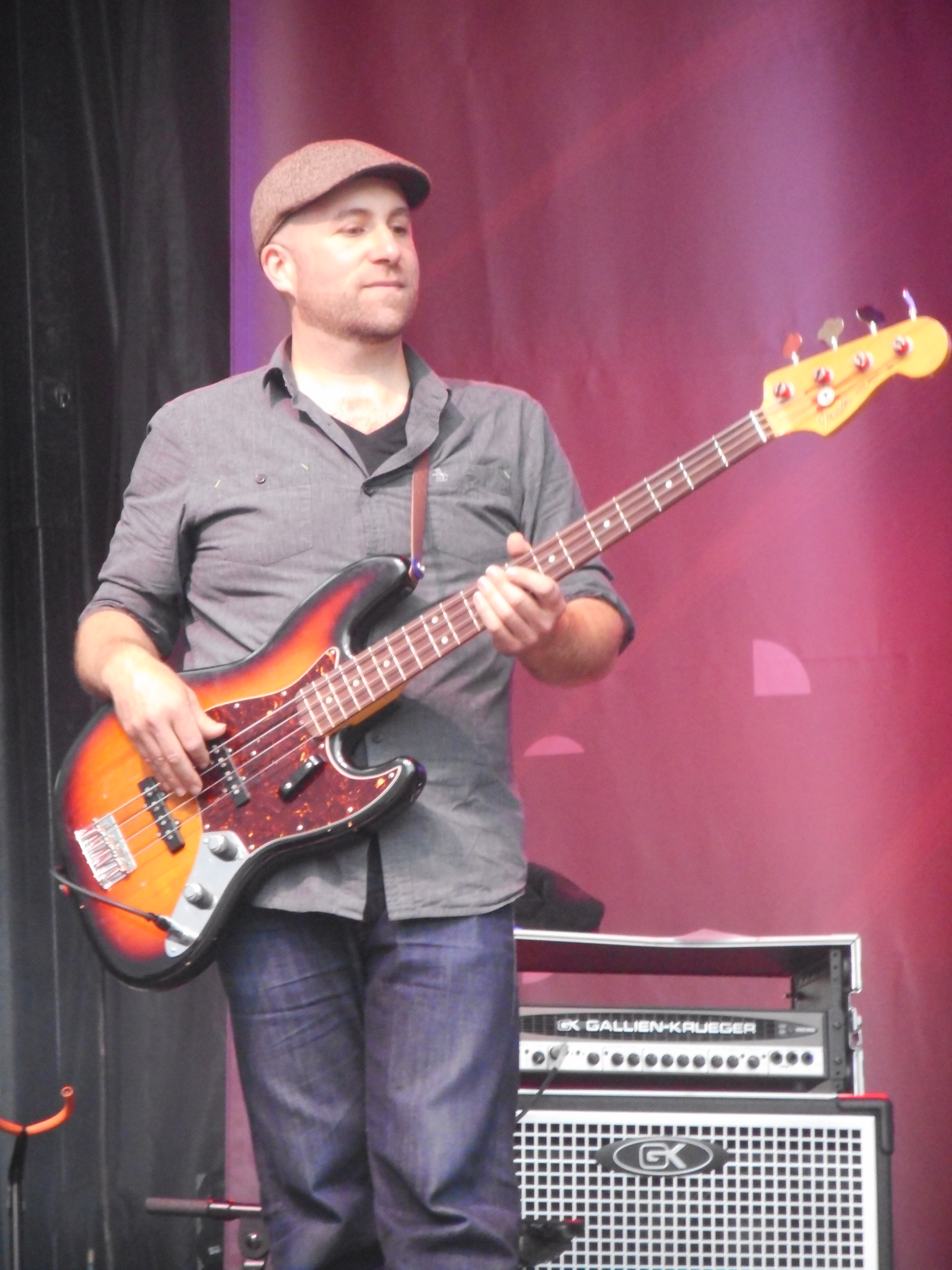

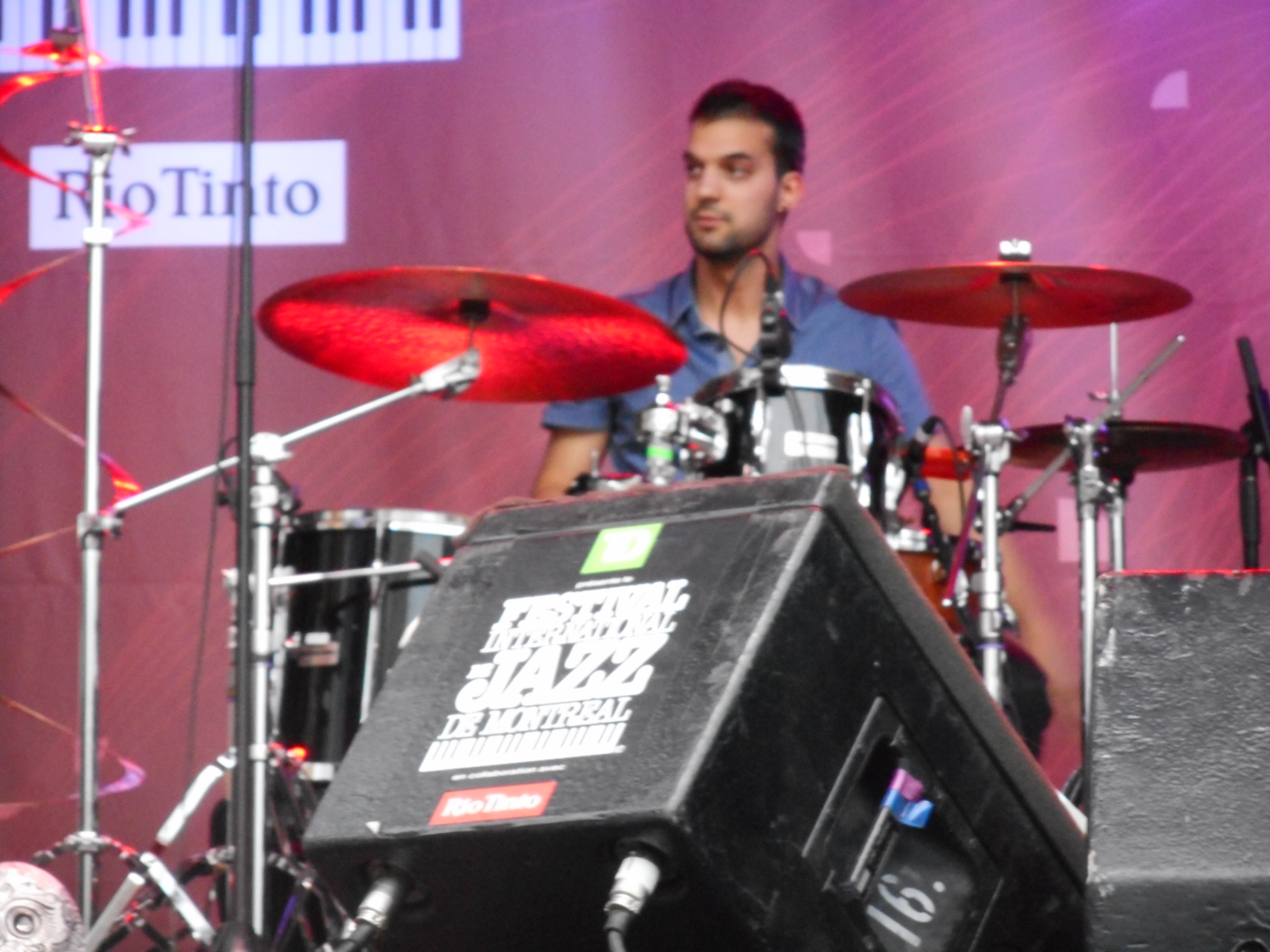

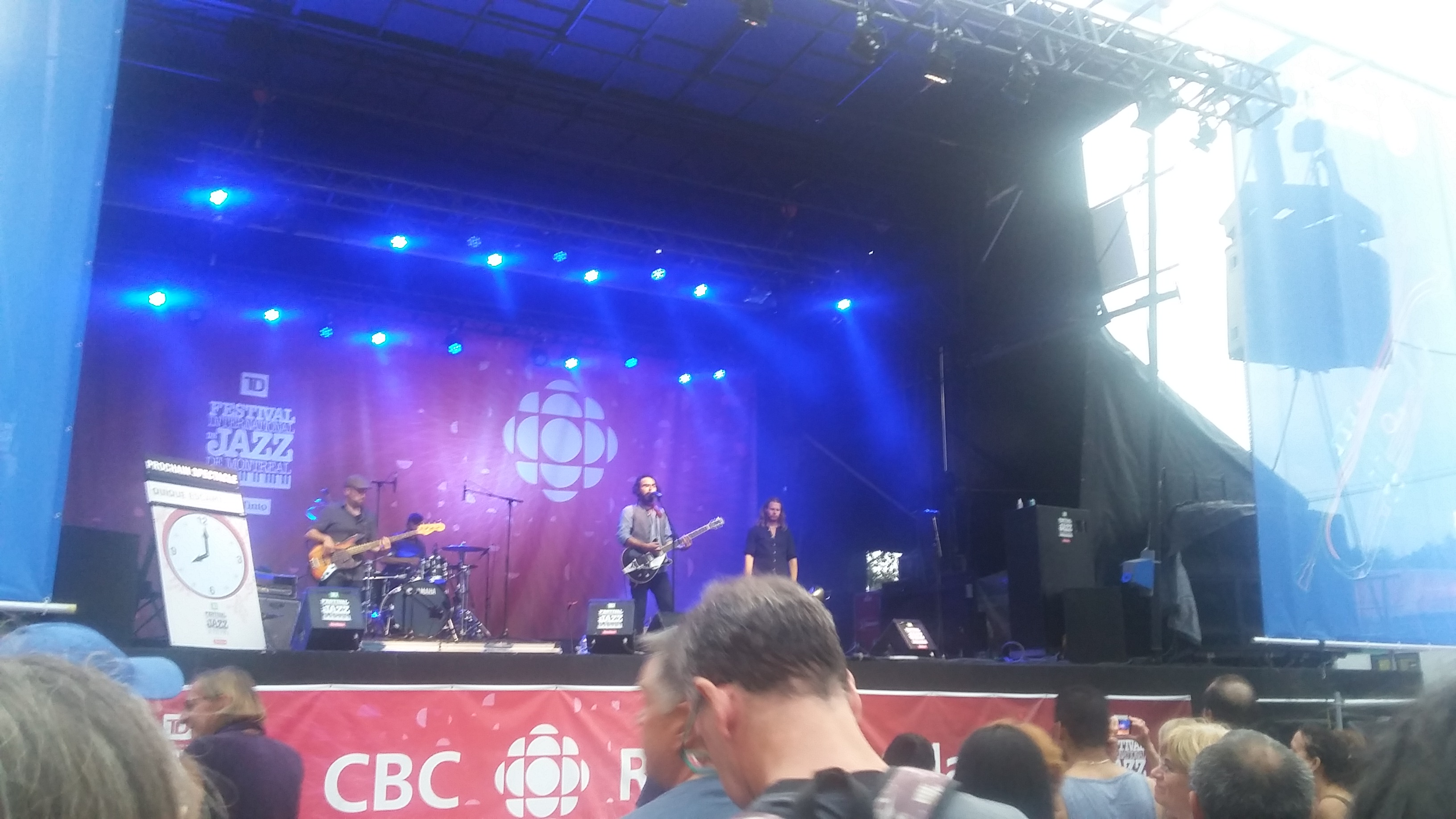

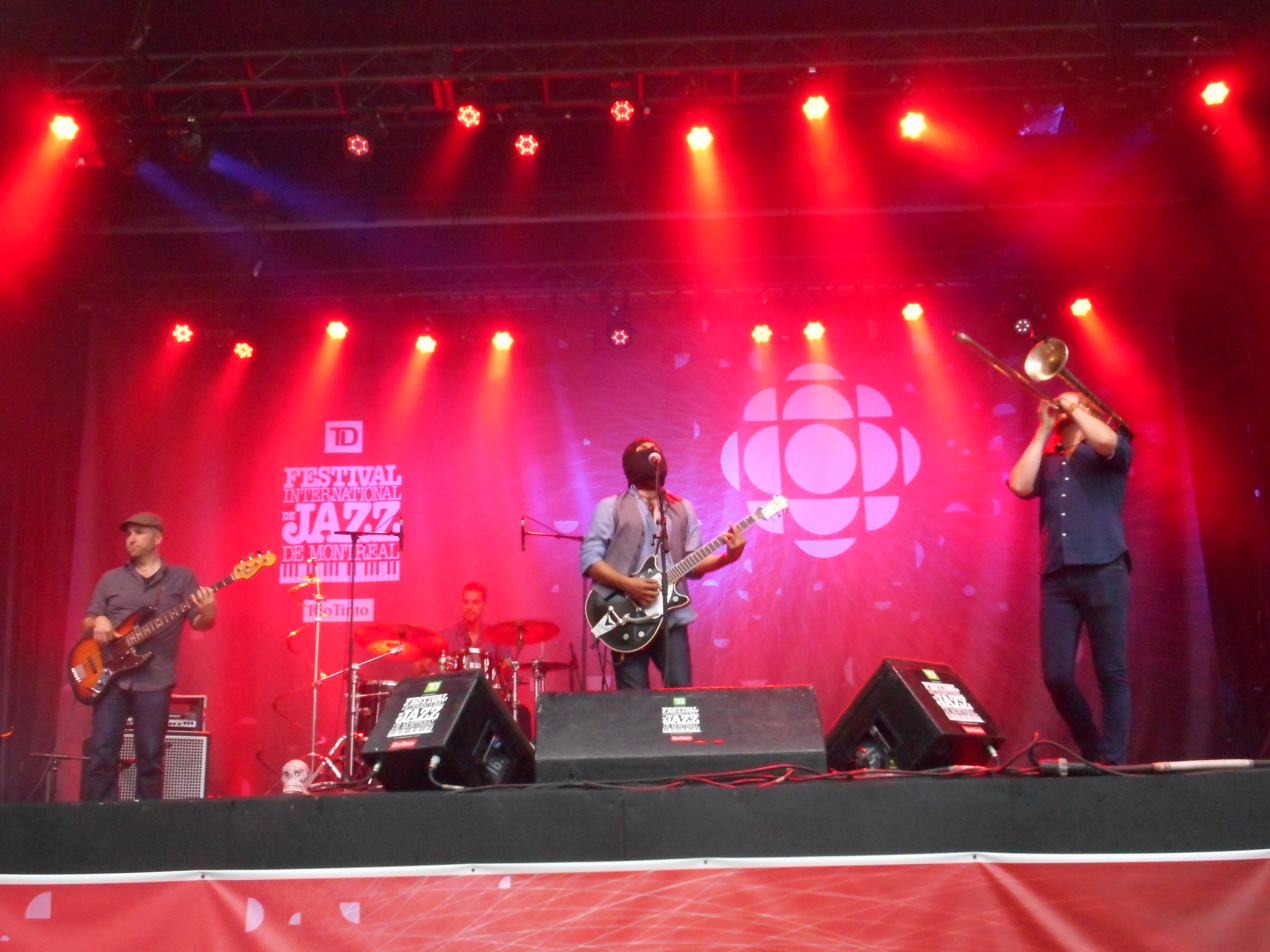
