= Tons of Fun University =

Canadian spoken word trio

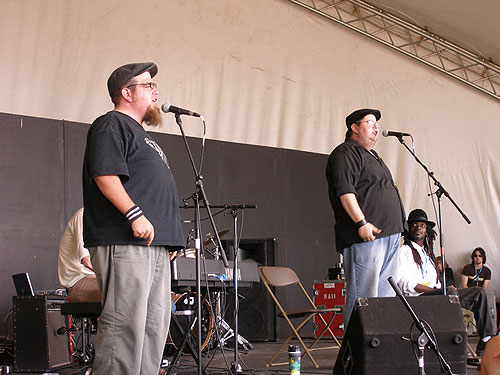

Background information
- Origin: Vancouver, British Columbia, Canada
- Genres: Spoken word
- Years active: 2003–present
- Labels: Battle Axe Records
- Members: Shane Koyczan, C. R. Avery, Mighty Mike McGee

Tons of Fun University is a musical, spoken word trio based in Vancouver, British Columbia, Canada, which formed in 2003. It consists of Canadian poets Shane Koyczan and C. R. Avery, and American poet Mighty Mike McGee.

The group tours their self-described "talk rock" around many of the North American music festivals and theaters. Tons of Fun University, also known as T.O.F.U., are historically rooted in poetry slam. In 2000, Koyczan became the first international slam poet to win the National Poetry Slam Individual Grand Championship, an award won by McGee in 2003. Avery became noticed in the Vancouver poetry slam scene by incorporating keyboards, harmonica, poetry and beatboxing – simultaneously – throughout his performances. These elements are heavily used in the group's performances, along with influences pulled from hip hop, rock and roll, folk music and spoken word. They have described themselves as a cross between LL Cool J and Sylvia Plath.

Tons of Fun University was formed in August 2003 by Shane Koyczan and Mike McGee and first performed at the Café Deux Soleil on 16 December 2003. C.R. Avery joined in 2004 with the trio's debut at the 2004 Vancouver Folk Music Festival. The group was commissioned to write a poem/song for the mainstage event called "Come A Long Way". The groups performance at the 2005 Vancouver Folk Music Festival was seen by Youthink Magazine as one of the highlights of the concert.

== Discography ==
The Them They're Talking About (EP), 2005

1. "static" – 3:58
2. "New Chapter in the Book of Hobo" – 5:11
3. "Skin" – 4:42
4. "Mycrophone" – 3:00
5. "The Night" – 6:25
6. "Pocketknife" – 5:35
7. "Letter to Neil Armstrong" – 4:22
8. "Postcards From New York" – 4:53
9. "Come A Long Way" – 5:47
10. "Move Pen Move" – 5:36
11. "(dirge)" – 0:27
12. "Onto Something" – 5:36

Hard to Tell (EP), 2009

1. "Shake the Dust" – 3:00
2. "But If We Were" – 3:37
3. "Ste. Marie" – 4:38
4. "Before We Leave" – 7:18
5. "In Search Of Midnight" – 4:24
6. "Broken Eyes" – 8:05
7. "Bedtime Stories" – 4:29
8. "Tons of Fun University" – 5:00
