= Sidi Touré =

Malian musician (born 1959)

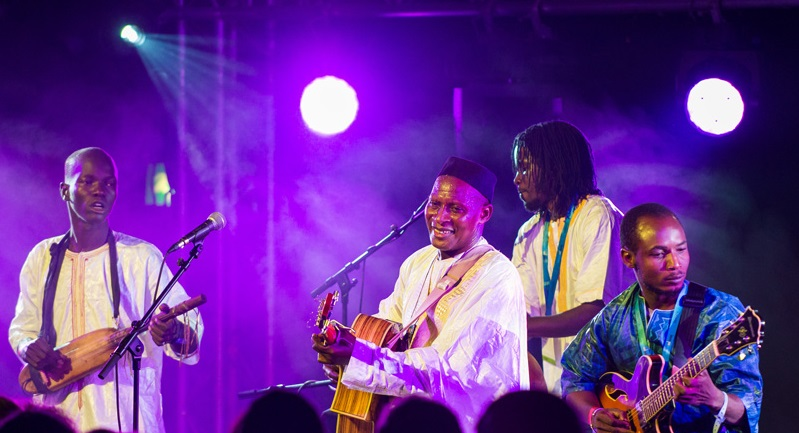
- Touré performing in 2013
- Born: January 1, 1959 (age 67); Gao, Mali
- Occupation: Singer/songwriter

Sidi Touré (born 1959, Gao, Mali) is a singer/songwriter from Bamako, Mali. His music is a type of songhaï blues. He started his career in the Sonhaï Stars, a regional orchestra. In 1984, he won the award of best singer with a song of his own hand at a Mali National Biennale. He won the same prize again in 1986. In 1992, he collaborated with Kassemady Diabaté.

== Discography ==
- Hoga, 1996, Stern's Records
- Sahel Folk, 2011, Thrill Jockey Records
- Koïma, 2012, Thrill Jockey Records
- Alafia, 2013
- Toubalbero, 2018
- Afrik Toun Mé, 2020, Thrill Jockey Records
