= Philip J. Thomas =

- Born: March 26, 1921 (age 105); Victoria, British Columbia, Canada
- Died: January 26, 2007 (aged 85)
- Genre: folk
- Occupations: teacher, musician, folklorist
- Instrument: guitar

Philip James Thomas (March 26, 1921 – January 26, 2007) was a Canadian teacher, musician and folklorist.

== Military ==
Born in Victoria, British Columbia, Canada, Thomas entered the RCAF near the outbreak of World War II. With the Air Force, he was engaged in development of Canada’s radar technology. He saw service in Europe and India.

== Teaching ==
After World War II on discharge from the RCAF, Thomas returned to BC. He studied education at the University of British Columbia. His first teaching assignment in 1949 was in Pender Harbour. Through contact with local residents he developed an interest in folklore and storytelling through song. In 1953 he was hired by the Vancouver School Board as an art teacher. In 1964-65, he was principal of The New School, a private, progressive school in East Vancouver.

== Archivist ==
Thomas developed his own philosophy of children’s art education that “honoured the child and how the child makes art.” In 1959 he co-founded the Vancouver Folk Song Circle (later the Vancouver Folk Song Society), which became a vehicle to collect additional material. The Song Circle is the oldest folk music society in Canada.

His 1979 book, Songs of the Pacific Northwest, is “of particular interest because it is the first sizeable collection of Canadian songs from anywhere west of Ontario”.

== Music ==
He played both guitar and banjo, and he and his wife Hilda Thomas (1928–2005) often performed together at folk festivals in British Columbia and western Canada.

== Publications ==
- Cariboo Wagon Road 1858-1868 (1964)
- Songs of the Pacific Northwest (1979; second revised and expanded edition, 2006)
- Twenty-Five Songs for Vancouver 1886-1986 (1985)
- "Both “Stanley G. Triggs”: A Recollection" Canadian Folklore Bulletin, 1996

== Recordings ==
- Phil Thomas and Friends: Live at Folklife Expo 86
- Where the Fraser River Flows and other Songs of the Pacific Northwest
- The Young Man from Canada: B.C. Songs from the P.J. Thomas Collection (performed by Jon Bartlett and Rika Ruebsaat)

== Honours and awards ==
- G.A. Ferguson Prize, from the B.C. Teachers Federation
- Honorary Life Member of the B.C. Art Teachers Association
- Honorary President and Life Member of the Canadian Society for Traditional Music
- Marius Barbeau Award
