= Leonard Sumner =

- Origin: Little Saskatchewan First Nation, Canadian
- Genres: country, folk, hip hop
- Spouse: Tasha Spillett-Sumner
- Website: leonardsumner.com

Leonard Sumner is an Anishinaabe singer-songwriter from Canada, whose music blends aspects of country, folk and hip-hop music.

== Music career ==
He is most noted for his 2018 album Standing in the Light, which received a Juno Award nomination for Indigenous Music Album of the Year at the Juno Awards of 2019.

He released his debut album Rez Poetry in 2013, and followed up with Standing in the Light in 2018.

== Awards and nominations ==
Year	Award	Category	Nominee/Work	Result	Ref
2019	Juno Award	Indigenous Music Album of the Year	Standing in the Light	Nominated	

== Personal life ==
A member of the Little Saskatchewan First Nation in Manitoba, Sumner has been based in Winnipeg since 2011. He is married to writer Tasha Spillett-Sumner. She gave birth to their daughter, Isabella, in March 2020.
