= Juno Awards of 2025 =

Canadian music awards ceremony

- The Juno Awards Logo
- Date: March 30, 2025
- Location: Rogers Arena; Vancouver, British Columbia
- Hosted by: Michael Bublé
- Most awards: Tate McRae (4)
- Most nominations: Josh Ross and Tate McRae (5)
- Website: junoawards.ca

Television/radio coverage
- Network: CBC; CBC Gem

The Juno Awards of 2025 were held on March 30, 2025, at Rogers Arena in Vancouver, British Columbia, to honour achievements in Canadian music in 2024. The ceremony was hosted by Michael Bublé.

Nominees were announced on February 11, 2025. Josh Ross and Tate McRae were the most nominated artists, with five nominations each. Tate McRae was the most awarded artist of the night, winning 4 out of the 5 awards she was nominated for.

== Category changes ==
The lead-up to the 2025 awards was marked by controversy in 2024 when media began to report that the Juno committee were planning to discontinue several categories, including Reggae Recording of the Year, Children's Album of the Year, Contemporary Christian/Gospel Album of the Year and International Album of the Year. The proposal was heavily criticized, on the grounds that as lower-profile genres their attention from the Juno Awards was an essential component of their viability, with reggae musicians in particular also noting that the elimination of a category for a predominantly Black genre of music rang "alarms of racism".

The award committee backtracked on the decision eight days after it was first reported. They ultimately retained all of the genre categories, pulling only the International Album of the Year category, while also adding new categories for South Asian music and non-performing songwriters.

== Performances ==
Rock band Sum 41 was inducted into the Canadian Music Hall of Fame, with their last-ever performance taking place at the Juno Awards ceremony following the conclusion of their farewell tour in January.

Other artists who performed at the ceremony included host Michael Buble, Josh Ross, Snotty Nose Rez Kids, Nemahsis, Aqyila and Tia Wood. A second round of performers was announced in March 2025, which included Elisapie, Jonita Gandhi, Maestro Fresh Wes, Roxane Bruneau, bbno$ with Priyanka, Peach Pit, Chani Nattan, Inderpal Moga, Jazzy B and Gminxr.

== Special awards ==
In addition to Sum 41's induction into the Hall of Fame, Anne Murray received a special Lifetime Achievement Award, while producer Boi-1da received an international achievement award. Singer-songwriter Sarah Harmer was presented with the Juno Humanitarian Award.

== Presenters ==
- bbno$ - presented Group of the Year
- Rueben George - introduced Snotty Nose Rez Kids
- Luisana Lopilato and Michael Bublé - presented MusiCounts Teacher of the Year
- Allan Hawco and Anna Lambe - presented Country Album of the Year
- Jessie Reyez - presented International Achievement Award
- Georges St-Pierre and Michael Bublé - introduced Josh Ross
- Joel Madden and Benji Madden - presented Canadian Music Hall of Fame
- Christine Sinclair and Quinn - introduced Aqyila
- DijahSB and Klô Pelgag - presented Breakthrough Artist or Group of the Year
- Sarah McLachlan - presented Lifetime Achievement Award
- The Beaches - presented Fan Choice Award
- Max Kerman and Michael Bublé - introduced Sum 41

== Winners and nominees ==
=== People ===
Artist of the Year	Group of the Year
Tate McRae; Kaytranada; Shawn Mendes; Josh Ross; The Weeknd	The Beaches; Crash Adams; Mother Mother; Spiritbox; Sum 41
Songwriter of the Year	Songwriter (Non-Performing) of the Year
Mustafa — "Name of God", "Leaving Toronto", "I'll Go Anywhere"; AP Dhillon — "Old Money", "Losing Myself", "Bora Bora"; Nemahsis — "stick of gum", "you wore it better", "coloured concrete"; Jessie Reyez — "Child of Fire", "Ridin", "Shut Up"; The Weeknd — "Dancing in the Flames", "Timeless", "São Paulo"	Lowell — "Texas Hold 'Em" (Beyoncé), "Bodyguard" (Beyoncé), "Takes One to Know One" (The Beaches); Evan Blair — "Beautiful Things" (Benson Boone), "Pretty Slowly" (Benson Boone), "i hope i never fall in love" (Maren Morris); Nathan Ferraro — "Texas Hold 'Em" (Beyoncé), "Smoke" (Ari Lennox), "Who Do I Call Now? (Hellbent)" (Sofia Camara); Shaun Frank — "Love Somebody" (Morgan Wallen), "Training Season" (Dua Lipa), "Sideways" (Gordo); Tobias Jesso Jr. — "Houdini" (Dua Lipa), "push me over" (Maren Morris), "Come Show Me" (Camila Cabello)
Producer of the Year	Recording Engineer of the Year
Jack Rochon — "II Hands II Heaven" (Beyoncé), "Protector" (Beyoncé), "Jolene" (Beyoncé), "My Way" (Charlotte Day Wilson), "Crash" (Kehlani), "Tears" (Kehlani); Evan Blair — "Pretty Slowly" (Benson Boone), "Beautiful Things" (Benson Boone), "club heaven" (Nessa Barrett), "No High" (David Kushner), "this is how a woman leaves" (Maren Morris), "i hope i never fall in love" (Maren Morris); Shawn Everett — "II Most Wanted" (Beyoncé), "Found Heaven" (Conan Gray), "Bright Lights" (The Killers), "I Don't" (Brittany Howard), "Eye of the Night" (Conan Gray), "Prove It to You" (Brittany Howard); Akeel Henry — "Spin" (Megan Thee Stallion), "Smoke" (Ari Lennox), "Shake" (Chlöe), "Oh, Wait…" (Shae Universe), "I Choose You" (Melanie Fiona), "Love Ain't Guaranteed" (Mist); Aaron Paris — "intro (end of the world)" (Ariana Grande), "Bought the Earth" (Yeat), "Let it Breathe" (Ski Mask the Slump God), "Tiger Eye" (Loony), "Dishonored" (Sean Leon and Jessie Reyez, "R e a l W o m a n" (PartyNextDoor)	Serban Ghenea — "Please Please Please" (Sabrina Carpenter), "Lose Control" (Teddy Swims); Shawn Everett — "Don't Forget Me" (Maggie Rogers), "Deeper Well" (Kacey Musgraves); Hill Kourkoutis — "Ghost" (Sebastian Gaskin), "Should We" (Emi Jeen); Mitch McCarthy — "Good Luck, Babe!" (Chappell Roan), "Make You Mine" (Madison Beer); George Seara — "Soft Spot" (Keshi), "Dream" (Keshi)
Breakthrough Artist or Group of the Year	Fan Choice Award
Nemahsis; Tony Ann; AP Dhillon; Chris Grey; ekkstacy; AR Paisley; Owen Riegling; Alexander Stewart; Sukha; Zeina	bbno$; Karan Aujla; Dean Brody; Les Cowboys Fringants; Jade Eagleson; Josh Ross; Tate McRae; Shawn Mendes; Preston Pablo; The Weeknd

=== Albums ===
Album of the Year	Adult Alternative Album of the Year
Tate McRae, Think Later; Roxane Bruneau, Submergé; Elisapie, Inuktitut; Josh Ross, Complicated; Sukha, Undisputed	Elisapie, Inuktitut; Terra Lightfoot, Healing Power; The Secret Beach, We Were Born Here, What's Your Excuse?; Leif Vollebekk, Revelation; Wild Rivers, Never Better
Adult Contemporary Album of the Year	Alternative Album of the Year
Maïa Davies, Lovers' Gothic; Aphrose, Roses; Celeigh Cardinal, Boundless Possibilities; Kellie Loder, Transitions; Maddee Ritter, Songs of Love and Death	Nemahsis, Verbathim; Luna Li, When a Thought Grows Wings; Peach Pit, Magpie; Ruby Waters, What's the Point; Valley, Water the Flowers, Pray for a Garden
Blues Album of the Year	Children's Album of the Year
Big Dave McLean, This Old Life; Blue Moon Marquee, New Orleans Sessions; Sue Foley, One Guitar Woman; David Gogo, Yeah!; Samantha King and the Midnight Outfit, Samantha King and the Midnight Outfit	Raffi and The Good Lovelies, Penny Penguin; Kym Gouchie, Shun Beh Nats'ujeh: We Are Healing Through Songs; Riley Rocket and MegaBlast, Riley Rocket: Songs from Season One; Walk Off the Earth and Romeo Eats, Buon Appetito; Young Maestro, Maestro Fresh Wes Presents: Young Maestro "Rhyme Travellers"
Classical Album of the Year – Solo	Classical Album of the Year – Large Ensemble
Emily D'Angelo, Freezing; Angèle Dubeau, Signature Phillip Glass; James Ehnes, Williams Violin Concerto No. 1: Bernstein Serenade; India Gailey, Butterfly Lightning Shakes the Earth; Barbara Hannigan, Messaien	Toronto Symphony Orchestra conducted by Gustavo Gimeno featuring Marc-André Hamelin and Nathalie Forget, Messiaen: Turangalîla-Symphonie; Mark Fewer featuring Aiyun Huang, Deantha Edmunds and Mark Fewer, Alikeness, Newfoundland Symphony Orchestra Sinfonia; Luminous Voices, Ispiciwin; Orchestre Métropolitain conducted by Yannick Nézet-Séguin, Sibelius 2 & 5; Montreal Symphony Orchestra conducted by Rafael Payare, Schoenberg: Pelleas und Melisande & Verklärte Nacht
Classical Album of the Year – Small Ensemble	Comedy Album of the Year
collectif9, Rituæls; Canadian Art Song Project, Known to Dreamers: Black Voices in Canadian Art Song; Karina Gauvin, Marie Hubert: Fille du Roy; Infusion Baroque, East Is East; St. John–Mercer–Park Trio, Kevin Lau: Under a Veil of Stars	Debra DiGiovanni, Honourable Intentions; Ivan Decker, Popcorn; Courtney Gilmour, Wonder Woman; Nathan Macintosh, Down with Tech; Jess Salomon, Sad Witch
Contemporary Indigenous Artist of the Year	Traditional Indigenous Artist of the Year
Sebastian Gaskin, Brown Man; Celeigh Cardinal, Boundless Possibilities; Snotty Nose Rez Kids, Red Future; Adrian Sutherland, Precious Diamonds; Tia Wood, Pretty Red Bird	Black Bear Singers, New Comings; Cree Confederation, Traveling Home; Brianna Lizotte, Winston & I; Northern Cree, REZilience; Young Spirit, Ostesihtowin/Brotherhood
Contemporary Roots Album of the Year	Traditional Roots Album of the Year
Kaia Kater, Strange Medicine; Boy Golden, For Eden; Abigail Lapell, Anniversary; Julian Taylor, Pathways; Donovan Woods, Things Were Never Good if They're Not Good Now	Jake Vaadeland, Retro Man ... More and More; La Bottine Souriante, Domino!; Inn Echo, Hemispheres; Loreena McKennitt, The Road Back Home (Live); Sylvia Tyson, At the End of the Day
Contemporary Christian/Gospel Album of the Year	Country Album of the Year
Ryan Ofei, Restore; Elenee, Elenee; Jordan St. Cyr, My Foundation; Tehillah Worship, Miracle in the Making; Toronto Mass Choir, Hymns Alive (Live)	Josh Ross, Complicated; Brett Kissel, The Compass Project: West Album; Tyler Joe Miller, Going Home; Mackenzie Porter, Nobody's Born with a Broken Heart; Dallas Smith, Dallas Smith
Electronic Album of the Year	Francophone Album of the Year
Priori, This But More; Caribou, Honey; Ebony, Union; Fred Everything, Love Care Kindness & Hope; Kaytranada, Timeless	Klô Pelgag, Abracadabra; Les Cowboys Fringants, Pub Royal; Fredz, Demain il fera beau; Aliocha Schneider, Aliocha Schneider; Jay Scott, Toutes les rues sont silencieuses
Global Music Album of the Year	Instrumental Album of the Year
Djely Tapa, Dankoroba; Ramon Chicharron, Niebla; Didon, Malak; Ahmed Moneka, Kanzafula; Abby V, Aarambh	Intervals, Memory Palace; Eric Bearclaw, Distant Places; Disaster Pony, Disaster Pony; Ginger Beef, Ginger Beef; Lara Wong and Melón Jimenez, Confluencias
Jazz Album of the Year – Solo	Jazz Album of the Year – Group
André Leroux, Montreal Jazz Series 1 (Échanges Synaptiques); Jocelyn Gould, Portrait of Right Now; Mark Kelso, The Antrim Coast; Larnell Lewis, Slice of Life; Audrey Ochoa, The Head of a Mouse	Jeremy Ledbetter Trio, Gravity; Andy Milne and Unison, Time Will Tell; Carn Davidson 9, Reverence; Christine Jensen Jazz Orchestra, Harbour; Raagaverse, Jaya
Vocal Jazz Album of the Year	Metal/Hard Music Album of the Year
Caity Gyorgy, Hello! How Are You?; Laila Biali, Wintersongs; Kellylee Evans, Winter Song; Sarah Jerrom, Magpie; Andrea Superstein, Oh Mother	Anciients, Beyond the Reach of the Sun; Kittie, Fire; Spiritbox, The Fear of Fear; Striker, Ultrapower; Devin Townsend, PowerNerd
Pop Album of the Year	Rap Album/EP of the Year
Tate McRae, Think Later; Jamie Fine, If This Is It…; Shawn Mendes, Shawn; Preston Pablo, Anywhere But Here; Alexander Stewart, Bleeding Heart	Snotty Nose Rez Kids, Red Future; Belly, 96 Miles from Bethlehem; Classified, Luke's View; DijahSB, The Flower That Knew; Dom Vallie, See You When I See You
Rock Album of the Year
Nobro, Set Your Pussy Free; Big Wreck, Pages; Mother Mother, Grief Chapter; Sum 41, Heaven :x: Hell; JJ Wilde, Vices

=== Songs and recordings ===
Single of the Year	Classical Composition of the Year
Tate McRae, "Exes"; Karan Aujla, "Winning Speech"; Shawn Mendes, "Why Why Why"; Josh Ross, "Single Again"; The Weeknd and Playboi Carti, "Timeless"	Deantha Edmunds, "Angmalukisaa"; Keiko Devaux, "L'écoute du perdu : III. « Voix jetées »"; Gabriel Dharmoo, "The Fog in Our Poise"; Vivian Fung, "String Quartet No. 4: Insects and Machines"; Linda Catlin Smith, "Dark Flower"
Dance Recording of the Year	Rap Single of the Year
Interplanetary Criminal feat. SadBoi, "No Time"; DijahSB, "Uh Huh"; Rezz, Virtual Riot feat. One True God, "Give in to you"; So Sus, "Call Me When"; Wawa, "Foul Taste"	Jessie Reyez featuring Big Sean, "Shut Up"; Classified, "People"; Haviah Mighty, "Double the Fun"; Snotty Nose Rez Kids, "BBE"; Souldia feat. Lost, "Hier encore"
Contemporary R&B/Soul Recording of the Year	Traditional R&B/Soul Recording of the Year
Aqyila, Bloom; Avenoir, Noire; Loony, Loony; Dylan Sinclair, "For the Boy in Me"; Zeina, Eastend Confessions	TheHonestGuy, Velvet Soul; Aqyila, Limbo; Benita, The Worst; Luna Elle, Halfway Broken; Charlotte Day Wilson, Cyan Blue
Reggae Recording of the Year	South Asian Music Recording of the Year
Exco Levi, Born to Be Free; King Cruff and Runkus, Fall Back; Tonya P, Rise; Lee Scratch Perry and Bob Riddim, Destiny; Skystar, Sky's the Limit	AP Dhillon, The Brownprint; Karan Aujla, Tauba Tauba; Jonita Gandhi, Love Like That; Chani Nattan, Inderpal Moga and Jazzy B, Coolin; Yanchan Produced and Sandeep Narayan, Arul
Underground Dance Single of the Year
Ciel, "Bamboo"; Hicky & Kalo and Hernan Cattaneo, "Distant Memories"; Destrata, "Keepsake"; Jesse Mac Cormack, Charlie Houston and Brö, "La Vérité"; Suray Sertin, "WTP"

=== Other ===
Album Artwork of the Year	Video of the Year
Keenan Gregory — Altruistic, Royal Tusk; Erik M. Grice, Vanessa Elizabeth Heins — Chandler, Wyatt C. Louis; Gabriel Noel Altrows — Good Kid 4, Good Kid; Kee Avil, Jacqueline Beaumont, Fatine-Violette Sabiri — Spine, Kee Avil; Kevin Hearn, Lauchlan Reid, Antoine Jean Moonen — Basement Days, The Glacials	Mustafa — Mustafa, "Name of God"; Jonah Haber — Tinashe, "Nasty"; Winston Hacking — Corridor, "Jump Cut"; Jorden Lee — Sean Leon, "Gravity"; Adrian Villagomez — Apashe & Wasiu, "Human"
MusiCounts Teacher of the Year
Jeannie Hunter, Nepean High School (Ottawa, ON); Greg Chomut, Dennis Franklin Cromarty High School (Thunder Bay, ON); Robert Colbourne, Holy Heart of Mary Regional High School (St. John's, NL); Emily Dominey, Dundas Valley Secondary School (Hamilton, ON); Drew Van Allen, Nakoda Elementary School (Mînî Thnî, AB)
