= Fawn Wood =

Indigenous Singer-Songwriter

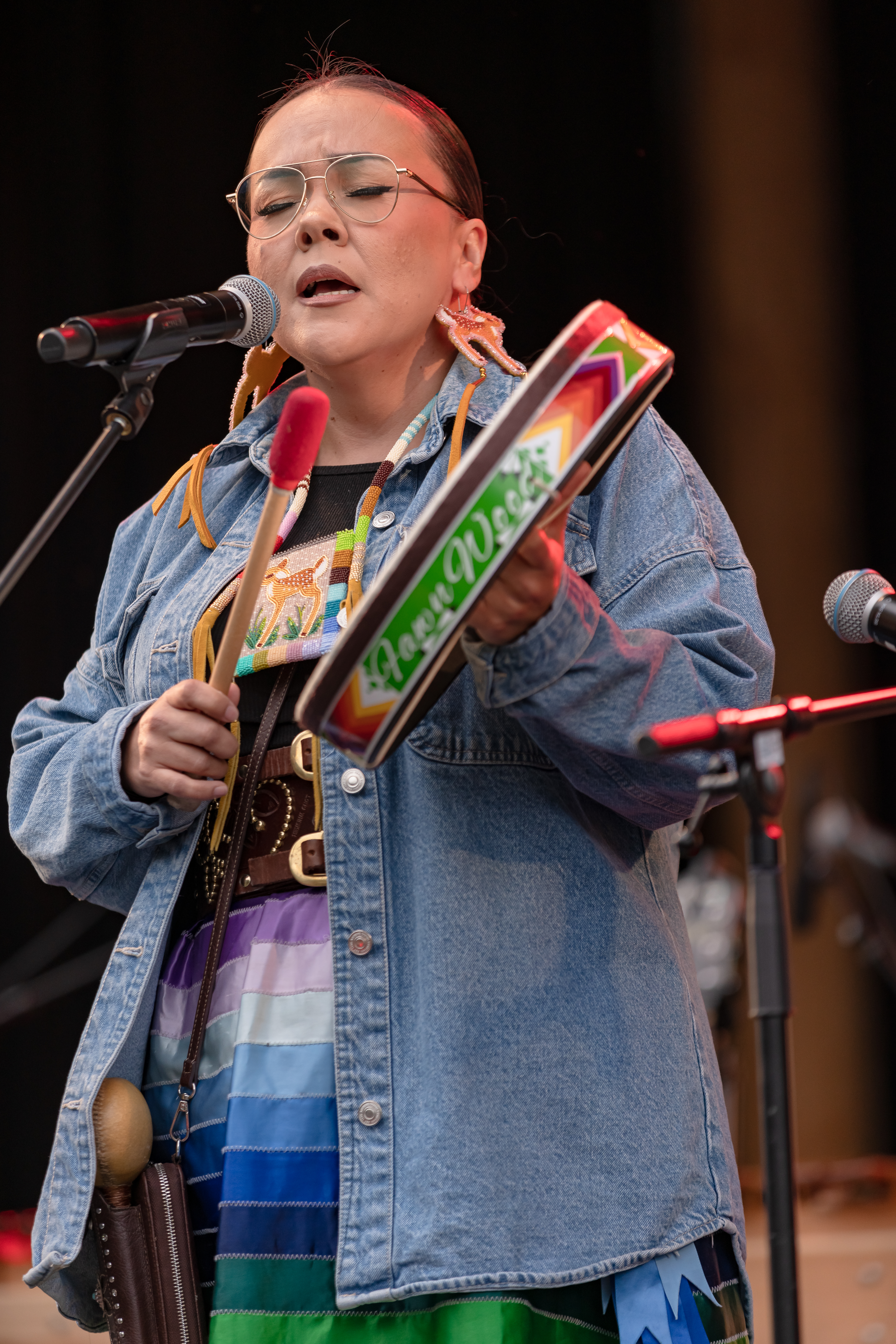

Background information
- Instruments: vocals; guitar; piano
- Label: Buffalo Jump Records
- Award: Juno Award for Traditional Indigenous Artist of the Year

Fawn Wood is a Cree and Salish musician from St. Paul, Alberta, Canada. She is most noted for her album Kakike, for which she won the Juno Award for Traditional Indigenous Artist of the Year at the Juno Awards of 2022.

She is the daughter of Earl Wood, a musician with the traditional Cree group Northern Cree, and the cousin of Joel Wood, a musician who was a fellow Juno nominee in the same category in 2022. Her younger sister Tia is also a singer, who signed to Sony Music in 2024 after gaining popularity performing on social networking platforms.

She studied the Cree language at Blue Quills University.

== Discography ==
=== Singles ===
Year	Single	Peak chart positions	Album
Year	Single	CAN Country	Album
2024	"Kakike"	60	Kâkike
"—" denotes releases that did not chart.
