= Juno Awards of 2023 =

Canadian music awards ceremony

- The Juno Awards Logo
- Date: 13 March 2023
- Location: Rogers Place; Edmonton, Alberta
- Hosted by: Simu Liu
- Most awards: The Weeknd (5)
- Most nominations: The Weeknd (6)
- Website: junoawards.ca

Television/radio coverage
- Network: CBC; CBC Gem

The Juno Awards of 2023 was a music awards ceremony that was held on 13 March 2023 at Rogers Place in Edmonton, Alberta. It recognized the best recordings, compositions, and artists of the eligibility year determined by the members of the Canadian Academy of Recording Arts and Sciences. It returned to its usual March schedule for the first time since 2019 after COVID-19 pandemic had the last three events took place in June 2020, May 2021, and May 2022, respectively. Canadian actor Simu Liu, who hosted the 2022 ceremony, returned to host again.

The Weeknd received the most nominations (six) and had the most wins (five), followed by Avril Lavigne and Tate McRae with five nominations each, and Reklaws, Shawn Mendes, Preston Pablo and Banx & Ranx with three nominations each. With the six nominations, The Weeknd matched his personal records for both 2016 and 2021.

During the televised show, a topless protester crashed Avril Lavigne's introduction of AP Dhillon.

== Background ==
The nominees for Rap Album or EP of the Year were announced 30 January on the premiere of Elamin Abdelmahmoud's new CBC Radio One talk show Commotion, followed by the remainder on 31 January 2023.

Most winners were announced at the "opening night" event on 11 March 2023, with only select high-profile categories reserved for the main ceremony on 13 March.

The ceremony had originally been scheduled for 12 March, but was rescheduled for the next day after the 95th Academy Awards were scheduled for that date.

== Performances ==
The first wave of performers for the ceremony were announced in early January with Tennille Townes, and AP Dhillon confirmed a few days later. The 50 Years of Hip Hop performance was announced on 3 March.

During the show's broadcast, Casey Hatherly walked topless onto the stage while Avril Lavigne was introducing AP Dhillon for his performance. Hatherly displayed slogans to protest climate-related causes, in particular issues surrounding the Greenbelt, before being escorted off the stage.

List of performers at the Juno Awards of 2023
Artist(s)	Song(s)
Tate McRae	"she's all I wanna be"
AP Dhillon	"Summer High"
Tenille Townes	"Where are You" "The Sound of Being Alone"
Alexisonfire	"Sans soleil"
Aysanabee with Northern Cree	"We Were Here (It's in My Blood)"
Bank & Ranx with Preston Pablo, Rêve	"Headphones" "Flowers Need Rain" "CTRL + ALT + DEL"
Jessie Reyez	"Mutual Friend"
Michie Mee with Kardinal Offishall Dream Warriors Choclair TOBi	50 Years of Hip-Hop "Jamaican Funk" "My Definition of a Bombastic Jazz Style" "Let's Ride" "Flowers"
Nickelback	"Rockstar" "How You Remind Me" "Animals"

== Winners and nominees ==
The following are the winners and nominees of the Juno Awards of 2023. Winners appear first and highlighted in bold.

=== People ===
Artist of the Year	Group of the Year
**The Weeknd**; Michael Bublé; Avril Lavigne; Shawn Mendes; Lauren Spencer-Smith	**Arkells**; Arcade Fire; Billy Talent; Metric; The Reklaws
Breakthrough Artist of the Year	Breakthrough Group of the Year
**Preston Pablo**; Dax; Devon Cole; RealestK; Rêve	**Banx & Ranx**; Harm & Ease; Rare Americans; Tommy Lefroy; Wild Rivers
Fan Choice Award	Songwriter of the Year
**Avril Lavigne**; Tate McRae; Shawn Mendes; Preston Pablo; Mackenzie Porter; The Reklaws; Rêve; Tyler Shaw; Lauren Spencer-Smith; The Weeknd	**Abel Tesfaye — "Less Than Zero", "Out of Time", "Sacrifice"**; Faouzia — "Anybody Else", "Puppet", "RIP, Love"; Tate McRae — "Chaotic", "Feel Like Shit", "She's All I Wanna Be"; Tenille Townes — "The Last Time", "When You Need It", "When's It Gonna Happen"; Tobi — "Before We Panic", "Flowers", "Move"
Producer of the Year	Recording Engineer of the Year
**Akeel Henry — "For Tonight" (Giveon), "Splash" (John Legend)**; Banx & Ranx — "Ctrl + Alt + Del" (Rêve), "Dynamite" (Sean Paul feat. Sia); Kaytranada — "dog food" (IDK), "Iced Tea" (Joyce Wrice and Kaytranada); Mike Wise — "10 Things I Hate About You" (Leah Kate), "Yuck" (Charli XCX); Murda Beatz — "California Breeze" (Lil Baby), "Have Mercy" (Chlöe)	**Serban Ghenea — "That's What I Want" (Lil Nas X), "Unholy" (Sam Smith feat. Kim Petras)**; Derek Hoffman — "My Body" (Lili-Ann De Francesco), "Stronger Than You Know" (The East Pointers); George Seara — "Hell/Heaven" (Keshi), "It'll Be Okay" (Shawn Mendes); Gus van Go — "Grow Up Tomorrow" (The Beaches), "What Feels Like Eternity" (Metric); Jason Dufour — "She Don't Know" (Jade Eagleson), "The Old Me" (Ria Mae)

=== Albums ===
Album of the Year	Adult Alternative Album of the Year
**The Weeknd, Dawn FM**; Ali Gatie, Who Hurt You?; Avril Lavigne, Love Sux; Tate McRae, I Used to Think I Could Fly; Nav, Demons Protected by Angels	**The Sadies, Colder Streams**; Altameda, Born Losers; Basia Bulat, The Garden; Dan Mangan, Being Somewhere; The Weather Station, How Is It That I Should Look at the Stars
Adult Contemporary Album of the Year	Alternative Album of the Year
**Michael Bublé, Higher**; Jann Arden, Descendant; Marc Jordan and Amy Sky, He Sang She Sang; Francois Klark, Adventure Book; Tyler Shaw, A Tyler Shaw Christmas	**Alvvays, Blue Rev**; Luna Li, Duality; OMBIIGIZI, Sewn Back Together; PUP, The Unraveling of PUPTheBand; Tanya Tagaq, Tongues
Blues Album of the Year	Children's Album of the Year
**Angelique Francis, Long River**; Harpoonist & The Axe Murderer, Live at the King Eddy; Harrison Kennedy, Thanks for Tomorrow; Spencer Mackenzie, Preach to My Soul; Crystal Shawanda, Midnight Blues	**Walk off the Earth and Romeo Eats, Walk off the Earth and Romeo Eats, Vol. 2**; Beppie, Nice to Meet You; Jeremy and Jazzy, Say Hello; Maestro Fresh Wes and Keysha Freshh, Maestro Fresh Wes Presents: Julia the Great; Splash'N Boots, I Am Love
Classical Album of the Year – Solo	Classical Album of the Year – Large Ensemble
**Philip Chiu, Fables**; Isabel Bayrakdarian, La Zingarella: Through Romany Songland; James Ehnes, Bach: Sonatas and Partitas for Solo Violin; David Jalbert, Prokofiev: Piano Sonatas; Bruce Liu, Winner of the 18th International Fryderyk Chopin Piano Competition Warsaw 2021	**Orchestre de l'Agora conducted by Nicolas Ellis featuring Marina Thibeault, Viola Borealis**; The Elora Singers conducted by Mark Vuorinen, Radiant Dawn: Music for Advent and Christmas; Ensemble Vocal Arts-Quebec conducted by Matthias Maute featuring Karina Gauvin, Handel: Messiah, HWV 56, Ensemble Caprice; I Musici de Montréal conducted by Jean-Marie Zeitouni, Richard Strauss: Metamorphosen – Arvo Pärt: Symphonie No. 4 Los Angeles; National Arts Centre Orchestra conducted by Alexander Shelley, Clara – Robert – Johannes: Lyrical Echoes
Classical Album of the Year – Small Ensemble	Contemporary Christian/Gospel Album of the Year
**Elinor Frey and Rosa Barocca conducted by Claude Lapalme, Early Italian Cello Concertos**; ARC Ensemble, Hemsi: Chamber Works; Andrew Balfour and Musica Intima, Nagamo; Collectif9, Vagues et ombres; Suzie LeBlanc, Marie Nadeau-Tremblay, Vincent Lauzer and Sylvain Bergeron, De la cour de Louis XIV à Shippagan! Chants traditionnels acadiens et airs de cour du XVIIe siècle	**Jordan St. Cyr, Jordan St. Cyr**; Dan Bremnes, Into the Wild; Daniel Ojo, Trust; Love and the Outcome, Only Ever Always; Tehillah Worship, The Church Will Rise
Contemporary Indigenous Artist of the Year	Traditional Indigenous Artist of the Year
**Digging Roots, Zhawenim**; Susan Aglukark, The Crossing; Aysanabee, Watin; Indian City, Code Red; Julian Taylor, Beyond the Reservoir	**The Bearhead Sisters, Unbreakable**; Cikwes, Kâkîsimo ᑳᑮᓯᒧᐤ; Iva and Angu, Katajjausiit; Northern Cree, Ôskimacîtahowin: A New Beginning; Joel Wood, Mikwanak Kamôsakinat
Country Album of the Year	Electronic Album of the Year
**Tenille Townes, Masquerades**; Jade Eagleson, Honkytonk Revival; High Valley, Way Back; Orville Peck, Bronco; The Reklaws, Good Ol' Days	**Teen Daze, Interior**; Rich Aucoin, Synthetic Season One; Mecha Maiko, Not OK; Odonis Odonis, Spectrums; Rezz, Nightmare on Rezz Street 2 Mix
Francophone Album of the Year	Instrumental Album of the Year
**Les Louanges, Crash**; Daniel Bélanger, Mercure en mai; Lisa Leblanc, Chiac Disco; Hubert Lenoir, PICTURA DE IPSE: Musique directe; Ariane Roy, Medium plaisir	**Esmerine, Everything Was Forever Until It Was No More**; Jean-Michel Blais, Aubades; The Canadian Brass, Canadiana; Hard Rubber Orchestra, Iguana; Stephan Moccio, Lionheart
International Album of the Year	Jazz Album of the Year – Solo
**Harry Styles, Harry's House**; Lil Nas X, Montero; Ed Sheeran, =; Taylor Swift, Midnights; Taylor Swift, Red (Taylor's Version)	**Renee Rosnes, Kinds of Love**; Ernesto Cervini, Joy; Luis Deniz, El Tinajon; Lauren Falls, A Little Louder Now; Rafael Zaldivar, Rumba
Jazz Album of the Year – Group	Vocal Jazz Album of the Year
**Florian Hoefner Trio, Desert Bloom**; Andrew Rathbun Quintet, Semantics; BadBadNotGood, Talk Memory; Carn Davidson 9, The History of Us; Mark Kelso and the Jazz Exiles, The Dragon's Tail	**Caity Gyorgy, Featuring**; Laura Anglade and Sam Kirmayer, Venez donc chez moi; The Ostara Project, The Ostara Project; Diana Panton, Blue; Nikki Yanofsky, Nikki by Starlight
Metal/Hard Music Album of the Year	Pop Album of the Year
**Voivod, Synchro Anarchy**; Cancer Bats, Psychic Jailbreak; Get the Shot, Merciless Destruction; Skull Fist, Paid in Full; Wake, Thought Form Descent	**The Weeknd, Dawn FM**; Alessia Cara, In the Meantime; Carly Rae Jepsen, The Loneliest Time; Avril Lavigne, Love Sux; Tate McRae, I Used to Think I Could Fly
Rap Album/EP of the Year	Rock Album of the Year
**Tobi, Shall I Continue?**; Boslen, Gonzo; Classified, Retrospected (Acoustic); Jazz Cartier, The Fleur Print (Vol. 2); Nav, Demons Protected by Angels	**Alexisonfire, Otherness**; Billy Talent, Crisis of Faith; Nickelback, Get Rollin'; The Sheepdogs, Outta Sight; Three Days Grace, Explosions
Contemporary Roots Album of the Year	Traditional Roots Album of the Year
**The Bros. Landreth, Come Morning**; Blackie and the Rodeo Kings, O Glory; The East Pointers, House of Dreams; Fortunate Ones, That Was You and Me; Shakura S'Aida, Hold On to Love	**Pharis and Jason Romero, Tell 'em You were Gold**; Allison de Groot and Tatiana Hargreaves, Hurricane Clarice; Mama's Broke, Narrow Line; The McDades, The Empress; Le Vent du Nord, 20 printemps
Global Music Album of the Year	Comedy Album of the Year
**Lenka Lichtenberg, Thieves of Dreams**; Ghalia Benali, Constantinople and Kiya Tabassian, In the Footsteps of Rumi; Pierre Kwenders, José Louis and the Paradox of Love; Ruby Singh, Vox.Infold; Wesli, Tradisyon	**Jon Dore, A Person Who Is Gingerbread**; Zabrina Douglas, Things Black Girls Say: The Album; Courtney Gilmour, Let Me Hold Your Baby; Jackie Pirico, Splash Pad; Matt Wright, Here Live, Not a Cat

=== Songs and recordings ===
Single of the Year	Classical Composition of the Year
**The Weeknd, "Sacrifice"**; Avril Lavigne, "Bite Me"; Tate McRae, "She's All I Wanna Be"; Shawn Mendes, "When You're Gone"; Preston Pablo feat. Banx & Ranx, "Flowers Need Rain"	**Bekah Simms, "Bestiary I & II"**; Anthony Tan, "An Overall Augmented Sense of Well-Being"; Keyan Emami, "The Black Fish"; Nicole Lizée, "Prayers for Ruins"; Vincent Ho, "Supervillain Études"
Dance Recording of the Year	Rap Single of the Year
**Rêve, "Ctrl + Alt + Del"**; Bob Moses feat. Kasablanca, "Afterglow"; Grimes, "Shinigami Eyes"; Loud Luxury feat. Kiddo, "These Nights"; Rezz, Spiral	**Kaytranada feat. Anderson .Paak, "Twin Flame"**; 6ixbuzz and Pengz, "Alejandro Sosa"; Dom Vallie, "Been Himma"; Freddie Dredd, "Wrath"; Nav, "Wrong Decisions"
Contemporary R&B/Soul Recording of the Year	Traditional R&B/Soul Recording of the Year
**Jessie Reyez, Yessie**; dvsn, If I Get Caught; Adria Kain, When Flowers Bloom; Savannah Ré, WTF; Dylan Sinclair, No Longer in the Suburbs	**Savannah Ré feat. Dylan Sinclair, "Last One"**; Daniel Caesar feat. BadBadNotGood, "Please Do Not Lean"; Jon Vinyl, Palisade; Safe, "All I Need"; TheHonestGuy, How to Make Love
Reggae Recording of the Year	Underground Dance Single of the Year
**Kirk Diamond feat. Kairo McLean and Finn, "Reggae Party"**; Ammoye, "Water"; Celena, "Like a Star"; Exco Levi, "Jah Love"; Kairo McLean, "In the Streets"	**Greg Gow, "I Knew Techno"**; Bensley, "Debonair"; Blond:ish feat. Cameron Jack, "Aye Aye"; Fred Everything, "The Time Is (Now)"; Tiga, "Easy"

=== Other ===
Album Artwork of the Year	Video of the Year
**Ian Ilavsky (art director and designer), Maciek Szczerbowski (illustrator) — Everything Was Forever Until It Was No More, Esmerine**; Emy Storey (art director, designer, photographer), Becca McFarlane and Pamela Littky (photographers) — Crybaby, Tegan and Sara; Jud Haynes (art director, designer) — Kubasongs, Kubasonics; Kee Avil (art director), Lawrence Fafard (photographer) — Crease, Kee Avil; Lights (art director, illustrator), Virgilio Tzaj (designer), Matt Barnes (photographer) — PEP, Lights	**Floria Sigismondi — "Unholy" (Sam Smith and Kim Petras)**; Emma Higgins — "Fraud" (Jessie Reyez); Karena Evans — "Have Mercy" (Chlöe); Mayumi Yoshida — "Different Than Before" (Amanda Sum); Sterling Larose — "Remember Me for Me" (SonReal and Lily Moore)
MusiCounts Teacher of the Year
**Jewel Casselman, Lakewood School, Winnipeg, MB**; Susan Avoy, St. Teresa’s Elementary & Waterford Valley High School, St. John's, NL; Stephen Richardson, École St. Joseph, Yellowknife, NT; Kelly Stronach, Mitchell Woods Public School, Guelph, ON; Heidi Wood, Joane Cardinal-Schubert High School, Calgary, AB

== Special awards ==
CARAS announced Nickelback as the 2023 inductee into the Canadian Music Hall of Fame presented by Edmonton Oilers captain Connor McDavid, and music manager Ron Sakamoto as the recipient of the Walt Grealis Special Achievement Award.

== Multiple nominations and awards ==
The following received multiple nominations:

Six:

- The Weeknd

Five:

- Avril Lavigne
- Tate McRae

Three:

- Reklaws
- Shawn Mendes
- Preston Pablo
- Banx & Ranx

The following received multiple awards:

Five:

- The Weeknd
