= Brianna Lizotte =

Métis fiddler

Brianna Lizotte is a Métis Canadian fiddle player based in Edmonton, Alberta, who received a Juno Award nomination for Traditional Indigenous Artist of the Year at the Juno Awards of 2025 for her album Winston & I.

Born and raised in Sylvan Lake, she attended high school in Red Deer. She released her debut album, Scratch 'Em, in 2018 before studying music at MacEwan University, where she graduated in 2023. At MacEwan she discovered an interest in jazz, and incorporated some big band jazz elements into Winston & I.

Winston & I was named in honour of Cree musician and educator Winston Wuttunee, with much of the album played on a fiddle Wuttunee previously owned.
