= Young Scouts =

Canadian musical group

Young Scouts is a Cree musical group from Saskatchewan, who received a Juno Award nomination for Traditional Indigenous Artist of the Year at the Juno Awards of 2024.

The group consists of several musicians from various communities in Treaty 6 territories, including the Little Pine First Nation, the Sweetgrass First Nation, the Enoch Cree Nation, the Sturgeon Lake First Nation, the Ministikwan Lake Cree Nation and the Muskoday First Nation. They perform traditional indigenous round dance music, including drumming and group vocals.
