= Juno Award for Underground Dance Single of the Year =

Canadian music award

The Juno Award for Underground Dance Single of the Year is an annual Canadian music award, presented by the Juno Awards to honour songs in underground dance music genres. Announced at the Juno Awards of 2021, it was presented for the first time at the Juno Awards of 2022.

The award was created as a split from the existing Juno Award for Dance Recording of the Year, because the existing award is often dominated by commercial dance pop singles while leaving more underground and experimental dance music, such as music created by Black Canadian, First Nations or LGBTQ artists, underrepresented.

Qualifying recordings may feature “slow builds, hypnotic and repetitive arrangements that may include vocals, often extended in length, all developed for maximum utility on the dance floor by club DJs."

== Winners and nominees ==
Year	Winner	Album	Nominees	Ref.
2022	HNTR feat. Elliot Moss	"Shadows in the Dark"	Blond:ish feat. Grace Tither, "Waves"; Carlo Lio feat. MC Flipside, "Hood Shit"; Jayda G, "All I Need (DJ-Kicks)"; Korea Town Acid, "Sobriety"	
2023	Greg Gow	"I Knew Techno"	Bensley, "Debonair"; Blond:ish feat. Cameron Jack, "Aye Aye"; Fred Everything, "The Time Is (Now)"; Tiga, "Easy"	
2024	Blond:ish	"Call My Name"	DJ Karaba, "Mad Mess"; LostBoyJay, "Could Be Wrong"; Peach, "Eclipse"; Smalltown DJs, "Concorde Groove"	
2025	Ciel	"Bamboo"	Hernan Cattaneo, Hicky & Kalo, "Distant Memories"; Destrata, "Keepsake"; Jesse Mac Cormack, Charlie Houston and Brö, "La Vérité"; Suray Sertin, "WTP"	
2026	Gene Tellem feat. Teddy Bryant	"Phantom Vibrations"	AADJA, "Cosmic Affliction (toi toi toi)"; Annie-Claude Deschênes, "Main de fer"; F7, "Icarus"; Pacific Coliseum, "Yeah!"	
