= Juno Award for Rap Album/EP of the Year =

Canadian music award

The Juno Award for Rap Album or EP of the Year is an annual Canadian music award, presented by the Juno Awards to honour full-length releases by Canadian hip hop artists. Announced at the Juno Awards of 2021, it was presented for the first time at the Juno Awards of 2022.

The award is presented alongside a new category for Rap Single of the Year.

Until 2022, albums and individual songs were considered together under the single Rap Recording of the Year category. The changes were announced to coincide with the 30th anniversary of the creation of the Junos rap category.

== Winners and nominees ==
Year	Winner	Album	Nominees	Ref.
2022	Haviah Mighty	Stock Exchange	Belly, See You Next Wednesday; Nav, Emergency Tsunami; NorthSideBenji, The Extravagant Collection; Pressa, Gardner Express (Deluxe)	
2023	TOBi	Shall I Continue?	Boslen, Gonzo; Classified, Retrospected (Acoustic); Jazz Cartier, The Fleur Print (Vol. 2); Nav, Demons Protected by Angels	
2024	TOBi	Panic	bbno$, bag or die; Haviah Mighty, Crying Crystals; Kaytraminé, Kaytraminé; Connor Price, Spin the Globe	
2025	Snotty Nose Rez Kids	Red Future	Belly, 96 Miles from Bethlehem; Classified, Luke's View; DijahSB, The Flower That Knew; Dom Vallie, See You When I See You	
2026	SadBoi	Dry Cry	Ardn, Keep Your Eye on the Sparrow; NorthSideBenji, Misery Loves Company; Connor Price, About Time; Tobi, Elements Vol. 2	
