= Rueben George =

Canadian writer and activist

Rueben George is a Canadian writer and activist. He is most noted for It Stops Here: Standing Up for Our Lands, Our Waters, and Our People, a book co-written with Michael Simpson which was a shortlisted finalist for the City of Vancouver Book Award in 2024.

A member of the Tsleil-Waututh First Nation, he is the grandson of Chief Dan George. He has worked with the Tsleil-Waututh Nation Sacred Trust, an environmental and cultural organization that advocates for the protection of Tsleil-Waututh culture and traditions.

In 2024, he performed a spoken word monologue about Indigenous rights on "FREE", a song from the Snotty Nose Rez Kids album Red Future. The song was longlisted for the Polaris SOCAN Song Prize at the 2025 Polaris Music Prize, and George served as a presenter at the Juno Awards of 2025 to introduce the live performance by Snotty Nose Rez Kids and Tia Wood.

In 2026, George endorsed Avi Lewis in that year's federal NDP leadership race.
