= Nimkii and the Niniis =

Wiikwemkoong music group

Nimkii and the Niniis are a Canadian First Nations musical group from Wiikwemkoong, Ontario, whose debut EP Nang Giizhigoong was a Juno Award nominee for Traditional Indigenous Artist of the Year at the Juno Awards of 2022.

The band, led by Nimkii Osawamick, performed traditional Anishinabek drumming and choral singing on Nang Giizhigoong, although Osawamick has communicated an ambition to blend traditional indigenous music with contemporary pop styles in the future.
