= Dom Vallie =

Dom Vallie is the stage name of Dominic Turton, a Canadian rapper from Kitchener, Ontario. He has been a two-time Juno Award nominee, receiving nods for Rap Single of the Year at the Juno Awards of 2023 for his single "Been Himma", and Rap Album/EP of the Year at the Juno Awards of 2025 for See You When I See You.
