= Juno Award for Traditional Indigenous Artist of the Year =

Canadian music award

The Juno Award for Traditional Indigenous Artist of the Year is an annual Canadian music award, presented by the Juno Awards to honour music created by Indigenous Canadian artists working in traditional music genres. Announced at the Juno Awards of 2021, it was presented for the first time at the Juno Awards of 2022.

It is presented alongside a new category for Contemporary Indigenous Artist of the Year.

Prior to 2022, contemporary and traditional Indigenous artists were honoured alongside each other in a single category for Indigenous Artist or Group of the Year.

== Winners and nominees ==
Year	Winner	Album	Nominees	Ref.
2022	Fawn Wood	Kakike	Manitou Mkwa Singers, Manitou Mkwa Singers II; Nimkii and the Niniis, Nang Giizhigoong; Joel Wood, Singing Is Healing; Young Spirit, Angel Eagle: Cree Round Dance Songs	
2023	The Bearhead Sisters	Unbreakable	Cikwes, Kâkîsimo ᑳᑮᓯᒧᐤ; Iva and Angu, Katajjausiit; Northern Cree, Ôskimacîtahowin: A New Beginning; Joel Wood, Mikwanak Kamôsakinat	
2024	Joel Wood	Sing. Pray. Love.	The Bearhead Sisters, Mitòòdebi (For My Relatives); Nimkii and the Niniis, LFS5; The Red River Ramblers, Reverie; Young Scouts, Drum Nation	
2025	Black Bear Singers	New Comings	Cree Confederation, Traveling Home; Brianna Lizotte, Winston & I; Northern Cree, REZilience; Young Spirit, Ostesihtowin/Brotherhood	
2026	Bear Creek Singers	On the Move	Bad Eagle, Battle at the Beach; Manitou Mkwa Singers, Me & You; Piunguałaq, Anirniliit Suli; YB Nakota, Nakota Tayhunyabi	
