= Tia Wood =

Canadian pop singer-songwriter

- Born: Tia Wood; July 7, 1999 (age 27); Saddle Lake Cree Nation, Alberta, Canada
- Occupation: Singer-songwriter
- Years active: 2024–present
- Relatives: Fawn Wood (sister); Earl Wood (father); Cynthia Jim (mother)
- Musical career
- Origin: Saddle Lake Cree Nation, Alberta
- Genres: Pop; R&B; Indigenous
- Website: tiawood.ca

Tia Wood is a Cree and Salish pop singer-songwriter from Canada, who received a Juno Award nomination for Contemporary Indigenous Artist of the Year at the Juno Awards of 2025 for her EP Pretty Red Bird.

The daughter of Earl Wood of the Indigenous round dance group Northern Cree and the younger sister of singer Fawn Wood, she grew up in the Saddle Lake Cree Nation. Tia first launched into the public sphere and built a fan base on TikTok with short videos of her Indigenizing sounds. She was then signed to Sony Music Canada, being the first Indigenous woman to ever be signed to this label.

Pretty Red Bird, her debut EP, was released in September 2024 on Sony Music.

She has also been an activist with the REDress Project, which seeks to publicize the issue of Missing and Murdered Indigenous Women through art, dance and music.

In May 2026, Wood performed her song "Sage My Soul" as the musical background to the In Memoriam segment at the 14th Canadian Screen Awards.

== Discography ==
=== Extended plays ===
List of EPs, showing release date, label and formats
Title	Details
Pretty Red Bird	Released: September 27, 2024; Label: Sony; Formats: Digital download, streaming

=== Singles ===
==== As lead artist ====
List of singles as lead artist, showing year released, album name and selected chart positions
Title	Year	Peak positions		Album/EP
Title	Year	CAN CHR	CAN HAC	Album/EP
"Dirt Roads"	2024	—	—	Pretty Red Bird
"Losing Game"	2024	—	—	Pretty Red Bird
"Catch & Release"	2024	—	—	Pretty Red Bird
"Sky High"	2024	23	25	Pretty Red Bird
"Never Come Down"	2025	—	—	Non-album singles
"Sage My Soul"	2025	—	35	Non-album singles
"Stimulated"	2026	—	—	Non-album singles
"—" denotes a recording that did not chart or was not released in that territory.

==== As featured artist ====
List of singles as featured artist, showing year released and album name
Title	Year	Album/EP
"Victorious" (Shub featuring Tia Wood)	2025	Heritage (Part One)

=== Guest appearances ===
List of guest appearances, with other artists, showing year released and album name
Title	Year	Other artist(s)	Album/EP
"Shapeshifter"	2024	Snotty Nose Rez Kids	Red Future
