= Harm & Ease =

Canadian rock band

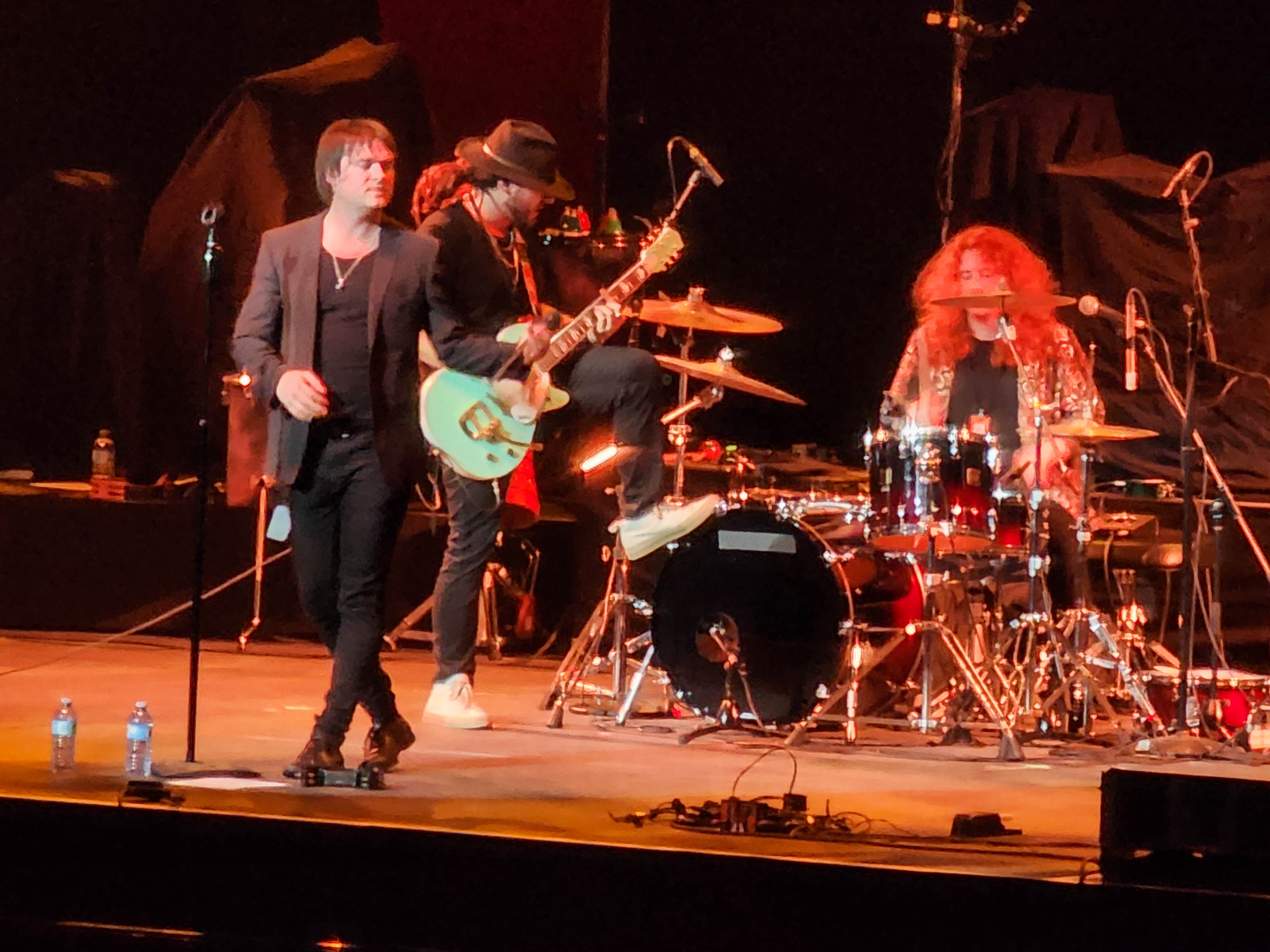
- Harm & Ease performing in 2023; left to right, Rylan Whalen (vocals), Danny Lopez (guitar), and Alex Hamnett (drums)

Background information
- Origin: Burlington, Ontario, Canada
- Genres: Argentine rock · punk (early) · emo (early) rock · Modern Rock
- Years active: 2010–present
- Members: Danny Lopez; Rylan Whalen; Alex Hamnett; John Goodblood; Christina Dare

Harm & Ease is a Canadian rock band from Burlington, Ontario, who received a Juno Award nomination for Breakthrough Group of the Year at the Juno Awards of 2023.

== History ==
The band was originally formed in 2010 as an acoustic duo by high school friends Danny Lopez and Rylan Whalen, later adding drummer Alex Hamnett as they shifted toward an emo and punk style, but went on hiatus when they were in Grade 12 and Lopez's family, who had moved to Canada as refugees from Colombia, ended up moving to Argentina. They stayed in touch, continuing to write songs together over Skype, until Whalen could afford to fly to Argentina, where they performed as street buskers until meeting bassist John Goodblood.

They performed in Argentine clubs for several years, with their sound evolving toward a riff-heavy classic rock style due to Argentine musical tastes. They released the albums Wonderful Changes (2017) and Black Magic Gold (2018) in Argentina before returning to Canada, where they reunited with Hamnett and recorded the band's third album Midnight Crisis in 2020.

Their fourth album, Camino Loco, was produced by Tawgs Salter and released in 2022.
