= Juno Award for Contemporary Indigenous Artist of the Year =

Indigenous Canadian Music Award

The Juno Award for Contemporary Indigenous Artist of the Year is an annual Canadian music award, presented by the Juno Awards to honour music created by Indigenous Canadian artists working in contemporary music genres. Announced at the Juno Awards of 2021, it was presented for the first time at the Juno Awards of 2022.

It is presented alongside a new category for Traditional Indigenous Artist of the Year.

Prior to 2022, contemporary and traditional Indigenous artists were honoured alongside each other in a single category for Indigenous Artist or Group of the Year.

== Winners and nominees ==
Year	Winner	Album	Nominees	Ref.
2022	DJ Shub	War Club	Shawnee Kish, Shawnee Kish; Snotty Nose Rez Kids, Life After; Adrian Sutherland, When the Magic Hits; Jayli Wolf, Wild Whisper	
2023	Digging Roots	Zhawenim	Susan Aglukark, The Crossing; Aysanabee, Watin; Indian City, Code Red; Julian Taylor, Beyond the Reservoir	
2024	Elisapie	Inuktitut	Aysanabee, Here and Now; Blue Moon Marquee, Scream, Holler & Howl; Shawnee Kish, Revolution; Zoon, Bekka Ma’iingan	
2025	Sebastian Gaskin	Brown Man	Celeigh Cardinal, Boundless Possibilities; Snotty Nose Rez Kids, Red Future; Adrian Sutherland, Precious Diamonds; Tia Wood, Pretty Red Bird	
2026	Aysanabee	Edge of the Earth	Sebastian Gaskin, Lovechild; Shawnee Kish, Chapter 1; Siibii, Siibii; Tia Wood, Sage My Soul	
