= The Bearhead Sisters =

The Bearhead Sisters are a musical trio from Paul First Nation, Alberta, Canada. Their album Unbreakable, won the Juno Award for Traditional Indigenous Artist of the Year at the Juno Awards of 2023.

The group, consisting of sisters Allie, Trina, and Carly Bearhead, perform traditional First Nations pow-wow music.

== History ==
The Bearhead Sisters competed in the third season of Canada's Got Talent. Later that year they performed an altered version of 'O Canada' at an Edmonton Oilers hockey game in solidarity with Palestine.

In 2024, after releasing their album 'Mitòòdebi', the sisters were nominated for a Juno award for best traditional Indigenous group. They performed on the second night of the Juno block party event, with a fourth sister, Simone, filling in for Ally.
