= Juno Award for Classical Album of the Year – Solo =

Canadian music award

The Juno Award for Classical Album of the Year - Solo is an annual Canadian music award, presented by the Juno Awards to honour classical music recordings by solo vocal or instrumental artists.

It was presented for the first time at the Juno Awards of 2022, as a split of the former category for Classical Album of the Year – Solo or Chamber Ensemble into separate awards for soloists and small ensembles. The category for Classical Album of the Year – Vocal or Choral Performance was also concurrently discontinued.

== Winners and nominees ==
Year	Winner	Album	Nominees	Ref.
2022	Emily D'Angelo	enargeia	Joshua Hopkins, Songs for Murdered Sisters; Catherine Lee, Remote Together; Jan Lisiecki, Chopin: Complete Nocturnes; Yannick Nézet-Séguin, Introspection: Solo Piano Sessions	
2023	Philip Chiu	Fables	Isabel Bayrakdarian, La Zingarella: Through Romany Songland; James Ehnes, Bach: Sonatas and Partitas for Solo Violin; David Jalbert, Prokofiev: Piano Sonatas; Bruce Liu, Winner of the 18th International Fryderyk Chopin Piano Competition Warsaw 2021	
2024	James Ehnes	Nielsen: Violin Concerto, Symphony No. 4	Barbara Hannigan, Infinite Voyage; Matt Haimovitz, De Hartmann: Cello Concerto; Marc-André Hamelin, Fauré: Nocturnes & Barcarolles; Suzie LeBlanc, mouvance	
2025	Emily D'Angelo	Freezing	Angèle Dubeau, Signature Phillip Glass; James Ehnes, Williams Violin Concerto No. 1: Bernstein Serenade; India Gailey, Butterfly Lightning Shakes the Earth; Barbara Hannigan, Messaien	
2026	Jan Lisiecki	Preludes by Chopin, Bach, Rachmaninoff, Messiaen, Górecki	Katherine Dowling, Awake and Dreaming; Haitham Haidar, Zaytoun; Bruce Liu, Tchaikovsky: The Seasons; Marie Nadeau-Tremblay, Obsession	
