= Juno Awards of 2022 =

Canadian music awards ceremony

- The 2022 Juno Awards Logo
- Date: May 15, 2022
- Venue: Budweiser Stage; Toronto, Ontario
- Hosted by: Simu Liu

Highlights
- Most wins: Charlotte Cardin (4)
- Most nominations: Charlotte Cardin (6)
- Website: https://junoawards.ca/

Television/radio coverage
- Network: CBC

The Juno Awards of 2022 were held on May 15, 2022 in Toronto, Ontario. The awards were presented at the Budweiser Stage, an outdoor venue, and was hosted by actor Simu Liu.

They were planned as an in-person gala ceremony, for the first time in three years due to the COVID-19 pandemic in Canada. This was the first time the ceremony had been held in Toronto since the Juno Awards of 2011 (they were scheduled to hold an in-person ceremony in 2021, but were unable to do so due to the COVID-19 pandemic).

== Special awards ==
Deborah Cox was announced as 2022's inductee into the Canadian Music Hall of Fame, Susan Aglukark was named the winner of the Juno Humanitarian Award, and Shawn Mendes was honoured with a special International Achievement Award to honour his global impact in music.

== Category changes ==
Several category changes were announced by Canadian Academy of Recording Arts and Sciences chair Allen Reid at the 2021 Juno Awards:

- the former award for Rap Recording of the Year was split into two new categories for Rap Album/EP of the Year and Rap Single of the Year,
- the former award for Indigenous Artist or Group of the Year was split into new categories for Contemporary Indigenous Artist of the Year and Traditional Indigenous Artist of the Year,
- the former award for Classical Album of the Year – Solo or Chamber Ensemble was split into separate awards for Classical Album of the Year - Solo and Classical Album of the Year - Small Ensemble, with the award for Classical Album of the Year – Vocal or Choral Performance discontinued since the split meant that category was now fully duplicative of the other classical music categories,
- and a new category was introduced for Underground Dance Single of the Year.

== Live performances ==
Liu opened the ceremony with an updated riff on the 2000 "I Am Canadian" beer commercial, highlighting contemporary signifiers such as multicultural food, runaway housing prices and the legalization of marijuana. Later in the ceremony, he also sang a short parody of Avril Lavigne's hit single "Complicated", with lyrics about his own rise from a working Canadian actor to a major movie star.

- Arkells — "Reckoning"/"You Can Get It"
- Tesher — "Jalebi Baby"
- Lauren Spencer-Smith — "Fingers Crossed"
- Haviah Mighty — "So So"/"Protest"
- Charlotte Cardin — "Meaningless"
- Mustafa — "Stay Alive"
- Avril Lavigne — "Complicated"/"Bite Me"/"Girlfriend"/"Sk8er Boi"/"I'm with You"
- DJ Shub & Snotty Nose Rez Kids — "War Club"
- Deborah Cox — "Where Do We Go from Here"/"Nobody's Supposed to Be Here"/"Who Do U Love"/"Beautiful U R"
- bbno$ — "Lalala"/"edamame"
- Arcade Fire — "Unconditional I (Lookout Kid)"

== Winners and nominees ==
Nominees were announced on 1 March 2022.

=== People ===
Artist of the Year	Group of the Year
Charlotte Cardin; Justin Bieber; Shawn Mendes; JP Saxe; The Weeknd	Arkells; Loud Luxury; Mother Mother; The Reklaws; Valley
Breakthrough Artist of the Year	Breakthrough Group of the Year
Jessia; 347aidan; Faouzia; Pressa; Tesher	Monowhales; Black Pistol Fire; Cleopatrick; Ocie Elliott; Spiritbox
Fan Choice Award	Songwriter of the Year
Shawn Mendes; 347aidan; bbno$; Charlotte Cardin; Forest Blakk; Jessia; Justin Bieber; Loud Luxury; Pressa; The Weeknd	Abel Tesfaye — "Hurricane", "Moth to a Flame", "Take My Breath"; Mustafa Ahmed — "Air Forces", "The Hearse", "What About Heaven"; Allison Russell — "4th Day Prayer", "Montreal", "Nightflyer"; Tobi — "Off The Drugs", "Shall I Continue", "Too Hot"; Charlotte Day Wilson — "I Can Only Whisper", "If I Could", "Wish It Was Easy"
Producer of the Year	Recording Engineer of the Year
WondaGurl — "Fair Trade" (Drake feat. Travis Scott), "Made a Way" (FaZe Kaysan feat. Lil Durk and Future); Chromeo — On My Mind" (Anomalie & Chromeo), "Tango" (Onyx Collective); Kaytranada — "Caution" (Kaytranada), "Teen Scene" (Maeta); Charlotte Day Wilson — "I Can Only Whisper" (Charlotte Day Wilson feat. BadBadNotGood), "If I Could" (Charlotte Day Wilson); YogiTheProducer — "24hrs" (Savannah Ré), "Solid" (Savannah Ré)	Hill Kourkoutis — "Howler" (SATE), "The Drought" (Tania Joy); Evan Miles — "Told You" (Jon Vinyl), "Use Me" (Plaza); George Seara — "Coldest Fire" (AHI, "Teach Me How to Love" (Shawn Mendes); John "Beetle" Bailey — "Maybe This Year" (Molly Johnson), "Mi Santuario" (Sultans of String feat. Juan Carlos Medrano); Serban Ghenea — "Leave the Door Open" (Anderson .Paak, Bruno Mars and Silk Sonic), "Stay" (The Kid Laroi and Justin Bieber)

=== Albums ===
Album of the Year	Adult Alternative Album of the Year
Charlotte Cardin, Phoenix; Justin Bieber, Justice; Tate McRae, Too Young to Be Sad; Shawn Mendes, Wonder; JP Saxe, Dangerous Levels of Introspection	Half Moon Run, Inwards & Onwards; Bahamas, Live to Tape, Vol. 1; Hannah Georgas, All That Emotion; Andy Shauf, Wilds; The Weather Station, Ignorance
Adult Contemporary Album of the Year	Alternative Album of the Year
Serena Ryder, The Art of Falling Apart; Tafari Anthony, The Way You See Me; Desirée Dawson, Meet You at the Light; Luca Fogale, Nothing Is Lost; Mathew V, The Outer Circle	Mustafa, When Smoke Rises; Chiiild, Hope for Sale; Grandson, Death of an Optimist; Ruby Waters, If It Comes Down to It; SATE, The Fool
Blues Album of the Year	Children's Album of the Year
Colin James, Open Road; Sue Foley, Pinky's Blues; Colin Linden, bLOW; Steve Marriner, Hope Dies Last; Miss Emily, Live at the Isabel	Garth Prince, Falling in Africa; ABC Singsong, Words Words Words; The Oot n' Oots, Ponderosa Bunchgrass and the Golden Rule; Walk Off the Earth and Romeo Eats, Walk Off the Earth & Romeo Eats, Vol. 1; Maestro Fresh Wes, School Days
Classical Album of the Year – Solo	Classical Album of the Year – Large Ensemble
Emily D'Angelo, enargeia; Joshua Hopkins, Songs for Murdered Sisters; Catherine Lee, Remote Together; Jan Lisiecki, Chopin: Complete Nocturnes; Yannick Nézet-Séguin, Introspection: Solo Piano Sessions	L'Harmonie des saisons conducted by Eric Milnes ft. Hélène Brunet, Solfeggio; Against the Grain Theatre with the Toronto Symphony Orchestra conducted by Johannes Debus, Messiah/Complex; Orchestre Métropolitain de Montréal conducted by Yannick Nézet-Séguin, Sibelius 3; Studio de musique ancienne de Montréal conducted by Andrew McAnerney, L'Homme armé; The Philadelphia Orchestra conducted by Yannick Nézet-Séguin, Rachmaninoff: Symphony No. 1 & Symphonic Dances
Classical Album of the Year – Small Ensemble	Contemporary Christian/Gospel Album of the Year
Andrew Wan and Charles Richard-Hamelin, Beethoven: Sonates pour violon et piano / Violin Sonatas Nos. 1, 2, 3 & 5; Angèle Dubeau & La Pietà, Immersion; ARC Ensemble, Klebanov: Chamber Works; Collectif9, No Time for Chamber Music; Standing Wave, 20C Remix	The Color, No Greater Love; Kevin Adams and Voices of Praise, For the Kingdom; Jennifer Lewin, Songs of the Lord; Manic Drive, Vol. 1; Movement Worship, Moments Movement
Contemporary Indigenous Artist of the Year	Traditional Indigenous Artist of the Year
DJ Shub, War Club; Shawnee Kish, Shawnee Kish; Snotty Nose Rez Kids, Life After; Adrian Sutherland, When the Magic Hits; Jayli Wolf, Wild Whisper	Fawn Wood, Kakike; Manitou Mkwa Singers, Manitou Mkwa Singers II; Nimkii and the Niniis, Nang Giizhigoong; Joel Wood, Singing Is Healing; Young Spirit, Angel Eagle: Cree Round Dance Songs
Country Album of the Year	Electronic Album of the Year
Brett Kissel, What Is Life?; Tenille Arts, Girl to Girl; Dean Brody, Boys; Tim Hicks, Campfire Troubadour; The Reklaws, Sophomore Slump	Tor, Oasis Sky; Attlas, Out Here With You; Sydney Blu, Conviction; The Halluci Nation, One More Saturday Night; Zeds Dead, Catching Z’s
Francophone Album of the Year	Instrumental Album of the Year
Cœur de pirate, Impossible à aimer; Roxane Bruneau, Acrophobie; Louis-Jean Cormier, Le ciel est au plancher; FouKi, Grignotines de Luxe; Vincent Vallières, Toute beauté n’est pas perdue	David Myles, That Tall Distance; Cœur de pirate, Perséides; Frank Evans and Ben Plotnick, Madison Archives; Jorane, Hemenetset; Jens Lindemann with Jon Kimura Parker, Matt Catingub and the Canadian All Star JazzPops Orchestra, Then is Now Rhapsody in Blue
International Album of the Year	Jazz Album of the Year – Solo
Olivia Rodrigo, Sour; Adele, 30; Doja Cat, Planet Her; The Kid Laroi, F** ck Love 3: Over You; Taylor Swift, Evermore	Will Bonness, Change of Plans; Efajemue, Aesthetics; Jon Gordon, Stranger Than Fiction; Jesse Ryan, Bridges; Andrés Vial, When Is Ancient?
Jazz Album of the Year – Group	Vocal Jazz Album of the Year
Avataar, Worldview; Lina Allemano Four, Vegetables; Esteban Herrera, The Prophet; The David Restivo Trio, Arancina; Christine Tassan Quintette, Voyage intérieur	Caity Gyorgy, Now Pronouncing: Caity Gyorgy; Alex Bird and the Jazz Mavericks, You Are the Light and the Way; Holly Cole Trio, Montreal (Live); Elizabeth Shepherd and Michael Occhipinti, The Weight of Hope; Amanda Tosoff, Earth Voices
Metal/Hard Music Album of the Year	Pop Album of the Year
Archspire, Bleed the Future; The Agonist, Days Before the World Wept; Brand of Sacrifice, Lifeblood; Danko Jones, Power Trio; Spiritbox, Eternal Blue	Charlotte Cardin, Phoenix; Justin Bieber, Justice; Jessia, How Are You?; Tate McRae, Too Young to Be Sad; Shawn Mendes, Wonder
Rap Album/EP of the Year	Rock Album of the Year
Haviah Mighty, Stock Exchange; Belly, See You Next Wednesday; Nav, Emergency Tsunami; NorthSideBenji, The Extravagant Collection; Pressa, Gardner Express (Deluxe)	The Beaches, Sisters Not Twins (The Professional Lovers Album); Arkells, Blink Once; Black Pistol Fire, Look Alive; The Blue Stones, Hidden Gems; The Dirty Nil, Fuck Art
Contemporary Roots Album of the Year	Traditional Roots Album of the Year
Allison Russell, Outside Child; AHI, Prospect; The Fretless, Open House; Suzie Ungerleider, My Name Is Suzie Ungerleider; Donovan Woods, Without People	Maria Dunn, Joyful Banner Blazing; Alan Doyle, Back to the Harbour; The Fugitives, Trench Songs; Over the Moon, Chinook Waltz; John Reischman, New Time & Old Acoustic
Global Music Album of the Year	Comedy Album of the Year
Afrikana Soul Sister, Kalasö; Alex Cuba, Mendó; Beny Esguerra and New Tradition Music, Northside Kuisi: A New Tradition, Vol. 3; Moonshine, SMS for Location, Vol. 4; Donné Roberts, OYA	Andrea Jin, Grandma's Girl; Seán Devlin, Airports, Animals; Hisham Kelati, Tigre King; Keith Pedro, Trillipino; Gavin Stephens, All Inclusive Coma

=== Songs and recordings ===
Single of the Year	Classical Composition of the Year
Charlotte Cardin, "Meaningless"; Justin Bieber and Daniel Caesar ft. Giveon, "Peaches"; Jessia, "I'm Not Pretty"; Brett Kissel, "Make a Life, Not a Living"; The Weeknd, "Take My Breath"	Keiko Devaux, "Arras"; Kati Agócs, "Concerto for Violin and Percussion Orchestra"; Dorothy Chang, "Flight"; Jaap Nico Hamburger, "Chamber Symphony No. 2: Children’s War Diaries"; Saman Shahi, "Breathing in the Shadows"
Dance Recording of the Year	Rap Single of the Year
Kaytranada, "Caution"; Ceréna, "see"; DVBBS, "Sleep"; Karl Wolf, "Get Away (Radio Edit)"; Rezz and deadmau5, "Hypnocurrency"	Charmaine, "Bold"; Anders and FRVRFRIDAY, "What I Like"; bbno$ feat. Rich Brian, "edamame"; NorthSideBenji and DJ Charlie B, "30,000"; Pressa feat. Taliban Glizzy, "Attachments"
Contemporary R&B/Soul Recording of the Year	Traditional R&B/Soul Recording of the Year
The Weeknd, "Take My Breath"; a l l i e, Tabula Rasa; Aqyila, "Vibe for Me (Bob for Me)"; Kallitechnis, "Gifted"; K-os, "Supernovas"	Savannah Ré, 24hrs; Charlotte Day Wilson, Alpha; Emanuel, Alt Therapy; Jon Vinyl, Lost in You; Zenesoul feat. Aaron Ridge, "Love and Be Loved"
Reggae Recording of the Year	Underground Dance Single of the Year
Kairo McLean, "Easy Now"; Blessed, "Herb Dream"; Exco Levi, "By Any Means"; Josemar, "Don't Let It Get to You"; Kirk Diamond and Finn, "Too Ruff"	HNTR feat. Elliot Moss, "Shadows in the Dark"; Blond:ish feat. Grace Tither, "Waves"; Carlo Lio feat. MC Flipside, "Hood Shit"; Jayda G, "All I Need (DJ-Kicks)"; Korea Town Acid, "Sobriety"

=== Other ===
Album Artwork of the Year	Video of the Year
Mykaël Nelson, Nicolas Lemieux, Albert Zablit — Montreal Symphony Orchestra conducted by Simon Leclerc, Histoires sans paroles: Harmonium symphonique; Lyle Bell — Whitehorse, Strike Me Down; Roberta Landreth — Steve Bell, Wouldn't You Love to Know?; Sarah Marcotte-Boislard — Louis-Jean Cormier, Le ciel est au plancher; Sarah Marcotte-Boislard and Jules Boislard-Gauthier — Dany Placard, Astronomie (suite)	Xavier Dolan — Adele, "Easy on Me"; Vincent René-Lortie — Simon Leoza, "La nuée"; Adrian Villagomez — Ariane Roy, "Ta main"; Shan Vincent de Paul and Kalainithan Kalaichelvan — Shan Vincent de Paul, Navz-47 and Santhosh Narayanan, "Neeye Oli"; Norman Wong — Charlotte Cardin, "Meaningless"
MusiCounts Teacher of the Year
Darren Hamilton - David Suzuki Secondary School, Brampton, ON; Jewel Casselman - Lakewood School, Winnipeg, MB; Sophie Jalbert - École Roy-Joly, Rivière-du-Loup, QC; Kelly Stronach - Mitchell Woods Public School, Guelph, ON; Janell Toews - Our Lady of the Snows Catholic Academy, Canmore, AB
