= Jon Vinyl =

Canadian singer

Jon Vinyl is a Canadian soul and rhythm and blues singer, whose debut album Lost in You was a Juno Award nominee for Traditional R&B/Soul Recording of the Year at the Juno Awards of 2022. In 2023, he received another Juno nomination in the same category for his EP Palisade at the Juno Awards of 2023.

Originally from Toronto, Ontario, by the time he was a teenager his family moved to suburban Pickering, where he was a classmate and friend of Shawn Mendes. He released a number of singles, including "Nostalgia" and "Cherry Blossom", beginning in 2017, and received a promotional boost when Mendes shared the songs on his social media profiles.

In early 2021 he released the single "Told You" as an advance preview of Lost in You, and the full album was released on October 1, 2021.

In 2023, he participated in an all-star recording of Serena Ryder's single "What I Wouldn't Do", which was released as a charity single to benefit Kids Help Phone's Feel Out Loud campaign for youth mental health.
