= Cikwes =

Cikwes is the stage name of Connie LeGrande, a Cree musician from Canada. She is most noted as a Juno Award nominee for Traditional Indigenous Artist of the Year at the Juno Awards of 2023 for her 2022 album Kâkîsimo ᑳᑮᓯᒧᐤ.

A member of the Bigstone Cree Nation, she is based in Edmonton, Alberta.

LeGrande released Isko, her debut album as Cikwes, in 2018. The album was nominated for Best Folk Album at the 2019 Indigenous Music Awards; however, it faced controversy when several musicians, including Tanya Tagaq, Kelly Fraser and A Tribe Called Red, pulled out of the awards over allegations that Legrande had committed cultural appropriation by performing Inuit throat singing on the album. LeGrande, for her part, noted that throat singing is not unique to Inuit culture, but in fact has numerous forms and styles in different cultures around the world, and asserted that she had not tried to perform in the Inuit style. Lisa Meeches, the director of the awards, faced further criticism when she stated that she considered it impossible for Indigenous cultures to appropriate each other. Despite calls for her nomination to be rescinded, the awards did not do so.
