= Young Spirit =

Canadian Cree drum group

- Origin: Frog Lake, Alberta, Canada
- Genre: Traditional Cree
- Years active: 2001–present

Young Spirit are a Cree drum group formed in Frog Lake, Alberta, in 2001. They performed for the first time at the Samson Cree First Nation Pow-wow. The band's musical style is traditional Cree round dancing songs, with the group of singers striking hand drums in unison. The group is known for their contemporary take on this traditional and sacred form of music which the Plains Cree received from the Assiniboine in the late 19th century. In 2018, Young Spirit received a Grammy Award nomination for their album Mewasinsational – Cree Round Dance Songs.

Their album Angel Eagle: Cree Round Dance Songs was a Juno Award nominee for Traditional Indigenous Artist of the Year at the Juno Awards of 2022.

They were again nominated for a Grammy Award in the category of Best Regional Roots Music Album in 2019.

In 2024, they released Ostesihtowin – "Brotherhood" and received a nomination for the 2025 Juno Awards in the Traditional Indigenous Artist of the Year category.

== Discography ==
=== Studio albums ===
- Neechmus: Cree Round Dance (2002)
- It's All About the Drum (2006)
- Save Me a Lead (2013)
- Akameyimoh Baby Boy (2014)
- Niteheochi – "From the Heart" (2014)
- Mewasinsational – Cree Round Dance Songs (2017)
- sâkītohk – "Love Each Other" (2017)
- Love, Life, Round Dance (2019)
- Angel Eagle: Cree Round Dance Songs (2021)
- Ostesihtowin – "Brotherhood" (2024)

=== Live albums ===
- Takakikeh – Doing it Right (2013)
- Red Dress Special (2018)
