= Joel Wood (musician) =

Joel Wood is a Cree musician from Maskwacis, Alberta, Canada. He is most noted for his albums Singing Is Healing, which was a Juno Award nominee for Traditional Indigenous Artist of the Year at the Juno Awards of 2022, and Sing. Pray. Love., which won the same category at the Juno Awards of 2024.

He is the son of Steve Wood, a musician with the traditional Cree group Northern Cree with whom Joel has also performed as a member, and the cousin of Fawn Wood, a musician who was a fellow Juno nominee in the same category in 2022.
