= Juno Award for South Asian Music Recording of the Year =

Canadian music award

The Juno Award for South Asian Music Recording of the Year is an annual Canadian music award, presented by the Juno Awards to honour full-length releases by Canadian artists working in South Asian music genres.

It was one of several new categories announced by the Juno Awards committee in fall 2024, and was presented for the first time at the Juno Awards of 2025.

== Winners and nominees ==
Year	Winner	Album	Nominees	Ref.
2025	AP Dhillon	The Brownprint	Karan Aujla, Tauba Tauba; Jonita Gandhi, Love Like That; Chani Nattan, Inderpal Moga and Jazzy B, Coolin; Yanchan Produced and Sandeep Narayan, Arul	
2026	Karan Aujla	P-Pop Culture	AP Dhillon and Anuv Jain, Afsos; Ikky and Raf Saperra, Renaissance; Shubh, Supreme; Sukha, By Any Means	
