= Juno Award for Classical Album of the Year – Small Ensemble =

Canadian music award

The Juno Award for Classical Album of the Year - Small Ensemble is an annual Canadian music award, presented by the Juno Awards to honour classical music recordings by small classical ensembles, such as chamber orchestras or collaborations between individual performers.

It was presented for the first time at the Juno Awards of 2022, as a split of the former category for Classical Album of the Year – Solo or Chamber Ensemble into separate awards for small ensembles and soloists. The category for Classical Album of the Year – Vocal or Choral Performance was also concurrently discontinued.

== Winners and nominees ==
Year	Winner	Album	Nominees	Ref.
2022	Andrew Wan and Charles Richard-Hamelin	Beethoven: Sonates pour violon et piano / Violin Sonatas Nos. 1, 2, 3 & 5	Angèle Dubeau & La Pietà, Immersion; ARC Ensemble, Klebanov: Chamber Works; Collectif9, No Time for Chamber Music; Standing Wave, 20C Remix	
2023	Elinor Frey and Rosa Barocca, conducted by Claude Lapalme	Early Italian Cello Concertos	ARC Ensemble, Hemsi: Chamber Works; Andrew Balfour and Musica Intima, Nagamo; Collectif9, Vagues et ombres; Suzie LeBlanc, Marie Nadeau-Tremblay, Vincent Lauzer and Sylvain Bergeron, De la cour de Louis XIV à Shippagan! Chants traditionnels acadiens et airs de cour du XVIIe siècle	
2024	Constantinople	Il Ponte di Leonardo	Andrew Armstrong and James Ehnes, Mythes; Les Barocudas, Basta parlare!; Cheng² Duo, Portrait; Angèle Dubeau and La Pietà Analekta, Portrait: Alex Baranowski	
2025	collectif9	Rituæls	Canadian Art Song Project, Known to Dreamers: Black Voices in Canadian Art Song; Karina Gauvin, Marie Hubert: Fille du Roy; Infusion Baroque, East Is East; St. John–Mercer–Park Trio, Kevin Lau: Under a Veil of Stars	
2026	Mariko Anraku, Conrad Chow, Ron Korb, Rachel Mercer	Kevin Lau: Kimiko's Pearl	CC Duo and collectif9, Re/String; Ensemble Caprice with Matthias Maute, Vivaldi Les Quatres Nations (reconstruites); Standing Wave Ensemble, in an archipelago; Timothy Long and the Continuum Ensemble, Current: Missing, ATOM (Artists of the Opera Missing)	
