= Emi Jeen =

Canadian Alt-Pop singer

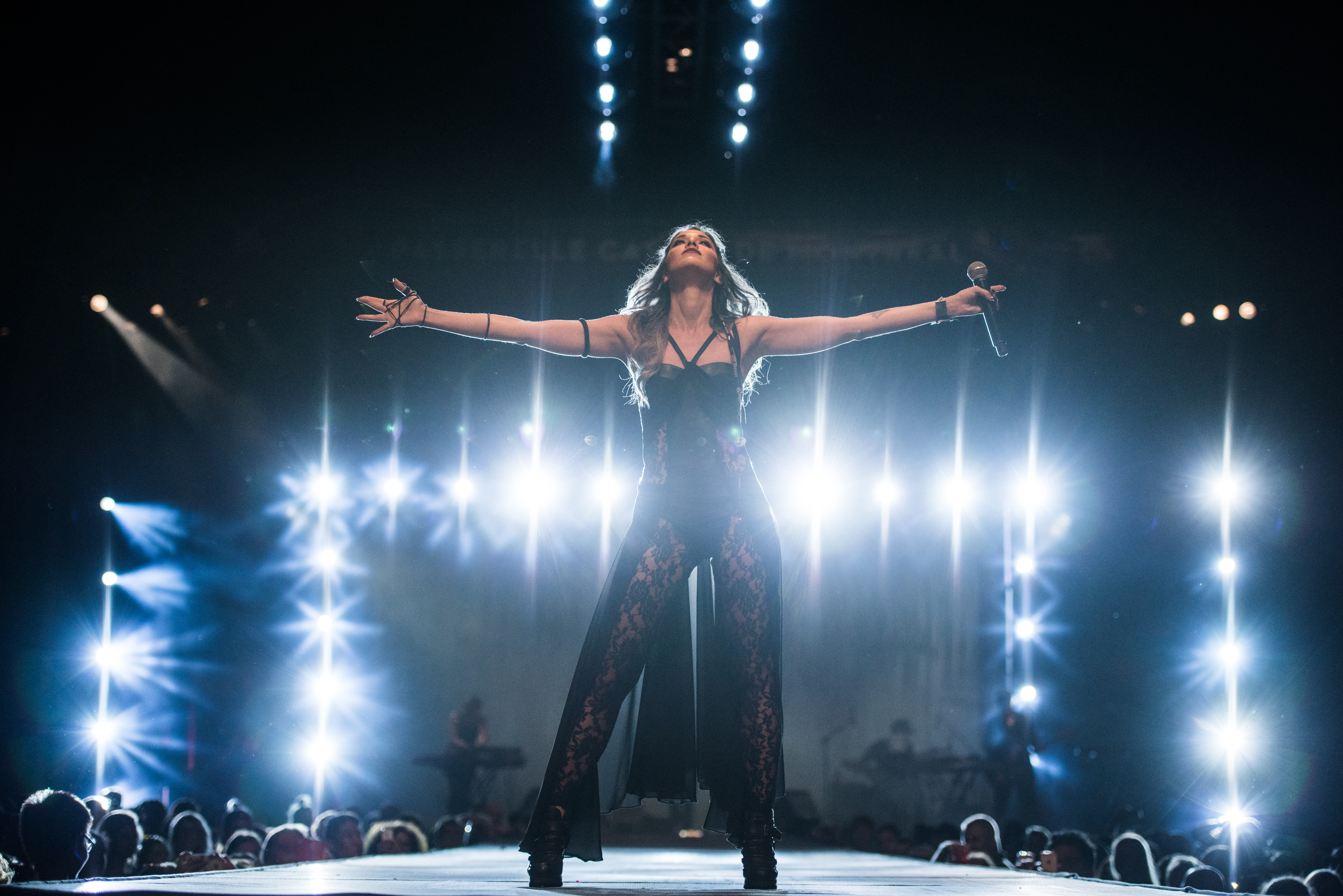
- Emi Jeen performing at Festival Mode & Design de Montréal 2016

Background information
- Born: Emilie Bernier; Saint-Jean-Port-Joli, Quebec
- Genres: Alternative, pop, indie pop, pop rock
- Occupations: Singer, songwriter
- Instruments: Vocals, piano
- Years active: 2009–present
- Website: www.emijeen.com

Emi Jeen (born Emilie Bernier) is a Canadian alt-pop singer-songwriter from Saint-Jean-Port-Joli, Quebec.

Her debut single, "Runaway", was released on August 7, 2020. Her debut EP, The Other Side, was released on October 30, 2020. In 2022, she gained attention after a viral TikTok video (17 million views) of her singing a cover of "Bring Me To Life" by Evanescence. She released her second project, the EP Why So Serious, on September 16, 2022. She opened for Our Lady Peace at the Festivent 2023 and released her third EP, Terrible Perfect Timing, on October 23, 2023. In 2024, she initiated a project to release a song each month for eight consecutive months, resulting in two EPs titled Razzle and Dazzle. During the same year, Jeen joined Kelsy Karter and the Heroines on a tour across the United States and toured Europe and the United Kingdom with Charlotte Sands.

== Biography ==
Emi Jeen started singing with her mother in local clubs. Her interest in music evolved into taking classical music singing lessons by the age of 10.

In 2010, she attended Concordia University, where she graduated in communication studies.

She then toured in six countries from Malaysia to Morocco with the all-girl group, A.K.A. Their song "Hot For Me" was picked up by Ubisoft for their Just Dance 4 video game.

== Discography ==
- The Other Side (EP, 2020)
- Why So Serious (EP, 2022)
- Terrible Perfect Timing (EP, 2023)
- Razzle (EP, 2024)
- Dazzle (EP, 2024)
