= Aqyila =

Canadian musician and actor

Taahira Aquiyla Duff, known by her stage name Aqyila, is a Canadian-Jamaican Contemporary R&B singer-songwriter from Toronto, Ontario.

== Music ==
She is most noted as winner of the Juno Award for Traditional R&B/Soul Recording of the Year at the Juno Awards of 2024, for her single "Hello".

She also received nominations for Contemporary R&B/Soul Recording of the Year at the Juno Awards of 2022 for her single "Vibe for Me (Bob for Me)" and the Juno Awards of 2024 for her EP For the Better. Her debut LP Falling Into Place came out March 28, 2025.

== Acting ==
Aqyila made her acting debut in the 300th episode of Murdoch Mysteries as Jazz singer Eudora Nadeau.

== Discography ==
=== Studio albums ===
Title	Album details
Falling into Place	Released: March 28, 2025; Label: Sony; Format: Digital download

=== Extended plays ===
Title	EP details
For the Better	Released: May 19, 2023; Label: Sony; Format: Digital download

=== Singles ===
==== As lead artist ====
Title	Year	Album/EP
"Soulmate"	2021	Non-album single
"Vibe for Me (Bob for Me)"	2021	For the Better
"Pressure"	2022	For the Better
"Oh!"	2022	For the Better
"Hello"	2023	For the Better
"Please Come Home for Christmas"	2023	Non-album single
"Effortlessly"	2024	For the Better
"Bloom" (solo or featuring Strings from Paris)	2024	Falling into Place
"Unbothered"	2024	Falling into Place
"Most Wanted"	2024	Falling into Place
"Passenger Princess (Remix)" (with Shae Universe)	2024	Non-album single
"Limbo"	2024	Falling into Place
"Focus"	2025	Falling into Place
"Wolf"	2025	Falling into Place

==== As featured artist ====
Title	Year	Album/EP
"Last of Your Love'" (Danii'X featuring Aqyila)	2020	ColderInTheSummer
