= Indigenous Music Awards =

Canadian music award

The Indigenous Music Awards, formerly called the Canadian Aboriginal Music Awards and the Aboriginal Peoples' Choice Awards, is an annual Canadian music award, given out to Indigenous people who are in the music industry.

The Indigenous Music Awards receives financial support of the Department of Canadian Heritage through the Canadian Online Strategy. The ceremony is broadcast on television by the Aboriginal Peoples Television Network.

In 2014 Iceis Rain became the first openly two-spirit person to perform at the Aboriginal Peoples Choice Music Awards.

In 2019, several Inuit artists, including Tanya Tagaq and Kelly Fraser, boycotted the awards over accusations of cultural appropriation. One of the award nominations in the Best Folk Album category that year was given to Connie LeGrande, a Cree artist from Saskatchewan whose album incorporated throat singing; however, as LeGrande had performed the throat singing herself rather than hiring an Inuk collaborator, she was accused of appropriating Inuit culture. LeGrande, for her part, stated that throat singing is not unique to Inuit culture, and that she had not tried to perform in the Inuit style. Lisa Meeches, the director of the awards, faced further criticism when she stated that she considered it impossible for Indigenous cultures to appropriate each other.

== See also ==
- Indigenous Canadian personalities
- Juno Award for Indigenous Artist or Group of the Year
- Indspire Awards
