= Elliot Moss =

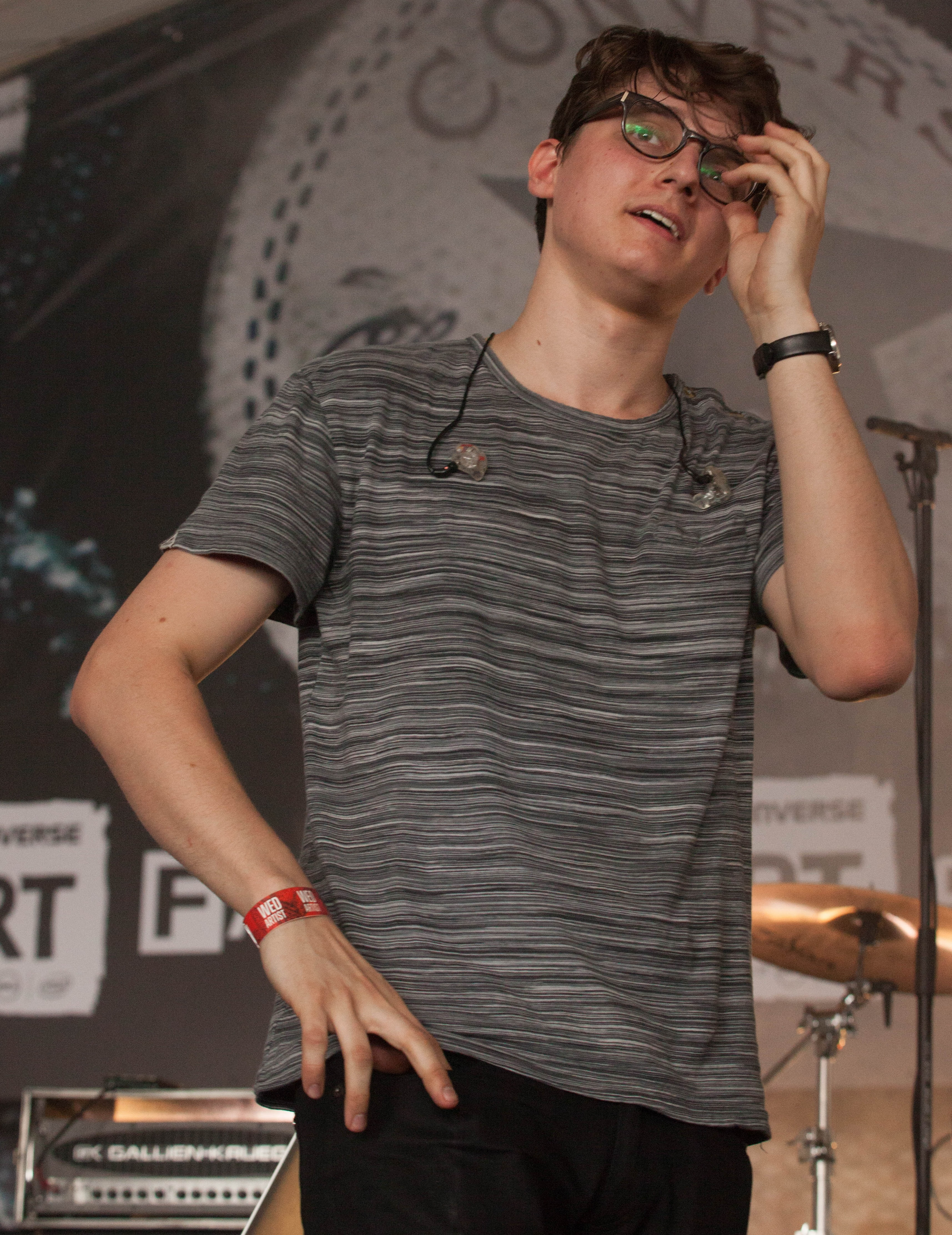
- Moss in 2015

Background information
- Origin: New York
- Genres: Electronic; Indie pop; Indietronic; Alternative
- Years active: 2014–present
- Website: elliotmoss.com

Elliot Moss is a multi-instrumentalist, songwriter, producer, and visual artist from New York City. In 2015, he released his debut album Highspeeds, which showcased his diverse talent. Moss had worked on the album since his sophomore year of high school.

In 2014, Moss started booking shows with his five-man band, covering material from both Highspeeds and songs from a new album scheduled for release in 2015. Moss has played in support of Cold War Kids, Digitalism, and Nada Surf, and has performed at venues such as CMJ and the Music Hall of Williamsburg. He played at "SXSW" in March 2015.

Paste magazine's review of the 2014 CMJ fest by Sean Moeller called Moss "as great as I wanted him to be," and New Music Nashville described his music as "smooth-as-they-come alternative electronic beats."

Hilly Dilly said that the song "Slip" "just might be the very definition of a hidden gem." The Musicality described the song as the "definition of a gem. The electro effects on his voice and the dark synths combine to make a track that is a laid-back, slow jam with elements of cool jazz."

In 2014, his music was featured in an episode of the MTV series Finding Carter. In October 2014, Moss signed with the booking company AM Only.

In 2020, "99" was featured in the popular STARZ TV show 'Power Book II: Ghost', Season 1, Episode 2, Exceeding Expectations. '99' plays during Ghost’s funeral scene. It reached the Top 50 on SHAZAM following the episode.

In 2021, "Slip" was featured in popular Netflix show, Elite.

== Discography ==
=== Albums ===
- Highspeeds (Original Release: October 15, 2013; Re-Released under Grand Jury Music Records: 2015)

| Track # | Song name |
|---|---|
| 1. | Highspeeds |
| 2. | Big Bad Wolf |
| 3. | Slip |
| 4. | Into the Icebox (Binaural) |
| 5. | Patterns Repeating |
| 6. | Even Great Things |
| 7. | I Can't Swim |
| 8. | Plastic II |
| 9. | Faraday Cage |
| 10. | About Time |
| 11. | Best Light |
| 12. | VCR Machine |

- Boomerang (2017)

| Track # | Song name |
|---|---|
| 1. | Closedloop |
| 2. | Without the Lights |
| 3. | 99 |
| 4. | Boomerang |
| 5. | My Statue Sinking |
| 6. | Dolly Zoom |
| 7. | Falling Down and Getting Hurt |

- A Change in Diet (2020)

| Track # | Song name |
|---|---|
| 1. | July 4 |
| 2. | Off by One |
| 3. | Barricade |
| 4. | Smile in the Rain |
| 5. | Bodyintoshapes |
| 6. | Untroubled Minds |
| 7. | Rabbit Roads |
| 8. | In the Same Place |
| 10. | Silver + Gold |
| 11. | Dogcatcher |
| 12. | A Change in Diner |

- How I Fell (2024)

=== Singles ===
- "Big Bad Wolf" (2013)
- "Slip" (2013)
- "Without the Lights" (2016)
- "Closedloop" (2017)
- "Barricade" (2019)
- "Bodyintoshapes" (2020)

== Awards and nominations ==
2016: Berlin Music Video Awards, nominated in the Best Concept category with ' pattern repeating '
