= Juno Humanitarian Award =

Canadian music award

The Humanitarian Award (formerly the Allan Waters Humanitarian Award) is awarded by the Canadian Academy of Recording Arts and Sciences (CARAS) to Canadian musicians who have made significant humanitarian efforts. Since 2006, it is given annually every Juno Awards ceremony.

Waters, whose name was attached to the award until 2017, was one of the founders of CHUM Limited. His name was removed from the award title effective with the 2018 Juno Awards.

== Recipients ==
- 2006 - Bruce Cockburn
- 2007 - Tom Jackson
- 2008 - Paul Brandt
- 2009 - Sarah McLachlan
- 2010 - Bryan Adams
- 2011 - Neil Young
- 2012 - Simple Plan
- 2013 - Tom Cochrane
- 2014 - Chantal Kreviazuk and Raine Maida
- 2015 - Rush
- 2016 - Arcade Fire
- 2017 - Buffy Sainte-Marie, revoked in 2025
- 2018 - Gary Slaight
- 2019 - David Foster
- 2020 - not presented
- 2021 - The Tragically Hip
- 2022 - Susan Aglukark
- 2023 - not presented
- 2024 - Tegan and Sara
- 2025 - Sarah Harmer
- 2026 - Billy Talent

== See also ==
- Music of Canada
