= DijahSB =

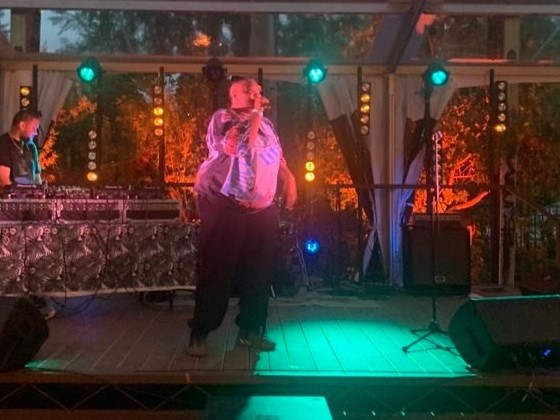
- Pop Montreal, September 23, 2021

Background information
- Also known as: Kzaraw
- Born: Kahdijah Payne; November 19, 1993 (age 33); Toronto, Ontario, Canada
- Genre: Hip-hop
- Years active: 2011–present
- Label: AWAL
- Website: dijahsb.com

Kahdijah Payne (born November 19, 1993), known professionally as DijahSB, is a rapper based in Toronto, Ontario. They released their debut album 2020 the Album in 2020, followed by their second album Head Above the Waters in 2021.

== Career ==
Beginning rapping professionally in 2011, they previously released music under the name Kzaraw and was part of a rap group Class of 93, along with their producer Jermaine “Astro Mega” Clarke. They later rebranded as DijahSB, with the name inspired by the Nike SB line of shoes.

In 2016, they released the EP Manic Luxury independently. They released their debut album in the summer of 2020. After releasing their first album, DijahSB signed a distribution deal with AWAL, quit their retail job at the Apple Store, and became a full-time musician. Their second album was released in April 2021, entitled Head Above the Waters. In 2021, they were named one of 20 musicians in Now Magazine's "The sound of Toronto in 2021". They have also collaborated with other artists including Harrison, Janette King and Brazilian rapper niLL.

Head Above the Waters was shortlisted for the 2021 Polaris Music Prize. The single "Frontin' Like Pharrell" was a nominee for the 2021 SOCAN Songwriting Prize. The most recent single Green Line featuring Terrell Morris is released in January 2022.

The Flower That Knew was a longlisted nominee for the 2024 Polaris Music Prize.

In March 2026, DijahSB announced a Kickstarter campaign to help to fund and release a new album titled Why Die When You Can Dance? In the same year they appeard on Cadence Weapon's album Forager, performing with Cadence and Junia-T as a guest vocalist on "Step Out". The song was longlisted for the 2026 SOCAN Polaris Song Prize.

They are the feature rapper in the house track "Pipe Down" produced by British act Snakehips which made into the official soundtrack for Forza Horizon 6.

== Personal life ==
DijahSB is non-binary, and of Jamaican and Aboriginal Canadian descent.

== Discography ==
=== Studio albums ===
- 2020 the Album (2020)
- Head Above the Waters (2021)
- The Flower That Knew (2024)

=== EPs ===
- Blue (2015)
- Manic Luxury (2016)
- Girls Give Me Anxiety (2020)
- Tasty Raps, Vol. 1 (2021)
- 2022 the EP (2022)
- Tasty Raps Vol. 2 (2023)
