= DJ Shub =

Canadian musician

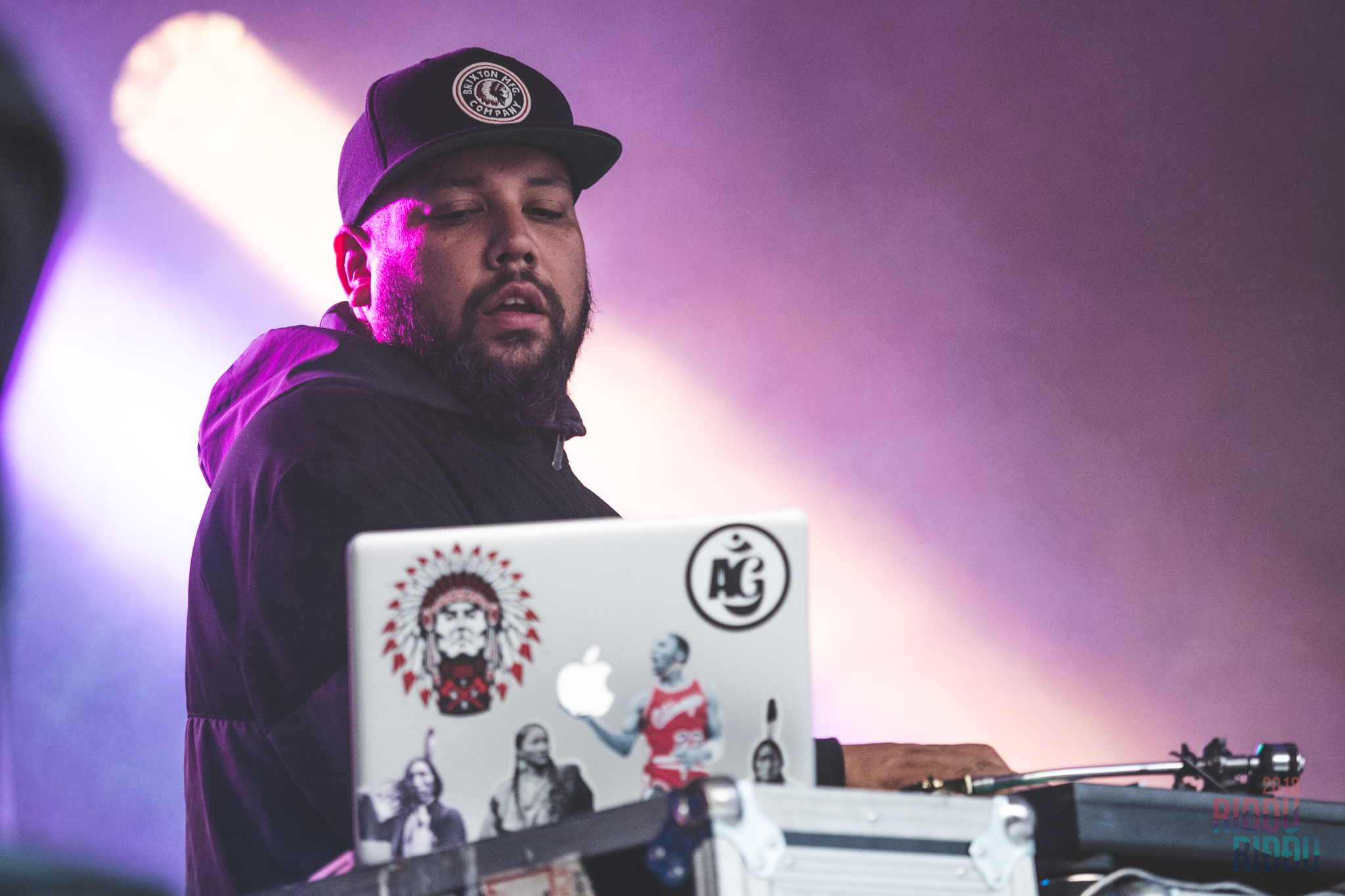
- DJ Shub at Riddu Riđđu 2018

Background information
- Also known as: DJ Shub
- Born: Dan General
- Genres: Dance music; electronic
- Occupations: Music producer; DJ; musician
- Instruments: digital audio workstation; programming
- Years active: 2014-present
- Formerly of: A Tribe Called Red
- Website: djshub.ca

Dan General is a Mohawk DJ and music producer and member of the Six Nations of the Grand River. He has won numerous awards for his work as a former member of A Tribe Called Red, a DJ, and for solo pursuits.

== Career ==
Shub began practising skills in his parents' basement, eventually winning the Canadian title at DJ competitions in 2007 and 2008. In 2012, he also represented Canada in the Redbull Thre3Style DJ competition in Chicago.

DJ Shub has won numerous awards as a DJ including DMC Canada DJ Championship titles (2007 and 2008), a DMC Canadian Battle for Supremacy title (2008), a Canadian Red Bull Thre3style title (2012).

DJ Shub was a member of the group A Tribe Called Red, leaving in 2014. With the group DJ Shub recorded a number of albums, including Nation II Nation, winning a number of awards, including Aboriginal People's Choice Music Award.

On December 2, 2016 DJ Shub released an EP entitled PowWowStep. It includes six songs featuring the Northern Cree Singers, smoke dance singer Frazer Sundown, and a northern drum from Blackfoot territory called Black Lodge Singers. The album was award with an Indigenous Music Award for Best Instrumental Album in May 2017; the Canadian Organization of Campus Activities (COCA) named him DJ of the Year in June 2017.

DJ Shub's music video for "Indomitable" was shot at the Grand River Champion of Champions Pow Wow in Haudenosaunee territory. It features fancy dancer and techno music producer Classic Roots. The song includes the drums and vocals of the Northern Cree Singers. The video won the 2017 Native American Music Award for Best Music Video. It was nominated for the Best EDM/Dance Video at the 2017 Much Music Video Awards. In 2018, the song "Indomitable" was used as the opening theme for Sacha Baron Cohen's television series Who Is America?.

DJ Shub won the Canadian Screen Award for Best Original Song for "The Trials", a song from the film The Grizzlies which he cowrote with Thomas Lambe and Adam "Hyper-T" Tanuyak, at the 7th Canadian Screen Awards in 2019.

His 2026 album Heritage (Part Two) was preceded by the preview single "I Know", featuring Sebastian Gaskin as a guest vocalist.

== Awards and recognition ==
- 2022: Juno Award Winner for Contemporary Indigenous Artist of the Year
- 2018: Juno nomination for Indigenous Album of the Year
- 2017: Native American Music Award, Best Music Video for "Indomitable Ft. Northern Cree Singers"
- 2017: Indigenous Music Awards, Best Instrumental Album for PowWowStep EP by DJ Shub
- 2017: Much Music Video Awards nomination, Best EDM/Dance Video for "Indomitable ft. Northern Cree Singers"
- 2014: JUNO Awards, Breakthrough Group of the Year for Nation II Nation by A Tribe Called Red
- 2013: Polaris Prize short list for Nation II Nation by A Tribe Called Red (
- 2013: Aboriginal Peoples Choice Music Awards, Best Producer, Best Group/Duo, Best Pop Album, Best Album Cover for Nation II Nation by A Tribe Called Red
