= Northern Cree =

Canadian Cree musical artist

- Origin: Maskwacis, Alberta, Canada
- Genre: Powwow
- Years active: 1982–present

Northern Cree, also known as the Northern Cree Singers, is a powwow and Round Dance drum and singing group based in Maskwacis, Alberta, Canada. Formed in 1982 by Randy Wood, with brothers Charlie and Earl Wood of the Saddle Lake Cree Nation, the group's members originate from the Treaty 6 area. These include Ferlin McGillvary, Steve Wood and Joel Wood. Additional members are Shane Dion, Leroy Whitstone, Penny McGilvery, Jonas Tootoosis, Marlon Deschamps, Conan Yellowbird, Dezi Chocan, Ben Cardinal, Kyle Pasquayak, JohnBoy Moosomin, Randall Paskemin, and Mickso Deschamps.

Northern Cree has performed regularly at folk festivals Native American powwows across Canada and the United States and has won hundreds of championship powwow singing titles.

They are the only traditional Canadian Aboriginal group to have been nominated for a Grammy. In 2017, the Singers, along with founder Randy Wood and Tanya Tagaq, won a Juno Award for Classical Album of the Year – Large Ensemble for the album Going Home Star.

== Discography ==
Northern Cree has released 38 recordings. Many are live recordings on Canyon Records.

Year	Album
1991	Northern Cree Singers, Vol. 1
1991	Northern Cree Singers, Vol. 2
1991	Northern Cree Singers, Vol. 3: Pow-Wow Songs Recorded Live at Fort Duchesne
1993	Northern Cree Singers, Vol. 4: No Word Songs Please: Straight Pow-Wow Songs Recorded Live
1993	Vol. 5: Pow Wow Songs Recorded Live
1994	Vol. 6: Pow Wow Songs Recorded Live
1996	Vol. 7: Pow Wow Songs, Live at Lummi
1996	Vol. 8: Come and Dance — Pow Wow Songs, Live at Whiteriver
1997	Dance Hard! : Pow-Wow Songs Recorded Live at Poundmaker's Lodge
1998	Honor the Eagle Feather: Pow-Wow Songs Recorded Live in Kamloops
1998	It's Time to Round Dance!
1999	Here to Stay
1999	In Our Drum We Trust
1999	Showtime: Round Dance Songs
2000	Rockin' the Rez: Pow-wow Songs Recorded Live at Saddle Lake
2000	Second Song: Dancer's Choice!: Pow-wow Songs Recorded Live at Saddle Lake
2002	Northern Cree and Friends, Vol. 1: Round Dance Songs Recorded Live
2002	Round Dance Jam
2002	Still Rezin′
2003	Northern Cree and Friends, Vol. 2: Honoring Singers and Songmakers
2004	Northern Cree and Friends, Vol. 3: Honoring Singers and Songmakers
2004	Rezonate: Pow-wow Songs Recorded Live at Saddle Lake
2005	Nikamo = "Sing": Pow-wow Songs Recorded Live at Samson
2005	Northern Cree and Friends, Vol. 4: Slide and Sway
2006	Northern Cree and Friends, Vol. 5: Long Winter Nights: Round Dance "Live!"
2006	Stay Red: Pow-wow Songs Recorded Live at Pullman
2007	Northern Cree and Friends, Vol. 6: Calling All Dancers
2007	Northern Cree and Friends, Vol. 7: Dancin' til Sunrise
2008	Red Rock: Pow-wow Songs Recorded Live at Muckleshoot
2009	True Blue
2010	Temptations: Cree Round Dance Songs
2011	Drum Boy: Mistikwaskihk Napesis: Pow-wow Songs Recorded Live at Saddle Lake
2012	Dancerz Groove: Cree Round Dance Songs
2013	Loyalty to the Drum: Pow-wow Songs Recorded Live in Rocky Boy
2014	Breaking Boundaries: Pow-wow Songs Recorded Live at Red Mountain
2014	Ewipihcihk (ᐁᐏᐱᐦᒋᐦᐠ) (Note: Title translates to "to go Round Dancing (with)," or, "he/she goes Round Dancing (with)"): Cree Round Dance Songs
2016	It's a Cree Thing: Cree Round Dance Songs
2017	Mîyo Kekisepa, Make a Stand: Pow-Wow Songs Recorded Live at Red Mountain
2018	Nîtisânak (Brothers and Sister): Pow-Wow Songs Recorded Live at Shakopee
2019	When It's Cold: Cree Round Dance Songs
2022	Drums In the Pines: Pow-Wow Songs Recorded Live in Keshena

=== Other appearances ===
Northern Cree was featured in the 1999 film Grey Owl. They are featured on the album Gathering of Nations Pow Wow 1999, which won a Grammy in 2001. The group is featured in the song and music video "Indomitable" by DJ Shub, which was nominated for Best EDM/Dance Video in the 2017 iHeartRadio Much Music Video Awards and won Best Music Video in the 2017 Native American Music Awards. In 2017, the group performed live as part of the pre-telecast for the 60th Annual Grammy Awards, which was the first time that traditional Native American or Indigenous music was performed on the Grammy stage.

Northern Cree is featured on the CDs which accompany David Bouchard's children's books in Cree and English: Nokum Is My Teacher (2006) and The Drum Calls Softly (2008), both on Red Deer Press.

== Awards and nominations ==
Year	Award	Category	Nominated work	Result	Ref
2001	Native American Music Awards	Best Pow Wow Album		Won	
2002	Grammy Awards	Best Native American Music Album	Rockin' the Rez	Nominated	
2004	Grammy Awards	Best Native American Music Album	Still Rezin'	Nominated	
2004	Native American Music Awards	Best Compilation Recording		Won	
2006	Canadian Aboriginal Music Awards	Best Contemporary Pow-Wow Album	Nikamo – "Sing!"	Won	
2006	Canadian Aboriginal Music Awards	Best Hand Drum Album	Northern Cree & Friends, Vol. 4 – Slide & Sway	Won	
2007	Grammy Awards	Best Native American Music Album	Northern Cree & Friends, Vol. 5: Long Winter Nights	Nominated	
2007	Juno Awards	Aboriginal Recording of the Year	Stay Red	Nominated	
2007	Native American Music Awards	Best Pow Wow Album		Won	
2009	Grammy Awards	Best Native American Music Album	Red Rock: Pow-Wow Songs Recorded Live at Muckleshoot	Nominated	
2010	Grammy Awards	Best Native American Music Album	True Blue	Nominated	
2011	Grammy Awards	Best Native American Music Album	Temptations: Cree Round Dance Songs	Nominated	
2017	Grammy Awards	Best Regional Roots Music Album	It's a Cree Thing	Nominated	
2017	Indigenous Music Awards	Lifetime Achievement Award		Won	
2017	Juno Awards	Classical Album of the Year – Large Ensemble	Going Home Star	Won	
2017	Native American Music Awards	Best Music Video		Won	
2017	Native American Music Awards	Best Pow Wow Recording		Won	
2018	Grammy Awards	Best Regional Roots Music Album	Miyo Kekisepa, Make a Stand [Live]	Nominated	
2019	Juno Awards	Indigenous Music Album of the Year	Nitisanak - Brothers and Sister	Nominated	
2020	Grammy Awards	Best Regional Roots Music Album	When It's Cold - Cree Round Dance Songs	Nominated	
2026	Polaris Music Prize	SOCAN Polaris Song Prize	"Put Your Feathers On" with Blue Moon Marquee	Longlisted	
