= Juno Awards =

Annual Canadian music achievement awards

The Juno Awards
- Current: Juno Awards of 2026
- Logo for the Juno Awards
- Awarded for: Outstanding achievements in the music industry
- Country: Canada
- Presented by: The Canadian Academy of Recording Arts and Sciences
- First award: 23 February 1970; 56 years ago (as Gold Leaf Awards)
- Website: www.junoawards.ca

Television/radio coverage
- Network: CBC (1975–1987, 1989–2001, 2018–present); CTV (2002–2017)

The Juno Awards (stylized as JUNOS), referred to as the Junos, are awards presented by the Canadian Academy of Recording Arts and Sciences to recognize outstanding achievements in Canada's music industry. They are the Canadian equivalent of the United States' Grammy Awards. Alongside the Canadian Screen Awards, they are considered one of the main annual Canadian entertainment award shows. New members of the Canadian Music Hall of Fame are also inducted as part of the awards ceremonies.

== History ==
The Juno Awards were originally called the RPM Gold Leaf Awards named after RPM Magazine. The winners would be announced in RPM magazine before awards night. The first ceremony was held on 23 February 1970, to honour the musical accomplishments of performers for the year 1969, and the trophy resembled a metronome. But the name was changed in honour of Pierre Juneau, the first president of the Canadian Radio-television and Telecommunications Commission (CRTC) and former president of the Canadian Broadcasting Corporation (CBC). Juneau was an outspoken advocate for Canadian content regulations.

In 1964 RPM magazine began polling its readers to determine which artists and groups they considered the best in Canada. RPM announced the results of these polls each December. There were no formal award ceremonies.

Record label owner Stan Klees met with RPM founder Walt Grealis to plan a formal music industry awards ceremony. Instead of merely publishing the award results in RPM, presentations would be made at a physical venue. The first ceremony was the Gold Leaf Awards which took place on 23 February 1970 in Toronto, Ontario.

Later that year RPM invited its readers to suggest a new name for these awards. The name "Juneau" was submitted, in honour of Pierre Juneau, the first head of the CRTC. Juneau was instrumental in establishing Canadian content regulations for broadcasters to promote Canadian musicians. That name became shortened to Juno and by 1971, the awards ceremonies were referred to as the "Juno Awards".

From 1970 to 1973, RPM announced the winners before the awards night. From 1974, the award winners were not made public until the Juno ceremonies. Music industry representatives formed an advisory committee for the Junos in 1974 which became the Canadian Music Awards Association the following year. This organization assumed full management and operation of the Juno Awards from 1977 and became the Canadian Academy of Recording Arts and Sciences (CARAS).

The Junos were first televised across Canada in 1975 on CBC Television. Primary ceremonies continued to be broadcast on CBC until 2001, moving to CTV Television Network (CTV) from 2002 to 2017 inclusive. The broadcast returned to CBC from 2018 onward.

The Canadian Music Hall of Fame was introduced in 1978. In 1979, the statuette's name was officially changed from RPM Annual Gold Leaf Award to the Juno Award, and featured then-Prime Minister of Canada Pierre Trudeau as a presenter. Other Prime Ministers have attended ceremonies, including Stephen Harper, Justin Trudeau, and Mark Carney.

Joni Mitchell was inducted into the Canadian Music Hall of Fame by Pierre Trudeau in 1982.

Initially, the awards were presented during the early part of each year. In 1984, organizers postponed that year's awards until December. CARAS maintained a late-year scheduling until January 1988 when it noted the declining viewership of the Juno broadcasts and reverted to an early year awards schedule. CARAS postponed that year's Juno Awards until 12 March 1989, so there was no ceremony in the 1988 calendar year.

In 1991, the awards were hosted in Vancouver, the first time the Juno ceremonies were conducted outside Toronto. That year also marked the introduction of a category for rap recordings.

For the first time the 1995 Awards, held in Hamilton's Copps Coliseum, were open to the public. This marked the 25th anniversary of the Junos.

In 1996 the four-CD, 77-song box set Oh What a Feeling: A Vital Collection of Canadian Music and a book were released to mark the 25th anniversary of the Juno Awards. The box set featured popular songs by Canadian artists from the 1960s to 1990s sold over one million copies and was certified diamond. In 2001, a second four-CD box set was released to celebrate the 30th anniversary of the awards. In 2006, a third box set was released to celebrate the 35th anniversary which was certified platinum in Canada.

CARAS transferred the broadcast rights to the Juno Awards from the CBC to CTV for the 2002 ceremonies. 2006 marked the first time the Junos were broadcast internationally through MTV2 in the United States and several affiliated MTV channels in other nations. The telecast of the 2006 Juno Awards was available to approximately 250 million people.

The Allan Waters Humanitarian Award honouring media icon Allan Waters was inaugurated in 2006. The first artist to be given this honour was Bruce Cockburn.

At the 2007 ceremony, host Nelly Furtado made Juno history by being the first nominee with multiple nominations to win every award for which she was nominated. These included the two most prestigious honours, Album of the Year and Artist of the Year.

Launched in January 2013, Juno TV is a digital channel featuring original and archival content specific to the Juno Awards and its nominated artists and Canadian celebrities such as Alanis Morissette, The Weeknd, Lights, and Rush. Juno TV delivers new content weekly, presenting content on a year-round basis.

On 18 April 2017, CARAS president Allan Reid announced that the ceremonies would return to CBC for the first time since 2002, for at least the next six years. He said he wanted to collaborate with the CBC to bolster a year-round presence for the Juno Awards as a platform for promoting Canadian music.

The 2020 event was cancelled because of the COVID-19 pandemic in Canada, but later replaced by an online ceremony on 29 June.

All honours earned by Buffy Sainte-Marie were rescinded by CARAS on 7 March 2025, after she confirmed she never attained Canadian citizenship.

== Trophy ==
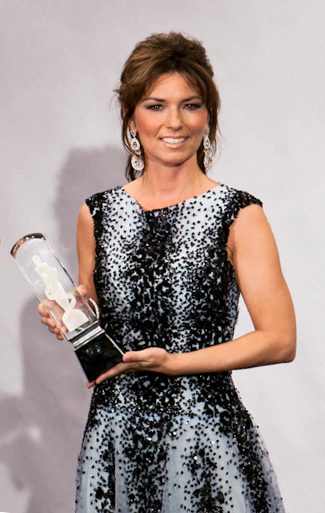
Shania Twain holds a 2011 Juno Award trophy.

Stan Klees developed the first Juno trophies for the inaugural presentations in 1970. These were constructed from walnut wood, stood 18 inches (46 cm) tall and resembled a metronome. When CBC televised the ceremonies in 1975, the award was constructed from acrylic instead of wood while retaining a metronome shape. The trophy was given minor modifications in succeeding years. These included a reduction in size for ease of handling, and changes to the inlay design such as a special 1996 emblem to signify the 25th anniversary.

In 2000 following criticism from producers that the existing award trophy did not have an attractive television appearance, CARAS commissioned a redesigned award from Stoney Creek, Ontario, artist Shirley Elford. After reviewing three designs, two of which were patterned after the existing trophy, a new trophy design was selected featuring a glass human figure surrounded by a nickel-coated spiral symbolic of a musical staff on an aluminum base. A few display statuettes were circulated for presentation during the ceremonies. Within months, winners received their personalized and individually made trophies from Elford.

In October 2010, CARAS unveiled a new award design to be used from 2011 on. Elford had developed cancer and was no longer able to produce individual Juno trophies. The new design, manufactured by Crystal Sensations of Markham, ON, featured a solid crystal tower containing a subsurface laser engraving depicting a spiral-wrapped human figure resembling the previous statuette. Elford died in November 2011.

== Nomination process ==
Specific award categories and their descriptions vary from year to year reflecting changes and developments in the music industry. In 1964 there were 16 categories, and in 2017 there were 42. Judging panels change each year. They include people from different areas of the music industry and regions of the country. An advisory committee oversees each category to ensure that all the submissions meet the required criteria.

The nominations for each year's Junos are based on an eligibility period which lasts for 13 to 14 months, ending on the mid-November prior to the awards ceremony. For example, the eligibility period of the 2010 Juno Awards was from 1 September 2008 to 13 November 2009. Musicians or their representatives submit music released during the eligibility period to CARAS, designated for the appropriate nomination categories. Nominations other than for the International Album of the Year may only be awarded to Canadians who have lived in Canada during the last six months of the eligibility period, and are deemed Canadian by birth, passport or immigration status.

Following the close of the eligibility period, CARAS conducts an initial vote by its members to establish the list of nominees in most categories. Sales figures determined the nominees for Album of the Year and International Album of the Year. Sales along with a jury vote determine the New Artist of the Year, New Group of the Year, Rock Album of the Year and Pop Album of the Year. Sales and a CARAS member vote determine the nominations for Artist of the Year and Group of the Year.

After the nominees list is published, another voting round is conducted to determine the winners of most categories. Voting for the Juno Fan Choice Award is open to the public and closes after the first hour of the televised ceremony, while voting on general categories is limited to CARAS members. Winners in genre-specific or specialty categories are determined by specially appointed CARAS juries. As of 2010, ballots are audited by the major Big Four accounting firms PricewaterhouseCoopers.

== Ceremonies ==
The Juno Awards events were not conducted outside Toronto until 1991. Since then, the ceremonies have been hosted throughout Canada, reaching both coasts. The provinces of New Brunswick, Prince Edward Island, Quebec, Yukon, Nunavut, and the Northwest Territories, have yet to play host to the Junos. In recent years, the various locations often host a number of supporting events and festivals surrounding the awards. In addition, a "Juno Awards Gala" is held before the ceremony to present most of the categories.

Juno Awards Dates and Locations
| Year | Date | Venue | City | Host(s) | Network | Ref. |
| 1970 | 23 February | St. Lawrence Hall | Toronto | George Wilson | None | |
| 1971 | 22 February | St. Lawrence Hall | Toronto | George Wilson | None | |
| 1972 | 28 February | Inn on the Park | Toronto | George Wilson | None | |
| 1973 | 12 March | Inn on the Park | Toronto | George Wilson | CBC Radio | |
| 1974 | 25 March | Inn on the Park | Toronto | George Wilson | None | |
| 1975 | 24 March | Canadian National Exhibition | Toronto | Paul Anka | CBC Television | |
| 1976 | 15 March | Ryerson Polytechnic Institute | Toronto | John Allan Cameron | CBC Television | |
| 1977 | 16 March | Royal York Hotel | Toronto | David Steinberg | CBC Television | |
| 1978 | 29 March | Harbour Castle Hilton | Toronto | David Steinberg | CBC Television | |
| 1979 | 21 March | Harbour Castle Hilton | Toronto | Burton Cummings | CBC Television | |
| 1980 | 2 April | Harbour Castle Hilton | Toronto | Burton Cummings | CBC Television | |
| 1981 | 5 February | O'Keefe Centre | Toronto | Frank Mills with Ginette Reno/Ronnie Hawkins with Carroll Baker/Andrea Martin with John Candy | CBC Television | |
| 1982 | 14 April | Harbour Castle Hilton | Toronto | Burton Cummings | None | |
| 1983 | 5 April | Harbour Castle Hilton | Toronto | Burton Cummings and Alan Thicke | CBC Television | |
| 1984 | 5 December | Exhibition Place | Toronto | Joe Flaherty and Andrea Martin | CBC Television | |
| 1985 | 4 November | Harbour Castle Hilton | Toronto | Andrea Martin and Martin Short | CBC Television | |
| 1986 | 10 November | Harbour Castle Hilton | Toronto | Howie Mandel | CBC Television | |
| 1987 | 2 November | O'Keefe Centre | Toronto | Howie Mandel | CBC Television | |
| 1988 | Not held | | | | | |
| 1989 | 12 March | O'Keefe Centre | Toronto | Andre-Philippe Gagnon | CBC Television | |
| 1990 | 18 March | O'Keefe Centre | Toronto | Rick Moranis | CBC Television | |
| 1991 | 3 March | Queen Elizabeth Theatre | Vancouver | Paul Shaffer | CBC Television | |
| 1992 | 29 March | O'Keefe Centre | Toronto | Rick Moranis | CBC Television | |
| 1993 | 21 March | O'Keefe Centre | Toronto | Celine Dion | CBC Television | |
| 1994 | 20 March | O'Keefe Centre | Toronto | Roch Voisine | CBC Television | |
| 1995 | 26 March | Copps Coliseum | Hamilton | This Hour Has 22 Minutes cast | CBC Television | |
| 1996 | 10 March | Copps Coliseum | Hamilton | Anne Murray | CBC Television | |
| 1997 | 9 March | Copps Coliseum | Hamilton | Jann Arden | CBC Television | |
| 1998 | 22 March | General Motors Place | Vancouver | Jason Priestley; Shari Ulrich & Bill Henderson (off-air awards hosts) | CBC Television | |
| 1999 | 7 March | Copps Coliseum | Hamilton | Mike Bullard | CBC Television | |
| 2000 | 12 March | SkyDome | Toronto | The Moffatts | CBC Television | |
| 2001 | 4 March | Copps Coliseum | Hamilton | Rick Mercer | CBC Television | |
| 2002 | 14 April | Mile One Centre | St. John's | Barenaked Ladies | CTV Television Network | |
| 2003 | 6 April | Corel Centre | Ottawa | Shania Twain | CTV Television Network | |
| 2004 | 4 April | Rexall Place | Edmonton | Alanis Morissette | CTV Television Network | |
| 2005 | 3 April | MTS Centre | Winnipeg | Brent Butt | CTV Television Network | |
| 2006 | 2 April | Halifax Metro Centre | Halifax | Pamela Anderson | CTV Television Network | |
| 2007 | 1 April | Credit Union Centre | Saskatoon | Nelly Furtado | CTV Television Network | |
| 2008 | 6 April | Pengrowth Saddledome | Calgary | Russell Peters | CTV Television Network | |
| 2009 | 29 March | General Motors Place | Vancouver | Russell Peters | CTV Television Network | |
| 2010 | 18 April | Mile One Centre | St. John's | Various | CTV Television Network | |
| 2011 | 27 March | Air Canada Centre | Toronto | Drake | CTV Television Network | |
| 2012 | 1 April | Scotiabank Place | Ottawa | William Shatner | CTV Television Network | |
| 2013 | 21 April | Brandt Centre | Regina | Michael Bublé | CTV Television Network | |
| 2014 | 30 March | MTS Centre | Winnipeg | Classified, Johnny Reid, and Serena Ryder | CTV Television Network | |
| 2015 | 15 March | FirstOntario Centre | Hamilton | Jacob Hoggard | CTV Television Network | |
| 2016 | 3 April | Scotiabank Saddledome | Calgary | Jann Arden and Jon Montgomery | CTV Television Network | |
| 2017 | 2 April | Canadian Tire Centre | Ottawa | Bryan Adams and Russell Peters | CTV Television Network | |
| 2018 | 25 March | Rogers Arena | Vancouver | Michael Bublé | CTV Television Network | |
| 2019 | 17 March | Budweiser Gardens | London | Sarah McLachlan | CTV Television Network | |
| 2020 | 29 June | N/A | Virtual | Odario Williams and Damhnait Doyle | CBC Gem | |
| 2021 | 6 June | Rebel Nightclub | Toronto | Angeline Tetteh-Wayoe | CBC Television | |
| 2022 | 15 May | Budweiser Stage | Toronto | Simu Liu | CBC Television | |
| 2023 | 13 March | Rogers Place | Edmonton | Simu Liu | CBC Television | |
| 2024 | 24 March | Scotiabank Centre | Halifax | Nelly Furtado | CBC Television | |
| 2025 | 30 March | Rogers Arena | Vancouver | Michael Bublé | CBC Television | |
| 2026 | 29 March | TD Coliseum | Hamilton | Mae Martin | CBC Television | |
| 2027 | 4 April | Canada Life Centre | Winnipeg | Carly Rae Jepsen | CBC Television | |

== Live performances ==
Beginning in 1975 when the CBC began to televise the Junos live performances were featured throughout the show. The Canadian Music Hall of Fame was introduced in 1978. These are the performers who appeared during the show and those who were inducted into the Canadian Music Hall of fame.

Juno Awards Performances/Canadian Music Hall of Fame Inductee(s)
| Year | Date | Performers |
| 1975 | 24 March | Paul Anka, Susan Jacks, Andy Kim, Diane King, Anne Murray, The Stampeders |
| 1976 | 15 March | Caroll Baker, Dan Hill, Valdy |
| 1977 | 16 March | Caroll Baker, Keith Barrie, André Gagnon, Patsy Gallant, Lavender Hill Mob, Colleen Peterson/ Al Cherney, THP Orchestra, Ian Tyson |
| 1978 | 29 March | Burton Cummings, Lisa Dal Bello, Patsy Gallant, The Good Brothers, Dan Hill, Robbie and Cheryl Ray, Rush, Grant Smith, Oscar Peterson, Guy Lombardo |
| 1979 | 21 March | Claudja Barry, Chilliwack, Burton Cummings, Nick Gilder, Ginette Reno/Boss Brass, Touloise, Gino Vannelli, Ronnie Prophet/Myrna Lorrie/Mercey Brothers/Roxanne Goday |
| 1980 | 2 April | Caroll Baker, Burton Cummings, France Jolie, Gordon Lightfoot, Frank Mills, Murray McLauchlan, Carole Pope, Rough Trade, Max Webster |
| 1981 | 5 February | Caroll Baker, Patrice Black, John Candy, Ronnie Hawkins, Andrea Martin, Frank Mills, Powder Blues Band, Ginette Reno, Graham Shaw, Diane Tell, Shari Ulrich |
| 1982 | 14 April | Liona Boyd, Chilliwack, Burton Cummings, B. B. Gabor, Ronnie Hawkins, Rough Trade, Rovers |
| 1983 | 5 April | Claude Dubois, Family Brown, Gordon Lightfoot, Loverboy, The Nylons, David Roberts, The Spoons |
| 1984 | 5 December | The Parachute Club, Honeymoon Suite, Jane Siberry, Bob Schneider, Platinum Blonde, Rob McConnell and the Boss Brass, Sherry Kean, Diane Tell, Véronique Béliveau |
| 1985 | 4 November | David Foster, Bryan Adams, Tina Turner, k.d. lang, Lube, Canadian Brass, Kim Mitchell, Liberty Silver |
| 1986 | 10 November | Corey Hart, Luba, Honeymoon Suite, Glass Tiger, Gordon Lightfoot, Kim Mitchell, Martine St. Clair, Liberty Silver, Glen Ricketts, Billy Newton-Davis, Kenny Hamilton, Erroll Starr |
| 1987 | 2 November | Gino Vannelli, The Nylons, Rock and Hyde, Lube, Gowan, Celine Dion, The Partland Brothers, Erroll Starr, Kim Richardson |
| 1988 | No awards | |
| 1989 | 12 March | Tom Cochrane and Red Rider, Crowded House, Glass Tiger, Jeff Healey Band, Colin James, k.d lang and the Reclines, Rita MacNeil, The Band, Blue Rodeo |
| 1990 | 18 March | Cowboy Junkies with special guest Lyle Lovett, Jeff Healey Band (with special guests), Maestro Fresh-Wes, Kim Mitchell, Alannah Myles, Rod Stewart, Milli Vanilli |
| 1991 | 3 March | Alias, Blue Rodeo, Celine Dion, MC Hammer, Colin James, The Northern Pikes, Michelle Wright, Prairie Oyster, Leonard Cohen tribute featuring Aaron Neville, Suzanne Vega and Jennifer Warnes |
| 1992 | 29 March | Bryan Adams, Tom Cochrane, Crash Test Dummies, George Fox, Ofra Harnoy, Loreena McKennitt, Sarah McLachlan, Ian & Sylvia Tyson tribute featuring Blue Rodeo, Molly Johnson, Kashtin, Andy Maize, Neil Osborne, Jane Siberry |
| 1993 | 21 March | Barenaked Ladies, Leonard Cohen, Celine Dion, Kaleefah, Rita MacNeil, Michelle Wright, One Smokin' Hot All-Star Jazz Band Star-Studded Tribute to Anne Murray, The Tragically Hip (taped performance from Australia) |
| 1994 | 20 March | Blue Rodeo, Celine Dion, Kanatan Aski, James Keelaghan, Colin Linden, Lawrence Martin, The Rankin Family, Snow, Roch Voisine |
| 1995 | 26 March | Barenaked Ladies, Crash Test Dummies, Celine Dion, David Foster, Charlie Major, Sarah McLauchlan, Moist, Prairie Oyster, Ashley MacIsaac, Colin James and The Little Big Band, Quartette Hall of Fame tribute to Buffy Sainte-Marie |
| 1996 | 10 March | k.d. Lang, Alanis Morissette, Our Lady Peace, Jann Arden, The Rankin Family, Anne Murray, Gordon Lightfoot, Tom Cochrane |
| 1997 | 9 March | Paul Brandt, Terri Clark, Celine Dion, Maynard Ferguson, Taro Hakase, I Mother Earth, Moe Koffman, Amanda Marshall, Ashley MacIsaac, Rob McConnell and the Boss Brass, Moist |
| 1998 | 22 March | Jann Arden, Denna Crott Trio, Econoline Crush, Diana Krall, Leahy, Sarah McLachlan, Ron Sexsmith, Shania Twain |
| 1999 | 7 March | Barenaked Ladies (via satellite from Australia); Jesse Cook with Bill Katsioutas; Arturo Avalos, Maury Lafoy and Davide Direnzo; Deborah Cox, Celine Dion featuring Hamilton Children's Choir; Colin James and the Little Big Band; Love Inc. featuring Deborah Cox; Natalie McMaster, The Moffatts, Bruno Pelletier, The Philosopher Kings, Rascalz featuring Choclair, Kardinal Offishal, Thrust, Checkmate, Sloan |
| 2000 | 12 March | Barenaked Ladies, Choclair, Our Lady Peace, Great Big Sea, Diana Krall, Chantal Kreviazuk, Amanda Marshall, Prozzäk, Sharon Riley & Faith Chorale, The Moffatts |
| 2001 | 4 March | Jann Arden, Baby Blue Soundcrew, Jully Black, Terri Clark, Choclair, Deborah Cox, Dream Warriors, Lara Fabian, Nelly Furtado, Ghetto Concept, Sarah Harmer, Maestro, Michie Mee, Snow, SoulDecision, The Guess Who, The Moffatts, Rascalz, Treble Charger, Barenaked Ladies (via satellite) |
| 2002 | 14 April | Barenaked Ladies, Nelly Furtado, Great Big Sea, Diana Krall, Amanda Marshall, Alanis Morissette, Nickelback, Shaggy, Sum 41, Swollen Members |
| 2003 | 6 April | Avril Lavigne, Blue Rodeo, Our Lady Peace, Remy Shand, Sam Roberts, Shania Twain, Swollen Members, Tom Cochrane |
| 2004 | 4 April | Barenaked Ladies, Billy Talent, Blackie and the Rodeo Kings, Michael Bublé, Kathleen Edwards, Finger Eleven, Nelly Furtado, Ben Heppner, In Essence, Avril Lavigne, Aaron Lines, Sarah McLachlan, Nickelback, Simple Plan, Three Days Grace, Whitefish Jrs. |
| 2005 | 3 April | Randy Bachman, Billy Talent, Burton Cummings, Feist, Fresh I.E., k-os, Chantal Kreviazuk, k.d lang, Kalan Porter, Nathan, Simple Plan, Sum 41, The Tragically Hip, The Wailin' Jennys, The Waking Eyes |
| 2006 | 6 April | Bedouin Soundclash, The Black Eyed Peas, Broken Social Scene, Bryan Adams, Buck 65, Coldplay, Divine Brown, Hedley, Massari, Michael Bublé. Nickelback |
| 2007 | 1 April | Nelly Furtado, Alexisonfire, City and Colour, DJ Champion, Three Days Grace, Tragically Hip, k-os, Billy Talent, Gregory Charles |
| 2008 | 6 April | Avril Lavigne, Feist, Finger Eleven, Hedley, Jully Black, Measha Brueggergosman, Paul Brandt, Aaron Lines, Shane Yellowbird, Johnny Reid, George Canyon, Gord Bamford, Anne Murray, Sarah Brightman, Jann Arden, Michael Bublé |
| 2009 | 29 March | Nickelback, Divine Brown, Crystal Shawanda, Great Big Sea, Simple Plan, The Stills, Bryan Adams with Kathleen Edwards, Sam Roberts, City and Colour, ECCODEK, Sarah McLachlan, Serena Ryder, Hawksley Workman, Gord Downie |
| 2010 | 18 April | Justin Bieber, Drake, Billy Talent, Blue Rodeo, Michael Bublé, Great Lake Swimmers, K'naan, Classified, Metric, Johnny Reid |
| 2011 | 27 March | Arcade Fire, Broken Social Scene, Chromeo, Down With Webster, Hedley, Johnny Reid, Sarah McLachlan |
| 2012 | 1 April | Blue Rodeo, City and Colour, deadmau5, Feist, Hey Rosetta!, Anjulie, Dallas Green, Sarah McLachlan and Jim Cuddy, K'Naan with Simple Plan |
| 2013 | 21 April | Coachella, Carly Rae Jepsen, Michael Bublé, Serena Ryder, Billy Talent, The Sheepdogs, Hannah Georgas, Classified with David Myles |
| 2014 | 30 March | Arcade Fire via pre-taped segment, Tegan and Sara, OneRepublic, Sarah McLachlan, The Sheepdogs with Matt Mays, Tim Hicks and Travis Good, Classified, Serena Ryder, Robin Thicke, Walk Off The Earth, Brett Kissel, Dean Brody, Gord Bamford |
| 2015 | 15 March | Arkells, deadmau5, Hedley, Kiesza, Lights, Magic!, Shawn Mendes, Alanis Morissette, Sam Roberts Band |
| 2016 | 3 April | Buffy Sainte-Marie, Lights, Alessia Cara, Bryan Adams, Coleman Hell, Dean Brody, Dear Rouge, Scott Helman, Shawn Hook, Shawn Mendes, The Weeknd, and Whitehorse |
| 2017 | 2 April | Alessia Cara featuring Zedd, Arkells, A Tribe Called Red, Billy Talent, Bryan Adams, Dallas Smith, July Talk, Ruth B., Shawn Mendes, The Strumbellas, and Sarah McLachlan. |
| 2018 | 25 March | Sarah Harmer, Kevin Hearn and City and Colour; Arkells, Daniel Caesar, Diana Krall with guest Michael Bublé, Felix Cartal, Jessie Reyez, Lights, Shawn Hook, The Jerry Cans, Arcade Fire, Northern Touch Allstars: Rascalz, Checkmate, Kardinal Offishall, Thrust and Choclair; Barenaked Ladies and Steven Page with original member Andy Creeggan joined by friends Jann Arden, Jim Cuddy, The Jerry Cans, City & Colour, Eric McCormack |
| 2019 | 17 March | Arkells, Bahamas, NAV, Sarah McLachlan, Cœur de pirate and Loud, Corey Hart, Jeremy Dutcher with Blake Pouliot, Loud Luxury and The Reklaws. |
| 2020 | 29 June | Alessia Cara, iskwē, Neon Dreams and The Dead South |
| 2021 | 6 June | Justin Bieber, JP Saxe and Julia Michaels, Michie Mee, Maestro Fresh Wes, Kardinal Offishall, Jully Black, Nav, Jann Arden, Ali Gatie with Tate McRae, William Prince with Serena Ryder, Jessie Reyez, The Tragically Hip with Feist |
| 2022 | 15 May | Arkells, Tesher, Lauren Spencer-Smith, Haviah Mighty, Charlotte Cardin, Mustafa, Avril Lavigne, DJ Shub & Snotty Nose Rez Kids, Deborah Cox, bbno$ and Arcade Fire |
| 2023 | 13 March | Tate McRae, AP Dhillon, Tenille Townes, Alexisonfire, Aysanabee with Northern Cree, Bank & Ranx with Preston Pablo, Rêve, Jessie Reyez, Michie Mee, Dream Warriors, Choclair, TOBi and Nickelback |
| 2024 | 24 March | Nelly Furtado, Karan Aujla with Ikky, Jeremy Dutcher with Elisapie and Morgan Toney, TALK, Charlotte Cardin, Alexandra Stréliski with Allison Russell, Aysanabee, Julian Taylor, Logan Staats, Shawnee Kish and William Prince, Josh Ross, Maestro Fresh Wes and The Beaches |
| 2025 | 30 March | Sum 41, Michael Buble, Josh Ross, Snotty Nose Rez Kids, Nemahsis, Aqyila, Tia Wood, Elisapie, Jonita Gandhi, Maestro Fresh Wes, Roxane Bruneau, bbno$ with Priyanka, Peach Pit, Chani Nattan, Inderpal Moga, Jazzy B and Gminxr |
| 2026 | 29 March | Arkells, Grouplove, The Beaches, William Prince, Sarah McLachlan, Allison Russell, Luke Doucet, Melissa McClelland, Jully Black, Alessia Cara, Shawn Desman, Tanya Tagaq, Lido Pimienta, Kardinal Offishall, MICO, Sofia Camara, Cameron Whitcomb, Daniel Caesar and Rush |

== Award categories ==
The "General Field" are awards which are not restricted by music genre.

- The Artist of the Year award is presented to the best individual performer.
- The Group of the Year award is awarded to the best music group performer.
- The Album of the Year award is presented to the performer, featured artists, songwriter(s), and/or production team of a full album if other than the performer.
- The Single of the Year award is presented to the songwriter(s) of a single song.
- The Breakthrough Artist or Group of the Year award is presented to a promising breakthrough performer(s) who in the eligibility year releases the first recording that establishes their public identity (which is not necessarily their first proper release).

Other awards are given for performance and production in specific genres and for other contributions such as artwork and video. Special awards are also given for longer-lasting contributions to the music industry. Award names have changed through the years, most notably the switch in 2003 from the phrase "Best..." to " ... of the year".

Since 2015, Breakthrough Artist of the Year, Album of the Year, and Fan Choice Award are the only categories that are presented at every broadcast. The awards for Breakthrough Artist of the Year and Breakthrough Group of the Year are customarily presented by the Minister of Canadian Heritage.

Beginning with the 2016 ceremony, two new awards categories—Contemporary Roots Album of the Year and Traditional Roots Album of the Year—were introduced to "ensure two genres of music are not competing against each other in the same category".

=== Genre-specific fields ===
Pop

- Pop Album of the Year

Dance/Electronic

- Dance Recording of the Year
- Underground Dance Single of the Year
- Electronic Album of the Year

Contemporary Instrumental & Composing

- Instrumental Album of the Year

Rock

- Rock Album of the Year
- Metal/Hard Music Album of the Year

Alternative & Contemporary

- Alternative Album of the Year
- Adult Alternative Album of the Year
- Adult Contemporary Album of the Year

R&B

- Traditional R&B/Soul Recording of the Year
- Contemporary R&B/Soul Recording of the Year

Rap

- Rap Single of the Year
- Rap Album/EP of the Year

Country

- Country Album of the Year

Jazz

- Jazz Album of the Year – Solo
- Jazz Album of the Year – Group
- Vocal Jazz Album of the Year

Gospel/Contemporary Christian Music

- Contemporary Christian/Gospel Album of the Year

Canadian Roots

- Contemporary Roots Album of the Year
- Traditional Roots Album of the Year
- Blues Album of the Year

Reggae

- Reggae Recording of the Year

Global Music

- Global Music Album of the Year

Children's

- Children's Album of the Year

Comedy

- Comedy Album of the Year

Engineering Field

- Recording Engineer of the Year

Production Field

- Producer of the Year

Songwriting

- Songwriter of the Year
- Songwriter of the Year (Non-Performer)

Classical

- Classical Composition of the Year
- Classical Album of the Year – Solo
- Classical Album of the Year – Small Ensemble
- Classical Album of the Year – Large Ensemble

Music Video/Film

- Video of the Year

Francophone

- Francophone Album of the Year

Indigenous

- Traditional Indigenous Artist of the Year
- Contemporary Indigenous Artist of the Year

South Asian Music

- South Asian Music Recording of the Year

Latin Music

- Latin Music Recording of the Year

Other

- Album Artwork of the Year
- Juno Fan Choice Award
- MusiCounts Teacher of the Year

=== Former Categories ===
- Juno International Achievement Award – awarded from 1992 to 2000
- Juno Award for International Entertainer of the Year – awarded from 1989 to 1993
- Juno Award for Best Selling Single – awarded from 1975 to 1993
- Juno Award for Music DVD of the Year – awarded from 2004 to 2013 – discontinued in 2014
- Juno Award for Traditional Jazz Album of the Year – awarded from 1977 to 2014 – discontinued in 2015
- Juno Award for Roots & Traditional Album of the Year – Solo – awarded between 1989 and 2015
- Juno Award for Roots & Traditional Album of the Year – Group – awarded between 1989 and 2015
- Breakthrough Artist of the Year & Breakthrough Group of the Year – awarded between 1974 and 2024
- Juno Award for Rap Recording of the Year – awarded between 1991 and 2021
- Juno Award for Indigenous Artist or Group of the Year – awarded between 1994 and 2021
- International Album of the Year – awarded between 1975 and 2024

== Criticism ==
The Juno Awards have received criticism from several Canadian artists.

=== Rascalz ===
In 1998, the Rascalz album Cash Crop was nominated for Best Rap Recording. Due to Canadian hip-hop's limited commercial notability, the rap award had never been presented during the main Juno ceremony, instead being relegated to the non-televised technical awards ceremony during the previous evening.

This fact had previously been criticized for creating a barrier to the commercial visibility of Canadian hip-hop. Rascalz, however, alleged that racism was a factor in the award's disadvantageous scheduling, and became the first Canadian hip-hop group to explicitly decline the award on that basis.

Their move sparked considerable media debate about the state of Canadian hip-hop. As a result of the controversy, the Juno Awards moved the rap category to the main ceremony the following year.

=== Matthew Good ===
Matthew Good has won four Juno Awards during his career, but has not attended the ceremonies in any of the years he won. In 2009, he criticized the awards for not promoting Canadian music at the grassroots level, saying, "When it ... isn't kind of this weekend when the Canadian music industry pretends that it's ... not just marketing warehouses for the United States, then sure, I'll be a part of it."

=== Kardinal Offishall ===
At the 2006 Juno Awards, Kardinal Offishall stated that he would not attend the Junos anymore. "I'm not going to be the Juno's monkey no more, I'm not coming back any more." Offishall cited Canadian hip-hop's low profile at that year's awards as the catalyst for his decision. Offishall further stated, "Really, to me it's really atrocious what they do to hip-hop in this country and what they do for the artists... I just feel like the token hip-hop artist from Canada. For urban music in this country, I mean, not only was hip-hop not televised, but also reggae and R&B; to me, it's sickening." Offishall also criticized the Juno Awards for having the American group The Black Eyed Peas perform at that year's ceremony. "I just had enough. They had me perform last night and give away the award – to me it's all a farce, I really can't put up with it anymore. It's not even that it's embarrassing, it's just disappointing. It doesn't matter what you do in this country, for me anyway, they don't recognize what I do. It's just a bunch of garbage so I won't be a part of it anymore." Despite this, Offishall has performed and attended recent editions of the Juno Awards.

=== Drake ===
At the 2011 Juno Awards, Canadian rapper and singer Drake hosted the ceremony; he was also nominated in six categories. However, he lost every award he was nominated for, including Rap Recording of the Year (which was won by Shad). Drake later boycotted the Juno Awards, only appearing 15 years later at the 2026 Juno Awards in a virtual segment honouring Nelly Furtado. During the ceremony, he stated: "To the Junos, because you are honouring one of my dear friends tonight, I will spare you, even though I know you're still thinking about those six awards you gave to Shad when you snubbed Take Care when I hosted the 40th anniversary of your award show. This is about Nelly." While Drake was actually nominated for Thank Me Later, Shad responded by stating that he only won one award at the ceremony.

== Juno Week ==
For several days prior to the weekend award presentations, events are held in the host city as part of a "Juno Week". Local venues host multiple events throughout the week. Events include: Juno Cup, an ice hockey game that pits a team of musicians against a team of National Hockey League players as a fundraiser for MusiCounts, a charitable music education program operated by CARAS, Juno Fan Fare, a meet and greet where fans can meet their favourite Canadian artists, Juno Songwriters' Circle, a chance for Canada's most talented songwriters to tell their stories and play an intimate set in support of MusiCounts, and JUNOfest, a music celebration that showcases local artists at various venues in the host city.

== See also ==
- Canadian Country Music Association
- Music of Canada
- Canadian hip-hop
- Canadian rock
- Canadian content
- Category:Canadian rock music groups
- Category:Canadian musical groups
- List of Canadian musicians
- Category:Music festivals in Canada
- Category:Canadian record labels
