= Juno Award for Classical Composition of the Year =

Classical music award

The Juno Award for "Classical Composition of the Year" has been awarded since 1987, as recognition each year for the best classical music composition in Canada.

== Winners ==
=== Best Classical Composition (1987–2002) ===
Year	Winner	Work	Nominees	Ref.
1987	Malcolm Forsyth	Atayoskewin	Alexina Louie, "Cadenzas"; Oskar Morawetz, "Overture to a Fairy Tale"; André Prévost, "Scherzo for String Orchestra"	
1987	Donald Steven	Pages of Solitary Delights	Alexina Louie, "Cadenzas"; Oskar Morawetz, "Overture to a Fairy Tale"; André Prévost, "Scherzo for String Orchestra"	
1989	Alexina Louie	Songs of Paradise	Brian Cherney, River of Fire; Jacques Hétu, Symphonie No 3; R. Murray Schafer, Concerto for Harpsichord and Eight Wind Instruments; Claude Vivier, Siddartha	
1990	Oskar Morawetz	Concerto for Harp and Chamber Orchestra	Pat Carrabré, Sonata No. 1; Jean Coulthard, Introduction and Three Folk Songs; Gary Kulesha, Third Chamber Concerto; Sid Robinovitch, The Sons of Jacob	
1991	R. Murray Schafer	String Quartet No.5 – 'Rosalind'	Glenn Buhr, Aviravirmayedhi; Michael Colgrass, Chaconne; Sophie-Carmen Eckhardt-Gramatté, Cappriccio-Concertante; R. Murray Schafer, La Cri de Merlin	
1992	Michael Conway Baker	Concerto for Piano & Chamber Orchestra	Patrick Cardy, Virelai; Oskar Morawetz, Memorial to Martin Luther King; R. Murray Schafer, Dream Rainbow Dream Thunder; John Thrower, Improvisation on a Blue Theme	
1993	R. Murray Schafer	Concerto for Flute and Orchestra	Jean Coulthard, "Music to St Cecilia for Organ and Strings"; R. Murray Schafer, "The Darkly Splendid Earth: The Lonely Traveller"; R. Murray Schafer, "Poulenc, Thesus"; Claude Vivier, "Kopernikus"	
1994	Chan Ka Nin	Among Friends	Milton Barnes, "Divertimento for Harp and Strings"; Malcolm Forsyth, "Piano Concerto"; Jean Piché, "Sleight of Hand"; Peter Tiefenbach, "Three Poems"	
1995	Malcolm Forsyth	Sketches from Natal	Jean Coulthard, "Sonata Rhapsody for Viola & Piano"; Chris Harman, "Iridescence"; Alexina Louie, "From the Eastern Gate"; Healey Willan, "Missa Brevis No. 11 Sancti Johannis Baptistae"	
1996	Andrew P. MacDonald	Concerto for Violin and Orchestra	Glenn Buhr, "Piano Concerto"; Harry Freedman, "Touchings"; Alexina Louie, "Music for Heaven and Earth"; Chan Ka Nin, "I Think That I Shall Never See..."	
1997	Harry Somers	Picasso Suite (1964)	Chan Ka Nin, "The Charmer"; Malcolm Forsyth, "Quintette for Winds"; Harry Somers, "Lyric for Orchestra (1960)"; Claude Vivier, "Lonely Child"	
1998	Malcolm Forsyth	Electra Rising	Alexina Louie, "Winter Music"; Colin McPhee, "Symphony No. 2"; R. Murray Schafer, "Adieu, Robert Schumann"; R. Murray Schafer, "Gitanjali"	
1999	Colin McPhee	Concerto for Wind Orchestra	Linda Bouchard, "Songs for an Acrobat"; Malcolm Forsyth, "Tre Vie"; Chris Harman, "Sonata for Viola and Piano"; John Weinzweig, "Wine of Peace: Two Songs for Soprano and Orchestra"	
2000	Alexina Louie	Shattered Night, Shivering Stars	Glenn Buhr, String Quartet No. 1; Glenn Buhr, Winter Poems; Gary Kulesha, The Book of Mirrors; Alexina Louie, Arc	
2001	Oskar Morawetz	From the Diary of Anne Frank	Paul M. Douglas, La Cévenole; Marjan Mozetich, Affairs of the Heart; R. Murray Schafer, Once on a Windy Night; Harry Somers, The Third Piano Concerto	
2002	Chan Ka Nin	Par-çi, par-la	Peter Paul Koprowski, "Concerto for Viola and Orchestra"; Sid Robinovitch, "Suite for Klezmer Band and Orchestra"; Harry Somers, "Serinette"; Owen Underhill, "Love Songs"	

=== Classical Composition of the Year (2003 – Present) ===
Year	Winner	Work	Nominees	Ref.
2003	Bramwell Tovey	Requiem for a Charred Skull	John Estacio, "Test Run"; Christos Hatzis, "Orbiting Garden"; Alexina Louie, "Music for a Thousand Autumns"; Heather Schmidt, "Concerto for Cello"	
2004	R. Murray Schafer	String Quartet No. 8	Norma Beecroft, "Amplified String Quartet with Tape"; Christos Hatzis, "Everlasting Light"; Jacques Hétu, "Piano Concerto No. 2"; R. Murray Schafer, "Credo"	
2005	István Anhalt	The Tents of Abraham	John Estacio, "A Farmer's Symphony"; José Evangelista, "Neuvas monodias espanolas"; Jeffrey Ryan, "Pangaea"; Robert Turner, "Third Symphony"	
2006	Christos Hatzis	String Quartet No. 1 (The Awakening)	Brian Cherney, "Illuminations"; Chan Ka Nin, "Our Finest Hour"; Peter Togni, "Illuminations"; Robert Turner, "Symphony for Strings"	
2007	Denis Gougeon	Clere Vénus	Stephen Chatman, "Varley Suite for Solo Violin"; Neil Currie, "Tumbling Strain"; Harry Somers, "A Midwinter Night's Dream", Harry Somers, "Of Memory and Desire"	
2008	Christos Hatzis	Constantinople (Hatzis)	Brian Current, "This Isn’t Silence"; Oskar Morawetz, "A Child's Cry from Izieu"; Jeffrey Ryan, "Quantum Mechanics"; R. Murray Schafer, "Letters from Mignon"	
2009	John Burge	Flanders Fields Reflections	T. Patrick Carrabré, "From the Dark Reaches"; Timothy Corlis, "Notes Towards a Poem That Can Never Be Written"; Sid Robinovitch, "Song of Songs"; Bramwell Tovey, "Manhattan Music"	
2010	Marjan Mozetich	Lament in the Trampled Garden	Stephen Chatman, "Earth Songs"; Leonard Enns, "Nocturne"; Marjan Mozetich, "Angels in Flight"; Rob Teehan, "Dreams of Flying"	
2011	R. Murray Schafer	Duo for Violin and Piano	Larysa Kuzmenko, "Piano Concerto, 3"; Jocelyn Morlock, "Exaudi"; Clark Ross, "Last Dance"; Peter Togni, "Lamentatio Jeremiae Prophetae"	
2012	Derek Charke	Sepia Fragments	Jacques Hétu, "String Quartet No. 2"; Jeffrey Ryan, "Fugitive Colours"; Heather Schmidt, "Piano Concerto No. 2"; Ann Southam, "Glass Houses #5"	
2013	Vivian Fung	Violin Concerto	Denis Gougeon, "Mutation"; Alexina Louie, "Echoes of Time"; R. Murray Schafer, "Trio for Violin, Viola and Cello"; Howard Shore, The Lord of the Rings Symphony: Six Movements for Orchestra & Chorus	
2014	Allan Gordon Bell	Field Notes	Tim Brady, "Atacama: Symphonie No. 3"; Stephen Chatman, "Magnificat"; James O'Callaghan, "Isomorphia for Orchestra and Electronics"; R. Murray Schafer, "Quatuors à cordes No. 12"	
2015	Brian Current	Airline Icarus	John Estacio, "Triple Concerto for Violin, Cello, Piano and Orchestra"; Gordon Fitzell, "Magister Ludi"; Jacques Hétu, "Sextet, OP. 71"; Alice Ping Yee Ho, "Glistening Pianos"	
2016	Dinuk Wijeratne	Two Pop Songs on Antique Poems	John Burge, "Piano Quartet"; Nicole Lizée, "Bookburners"; Michael Oesterle, "Centennials"; Jordan Pal, "The Afar"	
2017	Jordan Nobles	Immersion	Kati Agócs, "The Debrecen Passion"; Christos Hatzis, "Going Home Star – Truth and Reconciliation"; Ana Sokolović, "And I need a room to receive five thousand people with raised glasses... or... what a glorious day, the birds are singing "halleluia""; Andrew Staniland, "Dark Star Requiem"	
2018	Jocelyn Morlock	My Name is Amanda Todd	Alice Ping Yee Ho, "Cœur à Cœur"; Vincent Ho, "The Shaman"; James Rolfe, "Breathe"; Andrew Staniland, "Phi, Caelestis"	
2019	Ana Sokolović	Golden Slumbers Kiss Your Eyes	Vincent Ho, "Arctic Symphony"; Nicole Lizée, "Katana of Choice"; Cassandra Miller, "About Bach"; Bekah Simms, "Granitic"	
2020	Ana Sokolović	Evta	Rose Bolton, "The Coming of Sobs"; Vincent Ho, "Kickin' It 2.0"; Jared Miller, "Under Sea, Above Sky"; Bekah Simms, "Everything Is...Distorted"	
2021	Samy Moussa	Violin Concerto 'Adrano'	Zosha DiCarti, "Tachitipo"; Anna Höstman, "Harbour"; Alexina Louie, "Take the Dog Sled"; Ana Sokolović, "Commedia dell'arte"	
2022	Keiko Devaux	Arras	Kati Agócs, "Concerto for Violin and Percussion Orchestra"; Dorothy Chang, "Flight"; Jaap Nico Hamburger, "Chamber Symphony No. 2: Children’s War Diaries"; Saman Shahi, "Breathing in the Shadows"	
2023	Bekah Simms	"Bestiary I & II"	Anthony Tan, "An Overall Augmented Sense of Well-Being"; Keyan Emami, "The Black Fish"; Nicole Lizée, "Prayers for Ruins"; Vincent Ho, "Supervillain Études"	
2024	Nicole Lizée	"Don't Throw Your Head in Your Hands"	Amy Brandon, "Simulacra"; Iman Habibi, "Shāhīn-nāmeh, for Voice and Orchestra"; Emilie Cecilia LeBel, "…and the Higher Leaves of the Trees Seemed to Shimmer in the Last of the Sunlight’s Lingering Touch of Them…"; Dinuk Wijeratne, "Portrait of an Imaginary Sibling"	
2025	Deantha Edmunds	"Angmalukisaa"	Keiko Devaux, "L'écoute du perdu : III. « Voix jetées »"; Gabriel Dharmoo, "The Fog in Our Poise"; Vivian Fung, "String Quartet No. 4: Insects and Machines"; Linda Catlin Smith, "Dark Flower"	
2026	Amy Brandon	Cloud Path	Linda Catlin Smith, Linda Catlin Smith: The Complete Piano Solos (1989-2023) Vol. 1 - The Plains; Kevin Lau, Kevin Lau: Kimiko's Pearl; Nicole Lizée, Music for Body-Without-Organs; Andrew Staniland, The Laws of Nature	
