= Gary Kulesha =

Canadian composer, pianist and conductor (born 1954)

Gary Alan Kulesha CM (born 22 August 1954) is a Canadian Juno-nominated composer, pianist, conductor, and educator. Since 1995, he has been Composer Advisor to the Toronto Symphony Orchestra. He has been Composer-in-Residence with the Kitchener-Waterloo Symphony (1988–1992) and the Canadian Opera Company (1993–1995). He was awarded the National Arts Centre Orchestra Composer Award in 2002.

He currently teaches on the music faculty at the University of Toronto, where his notable students have included Vincent Ho, Anna Höstman, Abigail Richardson-Schulte, Bekah Simms, and Andrew Staniland.

He was appointed as a Member of the Order of Canada in 2023.

He is married to fellow composer Larysa Kuzmenko.

== Education ==
Born in Toronto, Kulesha received his musical training at The Royal Conservatory of Music where he earned an associate diploma in piano (1973), a licentiate diploma in music theory (1976), and associate and fellowship diplomas in music composition in 1978. At the conservatory he was a pupil of William G. Andrews and Samuel Dolin. He also studied composition in England from 1978–1981 with John McCabe and in New York City in 1982 with John Corigliano.

== Selected works ==
=== Opera ===
- Red Emma (1986–1995); libretto by Carol Bolt
- The Last Duel (1999–2000); libretto by Michael Albano

=== Orchestra ===
- Divertimento for String Orchestra (1975)
- Concerto for Brass Quintet, Strings, and Piano, after Handel (1976)
- Essay for Orchestra (1977)
- Second Essay for Orchestra (1984)
- Celebration Overture for Orchestra (1985)
- Nocturne for Chamber Orchestra (1985)
- Serenade for String Orchestra (1985)
- Dreams for Orchestra (1988)
- The Midnight Road (Third Essay for Orchestra) (1990)
- The Gates of Time (1991)
- Concertante Dances for Chamber Orchestra (1993)
- Sinfonia for Brass Band, Piano, and Harp (1995)
- Symphony (1997); with 2 conductors; premiered 1998
- The True Colour of the Sky (1999)
- Syllables of Unknown Meaning (2000)
- The Rose (2002); companion piece to Syllables of Unknown Meaning

=== Band and wind ensemble ===
- Stardrive (March in F) for Concert Band (1974)
- Variations for Winds (1975)
- Divertimento for Concert Band (1976)
- Overture for Concert Band (1977, revised 1983)
- Ensembles for Winds (1979)
- March in B Flat for Concert Band (1979)
- Two Pieces for Band (1983)

=== Concertante ===
- Concerto for Tuba and Concert Band or Orchestra (1978–1981)
- Concertino for Flute and Wind Ensemble (1979)
- First Chamber Concerto for Wind Quintet, Brass Quintet and Percussion (1981)
- Second Chamber Concerto for Solo Trumpet, Solo Piano and Wind Ensemble (1982)
- Third Chamber Concerto for Bass Clarinet concertante, 2 Oboes, 2 Clarinets, 2 Bassoons, and 2 Horns (1983)
- Journey into Sunrise for Saxophone Quintet and Orchestra (1987)
- Fourth Chamber Concerto for Brass and Percussion Concertante, Woodwinds, and Strings (1988–1989)
- Concerto for Marimba, Bass Clarinet, and Small Orchestra (1989)
- Fifth Chamber Concerto for Solo Oboe and Thirteen Players (1990–1991)
- Concerto for Recorder and Small Orchestra (1991)
- Concerto for Viola and Chamber Orchestra (1992)
- Concerto for Accordion and Brass Band (1998)
- Concerto for Violin and Orchestra (1998)
- Partita for Piano and String Orchestra (1999)
- Concerto for Strings, Harp, and Percussion (2001)
- Sixth Chamber Concerto for Oboe, English Horn, Basson, Contrabassoon, 2 Violins, Viola, Cello, and Double Bass (2002)
- Second Concerto for Violin and Chamber Orchestra (2002)
- Cello Concerto (2005, written for Shauna Rolston)
- Concerto for Trumpet, Horn and Trombone, with Brass Band (2007-8)
- Concerto for Oboe and Orchestra (2020)

=== Electro-Acoustic ===
- Angels for Marimba and Tape (1983)
- Complex for Electric Bass and Tape (1986)
- Demons for Tuba and Tape (1987–1988)
- Ghosts for Bass Clarinet, Piano or Vibraphone, Tape, and Live Electronics (1988)
- Toccata for Solo Percussion and Tape (1989)
- Cages for Solo Percussion and Tape (2004)

=== Chamber music ===
- Trio for Violin, Viola and Cello (1971)
- Sonatina for Tuba and Piano (1972)
- A Study in Time for Tuba and Piano (1972)
- The Green Apple Two-Step for Tuba and Piano (1973)
- Divertimento for Brass Quintet (1973)
- Variations on a Theme by Paganini for Trumpet and Piano (1974, rev. 1982)
- Humoreske for Tuba and Piano (1974)
- Burlesque for Tuba and Piano
- Sonata for Horn, Tuba and Piano (1975)
- Visions for Tuba and Piano (1975)
- Three Lyric Pieces for Recorder (or Flute) and Piano (or Organ)
- Prelude and Fugue for Trumpet and Piano (1976)
- Bohemian Dance for Tuba and Piano (1976)
- Sonata for Tuba and Organ (1976)
- Three Complacencies for Bass Clarinet and Tuba (1976)
- Duo for Bass Clarinet and Piano (1977)
- Divertimento for Brass Quartet (or Quintet) (1977)
- Sonata for Trumpet, Tuba, and Piano (1978)
- 3 Caprices for Solo Violin (1977–1978)
- Trio for Flute, Cello, and Piano (1979)
- Concertante Music for Soprano Saxophone and Woodwind Quintet (1979)
- Suite "The Grand Canyon" for Two Trumpets (1979)
- Attitudes for Clarinet and Piano (1980)
- Mysterium Coniunctionis for Clarinet, Bass Clarinet and Piano (1980)
- Divertimento for Brass Trio (1980)
- Two Pieces for Brass Quintet (1980)
- Secrets for Flute and Piano (1980)
- Song and Dance for Violin and Piano (1980)
- Invocation and Ceremony for Solo Saxophone (1981)
- Nocturne and Toccata for Piano and Percussion (1981)
- Passacaglia Cadenzas and Finale for Trumpet, Tuba and Piano (1981)
- Suite for Percussion Quartet (1981)
- Encore and Reggae for Marimba and Tuba (1981)
- Second Suite "Pike's Peak" for Two Trumpets (1981)
- Capriccio for String Quartet (1982)
- Festival Dances for Accordion, Viola, Cello, Double Bass and Percussion (1982)
- Pentagram for 5 Trumpets (1982)
- Canticles for Brass Quintet and Organ (1982)
- 6 Bagatelles "from The Devil's Dictionary" for Woodwind Quintet (1971–1993)
- Piece for Tuba and Piano (1983)
- Fanfare for Queen Elizabeth for 10 Trumpets (1984)
- Jazz Music for Brass Quintet, Piano and Marimba (1984)
- The Emperor of Ice Cream for Clarinet Quartet (revised 1985)
- Soundings for Brass (1985)
- Sonata for Cello and Piano (1986–1987)
- Political Implications for Clarinet Quartet (1987)
- "I saw how strangely the planets gathered..." for Flute/Alto Flute, Oboe, Clarinet, Bass Clarinet, Bassoon and 2 Horns (1989)
- Fantasia Quasi Una Sonata for Violin and Piano (1991)
- Trio for Violin, Cello, and Piano (1991)
- A Book of Mirrors for Two Pianos and Percussion (1992)
- "...and dark time flowed by her like a river..." for Violin or Viola or Cello and Piano (1993)
- Masks for Recorder and Guitar (1994)
- Pro et Contra for Violin and Cello (1995)
- Conceits for Solo Recorder (1995)
- Quintet-Sonata for Marimba and String Quartet (1996)
- Sextet for Flute, Oboe, Vibraphone, Piano, Violin and Cello (1998)
- Trio No.2 for Violin, Piano and Cello (2000–01)
- Variations on a Theme by Benjamin Britten (2003)
- Trio for Horn, Violin and Piano (2004)
- Sonata for Trombone and Piano (2013)
- Sonata for Oboe and Piano (2016)

=== Piano ===
- Sonata (1970)
- 3 Sonatinas (1969–1971)
- Sonata for Two Pianos (1970–1972)
- Monument for Piano 4 hands (1978)
- Aphorisms (1978)
- Second Sonata (1980)
- Third Sonata (1986)
- Mythologies for Two Pianos (1987)
- Two Pieces for Piano (1994)
- Four Fantastic Landscapes (1996)

=== Choral ===
- 2 Songs for Mixed Chorus on Texts by Emily Dickinson

1. Within my garden rides a bird (1973, revised 1979)
2. Most she touched me by her muteness (1979)

- The Drift of Stars for Orchestra and Children's Choir (1988); text by the composer
- Shaman Songs for Mixed Chorus, Clarinet, and String Quartet (1990); text by the composer
- Wild Swans for Mixed Chorus, Harp, Piano, Marimba and Cello (1991); text by W.B. Yeats
- Give Us Peace for Mixed Chorus (2002); text by the composer
- Night Watch for Mixed Chorus and Clarinet (2003); text by Sir Charles G. D. Roberts

=== Vocal ===
- Love Songs for Voice and Piano (1980); text by the composer
- Lifesongs for Alto and String Orchestra (1985); text by the composer
- Night Music for Voice and Piano (1987); texts by Shakespeare, Shelley, and Byron
- Snake for Bass-Baritone and Chamber Ensemble (1988); text by D. H. Lawrence
- 4 Canadian Folk Songs for Voice and Saxophone Quintet (1989)
- Blue Heron on Old Mill Bridge for Soprano and Piano (2000); text by Raymond Souster
