= Tuckamore Festival =

Chamber music festival in Newfoundland, Canada

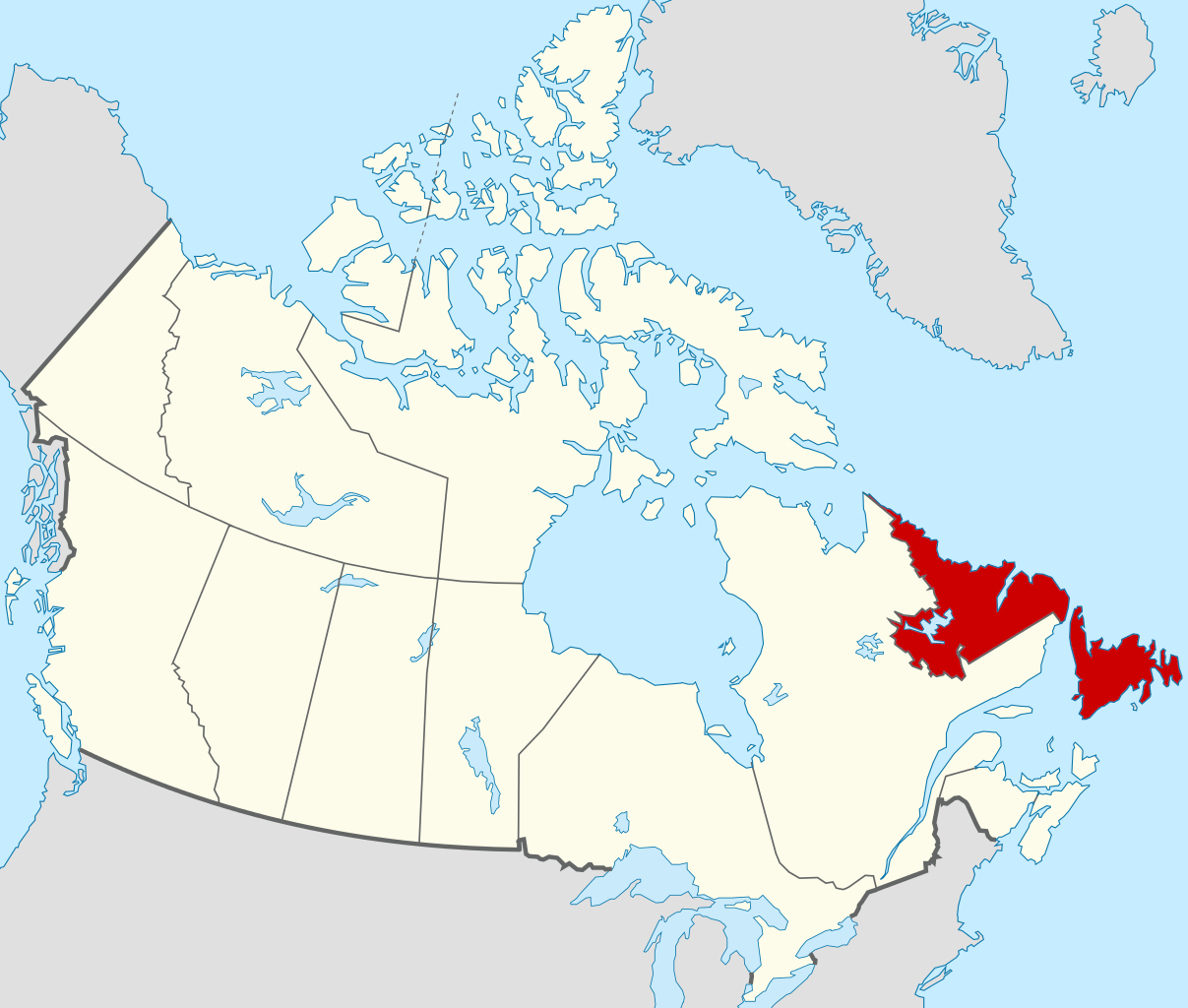
- Newfoundland and Labrador highlighted in red
- Formation: 2001; 25 years ago
- Type: Non-profit organization
- Purpose: Chamber Music
- Location: St. John's, Newfoundland and Labrador
- Coordinates: 47.5738°N 52.7329°W
- Region served: Avalon Peninsula, Newfoundland and Labrador, Canada
- Artistic Directors: Nancy Dahn and Timothy Steeves
- Executive Director: Lynette Stoyles
- Website: tuckamorefestival.ca

The Tuckamore Festival is a chamber music festival in St. John's, Newfoundland, Canada. It is traditionally held annually in August for two weeks. The festival was co-founded in 2001 by violinist Nancy Dahn and pianist Timothy Steeves, classical musicians who perform together as Duo Concertante. Dahn and Steeves are the current artistic directors of the festival. This year's festival will be held online from June 23 to July 26, 2025.

== Programs ==
=== Young Artist Program ===
The Young Artist Program is composed of up to 25 musicians. Violinists, violists, cellists, bassists, or pianists are eligible to apply. Acceptance is based on artistic merit and instrument availability. The Artistic Directors select repertoire and form the chamber ensembles prior to the Festival.

During the course of the festival, the Young Artists participate in individual rehearsal, private lessons, chamber group rehearsal, chamber music coaching, performance opportunities, masterclasses, and body mapping sessions by a licensed Andover Educator.

The festival has mentored more than 350 young musicians and composers through its 20-year history. Young artist alumni have won East Coast Music Awards and Juno Awards, and have performed with the Fitzwilliam String Quartet, Sybarite5, Vancouver and Calgary symphony orchestras, the Dardanelles and Hey Rosetta.

=== Young Composer Program ===
The Young Composer Program is composed of up to three emerging composers. Unlike the Young Artist Program, this program is one week in duration.

During the week, the students' compositions are work shopped, rehearsed, and performed by the Young Artists and faculty. They also participate in masterclasses and score study.

== Faculty ==
In 2020, resident faculty includes:

- Nancy Dahn, Artistic Director, Violinist
- Timothy Steeves, Artistic Director, Pianist
- Vernon Regehr, Faculty, Cellist
- Andrew Staniland, Faculty, Composer

== Guest artists ==
The festival has presented over 150 guest artist performers throughout its 20-year history. Notable guest artist ensembles include the Shanghai Quartet, St. Lawrence String Quartet, Danish Quartet, Fitzwilliam Quartet, Gryphon Trio, Sybarite5, and pianists Marc-André Hamelin, Jon Kimura Parker, André Laplante, Louis Lortie and Janina Fialkowska.

== Venues ==
The primary concert venues are located in the Memorial University of Newfoundland's School of Music. Other venues in St. John's include:

- Rocket Room, Rocket Bakery
- St. Andrew's Presbyterian Church, "The Kirk"
- LPSU Hall
- Gower St. United Church

Other Areas of Newfoundland:

- The Old Church in Admiral's Cove
- St. George's Heritage Church in Brigus
- Fisher's Loft, Port Rexton, Trinity Bay
