= Larry Nickel =

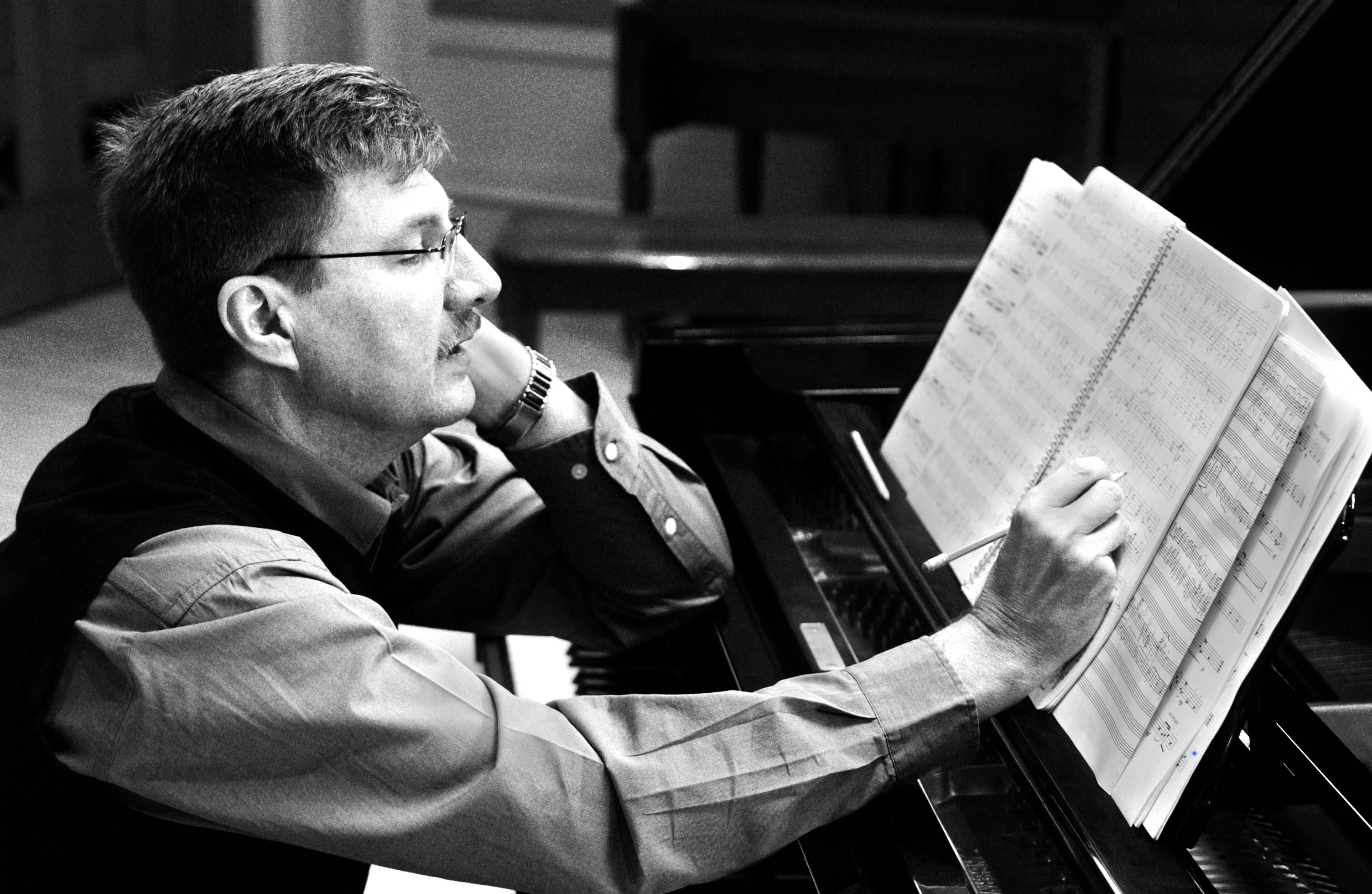
- Larry Nickel composing in 2004

Background information
- Birth name: Lawrence Nickel
- Born: March 12, 1952 (age 73)
- Origin: Vancouver, British Columbia
- Genres: Choral Music
- Occupation(s): Composer, Singer, Conductor, Publisher
- Instrument(s): Singing, Piano
- Website: http://cypresschoral.com/

Larry Nickel (born March 12, 1952) is a Canadian composer, conductor, music publisher and singer who devotes much of his focus to choral music. He is an associate composer of the Canadian Music Centre. He has composed for a wide spectrum of genres; electronic and computer music, string quartet, woodwind and brass quintet, symphony orchestra, symphonic wind ensemble and choral ensembles, including both secular and ecclesiastical music. Primarily, he has written and arranged hundreds of compositions for choirs. Nickel also works as a choral clinician, occasional university professor, music minister, guest conductor and music festival adjudicator. Nickel sang professionally with the Vancouver Chamber Choir for six years, directed the award winning Jubilate Vocal Ensemble for five years, and also sang 2nd bass with the acclaimed Vancouver Cantata Singers for many years. In 2010 Nickel became the owner of Cypress Choral Music Publishing. Nickel's music has been published by 12 companies including Oxford University Press, G. Schirmer, Shawnee Press, Pavane Publishing, Morton Music, Cypress Choral Music, Classica and Canadian International Music. The Canadian Broadcasting Corporation - CBC Radio - has featured his music many times. The "Sounds of Majesty" radio broadcast out of Chicago (syndicated to a myriad of stations around North America) has featured Larry Nickel's music hundreds of times.

== Biography ==
Born to parents who became missionaries when he was eleven years old, Nickel studied music in Kodaikanal India under the International Baccalaureate Program. He was given a chance to direct his high school chamber choir when he was 17. Upon returning to Canada, he formed a coffeehouse band with friends called the "Sound of Light", which performed regularly in the Vancouver area for four years, made two LP recordings, and worked in recording studios as back-up singers for Dolores Claman ("Hockey Night in Canada" composer). He studied at Columbia Bible College, the University of British Columbia, and the University of Lethbridge. His Master of Music degree was completed at the University of Western Washington University in 1983.

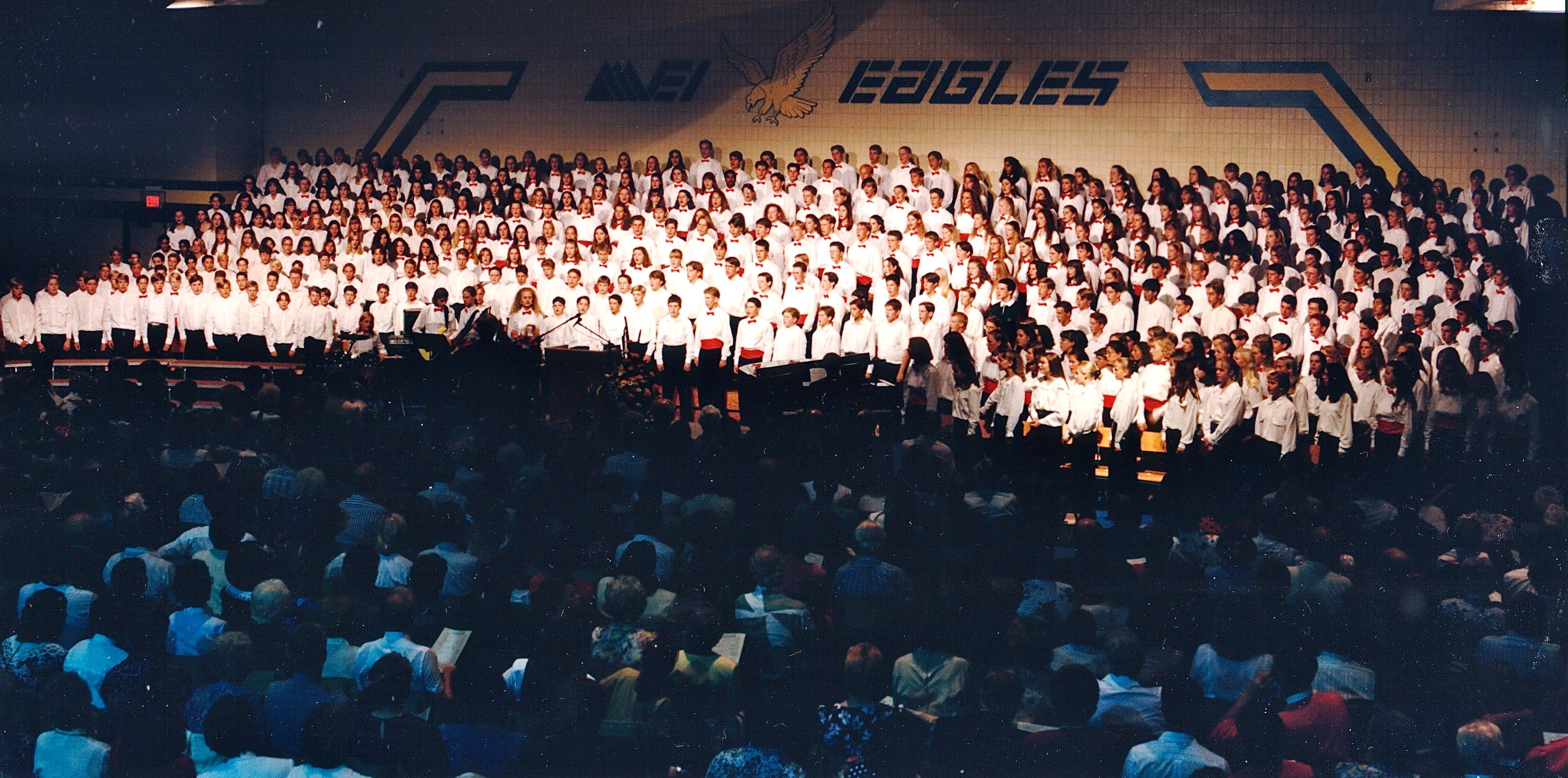
Christmas Choir at M.E.I. - director Larry Nickel

Nickel worked as a high school performing arts teacher for 25 years at the Mennonite Educational Institute. During that time he directed over 50 stage productions including several Gilbert and Sullivan operettas. In 1993 he won the International Association for Jazz Education award for "outstanding service to jazz education". His senior choir was selected two years in a row, 2001 and 2002, by Varsity Vocals' international search for the Best of High School Choirs.

In 1989, Nickel almost died of viral encephalitis. Following a long convalescence, he says, "During that time of healing I committed myself to writing music that speaks to the deep questions of our existence." Christian convictions permeate much of his writing.

Nickel and director Tony Funk founded the West Coast Mennonite Chamber Choir in 1990. Over the following fifteen years the choir recorded thirteen CDs, including over one hundred of Nickel's compositions, with proceeds from CD sales donated to Communitas Supportive Care Services, a charitable organization that works with mentally challenged people.

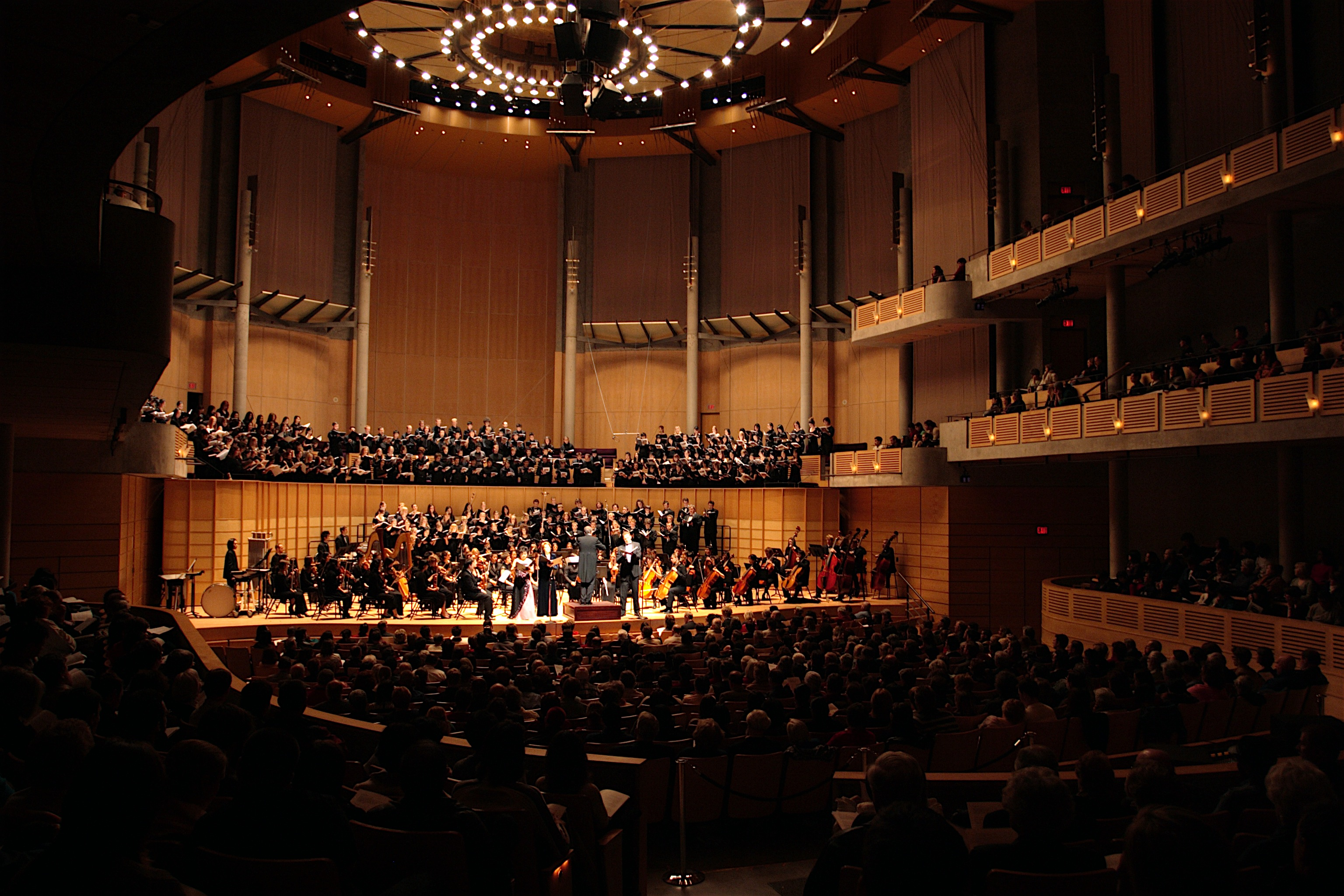
Requiem for Peace premiere

In 2003, Nickel began a Doctorate (DMA) in Composition, which he obtained in 2007. He studied with Stephen Chatman, Dorothy Chang and Keith Hamel. His thesis involved writing a Requiem in thirteen languages. "Requiem for Peace" was premiered at the Chan Centre for the Performing Arts in December 2005 under the direction Bruce Pullan. In 2010 Bruce Pullan presented "Requiem for Peace" at the Orpheum theatre with the VSO and the Vancouver Bach Choir. In 2011 Nickel reset "Requiem for Peace" for chamber size forces and this version was premiered by the Vancouver Chamber Choir that November. Since then, Requiem for Peace has had many performances; Örebro, Västerås, Corfu, Toronto, Halifax, Guelph, Magdeburg, Speinshart, Regensburg, Nördlingen, Bayreuth, Chicago, Goshen, Ottawa (with the National Arts Centre Orchestra), in New York at Carnegie Hall and at the Ukraine Philharmonic in Kyiv in 2020.

Nickel has received well over a hundred commissions from groups such as the Vancouver Cantata Singers, Pro Coro Canada, Vancouver Chamber Choir, Vancouver Bach Choir, Elektra, Chor Leoni, Welsh Men's Choir, Salt Lake Vocal Artists, the Örebro Chamber Choir, Winnipeg Children's Choir, Pacific Mennonite Children's Choir, PODIUM honor choir, Halifax Camerata, Erato Ensemble, Canadian Tenors, Linden Singers, Faith and Life Men's Chorus, etc. His work has also been performed by Pinchas Zukerman, Ben Heppner, the NACO Woodwind Quintet, the Pacific Symphonic Wind Ensemble and the National Youth Orchestra of Canada.

Larry and his wife, Edna, live in Vancouver, close to their three children and seven grandchildren.

== Discography ==
- Songs My Father Taught Me -1991 - The West Coast Mennonite Chamber Choir
- Carols for the Infant King - 1992 - The West Coast Mennonite Chamber Choir featuring Edith Wiens
- Through an Open Window - 1993 - The West Coast Mennonite Chamber Choir
- A Mennonite Tapestry - 1994 - The West Coast Mennonite Chamber Choir
- Songs of Earth, Echoes of Heaven - 1996 - The West Coast Mennonite Chamber Choir featuring Ben Heppner
- Come Heart’s Delight - 1997 - The West Coast Mennonite Chamber Choir
- Canadian Safari - 1997 – Chor Leoni
- Meditation – 1998 - Calvin Dyck (violinist)
- When I Was a Child - 1998 - The West Coast Mennonite Chamber Choir
- Remember Thy Creator - 1998 - Mennonite Educational Institute Choirs
- Rare Benediction - 1999 - The West Coast Mennonite Chamber Choir
- As Evening Shadows Fall - 2000 - The West Coast Mennonite Chamber Choir
- My Heart My Home - 2001 - The West Coast Mennonite Chamber Choir
- The Time of Eternity - 2002 - The West Coast Mennonite Chamber Choir
- Pavane for a True Musical Prince - 2002 - Mennonite Educational Institute Choirs
- Faith and Life Choral Festival 2002 – variety of choirs
- And Night Shall End - 2003 - The West Coast Mennonite Chamber Choir
- By Light Indwelled - 2004 - The West Coast Mennonite Chamber Choir
- One Small Child – 2004 - Calvin Dyck (violinist)
- Canadian Safari Two - 2005 - Chor Leoni
- Requiem for Peace – 2006 - UBC Chorus and Symphony
- Circle of Compassion - 2007 - Chor Leoni
- Sacred Reflections of Canada - 2017 - Canadian Chamber Choir
