= Vincent Ho =

Vincent Ho may refer to:

- Vincent Ho (composer)
- Vincent Ho (politician)
- Vincent C Y Ho, horse racing jockey.
