= Jared Miller (composer) =

Canadian-American Composer

Dr. Jared A. Miller
- Born: October 31, 1988 (age 37); Los Angeles
- Occupations: Composer, professor
- Awards: SOCAN Jan V. Matejcek Award for Excellence in New Classical Composition CBC's "30 Hot Classical Musicians Under 30" list Juno Award nomination

Academic background
- Education: B.M. in Composition; M.Mus. in Composition; DMusA in Composition
- Alma mater: University of British Columbia Juilliard School of Music
- Thesis: (2012)
- Doctoral advisor: Samuel Adler
- Website: jaredmillermusic.wordpress.com/about/

Jared Miller (born October 31, 1988) is a Canadian-American composer of contemporary classical music. Named one of CBC's "30 Hot Canadian Classical Musicians Under 30," his work has been performed by many of the major orchestras in Canada and the United States, and has garnered him a Juno-nomination.

== Biography ==
Jared Miller was born in Los Angeles, California, but soon moved to Vancouver, British Columbia, where he displayed an early interest in piano and composition. He attended the University of British Columbia (BM) and the Juilliard School (MM; DMA), studying composition with John Corigliano, Samuel Adler, Stephen Chatman, and Dorothy Chang, and piano with Sara Davis Buechner and Corey Hamm. Other mentors have included Aaron Jay Kernis and Steven Mackey.

Miller was commissioned by the Vancouver Symphony to write 2010 Traffic Jam for the 2010 Winter Olympic Games, subsequently becoming composer-in-residence with the Victoria Symphony at the age of 25. At this time, he was commuting between the United States and Canada while teaching at Dalhousie University, the Special Music School, Kaufman Music Center, and the Juilliard School's prep division.

Miller made his Carnegie Hall debut in 2011, when pianist Ang Li commissioned his Souvenirs d’Europe, which are inspired by travels throughout Europe. His Fuse was premiered by Latitude 49 and the Attacca Quartet. In 2014, his piece Contrasted Perspectives was featured in the New York Philharmonic's Biennial.

In 2018, Miller composed his first piano concerto, Shattered Night, which was commissioned by Sara Davis Buechner and the Winnipeg Symphony for the 80th Anniversary of Kristallnacht. Conductor Timothy Muffitt described the work as, "among the most heartfelt, poignant and moving works written in this century that I have encountered."

His composition Under Sea, Above Sky was premiered by the New Jersey Symphony under Ludovic Morlot, and was commissioned for the National Youth Orchestra of Canada's 2019 tour of Spain. The piece imitates whale song to convey a message of climate change awareness. In addition to a nomination for the Juno Award for Classical Composition of the Year, the Chicago Symphony later added the composition to their repertoire.

That same year, the Detroit Symphony and Leonard Slatkin commissioned Luster, which was premiered under Robert Spano. In 2023, he was featured in Grammy Award-nominated pianist Han Chen's "Infinite Staircase" project at National Sawdust, composing Prelude to pair with György Ligeti's third étude.

Miller has also worked with additional conductors Peter Oundjian, Giancarlo Guerrero, Alexander Prior, Xian Zhang, Harold Rosenbaum, Robert Franz, Tania Miller, Jeffrey Milarsky, Jaelem Bhate, Adam Johnson, Stilian Kirov, Otto Tausk, Daniel Bartholomew-Poyser, and George Manahan. His works have been described as "playful" by The New York Times, "timely" by the Chicago Tribune, "highly personal" by CBC Radio, and he was described as a "rising star" by MusicWorks Magazine.

Miller is currently the composer-in-residence at the Lansing Symphony Orchestra and is on the faculty at the University of North Carolina School of the Arts. Past students have included pianist Kevin Chen. He has represented Canada at the ISCM World Music Days 3 times, for which he composed a violin concerto.

== List of Works ==
=== Concerti ===
- Shattered Night for piano and orchestra (2019)
- Concerto Corto for violin and orchestra (2017)
- Neró, concerto for small orchestra (2017)

=== Orchestra ===
- House of Dreams (2026)
- Teaser - Feature - Pleaser (2025)
- Under Sea, Above Sky (2019)
- Ricochet – Reverb – Repeat (2018)
- Luster (2017)
- Surge and Swell (2017)
- Buzzer Beater (2017)
- Palimpsest (2016)
- Lament of the Wind (2016)
- Soundscape for a Century Past (2015)
- Echoes of Autumn for string orchestra (2015)
- Contrasted Perspectives: Two Surrealist Portraits (2013)
- Fellini (2013)
- Flickering Images (2011)
- 2010 Traffic Jam (2009)

=== Chamber Works ===
- Follow for string octet (2025)
- Dream Echoes for harp and sextet (2024)
- The Bright Exuberant Silence for 10 players (2023)
- Phoenix for string quartet (2021)
- Go! for mixed quartet (2021)
- Absolute for piano trio (2020)
- Leviathan for sextet and electronics (2018)
- Strangled by Growth for string quartet (2016)
- Fuse for mixed sextet and string quartet (2016)
- Guilty Pleasures for mixed sextet (2015)
- Lennie for flute and piano (2015)
- Bloom for mixed flute ensemble, solo cello, and optional percussion (2014)
- Hap-π-ness for woodwind trio (2014)
- Brushstrokes for piano and ensemble (2014)
- Captive for piano and erhu (2013)
- The Duality of Nostalgia for mixed sextet (2013)
- Full Circle (2013)
- Within the Walls for string quartet (2012)
- Roi for woodwind quintet and 6 dancers (2011)
- Caprice for violin and piano (2011)
- Within the Walls I for string quartet (2012)

=== Solo ===
- Erode? Evolve? for piano solo (2022)
- Prelude for piano solo (2022)
- Triptych for piano solo (2016)
- Retour aux sources: Grand Pré for piano solo (2013)
- Cantus Firmus for piano solo (2012)
- Souvenirs d'Europe for piano solo (2011)
- L'escalier de la feuille d'erable for piano solo (2010)
- Instincts for piano solo (2009)
- Two Preludes for solo piano (2008)
- Ballade for solo piano (2007)
- Butterflies for solo piano (2006)

=== Choral Music ===
- In Flanders Fields (2016)
- Shalom Rav (2011)

=== Electronic ===
- In a State of Flux (2013)
