= Keiko Devaux =

- Born: 1982 (age 43–44); Castlegar, British Columbia
- Education: Université de Montréal
- Known for: Musical composition
- Awards: Azrieli Commission for Canadian Music
- Website: https://keikodevaux.com/

Keiko Devaux (born 1982) is a Canadian composer of contemporary classical music. She is most noted for her 2021 composition "Arras", which won the Juno Award for Classical Composition of the Year at the Juno Awards of 2022.

She was born in Castlegar, British Columbia to a Japanese-Canadian mother and French father in 1982, and raised in the town of Nelson. In the 2000s, Devaux was active in the Canadian indie rock scene composing, touring, and recording albums in groups such as The Acorn, which she joined in 2006 on keyboards and marimba, and Adam and the Amethysts.

In 2017 she earned a Master of Music in instrumental composition from the Université de Montréal with a thesis on the topic of "Musical 'translations' of experience through the interpretation of extra-musical forms and patterns". In 2019 she was the recipient of the inaugural Azrieli Commission for Canadian Music, the largest prize for new music composition in Canada.

In 2020 she was awarded a two-year residency at the National Arts Centre Orchestra as a Carrefour composer. In 2022, she won Quebec's prize for composer of the year from the Conseil des arts et des lettres du Québec and the Opus Awards. She is also pursuing doctoral studies in music composition and sound creation at the Université de Montréal, under the direction of Ana Sokolović and Pierre Michaud.

== Works ==
- Tenebræ (2018) for string quartet. 7m. Commissioned by Musica Assoluta. Premiered by members of the Musica Assoluta Ensemble in Hannover, Germany.
- Salt (2018) for string quartet. 9m. Premiered by Quartetto Prometeo at the Chigiana Academy in Siena, Italy.
- Ebb (2018) for 15 musicians [fl, hb, cl, b.cl, bsn, hn, tp, tbn, pno, perc, 2vln, vla, vlc, db]. 15m. Commissioned and premiered by Le Nouvel Ensemble Moderne at Bain Mathieu, Montréal.
- kintsukuroi (2018), for piano, percussion, and alto saxophone. 10m. Commissioned by Code d’accès. Premiered by Kimihiro Yasaka, David Therrien-Brongo, and Louis-Philippe Bonin at Le Gesù, Montréal.
- Ombra (2018) concerto for 5-string baroque cello and string orchestra. 13m. Commissioned and premiered by Ensemble Arkea and soloist Elinor Frey), under the direction of Dina Gilbert at la Chapelle Historique du Bon-Pasteur, Montréal.
- À perte de vue... (2018) for symphony orchestra. 9m. Premiered by l’Orchestre de l'Université de Montréal under the direction of Walter Boudreau at La Maison Symphonique, Montréal QC.
- Dust (2019) for string quartet. 11m. Premiered by Quartetto Prometeo at the Chigiana Academy in Siena, Italy.
- Arras (2020) for 14 musicians [fl (picc.), ob, cl (bcl), bn, hn, tpt, tbn, perc, pno, 2vn, va, vc, cb]. 24m. Premiered by Le Nouvel Ensemble Moderne at Salle Bourgie, Montréal.
