= Robert Turner (composer) =

Canadian composer, radio producer and music educator

- Born: June 6, 1920; Montreal, Quebec
- Died: January 26, 2012 (aged 91) Winnipeg, Manitoba
- Occupations: Composer, educator, radio producer

Robert Comrie Turner, CM (June 6, 1920 – January 26, 2012) was a Canadian composer, educator, and radio producer.

== Biography ==
Born in Montreal, Turner graduated in 1943 with a bachelor's degree in music from McGill University, following studies with Douglas Clarke and Claude Champagne. While enrolled briefly at Colorado College in 1947, he met the percussionist, Sara Scott, whom he married in 1949. In 1947, Turner transferred to Peabody College in Nashville, Tennessee, where he studied with Roy Harris. He graduated in 1950 with a master's degree. During this period, Turner spent summers studying with Herbert Howells and Gordon Jacob at the Royal College of Music, then at the Berkshire Music Center at Tanglewood with Olivier Messiaen. Returning to McGill in 1951, he graduated with a doctorate in 1953.

From 1952-68, Turner worked as a CBC Radio producer in Vancouver, where he championed the music of Canadian composers and oversaw broadcasts of the CBC Vancouver Chamber Orchestra. He taught at the University of British Columbia (1955-57), Acadia University (1968-69), and at the University of Manitoba from 1969 until his retirement in 1985. His students included Peter Allen, Pat Carrabré, Jim Hiscott, Diana McIntosh, and Glenn Buhr.

Turner's music has been described as reflecting a variety of influences including jazz, folk music and dance. The composer himself described his music as lyrical and tonal; it also has been noted that Turner could integrate "contemporary techniques with a strong command of mood and evocation, especially of place." He wrote more than 70 works including two operas: The Brideship (1967) and Vile Shadows (1983).

Turner was appointed a member of the Order of Canada in 2002.

The Turner portrait in the Canadian Composers Portraits series was released in 2004.

He received the Western Canadian Music Alliance's Heritage Award in 2009.

Robert Turner died in Winnipeg on January 26, 2012.

== Selected works ==
Stage

- The Brideship, Opera in 1 act, 3 scenes (1966–67); libretto by George Woodcock
- Vile Shadows, Opera in 2 acts for soloists and wind quintet (1982–83, revised 1998); libretto after the play by Norman Newton

Orchestra

- Opening Night, Theatre Overture (1955)
- Lyric Interlude (1956)
- Nocturne (1956, 1965); original version for piano
- A Children's Overture (1958); suitable for youth and community orchestras
- The Pemberton Valley, Suite (1958)
- Symphony for Strings, string orchestra (1960)
- 3 Episodes (1963)
- Moerae (1963)
- Eidolons, 12 Images, chamber orchestra (1972)
- Variations on "The Prairie Settlers's Song" (1974)
- Symphony in One Movement "Gift from the Sea", Symphony No. 2 (1983)
- Playhouse Music (1986)
- Shades of Autumn (1987)
- Manitoba Memoir, string orchestra (1989)
- Symphony No. 3 (1990)
- House of Shadows, A Symphonic Synthesis after the Opera Vile Shadows (1994)
- Diverti-memento, chamber orchestra (1997)
- Festival Dance (1997)

Band

- Robbins' Round, Concertino, jazz band (1959)

Concertante

- Concerto, 2 pianos, orchestra (1971)
- Chamber Concerto, bassoon, 17 instruments (1973)
- Capriccio Concertante, cello, piano, orchestra (1975)
- From a Different Country: Homage to Gabrieli, solo brass quintet, orchestra (1976)
- Encounters, soloists, orchestra (1985)

1. Flutenanny, Encounter I, flute, string orchestra, harp
2. Spring Greeting, Encounter II, clarinet, string orchestra, piano
3. Shadows, Like Lost Souls, Encounter III, violin, orchestra
4. A Great Quiet and a Still Home, Encounter IV for cello and orchestra
5. Ebb Tide, Encounter V, voice (high or low), orchestra; words by Marjorie Pickthall
6. The Wind's and the Wave's Riot, Encounter VI, piano, orchestra
7. Shepherd on the Make, Encounter VII, oboe, string orchestra, percussion
8. The Old Sea's Pride, Encounter VIII, horn, orchestra
9. The Strong Thunder of the Full Straits, Encounter IX, trombone, orchestra

- Concerto, viola, orchestra (1986–87)
- A Group of Seven: Poems of Love and Nature by Canadian Poets, viola, narrator, orchestra (1991)

Chamber music

- String Quartet No. 1 (1949)
- Lament, flute, oboe, clarinet, bassoon, piano (1951)
- String Quartet No. 2 (1954)
- Sonata, violin, piano (1956)
- Little Suite for harp (1957)
- Vignette, clarinet, 2 violins, viola, cello (1958, revised 1988)
- Variations and Toccata, flute (piccolo), oboe, clarinet, bassoon, horn, 2 violins, viola, cello, double bass (1959)
- Serenade for flute, oboe, clarinet, horn, bassoon (1960)
- 4 Fragments, 2 trumpets, horn, 2 trombones (1961)
- Fantasia, organ, brass quintet, timpani (1962)
- Diversities, violin, bassoon, piano (1967)
- Transition, Trio: violin, cello, piano (1969)
- Fantasy and Festivity, harp (1970)
- Nostalgia, soprano saxophone, piano (1972)
- String Quartet No. 3 (1975)
- Lament for Linos, An Elegiac Triptych flute (piccolo), clarinet (E-flat clarinet), piano (celesta), prepared tape, slides (1978); words by Rainer Maria Rilke
- Shadow Pieces, flute, bassoon, violin, cello, piano (1981)
- Bitonal Wedding, 3 Fanfares, 2 trumpets (1997)

Keyboard

- Sonata Lyrica, piano (1955, revised 1963)
- Nocturne, piano (1956); orchestrated in 1965
- Dance of the Disenchanted, piano (1959, 1988)
- 6 Voluntaries, organ (1959)
- A Merry-Mournful (Major-Minor) Mood, piano (1971)
- Wedding March, organ or piano (1977)
- Vestiges, 3 Pieces, piano (1987)

Vocal

- Eclogue: The Nymph's Reply to the Shepherd, voice, oboe (or flute, or clarinet, or violin), harpsichord (or piano) (1958); words by Sir Walter Raleigh
- 4 Songs, tenor, orchestra (1959)
- The Phoenix and the Turtle, mezzo-soprano, flute, bass clarinet, clarinet, string trio, celesta, harp (1964); words by William Shakespeare
- Suite in Homage to Melville, soprano, alto, viola, piano (1966); words by Herman Melville
- Four Songs, voice, orchestra (1969); words from Friday's Child by Wilfred Watson
- Johann's Gift to Christmas, narrator, orchestra (1972)
- Ebb Tide, Encounter V, voice (high or low), orchestra (1985); words by Marjorie Pickthall
- Time for Three, 3 Songs, mezzo-soprano, viola, piano (1985); words by John Milton, Marjorie Pickthall and anonymous
- Four "Last Songs," voice, violin, piano (1995); words by Francis Ledwidge

Choral

- 2 Choral Pieces, mixed chorus (1952); words by Wallace Stevens and E. E. Cummings
- Mobile for mixed, chorus, percussion (1960); words by Elder Olson
- Prophetic Song, female chorus a cappella (1961); words by Percy Bysshe Shelley
- The Third Day, Cantata, 2 sopranos, contralto, tenor, baritone, mixed chorus, orchestra (1962)
- The House of Christmas, 4 Carols, mixed chorus (1963); words by G. K. Chesterton
- 5 Canadian Folk Songs from the Maritimes and Newfoundland, soprano, mixed chorus (1973)
- 10 Canadian Folk Songs, voice, piano (1973) or voice, orchestra (1980)
- Amoroso Canto, mixed chorus a cappella (1978); words by Wallace Stevens, Paul Verlaine, Louis Dudek, Guillaume Apollinaire and Thomas Hardy
- River of Time, mixed chorus, orchestra (1994); words by Matthew Arnold

Television scores

- Object Matrimony, Television play (1958)
- The Pemberton Valley, Documentary (1958)
- Yosef Drenters, Documentary (1961)
