= Ang Li (pianist) =

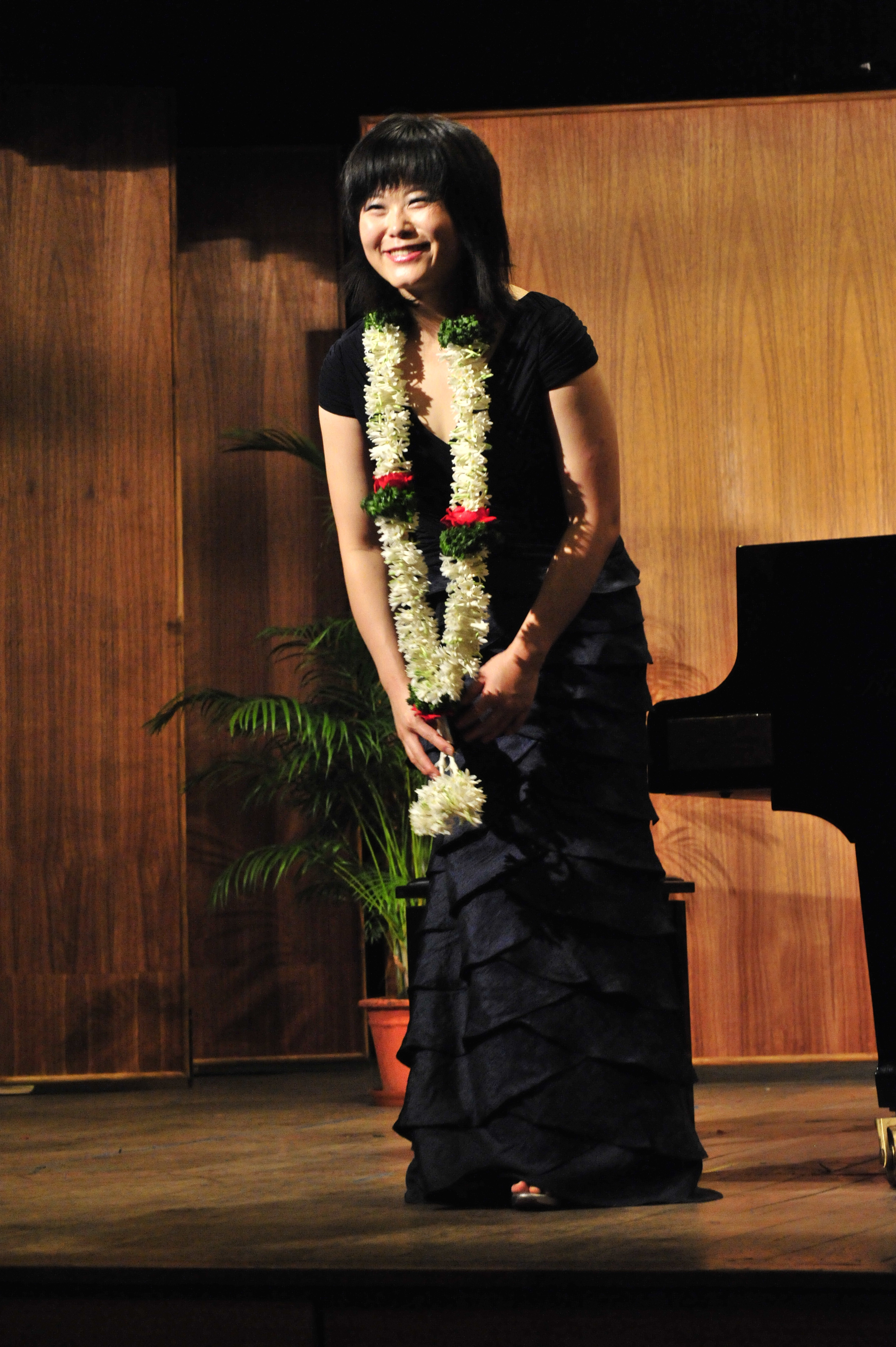
Ang Li at The Mazda Hall, after giving the India premiere of Alexina Louie's Memories in an Ancient Garden. Photo Credit: Arnaud Devic

Ang Li (李昂; Li Ang) (born 1985 in Beijing, China) is a classical pianist.

== Early years ==
Ang Li began playing the piano by ear at age one. Ang Li made her first public appearance at Beijing Concert Hall at age six. At age thirteen, she made her orchestral debut with the Little Orchestra Society of New York at Avery Fisher Hall. She has also performed with the Montréal Symphony Orchestra, Fort Worth Symphony Orchestra, Staten Island Symphony, The Lanaudière Music Festival Orchestra, City Chamber Orchestra of Hong Kong, American Academy of Conducting Orchestra, and one month prior to performing at Avery Fisher Hall, Ms. Li made her orchestral debut with the Manhattan School of Music Repertory Orchestra.

== Selected awards ==
Li is a citizen of Canada and the United States of America. She gained national renown after winning the OSM Standard Life Competition, in which she was awarded the First Prize in the B category, Best Interpretation of a Canadian Work Prize, Orchestre symphonique de Montréal Prize, Radio-Canada Prize, Galaxie Rising Stars Award, and the Jeunesses Musicales of Canada Award. Ang Li is a Steinway Artist.

== Selected performances ==
Ang Li has performed on five continents: North and South America, Europe, Australia and Asia. She has appeared at Carnegie Hall, John F. Kennedy Center for the Performing Arts, Alice Tully Hall at Lincoln Center for the Performing Arts, National Arts Centre in Ottawa, Ruïnekerk of Bergen in the Netherlands, Hong Kong City Hall, Forbidden City Concert Hall in Beijing, among others. Ms. Li performed with the China National Symphony Orchestra at The China National Center for the Performing Arts in 2007 and the Beijing Symphony Orchestra at the same venue in 2008.

Li commissioned and premiered the Canadian-American composer, Jared Miller's newest piano work, "Souvenirs d'Europe." Recently, the piece won the coveted ASCAP Morton Gould Young Composers Award. In this competition, Miller's score and Li's recording were selected out of nearly 700 submissions from across the United States. Ang Li also gave the US premiere of Jerome Blais' work: "Es ist genug!", as well as the India, Hong Kong, mainland China and Scotland premiere of Alexina Louie's Memories in an Ancient Garden.

== Education ==
Li holds a bachelor's degree from The Curtis Institute of Music, a master's degree from The Juilliard School, and an Artist Diploma from Texas Christian University.

== Broadcast recitals and recordings ==
Li's numerous live recital broadcasts by The Canadian Broadcasting Corporation since 2003 include the opening recital for the 2006 NAC/CBC Aber Diamond Debut Series in Ottawa. Li was also featured on WQXR-FM in a simulcast performance at the Instituto Cervantes New York hosted by David Dubal. Li's recital debut in China as part of the 2007 "Meet in Beijing Arts Festival" was televised nationally by China Central Television. Li has also been featured on WBJC, KBIA, American Public Media, CKWR-FM's Women in Music, and CFMZ-FM where she was voted one of the highlights from the best Classical 96.3 "Concert Lobby" performances of 2010. Recordings of her live competition performances at the Twelfth and Thirteenth Van Cliburn International Piano Competition feature works by Brahms, Bowen, Debussy, Granados, Haydn and Liszt. She has also recorded CDs for the China Record Corporation and Contemporary Record Society.

== Publications ==
Li has been featured in publications such as the Piano Artistry, Fort Worth Weekly, Huffington Post, Sequenza21, The Montreal Gazette, Fort Worth Star-Telegram, The Juilliard Journal, The Staten Island Advance, The Saugeen Times, The Hindu, The Indian Express, InDaily Australia, Deccan Herald, La Presse, The New Indian Express, The Hamilton Spectator, among others.
