= Bekah Simms =

Canadian composer

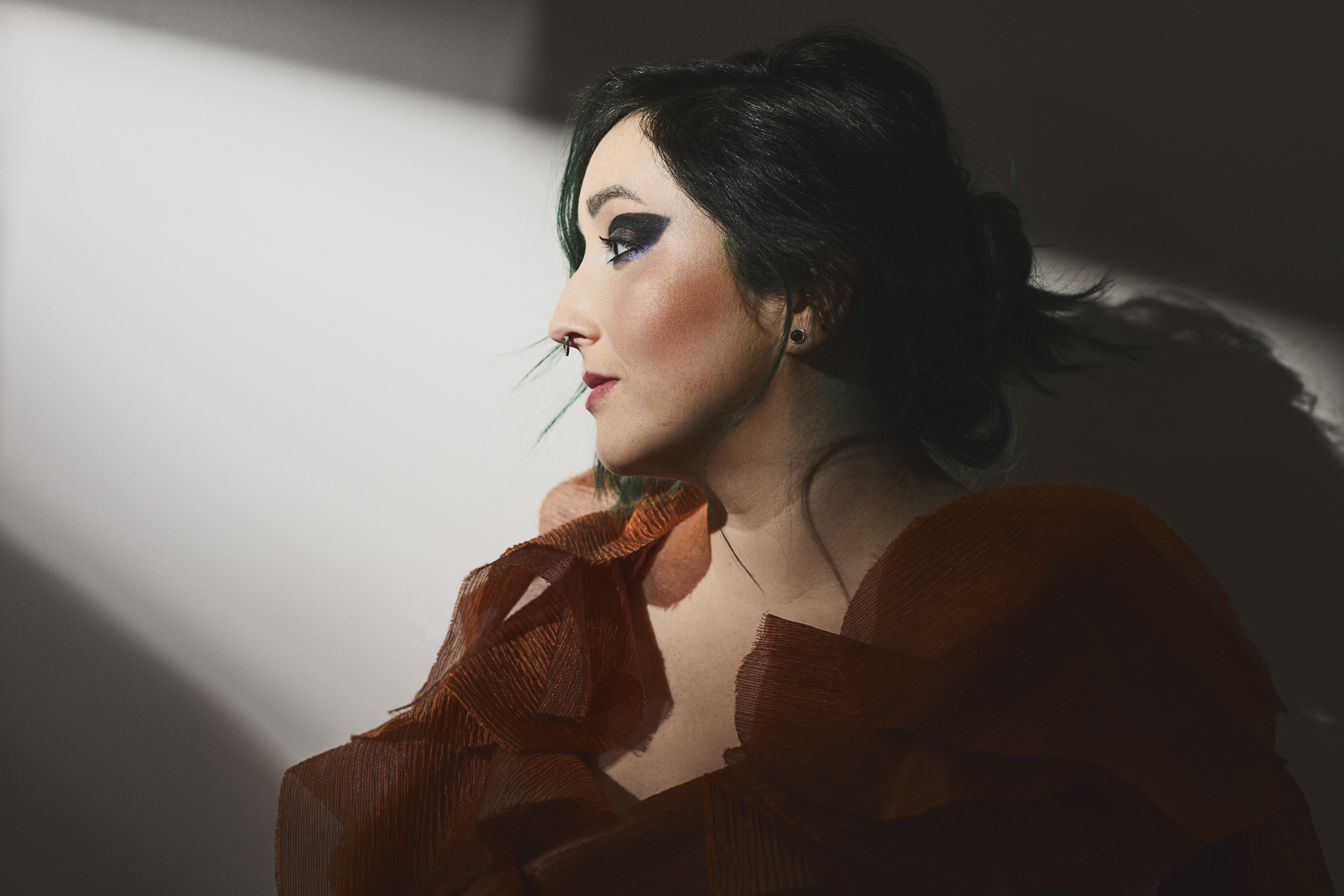
- Simms in 2022
- Born: 1990 (age 35–36); Mount Pearl, Canada
- Education: Memorial University of Newfoundland (BMus); University of Toronto (MMus, DMA)

Bekah Simms (born May 17, 1990) is a Canadian composer of contemporary classical music.

== Education ==
Simms was born and raised in Mount Pearl, Newfoundland and Labrador, where she studied at the nearby Memorial University of Newfoundland with composer Andrew Staniland. At Memorial University, she received a Bachelor of Music in music theory and composition in addition to a Bachelor of Music Education. She also holds Master of Music and Doctor of Musical Arts degrees from the University of Toronto where her teachers included Gary Kulesha, Christos Hatzis, and Norbert Palej. Her thesis work, Foreverdark, was subsequently performed by Esprit Orchestra. Additional studies with acousmatic composer Martin Bédard in Montreal were facilitated through the PIVOT mentorship program, jointly run by the Canadian Music Centre, Canadian League of Composers, and Continuum Contemporary Music.

== Career ==
Simms has received over 30 composition awards, prizes, and competitive selections. This includes the 2019 Barlow Prize, the 2017 Toronto Emerging Composer Award, the 2018 Karen Kieser Prize in Canadian Music, and the inclusion of her work in the official Canadian Section of the International Society for Contemporary Music's World Music Days in 2016, 2019, and 2021. She was a nominee for the 2022 Gaudeamus Award.

Simms released her debut album, impurity chains, in September 2018 to positive reviews. The composition Granitic was subsequently nominated for a 2019 Juno Award for Classical Composition of the Year, and her composition Everything Is... Distorted was nominated for a 2020 Juno Award for Classical Composition of the year. Her second full-length album, Bestiaries (2022), received critical acclaim including inclusion on several year-end best-of lists. In 2023, she received her third Juno nomination in the same category for "Bestiary I & II," which she won.
