= Andrew Staniland =

Canadian composer and guitarist

- Born: 1977 (age 48–49); Red Deer, Alberta, Canada
- Occupations: Composer, professor
- Website: andrewstaniland.com

Andrew Staniland (born 1977) is a Canadian composer and guitarist. He is currently a professor of Composition and Electronic Music at the Memorial University of Newfoundland.

== Biography ==
Andrew Staniland was born in Red Deer, Alberta, in 1977. His first instrument was the guitar, and he began playing in heavy-metal bands as a young teen. Staniland began formal studies in jazz and arranging at Grant MacEwan Community College in Edmonton (now MacEwan University), where he also studied composition with Gordon Nicholson. He then studied classical guitar at the University of Lethbridge, Alberta, before obtaining both a Master's and Doctorate degree in Composition from the University of Toronto.

A composer whose work has been performed and broadcast in over 35 countries, Staniland has been commissioned by musicians and ensembles such as cellist Frances-Marie Uitti, Duo Concertante (violinist Nancy Dahn and pianist Timothy Steeves), the Gryphon Trio, and Les Percussions de Strasbourg. He has also been an Affiliate Composer with both the National Arts Centre Orchestra (2002–2004) and the Toronto Symphony Orchestra (2006–2009), and in 2005 was a composer-in-residence at the Centre de Création Musicale Iannis Xenakis in Paris.

In 2010 Staniland joined the faculty of the School of Music at Memorial University of Newfoundland, where he teaches composition and electronic music. There Staniland founded the Memorial ElectroAcoustic Research Lab (MEARL), where he is part of a cross-disciplinary research team that has created the Mune, an electronic music performance instrument that "combines the functionality of a MIDI controller ... with the expressiveness and simplicity of an acoustic instrument."

Staniland is an Associate Composer of the Canadian Music Centre, a member of the Canadian League of Composers, and an inaugural member of the College of New Scholars, Artists and Scientists of the Royal Society of Canada.

== Honours and awards ==
Staniland has been the recipient of many prestigious awards, including a 2018 ECMA Award for Classical Composition of the Year (for The River is Within Us), the 2016 Terra Nova Young Innovator Award, the National Grand Prize of EVOLUTION (presented in 2009 by CBC Radio 2/Espace Musique and The Banff Centre), and the 2004 Karen Keiser Prize in Canadian Music. He has also received three Juno nominations.

== Education ==
- B.Mus., University of Lethbridge
- M.Mus., University of Toronto
- D.M.A., University of Toronto

== Compositions ==
=== Chamber music ===
- Exit Eden (2017) for flute and harp
- Hypernova (2017) for five flutes
- Equations Constellations (2015) for guitar and harp
- The Ocean is Full of its Own Collapse (2015) for narrator, piano and violin (based on Lisa Moore's novel February)
- Choro: “The Joyful Lament for Villa Lobos” (2014) for 2 guitars
- Four Elements (2014) for string quartet
- Orion Constellation Theory (2014) Version 2, arranged for two snare drums
- Time Travels Light (2014) for percussion quartet
- The Beauty of Reason (2013) for cello and harp
- Flute Vs Flute (2012) for two flutes (acoustic version)
- Flute Vs Flute (2012) arranged for flute and cello
- The River is Within Us (2011) for violin and piano
- Solstice Songs (2011) for piano trio (violin, cello and piano)
- Air (2010) for accordion and percussion
- HeX (2010) for percussion sextet
- Pentagrams (2010) for two accordions
- Pentagrams (2010) arranged for accordion and piano
- Devolution (2009) for chamber ensemble
- Full Circle (2005) for guitar
- After the Crash (2004) for percussionist
- Alchemy (2003) for piano and five solo strings
- Trio (2002) for harp, piano and percussion
- 13 Images (2001) for soprano and clarinet
- Two Pervasive Miniatures (2000) for small chamber ensemble

=== Chamber music with electronics ===
- Cassini (2018) for marimba and electronic delay
- Orion Constellation Theory (2015) Version 1, for snare drum and electronics
- Dreaded Sea Voyage (2013) for classical guitar and electronics
- Flute Vs Tape (2012) for flute and tape
- Still Turning (2011) for cello and electronics
- Talking Down the Tiger (2010) for percussion and live looping
- Sudoku (2009) for violin, tabla and electronics
- Yupana (2009) for chamber ensemble and electronics
- LinguaElastic (2007) for live electronics and spoken word (also an audio installation)
- True North (2007) for saxophone and electronics
- Adventuremusic: Love her Madly (2006) for two pianos, percussion and electronics
- Despite Bright Ideas (2006) for tape
- St Croix (2005) for large chamber ensemble and live electronics
- Tampobata (2005) for singing pianist and electronics
- Tapestry (2003) for clarinet, cello and tape
- For violin #3 (2001) for violin and tape

=== Opera, vocal ===
- Earthquakes and Islands (2016) 8 songs for voice and piano
- Aliment Roots (2015) for soprano and cello
- Lacrimosa (2015) for soprano and cello
- Dear John (2013) for soprano and harp
- Execution Songs (2013) for soprano and piano (also arranged for tenor, baritone, and bass)
- No Labour Saving Machine (2012) for tenor and cello
- Beautymark Aria (from Dark Star Requiem) (2010) for soprano and piano
- Calamus 6 (2010) for soprano and cello
- Dark Star Requiem (2010) operatic oratorio for chamber choir, four soloists (SABB), piano trio and two percussion (Libretto by Jill Battson)
- At the Laurentian Room (2008) for soprano and piano
- Blue (2008) for mezzo-soprano and piano resonance
- Made in China (2008) for tenor, percussion and piano
- Peter Quince at the Clavier (2008) for baritone and piano
- Road to Berlin (2008) for bass and piano
- See Saw (2007) chamber opera (Libretto by Anna Chatterton)
- Ashlike on the Cradle of the Wind (2005) chamber opera (Libretto by Jill Battson)

=== Orchestra ===
- Sounds from the Edge (2017)
- PHI (2016) with electronics
- Reflections on O Canada after Truth and Reconciliation (2016)
- Vast Machine (2014)
- Four Angels (2013) with electronics
- (RE)VOLUTION (2011) Concerto for electric guitar and orchestra
- Only Darkness (2010) for orchestra and mezzo soprano
- Big Bang! (2008) for percussion and orchestra
- Gaia (2007)
- Voyageur (2007)
- Orchestralympics (2005)
- Protestmusik (2004)
- Two Movements for Orchestra (2002)
- Variations on a Theme by D.H Lawrence (2001) for piano and string orchestra

=== Symphonic band ===
- Four Horsemen (2012) for symphonic band and electronics

== Selected discography ==
Year	Title	Composers	Performers	Record label
2018	Go by Contraries	Andrew Staniland	Tyler Duncan, baritone; Martha Guth, soprano; Erika Switzer, piano	Centrediscs CMCCD25918
2017	Encount3rs	Kevin Lau, Nicole Lizée, Andrew Staniland	National Arts Centre Orchestra; Alexander Shelley, conductor	Analekta AN28871-2
2017	Incarnation	Chan Ka Nin, Denis Gougeon, Alice Ho, Jocelyn Morlock, Andrew Staniland	Duo Concertante	Marquis MAR479
2016	Dark Star Requiem	Andrew Staniland	Elmer Iseler Singers, Gryphon Trio, et al	Centrediscs CMCCD22716
2015	Elements Eternal	Brian Current, Michael Oesterle, Andrew Staniland, James K. Wright	Gryphon Trio; Julie Nesrallah, mezzo-soprano	NAXOS 8.573533
2015	Talking Down the Tiger	Andrew Staniland	Wallace Halladay, saxophone; Rob MacDonald, guitar; Ryan Scott, percussion; Frances-Marie Uitti, cello; Camille Watts, flute	NAXOS 8.573428
