= Abigail Richardson-Schulte =

Canadian composer

Abigail Richardson-Schulte (born 1976) is an English-born Canadian composer.

She was born Abigail Richardson in Oxford. Although she was diagnosed as incurably deaf at the age of five, she had fully recovered her hearing a few months after moving to Canada in 1982. From 1994 to 1998, she studied composition with Allan Gordon Bell at the University of Calgary, receiving a BMus. From 1998 to 2004, she studied with Gary Kulesha and Chan Ka Nin at the University of Toronto, receiving a MMus and DMus in composition.

She was an associate composer for the Toronto Symphony Orchestra from 2006 to 2009.

She is married to violinist Michael Schulte. The couple have been artistic directors for Chamber Music Hamilton since 2009.

She has composed music for Roch Carrier's The Hockey Sweater which was performed by major orchestras across Canada in 2013-14.

Richardson-Schulte received the Karen Kieser Prize in Canadian Music in 2003. In 2005, she received first prize in the Canadian Music Centre Prairie Region's competition for emerging composers. In 2004, she was ranked first in the International Rostrum of Composers in the under 30 category. She was composer in residence for the Southern Ontario Chamber Music Institute in 2005 and has been composer in residence for the Hamilton Philharmonic Orchestra since 2012.
