= The Black Fish (album) =

2022 studio album by Keyan Emami

Studio album by Keyan Emami
- Released: October 7, 2022
- Genre: Contemporary Classical
- Length: 35:30
- Label: CMCCD 30422

The Black Fish is the debut solo album by contemporary composer Keyan Emami, released on October 7, 2022, on CMCCD 30422, an imprint of CMC Centrediscs/Naxos.

== Awards and nominations ==
The album was nominated for a JUNO Award in the category of Classical Composition of the Year (2023).

== Critical reception ==
The WholeNote Magazine gave the album a positive review, stating, "In his three-movement inspirational work, Keyan Emami has crafted a multi-stylistic masterpiece that showcases his masterful ability to seamlessly blend elements from the symphonic, jazz, rock, world, and contemporary music genres."

== Performance history ==
The Black Fish premiered at the Aga Khan Museum in Toronto, Canada, on May 27, 2022, featuring a performance by the Black Fish Ensemble. The Black Fish was also performed on July 11, 2022, at the Meridian Arts Centre as part of the Tammuz Summer Tirgan Festival, and again on August 9, 2022, at Palais Royale as part of the Toronto Concert Orchestra Summer Concerts.

== Track listing ==
No.	Title	Length
1.	"Dailiness"	8:18
2.	"Dreaming"	7:49
3.	"Swimming in D"	19:19
Total length:		35:30

All tracks are written by Keyan Emami.

== Personnel ==
Musicians

- Keyan Emami – electronics, narrator
- Andrew Downing – bass
- Majd Sekkar – clarinet
- Louis Pino – percussion
- Naoko Tsujita – percussion
- Ton Beau String Quartet:
  - Bijan Sepanji – violin
  - Patrick Goodwin – violin
  - Alex McLeod – viola
  - Sarah Steeves – cello
- Kate Tavasoli – conductor

Production

- Roberto Occhipinti – producer
- Keyan Emami – audio design
- Pouya Hamidi – recording, editing & mixing
- Reuben Ghose – mastering
- Kate Tavasoli – audio assistant
- Mehdi Farahani – graphic design
- Revolution Recording Studio A, Toronto, ON
