= Undisrupted =

Canadian television series

Undisrupted is a Canadian television series, which premiered in August 2021 on CBC Gem. Created in conjunction with the National Arts Centre, the series commissioned four figures in Canadian classical and opera music to create and perform a half-hour symphonic work with the National Arts Centre Orchestra.

The series was created by Donna Feore and Alexander Shelley, in part as a response to the NAC's inability to stage traditional theatre shows during the COVID-19 pandemic in Canada.

== Episodes ==
1. "Forgotten Coast" — Measha Brueggergosman
2. "Iskra" — Ana Sokolovic
3. "A Guide to the Orchestra" — Nicole Lizée
4. "Music Is My Medicine" — Shawnee Kish
