= Leonard Enns =

Canadian classical composer

Leonard Jacob Enns (born 1948) is a Canadian composer of classical music. He is professor emeritus of the University of Waterloo.

== Early life and education ==
Enns was born on 2 February 1948 in Winnipeg, Manitoba. He has undergraduate degrees in music from Canadian Mennonite Bible College and Wilfrid Laurier University, and an M.Mus. in choral conducting and Ph.D. from Northwestern University, where his doctoral thesis (1982) was "The sacred choral music of Harry Somers : an analytical study". He is an Associate of the Royal Conservatory of Music in Toronto.

== Musical career ==
Enns was musical director of the United Mennonite Educational Institute in Leamington, Ontario from 1969 to 1972, and joined the teaching faculty of Conrad Grebel College of the University of Waterloo in 1977. He founded the chapel choir of Conrad Grebel College in 1977 and conducted it until 2010, during which time it made six CDs.

He has composed some 65 works, mostly of choral music. He won the 2008 Polyphonos competition in the "International Composer" section. His "Nocturne" was nominated for the Juno Award for Classical Composition of the Year in 2010. His A Little More Time won the Chronos Vocal Ensemble's fourth annual composition competition in 2020.
