= Jocelyn Morlock =

Canadian musical artist (1969–2023)

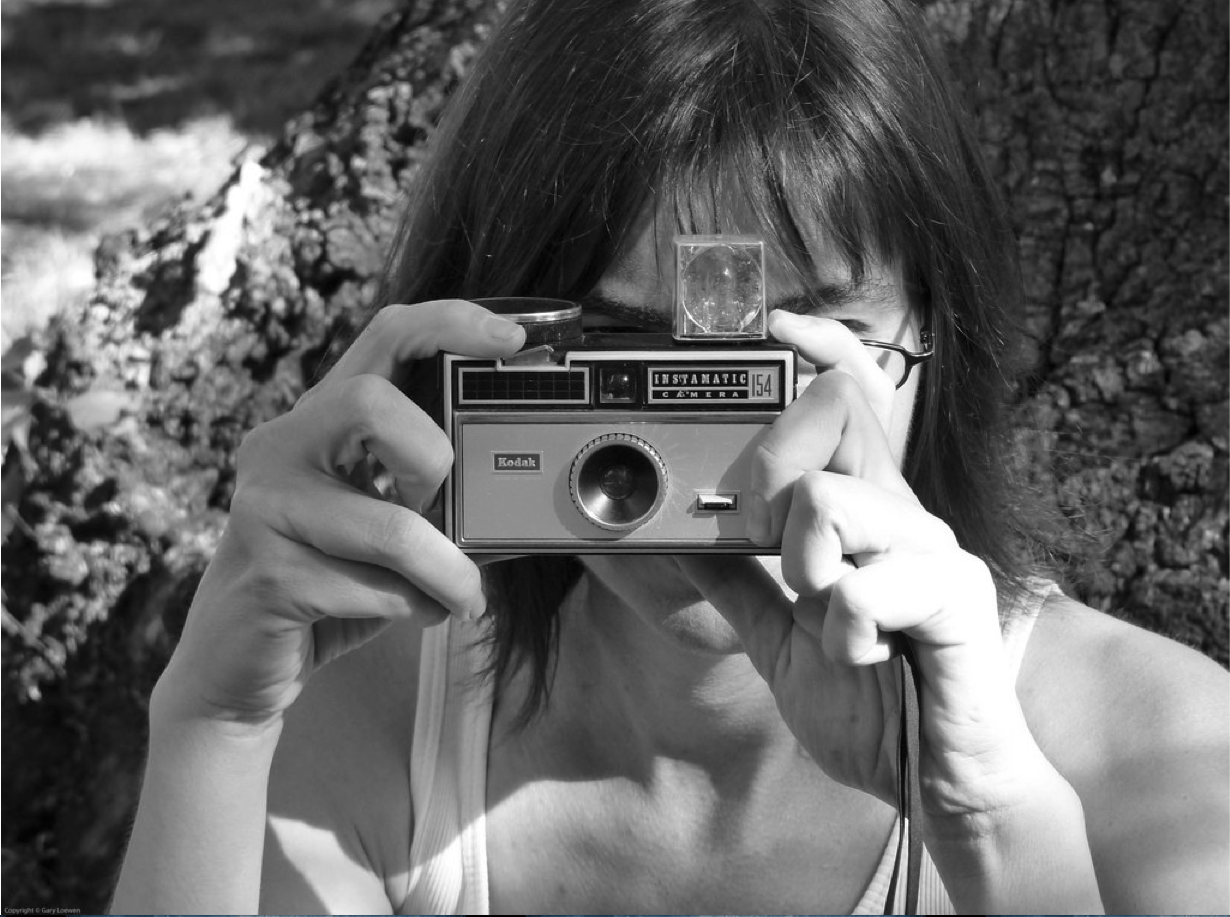

Background information
- Born: 14 December 1969; Saint Boniface, Manitoba, Canada
- Died: 27 March 2023 (aged 53) Vancouver, British Columbia, Canada
- Genres: Classical, contemporary classical, post-modern classical
- Occupation: Composer
- Years active: 1996–2023

Jocelyn Morlock (14 December 1969 – 27 March 2023) was a Canadian composer and music educator based in Vancouver, British Columbia. Her piece My Name is Amanda Todd won the 2018 Juno Award for Classical Composition of the Year.

== Early life and education ==
Morlock was born in Saint Boniface, Manitoba on 14 December 1969. She studied piano with Robert Richardson, Sr. and completed a Bachelor of Music in piano performance at Brandon University (B.Mus. 1994), where her teachers included Gerhard Ginader (electroacoustic music) and T. Patrick Carrabré (composition). She received both a master's degree and a Doctorate of Musical Arts from the University of British Columbia (M.Mus. 1996, DMA 2002) where her composition teachers included Stephen Chatman, Keith Hamel, and the late Russian-Canadian composer Nikolai Korndorf.

== Career ==
Morlock was composer-in-residence with the Vancouver Symphony Orchestra (2014-2019), after completing her term (2012-2014) as inaugural composer-in-residence for Vancouver's Music on Main, and co-host of ISCM World New Music Days 2017.

Her international career was launched at the 1999 International Society for Contemporary Music's World Music Days with Romanian performances of her quartet Bird in the Tangled Sky. She placed in the top 10 at the 2002 International Rostrum of Composers, and was the winner of the 2004 Canadian Music Centre Prairie Region Emerging Composers competition.

Morlock wrote the imposed work for several music competitions including the 2008 Eckhardt-Gramatté National Music Competition (Involuntary Love Songs) and the 2005 Montreal International Music Competition (Amore). She won the SOCAN Jan V. Matejcek New Classical Music Award in 2018.

Morlock's piece My Name is Amanda Todd premiered on 19 May 2016. It is a reflection on the life of Canadian Amanda Todd. It was commissioned and premiered by the National Arts Centre Orchestra as part of the multimedia symphonic work Life Reflected. The piece won the 2018 Juno Award for Classical Composition of the Year.

== Style ==
Morlock's music exhibits a quirky and eccentric post-modernism, but is specially centred on emotion. Her musical language is typically tonal or modal, but is expanded with extended techniques and colouristic effects.

== Personal life ==
Morlock was the longtime partner of Hard Rubber Orchestra director and trumpeter John Korsrud.

== Death ==
Morlock died on 27 March 2023, at the age of 53.

== Selected works ==
- Bird in the Tangled Sky (1997)
- Lacrimosa (2000)
- Exaudi (2004)
- Music from the Romantic Era (2005)
- Amore (2005)
- half-light, somnolent rains (2005)
- Cobalt (2009)
- Aeromancy (2011)
- My Name is Amanda Todd (2016)
- Lucid Dreams (2017; cello concerto)

== Discography ==
- Cobalt, Centrediscs CMCCD 20014 (2014)
- Halcyon, Centrediscs CMCCD 23817 (2017)

== Awards and nominations ==
=== JUNO Awards ===
Classical Composition of the Year

- Won: My Name is Amanda Todd (2018)
- Nominated: Exaudi (2011)

=== Western Canadian Music Awards ===
Classical Composer of the Year

- Won: (2018)

Classical Composition of the Year

- Won: Cobalt (2015)

Classical Recording of the Year

- Nominated: Cobalt (2015)

== See also ==
- 2018 Juno Awards winners Juno Awards of 2018
- 2011 Juno Awards nominees Juno Awards of 2011
