= Larysa Kuzmenko =

Canadian composer and pianist

Larysa Kuzmenko (born 1956) is a Juno Awards-nominated Canadian composer and pianist based in Toronto, Ontario. She currently teaches on the music faculties of The Royal Conservatory of Music and the University of Toronto.

== Early life ==
Kuzmenko was born and raised in Mississauga, Ontario, to Ukrainian parents. She studied music at the University of Toronto, earning a master's degree in composition. She is married to fellow composer Gary Kulesha.

== Career ==
Kuzmenko has been commissioned to write pieces by the Canadian Broadcasting Corporation, the Hannaford Street Silver Band, the International Women's Brass Conference, the Laidlaw Foundation, the Oberlin Choristers, the Ontario Arts Council, and the Royal Canadian College of Organists.

In 2003 her work "Impromptu and Toccata" was premiered in Toronto. Cellist Yamagami Kaori and pianist Peter Longworth presented her composition "Fantasy for Solo Violincello" at the University of Toronto Walter Hall in 2008; the work was commissioned by the Women's Musical Club of Toronto.

Kuzmenko's oratorio "Golden Harvest" was first performed by the Winnipeg Symphony in 2016. For Canada's 150th Anniversary, she collaborated with Newfoundland playwright Robert Chafe to create a choral adaptation of Brahms Intermezzo. The work was performed by the National Arts Centre Orchestra and the Shallaway Youth Choir of St. John's, Newfoundland.

Many of Kuzmenko's works have been published by Boosey and Hawkes. Her composition "Mysterious Summer Night" was performed by Christina Petrowska Quilico and included on her 2018 album Global Sirens.

== Selected compositions ==
- "Homeland" for piano and women's choir (1978)
- Elegy and Song for Flute, Vibraphone, Harp, and Soprano (1978–79)
- Fantasy for Band (1981)
- Concertino for Vibraphone and Marimba with Orchestra (1986–87)
- Sonata for Cello and Piano, "A Dream Within A Dream" (1992)
- Concerto for Accordion (1993)
- "A Prayer" for String Orchestra (1993)
- Piano Concerto No. 1 (1996)
- "Suite of Dances" for flute, cello and piano (1997)
- "In memoriam: To the Victims of Chernobyl" (1997)
- Concertino for Organ and Strings (1998)
- "Lilith, for String Quartet with English Horn (2000)
- Piano Concerto No. 2 (2000)
- Capriccio for string quartet, percussion, and flute (2002)
- Impromptu and Toccata for Brass Quintet (2003)
- "Sea Without A Shore" for Cello and Orchestra (2010)
- "Fantasy" for cello (2008)
- "Polynia" for piano, violin, and basset horn (Premiered 2010)
- "Behold the Night" for youth choir (2011)
- Metropolis Overture (2014)
- "Diabolic Dance" and "Mysterious Summer's Night" for piano (2014)
- "Golden Harvest" an oratorio (2016)
- 3 Ukrainian-themed songs (Premiered 2017)
- Piano concerto No. 3 (2019)

- Mysterious Summer's Night for piano (List D of RCM Level 8 Piano Repertoire, Sixth Edition)
