= Vivian Fung =

Canadian composer (born 1975)

Vivian Fung (born 1975) is a JUNO Award-winning Canadian composer who writes music for orchestras, operas, quartets, and piano. Her compositions have been performed internationally.

== Early life and education ==
Fung was born in Edmonton, Alberta. She wrote her first compositions at age 7. She began studies with Violet Archer and later studied with Narcis Bonet in Paris. She received her bachelor's degree, masters, and doctorate from The Juilliard School in New York City in 1996, 1997, and 2002, respectively. Her composition mentors included David Diamond and Robert Beaser, piano mentors included György Sándor and Ernesto Lejano, and conducting mentor was Miguel Harth-Beyoda.

== Career ==
NPR calls Fung "one of today's most eclectic composers," and The Philadelphia Inquirer said she has a "stunningly original compositional voice" through her use of blending Western musical forms with musical ideas from many cultures, including Balinese and Javanese gamelan, and folk songs from minority regions of China.

Fung travels often, exploring the diverse cultures of North Vietnam, Spain, and Bali, Indonesia. In 2012, Fung traveled to Southwest China for ethno-musicological research to study minority music and cultures in the Yunnan province. It was a continuation of the research that previously inspired "Yunnan Folk Songs" (2011). The project was commissioned by Fulcrum Point New Music in Chicago with support from the MAP Fund. After the world premiere in March 2011 of Fung's work "Yunnan Folk Songs", The Chicago Tribune wrote, "'Yunnan Folk Songs' stood out ... [with] a winning rawness that went beyond exoticism."

Fung has been the composer-in-residence of the Delaware Chamber Music Festival, the Music in the Loft chamber music series in Chicago, the San Jose Chamber Orchestra, and the Billings Symphony. She also completed residencies at the MacDowell, Yaddo, and Banff arts colonies, as well as residencies at National Sawdust, Alba Music Festival Composition Program, New York State School Music Association, Mostly Modern Festival Institute, Vancouver Symphony Orchestra School of Music, National Orchestra Institute + Festival, and Atlantic Center for the Arts.

In 2012, the Naxos Canadian Classics label released the world premiere recording of Fung's "Violin Concerto #1", her "Piano Concerto (Dreamscapes)", and "Glimpses" for prepared piano, with the Metropolis Ensemble conducted by Andrew Cyr, featuring violinist Kristin Lee, and pianist Conor Hanick. Several of her works have also been released commercially on the Telarc, Çedille, and Signpost labels. Fung's "Violin Concerto" received the 2013 JUNO Award for Classical Composition of the Year.

Fung's "String Quartet No.3" was commissioned by the 11th Banff International String Quartet Competition (BISQC). It was performed by ten string quartets; the American group, the Dover Quartet, won first prize. The Calgary Herald lauded the piece and referred to it as "Dark Journeys". As music critic Stephan Bonfield pointed out, the work is Fung's emotional response to the world conflict during that year, seen from the point of view of her own family's struggles.

== Awards ==
Fung has received a number of awards and grants, including the 2012 John Simon Guggenheim Memorial Foundation Fellowship, New York Foundation for the Arts’ Gregory Millard Fellowship, and from ASCAP, BMI, the American Music Center, the MAP Fund, Music Alive!, and the League of American Orchestras, American Composers Forum, and the Canada Council for the Arts.

Fung's "Violin Concerto" earned her the 2013 Juno Award for Classical Composition of the Year.

== Works ==
=== Orchestral ===
- Parade (2022) 10' For chamber orchestra. Commissioned by ROCO and premiered by ROCO in Houston, TX on April 29, 2023
- Flute Concerto: Storm Within (2021) 20' Versions available for flute solo with chamber orchestra and full orchestra. Commissioned by Vancouver Symphony Orchestra. Premiered by the Vancouver Symphony Orchestra on November 11, 2022.
- Prayer (2020) 5' For full orchestra. Commissioned by CBC Music in collaboration with the Toronto Symphony Orchestra. Premiered by Yannick Nézet-Séguin and 35 musicians representing 26 orchestras across Canada on June 22, 2020.
- Trumpet Concerto (2019) 15' For trumpet and chamber orchestra. Commissioned by Mary Elizabeth Bowden and a consortium of orchestras. Premiered by Mary Elizabeth Bowden and the Erie Philharmonic on March 7, 2020.
- A Child's Dream of Toys (2018) 11' For full orchestra. Commissioned by Winnipeg Symphony Orchestra and premiered as part of the Winnipeg Symphony Orchestra New Music Festival on January 30, 2019.
- Concerto for Two Violins and String Orchestra (2018) 15' For two solo violins and strings. Commissioned by Manitoba Chamber Orchestra and premiered on March 19, 2019.
- Earworms (2018) 12' For full orchestra. Commissioned by Canada's National Arts Centre Orchestra and premiered March 22, 2018 in Ottawa and Toronto, Canada.
- Baroque Melting (2017) 6' For harpsichord and divisi strings. Commissioned by San José Chamber Orchestra and premiered on October 8, 2017.
- Launch! (2016) 2' For full orchestra. Commissioned by Toronto Symphony Orchestra and premiered on February 4, 2017.
- Biennale Snapshots (2015) 23' For full orchestra. Commissioned for the Vancouver Biennale, in celebration of the 2014-2016 Open Air Museum installations. Premiered by the Vancouver Symphony Orchestra on September 26 and 28, 2015.
- Graffiti Mashup (2015) 7' For full orchestra. Commissioned for the Vancouver Biennale, in celebration of the 2014-2016 Open Air Museum installations. Premiered by the Vancouver Symphony Orchestra on September 26 and 28, 2015.
- Violin Concerto No. 2: Of Snow and Ice (2014) 24' For violin and full orchestra. Commissioned by Toronto Symphony Orchestra and premiered on February 28, 2015.
- Fanfare (2014) 6' For full orchestra. Commissioned by Alabama Symphony and premiered February 2014.
- Harp Concerto (2013) 22' For harp, percussion, and strings. Co-commissioned by Alabama Symphony, Staatstheater Karlsruhe, Metropolis Ensemble, The Phillips Collection, and San José Chamber Orchestra and premiered by Alabama Symphony on February 5, 2014.
- Aqua (2012) 5' For full orchestra. Commissioned by the Chicago Sinfonietta and premiered on June 8–9, 2013 in Chicago, Illinois.
- Dust Devils (2011, rev. 2014) 10' For full orchestra. Commissioned by Eastern Music Festival for their 50th anniversary and premiered on July 30, 2011, in Greensboro, NC.
- Violin Concerto No. 1 (2011) 21' For violin and chamber orchestra. Commissioned by Metropolis Ensemble and premiered September 15, 2011 in New York.
- Piano Concerto: Dreamscapes (2009) 25' For piano and chamber orchestra. Commissioned by Metropolis Ensemble and premiered on November 19–20, 2009 in Le Poisson Rouge, New York.
- String Sinfonietta (2008, rev. 2011) 18' For string orchestra. Commissioned by San José Chamber Orchestra and premiered May 2008.
- Butterfly Variations (2005) 18'. For string orchestra. Part of Music Alive! composer-in-residence program with San José Chamber Orchestra, co-sponsored by Meet the Composer and the American Symphony Orchestra League.
- Pizzicato (2001) 4' Third movement of string quartet, arranged for string orchestra. Premiered by San José Chamber Orchestra December 2001
- Three Love Songs in Chinese (2001) 12'. For soprano and chamber orchestra. Text: Chinese Love Poetry in Mandarin
- Concertino Notturno (1999) 15'. For solo flute, harpsichord, and strings. Commissioned by San José Chamber Orchestra and premiered June 2001.
- Blaze (1998) 13' For full orchestra. Commissioned by Seattle Symphony Orchestra and premiered May 4, 1998.

=== Large Ensembles ===
- Indigenous Rites: Concerto for baritone saxophone and brass band (2013) 13' For baritone saxophone and brass band. Commissioned by the Hannaford Street Silver Band and premiered October 20, 2013 in Toronto, Ontario.
- Gamelan Grunge (2012) 8' Arrangement of Kreasi Mekanis Mainan ("Mechanical Toys"). Premiered September 2012 by CONTACT Contemporary Ensemble in Toronto, Ontario.
- Kreasi Mekanis Mainan ("Mechanical Toys") (2012) 8' For samara dana gamelan ensemble. Commissioned by Queens College, Gamelan Yowana Sari and premiered December 2012 at Queens College, New York.
- The Shaman Speaks (2009, rev. 2012) 4' Written for clarinet choir, arranged for saxophone choir. Premiered December 2012 by the University of Toronto saxophone choir.

=== Chamber Music ===
- Down and Dirty for clarinet and piano (2023) 18' Commissioned by Cape Cod Chamber Music Festival and premiered August 11, 2023.
- Ominous Machine II for 2 piano and 2 percussion (2022-2023) 14' Commissioned by the Network for New Music and premiered May 7, 2023 at the Settlement Music School in Philadelphia, PA.
- Ominous Machine for piano trio (2021) 5' Premiered November 7, 2023 at the San Francisco Conservatory.
- String Quartet No. 5 (2021) 13'30" Commissioned by Lafayette String Quartet and premiered February 11, 2022 at the University of Victoria, British Columbia.
- Sparks for flute, yangqin, and percussion (2021) 11' Commissioned and premiered by Tangram Collective in 2022.
- Corona Morphs for pierrot ensemble and percussion (2021) 15' Commissioned by Standing Wave Ensemble and premiered November 29, 2021 in Vancouver.
- (Un)Wandering Souls for percussion quartet (2021) 3' Commissioned by Cambodian Living Arts and Metropolis Ensemble and premiered March 18, 2021.
- String Quartet No. 4 "Insects and Machines" (2019) 12' Commissioned by Red Bank Chamber Music Society and premiered by the American String Quartet on May 5, 2019.
- Shifting Landscapes for string quartet (2018) 4' Commissioned by Ensemble Made in Canada.
- Frenetic Memories for clarinet and string quartet (2017) 15' Commissioned by The Chamber Music Society of Lincoln Center, The Philadelphia Chamber Music Society, and Chamber Music Northwest. Premiered November 9, 2017.
- Bounce for French horn, violin, and piano (2016) 12' Commissioned by Women's Musical Club of Toronto and premiered November 24, 2016.
- Twist for violin and guitar (2014) 13' Commissioned by Astral Artists and premiered April 25, 2014 in Philadelphia, PA.
- The Voices Inside My Head for percussion (2014) 15' Commissioned by the Bowdoin International Music Festival and premiered August 6, 2014.
- String Quartet No. 3 (2013) 10' Commissioned by the Banff Centre and the Canadian Broadcasting Corporation and premiered August 26-September 1, 2013.
- Birdsong for violin and piano (2012) 10' Commissioned by the Delaware Chamber Music Festival and premiered June 22, 2012.
- Javanese Court Song for flute and piano (2011) 3' Commissioned by the New Jersey Music Teachers' Association.
- String Quartet No. 2 (2009) 18' Commissioned by Shanghai Quartet and premiered April 23, 2009 in Washington D.C.
- Billy Collins Suite for clarinet, cello, and piano (2008, rev. 2016) 12' Commissioned by Music in the Loft (MILT), John Bruce Yeh, and the Lincoln Trio. Premiered May 4, 2008.
- Miniatures for clarinet and string quartet (2005, rev. 2016) 13' Commissioned by Music in the Loft and premiered November 19, 2005 in Chicago, IL.
- Night Impressions for traditional Chinese instruments (2005) 18' Commissioned by Music from China and premiered November 5, 2005.
- String Quartet No. 1 (2003) 18' Commissioned by Composer Assistance Program of the American Music Center and premiered January 24, 2004 in Columbus, OH.
- Chanted Rituals for trumpet/flugelhorn and percussion (2002) 14' Commissioned by The Modern Trio and premiered April 28, 2002 in Lausanne, Switzerland.
- Pizzicato for string quartet (2001) 4' Commissioned by Composer Assistance Program of the American Music Center and premiered January 24, 2004 in Columbus, OH.
- Scherzo for piano trio (1998) 4' Commissioned by Friends of Today's Music
- Rhapsody for trumpet and piano (1995) 8' Commissioned by Banff Centre for the Arts and premiered July 5, 1995.

=== Solo works ===
- Sparkle for percussion (2023) 3' Commissioned by Ensemble For These Times and premiered June 3, 2023.
- Shimmer for percussion (2022) 3' Commissioned by Ensemble For These Times and premiered April 9, 2022.
- Apéritif for trumpet (2021) 1'30" Commissioned by Mary Elizabeth Bowden and premiered September 14, 2021 at the Festival of New Trumpet Music.
- The Ice Is Talking for percussion and electronics (2018) 12' Commissioned by Banff Centre for Arts and Creativity and premiered July 7, 2018 at Banff, AB, Canada.
- Humanoid for cello and prerecorded electronics (2017) 14' Commissioned by Manhattan Chamber Players, Arts on the Ave, International Contemporary Ensemble, Rachel Mercer, San José Chamber Orchestra, and Astral Artists. Premiered August 27, 2017 at the Crescent City Chamber Music Festival in New Orleans, LA.
- Sketch for cello and electronics (2015) 4' Commissioned by Manhattan Chamber Players and premiered December 7, 2015 in New York, New York.
- Primitive Dance and Folksong for piano (2011) Commissioned by the New Jersey Music Teachers Association and premiered at the New Jersey Music Teachers Association Conference November 19, 2011.
- Keeping Time for piano (2011) 4' Commissioned by the New Jersey Music Teachers Association and premiered at the New Jersey Music Teachers Association Conference November 19, 2011.
- Glimpses for piano (2006, rev. 2016) 10' Commissioned by Jenny Lin and premiered April 2006 at the Miami ISCM Festival.
- Silhouettes for erhu (1997) 5' Premiered March 12, 1997 at Clark Studio Theater in New York, New York.

=== Choral/Vocal ===
- Pot Roast à La RBG (2018) 4' For voice and piano. Commissioned by Jane and James Ginsburg in celebration of Ruth Bader Ginsburg's 80th birthday.
- Yunnan Folk Songs (2011) 19' For mezzo-soprano, baritone, flute, oboe, calrinet, sheng horn (Chinese reed), percussion, violin, viola, and cello. Commissioned by Fulcrum Point New Music Project in Chicago and premiered March 22, 2011 in Chicago, IL.
- Recommendation (2008) 7' For mixed a cappella choir and percussion. Commissioned by Suwon Civic Chorale and premiered May 28, 2010 in Suwon, South Korea.
- Sanci Kuni (2010) 4' For mixed a cappella choir. Commissioned by Suwon Civic Chorale and premiered May 28, 2010 in Suwon, South Korea.
- Kecak Attack! (2008) 4' For mixed a cappella choir. Commissioned by Suwon Civic Chorale and premiered May 28, 2010 in Suwon, South Korea.
- Six Haiku (2004) 10' For baritone and piano. Commissioned by Vox Series and premiered May 25, 2004 in Symphony Space, NY as part of the Vox Series sponsored by New York City Opera and American Opera Projects.
- Kecak! (2004) 4' For mixed a cappella choir. Commissioned by Pacific Mozart Ensemble and premiered April 20, 2004 in San Francisco, CA.
- Songs of Childhood (2002) 8' For voice and piano. Commissioned by Atlantic Center for the Arts and premiered May 2002 in Tuscany, Italy.
- Night Songs (1999) 18' For mezzo-soprano and mixed chamber ensemble. Commissioned by Pittsburgh New Music Ensemble and premiered April 19, 1999 in Pittsburgh, PA.

=== Opera ===
- Two Opera Scenes: Grover and Friends/Alarm (2021) 8' For soprano and one percussionist. Commissioned by Edmonton Opera as part of the Wild Rose Project. Premiered October 2021.
- The Legend of Sleepy Hollow (2006) For Operatic voice. Commissioned by Drama of Works and premiered from October 31, 2006, to November 5, 2006, in New York, New York.
- The Night Singer (2004) Mini-opera for soprano, tenor, bass-baritone, and piano. Commissioned by American Opera Projects and premiered October 7–8, 2004 in Brooklyn, New York.

== Discography ==
Album	Label	Release date	Piece(s) Included	Awards
Mary Elizabeth Bowden, untitled album	Cedille Records	2024	Trumpet Concerto	
Jasper String Quartet: Fung String Quartets	Sono Luminus	October 27, 2023	String Quartet No. 1, No. 2, No. 3, and No. 4	
Jin Yin	Cedille Records	February 7, 2020	Birdsong	
Ensemble Made in Canada: Mosaïque	Canadian Music Centre	January 24, 2020	Shifting Landscapes	JUNO nomination for "Classical Album of the Year: Solo or Chamber"
Notorious RBG in Song	Cedille Records	June 8, 2018	Pot Roast à La RBG	
Mary Kathleen Ernst: Keeping Time	Innova Records	March 25, 2014	Keeping Time	
All-Fung CD: Dreamscapes	NAXOS Canadian Classics	September 25, 2012	Dreamscapes; Violin Concerto; Glimpses	2013 JUNO Award for "Classical Composition of the Year"
Billy Collins Suite	Cedille Records	October 27, 2009	Billy Collins Suite	
Apparitions	Signpost Records	October 24, 2008	Chant from Glimpses	
Ying Quartet: Dim Sum	Telarc Records	January 15, 2008	Pizzicato	
Composers in the Loft	Cedille Records	January 1, 2007	Miniatures	
