= Nicole Lizée =

Canadian composer of contemporary music (born 1973)

- Born: Nicole Lizée; 7 April 1973 (age 53); Gravelbourg, Saskatchewan, Canada
- Genres: Musique concrète; contemporary; turntablism; modernism; psychedelia; shoegaze; indie rock; post-rock; new prog
- Occupations: Composer; musician; sound Designer; producer
- Instruments: Keyboard; tape machine
- Years active: 1997–present
- Label: New Amsterdam Records
- Website: nicolelizee.com

Nicole Lizée (born 7 April 1973) is a Canadian composer of contemporary music. She was born in Gravelbourg, Saskatchewan and received a MMus from McGill University. She lives in Montreal, Quebec. She was a member of Montreal indie rock band The Besnard Lakes.

== Career ==
Lizée has been described as a "brilliant musical scientist." She takes her inspiration from various sources including early MTV videos, rave culture, films by Alfred Hitchcock and Stanley Kubrick, and 1960s psychedelia.

She has composed pieces for the Kronos Quartet, the San Francisco Symphony, the National Arts Centre Orchestra, the Toronto Symphony Orchestra, the Montreal Symphony Orchestra, the Gryphon Trio, the Société de musique contemporaine du Québec, the Australian Art Orchestra, So Percussion and Eve Egoyan. Her music has been performed at international venues including Carnegie Hall, the Royal Albert Hall, the Muziekgebouw aan 't IJ, and the Cité de la Musique.

In 2013, she was awarded the Jules Léger Prize for New Chamber Music. In 2017, she received the Society of Composers, Authors and Music Publishers of Canada's Jan V. Matejcek Award for new classical music. Lizée is a fellow of the Civitella Ranieri Foundation. In 2016, she received a Lucas Artists Fellowship. Her composition This Will Not Be Televised placed in the International Rostrum of Composers' Top 10 Works in 2008. Her Hitchcock Études was featured at 2014 Music Days in Poland. She was nominated for a Juno Award in 2016 and a Prix Opus in 2013. She received the Robert Fleming Prize from the Canada Council for the Arts in 2002. She was named composer-in-residence for Vancouver's Music on Main festival from 2016 to 2018. She also received a Dora Mavor Moore Award for opera.

In 2021, she created the symphonic short film "A Guide to the Orchestra" for the National Arts Centre/CBC Gem series Undisrupted.

In 2024, she received a Juno Award for Classical Composition of the Year for Don't Throw Your Head in Your Hands.

== Discography ==
Solo studio albums

- This Will Not Be Televised (2008), Centrediscs
- Bookburners (2014), Centrediscs

Collaborative albums

- Gravitron for flute, clarinet, percussion, piano, violin, cello (1997)
- RPM for large ensemble and solo turntablist (1999). [Picc. fl., fl., ob., cl. (+b. cl.), bssn, hrn, 2 tpts, tbn, 3 perc., hrp, pno (+cel.), 2 vlns, vla, vc, db]. Work for Masters thesis. Premiered by the McGill Contemporary Music Ensemble in 1999.
- Throwingstars! for violin, viola, cello, piano (2000)
- Planet Spectra for 2 flutes, 2 cellos, 2 percussion (2001).
- Sumo for 10 players (2001). [Fl., cl., b. cl., bssn, perc., vln, vla, vc, db, solo pno].
- Analogue Out for 11 players (2001). [Fl., cl. (+b.cl.), alto sax., tpt, tbn, perc, pno, vln, vla, vc, db].
- Jupiter Moon Menace for 11 players (2001). [Fl., cl. (+b.cl.), alto sax., tpt, tbn, perc, pno, vln, vla, vc, db].
- Carpal Tunnels for alto sax, electric guitar, rhodes piano, double bass, drum kit (2001).
- Télévision for flute and 2 percussion (2001). Commissioned by Lithium Ensemble.
- Left Brain/ Right Brain for 7 players (2002). [Fl (+picc.), cl (+b.cl.), tpt, tbn, perc, pno, vln, vc, db]. Commissioned by L’Ensemble contemporain de Montréal with the assistance of le Conseil des arts et des lettres du Québec.
- Live! for virtual orchestra: constructed of samples from my previous works (2003).
- Album Leaf for viola, piano/rhodes, percussion and turntablist (2003).
- King Kong and Fay Wray for orchestra and solo turntablist (2004). [3 2 3 3/4 2 3 1/timp 3 perc. 2 harps celesta/10 8 7 6 4/turntables, sampler]. Commissioned by l’Orchestre Métropolitain du Grand Montréal.
- Girl, You're Living a Life of Crime for electric guitar, double bass, vibraphone, drum kit, rhodes (2004).
- Jailbreak '04 for 6 players (2004). [alto sax, elec. gtr, vln, db, perc, keyboard/sampler]. Commissioned by Ensemble Kore with the assistance of le Conseil des arts et des lettres du Québec.
- 2600 Dollar Man for 5 players and Atari 2600 Game Console (2004). [Electric guitar, keyboard/sampler, percussion, violin, double bass, Atari 2600, video projection]. Commissioned by Ensemble Kore with the assistance of le Conseil des arts et des lettres du Québec.
- Timeless Remix or bass clarinet, percussion, and sampler (2004). Commissioned by La Biennale de Montréal in collaboration with ALSOP Architects.
- Arcadiac for orchestra, 1970s/1980s Arcade Consoles and video (2005/rev. 2007). [2 2 2 2/4 2 2 1/timp 2 prc/strings, video projection]. Commissioned by l’Association des orchestres de Jeunes du Québec (AOJQ).
- RPM for large ensemble and solo turntablist [Picc. fl., fl., ob., cl. (+b. cl.), bssn, hrn, tpt, tbn, 3 perc., hrp, pno (+cel.), 2 vlns, vla, vc, db, turntables] (2005 Revision).
- Metal Jacket for tabla and harmonium. Commissioned by Shawn Mativetsky (2005).
- Nosferatu for orchestra. Commissioned by the Victoria Symphony (2006).
- Karappo Okesutura Vol. I and II for 7 players, mezzo soprano and karaoke tapes. [Fl. (+picc., alto), cl. (+b.cl.), keys, perc., gtr, vln, db, mezzo soprano]. Written with the assistance of the Canada Council for the Arts and the Conseil des arts et des lettres du Québec (2006).
- Love Theme 1978 for Simon handheld game and percussion (2006).
- This Will Not Be Televised for 7 players and turntablist. [2 percussion, 2 violins, viola, cello, double bass, turntables] (2005-2007).
- Marsh Chapel Experiment for 6 players, karaoke tapes and video [Flute, clarinet, piano/celesta, percussion (+boombox ), violin, cello (+ghetto blaster), video]. Commissioned by Continuum Ensemble with the assistance of the Canada Council for the Arts (2007).
- The Small Hours, Parts I and II for tenor saxophone, piano (+toy piano, organ, rhodes), percussion/drum kit, electric guitar. Commissioned by Bradyworks Ensemble with the assistance of the Canada Council for the Arts (2006-2007).
- Bonjour et sans Demain for bass flute, percussion, turntables, poet. Text by Thierry Dimanche (2009)
- Ringer for solo drum set (2009).
- Cryptograms for cello, electronics, and improvised DJ (2008)
- Modern Hearts for electric guitar solo (+effects) (2008)
- Promises, Promises for Fender Rhodes (+effects), piano, percussion, and new wave track (2008)
- Incense and Peppermints arrangement for orchestra and mezzo soprano (2010)
- Dust for percussion, 2 violins, cello and electronica (2010)
- Hitchcock Études for piano, glitch and film (2010)
- Sculptress for clarinet, piano, percussion, violin, cello and vintage machines. Commissioned by Standing Wave with the assistance of the Canada Council for the Arts (2010)
- Lock the Door, Swallow the Key for 18 piece big band. Commissioned by the Kaufman Center for the Performing Arts/Darcy James Argue’s Secret Society (2011)
- Death to Kosmiche for string quartet and electronics. Commissioned by Kronos Quartet with the Margaret Dorfman and the Ralph I. Dorfman Family Fund (2011)
- Traumnovelle for 7 players and turntablist (2011)
- Music for Body-Without-Organs for flute, clarinet, piano, percussion, violin and cello (2011)
- Cathedral Mountain for string orchestra and violin solo. Commissioned by la Société Radio-Canada and the McGill Chamber Orchestra (2011)
- Bookburners for violoncello and turntablist (2008/rev.2012)
- White Label Experiment for percussion quartet and live electronics. Commissioned for So Percussion by Soundstreams/the Royal Conservatory of Music with the Canada Council for the Arts (2012)
- 2012: Concert for Power Trio and Orchestra for orchestra and solo electric guitar, electric bass, and drum kit (2012)
- The Golden Age of Radiophonic Workshop (Fibre-Optic Flowers) for string quartet and electronics (2012). Commissioned for Kronos Quartet by BBC Radio 3 for the 2012 BBC Proms (2012)
- The Man with the Golden Arms for chamber ensemble, percussion sextet and drumkit soloist (2012)
- Lock the Door, Swall the Key for brass quintet, electric guitar, drumkit and track (2013)
- Kubrick Études for piano and glitch (soundtrack and film) (2013)
- Son of the Man With the Golden Arms for percussion quartet, 2 electric guitars, and drumkit soloist (2013)
- Hymnals for string quartet and electronics. Commissioned by Kronos Quartet with the Canada Council for the Arts (2013)
- Ouijist for alto flute, percussion, violin, double bass and electronics (2013)
- Hitchcock Études for string quartet, percussion, and glitch (soundtrack and film) (2014)
- Katana of Choice for percussion quartet and drumkit soloist (2014)
- Behind the Sound of Music for orchestra and glitch (soundtrack, film) (2014)
- Hymns to Pareidolia for large ensemble and electronics (2014)
- Phonographenlieder for string quartet, percussion, piano, mezzo soprano and turntablist (2014)
- Zoetropes for reed quintet and Loop Stations (2014)
- Kool-Aid Acid Test #17: Blotterberry Bursst for sinfonietta, soundtrack and video (2015)
- La Callas Fantasie for soprano, percussion, turntables and film (2015)
- Wunderkammer for piano trio (vln, vc, pno) and chamber orchestra (2015)
- Colliding Galaxies: Colour and Tones for 6 players, soundtrack and film (2015
- Family Sling-A-Long and Game Night for guitar, drum kit, and 1970s board games (2015)
- How to Fake Your Own Death for brass octet, percussion and solo horn (2015)
- Isabella Blow at Somerset House for string quartet (2015)
- Tarantino Études for bass flute, soundtrack, and film (2015)
- The Filthy Fifteen for percussion, soundtrack, and film (2016)
- Lynch Études for piano, soundtrack, and film (2016)
- House of Stylus for piano and turntables (2016)
- 8-Bit Urbex for 10 players, soundtrack, and film (2016)
- Bondarsphere for orchestra, soundtrack, and film (2016)
- Darkness is Not Well Lit for string quartet (2016)
- Another Living Soul for string quartet (2016)
- Keep Driving, I’m Dreaming ballet for orchestra and soundtrack (2016)
- Softcore for piano, percussion, electronics, soundtrack, and video (2017)
- Tarantino Études for bass flute, soundtrack, and film (2015)
- Black MIDI for solo string quartet, orchestra, soundtrack, and video (2017)
- Sasktronica for trumpet, percussion, turntables/electronics, soundtrack, and video (2017)
- Malfunctionlieder for solo voice (Soprano, Mezzo), piano, soundtrack, and video (2017)
- Legacy of Love for full orchestra, voice, soundtrack, and video (2017)
- Urbexploitation (Leave Nothing But Footprints, Break Nothing But Silence) for vln, vla, vc, hrpschrd, soundtrack, and video (2017)
- Tarantino Études (Doppelganger and Duel) for two bass flutes, soundtrack, and video (2017)
- La terre a des maux for full orchestra and solo vocalist/rapper (2018)
- Folk Noir/Canadiana for 4 vlns, 2 vlas, 2 vc, db, 4 percussion, soundtrack, and video (2018)
- The Bessborough Hotel for piano quartet (2018)
- I Still Think About You for solo percussion (2018)
- Vanisxche for orchestra (2024)
