= José Evangelista =

Spanish composer and educator (1943–2023)

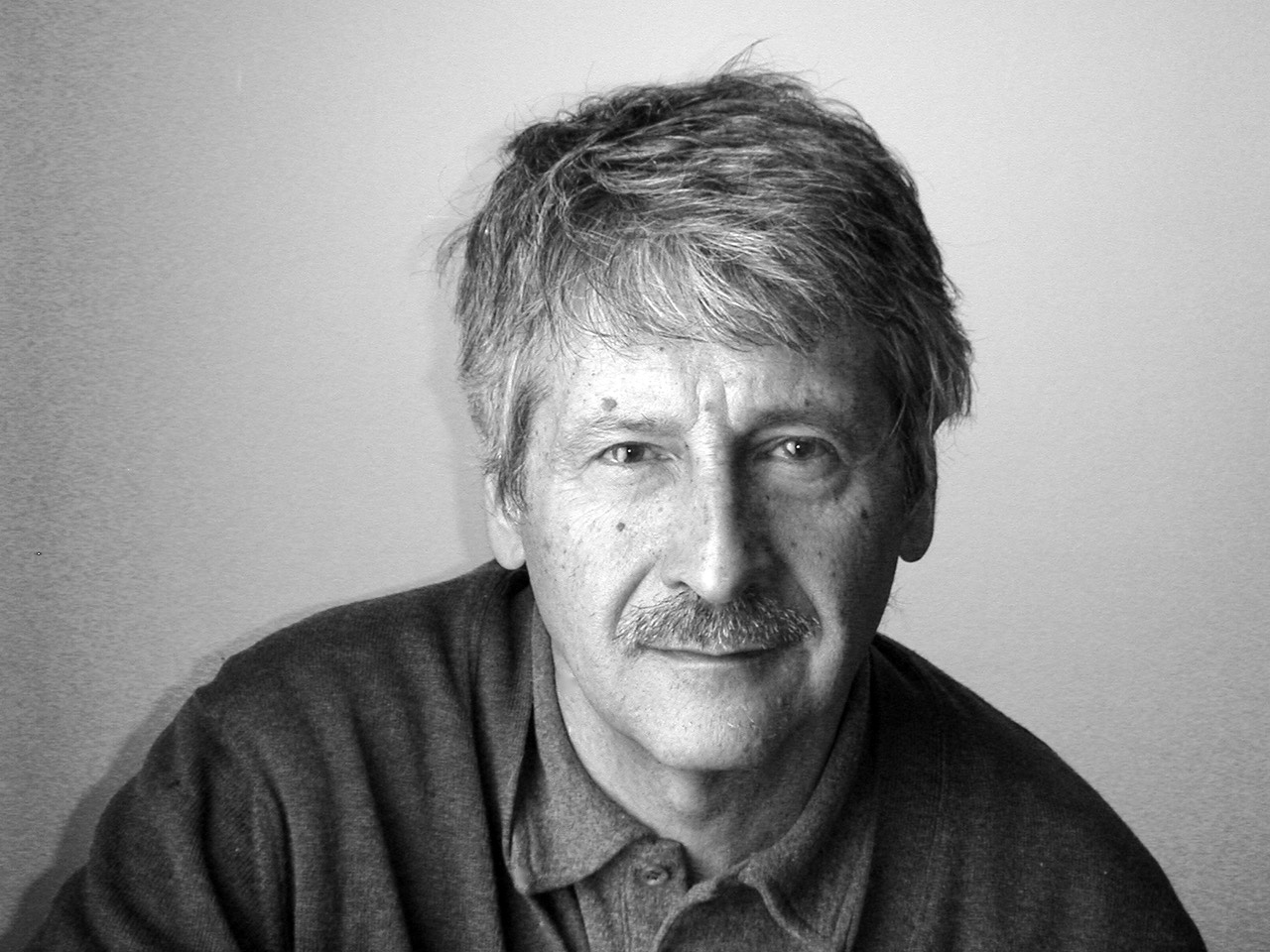
- Born: 5 August 1943; Valencia, Spain
- Died: 10 January 2023 (aged 79); Montreal, Quebec, Canada
- Occupations: Composer; academic teacher
- Organizations: Université de Montréal
- Awards: Juno Award

José Evangelista (5 August 1943 – 10 January 2023) was a Spanish composer and music educator who was based in Montreal, Canada. He was professor of composition at the Université de Montréal from 1979 to 2009. A member of the Canadian League of Composers, the Sociedad General de Autores y Editores, and an associate of the Canadian Music Centre, Evangelista was known for his commitment to contemporary classical music and non-Western music.

== Life and career ==
Born in Valencia on 5 August 1943, Evangelista began his professional training at the University of Valencia where he studied computer science for seven years and earned a degree in that subject in 1967. At the same time he pursued music courses at the Valencia Conservatory and earned a premier prix in music composition there in 1967. His most influential teacher at that school was Vicente Asencio who taught harmony, composition, and orchestration.

In 1969 Evangelista moved to Canada and settled in the city of Montreal. From 1970 to 1973 he was a pupil of André Prévost at the Université de Montréal where he earned a Master of Music in composition. In 1974, he attended the Darmstädter Ferienkurse for contemporary music, and returned in 1984 when he was named a composer-in-residence. In the autumn of 1974 he entered the graduate music program at McGill University to study composition with Bruce Mather; he earned a Doctor of Music in 1984. From 1979 he taught on the music faculty of the Université de Montréal; among his students were composers Simon Bertrand, Analia Llugdar, Samy Moussa and Ana Sokolovic. He installed a workshop of Balinese Gamelan music at the university. He held the teaching position until 2009.

Evangelista was active in Canada with the Traditions musicales du monde, a concert society dedicated to promoting non-Western music which he helped found. He developed an interest in the music and culture of Southeast Asia, and a number of his compositions reflect that interest. To pursue studies in this music, he lived in Indonesia during the summers of 1976 and 1980 and in Burma during the summer of 1986 where he studied the Javanese gamelan and Burmese piano. He was made composer-in-residence at the Akademi Musik Indonesia in Yogyakarta in 1986. In 1993 and 1994, he was composer-in-residence with the Montreal Symphony Orchestra.

Evangelista died on 10 January 2023, at age 79.

== Awards ==
In 1974 Evangelista was awarded first prize in the Confederación Espanola de Cajas de Ahorros Contest in Madrid for his En guise de fête. In 1978 he helped found Les Événements du neuf, a concert society dedicated to avant-garde music. In 1982 he was awarded a special prize from Spain's Ministry of Culture for his work Vision, and in 1988 he won first prize in the choral works competition of St Mary Magdalene's Church in Toronto for O quam suavis est. His Nuevas monodías españolas was nominated as classical composition of the year at the Juno Awards of 2005. In 2019, he received the Émile-Nelligan Foundation's Serge-Garant Prize for his life's work.

== Works ==
Evangelista's works include:

- Sonatine for flute and piano, 1971
- Un mur à peine for soprano and eight musicians, 1972
- En guise de fête for soprano and chamber ensemble, 1974
- Monsieur Plume, un homme paisible for soprano and cello, 1974
- Arabesco for voice and cello, 1975
- Coros tejiendo, voces alternando for 12 voices, 1975
- Miroir fugace for string orchestra, 1975
- Va-et-vient for soprano, flute, clarinet and electric organ, 1976
- Consort for three voices, two harps and strings, 1977
- Immobilis in mobili for three winds, three strings, two pianos and percussion, 1977
- Carrousel for ondes Martenot and vibraphone, 1978
- Vent d'est, ballet, 1979
- Motionless Move für three winds four strings, harp, keyboard, percussion, two synthesizers and electric guitar, 1980
- Pentagramme, ballet, 1980
- Rainbow, ballet, 1981
- Light and Shade for 11 musicians, 1981
- Ay, luna for mixed choir, 1981
- Brisé for guitar, 1982
- Vision for mezzo-soprano, piano, harp, electric guitar, cello and vibraphone, 1982
- Clos de vie for piano, harp, harpsichord, electric guitar, banjo, four strings and vibraphone, 1983
- Kotekan for mixed choir, 1983
- Rodolphe, ballet, 1983
- Duo staccato for violin and piano, 1984
- Rondo for lute ensemble, 1984
- Éléphant dans le noir for small orchestra, 1985
- Piano concertant for piano and orchestra, 1986
- Dans la nuit for harp, synthesizer, vibraphone and marimbaphone, 1986
- Merapi for two winds, three strings, harp and vibraphone, 1986
- Nocturn i Albada for guitar, 1986
- Dum esset rex for mixed choir, 1986
- O quam suavis est for mixed choir, 1987
- Ecos for organ, 1987
- La Porte, monodrama for soprano and percussion, 1987
- Monodas españolas for piano, 1988
- Monody Quartet for chamber ensemble, 1989
- O Bali for chamber ensemble, 1989
- Alice & friends, 1990
- Airs d'Espagne, 1992
- Violinissimo, Concerto for violin & orchestra, 1992
- Symphonie minute, 1994
- Alap & gat, 1998
- Exercices de conversation, opera, to a libretto by Eugène Ionesco, 2000
- Cancionero, 2001
- Concertino, 2001
- Manuscrit trouvé à Saragosse, opera, 2001
- Concerto con brio for strings, 2004
