= Ana Sokolovic =

Canadian composer

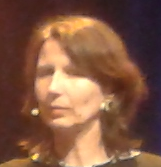
- in the Grand BAnQ Library 2018 by Bull-Doser
- Born: 1968 (age 57–58); Belgrade, Serbia
- Occupation: Music Composer

Ana Sokolovic (Serbian Cyrillic: Ана Соколовић; born 1968 in Belgrade) is a Canadian music composer based in Montreal, Quebec, whose contemporary pieces have won several awards in Canada. She is also the artistic director of the Quebec Contemporary Music Society.

== Career ==
These days, it's hard to find an opera composer whose theatrical instincts are daring and sure-footed at the same time. So let's be thankful that Ana Sokolovic chose Canada as her home.

— Colin Eatock, The Globe and Mail, June 26, 2011.

Sokolovic studied composition under Dušan Radić at the University of Novi Sad and Zoran Erić at the University of Arts in Belgrade. She received her master's in composition from the Université de Montréal studying under José Evangelista.

Sokolovic's repertoire is wide, covering theatrical, chamber, operatic, orchestral, and vocal genres.

The Société de musique contemporaine du Québec (SMCQ) dedicated the "Hommage Series" to Sokolovic for the 2011–2012 season, marking the twenty years since she immigrated to Quebec. Her body of work was celebrated in 200 events taking place across Canada.

Sokolovic's opera, Svadba-Wedding, focused on the day before a Serbian wedding and was produced by the Queen of Puddings Music Theater. The production toured Canada and Europe from 2012 until 2015, as well as returning in March 2018 for a performance at the Opera de Montreal.

In 2015, she became the first woman composer to create an operatic work for the Canadian Opera Company. The commission in question is regarding The Old Fools by renowned English poet Philip Larkin, a libretto written by British librettist Paul Bentley.

Her symphonic poem "Ringelspiel" was commissioned by Canada's National Arts Centre Orchestra and premiered in 2013. It has also been performed by the Montreal Symphony Orchestra in November 2017. Her music has also been performed at London's Royal Opera House and Montreal's Conservatory of Music.

In 2021 she composed the symphonic short film Iskra, for the National Arts Centre Orchestra and alto Ema Nikolovska, an exploration of the impact of technology on human society, in collaboration with the National Arts Centre/CBC Gem series Undisrupted.

In 2025 Sokolovic wrote the semi-final work for piano solo called Two Studies for Piano for the Queen Elisabeth Competition 2025 Piano.

== Awards ==
- SOCAN Foundation Award for Young Composers, 1995, 1996, 1997
- Grand prize and 1st prize in the Chamber Music category, CBC Young Composers Competition, 1999
- Joseph S. Stauffer Prize, Canada Council for the Arts, 2005
- Prix Opus for Composer of the Year, Conseil québécois de la musique, 2007
- Jan V. Matejcek Award, SOCAN, 2008, 2012
- National Arts Centre Award, 2009
- Dora Mavor Moore Award for Outstanding New Musical/Opera, 2012
- Juno Award for Classical Composition of the Year, 2019, for Golden Slumbers Kiss Your Eyes

Sokolovic is also a nominee for the Juno Awards of 2017 in the category Classical Composition of the Year. The nominated work is entitled "And I need a room to receive five thousand people with raised glasses... or... what a glorious day, the birds are singing 'halleluia'".

== Education ==
Born in Serbia, Sokolovic was a student of classical ballet prior to studying theater and music. She studied composition in Belgrade and later obtained a master's degree from Université de Montréal where she now teaches. Sokolovic immigrated to Quebec, Canada as a young adult.
