= Nancy Dahn =

Canadian musician

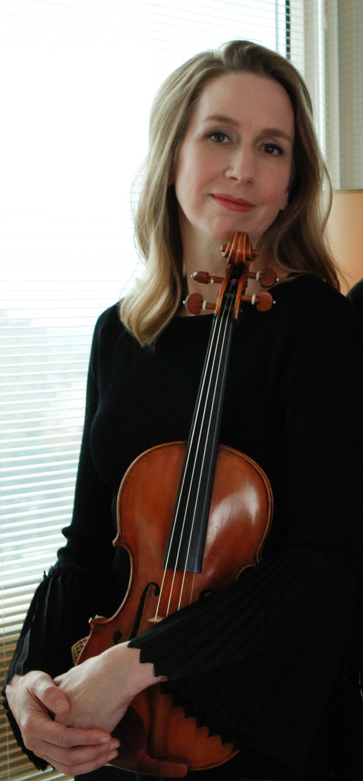
- Born: February 22, 1968 (age 58)
- Spouse: Timothy Steeves
- Children: 2

Academic background
- Education: B.Mus., New England Conservatory of Music; M.Mus., Juilliard School; D.M.A., Cleveland Institute of Music
- Doctoral advisor: Donald Weilerstein

Academic work
- Institutions: Cleveland Institute of Music; Memorial University of Newfoundland
- Website: duoconcertante.com

Nancy Dahn FRSC is a Canadian violinist. Alongside her husband, she co-founded the Tuckamore Festival in 2001 and is a University Research Professor of Violin and Viola at the Memorial University of Newfoundland.

== Education ==
Dahn studied at the New England Conservatory, the Juilliard School, and the Cleveland Institute of Music, where she earned her doctorate in violin performance.

== Career ==
Dahn taught violin and chamber music at the Cleveland Institute of Music. In 1995, she joined the faculty of Music at the Memorial University of Newfoundland. She was the University's first professor in strings. While there, she collaborated with her husband Timothy Steeves to create a musical duo named Duo Concertante. The name, which was inspired from Beethoven’s Kreutzer Sonata, was also the first piece the duo played in 1997.

By 2001, Dahn and her pianist husband Steeves launched the Tuckamore Festival together, which later earned the support of the Canadian government. That year, the duo received the 2001 Touring Performers Award from Contact East.

In 2010, Duo Concertante received the Artist of the Year Award from the Newfoundland and Labrador Arts Council. The next year, the duo commissioned and wrote R. Murray Schafer’s Duo for Violin and Piano, which won Best Classical Composition at the 2011 Juno Awards.

In 2016, Dahn and her husband were elected Fellows of the Royal Society of Canada. They were also promoted to University Research Professor, which the Memorial University of Newfoundland ranked above Full Professor. The next year, Duo Concertante received the 2017 East Coast Music Award (ECMA) for Classical Recording of the Year.
