= Stephen Chatman =

Canadian composer

Stephen Chatman CM (born 28 February 1950) is an American-born Canadian composer residing in Vancouver. His compositions have been performed across Canada and in the United States.

== Early life and education ==
Chatman was born in Faribault, Minnesota. He studied with Joseph R. Wood and Walter Aschaffenburg at the Oberlin Conservatory. At the University of Michigan in Ann Arbor, he studied with Ross Lee Finney, Leslie Bassett, William Bolcom, and Eugene Kurtz, completing a D.M.A. degree in 1977. A Fulbright grant enabled him to study with Karlheinz Stockhausen at the Hochschule für Musik in Cologne in 1974.

== Career ==
In 1976, Chatman joined the faculty of the University of British Columbia, in Vancouver. He composed a number of musical works in the 1980s, including the suite There Is Sweet Music There for chorus and oboe, and the choral work Due North.

Chatman became Head of the Composition Division of the UBC School of Music in 1977 and was promoted to Professor in 1987.

He was named a Member of the Order of Canada in July 2012. In 2010 his composition "Magnificat" was his third nomination for a Juno Award. He has received three BMI Awards to Student Composers and four Western Canadian Music Awards for Outstanding Composition.

In 2017, an album of Chatman's compositions, Dawn of Night, sung by the University of Toronto MacMillan Singers, was released by Centrediscs. His comic opera Choir Practice, created with Tara Wohlberg, was performed by the University of British Columbia Opera Ensemble.

== Notable students ==
Chatman's notable students include John Burge, Richard Covey, Arne Eigenfeldt, John Estacio, Melissa Hui, Jared Miller, Jocelyn Morlock, Jason Nett, Larry Nickel, John Oliver, and Rui Shi Zhuo.
