= Michael Oesterle =

German-born Canadian composer (born 1968)

Michael Oesterle (born 1968) is a German-born Canadian composer currently living in Deux-Montagnes, Quebec, Canada. His compositions have been performed by classical ensembles throughout Canada and internationally.

== Early life and education ==
Oesterle was born in Germany. He immigrated to Vancouver British Columbia as a teenager. He attended the University of British Columbia where he studied composition, and later earned a master's degree from Princeton University.

== Career ==
Oesterle has created a large variety of compositions. In 1997, with pianist Marc Couroux, he founded the Ensemble KORE in Montreal. He was commissioned by the Berlin Rundfunk Sinfonie Orchester to create music for the Berliner Musik Biennale 1999. He was composer-in-residence of the Orchestre Métropolitain du Grand Montréal from 2001 to 2004.

In 2014 Oesterle composed a symphony, New World. Its fourth movement, "Home", was performed by the Madison Symphony Orchestra in 2018. His work "Centennials" was included on the Gryphon Trio's 2015 album Elements Eternal.

His work "Entr’actes" was performed by the Victoria Symphony as part of its 2016 cross-Canada tour. That year Oesterle lectured at the Conservatoire in Birmingham, United Kingdom, where his work "California" was performed by the Thallein Ensemble.
