= Vincent Ho (composer) =

Vincent Ho is a Canadian composer. Both his Arctic Symphony and The Shaman: Concerto for Percussion & Orchestra were nominated for Juno Awards.

== Early life and education ==
Ho was born in Ottawa, Ontario, and grew up in Calgary, Alberta. He studied at The Royal Conservatory of Music, and later at the University of Calgary, graduating with a bachelor's degree in composition. He earned a Master of Music Degree (M.Mus.) from the University of Toronto, then later earned his Doctor of Musical Arts (DMA) in composition from the University of Southern California.

== Career ==
Ho joined the teaching staff of the University of Calgary. In 2004, his first orchestral work Dragon Realms was presented by the Winnipeg Symphony Orchestra during their annual New Music Festival. In 2006, his cello work Stigmata was awarded the Canadian Music Centre's Young Composer Award and featured at the same New Music Festival in Winnipeg that year (performed by cellist Caroline Stinson). In 2007 Ho was named composer-in-residence for the Winnipeg Symphony Orchestra, with duties which included organizing the festival.

Since 2011, Ho has had a strong collaborative relationship with percussionist Dame Evelyn Glennie that yielded several high-profile works, including:

- The Shaman: Concerto for Percussion and Orchestra - 2011; inspired by shamanic traditions
- Nostalgia (solo vibraphone or piano) - 2011
- From Darkness to Light: A Spiritual Journey (percussion and orchestra) - 2013; a work reflecting the experiences of people with cancer.
- Sandman's Castle (solo tam-tam) - 2015
- Kickin' It 2.0 (violin, cello, piano, and drum set) - 2017. This work was nominated for a Juno Award, for Classical Composition of the Year, in 2020.

In 2017 Ho brought together a group of Canadian composers to create True North: Symphonic Ballet, commissioned by the Calgary Philharmonic Orchestra to celebrate Canada's 150th birthday.

Ho composed Arctic Symphony, which was performed at the True North Festival in Calgary. The work was nominated for a Juno Award in 2019.
