= Dorothy Chang =

Dorothy Chang (born 1970) is an American-born composer and a professor of music at the University of British Columbia.

== Early life and education ==
Chang was born in Winfield, Illinois. Her parents' families had fled to Taiwan from China during the Chinese Civil War, before immigrating to the United States. She graduated from the University of Michigan and Indiana University Jacobs School of Music in 2000 with degrees in composition. She married Canadian flautist Paolo Bortolussi, and the pair moved to British Columbia.

== Career ==
In 2003, Chang joined the music faculty at the University of British Columbia.

Chang composed a number of works for solo flute, including "Mirage II" and "Wrath".

In 2007, Chang was the composer-in-residence of the Albany Symphony Orchestra. Her work "Strange Air" was performed at the Cabrillo Festival of Contemporary Music in 2008.

Chang was one of several Canadian composers commissioned by the Calgary Philharmonic Orchestra in 2017 to create the orchestra and dance piece True North: Symphonic Ballet, to celebrate Canada's 150th birthday. Chang composed the fourth movement, "Northern Star". The complete work was performed at Calgary's True North Festival, and "Northern Star" was later performed by the Toronto Symphony Orchestra and at the Orpheum in Vancouver.

Chang wrote the first concerto for the combination of piano, erhu, and orchestra ever written, Gateways, in 2017–18. The work was commissioned for PEP (Piano and Erhu Project) by the Henan-Canada Friendship Association, Philharmonia Northwest, and PEP. The world premiere of the chamber orchestra version of Gateways was given by PEP and members of the Vancouver Symphony Orchestra in Vancouver in April 2018; the world premiere of the full orchestral version of Gateways was given by PEP and Philharmonia Northwest in Seattle in March 2019.

== Selected compositions ==
- Streams
- Northern Star
- Strange Air
- Flight (concerto for flute and orchestra)
- Gateways (2017–18) - the first concerto for piano, erhu, and orchestra ever written
