= Pat Carrabré =

T. Patrick Carrabré
- Born: Thomas Patrick Carrabré; 1958 (age 67–68)
- Occupations: Composer, music instructor and radio personality

T. Patrick Carrabré is a Canadian composer, teacher, and radio personality based in Manitoba.

He is currently a professor of music at the University of British Columbia, where he serves as Director of the School of Music. Carrabré was formerly Dean of Music and Vice-President (Academic and Research) at Brandon University.

== Early life and education ==
Carrabré is of Métis heritage. Born during the Sixties Scoop, Carrabré was taken from his birth parents and subsequently adopted by a white family.

Carrabré studied music composition with Peter Paul Koprowski at The University of Western Ontario, where he received his Masters in Music degree. He went on to complete a PhD degree at The City University of New York.

== Career ==
After moving to Winnipeg, Carrabré was for many years a member of the Manitoba Composers Association. He began working with the Winnipeg Symphony Orchestra as associate composer in 1994. He was composer-in-residence at the WSO from 2001 to 2007.

In March 2007, Carrabré became the weekend host of The Signal, a new program on CBC Radio 2 devoted to contemporary music. The program was cancelled as part of a raft of English radio cuts in March 2009.

Carrabré has been a jury member of the Manitoba Arts Council. Drawing from this experience, he began lecturing students on effective grant writing in his Arts Administration course.

With his wife Mary Jo Carrabré and Naomi Forman, he recorded a five-song cycle Crazy; it was released by Winter Wind Records.

== Composition ==
Carrabré has fulfilled over 30 commissions, writing contemporary music for a variety of performing groups using the twelve-tone musical language. His compositions have won a number of nominations and awards.

Sonata No. 1 "The Penitent" for the violin and the piano (composed in 1990) was nominated for a Juno Award in the Best Classical Composition category. "The Dark Reaches", commissioned by the Gryphon Trio, also received a Juno nomination.

His first album, "Firebrand", showcases his chamber works and was released in 2008. "A hammer for your thoughts" mimics the imagery of hammered piano strings with its use of the glockenspiel. This quintet received the Western Canadian Music Award for Best Classical Composition.

"War of the Angels", nominee for the 2013 WCMA Classical Recording of the Year, is a collection of pieces commissioned by the WSO, including two symphonies. One of these, "Inuit Games", features Inuit throat singing and was a recommended work at the 2003 International Rostrum of Composers.
