= Juno Award for Vocal Jazz Album of the Year =

Canadian music award

The Juno Award for Vocal Jazz Album of the Year has been awarded since 2000, as recognition each year for the best vocal jazz album in Canada.

== Winners ==
=== Best Vocal Jazz Album (2000 – 2002) ===
Year	Winner(s)	Album	Nominees	Ref.
2000	Diana Krall	When I Look in Your Eyes	Jeri Brown, I've Got Your Number; Kate Hammett-Vaughan, How My Heart Sings; Karin Plato, There's Beauty in the Rain; Carol Welsman, Swing Ladies, Swing!	
2001	Joni Mitchell	Both Sides Now	Molly Johnson, Molly Johnson; Marc Jordan, This Is How Men Cry; Ranee Lee, Dark Divas; Denzal Sinclaire, I Found Love	
2002	Diana Krall	The Look of Love	Susie Arioli Swing Band, It's Wonderful; Emilie-Claire Barlow, Tribute; Jeri Brown, Image in the Mirror the Triptych; Melissa Walker, I Saw the Sky	

=== Vocal Jazz Album of the Year (2003 – present) ===
Year	Winner(s)	Album	Nominees	Ref.
2003	Diana Krall	Live in Paris	Coral Egan, the path of least resistance; Molly Johnson, Another Day; Susie Arioli Swing Band, Pennies from Heaven; Joani Taylor and Bob Murphy, The Wall Street Sessions	
2004	Holly Cole	Shade	Jeri Brown, Firm Roots; Ranee Lee, Maple Groove; Denzal Sinclaire, Denzal Sinclaire; Carol Welsman, The Language of Love	
2005	Diana Krall	The Girl in the Other Room	Susie Arioli Band feat. Jordan Officer, That's for Me; Kate Hammett-Vaughan Quintet, Eclipse; Marc Jordan, Make Believe Ballroom; Dione Taylor, Open Your Eyes	
2006	Diana Krall	Christmas Songs	Paul Anka, Rock Swings; Cadence, Twenty For One; Ranee Lee, Just You, Just Me; Sophie Milman, Sophie Milman	
2007	Diana Krall	From This Moment On	Lori Cullen, Calling for Rain; Kellylee Evans, Fight or Flight?; Molly Johnson, Messin' Around; Elizabeth Shepherd, Start to Move	
2008	Sophie Milman	Make Someone Happy	Emilie-Claire Barlow, The Very Thought of You; Holly Cole, Holly Cole; Deborah Cox, Destination Moon; Michael Kaeshammer, Days Like These	
2009	Molly Johnson	Lucky	Diana Panton, If the Moon Turns Green...; Elizabeth Shepherd (musician), Parkdale; Yvette Tollar, Ima; Nikki Yanofsky, Ella...Of Thee I Swing	
2010	Ranee Lee	Ranee Lee Lives Upstairs	Emilie-Claire Barlow, Haven't We Met?; Michael Kaeshammer, Lovelight; Diana Krall, Quiet Nights; Carol Welsman, I Like Men	
2011	Kellylee Evans	Nina	Emilie-Claire Barlow, The Beat Goes On; Laila Biali, Tracing Light; Jeff Healey, Last Call; Nikki Yanofsky, Nikki	
2012	Sonia Johnson	Le Carré de nos amours	Fern Lindzon, Two Kites; Sophie Milman, In the Moonlight; The Nylons, Skin Tight; Diana Panton, To Brazil with Love	
2013	Emilie-Claire Barlow	Seule ce soir	Diana Krall, Glad Rag Doll; Diana Panton, Christmas Kiss; Elizabeth Shepherd, Rewind; Carol Welsman, Journey	
2014	Mike Rud ft. Sienna Dahlen	Notes on Montréal	Matt Dusk, My Funny Valentine: The Chet Baker Songbook; Sonia Johnson, Charles Biddle Jr. and Annie Poulain, Triades; Amy McConnell and William Sperandei, Stealing Genius; Erin Propp with Larry Roy, Courage, My Love	
2015	Diana Panton	Red	Julie Crochetière, Counting Dreams; Angela Galuppo, Angela Galuppo; Molly Johnson, Because of Billie; Elizabeth Shepherd, The Signal	
2016	Emilie-Claire Barlow	Clear Day	Dan Brubeck Quartet, Live from the Cellar; Jaclyn Guillou, This Bitter Earth; Tara Kannangara, Some Version of the Truth; Alex Pangman, New	
2017	Bria Skonberg	Bria	Heather Bambrick, You'll Never Know; Matt Dusk and Florence K, Quiet Nights; Barbra Lica, I'm Still Learning; Amanda Tosoff, Words	
2018	Diana Krall	Turn Up the Quiet	Matt Dusk, Old School Yule; Kellylee Evans, Come On; Michael Kaeshammer, No Filter; Bria Skonberg, With a Twist	
2019	Laila Biali	Laila Biali	Holly Cole, Holly; Diana Krall and Tony Bennett, Love Is Here to Stay; Diana Panton, Solstice/Equinox; Jodi Proznick and Laila Biali, Sun Songs	
2020	Dominique Fils-Aimé	Stay Tuned!	Jazz Affair, Wishes; Monkey House, Friday; Elizabeth Shepherd, Montreal; Bria Skonberg, Nothing Never Happens	
2021	Sammy Jackson	With You	Laila Biali, Out of Dust; Sophie Day, Clémence; Matt Dusk, Sinatra; Diana Krall, This Dream of You	
2022	Caity Gyorgy	Now Pronouncing: Caity Gyorgy	Alex Bird and the Jazz Mavericks, You Are the Light and the Way; Holly Cole Trio, Montreal (Live); Elizabeth Shepherd and Michael Occhipinti, The Weight of Hope; Amanda Tosoff, Earth Voices	
2023	Caity Gyorgy	Featuring	Laura Anglade and Sam Kirmayer, Venez donc chez moi; The Ostara Project, The Ostara Project; Diana Panton, Blue; Nikki Yanofsky, Nikki by Starlight	
2024	Dominique Fils-Aimé	Our Roots Run Deep	Denielle Bassels, Little Bit a' Love; Laila Biali, Your Requests; Alex Bird and Ewen Farncombe, Songwriter; Caity Gyorgy and Mark Limacher, You're Alike, You Two	
2025	Caity Gyorgy	Hello! How Are You?	Laila Biali, Wintersongs; Kellylee Evans, Winter Song; Sarah Jerrom, Magpie; Andrea Superstein, Oh Mother	
2026	Laura Anglade	Get Out of Town	Atlantic Jazz Collective, Seascape feat. Norma Winstone & Joe LaBarbera; Caity Gyorgy and Mark Limacher, Caity Gyorgy with Strings; Ale Nuñez, Under the Lemon Tree; Alex Samaras, Alex Samaras Meets Judy Garland	
