= Canadian Festival of Spoken Word =

The Canadian Festival of Spoken Word is an annual festival produced by Spoken Word Canada and planned by a local Festival Organizing Committee in each host city.

The inaugural festival took place in Ottawa, Ontario, in 2004 and was then known as the Canadian Spoken Wordlympics. CFSW has since become the flagship event for poetry slam in Canada, and is evolving to better represent the full spectrum of spoken word nationally.

== Festival history ==
The Canadian Spoken Wordlympics as an organization was created in 2003 by Darek Dawda, Anthony Bansfield, RC Weslowski, and Dwayne Morgan, who received support from the Canada Council for the Arts to organize a national showcase of spoken word talent in Canada. They saw the success of the National Poetry Slam in the United States and envisioned a similar poetry slam event for Canada drawing national and international attention. The founders of the festival decided the first event should be held in Ottawa in fall 2004. An organizing team was pulled together and another large successful application was made to the Canada Council for the Arts for financial support for the four-day event.

=== 2004 Canadian Spoken Wordlympics – Ottawa ===
The inaugural festival, led by Darek Dawda and Oni Joseph, was held at the National Library and Archives in October 2004, and featured several poetry slams held in the evenings, with showcase events and open mics in the afternoons. Several poets from international locations such as France, the U.S., Germany, and the United Kingdom also participated in various facets of the festival. Showcases for women, Aboriginal peoples, urban poets, queer poets and youth were held, and there was a guerrilla reading on the front lawn of the Parliament buildings.At this occasion the French speaking spoken Wordlympics was won by the French Poet Pilote le Hot who is organisating a world cup of poetry every year in Paris since then.

The festival also honoured the poetic contributions of acclaimed African-Canadian poet and playwright George Elliott Clarke.

Slam teams representing Toronto, Ottawa, Vancouver, Halifax and Winnipeg participated in the first team championship competition, with the Vancouver 1 team of Shane Koyczan, C.R. Avery, Barbara Adler and Brendan McLeod emerging victorious. Brendan McLeod and Drek Daa tied for the title of the individual slam competition champion, thereby becoming to date the only persons ever crowned Canadian Individual Slam Champions.

At a meeting of city representatives held during the Wordlympics, Vancouver was selected as the site for the 2005 festival. However, the event was renamed the Canadian Festival of Spoken Word in its second year because of concerns about copyright conflict with the 2010 Winter Olympic Games.

| Winner | Vancouver 1 (Shane Koyczan, C.R. Avery, Barbara Adler and Brendan McLeod) |
| Artists of Honour | George Elliott Clarke |

=== CFSW 2005 Vancouver ===
The 2005 festival organizing committee, led by Randy Jacobs / RC Weslowski, took the opportunity to broaden the focus of the event. Open mic events for the evening shows started with a live band jamming with poets reciting improv-style on stage, and feature performers were brought into the evening events. Showcases were held in the afternoons for queer poets, African-Canadian poets, youth and others, while Aboriginal poets, sound poets, storytellers and others performed in the evening slots. The 2005 festival also continued the tradition set the year before of featuring international poets with a contingent from the U.K. doing performances as well. Rob Gee, Steve Larkin, Kat Francois, TUGGStarr and AF Harrold all participated. The cities of Toronto, Ottawa, Vancouver, Victoria, Winnipeg and two Vancouver teams competed in the slam competition. Vancouver 2 featuring Patrick Swan, Magpie Ulysses, T.L. Groves, and Kim Shaughnessy, took the finals win, retaining the championship for the home city for the second year in a row.

The "poet of honour" award was also introduced in Vancouver. Dwayne Morgan, Canadian Urban Music Award-winning poet, and Sheri-D Wilson, director of the Calgary International Spoken Word Festival, were the first Poets of Honour. They were invited to perform feature sets during the festival.

| Winner | Vancouver 2 (Patrick Swan, Magpie Ulysses, T.L. Groves, and Kim Shaughnessy) |
| Artists of Honour | Sheri-D Wilson & Dwayne Morgan |

=== CFSW 2006 Toronto ===
The third annual festival took place in Toronto. The festival organizing committee, led by Dwayne Morgan and David Silverberg, took the event one step further by introducing a conference component to the festival. Workshops on recording spoken word CDs, touring, applying for grants and creating team pieces were woven into the afternoon events, along with showcases featuring dub poetry, African-Canadian poetry, queer poets, nerd poets and youth.

The Poets of Honour were Lillian Allen, Juno award-winning dub poet, and Shane Koyczan, the first non-American to win the U.S. National Poetry Slam.

Eight cities entered teams into the slam competition – Toronto, Ottawa, Vancouver, Winnipeg, Halifax, Calgary, Montreal and Windsor – though Windsor and Montreal ended up withdrawing from the competition. The slam went ahead with seven teams when a second Toronto team was added at the last minute. The hastily assembled Toronto 2 team performed extremely well, narrowly losing in the team finals to team Vancouver featuring RC Weslowski, Patrick Swan, Nora Smithhisler and Magpie Ulysses. This enabled the defending champions to win the title for the third consecutive year.

The 2006 Spoken Word Canada annual board meeting in Toronto set CFSW on new course by bestowing the right to host the 2007 festival on Halifax and inviting Calgary to be the host city in 2008. For future years, Spoken Word Canada decided to award the festival to host cities two years in advance.

| Winner | Vancouver (RC Weslowski, Patrick Swan, Nora Smithhisler and Magpie Ulysses) |
| Artists of Honour | Lillian Allen & Shayne Koyczan |

=== CFSW 2007 Halifax ===
The 2007 festival was hosted by the Word Iz Bond Spoken Word Artists' Collective in Halifax. The festival organizing committee, led by Shauntay Grant, incorporated other artistic forms into the festival. Beginning with a showcase called "Halifax in Poetry", the festival showcased poets working with musicians during their performances. There was also a showcase involving youth workshopping their poetry with the assistance of professional jazz artists, and an innovative Poetry Challenge combining spoken word artists, musicians and visual art on display at the Art Gallery of Nova Scotia. The festival also included open mic sessions, panel discussions and guerrilla poetry readings on the streets of Halifax.

On finals night the festival honoured Darek Dawda, one of the festival's founders, and the late Rita Joe, a noted Nova Scotia based Mi'kmaq-Canadian poet and songwriter.

Seven cities were represented in the team slam competition—Vancouver, Victoria, Calgary, Winnipeg, Ottawa, Halifax and Toronto (with two teams). After a highly competitive preliminary round and an energized final competition, the home team from Halifax broke Vancouver's winning streak to become the second city to capture the Canadian team championship in the history of CFSW.

The Spoken Word Canada Board of Directors selected Victoria as the 2009 host city at its annual meeting.

| Winner | Halifax |
| Artists of Honour | Darek Dawda & Rita Joe |

=== CFSW 2008 Calgary ===
The 2008 festival was hosted by Sheri-D Wilson, the 2005 Poet of Honour and the main organizer of the Calgary International Spoken Word Festival. The model for the festival was now firmly established and the Calgary festival organizing committee maintained it—showcases, guerrilla poetry, professional development workshops and the national slam championship were all facets of the fifth festival event.

Twelve teams from across Canada participated in the national slam, including teams from Victoria, Vancouver, Calgary, Ottawa, Toronto, Halifax, and Montreal and the first ever "last chance" team made up of 4 poets chosen by finishing 1st-4th in the inaugural CFSW Last Chance Slam. Poets from a Southern Ontario team (representing Peterborough, London and Guelph) and the first ever rural team from Lanark County, Ontario also competed in the national slam championships.

The Poets of Honour were D. Kimm, noted Quebec-based performance artist and artistic director of Festival Voix d'Amériques in Montreal, and RC Weslowski, Vancouver's legendary poetry organizer and performer.

Shortly after the festival concluded, the 2010 festival was awarded to Montreal by electronic vote of the Spoken Word Canada Board of Directors.

In a tense and closely contested final slam, Halifax became the second city in the history of CFSW to repeat as champions, narrowly defeating Toronto's Up From the Roots team.

| Winner | Halifax (Shauntay Grant, iZrEAL, El Jones, Andrew Abraham) |
| Artists of Honour | D.Kimm & RC Weslowski |

=== CFSW 2009 Victoria ===
The festival returned to the west coast in 2009 and was hosted by the Tongues of Fire poetry collective. The festival organizing committee was directed by former Victoria Slam Team member Steven J. Thompson. The festival in Victoria saw a then-record eleven communities represented in the national slam: Victoria, Vancouver, Calgary, Ottawa, Toronto, Halifax, Montreal, Lanark County, London, Saskatoon and Winnipeg. Storm poets were given an opportunity to enter the competition through a Last Chance Slam on the first night of the festival. There were a total of twelve teams in the competition.

Daytime events included workshops, showcase performances by team alternates, themed showcases for Aboriginal, women, queer and Pan-African poets and open mic sessions. There were also late night events after the slams with music, friendly competitions and erotica.

The Poets of Honour were Andrea Thompson, member of the first-ever Canadian slam team to compete at the U.S. National Poetry Slam, and C.R. Avery, member of the first Canadian Slam Champion team from the 2004 Wordlympics.

At finals night, Montreal, Vancouver and the Wildcard Team known as the Slaughterhouse Four were unable to prevent The Recipe (Ottawa) from claiming the championship for the first time.

After Montreal pulled out of hosting the 2010 festival, the Spoken Word Canada Board of Directors confirmed Ottawa as the replacement host at its annual meeting, and deferred awarding the 2011 festival to a later date by electronic vote.

| Winner | The Recipe/Ottawa (Emcee E, OpenSecret, Poetic Speed, Brandon Wint and Rusty Priske) |
| Artists of Honour | Andrea Thompson & C.R. Avery |

=== CFSW 2010 Ottawa ===
CFSW returned in 2010 to the city where it began. The organizing committee, formed largely from members of the Capital Poetry Collective, was led by festival director Nathanaël Larochette. Two new records were set in Ottawa - most communities represented in the slam (15) and largest number of slam teams in the national finals (18). Victoria, Vancouver, Calgary, Ottawa (2 teams), Toronto (2 teams), Halifax, Montreal, Lanark County, London, Saskatoon and Winnipeg returned, while Edmonton, Guelph, Burlington and Peterborough sent slam teams to the competition for the first time. There was also a Last Chance Slam on the first day of the festival to select a Wild Card Team composed of five storm poets.

Daytime events included workshops, showcase performances by team alternates, themed showcases for francophone artists, youth, nerd poetry and poetry/music fusion, as well as themed open mic sessions at the end of each showcase. There were also late night events after the slams with music and an erotica poetry open mic.

The Poets of Honour were Anthony Bansfield, one of the festival's co-founders, and Shauntay Grant, CFSW 2007 Halifax festival director and a member of the 2008 national champion slam team.

At finals night, Burlington, Montreal, Ottawa Capital Slam and Ottawa Urban Legends competed for the championship. After starting off behind Urban Legends, Ottawa Capital Slam, captained by Chris Tse, overtook their sister team from the capital city in the second half of the bout to claim their second championship in a row.

Toronto was confirmed as the 2011 host in advance of the annual Spoken Word Canada Board of Directors meeting held during the festival. At the same meeting, Saskatoon was confirmed as the 2012 host city and the community of Kitchener-Waterloo was added to the Board, making them eligible to send a team to the 2011 festival.

| Winner | Capital Slam/Ottawa (Prufrock Shadowrunner, Chris Tse, John Akpata, OpenSecret, and Brandon Wint) |
| Artists of Honour | Anthony Bansfield & Shauntay Grant |

=== CFSW 2011 Toronto ===
| Winner | (1) Edmonton (Mary Pinkoski, Knowmadic, Colin Matty, Liam Coady and Chris Krueger) | (2) Toronto - UFTR (3) Ottawa - Urban Legends (4) Kingston |
| Artists of Honour | Robert Priest & d'bi young | |

The eighth annual Canadian Festival of Spoken Word took place in Toronto, Ontario from October 11 to 15, 2011 under the leadership of CFSW 2011 Toronto festival director David Silverberg of the Toronto Poetry Project.

=== CFSW 2012 Saskatoon ===
| Winner | Up From The Roots/Toronto (Dwayne Morgan, Lishai Peel, Greg 'Ritalin' Frankson, Patrick DeBelen, and Serafina) |
| Artists of Honour | Magpie Ulysses & Brendon McLeod |

The festival organizing committee for CFSW 2012 Saskatoon was led by Charles Hamilton, executive director of the Tonight It's Poetry weekly poetry series.

=== CFSW 2013 Montreal ===
| Winner | Toronto Poetry Slam Team (TPS) (Philosofly, Optimus Rhyme, IF, Kliggy and David Delisca) |
| Artists of Honour | José Acquelin and Tanya Evanson |

The tenth annual Canadian Festival of Spoken Word took place in Montreal, Québec, from November 4 to 9, 2013. This was Montreal's first opportunity to host the CFSW. It was also the first officially bilingual festival in which poets were requested to have at least one poem translated into French to promote the guiding theme of language diversity. Translations were provided courtesy of members of the Literary Translators Association. From the beginning of the festival Indigenous languages and cultures were also cited as an inspiration and a source for oral literature.

=== CFSW 2014 Victoria ===
| Winner | Toronto Poetry Slam (TPS) (Yes, Sabrina Benaim, PrufRock Shadowrunner, Matt. Miller, Andre Prefontaine) |
| Artists of Honour | Moe Clark & Ikenna "OpenSecret" Onyegbula |

=== CFSW 2015 Saskatoon ===
| Winner | Saskatoon (Hurt Feelings) (Brent Chappell, Danielle Altrogge, Larissa Tarasoff, Shanda Stefanson, Deej Siminoff) |
| Artists of Honour | El Jones & Joseph Naytowhow |

=== CFSW 2016 Winnipeg ===
| Winner | Guelph Poetry Slam - Bassam, Eitan Gallant, Elise Gordezky, Erin Aspenlieder, and Fannon Holland (Coach: Truth Is Ellipsis) |
| Artists of Honour | Jillian Christmas & Ian Keteku |

=== CFSW 2017 Peterborough ===
| Winner | Toronto Poetry Slam (Luke Reese, Ayla Lefkowitz, SPIN El Poeta, Jennifer Alicia) Coach: Andre Prefontaine |
| Artists of Honour | Rabbit Richards, Charlie Petch, Mitcholos (Rising Voice) |

=== CFSW 2018 Guelph ===
| Winner | Toronto Poetry Slam (Amoya Reé, Gavin Russell, Jennifer Alicia, Cassandra Myers, Gabrielle) | (2) Hamilton You Poets (3) VanSlam (4) Rattle The Cage |
| Artists of Honour | Shayne avec i grec & Truth Is ... | |

=== CFSW 2019 Guelph ===
| Winner | Up From The Roots (2019): Desiree Mckenzie, Dwayne Morgan, Joshua 'Scribe' Watkis, Mehul Edward '3 AM' Martin, Shelly Grace - Coach: Dwayne Morgan |
| Artists of Honour | Patrick de Belen, Mahlika Aweri |

== See also ==
- Spoken Word Canada
- Calgary International Spoken Word Festival
- Festival Voix d'Amériques
