= Festival Voix d'Amériques =

Festival Voix d’Amériques (FVA) was an annual festival in Montreal that was held from 2002 to 2011, which was dedicated to oral literature, text performance and spoken word. It was presented by Les Filles électriques.

Held in early February, the FVA brought together some one hundred French- and English-language artists, shifting from La Sala Rossa (4848 St-Laurent) to the Casa del Popolo (4873 St-Laurent) and back again.

In 2004, the Conseil des Arts de Montréal recognized the merit and vitality of the FVA by making it a finalist for its 20th Grand Prix, in the literature section.

== 2005 Artists ==
In 2005, the artists included:

- Chloé Sainte-Marie
- Tony Tremblay
- Les Abdigradationnistes
- Susie Arioli & Jordan Officer
- Charles Guilbert
- Pol Pelletier
- Lin Snelling
- Loco Locass
- Jacques Bertrand
- Patrice Desbiens
- Michel Garneau
- Stanley Péan
- Hélène Pedneault
- François Patenaude (des Zapartistes)
- ATSA
- Renée Robitaille
- Ève Lamont
- Lillian Allen (Toronto)
- Motion in Poetry (Toronto)
- Sheri-D Wilson (Calgary)
- Kaie Kellough
- Norman Nawrocki
- Ginette
- Ève Cournoyer
- Karen Young
- Thomas Hellman
- Fanfare Pourpour
- Bernard Falaise

== See also ==
- Canadian Festival of Spoken Word
