= People Will Say We're in Love =

1943 musical theatre song

Song
- Published: 1943
- Songwriter: Oscar Hammerstein II
- Composer: Richard Rodgers

"People Will Say We're in Love" is a show tune from the Rodgers and Hammerstein musical, Oklahoma! (1943). In the original Broadway production, the song was introduced by Alfred Drake and Joan Roberts.

== Plot context ==
The other characters think, correctly, that Laurey (Joan Roberts) and Curly (Alfred Drake) are in love. In this song they warn each other not to behave indiscreetly, lest people misinterpret their intentions. Neither wants to admit to the other his or her true feelings. Towards the end of the musical the characters reprise the number after becoming engaged, saying "Let people say we're in love." and also the whole ensemble in the curtain epilogue.

== Covers ==
This song has been covered by many people, including instrumental versions. Three versions made the Top 40 charts: Bing Crosby & Trudy Erwin (#2), Frank Sinatra (#3), and The Ink Spots (#11). The list of covers includes:

- 101 Strings Orchestra
- The Cannonball Adderley Quintet
- Thomas Allen & Valerie Masterson
- Eric Alexander
- Chet Baker & Gerry Mulligan
- Chris Bennett
- Emmett Berry
- Les Brown and His Band of Renown
- Kenny Burrell
- Donald Byrd & Doug Watkins
- Carmen Cavallaro
- Eugene Chadbourne
- Ray Charles & Betty Carter
- Rosemary Clooney
- Nat King Cole
- George Coleman
- Dorothy Collins
- Perry Como
- Ray Conniff
- Bing Crosby & Trudy Erwin - recorded August 23, 1943.
- Helen Forrest
- Sergio Franchi - The Songs of Richard Rodgers (1965)
- Erroll Garner
- Tom Grant
- Bennie Green
- Dick Haymes
- Ted Heath
- Fred Hersch
- Lena Horne & Lennie Hayton
- Leslie Hutchinson
- The Ink Spots
- Joni James
- Jack Jones
- Spike Jones and his City Slickers
- Roger Kellaway
- Stacey Kent - The Boy Next Door (2008)
- Lee Konitz
- James Last
- Peggy Lee
- Marcia Lewis
- Monica Lewis
- Joe Loss Orchestra. Recorded in London on August 19, 1947. Released by EMI on the His Master's Voice label as catalogue number BD 5974
- Gordon Macrae and Shirley Jones (film version)
- Helen Merrill
- Glenn Miller & The Army Air Force Band
- Sophie Milman - Make Someone Happy (2007)
- Marion Montgomery
- Gerry Mulligan
- Rita Reys
- Nelson Riddle
- Spike Robinson
- Mathilde Santing & Rita Reys
- Frank Sinatra - The Best Of The Columbia Years 1943 - 1952
- Johnny Smith
- Kate Smith
- David Soul & Claire Moore
- The Spaniels
- Sonny Stitt & Hank Jones
- Dick Sudhalter
- Tierney Sutton
- The Treniers
- Lawrence Welk

== Adaptation ==
In 1959 the British composer Peter Dickinson used part of the music in his Monologue for String Orchestra, principally the melodic line under the lyric "People will say we're in...".
