= Tollar =

Tollar is a surname. Notable people with the surname include:

- Jon Moncayola Tollar (born 1998), Spanish football midfielder
- Maryem Tollar (born 1968), Canadian singer
- Yvette Tollar, Canadian singer
