= Chris Tse =

Chris Tse may refer to:

- Chris Tse (New Zealand writer) (born 1982), New Zealand poet, short story writer and editor
- Chris Tse (Canadian poet) (born 1989), Canadian spoken-word poet, motivational speaker, and hip hop artist
