= Caity Gyorgy =

Canadian jazz singer

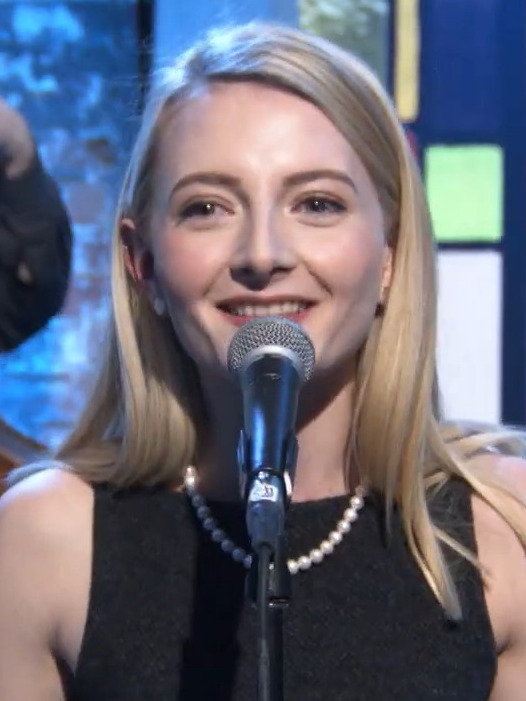
- Gyorgy in 2019

Background information
- Born: May 25, 1998 (age 27); Calgary, Alberta, Canada
- Genres: Jazz
- Occupation: Singer
- Years active: 2019–present
- Label: La Reserve
- Website: www.caitygyorgy.com

Caity Gyorgy is a Canadian jazz singer from Calgary, Alberta. She received the Juno Award for Vocal Jazz Album of the Year in 2022 for her EP, Now Pronouncing: Caity Gyorgy, in 2023 for her debut LP, Featuring, and in 2025 for her LP, Hello! How are you?.

Gyorgy was born in Calgary, Alberta. Her paternal grandfather's family had come over in the 1930s from Hungary. In 2022, Gyorgy received her Masters of Music in jazz performance from McGill University under the tutelage of Christine Jensen.

She is a graduate of the music program at Humber College and received her Masters of Music in jazz performance at McGill University. She released both her debut album No Bounds and the EP Now Pronouncing in 2021.

Gyorgy has performed at the Toronto Jazz Festival and the Calgary Jazz Festival. She has also performed alongside artists such as Allison Au, Jocelyn Gould, and Pat LaBarbera.

== Discography ==
=== Albums ===
- No Bounds (Caity Gyorgy Records, 2021)
- Featuring (La Reserve, 2022)
- You're Alike, You Two (La Reserve, 2023)
- Hello! How are you? (La Reserve, 2024)
- Caity Gyorgy with Strings: Arranged and Conducted by Mark Limacher (La Reserve, 2025)

=== EPs ===
- Caity Gyorgy Quartet (Caity Gyorgy Records, 2019)
- Now Pronouncing: Caity Gyorgy (La Reserve, 2021)

=== Appearances ===
- Dogs of Orion with Benjamin Sigerson, Honoka Shoji, and Raphael Agustin (Marvin Records, 2022)
- A Day Too Late with Marshal Herridge (self-published, 2022)
- Strange Harbors with Matt Block and Morton Block (La Reserve Records, 2022)
- Autumn with Philip Labes (self-published, 2022)
- Pennies From Heaven with Laila Biali (self-published, 2023)
- Your Requests with Laila Biali (self-published, 2023)
- The Fourth Tuning with Scott Bradlee's Postmodern Jukebox (mudhutdigital.com, 2023)
- East of the Sun with Anthony D'Alessandro and Benny Benack III (self-published, 2024)
- Close to You with Tomás Jonsson (Tertiary Stream Music, 2024)
- I Feel Pretty with Olivia Van Goor (self-published, 2024)
- Searchin' with Anthony D'Alessandro and Benny Benack III (self-published, 2024)
- Living Room Petit with Martina DaSilva (La Reserve, 2024)
- Canada Sessions Vol. 2: Still Cookin' at 90 with Al Muirhead (Chronograph Records, 2025)
