= Dwayne Morgan (poet) =

Canadian musician and poet

- Born: October 15, 1974 (age 52); Toronto, Ontario
- Education: Dr Norman Bethune Collegiate InstituteMacklin Public School
- Occupations: Spoken word artist, motivational speaker
- Years active: 1993 - present
- Political party: New Democratic Party

Dwayne Morgan OOnt is a Canadian spoken word artist, motivational speaker and event organizer based in Toronto, Ontario.

Morgan began his career as a spoken word artist in 1993. He is the founder of Up From The Roots Entertainment, which was established in 1994 to promote the positive artistic contributions of African Canadian and urban influenced artists. He received both the African Canadian Achievement Award for Youth Achievement, and the Harry Jerome Award for Excellence in the Arts in 1998. Morgan has self-published two chapbooks and three full volumes of his poetry.

As a producer, Morgan has now produced over 100 events, the largest of which are the annual spoken word concerts When Brothers Speak, When Sisters Speak, and the Toronto International Poetry Slam. When Brothers Speak was established in 1999. When Sisters Speak, founded in 2000 is North America’s largest and longest-running showcase of Black, female, spoken word artists.

Morgan collaborated with Driftwood Studios to film Three Knocks, a ten-minute film based on his domestic violence poem of the same name, which premiered at the 2006 Reel World Film Festival in Toronto.

He was a member of the 2007 Toronto Slam Team formed by Up From The Roots. The team finished second at the 2007 Canadian Festival of Spoken Word in Halifax, Nova Scotia.

Morgan was the host of Diasporic Music, a monthly spoken word show on CKLN-FM, and is an advice columnist in the free daily paper, 24 Hours, in Toronto. He is also a Toronto regional representative on the board of directors for Spoken Word Canada, and is an active member of the Spoken Word Arts Network (SWAN).

Morgan was inducted into the Scarborough Hall of Fame in 2013.

Morgan was nominated as the candidate of the New Democratic Party in Scarborough North for the 2018 Ontario general election. He placed second, to the incumbent Progressive Conservative candidate, Raymond Cho.

In January 2024, he was appointed to the Order of Ontario.

== Electoral history ==
2018 Ontario general election: Scarborough North
Party	Candidate	Votes	%	±%
Progressive Conservative	Raymond Cho	17,413	51.05	+19.87
New Democratic	Dwayne Morgan	8,320	24.39	–1.75
Liberal	Chin Lee	7,519	22.04	–18.03
Green	Nicole Peltier	543	1.59	–0.01
Libertarian	Sean Morgan	318	0.93	N/A
Total valid votes		34,113	100.0	
Progressive Conservative notional gain from Liberal		Swing		+10.81
Source: Elections Ontario

== Bibliography ==
=== Poetry books ===
- Long Overdue - one of the most popular that includes must read poems.
- The Man Behind the Mic
- The Making of A Man

=== Chapbooks ===
- Straight From The Roots
- The Revolution Starts Within

== Awards ==
- African Canadian Achievement Award for Youth Achievement, 1998
- Harry Jerome Award for Excellence in the Arts, 1998
- The Evolution, Canadian Urban Music Award for Best Spoken Word Recording, 2001
- Soul Searching, Canadian Urban Music Award for Best Spoken Word Recording, 2003
- "Mother I Understand" from A Decade in the Making, Canadian Urban Music Award for Best Spoken Word Recording, 2005
- Sheri-D Wilson Golden Beret Award for Career Achievement in the Spoken Word, 2018
- Scarborough Walk of Fame Inductee, 2013

== See also ==
- Slam poetry
