= Charlie Petch =

Canadian writer and performer

Charlie Petch is a non-binary Canadian writer and performer from Toronto, Ontario, whose poetry collection Why I Was Late was the winner of the ReLit Award for Poetry in 2022.

== Work ==
Principally a poet of spoken word, Petch was the founder of Hot Damn It's a Queer Slam and was Spoken Word Canada's poet of honour in 2017. They have also written and performed a number of theatrical plays, most notably Mel Malarkey Gets the Bum's Rush.

Why I Was Late is a 2021 poetry and biography collection by Petch that explores themes of queer love, loss, and survival. The book is a look at masculinity from the perspective of a transmasculine, disabled person who loves music, theater, and Star Wars. It won the 2022 ReLit Award for Poetry.

== Awards ==
=== Honors ===
- 2017 Spoken Word Canada's poet of honour

=== Literary ===
Year	Title	Award	Category	Result	Ref
2022	Why I Was Late	ReLit Award	Poetry	Won	

== Bibliogr ==
=== Poetry collection ===
- Why I Was Late (2021)
