= In the Moonlight =

Studio album by Sophie Milman
- Released: September 27, 2011
- Studios: Sear Sound, New York City, New York
- Genres: Vocal, jazz
- Length: 57:12
- Label: Entertainment One
- Producer: Matt Pearson

In the Moonlight is a studio album by jazz singer Sophie Milman, produced by Grammy-nominated producer Matt Pearson, who worked with singers such as Jane Monheit, and arranged by Alan Broadbent, Gerald Clayton, Gil Goldstein, Julian Lage, Kevin Hays, and Rob Mounsey. It was recorded at Sear Sound, a recording studio in New York City and released on the Entertainment One music label on September 27, 2011. The album was awarded a Juno award, earning Milman her sixth Juno award in her career. The album reached number one on the Billboard Jazz Albums chart.

== Reception ==
A review by Jon O'Brien for AllMusic stated that "the orchestration blends well with Milman's cabaret-style vocals, with a handful of musicians recruited for certain pieces and not used altogether for the accompaniment to a certain song. The low-key candlelight vibes of some songs are mixed in with more upbeat, bossa nova or pop style songs". O'Brien also praised Milman's song style, changing the style of some songs to better fit her vocals (ex. performing a swing-jazz rendition of Jon Hendricks' "No More Blues" or a bossa nova rendition of Billie Holidays' "Speak Low"). A review by Christopher Loudon on the website jazztimes.com praised Milman's vocal quality which add an extra layer to the songs she sings, providing "a sensual, warmer tone like that of ripe fruit". Loudon also praised the variety of moods portrayed by each song thanks in part to the clever arrangement by Alan Broadbent and his buddies. A review on the webpage thewholenote.com also praised Milman's vocals and the orchestral arrangements, calling the album "a trip through the Great American Songbook with a detour by way of Feist". A review by a user on visualgui.com also praised Milman's singing and the orchestral arrangements which blended nicely together and called the album "a perfect accompaniment for the cool autumn season". Other reviews also found Milman's vocals a perfect match for the orchestration accompaniment.

== Track listing ==
	Title	Length
1	"Do It Again" (Buddy G. DeSylva, George Gershwin)	3:48
2	"Oh, Look At Me Now" (Joe Bushkin, John De Vries)	3:26
3	"Moonlight" (John Williams, Alan Bergman, Marilyn Bergman)	5:29
4	"Speak Low" (Kurt Weill, Ogden Nash)	4:26
5	"Till There Was You" (Meredith Willson)	4:01
6	"Watch What Happens" (Michel Legrand, Norman Gimbel)	4:41
7	"Prelude To A Kiss" (Duke Ellington)	4:35
8	"Ces Petits Riens" (Serge Gainsbourg)	5:08
9	"So Sorry" (Leslie Feist)	4:07
10	"Detour Ahead" (Lou Carter, Johnny Freigo, Herb Ellis)	4:40
11	"Let Me Love You" (Bart Howard)	3:32
12	"Day Dream" (Billy Strayhorn, Duke Ellington)	4:59
13	"No More Blues" (John Carl Hendricks, Antonio Carlos Jobim)	4:20
