= Sophie Day (singer) =

Canadian jazz singer

Sophie Day is the stage name of Sophie Tremblay, a Canadian jazz singer from Quebec. She is most noted for her 2020 album Clémence, a tribute album to Clémence DesRochers which was a shortlisted Juno Award finalist for Vocal Jazz Album of the Year at the Juno Awards of 2021.
