= Diana Panton =

Canadian jazz vocalist

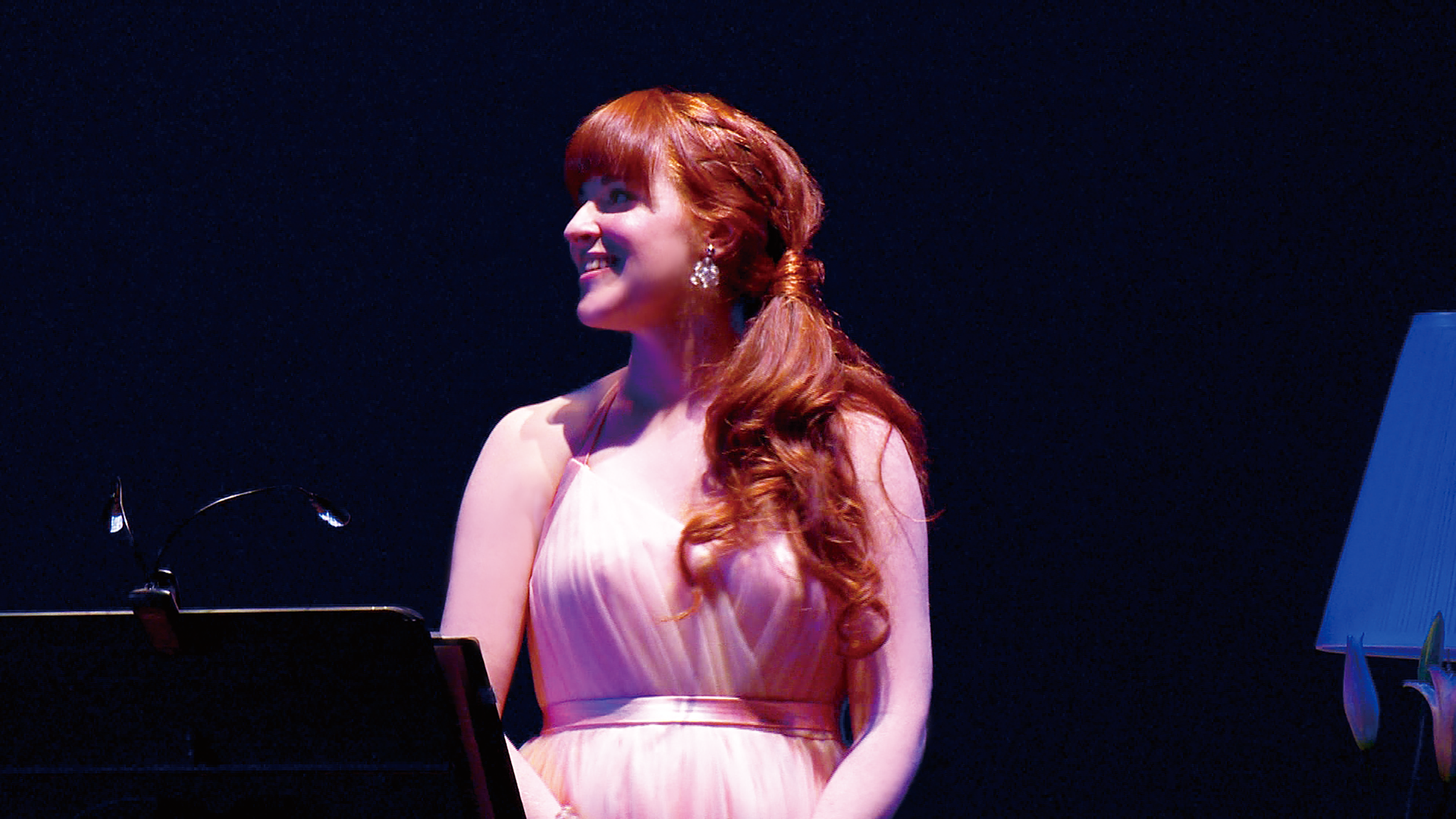
- Diana Panton in 2015

Background information
- Born: Diana Ariadne Panton; Hamilton, Ontario, Canada
- Genre: Jazz
- Occupation: Vocalist
- Years active: 2000–present
- Label: ILS-SRG
- Website: www.dianapanton.com

Diana Panton is a Canadian jazz vocalist. Her latest release, "soft winds and roses", topped the Jazz Best Seller Chart at Books.com in Taiwan and the Vocal Jazz Chart on Amazon Japan. Her album, blue, was awarded the 2023 Silver Disc Award by Japan's Jazz Critique Magazine. Her albums Yesterday Perhaps and Pink were awarded Silver Discs upon their release in Japan. blue also earned Panton her eighth JUNO nomination at the 2023 JUNO Awards in Canada. She won a Juno Award for Children's Album of the Year in 2017 for I Believe in Little Things and a 2015 Juno award for Vocal Jazz Album for RED. She received JUNO nominations for her albums Cheerful Little Earful (2020), Solstice/Equinox (2019), Christmas Kiss (2013), To Brazil with Love (2012) and If the Moon Turns Green...(2009). I Believe in Little Things debuted at No. 8 on the Billboard Jazz Chart while simultaneously debuting at No. 11 on the Billboard Children's Music Chart.

== Career ==
Panton's early jazz influence was hearing her father play an album by Ella Fitzgerald. In high school, she played violin and clarinet, then in her last year joined the Hamilton All-Star Jazz Band. which performed in Europe and the Montreux Jazz Festival. After hearing her perform with this band, multi-instrumentalist Don Thompson invited her to attend the Banff Centre, where he taught. This led to Thompson's collaboration on Panton's albums a decade later.

Panton holds a Master's degree in French literature from McMaster University and studied art at the Parsons School in Paris. She has taught courses at Westdale Secondary School and McMaster University in Hamilton, Ontario, as well as classes at Nanterre and Sorbonne universities in France.

== Discography ==
- ...yesterday perhaps (2005)
- if the moon turns green... (2007)
- pink (2009)
- To Brazil with Love (2011)
- Christmas Kiss (2012)
- RED (2013)
- Little Gems and Other Keepsakes (2013 - Taiwan only release)
- My Heart Sings LIVE (2014 - Taiwan only release)
- I Believe in Little Things (2015)
- Solstice/Equinox (2017)
- Yes, please! (2018 - Taiwan only release)
- A Cheerful Little Earful (2019)
- Fairy Sings Love Suite (2021 - Japan only release)
- blue (2022)
- soft winds and roses (2024)
