= Elizabeth Shepherd (musician) =

Canadian singer and pianist

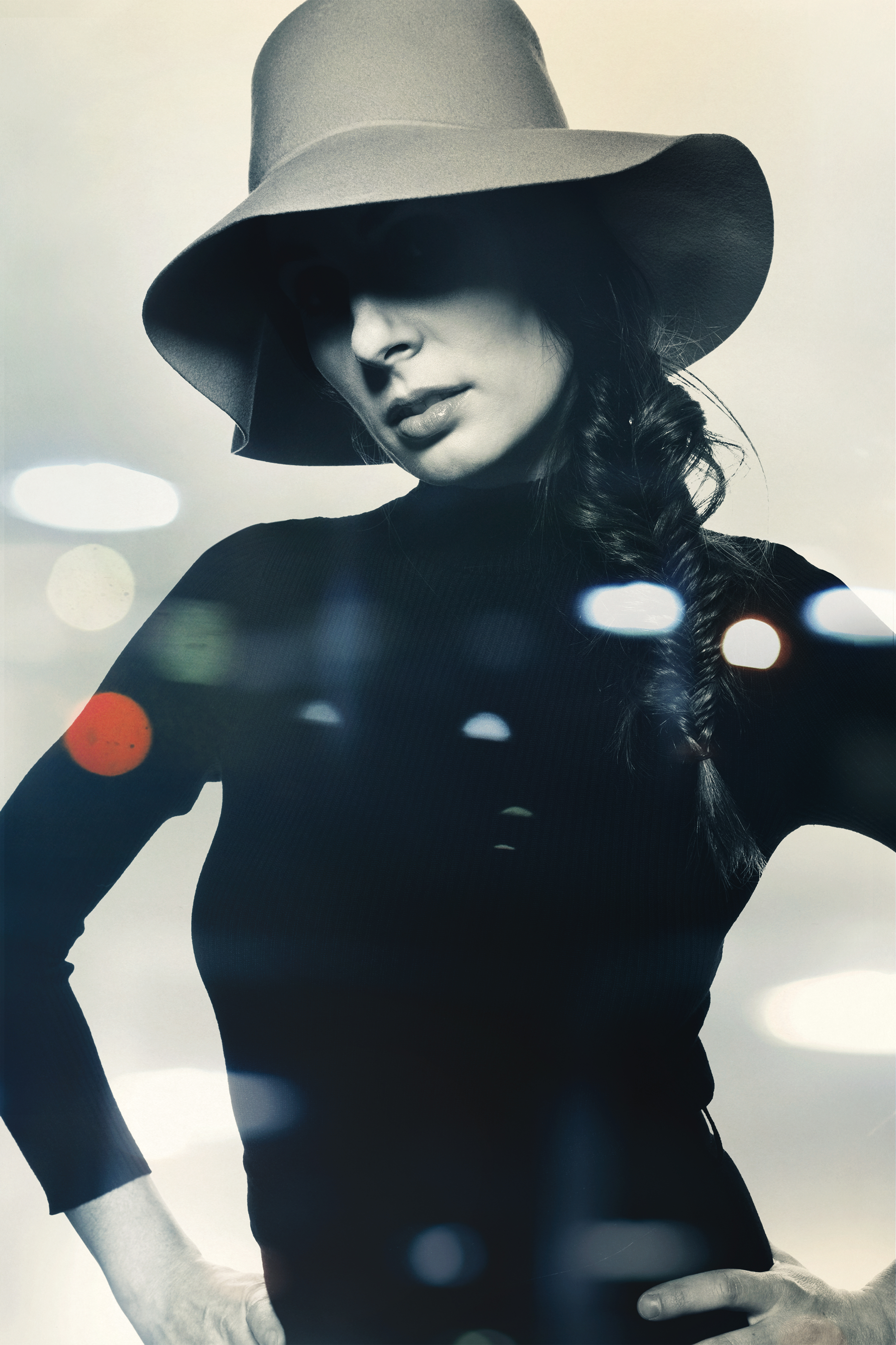

Background information
- Born: 1977 (age 48–49)
- Origin: Montreal, Quebec
- Genres: Vocal jazz, soul, pop, R&B
- Occupations: Singer, pianist, songwriter, arranger, producer
- Instruments: Vocals, piano
- Years active: 2006–present
- Labels: Pinwheel Music, Linus Entertainment, Do Right
- Website: www.elizabethshepherd.com

Elizabeth Shepherd is a Canadian pianist, singer, songwriter and producer.

== Early life ==
Born in 1977, Shepherd is the daughter of two ministers of The Salvation Army. From an early age, she grew up on choral music, brass bands and classical music. She studied classical piano at conservatories in Canada and France, then came to jazz through old school hiphop, to eventually complete a degree in jazz piano from McGill University in Montreal after considering a career in music therapy.

== Career ==
In 2004, Shepherd moved to Toronto and worked as a waitress at a piano bar. She began performing, and became a regular entertainer at the restaurant. She formed The Elizabeth Shepherd Trio with Scott Kemp on bass and Colin Kingsmore on drums. In 2006, she recorded her debut album, Start to Move, which was voted among the top three jazz albums of 2006 by the listeners of The Gilles Peterson Show on BBC Radio 1. The album was nominated for a Juno Award in 2007. The trio performed songs from the album at The Jazz Café in London, England.

Shepherd's second studio album, Parkdale (2008), dealt sympathetically with its Toronto neighbourhood namesake, which is known for its grit. The album was produced by Nostalgia 77, a DJ in London, and was nominated for a Juno Award in 2009.

Heavy Falls the Night (2010) featured only one cover song, a reworking of "Danny's Song". Shepherd produced the album with the exception of the first single, "Seven Bucks", which was co-produced with Japanese DJ Mitsu the Beats and climbed to No. 37 on the "Tokio Hot 100" chart. The album was long listed for the 2010 Polaris Music Prize.

In 2012, the choice of songs for her album Rewind was influenced by her pregnancy. The album consisted of jazz-pop cover versions of traditional pop songs by Cole Porter, the Gershwin brothers, Kurt Weill, and José Luis Perales. Rewind was dedicated to her daughter and was nominated for the Juno Award for Vocal Jazz Album of the Year in 2012.

Shepherd's album The Signal (2014) consisted of ten original songs on topics as varied as motherhood, Monsanto, witchcraft, and war, and featured guests such as Benin-born guitarist and composer Lionel Loueke and drummer Larnell Lewis. The album was long-listed for the Polaris Music Prize in 2015 and was nominated for the Juno Award for Vocal Jazz Album of the Year in 2015.

Her 2019 concept album, MONTREAL, is a soulful blend of film and music into an ode celebrating her hometown and its rich history of untold stories. It was nominated for a JUNO Award in 2020 in the vocal jazz category. She wrote a book that accompanies the album that won 2 Word Guild Awards.

Three Things (2023) is a hybrid of soulful sounds and synth-based electronica. Created during lockdown, it features collaborations with Danish bassist Jasper Hoiby and Canadian guitarist Michael Occhipinti.

Shepherd has performed at jazz clubs internationally, spanning Japan, China, Europe, North America and Central America, from Tokyo's Cotton Club to London's Jazz Café and Detroit's Cliff Bell's. She has appeared at festivals on both sides of the Atlantic, including Montreal Jazz Festival, ELB Jazz and the North Sea Jazz Festival. In 2009, she was invited by British singer Jamie Cullum to open for him at a sold-out show at the Hollywood Bowl, alongside Christian McBride. She has also shared the stage with the likes of Bonobo, Five Corners Quintet, Victor Wooten, Spankie Wilson, the JazzCotech Dancers, and the Quantic Soul Orchestra.

Shepherd has appeared on public radio networks around the world including NPR (US), P2 (Sweden), IMER (Mexico), ARD (Germany). She has also performed on The Gilles Peterson Show on BBC Radio 1 (UK), J-Wave's Modaista (Japan), and Q on CBC Radio (Canada).

She has appeared as a guest vocalist / pianist on albums by various artists, such as MC Abdominal, Peter Appleyard, Michael Occhipinti, Andrea Superstein, Drumhand, and Circle Research.

Beyond her work as a musician, she has also produced albums for Andrea Superstein, Paloma Sky, as well as 5 of her own albums.

== Critical reception ==
With Robert Glasper, Esperanza Spalding and Jose James, Shepherd is credited with invigorating the vocal jazz song and bringing jazz-influenced music to a wider audience. Real Detroit Weekly has called her "a jazz virtuoso blessed with a pop sensibility", while Mojo Magazine has described her as "wholly unique - an unclassifiable style that blurs the boundaries between jazz, R&B, pop, and hip hop".

Her catalog of 8 original albums has received critical attention internationally. She has been nominated 6 times for a JUNO Award (Canada's Grammy Awards), was recipient of the SOCAN songwriter award (2017) for her song 'Seven Bucks' (produced by Japanese DJ Mitsu), has been twice long-listed for the Polaris Prize (Canada's most prestigious musical award), was twice awarded Vocal Jazz Album of the Year at the Canadian INDIES Awards (2007, 2011), was nominated for jazz vocalist of the year at the National Jazz Awards (2009), and received a 2023 Word Guild award for her book, 'MONTREAL'.

== Discography ==
- Start to Move (Do Right, 2006)
- Besides (Do Right, 2007)
- Parkdale (Do Right, 2008)
- Heavy Falls the Night (Do Right, 2010)
- Rewind (Pinwheel/Linus Entertainment 2012)
- The Signal (Linus, 2014), feat. Lionel Loueke
- MONTREAL (Pinwheel Music, 2019)
- Three Things (Pinwheel Music, 2023), feat. Jasper Hoiby
