= Dwayne Morgan =

Dwayne Morgan may refer to:

- Dwayne Morgan (poet)
- Dwayne Morgan (gridiron football)
