= Laura Anglade =

Canadian jazz singer

Laura Anglade is a French-American jazz singer. She won the Juno Award for Vocal Jazz Album of the Year at the 2026 Juno Awards for her album Get Out of Town. She was previously nominated in the same category at the 2023 Juno Awards for her album Venez donc chez moi. Anglade was born in Montpellier, Hérault, France, and raised in Connecticut, United States. At the age of 18, she moved to Montreal, Quebec, to study translation at Concordia University. Although she did not pursue a formal music degree, singing was a significant part of her upbringing. During high school, she studied with vocal mentors Matthew Surapine and David Lahm.

After living in Toronto for several years, Anglade moved to New York City, where she is based.

She is signed to Nettwerk Music Group, managed by Knitting Factory Management, and represented by International Music Network (IMN) and Loop Productions.

Anglade has performed at jazz festivals, including the Montreal International Jazz Festival and the Jazz à Juan festival in Juan-les-Pins, France, as well as venues across North America, Europe, and Japan. Her television appearances include performances on The Late Show with Stephen Colbert through its LateShowMeMusic series and The Kelly Clarkson Show. Anglade also appeared in the HBO television series It: Welcome to Derry, portraying Norma Price.

== Discography ==
- I've Got Just About Everything - 2019
- Venez donc chez moi - 2022
- Get Out of Town - 2025
- Something's Coming - 2026 (scheduled for release on November 13)
