= Barbara Adler =

Canadian poet and musician

Barbara Adler is a musician, poet, and storyteller based in Vancouver, British Columbia. She is a past Canadian Team Slam Champion, was a founding member of the Vancouver Youth Slam, and a past CBC Poetry Face Off winner.

She was a founding member of the folk band The Fugitives with Brendan McLeod, C.R. Avery, and Mark Berube until she left the band in 2011 to pursue other artistic ventures. She was a member of the accordion shout-rock band Fang, later Proud Animal, and works under the pseudonym Ten Thousand Wolves.

In 2004, she participated in the inaugural Canadian Festival of Spoken Word, winning the Spoken Wordlympics with her fellow team members Shane Koyczan, C.R. Avery, and Brendan McLeod. In 2010, she started on The BC Memory Game, a traveling storytelling project based on the game of memory and had been involved with the B.C. Schizophrenia Society Reach Out Tour for several years. She is of Czech-Jewish descent.

Barbara Adler has her bachelor's degree and MFA from Simon Fraser University, with a focus on songwriting, storytelling, and community engagement. In 2015, she was a co-star in the film Amerika, directed by Jan Foukal, which premiered at the Karlovy Vary International Film Festival.

== Bibliography ==
- Squeezebox and Hound
- B.C. Memory Game

== Discography ==
- Flusterbush (2007)

With The Fugitives:

- In Streetlight Communion (2007)
- Face of Impurity (2007)
- Find Me (2009)
- Eccentrically We Love (2010)

With Fang:

- Diskopatska (2010)

With Proud Animal:

- Proud Animal (2012)
