= Sammy Jackson (singer) =

Canadian singer

Sammy Jackson is a Canadian jazz and rhythm and blues singer from St. Catharines, Ontario, whose 2020 EP With You won the Juno Award for Vocal Jazz Album of the Year at the Juno Awards of 2021.

Jackson, who studied vocal performance at the University of Toronto, released her debut EP, Take Me Back, in 2016.
