= Ale Nuñez =

Canadian jazz singer

- Nuñez in 2019

Background information
- Born: Toronto, Ontario, Canada
- Education: Humber College
- Genre: Jazz
- Occupation: Singer
- Years active: 2019–present

Ale Nuñez is a Canadian jazz singer. She was nominated for a Juno Award in the category Vocal Jazz Album of the Year for the album Under the Lemon Tree.
