= The Raving Poets =

Canadian performance collective

The Raving Poets was a collective of poets and musicians who held a series of live, weekly poetry with music events in Edmonton, Alberta, Canada. It ran from 2000 to 2010.

The Raving Poets was conceived as an open mic poetry event with improvised musical accompaniment, in a variety of musical and poetic styles. Poetry has included slam, hip-hop, erotica and nature poetry, including political and confessional elements. Music styles have included folk, rock, jazz, ambient, experimental and other electronica.

== History ==
The Raving Poets had several open mic ‘music and poetry’ precedents in Edmonton, but the actual first ‘music with poetry’ event happened in the summer of the year 2000.

That year, three of the ‘founding fathers’ were board members with the Stroll of Poets Society, an Edmonton poetry group that hosted two annual reading series. Mark Kozub was president, Thomas Trofimuk, Volunteer Coordinator and Gordon McRae, Treasurer. The Board was tasked with finding ways to expand and revitalize the Society, which faced declining membership.

During the May 4th, 2000 Stroll of Poets board meeting, in keeping with the expansion mandate, three new "Subsidiary Roles" were created, Media Liaison, Liaison with other Arts Groups and Open Stage Coordinator. Though both Mark and Thomas were optioned for sharing the role of Media Liaison, it is the Open Stage Coordinator role that gave Mark the impetus to start up something completely new – with Thomas sharing the hosting duties with him.

The new reading series, Poetry Tuesdays ran through February, March, and April 2000. The Backroom Vodka Bar was used as the venue of choice in two of those three months. The ad of the March series ran, “Beware the Odes of March, hosted by Phil, the Cowboy Poet with The Art to Choke Hearts band.” Though Mark and Thomas read during the March series, neither were part of the ‘band’.

“The Raving Poets” began as the name of a reading series, but soon came to be thought of as the name of the band, and later, the collective of poets and musicians who performed together on weekday evenings.

On March 23, 2002, Mark, Thomas and Gordon left the Board and the Society for good during the Stroll’s Annual General Meeting. From then on, their energies were directed solely toward the Raving Poets.

Performers have included Suzanne Steele and Sheri-D Wilson.

== The Roar ==
The Raving Poets created a festival, The Roar, which ran for two years, 2006 and 2007, between the demise of the Stroll of Poets “stroll” and the advent of the Edmonton Poetry Festival.

== Series ==
- Peace Talks, 2001
- The Beat Goes On, 2002
- Pig Poetry, 2003
- Fall of Love, September 23 to November 25, 2003
- Mumbo Jumbo, A Word Circus, April 6 to August ??, 2004
- Kill Phil, vol. 2, September 7 to December 7, 2004
- Rock the Kasbar, February 8 to April 26, 2006
- Rapture, February 1 to May 31, 2007
- Space Monkey, November 7 to December 12, 2007
- Heart Beat, March 5 to May 28, 2008
- Born to Write, October 15 to December 3, 2008
- Sofa King, April 1 to May 27, 2009
- 9½, October 7 to December 2, 2009
- Sotto Voce, April 12 to ??, 20??

== Venues ==
- The Backroom Vodka Bar, 2003–2006
- The Kasbar Lounge, 2006–2010

== Recordings ==
- Peace Talks, 8-CD set, 2001
- The Beat Goes On, 8-CD set, 2002
- Pig Poetry, 2-CD set, 2003
- Mumbo Jumbo, A Word Circus, CD, 2004
- The Raving Poets - Remixed, CD, 2007
- Live at the Kasbar, podcast, 2006
