= Rabbit Richards =

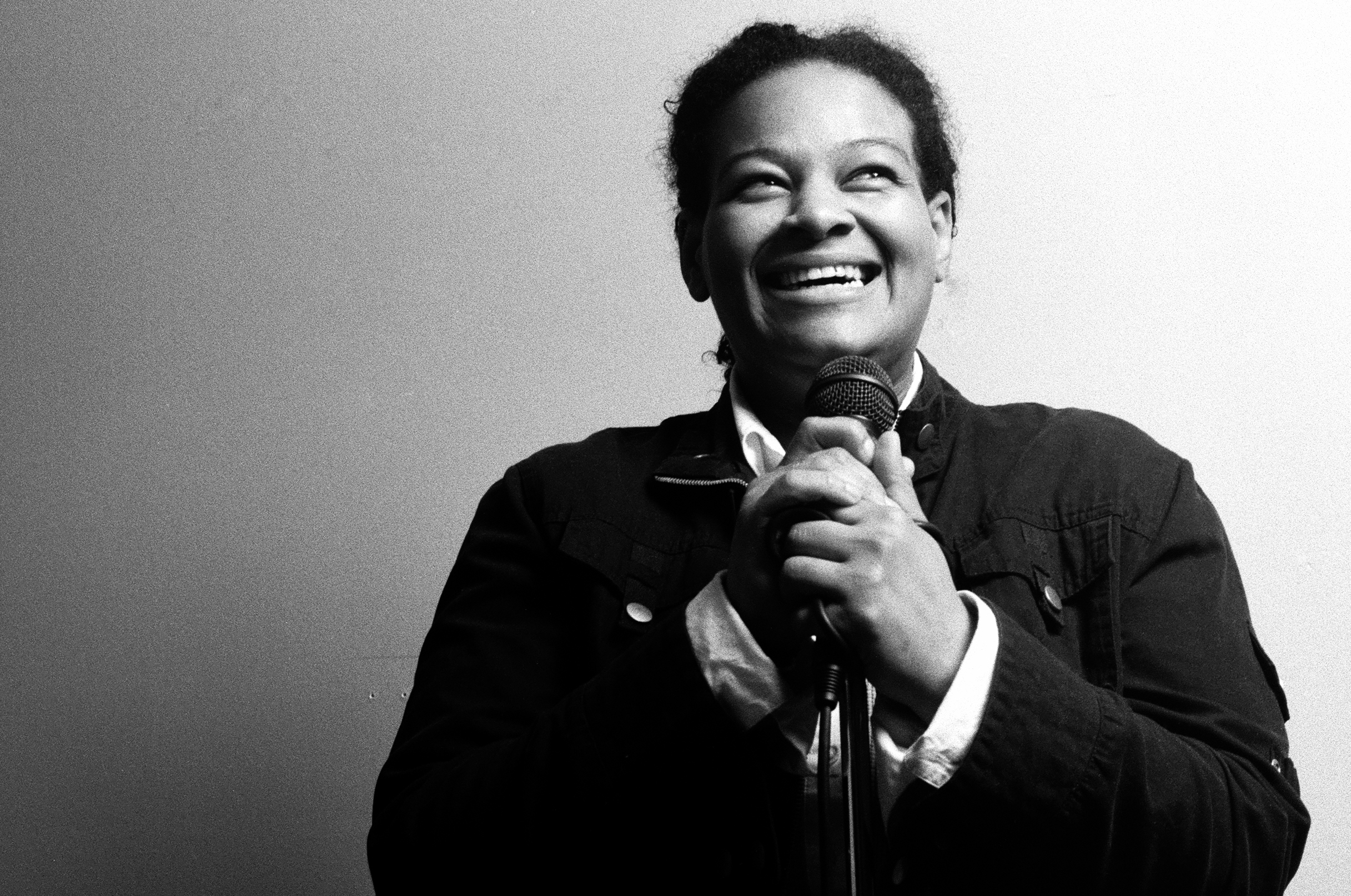

Rabbit Richards is a New York-born performance poet who has been based out of Montreal for several years. Their stories and poetry blend the politics of race, love and gender with the emotional grounding of lived experience. They are a member of the Kalmunity Vibe Collective and a practiced improvisational artist. Richards is also the two time captain of Montreal's Throw Poetry Collective.

Richards is non-binary. In 2015, they were recognized as the first woman to ever win the Underground Indies poetry slam at the Canadian Festival of Spoken Word.
