= The Fugitives (spoken word) =

Folk music group from Vancouver

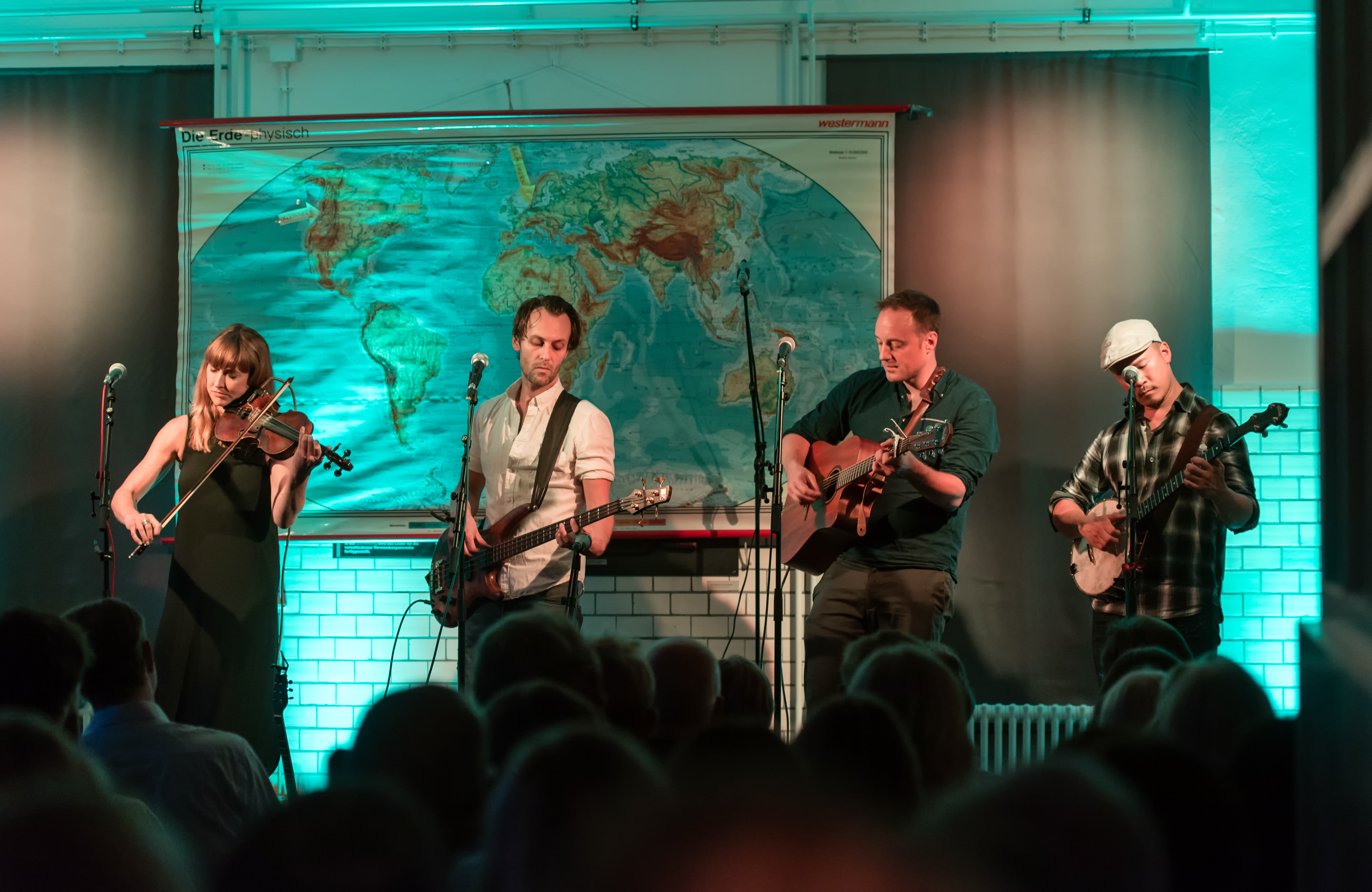
- The Fugitives in 2018

Background information
- Origin: Vancouver, British Columbia, Canada
- Genres: Spoken word, folk
- Years active: 2004–present
- Label: Light Organ
- Members: Adrian Glynn; Brendan McLeod; Carla Frey; Chris Suen
- Past members: Mark Berube; CR Avery; Barbara Adler; Steve Charles
- Website: fugitives.ca

The Fugitives are a Canadian Folk music group formed in 2004 in Vancouver. The members of the band are Brendan McLeod (guitar and vocals) and Adrian Glynn (vocals, guitar, lap steel, balalaika), along with Carla Frey (violin and vocals) and Chris Suen (banjo, ukelele and vocals).

Former members of the band included Mark Berube (banjo and vocals), C.R. Avery (beat box and vocals), and Barbara Adler (vocals, accordion) who left the band to pursue other artistic ventures.

Fans and critics find the group difficult to classify—they have been categorized as slam folk, folk hop, and spoken word cabaret. The Georgia Straight called The Fugitives "wildly talented spoken-word artists".

== Discography ==
- In Streetlight Communion (2007)
- Find Me (EP) (2009)
- Eccentrically We Love (2010)
- Bigger than Luck (EP) (2013)
- Everything Will Happen (2013)
- The Promise of Strangers (2018)
- Trench Songs (2020)
- No Help Coming (2023)
- The Fugitives (2026)
