= Ima (Yvette Tollar album) =

Studio album by Yvette Tollar
- Released: 2008
- Recorded: 20 Hz Sound Studio
- Genre: Jazz

Yvette Tollar chronology
Cactus Flowers (2001)	Ima (2008)

Ima is an album by Canadian jazz vocalist Yvette Tollar, released in 2008.

Released in November 2008 at Glenn Gould Studio in Toronto, Ima (ROM10), is a collection of Canadian written contemporary jazz songs. CBC Radio recorded the CD release concert for national broadcast on their Canada Live program.

The record was made with support from The Canada Council For The Arts and FACTOR. In 2009, it received a Juno Award nomination for Best Vocal Jazz Album Of The Year.

== Track listing ==
1. "Contradiction"
2. "Do You Remember Me?"
3. "Edith and The Kingpin"
4. "I Forgive You"
5. "Fall Down"
6. "Sick Rose"
7. "Hang On"
8. "Prayer for Humankindness" (Full Band)
9. "Glittering Precipice"
10. "Ima"
11. "Prayer for Humankindness" (Piano & Voice Duo)

== Personnel ==
- Yvette Tollar – voice
- Dave Restivo – piano
- David Virelles – piano, Rhodes
- Robi Botos – piano
- Ernie Tollar – saxophones, flutes, clarinet
- Rich Brown – bass
- Larnell Lewis – drums

Special Guests:

- Kevin Breit – guitar, mandolin
- Mark Duggan – kalimba
- Ravi Naimpally – tabla
- Debashis Sinha – dumbek
- Allison Long – background vocals
- Sophia Grigoriadis – background vocals
- Producers: Yvette Tollar and Rich Brown.
- Recorded at Canterbury Sound Studio.
- Additional recording: Collin Barrett
- Engineers: Jeremy Darby - Canterbury Sound Studio, Collin Barrett
- Edited at Canterbury Sound Studio by Sam Ibbett, Victory Drive Studio by Jono Grant, and 20 Hz Sound Studio by Collin Barrett.
- Mixed at: 20 Hz Sound Studio by Collin Barrett.
- Mastered at: The Lacquer Channell by George Graves
