= Make Someone Happy (Sophie Milman album) =

Studio album by Sophie Milman
- Released: June 19, 2007
- Genre: Jazz
- Length: 56:14
- Label: Linus
- Producer: Steven MacKinnon

Sophie Milman chronology
Live at the Winter Garden Theatre (2007)	Make Someone Happy (2007)	Take Love Easy (2009)

Professional ratings
Review scores
Source	Rating
Allmusic	4/5 stars

Make Someone Happy is the second studio album by Sophie Milman. The album was released on June 19, 2007.

== Track listing ==
No.	Title	Writer(s)	Length
1.	"People Will Say We're in Love"	Richard Rodgers, Oscar Hammerstein II	3:08
2.	"Something in the Air Between Us"	Steve McKinnon	4:12
3.	"Rocket Love"	Stevie Wonder	4:33
4.	"So Long, You Fool"	Paul Shrofel, Sharada Banman	3:04
5.	"Matchmaker, Matchmaker"	Jerry Bock, Sheldon Harnick	3:16
6.	"Like Someone in Love"	Jimmy Van Heusen, Johnny Burke	3:30
7.	"Make Someone Happy"	Jule Styne, Betty Comden, Adolph Green	4:00
8.	"(It's Not Easy) Bein' Green"	Joe Raposo	4:41
9.	"Reste (Stay)"	Cameron Wallis	3:21
10.	"Fever"	Eddie Cooley, John Davenport	5:13
11.	"Undun"	Randy Bachman	3:38
12.	"It Might as Well Be Spring"	Rodgers, Hammerstein II	3:36
13.	"Eli, Eli (A Walk to Caesarea)"	Hannah Senesh	3:39

Bonus Track
No.	Title	Writer(s)	Length
14.	"Stay [English version]"	Cameron Wallis	3:31
15.	"Save Your Love for Me"		4:49
