= Brendan McLeod =

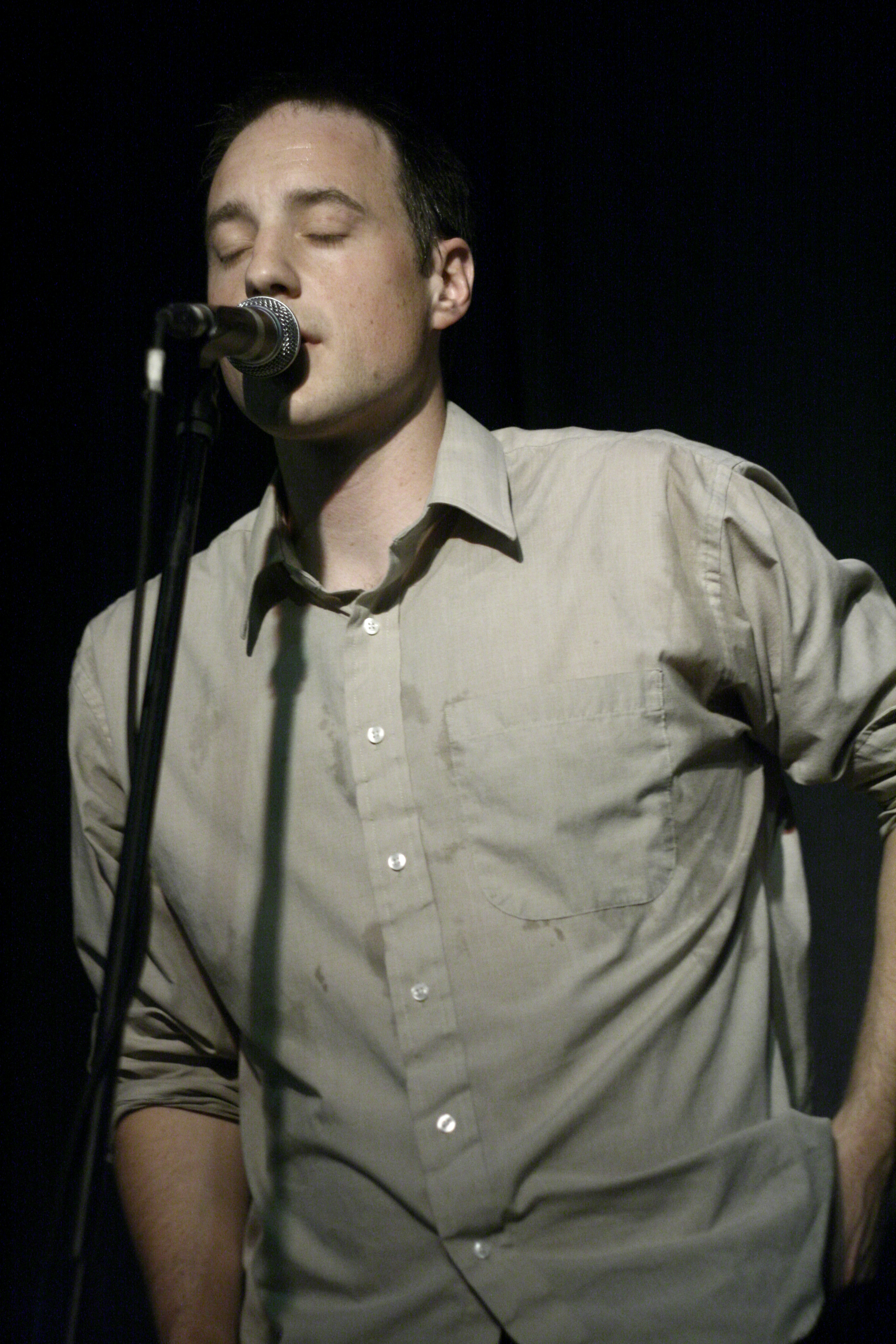
- Brendan McLeod performing in June of 2009 at Cafe Deux Soleils
- Born: 1979 (age 46–47); Saskatoon, Saskatchewan
- Occupations: spoken word artist, musician, novelist, poet
- Website: Brendan McLeod

Brendan McLeod is a Canadian spoken word artist, musician and novelist. His work often deals with the exploration of social and political commentary, family histrionics, surreal love poems, obscure adventure stories, and powerful personal stories.

As a spoken word artist and slam poet, he has earned the honours of Canadian SLAM poetry champion (2004), Vancouver SLAM poetry champion (2005), and finished second at the 2005 World SLAM championships, held in the Netherlands. In 2006 McLeod was winner of the Three-Day Novel Contest and consequently his first novel, The Convictions of Leonard McKinley was published by Arsenal Pulp Press. The novel has been called both "creepy but...good" and a work of "buoyant irony".

McLeod is also a member of The Fugitives, a "wildly talented spoken-word-cranked" Vancouver-based band also including Adrian Glynn and Steven Charles. Notable former members of The Fugitives include C.R. Avery, Barbara Adler, and Mark Berube. The group has been classified under many guises including slam folk, folk hop, and spoken word cabaret.
