= Sophie Milman =

Canadian jazz singer (born 1983)

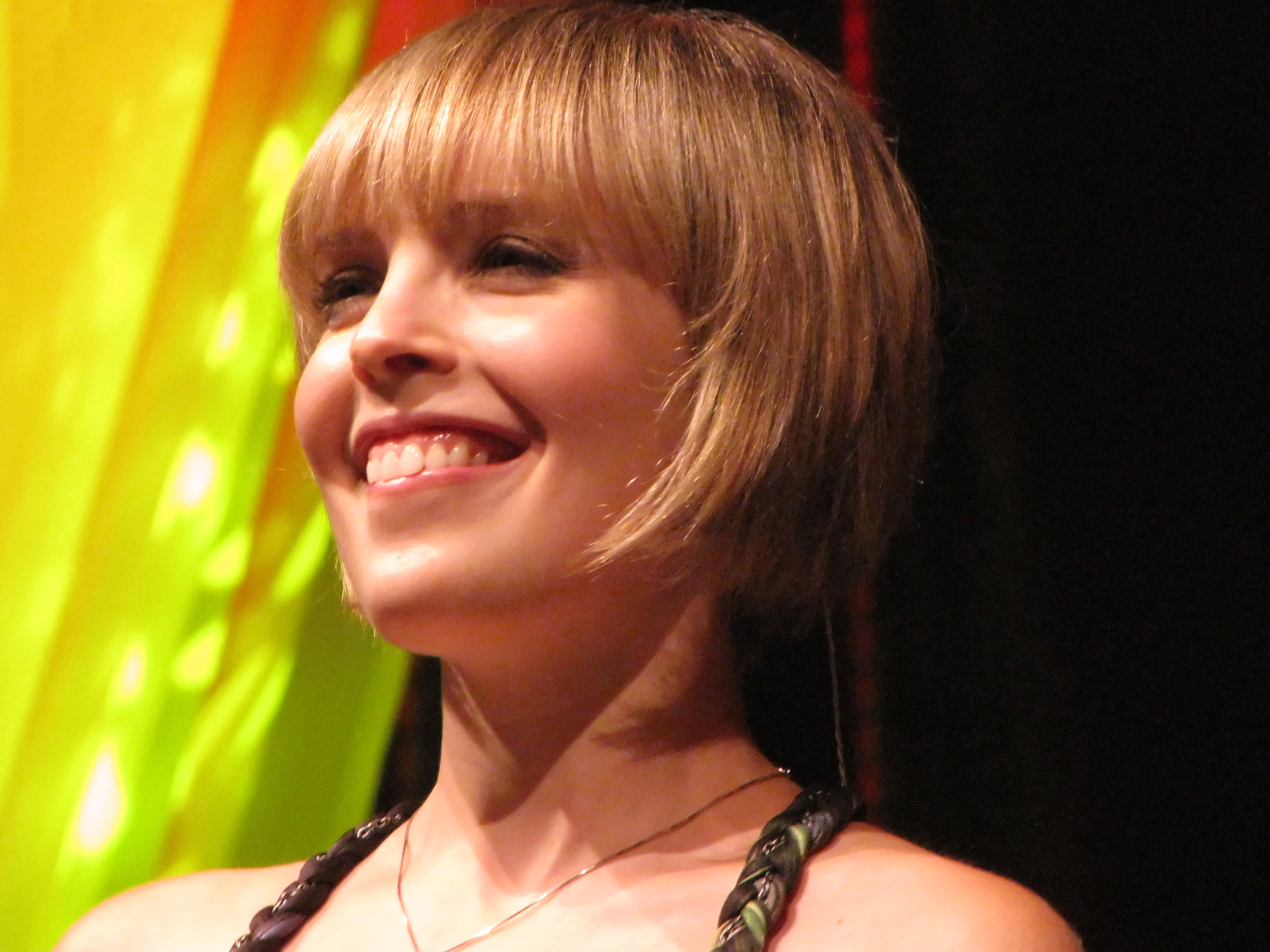
- Milman in 2010

Background information
- Born: 1983 (age 42–43); Ufa, Russian SFSR, Soviet Union
- Genres: Jazz, pop standards
- Occupation: Singer
- Years active: 2004–present
- Label: Linus Entertainment
- Website: sophiemilman.com

Sophie Milman (born 1983) is a Russian-born Canadian jazz vocalist.

After emigrating from Russia in the early 1990s, Milman, who is Jewish, spent most of her childhood years in Israel where she listened extensively to jazz. Her family later emigrated to Toronto, Canada.

Milman's self-titled debut album was released on October 12, 2004, in Canada by Linus Entertainment and in 2006 in the United States by Koch. She graduated from the University of Toronto in 2011 with a Bachelor of Commerce degree.

Milman was married to lawyer, professor, and musician Casey Chisick. They separated in 2024. He was executive producer on her albums Make Someone Happy (2007) and Take Love Easy (2009) as well as her concert DVD Live in Montreal (2008).

Milman's recording of "So Long, You Fool" is used in commercials for Air Wick's Winter Collection candles.

Milman won 2008 Juno Award for Vocal Jazz Album of the Year for Make Someone Happy. She earned a Grammy Award nomination in 2018 for her involvement with Yiddish Glory.

== Discography ==
- Sophie Milman (Linus Entertainment, 2006)
- Make Someone Happy (Linus, 2007)
- Take Love Easy (Linus, 2009)
- In the Moonlight (eOne, 2011)
- Live at the Winter Garden Theatre (Linus, 2013)
