= Yvette Tollar =

Canadian musician

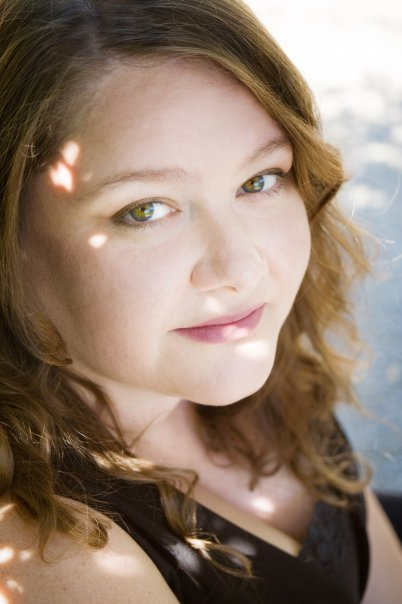

Background information
- Born: Yvette Tollar; Toronto, Ontario, Canada
- Genres: Jazz
- Occupations: Vocalist, Composer, Producer, Educator
- Instrument: Voice
- Years active: (2001 – present)

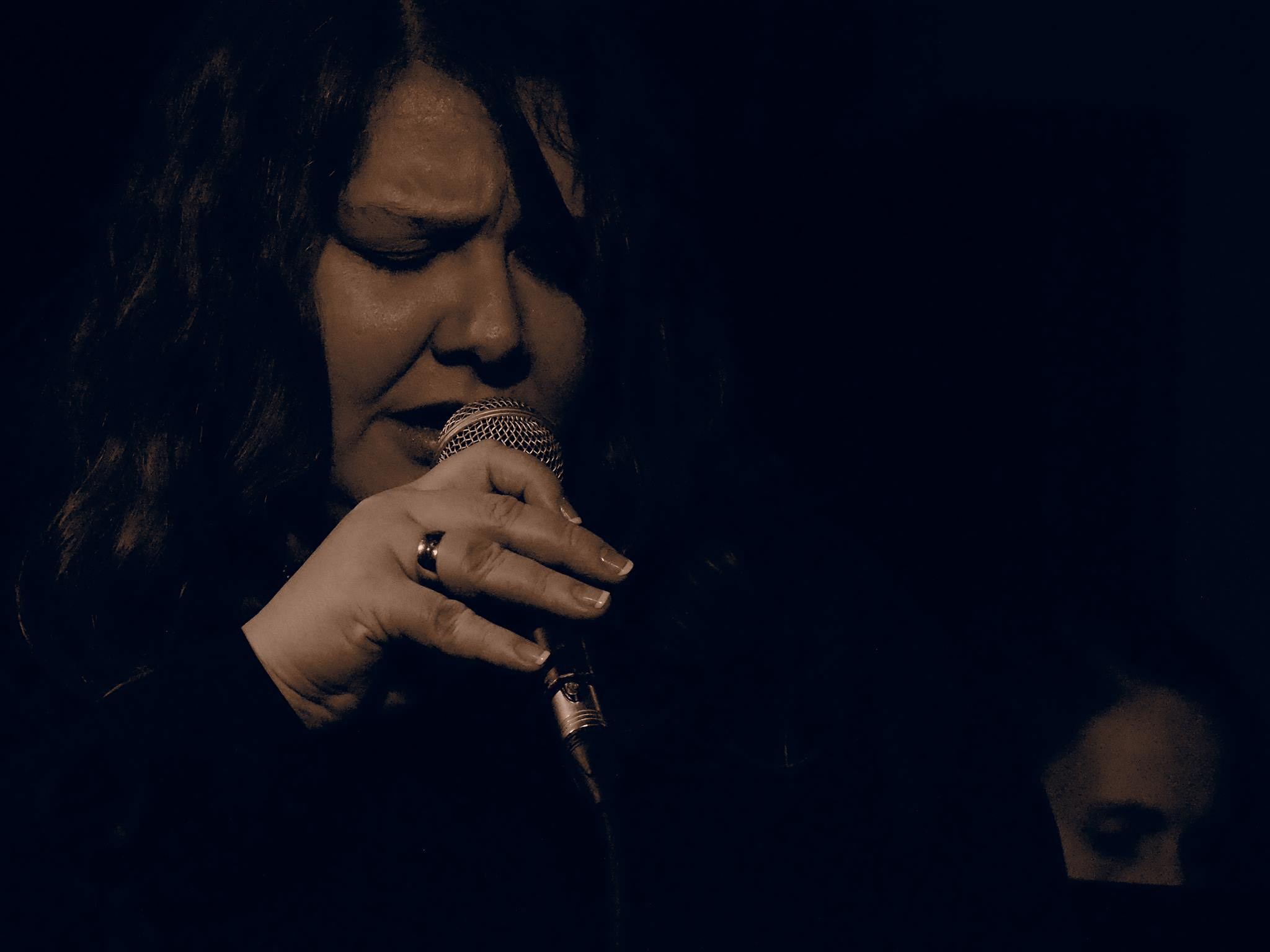
Yvette Tollar

Yvette Tollar is a Canadian jazz vocalist born in Toronto, Ontario. She has released two full-length CDs, Cactus Flowers (2001) and Ima (2008). Ima was a nominee for Vocal Jazz Album of the Year at the 2009 Juno Awards.

Tollar studied jazz with vocalist Sheila Jordan in New York and with Joe Lovano and Dave Holland at the Banff Centre for The Arts.
