= Laila Biali =

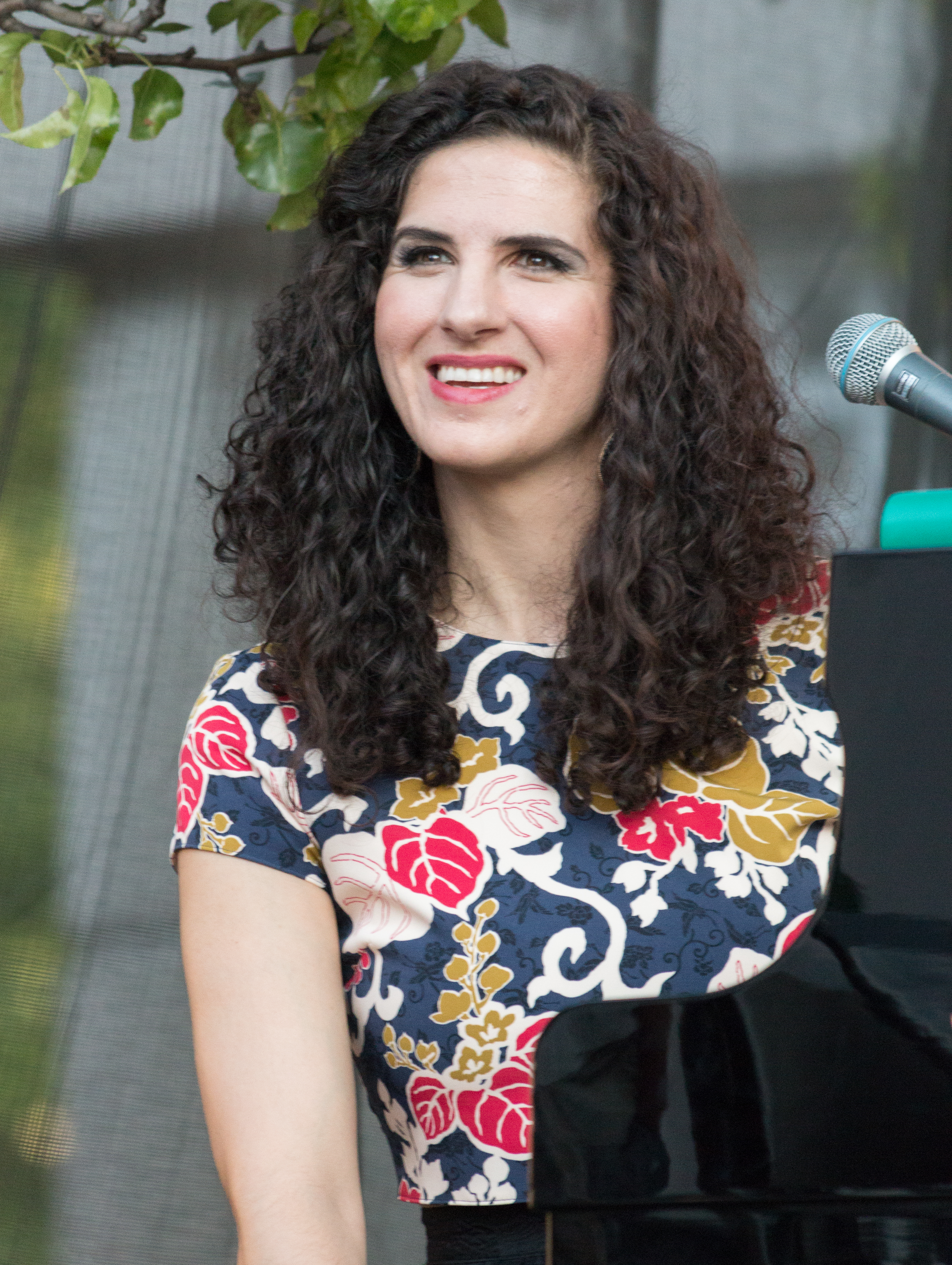
- Biali at Burlington's Sound of Music Festival in 2016

Background information
- Born: 3 October 1980 (age 46); Vancouver, British Columbia, Canada
- Genres: Jazz, smooth jazz
- Occupations: Musician, singer
- Instrument: Piano
- Years active: 2000–present
- Website: www.lailabiali.com

Laila Biali (born 3 October 1980) is a Canadian jazz singer and pianist. She has been nominated for and won a Juno Award and has worked with Chris Botti and Sting.

== Career ==
Born in Vancouver, Biali began playing piano at a young age. She studied classical piano for many years. At the Royal Conservatory of Music she was attracted to jazz, and when she was nineteen she entered Humber College in Toronto. Four years later she released the album Introducing the Laila Biali Trio.

She moved to New York City and found work as a pianist and vocalist for other musicians. While touring with Paula Cole, she met drummer Ben Wittman, and she and Wittman later married. In 2009 she sang background vocals for Sting's DVD A Winter's Night: Live from Durham Cathedral. She toured with Chris Botti and Suzanne Vega. She has performed at Carnegie Hall in New York City and at Glenn Gould Theatre in Toronto.

Her second album, Tracing Light (2010), received a Juno Award nomination. She recorded House of Many Rooms (2014) with strings and the Toronto Mass Choir. For this album Biali wrote songs and the arrangements. In 2014, she joined the female band Rose & the Nightingale. A few years later she appeared as guest host for Tonic, a jazz program on CBC Radio 2, then became the regular host for Saturday Night Jazz.

Her self-titled 2018 album won the Juno Award for Vocal Jazz Album of the Year.

== Awards and honours ==
- CBC Galaxie Prize, Rising Star Award, National Jazz Awards
- Society of Composers, Authors and Music Publishers of Canada Keyboardist of the Year and Composer of the Year, National Jazz Awards
- 2020 SOCAN Special Award. Haygood Hardy Award for excellence in jazz, instrumental or world music
- For 2026 Grammy Awards, she received a nomination for the album Wintersongs in the Best Traditional Pop Vocal Album category.

== Discography ==
- Introducing the Laila Biali Trio (self-released, 2003)
- Laila Live (CBC, 2006)
- From Sea to Sky (CBC, 2007)
- Tracing Light (self-released, 2010)
- Live in Concert (self-released, 2012)
- House of Many Rooms (self-released, 2014)
- Laila Biali (ACT, 2018)
- Out of Dust (ACT, 2020)
- Your Requests (ACT, 2023)
- Wintersongs (2026)
