= Open mic =

Live show at a variety of different clubs

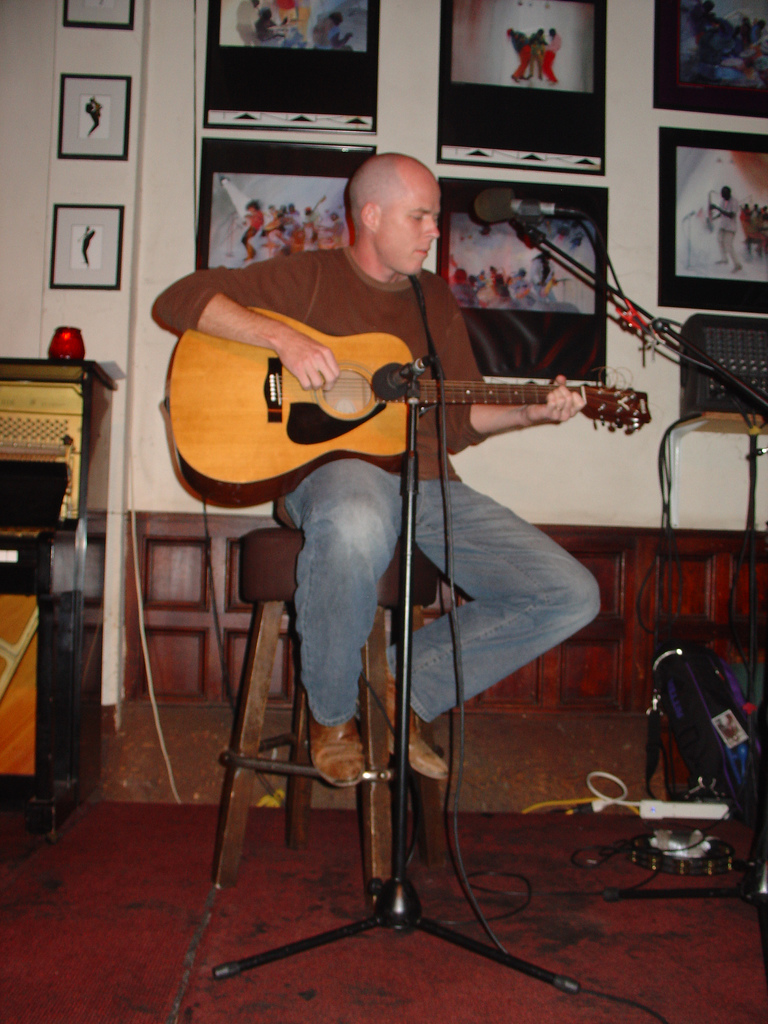
A musician at a Sausalito open mic in July 2008

An open mic or open mike (shortened from "open microphone") is a live show at a venue such as a coffeehouse, nightclub, comedy club, strip club, or pub, often taking place at night (an open mic night), in which audience members may perform on stage whether they are amateurs or professionals, often for the first time or to promote an upcoming performance. As the name suggests, performers are usually provided with a microphone plugged into a PA system so that they can be better heard by the audience.

Performers may sign up in advance for a time slot with the host, who is typically an experienced performer or the venue's manager or owner. The host may screen potential candidates for suitability for the venue and give them a time to perform during the show. Open mics are focused on performance arts such as comedy (whether it be sketch or stand-up), music (often acoustic singer-songwriters), poetry, and spoken word. It is less common for groups such as rock bands or comedy troupes to perform, mostly because of the space and logistical requirements of preparing equipment and soundchecking such groups.

Open mics may have very low entrance fees or no entrance fees at all, although the venue itself may prepare a gratuity jar, a "pass the hat" for donations, or a raffle with various prizes. Venues that charge no fees profit from selling drinks and food. The performers are not typically paid, although the venue may give them food or drink. If the host is an experienced professional and not the owner or the manager of the venue, they are usually paid for their services and may perform at some point during the evening, either preparing a full performance of their own or filling in at short notice when a performer is unavailable. Open mics are somewhat related to jam sessions, in that they both see amateur performers being given the opportunity to perform. The difference is that jam sessions often involve musical ensembles, possibly even a house band or rhythm section, and may involve the participation of professional performers.

== Music ==
Open mics provide an opportunity for emerging musicians to gain experience performing to a live audience without having to go through the process of getting normal music gigs, which is very difficult to do without experience or a demo recording. They provide an outlet for singer-songwriters. Prior to their popularity, the only outlets generally were folk clubs, which were not always friendly towards creators of new music and preferred traditional popular music. They also suggested that music performed by acoustic musicians or solo artists in this manner would necessarily be folk music, a misconception that still commonly exists today. Some organizers have chosen the title "acoustic night" or "acoustic club" in an attempt to indicate an event run broadly on the lines of a folk club, but with a much wider range of musical styles.

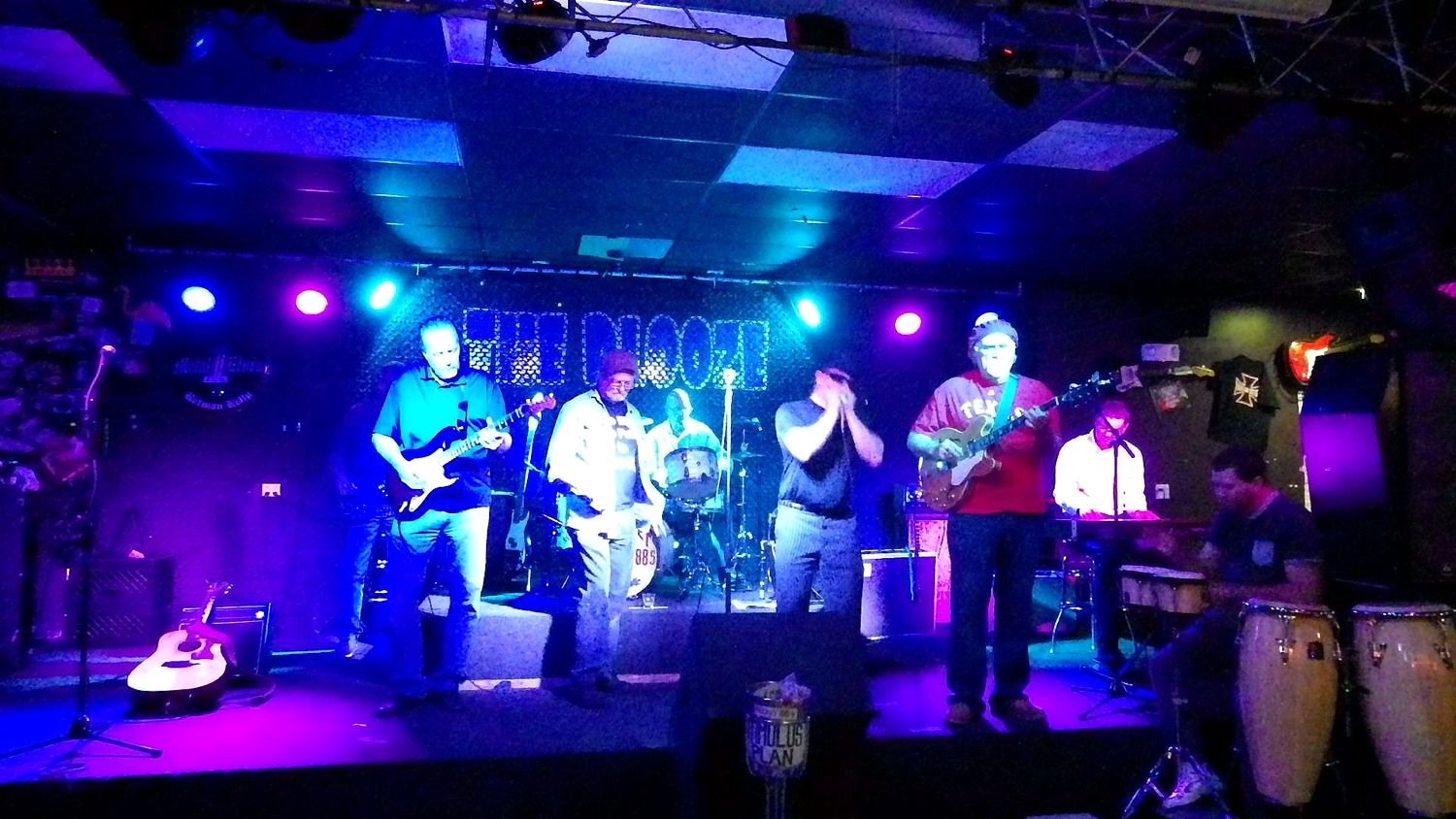
An open mic jam session in Phoenix in January 2015

Open mic events are most commonly held in the middle of the week or at the very end of the weekend when footfall through venues is low. They rarely occur on the hallowed Friday and Saturday night time slots, when venues are busy with weekend customers and any live performances are professionals who have been booked. The most common night for an open mic in the United Kingdom is Thursday, with Wednesday in second place.

A popular open mic arrangement in the United States is the "Blues Night". In this format, a bar or club will dedicate a particular night, usually in the middle of the week, as being "open mic blues night". The establishment may supply a house band, typically guitar, bass, and drums, and sometimes a keyboard. Singers, guitarists, and harmonica performers who wish to play sign up, usually with the host. This person is tasked with screening the performers, choosing and ordering, and getting the performers on and off stage in a polite manner.

Since the songs chosen need to be simple enough so that a band of musicians who have not played together can perform them without practice, blues standards are used. Songs might be announced as a "12-bar fast shuffle in C" or "slow 12-bar blues in F", or similar phrases that should be familiar to all concerned. Lead singers, keyboards, horn players (usually saxophones), and various percussion instruments are common additions.

== Comedy ==
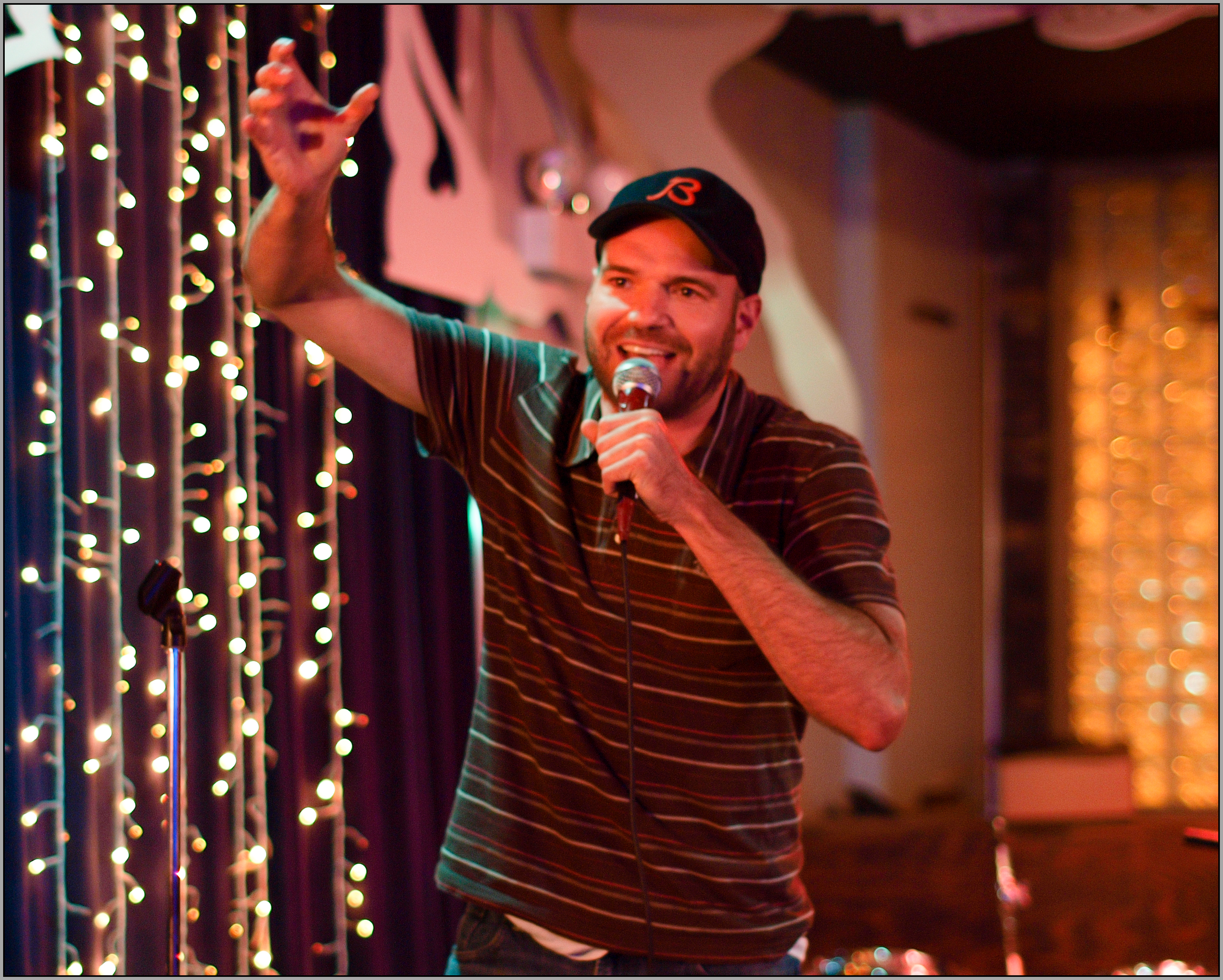
A stand-up comedy open mic night

Stand-up comedy open mic nights can be held at established comedy clubs but are more commonly held at other venues with or without a stage, often the upstairs or back room of a pub or bar, or at a bookstore, college campus, rock club, or coffeehouse. Less commonly, they are also held at venues such as strip clubs and comic book shops. Comedy clubs may be the only open mic establishments that have a green room, a backstage area for performers waiting to go on stage where no audience members are present.

Open mic nights give emerging comedians the opportunity to practice their stand-up routine, which they cannot do without a live audience. The audience for a typical comedy open mic is other comedians. Those underage must have their parents attend clubs with them. More experienced comedians may use open mics as an unpaid opportunity to work out newer material or a new character. Open mic comedy nights are most widespread in larger English-speaking cities with a well-established stand-up scene; the major examples include Boston, Chicago, London, and New York City. Stand-ups also use open mics for networking to find both paid and unpaid work opportunities, for making friends, or as a form of therapy.

"The room" is the term for the setting of a comedy performance; comedians are said to gauge the audience by their ability to "read the room". Stand-up performances have a designated stage area and use a microphone with amplification as an industry standard. Open mics for comedy have no minimum requirements to perform, a format which is known as "show and go". At a typical comedy open mic, acts will get 3–7 minutes of stage time. The routine of a five-minute slot requires approximately three minutes of material. All stand-up comedy performed must be an original creation.

The host of a stand-up comedy open mic tries to maintain an equilibrium of mood within "the room". Hosts will try to seat audience members close together near the designated front stage area because that seems to maximize the audience's feelings of enjoyment and may lead to increased laughter; of one such event, a reviewer wrote, "Tightly arranged seating within the comedy room created physical discomfort for audience members... yet audience members often talked about how much they enjoyed 'the feeling of a full house'. Conversely, when shows were not sold out and audience members had more room to spread out among empty tables and chairs, audience members were less likely to relate their experiences as one of entertainment or enjoyment." The host introduces each act by reciting the name that was placed on the sign-up list and asks the audience to give the performer an introductory round of applause. Performing first at an open mic puts the comedian at a disadvantage due to the audience being "cold" and is considered the most challenging spot to perform in.

Stand-ups usually use the second person to address the audience. In 2011, writer Rob Durham said that an open mic night should be no longer than 90 minutes and consist of no more than 15 acts. A comedy open mic will not normally exceed 30 people, which comedian Hannibal Buress has cited as the maximum number of people who should be there. It is common practice for stand-ups to record their sets for later review and rehearsal. The collective feedback from different audiences has a significant impact on how a stand-up routine is shaped.

The host will flash a light at the comedian one minute before their time is up as a signal to finish the joke they are currently telling, a practise known as "getting the light". In modern times, this is done with the flashlight from a cell phone so as not to distract the audience with a larger or brighter light. If a comedian ignores this light and continues to perform past their allotted time, this is known as "blowing the light" and may get the comedian banned from performing at that venue.

Other types of comedy open mics include "booked shows" and "bringer shows". Booked shows have a normal format, but performers reserve spots one week to one month in advance. Bringer shows are presented in a showcase format, with each performer being required to bring 5–15 people with them (with a cover charge and a two-drink minimum per person) in order to secure stage time, but this is widely seen as exploitative.

== Poetry, rapping and spoken word ==
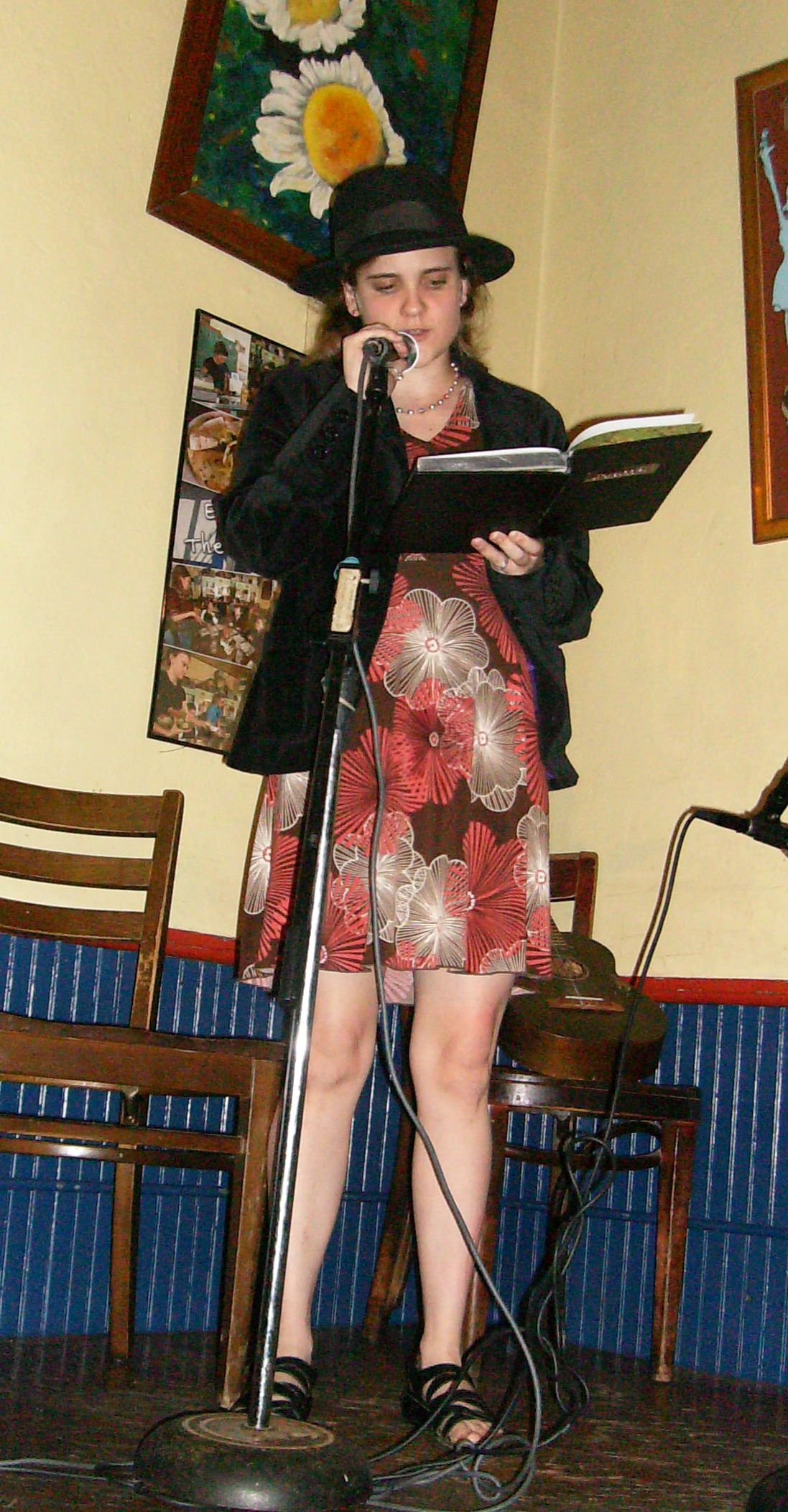
A poet reading her work at the Little Grill in June 2008

Poetry and spoken word open mics feature a host, who is normally a poet or spoken word artist, poets and spoken word artists, and audience members. Sometimes open mic nights have featured readers, or are part of a writing workshop, but generally a sign-up sheet is available for anyone interested in participating. Each participant is then called to come to the microphone and read a selection or two. Writers may attend an open mic to try out a new piece for an audience or to find out more about the local writing community. Others attend poetry open mics just to listen. Poetry/spoken word open mics range from laid back, serene settings to lively sessions where readers and/or performers compete for audience applause. They are usually held in libraries, coffee houses, cafes, bookstores and bars.

Each poet or spoken word artist is often asked to keep their performances to a minimum/specified time slot, giving each performer enough time to share some of their work with the audience. The host or MC acts as a "gatekeeper", determining which performers are suitable for the event. If a performer goes over their time limit, the host diplomatically thanks the performer for their contribution and asks them to yield the stage for the next performer.

== Rarer niche variations ==
The terms "open deck" (where "deck" refers to the kind of turntable used by a DJ) and "open reel" (where "reel" refers to a 35 mm film reel) are used for more niche open mic events where keen amateurs can meet to exhibit and critique their skills/artform. A decrease in the cost of consumer video technology combined with the powerful editing capabilities of modern PCs has caused an increase in the popularity of DJing and amateur filmmaking, but these types of events are still very rare.

== Benefits for performers ==
Performing at open mics as a musician, comedian or poet provides many benefits. One of the benefits of performing at open mics is the opportunity for performers to engage in networking. Novice performers are able to connect with seasoned performers who can offer advice on stage presence. These connections are also useful when it comes to organizing future appearances as well as collaborations. Another benefit to networking at open mics is the opportunity for exposure. Open mics offer attendees the opportunity to discover new and local talent. Performing in front of open mic attendees exposes a performer's material to people who have never heard it before. This allows attendees the opportunity to connect with a performer and share a performer's material with friends and family with similar taste. Experience is also another benefit for performers at open mics. Many performers at open mics are just beginning their career as performers or have been performing for years. Either way, performing at an open mic gives performers the opportunity to practice their stage presence and figure out the best way to perform their material that engages audiences.

== See also ==
- The Raving Poets (Canadian poetry event with live music, hosted from 2000–2010)
