= Cliff Bell's =

Jazz club in Detroit, Michigan, US

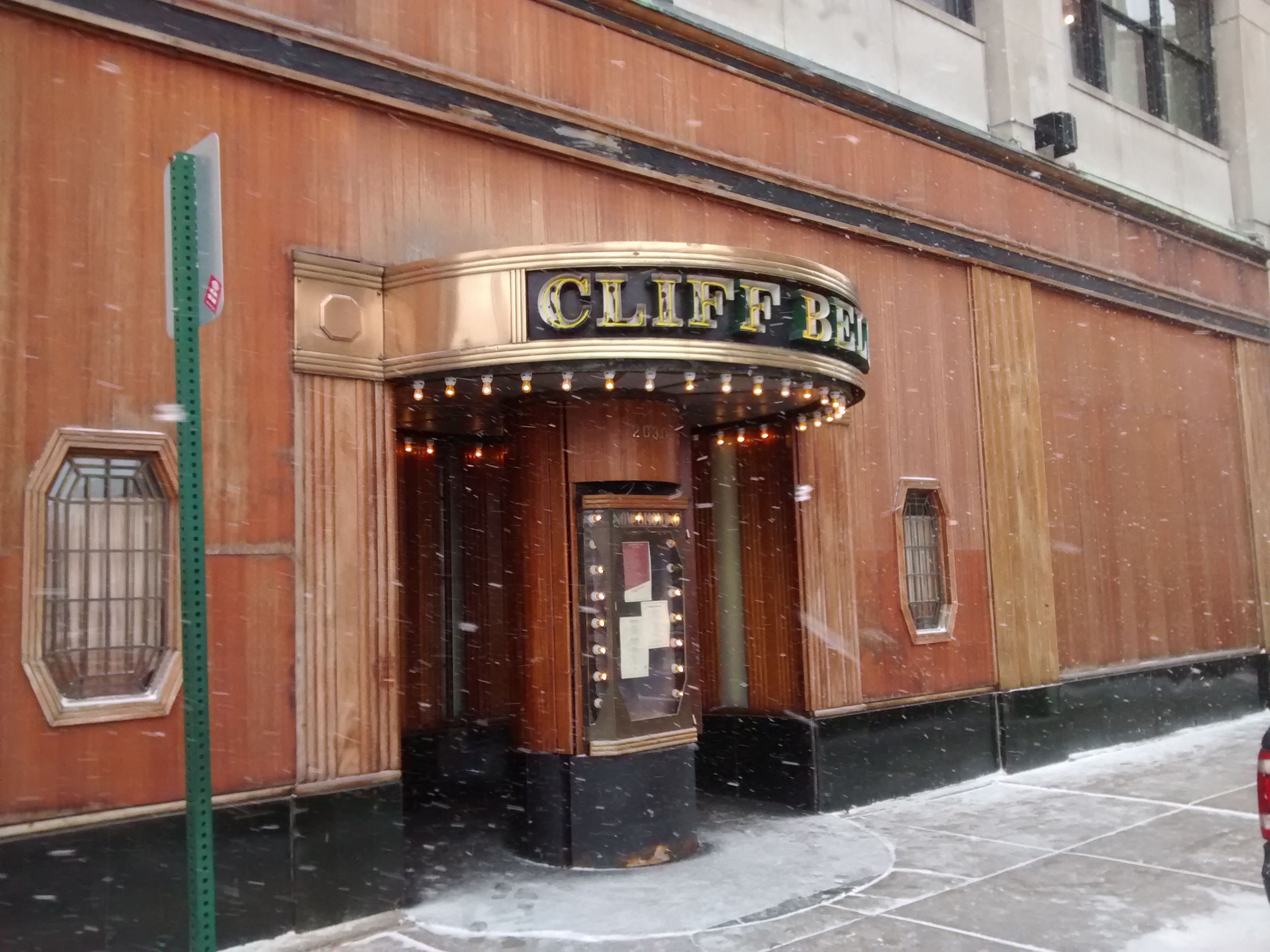
- Interactive map of Cliff Bell's
- Former names: Cliff Bell's (1935–1958), Winery, La Cave, AJ's on the Park, Cliff Bell's (2005–current)
- Location: Detroit, Michigan
- Coordinates: 42.3368°N 83.0527°W
- Type: Jazz club

Construction
- Groundbreaking: 1934
- Built: 1934
- Opened: 1935
- Renovated: 2006
- Closed: 1985

Website
- cliffbells.com

Cliff Bell's is a jazz club in Detroit, Michigan, which is located at 2030 Park Ave. It originally opened in 1935, and it is named after John Clifford Bell, an entrepreneur in Detroit in the 1930s. Notable artists such as Marcus Miller have performed at Cliff Bell's. Additionally, The Moth storytelling events are held monthly at Cliff Bell's.

It was used as a location in the movie The Ides of March, in a scene where Detroit musician Bob Mervak was briefly shown singing "We'll Meet Again." The entrance was also seen in the film Kill the Irishman, filming up Park Avenue.
