= Chris Tse (Canadian poet) =

Canadian poet

- Born: Christopher Samuel Tse; Vancouver, British Columbia, Canada
- Occupations: Poet and writer

Chris Tse (Chinese name: 謝聖文) is a Canadian spoken-word poet, educator, and author of Chinese descent. As a spoken word poet, he placed second at the 2011 Poetry Slam World Cup and 2016 Rio International Poetry Slam, and has shared the stage with Leanne Betasamosake Simpson, Shane Koyczan, and Mustafa the Poet. Tse's book A Song for the Paper Children, published in 2024, was written to commemorate the centenary of the Chinese Exclusion Act, and was performed in the Senate of Canada on June 23, 2023. The book was listed in The Canadian Chilstem's Book Centre list of best books for Kids & Teens in 2024. He is a sessional lecturer at the University of Victoria and Simmons University.

Born in Vancouver and raised in Coquitlam, British Columbia, Tse attended Carleton University in Ottawa where he received his bachelor's degree in journalism. He began performing spoken-word in his second year of his undergraduate studies. In 2009, he won the Vancouver poetry slam with his poem I'm Sorry I'm a Christian, and in the following year he won the Capital Slam championship in Ottawa. He went on to captain the Capital Slam team to victory in the national championship. Since then, he has performed across Canada, the United States, Europe, Asia, and Ghana in various slams as a featured poet. He has given performances twice with TED and has also made an appearance at SPEAKout. In 2011, Tse represented Canada at the Poetry Slam World Cup in Paris and won second place.

Besides spoken word, Tse has worked in Ghana as a human rights reporter with Journalists for Human Rights. He toured with the Kenyan Boys Choir as a former speaker for Me to We, before definitively resigning in 2016.

== Notable poems ==
- A Song for the Paper Children
- History of Silence
- Why I Never Wrote a Poem About My Mother
- Jobs
- I'm Sorry I'm a Christian
- Wake Up
- Sine Metu (for Jameson Whiskey)
- Eyes Open

== See also ==
- Slam poetry
