= Susie Arioli =

Canadian jazz singer

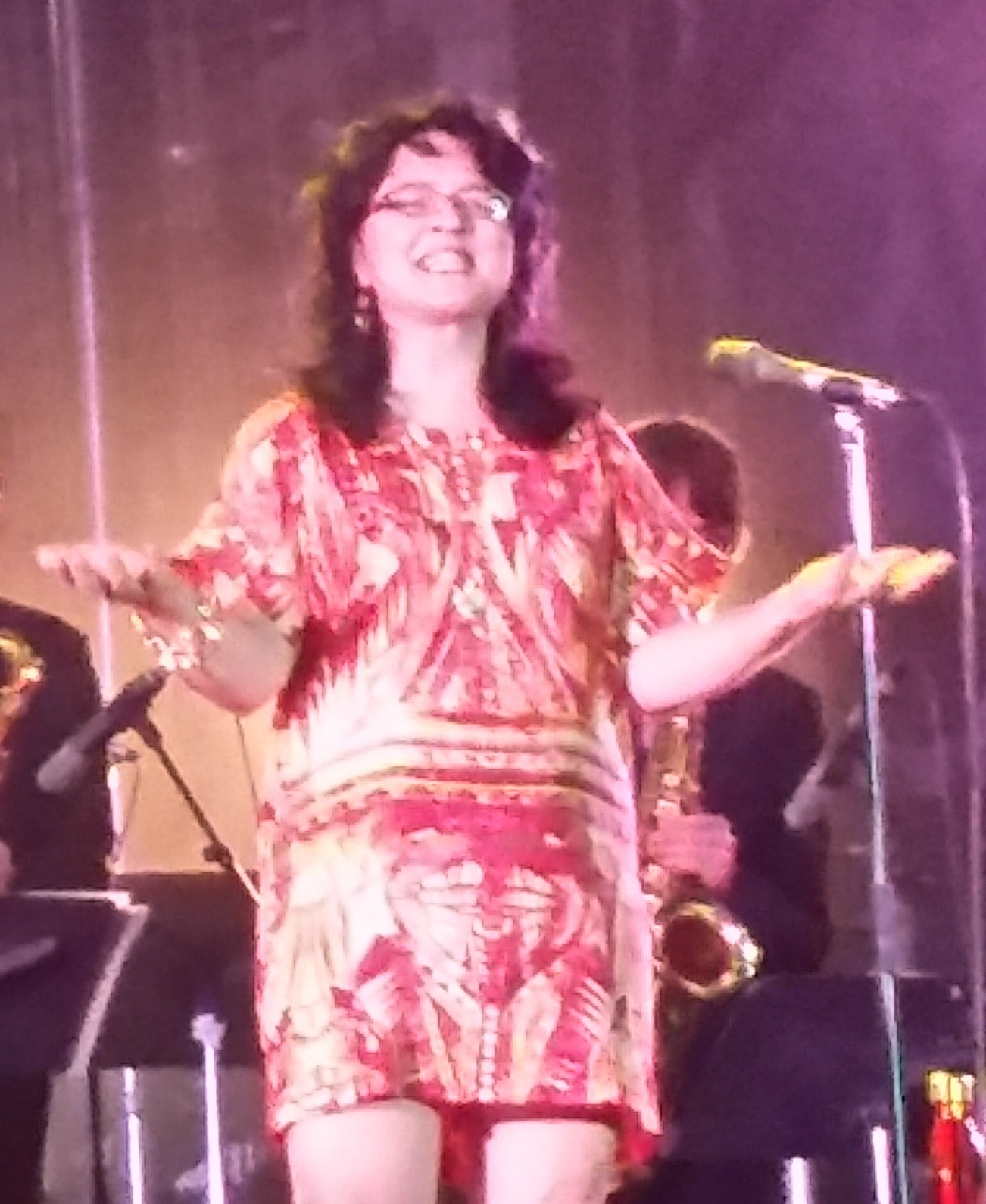
- International Jazz Festival of Montreal 2014 – Quarter des Spectacles Montreal Festival International de Jazz de Montréal

Background information
- Born: December 19, 1963 (age 62); Toronto, Ontario, Canada
- Genres: Jazz
- Occupation: Singer
- Years active: 1998–present
- Website: susiearioli.ca

Susie Arioli is a Canadian jazz singer.

== Career ==
Arioli grew up listening to Antônio Carlos Jobim, Stan Getz, The Beatles, Frank Sinatra and Billie Holiday, and both her parents sang. Her first ever performance as a young singer was at a community centre, where she went by the name Susie Vacation in a subtle reference to Billie Holiday, whose singing style she initially emulated before developing her own unique voice.

Arioli had been singing in jazz clubs in Montreal when she met guitarist Jordan Officer at a jam led by Stephen Barry. Together they started the Susie Arioli Band. Their first big opportunity came in 1998. After a successful outdoor show, they were asked by the Montreal International Jazz Festival to open for Ray Charles. The band's opening set got the attention of Montreal critics, and soon after it released the debut album, It's Wonderful.

Arioli has received several Juno nominations. Her second album, Pennies from Heaven, was the last recording of jazz pianist Ralph Sutton. Her third album, That's for Me, was produced by John Snyder. Her fourth album, Learn to Smile Again, was a departure and featured six songs by country songwriter Roger Miller. For the fifth album, Night Lights, she returned to jazz with a collection of standards. All of the albums featured guitarist Jordan Officer.

In an article in Atlantic Monthly, Arioli was recognized by jazz writer Francis Davis as an emerging jazz talent.

Arioli's father was the American writer, actor, and director Don Arioli.

== Discography ==
- It's Wonderful with Jordan Officer (Justin Time 2000)
- Pennies from Heaven with Jordan Officer (Justin Time, 2002)
- Susie Arioli Band with Jordan Officer (Recorded at Studio Victor, Montreal, 2003 with the support of the Canada Music Fund)
- That's for Me (Justin Time, 2004)
- Learn to Smile Again with Jordan Officer (Justin Time, 2005)
- Live at Montreal International Jazz Festival with Jordan Officer (Justin Time, 2007)
- Night Lights with Jordan Officer (Spectra, 2008)
- Christmas Dreaming with Jordan Officer (Spectra, 2010)
- All the Way (Spectra, 2012)
- Spring (Spectra, 2015)
- It's All Right With Me (2023)
