= Spoken Word Canada =

Canadian non-profit organization

Spoken Word Canada, also referred to as SpoCan, is an organization of spoken word performers and organizers. Formed from a committee of city representatives at the 2004 Canadian Spoken Wordlympics in Ottawa, Ontario, SpoCan's mission is to "nurture, develop and advance spoken word artists, the professional spoken word community and the art of spoken word in Canada." SpoCan is also responsible for producing the Canadian Festival of Spoken Word each fall.

The organization is governed by a board of directors composed of the national director, the past national director, members of the executive committee, three members-at-large, and two local representatives from each of the sixteen communities represented on the board: Victoria, Vancouver, Calgary, Edmonton, Saskatoon, Winnipeg, London, Guelph, Kitchener-Waterloo, Burlington, Toronto, Peterborough, Lanark County, Ottawa, Montreal, and Halifax. According to SpoCan's bylaws, new cities can be added to the SpoCan Board when "at least one arts organization and/or performance series from that city formally agrees to participate in SpoCan. The addition of representation from a new city must be ratified by a majority vote of the Board."

Individuals can also become members of SpoCan by registering with the national director.

SpoCan has operated its national festival in each of the past seven years—in 2004 as the Canadian Spoken Wordlympics (in Ottawa), and from 2005 to 2019 as the Canadian Festival of Spoken Word (2005 in Vancouver, 2006 in Toronto, 2007 in Halifax, 2008 in Calgary, 2009 in Victoria and 2010 in Ottawa).

== See also ==
- Poetry slam
- Canadian poetry
