= Jordan Officer =

Canadian guitarist (born 1976)

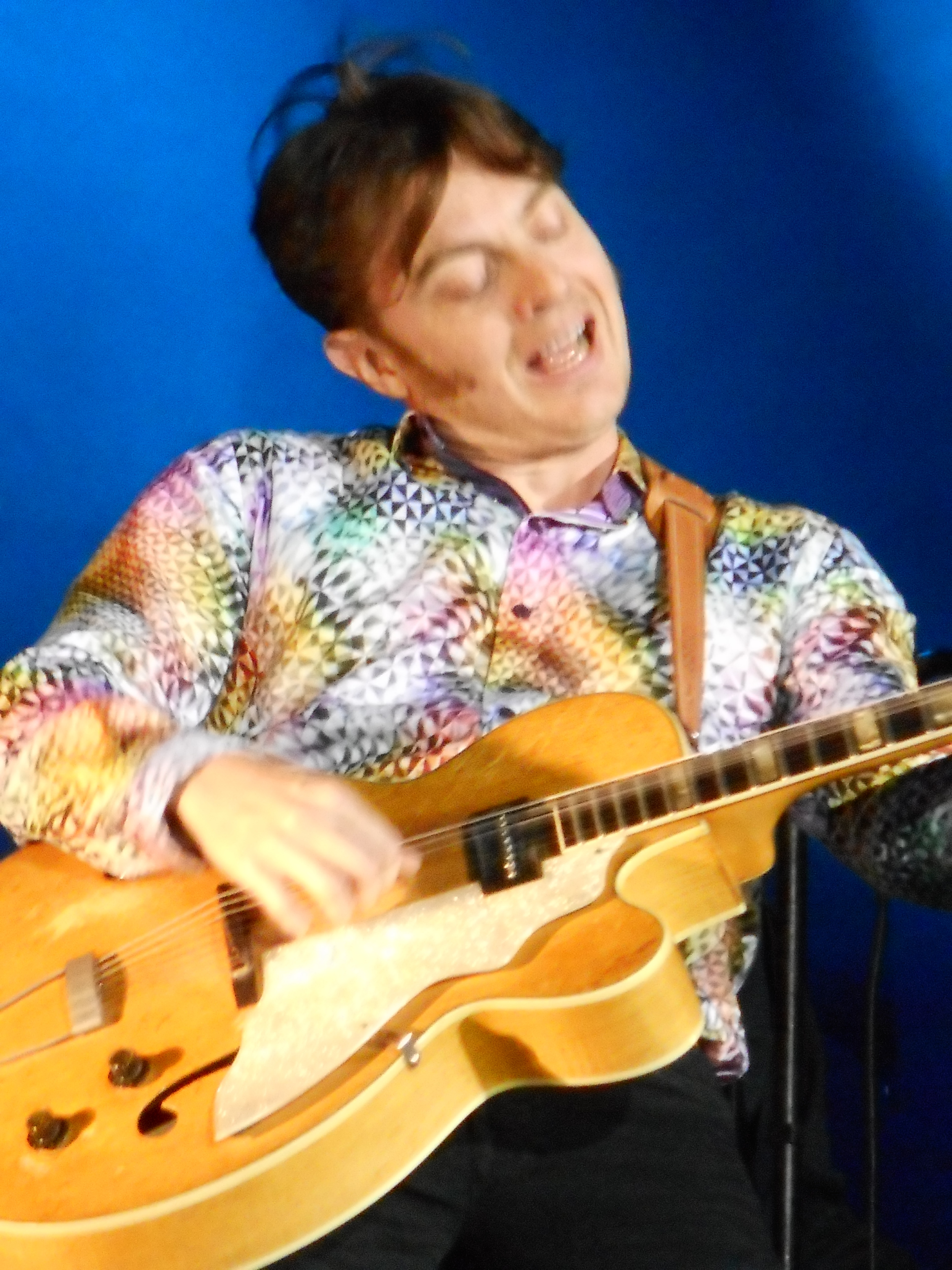
- Jordan Officer, 2016

Background information
- Born: November 29, 1976 (age 49); Montreal, Quebec
- Genres: Jazz, blues, country
- Occupation: Musician
- Instrument: Guitar
- Label: Justin Time
- Website: www.jordanofficer.com

Jordan Officer (born 1976) is a Canadian guitarist who plays jazz, blues, and country music. He has worked often with singer Susie Arioli, as well as releasing music as a solo artist.

Officer was born in Montreal. He played violin and drums before taking up guitar at the age of fourteen. He performed with blues bands in clubs, which is how he met Susie Arioli, a Canadian jazz singer who also plays snare drum. In 1997, they added a bassist and formed a trio which performed in bars and clubs. During the following year, they opened for Ray Charles at the Montreal Jazz Festival. Officer cites Charlie Christian as an influence and has a particular fondness for the swing era. He has played mandolin with opera singer Nils Brown and has worked with blues musician Stephen Barry.

In 2024 he released the album Like Never Before, which included collaborations with Martha Wainwright, Ariane Moffatt and Brad Barr.

== Discography ==
- Jordan Officer (Spectra, 2010)
- Victor Sessions (2013)
- Blue Skies (2014)
- I'm Free (2015)
- Three Rivers (Spectra, 2018)
- Like Never Before (2024)

With Susie Arioli

- It's Wonderful (Justin Time, 2001)
- Pennies from Heaven (Justin Time, 2001)
- That's for Me (Justin Time, 2004)
- Learn to Smile Again (Justin Time, 2005)
- Live at the Montreal International Jazz Festival (Justin Time, 2007)
- Christmas Dreaming (Spectra, 2010)
- All the Way (2012)
