= Sheri-D Wilson =

Canadian poet

- Occupations: poet, educator, speaker, producer
- Writing career
- Movements: Dada, Surrealism, Spoken word
- Website: www.sheridwilson.com

Sheri-D Wilson, CM D. Litt, (also known as "The Mama of Dada") is a Canadian poet, performer, educator, speaker, and producer. She is the author of fourteen books, four short films, three plays, and four poetry & music albums.

Sheri-D's latest work, THE ONEIRONAUT∅1, was published in 2024 by Write Bloody North. It is the first volume in a three-book one-story trilogy of speculative poetry, which explores extreme lucid dreaming, dream healing, and a call for a change in a dystopian regime.

== Awards and honors ==
In 2019 Sheri-D was appointed to the Order of Canada for her contributions as a spoken word poet and community leadership.

- City of Calgary Arts Award (2015)
- Poet Laureate Emeritus of Calgary (2018-2022)
- Doctor of Letters—Honoris Causa from Kwantlen University (2017)
- City of Calgary Arts Award (2015)
- CBC Top 10 Poets in Canada (2013, 2009)
- ffwd Readers’ Choice Award—Best Poet (2007-2012)
- Stephan G. Stephansson Award for Poetry (2006)
- Woman of Vision (2006)
- 2005 SpoCan Poet of Honour
- USA Heavyweight Title - Bumbershoot (2003)
- CBC Face-off (2002)
- Confessions, a jazz play, 5 Jessie Nominations (Vancouver, 1991)

== Books ==
- The ONEIRONAUT (2024, Write Bloody North)
- A Love Letter to Emily C (2019, Frontenac House)
- The Book of Sensations (2017, U of C Press)
- Open Letter: Woman Against Violence Against Women (2014, Frontenac House)
- Goddess Gone Fishing for a Map of the Universe (2012, Frontenac House)
- Autopsy of a Turvy World (2008, Frontenac House)
- Re: Zoom (2005, Frontenac) Winner: 2006 Stephan G. Stephansson Poetry Award
- Between Lovers (2002, Arsenal Pulp Press)
- The Sweet Taste of Lightning (1998, Arsenal Pulp Press)
- Girl’s Guide to Giving Head (1996, Arsenal Pulp Press)
- Swerve (1993, Arsenal Pulp Press)
- Bull’s Whip & Lamb’s Wool (1989, Petarade Press)

=== Editor ===
- YYC POP: Portraits of People (2020, Frontenac House Press)
- Spoken Word Workbook: Inspiration from Poets who Teach (2011, Banff Centre Press)

=== CDs ===
- Dragon Rouge (2017)
- Sweet Taste of Lightning
- Re:Cord

== Community work ==
A strong advocate for social change and community building in Sheri-D Wilson founded The Spoken Word Program at The Banff Centre for Arts and Creativity. She was director and faculty of that program (2005-2012). At which time Tanya Evanson took over as director of the program. Sheri-D Wilson also edited The Spoken Word Workbook: Inspiration from Poets who Teach in 2011 (CSWS/BCP), an educational tool for teaching and writing Spoken Word.

In 2012, she was featured in Chatelaine Magazine, in a story about the creative mind. A regular on CBC, In 2013, she was interviewed by Canadian icon Sheilah Rogers. In 2011 she was honored to be presented by The National Slam of Canada in “Legends of Spoken Word.” In 2009 CBC called her one of the Top 10 Poets in Canada. In 2003 she won the USA Heavyweight title for poetry, and in 2006 The National Slam of Canada presented her with the Poet of Honour Award. Of the beat tradition, in 1989 Sheri-D studied at Naropa University’s Jack Kerouac School of Disembodied Poetics, in Boulder, Colorado.

Her influences include Guillaume Apollinaire, T.S. Eliot, Diane di Prima, Anne Waldman and Allen Ginsberg.

- Founded/ Artistic Director - Calgary Spoken Word Festival (2003-2024)
- La Directrice Artistique - School of Thought: Languages Lost & Found (2016)
- Founded/ Directed - The Spoken Word Program @ The Banff Centre (2005-2012)
- Produced - The National Slam of Canada (SpoCan) 2008
- Co-founded and organized the Vancouver Small Press Festival 1988-1990
- Co-founded and organized The Commercial Street Art Festival 1988-1990

== Reading highlights ==
- Write Bloody North (2020, On-Line)
- JazzYYC with Quincy Troupe (2019, Calgary)
- The Blues Festival (special event) with Sheila Jordan (2018, 2020, Calgary)
- New—New Year’s Eve Poem @ Olympic Plaza (2019, Calgary)
- Denman Island Readers & Writers Festival (2018, Denman Island)
- Live at the Bolt—Shadbolt Gallery (2018, Burnaby BC)
- Marvellous Urbanities, Surrealist Poetry Night (2018, Toronto)
- Wordspell (2018, Toronto)
- Kerouac Vigo International Festival (2017, Vigo, Spain)
- When Words Collide (2017, Victoria)
- League of Canadian Poets AGM (2017, Toronto)
- Saskatchewan Festival of Words (2017, Moose Jaw)
- Word on the Lake (2017, Salmon Arm)
- Yukon Writers Festival (2017, Whitehorse)
- Women’s March on Washington (2017, Calgary)
- Word on the Street (2015, Saskatoon)
- Sunshine Coast Festival of the Written Arts (2015, Sechelt)
- Verses Fest (2015, Ottawa)
- Women’s Rape Centre Montreal Memorial (2014, Vancouver)
- llega Spoken Orality (2014, Barcelona)
- National Slam Feature (2014, Victoria)
- VI Festival de Poesía las Lenguas de América (2014, Mexico City)
- Feature Guest, The Emerald Awards - Performer 2014 (Calgary)
- Verses Poetry Festival (Feature) 2014(Vancouver)
- WordFest 2012 (Calgary)
- V125PC 2011 (Vancouver)
- National Slam-Legends of Spoken Word 2011 (Toronto)
- Vancouver International Writers Festival '11,'02,'00,'95,'93,'90 (Vancouver)
- Maple Stirrup en El Arco de la virgin 2010 (Barcelona)
- Art 4 Change 2010 (Harlem)
- Festival maelstrÖm reEvolution 2010 (Brussels)
- Blue Met 2009 (Montreal)
- Voix d'Amériques 2008, 2005 (Montreal)
- The Raving Poets 2004 (Edmonton)
- Bumbershoot 2003, 1999, 1992, 1991, 1989 (Seattle)
- The World Poetry Bout 2002 (Taos, New Mexico)
- Poetry Africa 2001 (South Africa)
- WordFest 2008, 2000, ’95 (Calgary; Banff)
- Harbourfront Reading Series 1993 (Toronto)
- Small Press Festival 1990 (New York City)

== Other highlights ==
- Women and Words, 2003-2012 (instructor)
- First Time Eyes: Unearthing Spoken Word, 2007 essay (Canadian Theatre Review)
- Heart of a Poet, 2006, featured poet documentary series
- Bowery Project, 2005 (Instructor), Alberta Scene, 2005 (a commemoration of Alberta's centennial)
- Human Rights Symposium 2005: Victoria
- Sounds Like Canada, 2002 CBC Poet in Residence
- Addicted: Notes From The Belly Of The Beast, 2001 essay entitled Blackout
- Confessions a Jazz Play, 1991 text of play (Theatrum)
