= Jessia discography =

- EPs: 3
- Singles: 16
- Music videos: 7

The Canadian singer-songwriter Jessia has released two extended plays, sixteen singles, and seventeen music videos. She was a graduate of the music program at MacEwan University before starting her musical career. Harling would release "I'm Not Pretty" as a TikTok video in early 2021, and signed to Republic Records soon afterward. She won the Juno Award for Breakthrough Artist of the Year at the Juno Awards of 2022, and was nominated for Single of the Year for "I'm Not Pretty", Pop Album of the Year for How Are You? and the Fan Choice Award. "I'm Not Pretty" was certified gold by Recording Industry Association of America (RIAA) in April 2022.

== Extended plays ==
Title	EP details
How Are You?	Released: October 15, 2021; Label: Republic; Format: Digital download
Okay with Every Part	Released: July 19, 2024; Label: Jessia Music Inc.; Format: Digital download

== Singles ==
=== As lead artist ===
List of singles as lead artist, showing selected chart positions, certifications, and associated albums
Title	Year	Peak chart positions					Certifications	Album
Title	Year	CAN	CAN AC	CAN CHR	CAN HAC	AUT	Certifications	Album
"Tell Me"	2020	—	—	—	—	—		Non-album single
"Conviction"	2020	—	—	—	—	—		Non-album single
"Really Nice to Think About"	2020	—	—	—	—	—		Non-album single
"I'm Not Pretty"	2021	—	—	—	—	—		Non-album single
"I'm Not Pretty" (original or featuring Bebe Rexha)	2021	22	11	7	5	64	RIAA: Gold; MC: 2x Platinum	How Are You?
"I Should Quit"	2021	—	—	—	—	—		Non-album single
"First Call"	2021	—	—	—	—	—		How Are You?
"But I Don't"	2021	—	—	43	—	—		How Are You?
"Next Time"	2022	—	—	—	—	—		Non-album singles
"One of the Guys"	2022	—	—	45	—	—		Non-album singles
"Nobody Hates You"	2023	—	—	—	—	—		Non-album singles
"Serotonin"	2023	—	—	—	—	—		Non-album singles
"Without You"	2023	—	—	—	—	—		Non-album singles
"He's a 10"	2023	—	—	—	—	—		Okay with Every Part
"Somehow"	2023	—	—	—	—	—		Non-album singles
"One Before the One"	2023	—	—	—	—	—		Non-album singles
"Care About Me"	2024	—	—	—	—	—		Okay with Every Part
"The Woman You Are"	2024	—	—	—	—	—		Okay with Every Part
"Different People"	2024	—	—	—	—	—		Okay with Every Part
"I'm Not Gonna Cry"	2024	—	—	—	—	—		Non-album singles
"Moved Around You"	2025	—	—	—	—	—		Non-album singles
"Therapy & Yoga"	2025	—	—	—	—	—		Non-album singles
"Let Him"	2026	—	—	—	—	—		Non-album singles
"—" denotes a single that did not chart or was not released in that territory.

== Music videos ==
List of music videos, showing year released and director
Title	Year	Director(s)	Ref.
"I'm Not Pretty"	2021	Benjamin Lussier	
"Without You"	2023	Brittany Berggren	
