= 2018 iHeartRadio MMVAs =

- Date: August 26, 2018
- Location: 299 Queen Street West, Toronto, Ontario, Canada
- Country: Canada
- Hosted by: Awkwafina

Highlights
- Most awards: Shawn Mendes (4)
- Most nominations: Shawn Mendes (8)
- Website: http://mmva.muchmusic.com

Television/radio coverage
- Network: CTV, Much, MTV

The 2018 iHeartRadio MMVAs were held on August 26, 2018 outside 299 Queen Street West in Toronto, Ontario, Canada. Unlike previous years, the 2018 show aired live at the end of August instead of Father's Day. It was hosted by Awkwafina.

== Performances ==
Artist(s)	Song(s)
Pre-show
Elijah Woods x Jamie Fine	"Ain't Easy"
Tyler Shaw	"With You"
Main show
Shawn Mendes	"Lost in Japan"
Meghan Trainor	"No Excuses" "Let You Be Right"
Halsey	"Sorry" "Bad at Love"
Bülow	"Not a Love Song"
Alessia Cara	"Growing Pains"
Bebe Rexha; Brett Kissel	"I'm a Mess" (Rexha) "Meant to Be"
98 Degrees	"Because of You" "The Hardest Thing" "Give Me Just One Night (Una Noche)" (medley)
Kris Wu	"18" "Like That" "Deserve"
5 Seconds of Summer	"Youngblood"
Marshmello; Anne-Marie	"Friends" "2002" (Anne-Marie)
The Beaches	"T-Shirt"
Shawn Mendes	"In My Blood"

Loud Luxury served as DJ for the show.

== Presenters ==
- Tyra Banks – presented Best Collaboration
- Sonequa Martin-Green – introduced Halsey
- Prince Michael Jackson – introduced Bülow
- Tyler Shaw – presented Song of the Summer
- Derek Hough – presented Best EDM/Dance Artist or Group
- New City – introduced Alessia Cara
- Chrissy Metz – introduced 98 Degrees
- Ashlee Simpson and Evan Ross – presented Best Pop Artist or Group
- The Reklaws – introduced Kris Wu
- JWoww and Kristin Cavallari – introduced 5 Seconds of Summer
- Sofi Tukker – presented Fan Fave Video and Fan Fave Artist
- Gus Kenworthy and Madison Beer – introduced Marshmello and Anne-Marie
- Scott Helman and Francesco Yates – presented Artist of the Year
- Jus Reign and Craig McMorris – introduced The Beaches
- Alexandra Shipp and Colton Haynes – presented Video of the Year

== Winners and nominees ==
Nominees were announced on August 1, 2018. For the nominations, most awards categories were changed from being video-oriented to artist-oriented. Two new categories were also introduced: Song of the Summer and Best Collaboration. Shawn Mendes has the most nominations with eight, with Drake behind at seven. Winners were announced on August 26, 2018.

=== Video of the Year ===
Logic (featuring Alessia Cara and Khalid) – "1-800-273-8255"

- Shawn Mendes — "In My Blood"
- Halsey — "Bad at Love"
- Drake — "God's Plan"
- Childish Gambino — "This Is America"
- Ariana Grande — "No Tears Left to Cry"

=== Best EDM/Dance Artist or Group ===
Marshmello ^{A}

- Sofi Tukker
- Loud Luxury
- Calvin Harris
- Zedd
- Kygo

=== Best Director ===
Drake — "God's Plan" (Director: Karena Evans)

- Shawn Mendes — "In My Blood" (Director: Jay Martin)
- Drake — "Nice for What" (Director: Karena Evans)
- Childish Gambino — "This Is America" (Director: Hiro Murai)
- Justin Timberlake (featuring Chris Stapleton) — "Say Something" (Director: Arturo Perez Jr.)
- The Carters — "Apeshit" (Director: Ricky Saix)

=== Best Pop Artist or Group ===
Shawn Mendes

- Meghan Trainor
- Halsey
- Alessia Cara
- Ed Sheeran
- Camila Cabello

=== Best Rock/Alternative Artist or Group ===
Imagine Dragons

- Chvrches
- Portugal. The Man
- Foo Fighters
- Arcade Fire
- Arkells

=== Best Hip Hop Artist or Group ===
Drake

- The Carters
- Post Malone
- Cardi B
- Kendrick Lamar
- Childish Gambino

=== Best New Canadian Artist ===
Elijah Woods x Jamie Fine

- The Beaches
- Ralph
- New City
- Bülow
- Johnny Orlando

=== Artist of the Year ===
Shawn Mendes

- Ed Sheeran
- Cardi B
- Drake
- Camila Cabello
- Post Malone

=== Song of the Summer ===
Loud Luxury (featuring Brando) — "Body"

- Drake — "Nice for What"
- Cardi B, Bad Bunny and J Balvin — "I Like It"
- Zedd, Maren Morris and Grey — "The Middle"
- Marshmello and Anne-Marie — "Friends"
- Bebe Rexha (featuring Florida Georgia Line) — "Meant to Be"

=== Best Collaboration ===
- Kendrick Lamar (featuring SZA) — "All the Stars"
- Shawn Mendes (featuring Khalid) — "Youth"
- The Weeknd and Kendrick Lamar — "Pray for Me"
- Bebe Rexha (featuring Florida Georgia Line — "Meant to Be"
- Zedd, Maren Morris and Grey — "The Middle"
- Marshmello and Anne-Marie — "Friends"

=== Fan Fave Video ===
Shawn Mendes — "In My Blood"

- Drake — "God's Plan"
- Childish Gambino — "This Is America"
- The Carters — "Apeshit"
- Logic (featuring Alessia Cara and Khalid) – "1-800-273-8255"
- Alessia Cara – "Growing Pains"

=== Fan Fave Artist ===
Shawn Mendes

- Ed Sheeran
- Taylor Swift
- Camila Cabello
- Halsey
- Alessia Cara

=== Fan Fave Duo or Group ===
BTS

- Imagine Dragons
- Maroon 5
- Sofi Tukker
- The Chainsmokers
- 5 Seconds of Summer

=== Fan Fave Single ===
Selena Gomez and Marshmello — "Wolves"

- Ariana Grande — "No Tears Left to Cry"
- Post Malone (featuring 21 Savage) — "Rockstar"
- Shawn Mendes — "In My Blood"
- Camila Cabello — "Havana"
- Ed Sheeran — "Perfect"

=== Fan Fave New Artist ===
Kris Wu

- Hayley Kiyoko
- Cardi B
- Billie Eilish
- Why Don't We
- Dua Lipa

=== Fan Fave Much Creator ===
TheDanocracy (Dan Rodo)

- The Baker Twins (Shannon Baker and Shauna Baker)
- The Mike On Much Podcast (Mike Veerman, Max Kerman and Shane Cunningham)
- SneakerTalk (Christian Cantelon)
- Jaclyn Forbes
- Candage Leca

==== Notes ====
A Marshmello shocks MMVAs crowd by revealing is Shawn Mendes.
