= Elijah Woods x Jamie Fine =

Canadian pop music duo

- Origin: Ottawa, Ontario, Canada
- Genre: Electropop
- Years active: 2014–2020
- Label: Big Machine
- Past members: Elijah Woods; Jamie Fine
- Website: http://www.ewxjf.com/

Elijah Woods x Jamie Fine (pronounced Elijah Woods "ex" Jamie Fine) were a Canadian pop music duo that consisted of songwriter and producer Elijah Woods and singer-songwriter Jamie Fine. The duo first emerged as winning contestants on the first season of Canadian reality music competition, The Launch, and released the single "Ain't Easy" through Big Machine Records, which became certified Double Platinum by Music Canada and topped the national adult contemporary airplay chart. The group became the best-selling artists of the show, experiencing three subsequent gold-certified singles and receiving several awards and nominations, including Best New Canadian Artist or Group at the 2018 iHeartRadio MMVAs.

Following a four year tenure with Big Machine Records, it was reported in November 2020 that Jamie Fine and Elijah Woods had mutually parted ways, both opting to pursue individual solo careers. Since their split, both artists have seen individual prominence and chart success, and have both released singles that have entered the Canadian Hot 100.

== History ==
=== 2014–2017: Beginnings and The Launch ===
Elijah was born and raised outside of Perth, Ontario. His mother owned the town's Sunflower Bakery and his father taught him to play guitar. Woods began producing music at the age of 7. He attended the music industry arts program at Algonquin College until his graduation in 2015. Jamie was born and raised in the Centrepointe area of Ottawa. She was introduced to jazz and classical music by her parents, but did not begin singing until the age of 6, and only began performing in high school. Fine has graduated from the culinary arts program at Algonquin and has put her culinary career on hold to pursue music. Prior to their appearance on The Launch, Woods claims the two had been honing their craft as their own independent artists for upwards of ten years.

The duo of Elijah Woods and Jamie Fine was formed sometime in early 2014 when the two met at Algonquin College in Ottawa, Ontario, Canada. After Woods, who was enrolled at the time in the college's music program, heard a recording of Fine's voice on a friend's smartphone singing an original song titled "Falling Down", he was inspired to reach out to the singer to collaborate on music. They worked together for two or three years before releasing a string of digital singles in 2017, including "Serenade", which charted at number 48 on the national Canada CHR/Top 40 airplay chart.

In September 2017, the duo competed on the first season of Canadian reality music competition, The Launch. The series' second episode, which aired in January 2018, featured a handful of unsigned musical acts including Elijah Woods x Jamie Fine competing to have their version of the Ryan Tedder and Camila Cabello-written song, "Ain't Easy", released nationwide through Big Machine Records. After being selected as the winner, the duo's rendition of the song was released January 17, 2018. The song is the only coronation single from the series to reach the Canadian Hot 100, where "Ain't Easy" peaked at number 38, and went on to reach #1 on the Canadian adult contemporary airplay chart in July 2018. Music Canada certified the single Platinum in May 2018, and became Double Platinum in February 2019. The success of the song contributed to the duo winning the iHeartRadio MMVA for Best New Canadian Artist or Group in August 2018. It is the lead single from their debut EP 8:47.

Discussing the ups and downs of their appearance on the show and their subsequent launch into stardom with "Ain't Easy", described as catchy-as-heck and ubiquitous to Canadian radio stations, the two made clear in an interview with iHeartRadio in Montreal, Quebec, that they were both equally grateful for the experience. Woods elaborated that, "very few people get to experience [this] – it's so rare that you get to do all these things as a musician and we're just trying to soak that up as much as possible." The pair also discussed the awkwardness keeping their big break secret, their instant fascination with the "Ain't Easy" demo, branching out into American markets, and interacting with fans on social media. They also illustrated the tensions behind the scenes of balancing creative liberties with the song while on The Launch. Addressing taking on the star-penned track for themselves, Fine confessed, "When you read 'a Ryan Tedder, Camila Cabello song,' it's like, hang on a second, it's ours too – because we're writers first. That's the part of this that's most important to us. There were a few comments along the lines of 'They're not real artists. They can just sing.' – but with that it's like, OK I guess we'll show them on the next single." Woods additionally joked about the experience as him becoming "the first person to win a singing competition without ever opening [their] mouth."

=== 2017–2020: 8:47 and disbandment ===
Elijah Woods x Jamie Fine followed their 2017 television appearance by entering the new year working on new music under their partnership with Big Machine Records. Discussion of their debut EP first emerged in June 2018 when the duo told iHeartRadio that an album was likely "[not] too far off", citing that they had prepared and produced over two album's worth of music for the opportunity. The duo released their second major-label single, "Better Off", on August 24, 2018, the second single from the 8:47 EP. It has since become their second consecutive charting single on the Canadian Hot 100. The EP's third single, "You", was released on February 14, 2019, the same day the EP went out for pre-order. The EP was released on March 8, 2019.

Following a four year tenure with Big Machine Records, it was reported in November 2020 that Jamie Fine and Elijah Woods had parted ways, both opting to pursue individual solo careers. In an exclusive interview with iHeartRadio with Jamie Fine, she cited creative differences that were mutually agreed upon between herself and Woods, claiming the two saw different creative perspectives to their collaboration, and that there were no hard feelings in splitting. Fine explained that the two looked at their trajectories as artists and saw each other in different creative lights, claiming, "It's just in terms of the brand, it's how we look, it's the artists that we want to be – that's where we really differ[ed]."

== Post-split ventures ==
=== Elijah Woods ===
Elijah Woods
- Born: February 28, 1994 (age 32); Perth, Ontario, Canada
- Genre: Pop
- Occupation: Singer-songwriter
- Instruments: Vocals; piano
- Years active: 2021–present
- Label: Demos.wav Music Group
- Website: https://elijahwoods.com/

After splitting from the pairing, Woods found himself in familiar footing by establishing roots in music production. He found himself gaining quick industry notoriety right out of the gate in 2020 for producing the viral hit "I'm Not Pretty" by Jessia, which went on to become platinum certified by Music Canada, and peaked on the Canadian Hot 100 at number 22. He would go on to produce and co-write the entirety of Jessia's six-track EP How Are You? with Jessia, and has continued collaborating with her as producer ever since.

In March 2020, Woods took his solo career to new heights when he began his own Ottawa-based record label Demos.wav Music Group. He took the opportunity to emerge as a performer and vocalist for his own self-written tracks, and began work on his debut EP under his independent label. He released his first single "Lights" in January 2021 to widespread appeal, eventually gaining significant national recognition and chart certification. The single peaked on the Canadian Hot 100 at number 47, and became certified gold by Music Canada the following December. Discussing the track with iHeartRadio, hinting at his future EP, he penned in a note that he "cannot wait to share the next chapter" with fans.

His debut EP, Look What I Made, would eventually find its release in October 2021, featuring six tracks written and produced by Woods himself, including a performance between him and frequent collaborator Jessia on the track "First Night". He joined Dean Lewis as a supporting act on the Canadian dates for his The Future Is Bright world tour during May 2023.

His list of production credits extends to artists including Jessia, Jutes, 12AM, J-Soul, Aria Ohlsson, Always Never, will hyde, Adrian Mitchel, Ann@lise, Drawn to the Sky, KnownByAlex, lael, Melissa Kadas, Nick Bateman, and Uptown Boyband, as well as his former creative partner in Fine.

=== Jamie Fine ===
Jamie Fine
- Born: July 7, 1993 (age 33); Ottawa, Ontario, Canada
- Genre: Pop
- Occupation: Singer-songwriter
- Instrument: Vocals
- Years active: 2020–present
- Label: Universal Music Canada
- Website: https://www.jamiefinemusic.com/

As a solo artist, Jamie made her solo debut with her track "Sellout", a raw confessional about reflecting on her experiences in the mainstream and the pressures put upon her by the industry, which was cowritten and produced by Woods. She later collaborated in 2021 with Winnipeg-native DJ Takis and internet musician Brandyn Burnette on the track "All Time". The track emerged onto Canadian radio, peaking at number 27 on the Canadian CHR chart.

Fine would take a small break from music, before re-emerging strong in May 2022 with the announcement that she had signed to Universal Music Canada as a solo artist. The same day, she released her debut single with the label "Confessions", an emotionally charged single about beginning new chapters. The song was produced with her longtime collaborator Bynon, who would go on to produce her entire six-track EP. Fine would see gradual but eventual chart recognition with the release of her third 2022 single "Hate Me Love Me", a track she described as "the perfect get over your psycho ex song." The song has been quoted as one of her more light-hearted tracks despite its subject matter, touching on toxic relationships and how people are better off removing them from their lives. The single was released in July 2022, with a music video released the following Wednesday. The track attracted instant yet gradual radio appeal, emerging on the Canada CHR/Top 40 charts in its 'New And Active' list for several weeks, before finally emerging among its Top 50 and peaking at #48 in October 2022. On November 4, 2022, her six-track EP, Eight Gardengate, was released, featuring her four promotional singles, a fifth track, and a collaboration with Quebec-born singer-songwriter Alicia Moffet.

In 2023, Fine saw her hard work recognized with her single "If Anything's Left", and finally marked a return to the Canadian Hot 100 with the song entering the chart in April 2023, her first appearance on the chart in three years and first instance as a solo artist, thanks in part to a TikTok campaign that saw teasers for the track accumulate over 7.8 million views prior to the song's release. The song reached a peak of number 37, narrowly beating out her former peak high set with "Ain't Easy" back in 2018. Internationally, the song also saw an unusually high interest from South African listeners, peaking on the country's Billboard chart at #11 on the week of August 5, 2023. Discussing the song, Fine described the song as being about "celebrating my happiness, probably for the first time ever," and how thrilled she was to pen the song with writer Dani Poppitt and long-time collaborator Bynon. She also participated in an all-star recording of Serena Ryder's single "What I Wouldn't Do", which was released as a charity single to benefit Kids Help Phone's Feel Out Loud campaign for youth mental health. She was the opening act at the CFL championship 110th Grey Cup.

== Personal lives ==
=== Elijah Woods ===
Elijah Matthew Woods is the founder and director of his independent label Demos.wav Music Group. He established himself on the social media app TikTok in 2020, and has been followed more than 1.2 million times. His content includes behind the scenes looks into his music, as well as writing new verses for popular music using alternate narratives and perspectives to the lyrics. He is currently in a relationship with Canadian businesswoman and TikTok entertainment manager Hannah MacCrimmon.

=== Jamie Fine ===
Jamie Fine is openly gay, and often topics same-sex relationships in her songs. However, in an interview with iHeartRadio, she described herself as not necessarily part of the LGBTQ community, citing a double standard tendency within the community for both individuality and social equality, opting instead to be a voice and advocate for all walks of life. In the interview, she elaborated on this by saying, "If you want to talk about if you're gay, or if you're struggling with your race, or struggling with your religion... [acceptance] should all be the same thing." In the same interview, she claimed she did not recognize her sexual affiliations until she was 18 years old. Since 2021, she has been in a relationship with Canadian model & TikTok star Victoria Sabovitch.

For artistic influences, Jamie cites musical group Black Eyed Peas and Canadian rock band Nickelback as inspirations, as well as American rapper and record producer J. Cole.

== Discography ==
=== As Elijah Woods x Jamie Fine ===
==== EPs ====
Title	Details	Peak position
Title	Details	CAN
8:47	Release date: March 8, 2019; Label: Big Machine	73

==== Singles ====
Title	Year	Peak chart positions				Certifications	Album
Title	Year	CAN	CAN AC	CAN CHR	CAN HAC	Certifications	Album
"Serenade"	2017	—	—	48	—		Non-album singles
"Catchin Feels"	2017	—	—	—	—		Non-album singles
"Ain't Easy"	2018	38	1	6	5	MC: 2× Platinum	8:47
"Better Off"	2018	69	—	12	26	MC: Gold	8:47
"It's Me & You (This Christmas)"	2018	—	15	—	—		Non-album single
"You"	2019	91	6	16	7	MC: Gold	8:47
"I'm Yours"	2019	—	—	—	—		Non-album singles
"Want You Back"	2020	63	—	23	26	MC: Gold	Non-album singles
"—" denotes a recording that failed to chart or was not released to that format.

=== As solo artists ===
==== Elijah Woods ====
List of singles, with selected chart positions
Title	Year	Peak positions				Certifications	Album
Title	Year	CAN	CAN AC	CAN CHR	CAN HAC	Certifications	Album
"Lights"	2021	47	7	8	23	MC: Gold	Look What I Made
"Good Guys"	2021	—	—	—	—		Non-album single
"Take Care"	2021	—	—	—	—		Look What I Made
"Someone New"	2021	—	—	39	27		Look What I Made
"First Night" (with Jessia)	2021	—	—	—	—		Look What I Made
"Fingers Crossed"	2022	—	—	—	—		Non-album singles
"ILU"	2022	—	49	29	27		Non-album singles
"Everything Everywhere Always"	2022	—	—	—	—		What If It Was Great?
"Hayley." (with Will Hyde)	2022	—	—	—	—		Non-album singles
"The Way That We Started (Taylor)"	2022	—	—	—	—		Non-album singles
"Life After Life"	2023	—	—	—	—		Non-album singles
"Past Life"	2023	—	—	—	—		What If It Was Great?
"Make Believe"	2023	—	—	—	—		What If It Was Great?
"24/7, 365"	2023	—	—	—	—		Bright Orange Everglow
"Last Girl" (featuring MacKenzie Porter)	2023	—	—	—	—		Non-album single
"Losing a Friend"	2024	—	—	—	—		Silver Lining
"2 Thousand 10"	2024	—	—	37	—		Hey There Elijah
"Sunlight!"	2024	—	—	—	—		Hey There Elijah
"What It Means"	2024	—	—	—	—		Elijah Would!
"We Should Stick Together"	2024	—	—	—	—		Hey There Elijah
"Could You Love Me?"	2025	—	—	—	—		Can We Talk?
"Ghost on the Radio"	2025	—	—	—	—		Can We Talk?
"Slicked Back Hair"	2025	—	—	—	—		Can We Talk?
"I Miss You"	2025	—	—	—	—		Can We Talk?
"So Good"	2025	—	—	36	—		Can We Talk?
"—" denotes a recording that failed to chart or was not released to that format.

==== Jamie Fine ====
EPs

Title
Eight Gardengate
If This Is It...
Everything Led Me to You

Singles

List of singles, with selected chart positions
Title	Year	Peak positions						Certifications	Album
Title	Year	CAN	CAN AC	CAN CHR	CAN HAC	SA	US Bub.	Certifications	Album
"Sellout"	2020	—	—	— (Note: "Sellout" did not enter the Canada CHR/Top 40 chart, but appeared on its "Top 40 New And Active" list with 44 plays on the week of December 12, 2020)	—	—	—		Non-album singles
"All Time" (with Takis and Brandyn Burnette)	2021	—	48	27	28	—	—		Non-album singles
"Confessions"	2022	—	—	—	—	—	—		Eight Gardengate
"On My Own"	2022	—	—	—	—	—	—		Eight Gardengate
"Hate Me Love Me"	2022	—	—	48	—	—	—		Eight Gardengate
"Never Wanted This" (with Alicia Moffet)	2022	—	—	—	—	—	—		Eight Gardengate
"Talk Shit"	2023	—	—	—	—	—	—		Non-album single
"If Anything's Left"	2023	37	11	8	11	9	—	MC: Platinum; RISA: Platinum	If This Is It...
"Mistaken"	2023	—	—	—	—	—	—		If This Is It...
"There You Go"	2023	—	—	—	33	—	—		If This Is It...
"Bulletproof"	2023	—	—	—	—	—	—		If This Is It...
"Seconds Away"	2024	—	—	—	—	—	—		If This Is It...
"You're Like"	2024	79	9	—	8	—	—		If This Is It...
"Like I Do"	2024	—	—	—	—	—	—		Non-album singles
"Body" (with Shawn Desman)	2025	85	20	10	5	—	—		Non-album singles
"Wait Forever"	2025	—	—	—	—	—	—		Everything Led Me to You
"Homesick"	2025	53	12	13	7	—	—		Everything Led Me to You
"Mistletoe"	2025	—	—	—	—	—	19		Non-album single
"Made It to the Moon"	2026	—	—	—	—	—	—		Everything Led Me to You
"Cups of Coffee"	2026	—	—	30	—	—	—		Everything Led Me to You
"Good Things Come in Two's"	2026	—	—	—	—	—	—		Everything Led Me to You
"Waking Up OK"	2026	—	—	—	—	—	—		Non-album singles
"Made for This"	2026	—	—	—	—	—	—		Non-album singles
"—" denotes a recording that failed to chart or was not released to that format.

== Awards and nominations ==
=== Elijah Woods x Jamie Fine ===
Year	Association	Category	Nominee / work	Result
2018	iHeartRadio MMVAs	Best New Canadian Artist or Group	Elijah Woods x Jamie Fine	Won
2019	Juno Award	Juno Fan Choice Award	Elijah Woods x Jamie Fine	Nominated
2019	Juno Award	Breakthrough Group of the Year	Elijah Woods x Jamie Fine	Nominated
2020	Juno Award	Group of the Year	Elijah Woods x Jamie Fine	Nominated
2020	Juno Award	Pop Album of the Year	8:47	Nominated

=== Jamie Fine ===
Year	Association	Category	Nominee / work	Result
2023	MTV Europe Music Awards	Best Canadian Act	Jamie Fine	Nominated
2025	Juno Award	Pop Album of the Year	if this is it...	Nominated
