= Kimmortal =

Queer Filipino-Canadian musician, songwriter and visual artist

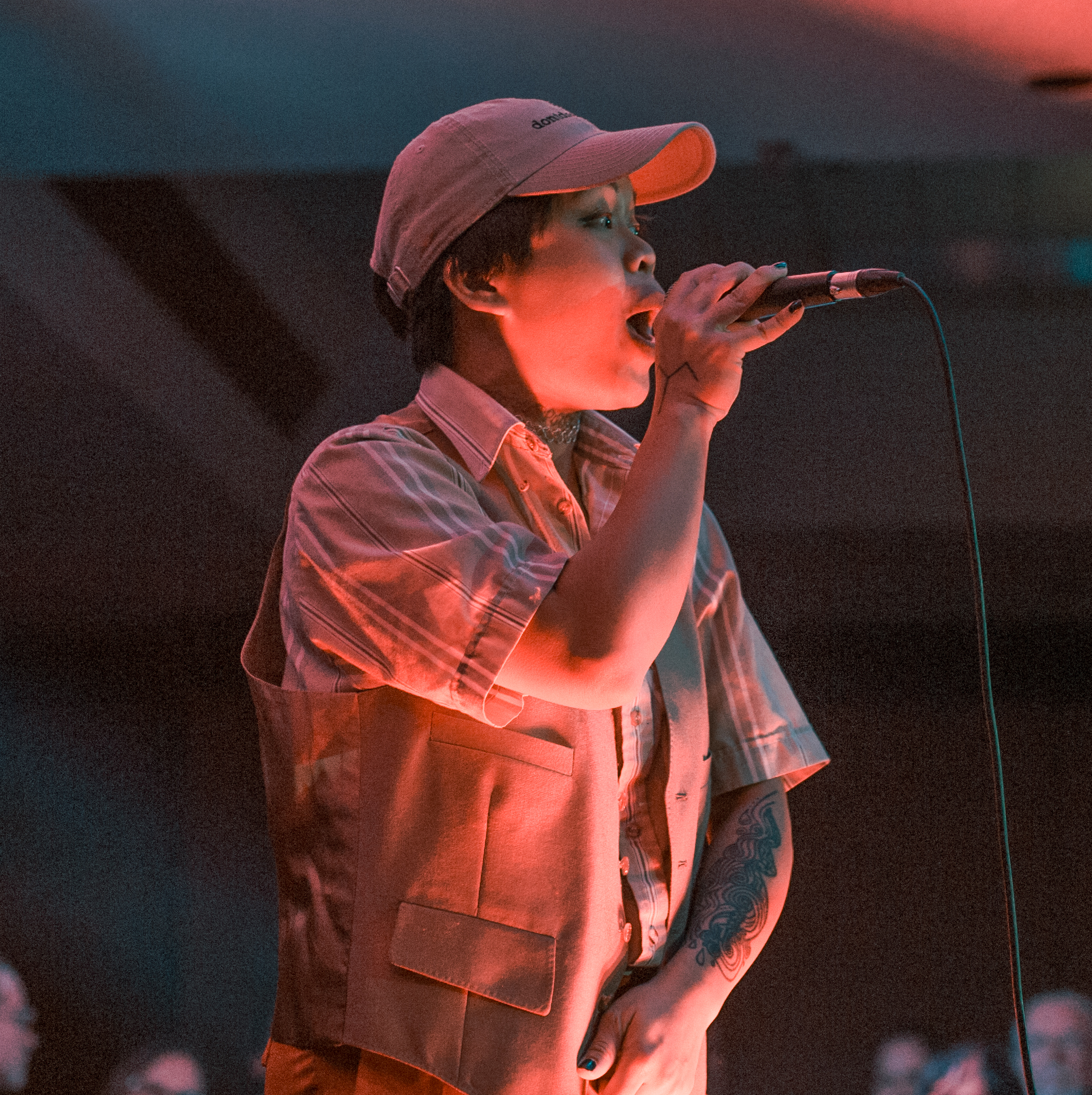
- Kimmortal performing at Coldsnap music festival, 2020

Background information
- Also known as: K!MMORTAL
- Born: Surrey, British Columbia
- Origin: Vancouver
- Genres: rap; hip-hop; R&B; soul; indie rock; experimental
- Occupations: musician; singer-songwriter; visual artist
- Years active: 2014–present
- Website: https://kimmortalportal.com/

Kim Villagante, known professionally, Kimmortal, is a queer Filipino-Canadian musician, singer-songwriter and visual artist based in Vancouver.

== Style ==
=== Music ===
Kimmortal is engaged with music genres such as rap, hip-hop, R&B, soul, indie-rock and experimental. Kimmortal released their first album Sincerity in 2014, and announced the release of their second album X Marks the Swirl in 2019. Their works deal with themes such as race, gender, identity, indigenous rights, personal growth and community building. Through their activities, they attempt to include diverse voices that they believe to be unheard or overlooked. Outside of musical activities, Kimmortal leads musical as well conversational workshops in which they open discuss ideas of gender, race, and First Nations issues associated with youth.

=== Influences ===
Kimmortal claimed to be inspired by artists including Princess Nokia, JB the First Lady, Future Star, Ziibiwan, Lido Pimienta, Megang, Missy D, Huali, Snotty Nose Rez Kids, Ostwelve, Ruby Ibarra, Witch Prophet and Leanne Betasamosake Simpson and her poetry+music project. Kimmortal addresses their parents' influence on their works. Kimmortal touches on their cultural background and represents their family's experience of immigration as part of the working class in Canada. In BeatRoute magazine, Kimmortal states their strength "comes from my mom, she has the most powerful voice and she's 4'11…She's definitely a part of me when I'm on stage." Also, In Cut From Steel, Kimmortal indicated the experience of marginalization of their father who struggled as an artist. Kimmortal describes that they are privileged to pursue their artistic career on the basis of their parents struggles and sacrifices.

=== Collaborations ===
Kimmortal often collaborates with other musicians. In Cut From Steel, Kimmortal addressed the crucial role of the mutual support among artists that shows respect to their efforts. They have collaborated with Missy D, Jb the FirstLady, Immigrant Lessons, Jillthy, Khingz and Ostwelve.

== Notable performances ==
As well as performing shows in musical venues, Kimmortal performs at various festivals and events, including:

=== Venues ===
- Fox Cabaret, Vancouver BC, March 2019
- Rio Theatre, Vancouver BC, March 2019
- Havana Theater, Vancouver BC, February 2019

=== Festivals/events ===
- West 4th Ave Khatsahlano Street Party, Vancouver BC in January 2019
- The Lamentable Tragedy of Produced by Urban Ink Sal Capone, the Roundhouse Community Arts and Recreation Centre, Vancouver BC in April 2018
- PuSh Festival at The Beaumont Studios, Vancouver BC September 2018 and Rifflandia, Victoria BC
- Kultura Filipino Arts Festival, Canadian Music Week
- New West Pride Festival
- The Queer Women of Colour Film Festival, San Francisco, CA

== Selected songs ==
=== Jungle ===
Kimmortal said that the song "Jungle" came from the beatmaking experiment. Kimmortal sampled Kulintang YouTube performance and recorded birds in a cage from their mother's kitchen. They integrated the sounds into a drum component. Editing was done by Kimmortal. They collaborated with Missy D. And Jillthy who composed the lyrics. The music video was shot by Khalil (AKA Khingz) in summer in 2016 in a parking lot.

=== 88 and Beyond ===
Kimmortal wanted to express self-determination and power as well as self-identification. They wanted to challenge the male centred and cisgender hip-hop field and to give queer, persons of colour, and indigenous artists more opportunity to speak for themselves and reach the community.

== Identity ==
Kimmortal uses they/them pronouns, and was born and raised in Canada, a second generation Filipino Canadian. Kimmortal is inspired by the First Nations communities in Western Canada. In Cut From Steel, Kimmortal identities as "Being queer, non-binary and brown as well as non-black and a non-indigenous settler on stolen land are facts to keep in mind when framing my story in a system that consciously disenfranchises certain communities."

== Discography ==
=== Albums ===
- Sincerity (2014)
- X Marks the Swirl (2019)

=== Songs ===
- "I'm Blue"
- "Brushing by Heaven's Shoulder remix"
- "She"
