= Vivian Hicks =

Canadian singer-songwriter and dancer

- Born: October 10, 2003 (age 22); Georgetown, Ontario, Canada
- Genres: Pop
- Occupations: Singer, songwriter, dancer
- Instruments: Vocals, ukulele
- Years active: 2015–present

Vivian Hicks (born October 10, 2003) is a Canadian singer-songwriter and dancer. She was a Mini Pop Kid, a finalist on The Launch, and a golden ticket winner on American Idol.

== Life and career ==
Vivian Hicks was born and raised in Georgetown, Ontario. She started singing and dancing when she was three years old and began uploading YouTube videos when she was four years old. At the age of 10, she performed in the Toronto Zoo’s New Year’s Eve Talent Showcase. She has won awards and scholarships for her singing and dancing and plays ukulele. She attended Holy Cross Catholic Elementary School and Centennial Public School for middle school and was later homeschooled.

Hicks had desired to be a Mini Pop Kid idol since she was seven years old and tried out three times before being chosen at the age of 11. As part of the group, she toured across Ontario and recorded the Mini Pop Kids 13 CD, which was released on November 27, 2015. She also started recording her first single, "#DISS". The song came out when she was 12 years old and garnered 100,000 views on YouTube within its first few weeks. She released her second single, "Start Over", in 2017.

In 2018, Hicks competed on the first season of The Launch, on which she received one-on-one training from Shania Twain. Although she did not win the show, she was signed by Scott Borchetta, CEO of Big Machine Records and executive producer of The Launch. She recorded one original song, "Fan Girl", through Big Machine Records before dropping the label, citing the controversy with Taylor Swift as her reason for leaving.

In 2020, Hicks became the first Canadian to win a golden ticket on American Idol. Entertainment Tonight Canada labeled her "one of the most high-profile talents" to audition that year because she had 1.3 million followers on TikTok and 386,000 followers on Instagram at the time of her audition. Her audition never aired, which Mick Joest of CinemaBlend called a "glaring omission" because she was "seemingly on another level from other competitors showcased thus far."

== Cultural influence ==
Hicks is an anti-bullying advocate and attended an anti-bullying rally at each of the Wichita Falls ISD middle schools in 2017. The rallies were sponsored by the Bullies Reality Foundation.

In October 2019, Hicks began wearing a toque in support of #HatsForHope, an annual campaign hosted by the Brain Tumour Foundation. She became the face of the campaign in 2021 when her grandmother Maarit died of stage 4 brain cancer.
