= I'm Not Pretty =

"I'm Not Pretty" may refer to:

- I'm Not Pretty (Jessia song)
- I'm Not Pretty (Megan Moroney song)
