= Logan Staats =

Canadian singer-songwriter and musician

Logan Staats is a Canadian singer-songwriter and musician. Staats achieved mainstream success throughout 2018, and in 2019, off his win on the first season of CTV's The Launch. He is best known for his single, "The Lucky Ones" which hit number one on the Canadian iTunes chart right after its release. He also appeared in the 2017 Canadian documentary, When They Awake, which celebrates Indigenous artists and their communities.

== Early life ==
Staats is Mohawk, born on Six Nations of the Grand River Territory, and was raised in the nearby town of Brantford, Ontario. He started writing and performing music in his teens, playing the guitar and harmonica. From a young age, Staats was a fan of and inspired by Buffy Sainte-Marie. Staats played numerous live shows in local bars across Turtle Island. He has shared the stage with artists including Buffy Sainte-Marie, Keith Secola, and Mumford & Sons.

== Career ==
=== 2015-2017 ===
Staats appeared in episodes of two television series: Guilt Free Zone (2015), and Urban Native Girl (2016), where he was also credited as a musical performer.

He performed with the band Ghost Town Orchestra, who subsequently won the award for "Best Rock Album" at the 2014 Aboriginal Peoples Choice Music Awards.

Staats released his first full-length album, Goodbye Goldia, on June 21, 2015.

==== When They Awake ====
Staats appeared in the 2017 Canadian documentary When They Awake, co-directed by P. J. Marcellino and Hermon Farahi. The film was created to raise awareness of Indigenous musical talent and highlight Indigenous communities throughout Canada during the year of Canada 150, which was challenged by Indigenous people for Canada's history in colonialism. Staats appeared alongside other Indigenous artists including Wab Kinew, JB the First Lady, Tuk Siglit Drummers & Dancers, and Yellowknife Dene Drummers. Staats appears in the documentary in his hometown of Brantford, Ontario, alongside JB the First Lady.

Staats traveled with members and crew of the film for various screenings throughout Canada, including Toronto, Regina, Peterborough and Owen Sound. He appeared and performed at the Calgary International Film Festival along with IsKwé, DJ Shub, JB the First Lady, and The North Sound.

=== 2018: The Launch ===
In September 2017, Staats was chosen out of 10,000 applicants to compete on the inaugural season of Canadian reality TV music competition The Launch. He appeared on the series premiere in January 2018, one a group of unsigned musical acts competing to have their version of Busbee and Bebe Rexha-written song, "The Lucky Ones", released nationwide through Big Machine Records. Staats worked under the mentorship of music mogul Scott Borchetta, artist Shania Twain, and producer and songwriter Busbee. Staats was selected as the winner of the series, and his rendition of the song was released on January 11, 2018.

=== 2019-present ===
Staat's released his a new single, "Fear Of The Flame", on March 15, 2019. He is currently working on a new album in Nashville.

== Pedagogical work ==
Shortly after winning the first episode of The Launch, Staats began visiting public schools in the Durham Region under the Durham District School Board (DDSB) to meet with Indigenous students. He has spoken of the importance for young, impressionable Indigenous students to see a role model from their ethnic background finding success in the music industry.

On December 4, 2017, Staats visited the Education Centre in Whitby, Ontario, Canada to lead a music workshop with Indigenous youth and allies from six DDSB public high schools, where he shared his story, performed for the students, and answered questions about his life and his music career.

== Discography ==
=== Studio albums ===
- Goodbye Goldia (2015, 6ArrowsMedia)
1. Running Like the River
2. Vampires
3. Simple Man
4. Bright Lights
5. Market Street
6. Ash's
7. Rain
8. What You Love
9. Pretty Little Liars
10. Tax Man
- A Light in the Attic (2023, Red Music Rising)
1. Ohén:ton Karihwaréhkwen (Words Before All Else)
2. Running Like the River
3. Holy Man
4. California
5. Deadman
6. Codeine
7. A Light in the Attic
8. She Just Wants a Folk Song
9. I Wish I Knew Your Name
10. New Tattoo
11. Six Miles

=== Collaborations ===
- "Lightning in a Bottle", in collaboration with Chllly, featured on album titled Pariah (2015, Thru the RedDoor)

=== Singles and EPs ===
- "She Just Wants a Folk Song" (2017, self-released)
- "The Lucky Ones" (2018, Bell Media, Inc. & Big Label Machine Label Group, LLC)
- "Fear Of The Flame" (2019, Big Machine Label Group, LLC & Bell Media, Inc.)

== Awards and nominations ==
Year	Association	Category	Nominee / Work	Result	Ref.
2014	RPM'S Best Indigenous Music of 2014	N/A	Logan Staats	Won	
2014	Aboriginal Peoples Choice Award	Best Rock	Logan Staats	Won	
2016	ROCKWIRED Magazine	Best Male Artist	Logan Staats	Nominated	
2016	Indian Summer Music Awards	Best Folk Album	Logan Staats/Goodbye Goldia	Won	
2016	Native American Music Award	Best New Artist	Logan Staats	Won	
2017	Indigenous Music Awards	Best Producer	Logan Staats	Won	
2017	Indigenous Music Awards	Best Folk Album	Logan Staats/Goodbye Goldia	Won	
2017	Indigenous Music Awards	Best Music Video	Logan Staats/"Ash's"	Nominated	
2018	CTV's The Launch	Chosen Artist	Logan Staats	Won	
2019	Indigenous Music Awards	Best Radio Single	Logan Staats/"The Lucky Ones"	Won	
