= Olivia Lunny =

Canadian singer (born 1999)

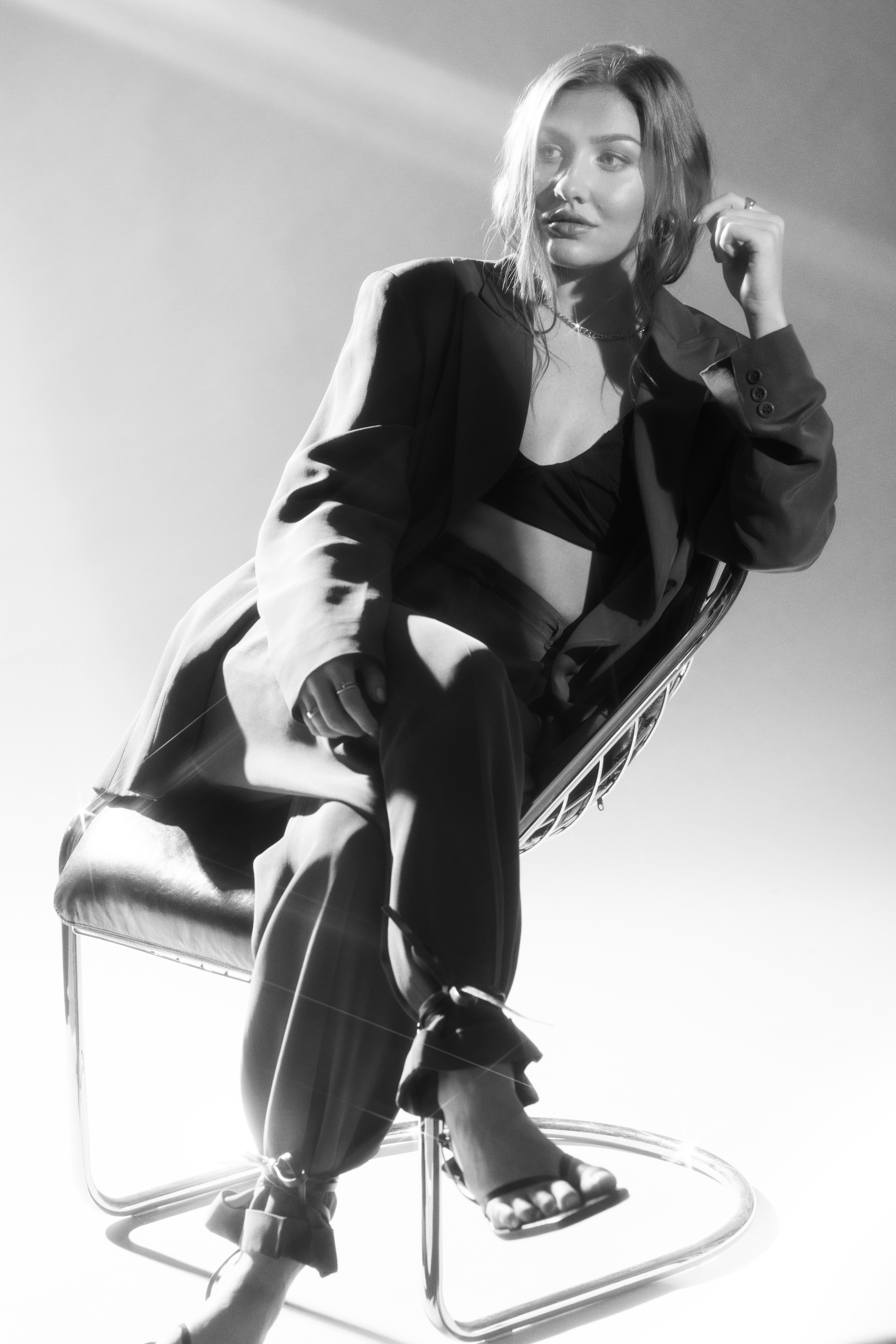
- Lunny in 2020

Background information
- Born: Olivia Lynne Lunny; February 4, 1999 (age 27); Winnipeg, Manitoba, Canada
- Genres: Electropop; synth-pop; indie pop; folktronica
- Occupations: Singer; songwriter
- Instruments: Vocals; piano; guitar; ukulele
- Years active: 2011–present
- Labels: Infinity & Recording; Universal Music Canada
- Website: olivialunny.com

Olivia Lynne Lunny (born February 4, 1999) is a Canadian singer-songwriter and musician. Lunny was crowned a winner on the second season of CTV's singing competition The Launch and scored her first Top 40 hit. She has since released two albums and three EPs.

== Early life ==
Olivia Lynne Lunny was born on February 4, 1999, in Winnipeg, Manitoba. She has a brother named Christian Lunny. She began playing guitar after her father initially gave her lessons at the age of 12. A year later, she began to write her own full songs.

She performed at various local venues and music festivals in her native Winnipeg such as The Good Will Social Club, Garage, Jazz Winnipeg and was part of the Winnipeg Folk Festival's youth lineup before going national with her music.

Lunny has stated Stevie Nicks, Norah Jones, Coldplay and Ed Sheeran as early influences.

== Musical career ==
=== 2018–2020: Career beginnings and The Launch ===
In 2018, Lunny independently released her debut eponymous EP, for which she was nominated for Pop Artist of the Year at the Western Canadian Music Awards. Early the following year, she was chosen as the winner of the second season of music-talent competition The Launch leading to the release of her single "I Got You". Her win also included her opening for Lionel Richie at the Budweiser Stage in Toronto.

In April 2020, Lunny performed on a cover of "Lean on Me" with fellow Canadian artists including Justin Bieber, Michael Bublé, and Avril Lavigne in support of the Canadian Red Cross during the COVID-19 pandemic.

Lunny co-wrote her second EP, To the Ones I Loved, with AJ Healey over a 5-day studio session. The first single, "Think of Me", was released April 17, 2020.

"Bedsheets", the second single from the project, was released May 22, 2020, via a premiere with Parade and in September it was announced that Lunny had been selected as one of the five winners of the SOCAN Foundation Awards for Young Canadian Songwriter for the song. On October 27, 2020, the final video from the EP, "Bedsheets", was premiered with Live Nation's Ones to Watch.

The third single and accompanying video for "Hold Me" were released July 24, 2020.

The full EP which included the final single, "Something New", was premiered by Paper on August 28, 2020.

In October 2020, Lunny signed an imprint deal for her label Infinity and with Universal Music Canada through Virgin Records globally.

=== 2021–2023: Olivia Lunny ===
In March 2021, Lunny was featured in Atwood Magazine's International Women's History Month feature, where she discussed both her goals as a woman in the music industry and also hinted at new music coming later in the year. In the interview she explained her feelings on the importance of creating a collaborative and inclusive space in music for everyone, and the importance of diversity in the field.

On April 9, 2021, Lunny released the first single, "Sad to See You Happy", from her upcoming album where it was featured as The Line of Best Fit's Song of the Day where it received glowing praise. Co-written with AJ Healey, Shaun Frank, and Jenson Vaughn, Lunny said in an Official Charts interview that the song came from the concept of "'love you to death' and being 'sad to see someone happy'. We loved the idea of playing off of an oxymoron." The music video for the track was directed by Louis Browne and featured in Rolling Stone India upon its release.

Later that spring, Lunny was featured as Notion's Internet Crush.

The second single from the album, "Who Could Say No", produced by Boi-1da and Yogi the Producer was released on May 28. In an interview with ReVamp, Lunny explained that listening to disco music with her dad while growing up helped inspire the track.

Lunny's debut full-length album Olivia Lunny was released on July 9. The album featured the third single, "Dominoes" which was co-written with Whitney Philips and Melanie Fontana, and produced by Tommy Brown and Mr. Franks. In an interview with Wonderland, Lunny explained the reason behind a self-titled debut was reflection of herself and the many sides of her artistry. In a feature with TMRW Magazine, Lunny expressed how she hoped the album would become part of the soundtrack to listener's life experiences.

In 2022, Lunny released the singles "Vibe Check" in collaboration with Bhad Bhabie, "Wonderland", and "Under the Lights". She followed this with a five-song EP titled Heartbreak on Repeat in 2023. The EP included the singles "Timezone" and "Fix This," the latter of which saw Lunny working with platinum-selling hitmaker Bryce Vine.

In September 2023, Lunny was selected to headline with Ellie Goulding for the singer's 2023 Higher Than Heaven Tour. On her Instagram she described this as "absolute dream come true. Ellie Goulding has been one of my biggest inspirations since the day I picked up a guitar." Later that same year, she joined Swedish singer and Eurovision winner Loreen for her 2023 The Tattoo Tour.

=== 2024 - present: Velvet Denim ===
Lunny moved to Los Angeles in 2024 to further her music career and subsequently released the single City of Angels later that year to honour her relocation. This followed with her second full-length album Velvet Denim in 2025 where she explored a duality of sound and returned to her acoustic roots. She explained in an interview that the album reflects her personal journey: softness and glamour (“velvet”) as well as grit and rawness (“denim”). She revisited the title of a song she'd written when she was 18, and reimagined it to be the thematic heart of the album.

To promote her singles and second album Lunny toured across various venues including the 2025 Governors Ball Music Festival and supporting Justin Timberlake in his Ireland shows at Belsonic. Lunny announced in July 2025 that she would be headlining American singer Banks’ Off with Her Head tour.

== Discography ==
=== Studio albums ===
- Olivia Lunny (2021)
- Velvet & Denim (2025)

=== EPs ===
- Olivia Lunny (2018)
- To the Ones I Loved (2020)
- Heartbreak on Repeat (2023)

=== Charted singles ===
Title	Year	Peak chart positions					Album
Title	Year	CAN	CAN AC	CAN CHR/Top 40	CAN HAC	US Pop	Album
"I Got You"	2019	—	21	26	27	—	The Launch Season 2 EP
"Lean on Me" (as part of ArtistsCAN)	2020	13	6	15	11	—	Non-album single
"Timezone"	2023	—	—	46	—	—	Heartbreak on Repeat
"Fix This" (with Bryce Vine)	2023	—	—	19	31	39	Heartbreak on Repeat
"—" denotes a recording that did not chart.
