= Ain't Easy =

Single by Elijah Woods x Jamie Fine

from the EP 8:47
- Released: January 17, 2018
- Recorded: Fall 2017
- Genre: Electropop
- Length: 3:08
- Label: Big Machine; Universal
- Songwriter(s): Ryan Tedder; Zack Skelton; Camila Cabello
- Producer(s): Ryan Tedder

Elijah Woods x Jamie Fine singles chronology
"Ain't Easy" (2018)	"Better Off" (2018)

"Ain't Easy" is a song recorded by Canadian electropop duo Elijah Woods x Jamie Fine for the first season of the Canadian reality music competition The Launch. The song was written by Ryan Tedder, Zack Skelton, and Camila Cabello, with a new arrangement composed by Woods and Fine, while Tedder produced the track. Following the duo's selection as the winner of the series's second episode, "Ain't Easy" was released to Canadian radio, digital retailers, and music streaming services on January 17, 2018 by Big Machine Records and Universal Music Canada. The song serves as the lead single for the duo's debut EP, 8:47 (2019).

Since its release, "Ain't Easy" has become the most successful single from The Launch, launching at number one on iTunes and being certified Platinum by Music Canada.

== Recording ==
"Ain't Easy" was recorded in the fall of 2017 as part of the competition on The Launch by both the duo of Elijah Woods and Jamie Fine and the soloist Basil Phoenix. The duo created their own arrangement of the song, which was merged with elements of the original for the final recording. Fine performs lead vocals on the track with Woods accompanying on piano. Scott Borchetta described hearing the duo's version of "Ain't Easy" as being "like an out-of-body experience," contributing to the duo's victory.

== Commercial performance ==
Following the song's release, "Ain't Easy" hit number one on the Canadian iTunes sales chart, displacing co-writer Cabello's "Havana". The song debuted at number 14 on the Canadian Digital Song Sales chart dated January 27, 2018. The following week, "Ain't Easy" debuted at number 40 on the Canadian Hot 100. The song reached its peak position of 38 on the chart dated April 7, 2018. It remains the only single generated by the series to appear on the chart. "Ain't Easy" has reached the top 10 on multiple pop airplay charts, peaking at positions of 1, 6, and 5 on the Canada AC, Canada CHR/Top 40, and Canada Hot AC charts, respectively.

== Charts ==
=== Weekly charts ===
Chart (2018)	Peak position
Canada (Canadian Hot 100)	38
Canada AC (Billboard)	1
Canada CHR/Top 40 (Billboard)	6
Canada Hot AC (Billboard)	5

=== Year-end charts ===
Chart (2018)	Position
Canada (Canadian Hot 100)	84
Canada AC (Billboard)	6
Canada Hot AC (Billboard)	7

== Certifications and sales ==
Region	Certification	Certified units/sales
Canada (Music Canada)	2× Platinum	160,000^{‡}
^{‡} Sales+streaming figures based on certification alone.

== Release history ==
Country	Date	Format	Version	Label	Ref.
North America	January 17, 2018	Digital download; audio streaming	Original	Big Machine; Bell Media	
Canada	January 17, 2018	Radio airplay	Original	Big Machine; Universal Canada	
North America	April 13, 2018	Music download	French version ("Pas Facile")	Big Machine; Bell Media	
United States	October 9, 2018	Contemporary hit radio	Original	Big Machine; Republic	
