= The Launch =

Canadian television series

- Genre: Reality competition
- Created by: Daniel Lachance
- Country of origin: Canada
- Original language: English
- No. of seasons: 2
- No. of episodes: 14

Production
- Executive producers: Scott Borchetta; Paul Franklin
- Running time: 60 minutes
- Production company: Insight Productions

Original release
- Network: CTV
- Release: January 10, 2018 – March 13, 2019

Related
- Canadian Idol

The Launch is a Canadian reality music competition created by Daniel Lachance. The series broadcast by CTV, which premiered on January 10, 2018.

Each episode of the series follows five emerging musicians competing for a chance to have a debut single released commercially. The series was described by its executive producer and lead mentor, Scott Borchetta, as being a contrast to other music competition formats such as American Idol, by being formatted as a self-contained program (rather than a long-term competition with viewer voting), and emphasizing the work of record producers in tailoring new songs to the prospective performers. The series also leverages the platforms of CTV's parent company Bell Media, including its radio stations, in order to promote its winners.

The series was renewed for a second season which aired on CTV between January and March 2019, and Bell sold international format rights to Sony Pictures Television.

== Production ==
In February 2017, Bell Media announced that it had partnered with Scott Borchetta, a record executive best known for developing Taylor Swift, to develop a new, international television format that would "uncover, develop, and promote pop culture's next musical superstars", and "leverage Bell Media's massive reach and extensive platforms to showcase musicians on the national and international stage." Bell Media officially announced the new series, The Launch, in April 2017, with a six-episode order for CTV to air in 2018 as Insight Productions will produce the series alongside Australian production company Eureka Productions and Big Machine Records. The season 1 order was later expanded with a follow-up episode focusing on the six winners.

In an interview with the Toronto Star, Borchetta contrasted The Launch to other reality music competition series such as American Idol (where he mentored during its fourteenth season) and The Voice, by emphasizing its focus on a song itself rather than just performers. He explained that "going 20-plus weeks seeing who gets voted in as the winner, then trying to figure out the song and producer, it just felt like we can do a better job with that much attention and that many sets of ears and eyes paying attention to the show."

Borchetta added that record producers had "a lot of great songs that just haven't had the right opportunity", such as Stephan Moccio, who supplied a song he had worked on whilst working on the soundtrack for Fifty Shades of Grey. Bell Media president and former Universal Music Canada head Randy Lennox (who has previously worked with Borchetta) described the pace of the format, where producers are given 48 hours to work with the two candidate musicians to record their debut single, as being "star-making machinery meets Kiefer Sutherland 24". The winners' songs receive additional production work in between the completion of episode production and their public release.

Over 10,000 applications were received for the first season; Borchetta explained that Canada had a large pool of untapped musical talent because there were no "opportunities" to kickstart their careers (unlike the U.S., whose talent had, in his opinion, been "gone through over and over again" by competing programs), and noted that there was a sense of pride over domestic artists. He emphasized that the series "isn't about somebody that has never performed before getting a record deal; this is about an artist who's ready and just needs this big break. This is the big break." Bell Media's vertical integration is leveraged as an aspect of the series; the winning songs are featured on Bell Media Radio stations and the division's iHeartRadio service, and the series is also covered as part of other CTV programs.

On February 22, 2018, Bell Media sold international rights to the format to American television production & distribution company Sony Pictures Television; the company began to sell the first season of the Canadian version, and develop a British version through its production house Electric Ray. In May 2018, CTV announced that The Launch had been renewed for a second season.

== Format ==
During each episode, five musical acts audition for a panel of mentors (although due to time constraints, not all of the contestants are featured in the episode as broadcast on television). Two of the acts are selected to advance to the second phase of the competition, where they are given 48 hours to record their own versions of an original song, working with producers to adapt the song to suit their individual style. The contestants then perform their versions of the song in front of a live audience. After judging the recording and live performance, the mentors and Borchetta select a winner, whose song is "launched" through digital music services and stores after the airing of the episode.

== Episodes ==
=== Season 1 ===
No.	Title	Original release date	Canada viewers (millions)
1	"The Lucky Ones"	January 10, 2018	1.14
Shania Twain mentors The Revel Boys, Logan Staats, Havelin, Julia Tomlinson, and Vivian Hicks to select a musician to record and release "The Lucky Ones", a song written by Busbee and Bebe Rexha. The competition was won by Logan Staats, a Mohawk resident of the Six Nations of the Grand River.
2	"Ain't Easy"	January 17, 2018	N/A
Jennifer Nettles of Sugarland and Ryan Tedder of OneRepublic mentor Basil Phoenix, JP Maurice, Liteyears, Divine Lightbody, and Elijah Woods x Jamie Fine, to select a musician to record and release "Ain't Easy", a song written by Tedder, Zack Skelton and Camila Cabello. The competition was won by Elijah Woods x Jamie Fine, a duo originating from Ottawa and outside of Perth, Ontario, which had begun to perform together after meeting each other at the Algonquin College.
3	"Wide Awake"	January 24, 2018	N/A
Nikki Sixx of Mötley Crüe and musician and producer Dann Huff mentor Amy Bishop, Dylan Menzie, The Static Shift, Chad Price, and Sons of Daughters, to select a musician to record and release "Wide Awake", a song written by Nathan Barlowe and Bonnie J. Baker. The competition was won by The Static Shift, a Calgary-based rock trio made up of Mitchell Brady (guitar / lead vocals), Keone Friesen (bass / harmonica) and Isaiah Stonehouse (drums / background vocals).
4	"Soldier of Love"	January 31, 2018	N/A
Fergie of The Black Eyed Peas and songwriter, musician and producer Stephan Moccio mentor Ezra Jordan, Faiza, Sariyah Hines, POESY, and Jaryd Stanley, to select a musician to record and release "Soldier of Love", a song written by Stephan Moccio, Lindy Robbins and produced by Stephan Moccio. The competition was won by POESY, a singer from Ancaster, Ontario.
5	"Codes"	February 7, 2018	N/A
Singer Julia Michaels and record producer Ian Kirkpatrick mentor James Marshall, Jayd Ink, Nicky Mackenzie, Noelle Maracle and Zack Lane, to select a musician to record and release "Codes", a song written by Meghan Kabir, Bryan Fryzel, Ferras Alqaisi, Kerr Ann Janeen Thompson and produced by Ian Kirkpatrick. The competition was won by Jayd Ink, a singer from Toronto, Ontario.
6	"Giants"	February 14, 2018	N/A
Singer Boy George and record producer Stephan Moccio mentor Elequen, Ethan Young, Grace Bakker, Raymond Salgado and Victoria Azevedo, to select a musician to record and release "Giants", a song written by Stephan Moccio and Talay Riley and produced by Stephan Moccio. The competition was won by Ethan Young, a singer from Toronto, Ontario.
7	"Just Launched"	February 21, 2018	N/A
A follow-up episode, focusing on the aftermath of the six winners of Season 1.

=== Season 2 ===
No.	Title	Original release date	Canada viewers (millions)
1	"Better"	January 30, 2019	N/A
Ryan Tedder of OneRepublic returns to mentor Amber, Cassiøpeia, Vi, NOA, and Dey, to select a musician to record and release "Better", a song written by Tedder, casey Smith, Zach Skelton, and Ross Ryan. The competition was won by Cassiøpeia, a female singer/songwriter from Burnaby.
2	"Hope"	February 6, 2019	N/A
Singer/Songwriter Sarah McLachlan and song producer Alex Hope mentor Phé, T. Thomason, Trever LaRose, Alexandra Porat, and Avery Florence, to select a musician to record and release "Hope", a song written by Jocelyn Alice, Bobby Campbell, and Jimi Bell. The competition was won by T. Thomason, a singer from Halifax, Nova Scotia. Note: T. Thomason was the only male winner of season 2.
3	"Down to the Roots"	February 13, 2019	N/A
Max Kerman of Arkells and song producer Jon Levine mentor Saveria, James Clayton, Old Soul Rebel, Polina Grace, and Charlie The Kid, to select a musician to record and release "Down to the Roots", a song written by Simon Wilcox, and Scott Stevens. The competition was won by Saveria, a singer/songwriter and lead singer of Daytrip, from London, Ontario.
4	"I Got You"	February 20, 2019	N/A
Singer/Songwriter and Actress Jann Arden and song producer and DJ Shaun Frank mentor Julia Gartha, Nick Babcock, Jayde, Clancy Coulter, and Olivia Lunny, to select a musician to record and release "I Got You", a song written by Jenson Vaughn, Kris Eriksson, Danny Shah, Kayleigh O'Connor, and produced by Shaun Frank. The competition was won by Olivia Lunny, a singer/songwriter from Winnipeg.
5	"Don't Say You Love Me"	February 27, 2019	N/A
Singer, Songwriter, and Canadian legend Bryan Adams has been invited to mentor The Faceplants, Jordane Labrie, Ben Cottrill, Maddie Storvold, and Nate Daviau, to select a musician to record and release "Don't Say You Love Me", a song written by Bryan Adams, Daniel P. Gretchen, and Phil Thornallewy and produced by Adams. The competition was won by Maddie Storvold, a singer from Edmonton.
6	"Emotional"	March 6, 2019	N/A
Singer Bebe Rexha and song producer Nile Rodgers mentor Michelle Treacy, Del Hartley, Sarah Carmosino, Adrian Chalifour, and WILL, to select a musician to record and release "Emotional", a song written by Ben West, Hillary Lindsey, Lisa Scinta, and Josh Miller. The competition was won by Michelle Treacy, a singer from Ottawa, Ontario.
7	"Just Launched"	March 13, 2019	N/A
A follow-up episode, focusing on the aftermath of the six winners of Season 2.

== Reception ==
Montreal Gazette media writer Steve Faguy gave the series premiere a positive review. He noted that The Launch's contrasting format to viewer-voted music competitions, as well as its focus on the production process of music, would make it appeal to viewers interested in a show focusing on artists and music. He felt that the contributions of Borchetta and other expert mentors gave the program authenticity, but that Borchetta was "stiff" as an on-camera personality. However, Faguy was critical of the premiere's featured song, "The Lucky Ones", describing it as being "catchy" but written "by committee", with "uninspiring" lyrics and "a melody that doesn't really set it apart from anything else you'll hear on Virgin Radio." He also criticized the decision to cut auditions from the airing episode for time constraints (although Bell defended the decision by noting that these contestants were still able to participate in promotion for the series, would be featured in supplemental digital content posted on the CTV website and YouTube, and that "director's cut" versions of each episode would be made available for streaming on CraveTV after their CTV broadcast). In conclusion, Faguy felt that The Launch "has some potential as a format that could be exportable elsewhere, despite its flaws."

"The Lucky Ones", the featured song in its series premiere, reached #1 on the iTunes Store sales chart in Canada following the episode's broadcast. "Ain't Easy" was the most successful song of the first season, reaching a Music Canada Platinum certification and being the only one to chart on the Billboard Canadian Hot 100.

== Discography ==
=== EPs ===
- 2018: The Launch EP
- 2019: The Launch Season 2 EP

=== Singles ===
Year	Title	Performer	Peak chart positions						Certifications	EP
Year	Title	Performer	CAN	CAN AC	CAN CHR	CAN HAC	CAN Rock	CAN CCW	Certifications	EP
2018	"The Lucky Ones"	Logan Staats	—	18	40	34	—	—		The Launch EP
2018	"Ain't Easy"	Elijah Woods x Jamie Fine	38	1	6	5	—	—	MC: Platinum	The Launch EP
2018	"Wide Awake"	The Static Shift	—	—	—	—	22	—		The Launch EP
2018	"Soldier of Love"	POESY	—	27	40	33	—	—		The Launch EP
2018	"Codes"	Jayd Ink	—	28	41	—	—	—		The Launch EP
2018	"Giants"	Ethan Young	—	26	—	—	—	—		The Launch EP
2019	"Better"	Cassiøpeia	—	—	34	46	—	—		The Launch Season 2 EP
2019	"Hope"	T. Thomason	—	—	35	41	—	—		The Launch Season 2 EP
2019	"Down to the Roots"	Saveria	—	22	36	36	—	—		The Launch Season 2 EP
2019	"I Got You"	Olivia Lunny	—	21	26	26	—	—		The Launch Season 2 EP
2019	"Don't Say You Love Me"	Maddie Storvold	—	—	—	—	—	39		The Launch Season 2 EP
2019	"Emotional"	Michelle Treacy	—	27	27	—	—	—		The Launch Season 2 EP
"—" denotes a single that failed to chart or was not released to that format.
