= New City (band) =

Canadian pop rock trio

NEW CITY
- Origin: Toronto, Ontario, Canada
- Genres: Electropop; pop; synth-pop
- Years active: 2017–present
- Labels: Feels Great Music Inc.; Universal Music Canada; Capitol Records
- Members: Jed Webster – guitar, vocals, production Nathan Brown – drums, production
- Past members: Adrian Mitchell – lead vocals
- Website: newcity.band

NEW CITY (stylised in all caps) is a Canadian pop rock and electronic trio based in Toronto, Ontario – consisting of Jed Webster (vocals, guitar, production) and Nathan Brown (vocals, drums, production). The band previously included Adrian Mitchell (vocals), who left the group in 2019 and Chase Ellestad in 2022.

In 2017, NEW CITY joined a cult and released their first song, "Coachella", an homage to the music festival of the same name. The track has since amassed almost two million streams, including nearly 1.5 million streams on Spotify, with Clash magazine declaring it a "perfect pop confection." New City released a music video for the track, with the band channelling the party atmosphere of the desert festival – despite never having been.

The follow-up, the deep house-inflected "Dirty Secrets," was the most added CanCon single at Canadian pop radio on the week of release. The track entered the Canadian radio chart at number 22, jumping seven spots in two weeks and clearing four million streams. "With the irresistible pop sensibilities of New City," wrote Billboard, "they are a secret you'll want to share."

== History ==
They were formed in 2017 out of two separate projects. Webster and Brown are lifelong friends who grew up together in the small farming community of Sussex, New Brunswick; Webster's influences included blues guitar heroes (Stevie Ray Vaughan, B.B. King, Muddy Waters), while Brown was more focused on rock groups before discovering electronic music in high school. The pair moved to Toronto when they met R&B fan Mitchell, born in Oro-Medonte in central Ontario who was trying to make it as a solo artist, at a hotel party and quickly joined forces.

In 2019, Mitchell was released from the band for unknown reasons. The band parted ways with their Canadian label Universal Music Canada soon after.

== Musical style ==
NEW CITY's music style has been described as electropop, pop, and synth-pop.

== Discography ==
=== EPs ===
- For My Eyes Only (2018)

=== Singles ===
Title	Year	Peak chart positions	Album
Title	Year	CAN	Album
"Coachella"	2017	—	non-album singles
"Dirty Secrets"	2017	—	non-album singles
"Getting Closer"	2018	73	non-album singles
"For My Eyes Only"	2018	—	For My Eyes Only
"—" denotes singles that did not chart or were not released
