= JB the First Lady =

- Born: Jerilynn Snuxyaltwa Webster; March 12, 1984 (age 42); Moose Jaw, Saskatchewan
- Genres: Hip-hop, spoken word
- Occupations: Rapper, poet, activist
- Years active: 2000s-present
- Website: https://www.jbthefirstlady.ca/

Jerilynn Snuxyaltwa Webster, known by her stage name JB the First Lady (born 1984) is an Indigenous hip-hop and spoken word artist, emcee, beat-boxer, activist, cultural dancer, and youth educator from the Nuxalk and Onondaga nations. She is currently based in Vancouver, British Columbia, Canada. JB sees her music as a way of capturing oral history and often writes lyrics about challenging subjects such as the Canadian Indian residential school system and missing and murdered Indigenous women. She sees hip-hop as a tool of Indigenous empowerment and is a prominent voice for decolonization and for inspiring Indigenous women and youth.

== Early life ==
Webster was born in Moose Jaw, Saskatchewan on March 12, 1984. She spent her childhood moving around Canada, and by the time she was a teenager she had lived in many different cities and communities across the country. Webster moved to Vancouver in the early 2000s where she attended her first hip-hop show by Tribal Wisdom, a group of young Indigenous rappers. The show was a pivotal moment for Webster in her journey as a hip-hop artist that inspired her to create music that would empower other young people. In an interview with CBC Music in 2014, she said: "When I went to this hip-hop show, I saw Kinnie Starr and Skeena Reece, Ostwelve, Manik1derful, and they just had so much pride about who they were and where they came from. I wanted to encourage other young people to stand up for the injustices in Canada pertaining to land, water, Aboriginal rights."

Webster then began spending time at the Knowledgeable Aboriginal Youth Association (KAYA) in Vancouver where she had free access to a recording studio and began putting out mixtapes. She began working at KAYA and became executive director of the organization at age 22.

== Career ==
In 2006, Webster helped found the First Ladies Crew, an Indigenous women's rap and hip-hop collective based out of East Vancouver that features Rapsure Risin, Dani and Lizzy, Christie Lee Charles, and Mama Es. The First Ladies Crew uses hip-hop as a platform to empower young Indigenous women and bring light to oral histories and questions of identity. "Our ancestors, the matriarchs, were the speakers, the keepers of ceremony, and our oral history," said Webster. "As a young person, an activist talking about women’s rights or about murdered and missing Indigenous women, hip-hop has been the best venue to connect with not only my peers and young people, but also the greater public that may have barriers to listening to the stories of First Nations and Indigenous people."

With four solo and one collaborative album out, Webster is a strong, consistent voice in Indigenous hip-hop and activism. She is well known for her involvement in the Idle No More movement and for emceeing rallies for Indigenous rights, decolonization, environmental justice, and the issue of violence against Indigenous women. In February 2017, Webster was a panelist for a national forum on Missing and Murdered Indigenous Women in Girls hosted by Anna Maria Tremonti for CBC's The Current. Webster has performed, spoken, and facilitated music events at hundreds of venues across Canada, including youth and community centers in Indigenous communities, at political rallies, and in schools. Since the release of the Truth and Reconciliation Commission's final report, Webster has also regularly spoken about Indigenous knowledge and histories with immigrant, refugee, and non-Indigenous communities and groups such as the B.C. Nurses' Union and the Hospital Employees’ Union. Despite national recognition, Webster maintains a strong focus on supporting and giving back to the youth in her community.

== Awards and nominations ==
- #35, 100 Best Canadian Songs of 2017, CBC Music (2017)
- Commemorative Medal, Queens Golden Jubilee
- Emerging Community Engaged Artist, Mayor Arts Award, Vancouver (2016)
- Best Cover Album, Indigenous Music Award (2015)
- Nomination, Best New Album, Aboriginal Peoples Choice Award (2012)
- Nomination, Female Entertainer of the Year, Aboriginal Peoples Choice Award (2011)
- Nomination, Best New Hip-Hop Album, Aboriginal Peoples Choice Award (2011)

== Discography ==
=== Solo albums ===
- Indigenous Love (2008, self-released)
- Get Ready Get Steady (2011, self-released)
- Indigenous Girl Lifestyle (2014, self-released)
- Meant To Be (2017, self-released)
- Righteous Empowered Daughter (2018, Self-released)

=== Collaborations ===
- Indigenized by Enter-Tribal, in collaboration with Chief Rock (2015)

=== Singles ===
- "Get Ready Get Steady" (2011)
- "OOTG" (2017)
- "Still Here" (2018)
