= I'm Not Pretty (Jessia song) =

Single by Jessia

from the EP How Are You?
- Written: December 2020
- Released: January 8, 2021
- Genre: Pop
- Label: Republic
- Producer: Elijah Woods

Jessia singles chronology
"Conviction" (2020)	"I'm Not Pretty" (2021)	"I Should Quit" (2021)

Music video
- "I'm Not Pretty" on YouTube

"I'm Not Pretty" is a song by Canadian singer-songwriter Jessia, written by her and produced by Elijah Woods. It was released by Republic Records on January 8, 2021, as the lead single from her debut extended play How Are You? (2021).

== Background ==
Jessia wrote the song over Christmas 2020 from her childhood bedroom in Ucluelet on Vancouver Island. Later she would post the song as a video to TikTok, which blew up in 2021. Released on January 8, 2021, through Republic Records the song would gain significant traction and rack over 255 million streams.

== Charts ==
Chart performance for I'm Not Pretty
Chart (2021)	Peak position
Austria (Ö3 Austria Top 40)	64
UK Singles Downloads (Official Charts)	69
UK Singles Sales Chart (OCC)	17
UK Independent Singles Breakers (OCC)	17

== Certifications and sales ==
Certifications for "I'm Not Pretty"
Region	Certification	Certified units/sales
Canada (Music Canada)	Platinum	80,000^{‡}
United States (RIAA)	Gold	500,000^{‡}
^{‡} Sales+streaming figures based on certification alone.
