= Jessia =

- Born: Jessika Harling; February 28, 1994 (age 32); Ucluelet, British Columbia, Canada
- Musical career
- Origin: Vancouver, British Columbia, Canada
- Occupations: Singer; songwriter
- Years active: 2021–present
- Label: Republic
- Website: jessiamusic.com

Jessika Harling (born February 28, 1994), known professionally as Jessia, is a Canadian singer-songwriter. She has been nominated for multiple Juno Awards. Including Breakthrough Artist of The Year, Single of The Year for her song "I'm Not Pretty," Pop Album of the Year for her debut extended play How Are You? and the Fan Choice Award.

Born and raised in Ucluelet, Vancouver Island, Jessia would write songs at 10 and later officially begin her musical career in 2021 after graduating the music program at MacEwan University. She would release the single "I'm Not Pretty", which blew up on platforms such as TikTok, peaked at the top 25 of the Canadian Hot 100 Chart and was certified double platinum by Music Canada.

== Early life and education ==
Jessika Harling was born on February 28, 1994 in Ucluelet, Vancouver Island, to her musician teacher mother Beth Harling. She would start writing music around age 10. Harling was a graduate of the music program at MacEwan University.

== Career ==
Harling would release "I'm Not Pretty" as a TikTok video in early 2021. Which would gain traction, and get her signed to Republic Records. She released her debut EP, How Are You?, in October 2021. "I'm Not Pretty" would later get a remix with Bebe Rexha. She won the Juno Award for Breakthrough Artist of the Year at the Juno Awards of 2022, and was nominated for Single of the Year for "I'm Not Pretty", Pop Album of the Year for How Are You? and the Fan Choice Award.

"I'm Not Pretty" was certified double platinum by Music Canada, and gold by Recording Industry Association of America (RIAA) in April 2022, and currently sits at over 100 million streams on Spotify. In 2023, she participated in an all-star recording of Serena Ryder's single "What I Wouldn't Do", which was released as a charity single to benefit Kids Help Phone's Feel Out Loud campaign for youth mental health. Harling would later release "I'm Not Gonna Cry" on December 13, 2024.

== Awards and nominations ==
List of awards and nominations, with award, year, category, nominated work, result, and reference shown
Award	Year	Category	Nominee(s)	Result	Ref.
Juno Awards	2022	Breakthrough Artist of the Year	Jessia	Won	
Juno Awards	2022	Single of the Year	"I'm Not Pretty"	Nominated	
Juno Awards	2022	Fan Choice Award	Jessia	Nominated	
Juno Awards	2022	Pop Album of the Year	"How Are You?"	Nominated	
